= List of named passenger trains of New Zealand =

This article contains a list of named passenger trains in New Zealand.

Train Name	Operator	Train Endpoints	First Run	Last Run
Bay Express	New Zealand Railways Corporation, Tranz Scenic	Wellington - Napier	1989	2001
Blue Streak	New Zealand Railways Department	1968: Auckland - Hamilton, 1968-72: Auckland - Wellington, 1972-77: Wellington - New Plymouth	1968	1977
Capital Connection	New Zealand Railways Corporation, Tranz Metro, Tranz Scenic, KiwiRail	Palmerston North - Wellington	1991	present
Coastal Pacific (formerly TranzCoastal)	New Zealand Railways Corporation, Tranz Scenic, KiwiRail Scenic Journeys, The Great Journeys of New Zealand, Great Journeys New Zealand	Christchurch - Picton	1988	present
Culverden Express	New Zealand Railways Department	Christchurch - Culverden (later Parnassus)	1886	1945?
Daylight Limited	New Zealand Railways Department	Wellington - Auckland	1925	1963
Endeavour	New Zealand Railways Department	Wellington - Napier (and for some years, Gisborne)	1972	1989
Geyserland Express	New Zealand Rail, Tranz Scenic	Auckland - Rotorua	1991	2001
Kaimai Express	New Zealand Rail, Tranz Scenic	Auckland - Tauranga	1991	2001
Kingston Flyer	New Zealand Railways Department	Gore and Invercargill - Kingston	1890s	1957
Lynx Express	Tranz Scenic	Picton - Christchurch	1994	1995
Napier Express	New Zealand Railways Department	Wellington - Napier	1891	1954
New Plymouth Express	New Zealand Railways Department, Wellington and Manawatu Railway Company	Wellington - New Plymouth	1886	1955
New Plymouth Night Express	New Zealand Railways Department	Auckland - New Plymouth	1933	1983
Night Limited	New Zealand Railways Department	Wellington - Auckland	1924	1971
Northern Explorer	KiwiRail Scenic Journeys, The Great Journeys of New Zealand, Great Journeys New Zealand	Wellington - Auckland	2012	present
Northerner	New Zealand Railways Department, Tranz Scenic	Wellington - Auckland	1975	2004
Northland Express	New Zealand Railways Department	Auckland - Opua	1925	1956
Overlander	New Zealand Rail, Tranz Scenic	Wellington - Auckland	1991	2012
Picton Express	New Zealand Railways Department	Christchurch - Picton	1945	1956
Rotorua Express	New Zealand Railways Department	Auckland - Rotorua	1894	1959
Scenic Daylight	New Zealand Railways Department	Wellington - Auckland	1963	1968
Seasider	Dunedin Railways	Dunedin - Palmerston	2002	present
Silver Fern	New Zealand Railways Department	Wellington - Auckland	1972	1991
Silver Star	New Zealand Railways Department	Wellington - Auckland	1971	1979
Southerner	New Zealand Railways Department, Tranz Scenic	Christchurch - Invercargill	1970	2002
South Island Limited	New Zealand Railways Department	Christchurch - Invercargill	1949	1970
Taieri Gorge Limited	Dunedin Railways	Dunedin - Middlemarch or Pukerangi	1987	present
Taneatua Express	New Zealand Railways Department	Auckland - Taneatua	1929	1959
Te Huia	KiwiRail	Auckland - Hamilton	2021	present
Thames Express	New Zealand Railways Department	Auckland - Thames	1908	1928
TranzAlpine	New Zealand Railways Corporation, Tranz Scenic, KiwiRail Scenic Journeys, The Great Journeys of New Zealand, Great Journeys New Zealand	Christchurch - Greymouth	1987	present
Waikato Connection	Tranz Scenic	Hamilton - Auckland	2000	2001
Wairarapa Connection	New Zealand Railways Department, Tranz Metro, Metlink	Masterton - Wellington	1964	present
Wairarapa Mail	New Zealand Railways Department	Wellington - Woodville	1909	1948
