= Hamilton railway station, New Zealand =

Railway station in New Zealand

Hamilton railway station
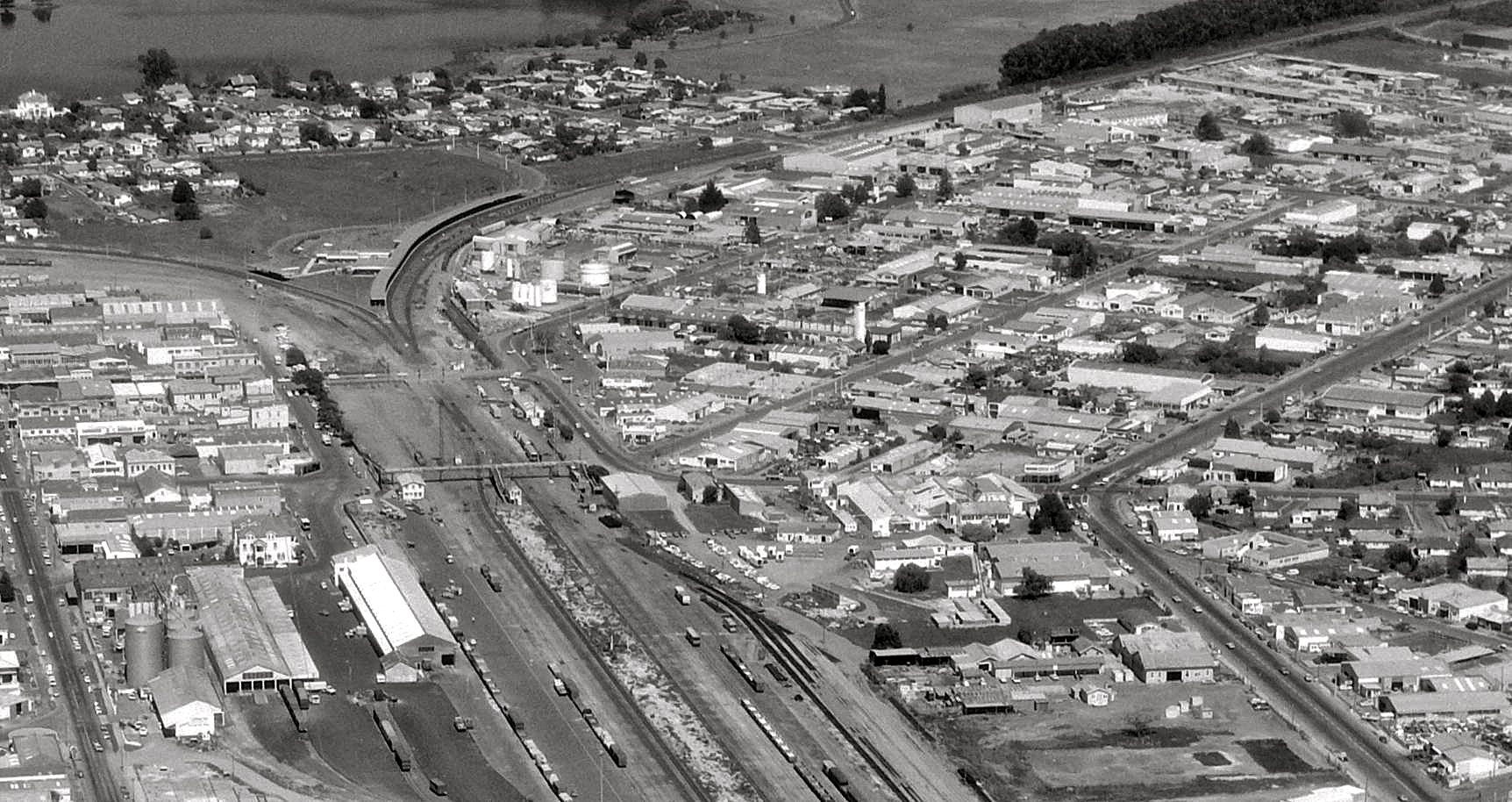
- 1980 – the 1975 Hamilton station in the middle distance, the 1909 Frankton Junction being demolished in the foreground. ECMT and NIMT branching to left and right respectively. The pre-1909 station was between the later stations.

General information
- Location: Fraser Street, Hamilton; New Zealand
- Coordinates: 37°47′30″S 175°15′55″E
- Owner: KiwiRail
- Line: North Island Main Trunk
- Platforms: 2
- Connections: East Coast Main Trunk (goods only)

Construction
- Parking: Yes

History
- Opened: 19 December 1877
- Rebuilt: 6 August 1975
- Electrified: 25 kV 50 Hz AC June 1988
- Former names: Hamilton, Hamilton Junction (20 October 1879 – 1 October 1884), Frankton Junction (1884–1955), Frankton (1955-20 July 1975)

Services
Preceding station	KiwiRail	Following station
Rotokauri towards Auckland Strand	Te Huia	Terminus
Preceding station	Great Journeys New Zealand	Following station
Papakura towards Auckland Strand	Northern Explorer	Otorohanga towards Wellington
Preceding station	KiwiRail	Following station
	Historical railways	
Te Rapa Racecourse; Line open, station closed 3 km (1.9 mi) towards Britomart	North Island Main Trunk; KiwiRail	Rukuhia; Line open, station closed 8.45 km (5.25 mi) towards Wellington
Terminus	East Coast Main Trunk	Hamilton Central; Line open, station closed 1.7 km (1.1 mi)
Location

Hamilton railway station serves the city of Hamilton in the Waikato region of New Zealand. It is located in the suburb of Frankton, hence the station's former name Frankton Junction, its name for most of its existence. The station is a Keilbahnhof, located at the junction of the North Island Main Trunk (NIMT) and East Coast Main Trunk (ECMT) lines. The station is served by the regional Te Huia service, which runs to Auckland via Rotokauri Transport Hub and Huntly railway station twice daily in the morning, with return services in the evening and by the 6-days a week, Northern Explorer passenger service, between Auckland and Wellington.

== History ==
An engine shed was built at Hamilton Junction in 1882 and by 1884 there was a 4th class station, platform, cart approach, 60 ft (18 m) x 30 ft (9.1 m) goods shed, loading bank, stationmaster's house, urinals and a passing loop for 38 wagons. A lean-to station building with veranda was added in 1900 and gas lighting in 1910. By 1911 the goods shed had grown to 138 ft (42 m) x 30 ft (9.1 m) and there was a crane and fixed signals.

Frankton Junction station consisted of an island platform located on the NIMT just north of the junction between the ECMT and NIMT. It had two signal boxes, and a locomotive depot was located in the Vee of the junction. In 1909 a new, larger station was built to cope with the extra traffic of the through line to Wellington, 16 chains (1,100 ft; 320 m) to the north. The first Auckland - Wellington through expresses ran on 14 February 1909, taking 19 hours 13 minutes, and stopping at Frankton.

Due to the end of steam operation in the North Island in 1968, the depot was closed and a new station, 400 yd (370 m) south of the existing Frankton Junction was tendered for in October 1972. On 6 December 1972 a contract was awarded to Ray Leach Ltd. and by May 1975 the station was nearly complete. It was opened on 6 August 1975, with a side platform on each line. The station was renamed Hamilton at that time and the station formerly with that name, in the town centre, and its associated Road Services terminal in Ward Street, were renamed Hamilton Travel Centre. The listed Frankton South End signal box was relocated to the Hamilton Miniature Engineers' site at Minogue Park, opposite the new Te Rapa loco depot.

The station was important in the growth of Hamilton and historically the trains calling included The Overlander, Blue Streak, Scenic Daylight, Daylight Limited, Northerner, Silver Star, Night Limited, Waikato Connection, Rotorua Express, Geyserland Express, Thames Express, Taneatua Express and Kaimai Express.

The scale of past use of the station is indicated by a 1936 report that 3 months' revenue was £7065 for tickets (27,025 sold), £1482 for parcels and £24,143 for goods, including 43,357 sheep, 5,849 cattle and 1,756,450 bd ft (4,144.8 m^{3}) of timber. The 2016 equivalent would be about $15m a year.

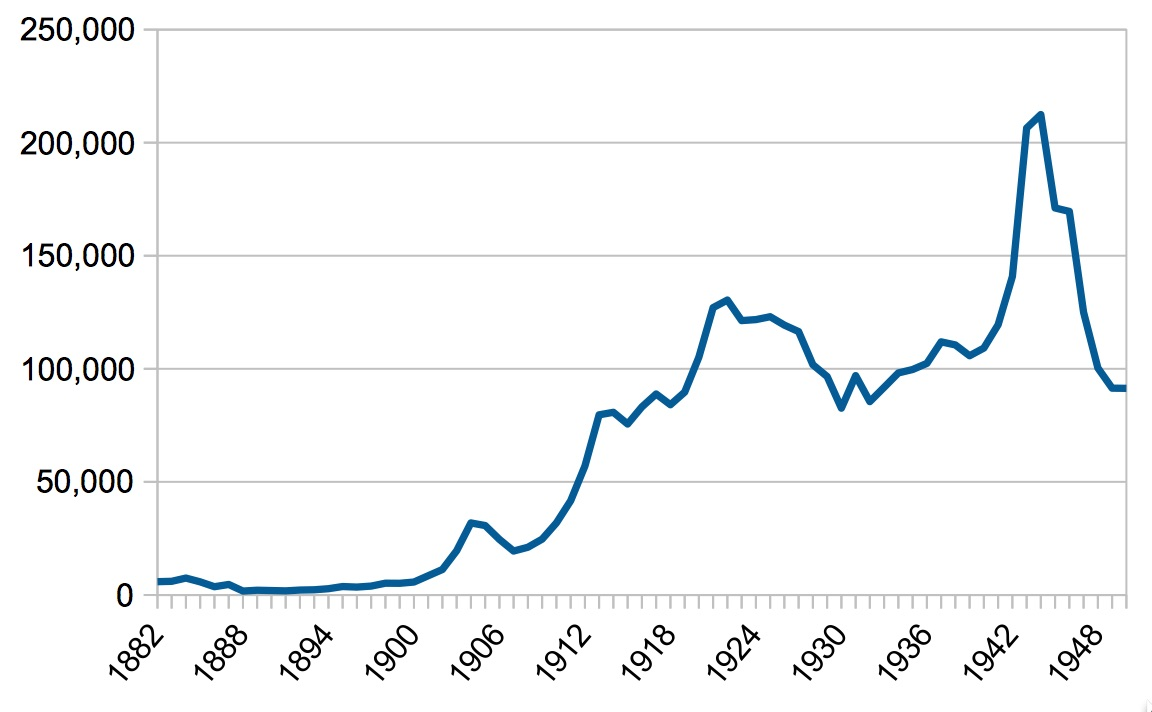
tickets sales 1882–1950 – derived from annual returns to Parliament of "Statement of Revenue for each Station for the Year ended"

Traffic grew steadily, as shown in the graph and table below.

year	tickets	season tickets	staff	ref.
1881			1	
1882	5,883		1	
1883	6,039		1	
1884	7,475		1	
1885	5,809		1	
1886	3,634		2	
1887	4,648	2	3	
1888	1,719		1	
1889	2,077		2	
1890				
1891	1,810		2	
1892	2,178		3	
1893	2,271		3	
1894	2,758		3	
1895	3,735		3	
1896	3,505		4	
1897	3,934		6	
1898	5,188		7	
1899	5,147		7	
1900	5,715		8	
1901				
1902	11,264	3	9	
1903	19,530	3	13	
1904	31,845	55	12	
1905	30,678	56	12	
1906	24,555	58	16	
1907	19,420	83	18	
1908	21,098	124	20	
1909	24,684	48	26	
1910	31,830	63	33	
1911	41,659	116	43	
1912	57,009	204	48	
1913	79,655	235	57	
1914	80,769	313		
1915	75,594	335		
1916	83,163	266		
1917	88,855	194		
1918	84,129	89		
1919	89,672	87		
1920	105,146	127		
1921	127,034	98		
1922	130,403	90		
1923	121,334	86		
1924	121,751	73		
1925	123,021	55		
1926	119,312	92		
1927	116,451	331		
1928	101,809	254		
1929	96,565	181		
1930	82,596	342		
1931	96,979	142		
1932	85,485	129		
1933	91,795	66		
1934	98,184	74		
1935	99,678	113		
1936	102,403	57		
1937	111,915	133		
1938	110,555	575		
1939	105,799	102		
1940	109,174	92		
1941	119,493	87		
1942	140,779	93		
1943	206,437	42		
1944	212,403	54		
1945	171,103	18		
1946	169,589	74		
1947	124,930	128		
1948	100,369	181		
1949	91,446	47		
1950	91,360	33		

== Name ==
As noted above, the station has had several names. For Te Huia it is called Frankton, to distinguish it from Rotokauri, the other station in Hamilton used by that train to Auckland. Kiwirail uses Hamilton Kirikiriroa Frankton Station, to describe their Northern Explorer train stop.

== Services ==
In 2009, the canopy over platform 1 (NIMT) was reduced in length. The ECMT carries no passenger services and its platform (platform 2) is used infrequently by excursion trains.

The station is currently served by the Te Huia service to Auckland Strand station using refurbished SA and SD coaches.

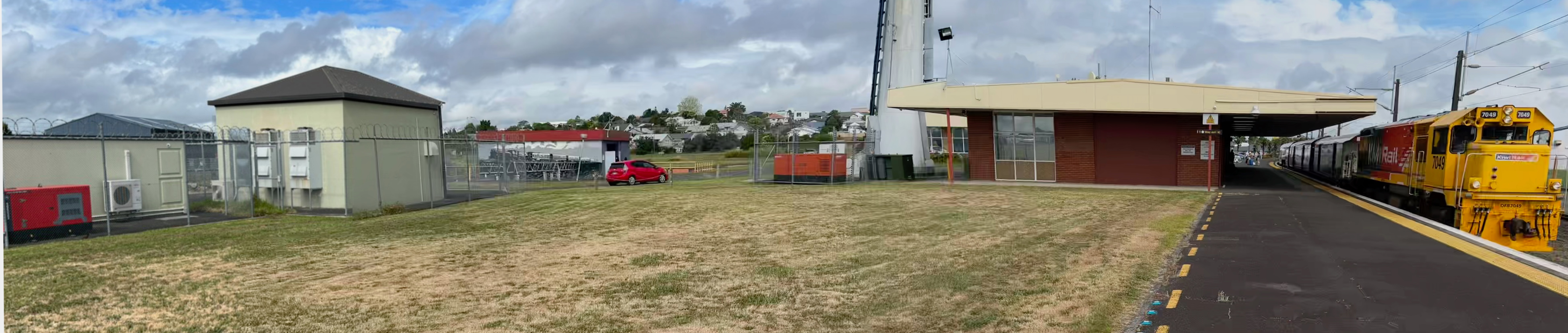
Northern Explorer at Hamilton in 2024 heading north

Previous services include the Kaimai Express and Geyserland Express railcars to Tauranga and Rotorua (Koutu) respectively, which were cancelled in 2002, and the overnight Northerner, which ceased operation in November 2004 under Toll Rail. The Overlander stopped at the station until on 24 June 2012, until the Northern Explorer succeeded it.

The Waikato Connection commuter service to Auckland ran in June 2000 and October 2001.

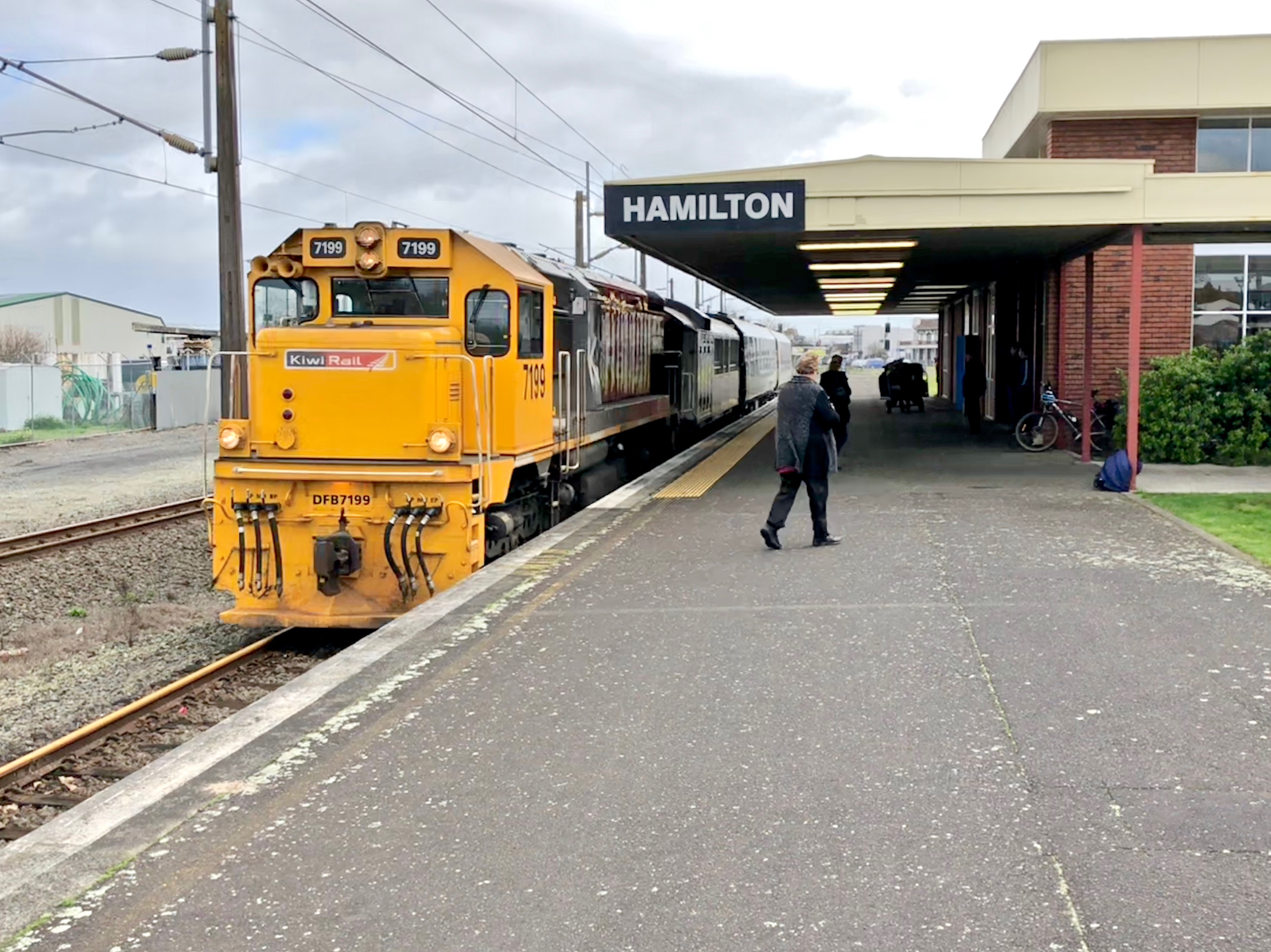
Northern Explorer at Hamilton in 2018 heading south

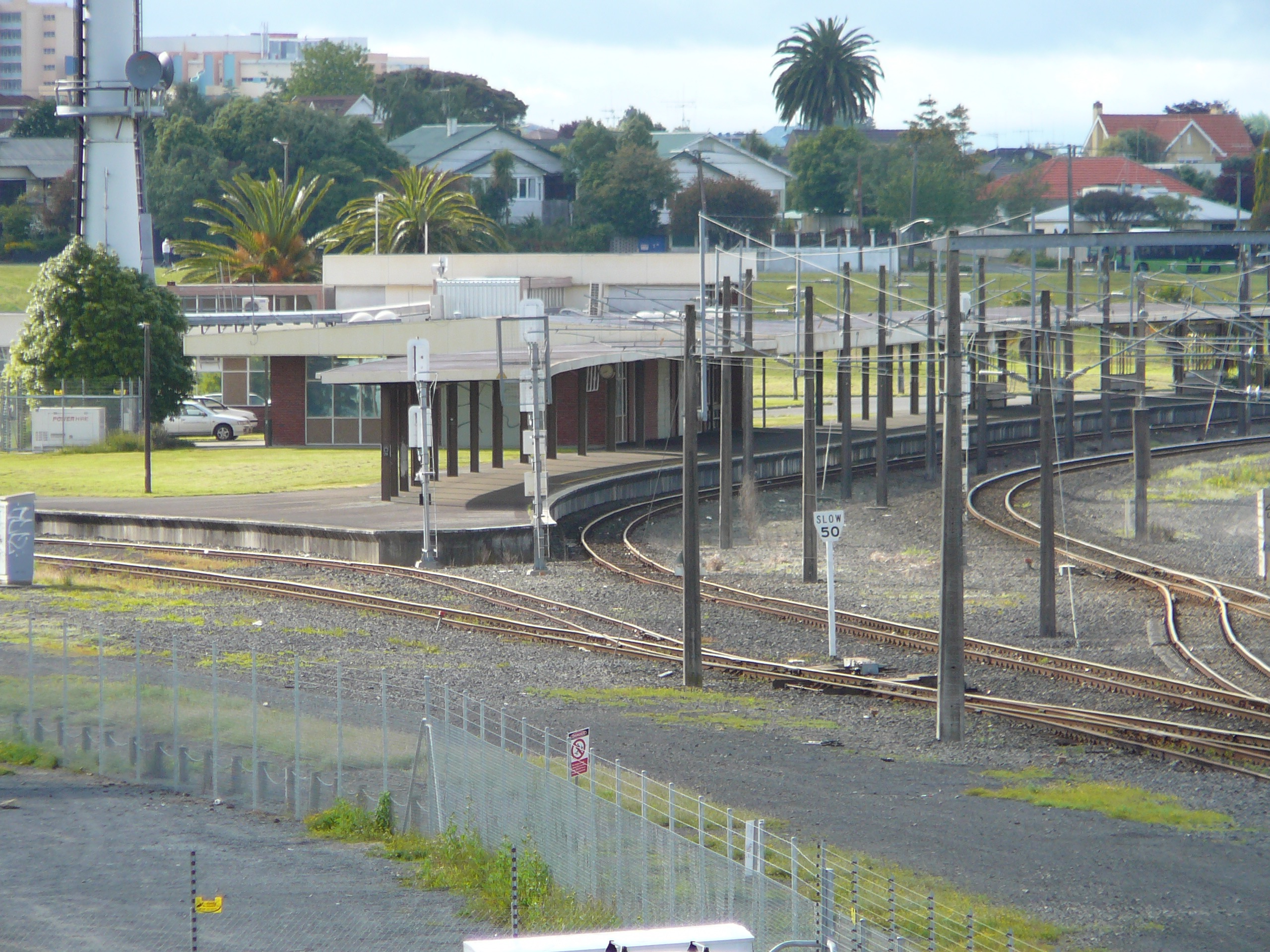
Hamilton station from Massey Hall bridge, showing the NIMT platform (right) and ECMT (left). In 2006, the station still had the long canopy over the platforms

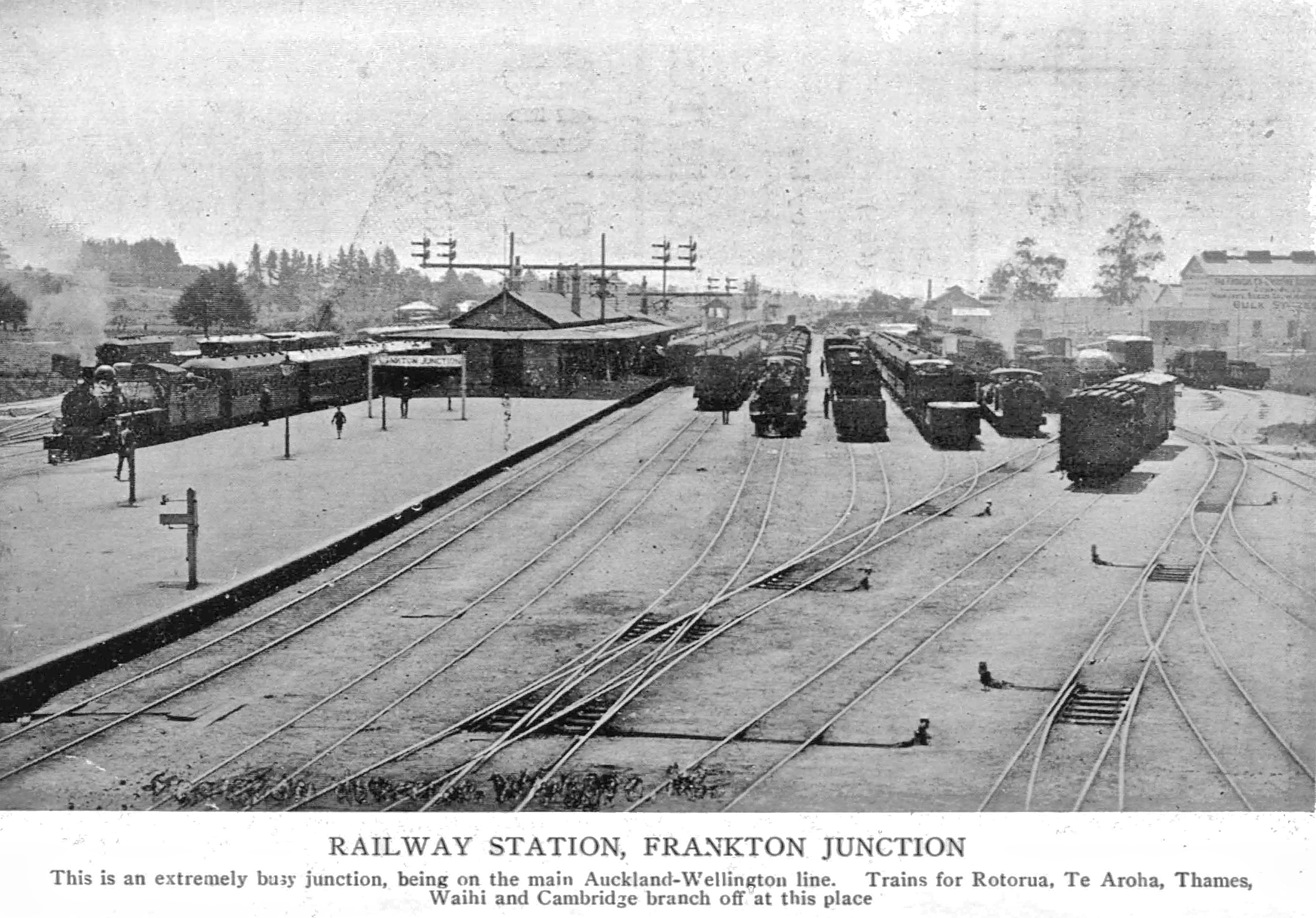
Frankton Junction about 1915

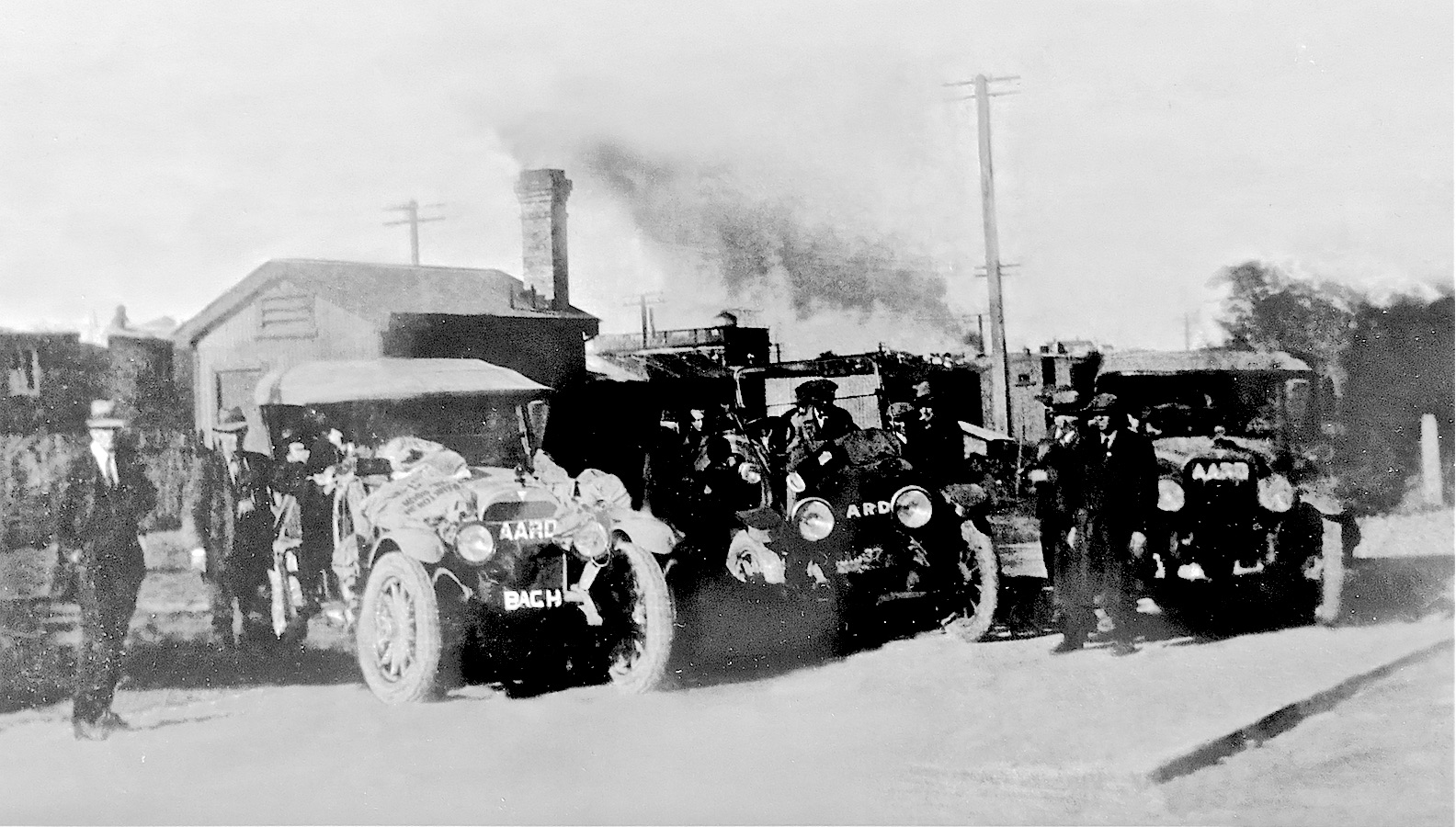
AARD Hudson buses at Frankton Junction early 1920s loaded with mailbags. The 1937 link shows that the station then had many bus connections. No bus now serves the station.

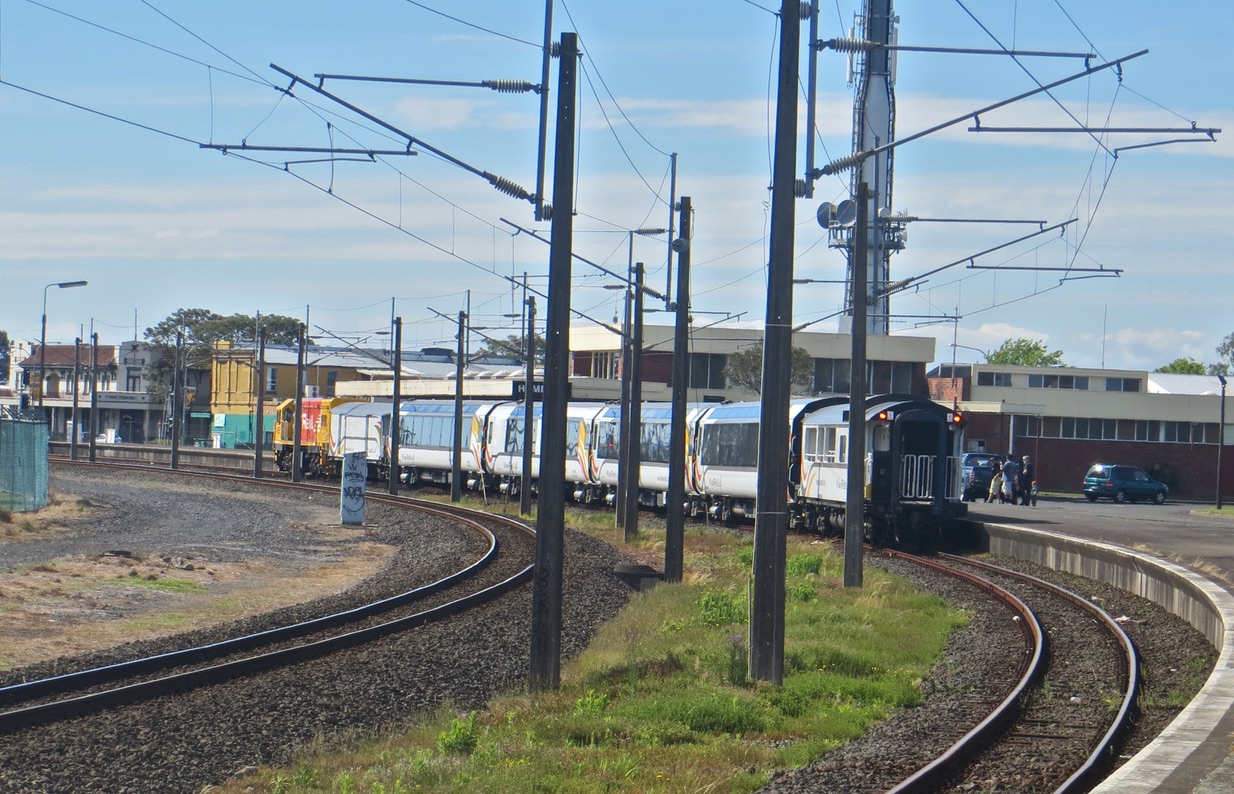
Northern Explorer at Hamilton in 2012, ready to depart for Auckland. Most of the platform canopy was removed about 2008.

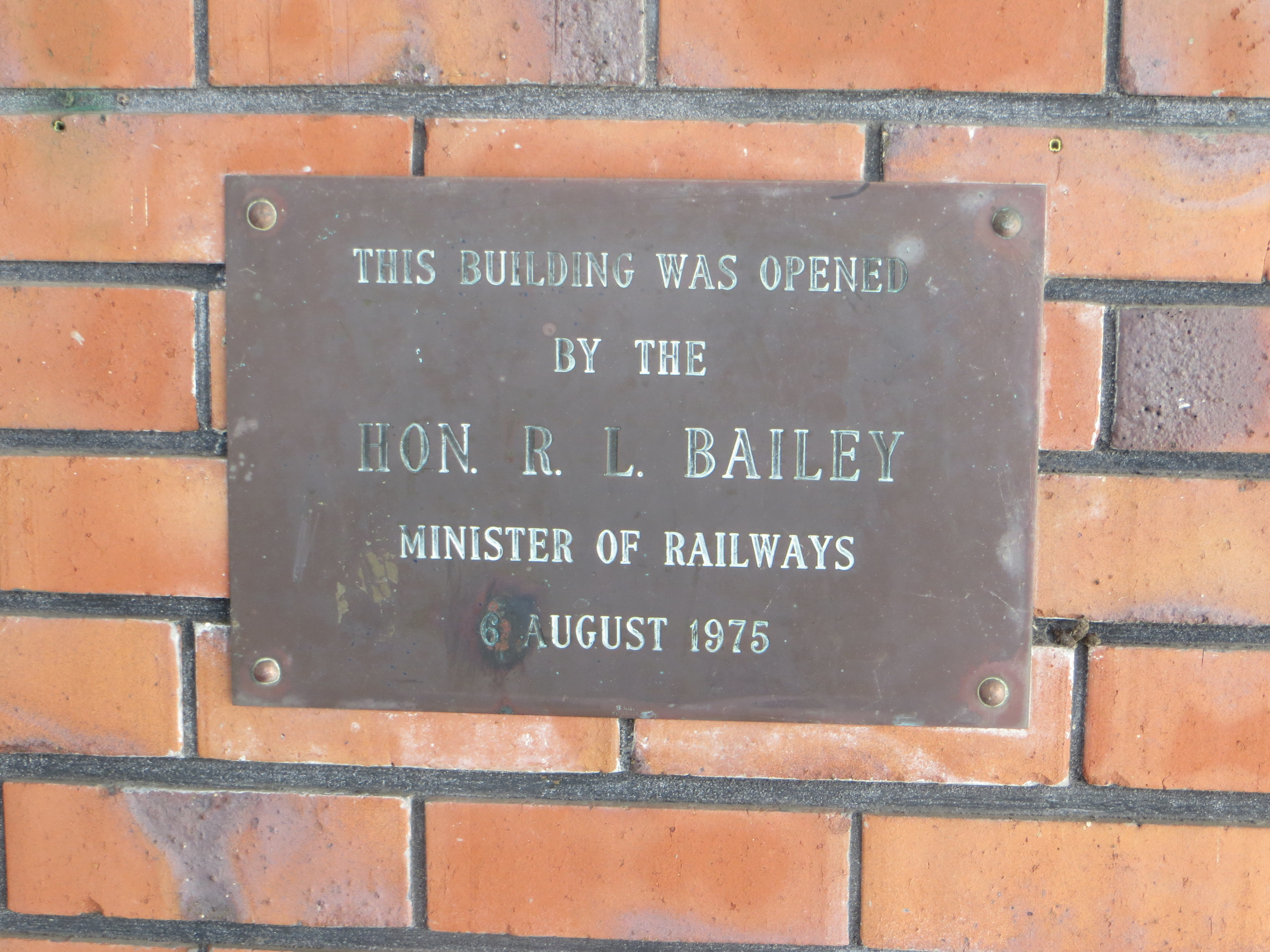
Plaque next to main entrance – opened by Ron Bailey 6 August 1975

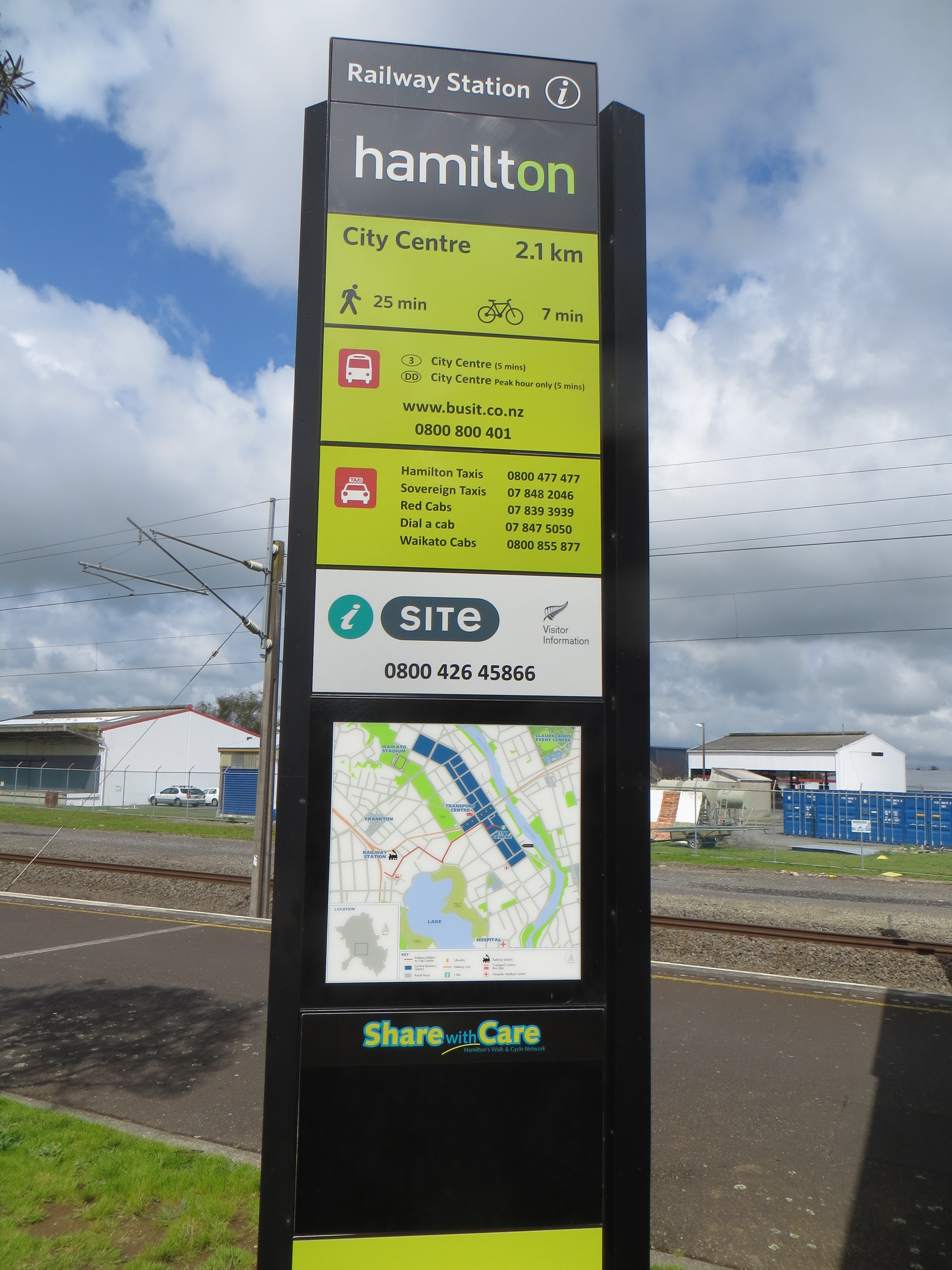
A 25-minute walk to the city centre, 7 minutes on the Western Rail Trail, or 5 minute walk to the half-hourly bus
