= Thames Express =

Overview
- Service type: Inter-city rail
- Status: Superseded
- Locale: North Island, New Zealand
- First service: 1908
- Last service: 1928
- Current operator(s): New Zealand Railways Department

Route
- Termini: Thames; Auckland Railway Station, Auckland City
- Distance travelled: 237 km (147 mi)
- Average journey time: 6 hours, 45 minutes

The Thames Express was an express passenger train operated by the New Zealand Railways Department between Auckland and Thames. It ran between 1908 and 1928.

== Introduction ==
In the early 20th century, the railways that fanned out from Auckland were isolated from the national network. South of Auckland, apart from commuter services to suburbs and townships near the city, just one dedicated passenger train operated - the Rotorua Express, which only became daily in October 1902. All other passenger services were "mixed" trains that involved one or more passenger carriages being attached to a freight service. In December 1908, just after the opening of the North Island Main Trunk railway connected the Auckland section to the rest of the North Island, the decision was taken to introduce a daily afternoon service south of Auckland to Frankton. This service continued on to Thames, with connecting trains to Cambridge and Waihi, and became known as the Thames Express.

== Operation ==
The Thames Express competed directly with the Northern Steamship Company for traffic between Thames and Auckland. Due to the circuitous nature of the railway line, the much more direct water route of the steamships afforded them an inherent advantage. The increased implementation of new A class steam locomotives allowed the express to take 6 hours 45 minutes to complete its 237 km long journey, but this did not gain many passengers from the steamships. Instead, passengers primarily used the Thames Express to travel to intermediate destinations rather than from terminus to terminus. For example, in its day, it provided the quickest transport between Thames and Hamilton.

In 1917, economic difficulties created by the conditions of World War I meant that the Thames and Rotorua Expresses were combined into a single train. They ran together between Auckland and Morrinsville and were then split to operate independently to their destinations. This practice continued until June 1919, when provincial expresses were temporarily cancelled. The Thames Express returned in December 1919 and reverted to operating separately from the Rotorua Express.

== Demise ==
In the early 1920s, the Thames Express's future looked positive as it was supplemented with another passenger service that ran from Thames to Frankton to provide a connection with the Night Limited that ran between Auckland and Wellington. This extra service was sometimes a carriage train hauled by locomotives such as the U^{D} class and sometimes a railcar service employing the experimental Sentinel-Cammell steam railcar. The opening of the East Coast Main Trunk Railway through to the Bay of Plenty in 1928 significantly reduced Thames's importance as a terminus. With the introduction of a direct express to the Bay of Plenty, the Taneatua Express, the Thames Express was superfluous and unnecessary and accordingly ceased to operate. The Night Limited feeder service did not long outlive it, and by 1947, even the mixed trains to Thames had ceased to operate and passenger services to the town were never reinstated in any form.
