= Geyserland Express =

Overview
- Service type: Inter-city
- Status: Mothballed
- Locale: North Island, New Zealand
- Predecessor: Rotorua Express
- First service: 9 December 1991
- Last service: 7 October 2001
- Former operator: Tranz Scenic

Route
- Termini: Auckland; Rotorua
- Stops: 9
- Distance travelled: 275.54 kilometres (171.21 mi)
- Average journey time: 4 Hour
- Service frequency: Daily return
- Lines used: North Island Main Trunk Line, East Coast Main Trunk Line, Kinleith Branch and Rotorua Branch

Technical
- Rolling stock: NZR RM class (Silver Fern)
- Track gauge: 3 ft 6 in (1,067 mm)

The Geyserland Express was a long distance passenger train operated by the Tranz Scenic division of Tranz Rail (previously the New Zealand Rail Limited division InterCity Rail) between Auckland and Rotorua in New Zealand's North Island. It utilised the Silver Fern railcars and operated from Monday 9 December 1991 until Sunday 7 October 2001.

== Background ==
The Rotorua Branch line had a long history of express trains between Auckland and Rotorua since the branch line opened in 1894. Until 1959, the Rotorua Express was steam-hauled and was one of New Zealand's premier trains in its heyday. It was initially only run thrice weekly in the peak Christmas and Easter period, but by 1902, it ran daily year-round, and in December 1903, dining cars were introduced. This was a rare feature for trains operated by the New Zealand Railways Department, but shortages during World War I led to their withdrawal. In the post-war period, the service was briefly cancelled in 1919, but by 1925, it was experiencing a resurgence as more powerful motive power became available in the form of A^{B} class locomotives, and in 1930, it was upgraded to become the Rotorua Limited, completing its journey in six hours. It reverted to the name Rotorua Express in 1937, and during World War II, services had to be cut to thrice weekly due to coal shortages, and then to twice weekly after the war. Patronage plummeted as travellers opted for other modes of transport, but the Rotorua Express survived to be the last provincial steam-hauled express, operating for the final time on 6 February 1959. It was replaced by an 88 seater railcar service. The introduction of railcars on this route provided a significant improvement in service, operating six days a week on a five-hour timetable. However, the railcars soon showed signs of ageing, and mechanical problems began to plague them towards the end of their service. The government of the day considered a replacement train too expensive and believed New Zealand Railways Road Services buses could provide an adequate service instead. The railcar service last operated on 11 November 1968. The only passenger trains to operate on the Rotorua Branch line for the next 23 years were chartered excursions.

== Operation ==
The introduction of the locomotive-hauled Overlander on the North Island Main Trunk Railway in December 1991 meant that the Silver Fern railcars could be deployed on new services. Two new provincial expresses were inaugurated for the Silver Ferns: the Kaimai Express between Tauranga and Auckland, and the Geyserland Express between Auckland and Rotorua. The twice daily service began operating on 9 December 1991, just over 23 years since the cancellation of the last regular passenger service to Rotorua. The morning service, train no. 401, departed Auckland at 8:45 am, reaching Rotorua at 12:45 pm; its return run, train no. 402, left Rotorua at 1:30 pm and reached Auckland at 5:30 pm. The afternoon service, train no. 403, departed Auckland at 12:45 pm and arrived in Rotorua at 4:45 pm; its return run, train no. 404, left Rotorua at 5:30 pm and arrived in Auckland at 9:30 pm.

An unfortunate situation for the new service was the terminal at Rotorua, which was now the Koutu freight yard. The line into the Travel Centre in the central city had been closed and lifted in 1990. On 9 September 1995, a new but very small passenger station operated by the Second Chance Train Trust was opened on the north side of the Lake Road bridge at the entrance to the Koutu freight yard. The new passenger station at Koutu was intended as a temporary measure until the line could be relaid to a proposed new passenger station in the central city on the corner of Ranolf and Amohau Streets, which was being pursued by the Second Chance Train Trust and the Rotorua District Council. The new station never eventuated as the Rotorua District Council would not commit funding unless Tranz Rail guaranteed that the Geyserland Express would continue to run, and Tranz Rail would not make the necessary guarantee.

In April 1995 the twice-daily afternoon services were cut back to Friday and Sunday only, due to poor patronage. A daily service still remained on all other days. In November 1996 the twice-daily afternoon services on Friday and Sunday ceased altogether.

In 2000 a timetable change was made to enable the introduction of the Waikato Connection commuter service between Hamilton and Auckland and allowed for a southbound journey of 4 hours and 13 minutes duration and a slightly longer northbound journey of 4 hours and 16 minutes duration. Under the new timetable, train no. 401 departed Auckland at 8:04 am and arrived in Rotorua at 12:17 pm, and train no. 402 departed Rotorua at 1:30 pm for a 5:46 pm arrival in Auckland.

Intermediate stops were at Middlemore, Papakura, Pukekohe, Huntly, Hamilton, Morrinsville, Matamata and Putāruru.

=== Demise ===
A lack of profitability, partly due to poor advertising and marketing of the service, led to the cancellation of the Geyserland Express early in the 21st century. At its end the train was attracting an average of only 30 to 40 passengers per day which was unsustainable and thus the final service ran on 7 October 2001.

=== Proposed reinstatement ===
Following the cancellation of the service the Geyserland Express Trust was established, seeking to re-instate the train as a five-star tourist venture under the Geyserland Express name. In response to the trust's proposal, national rail operator KiwiRail stated that it would not consider running such a service unless a third party contributed funding as the service would not be financially viable by itself. KiwiRail has also indicated that it would need to see a sound business case for reinstating the train that proves there would be sufficient demand with 120 passengers daily thought to be the number required for the service to break-even. This proposal has yet to come to fruition.

In September 2006 a joint proposal was put forward to the government by the Rail and Maritime Transport Union and the Green Party, to have long-distance passenger rail services transferred to the government-owned track company ONTRACK (now part of the KiwiRail group) and make ONTRACK an operator, with Toll NZ supplying locomotives and drivers in a "hook and tow" arrangement. They proposed reintroducing a number of regional services, Rotorua being one of these.

ONTRACK stated in 2006 that there were two tentative proposals to operate passenger services on this line.

The biggest hurdle facing the reinstatement of the Geyserland Express is that the Rotorua Branch line has been inactive and mothballed since not long after the passenger train's cessation, and although most track remains in place, it will have to be significantly repaired before it can be used again. Not having a station in the central city at Rotorua also does not help make any potential rail passenger service look attractive.
