= NZR RM class (Silver Fern) =

Class of New Zealand railcars

New Zealand RM class Silver Fern
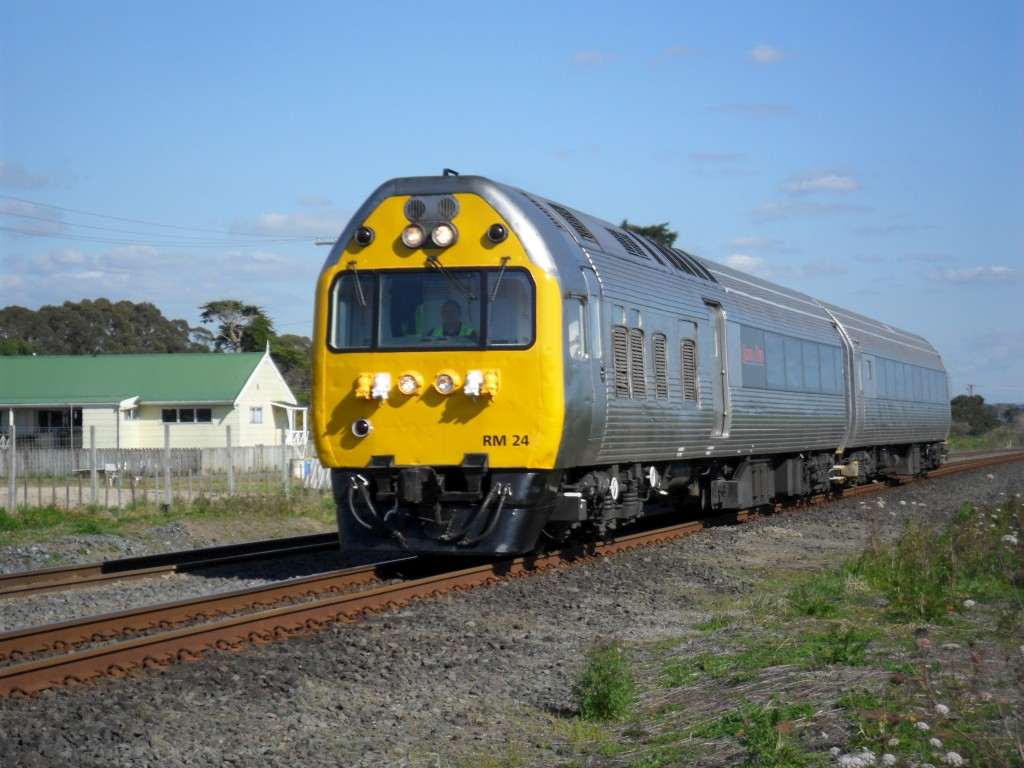
- Silver Fern railcar RM24 near Papakura
- In service: 14 December 1972 – 20 June 2019
- Manufacturer: Kawasaki Heavy Industries
- Built at: Kobe, Hyogo Prefecture, Japan
- Constructed: 1972
- Entered service: December 1972
- Number built: 3
- Fleet numbers: RM 1, 2, 3 (original); RM18, 24, 30 (TMS)
- Capacity: 96
- Operators: New Zealand Railways Department (1972–1982); New Zealand Railways Corporation (1982–1990); New Zealand Rail Limited (1990–1995); Tranz Rail (1995–2002); Auckland Regional Transport Authority (2002–2009)
- Lines served: North Island Main Trunk; Palmerston North - Gisborne Line; East Coast Main Trunk; Rotorua Branch

Specifications
- Train length: 47.4 metres (155 ft 6 in) total
- Car length: 22.86 metres (75 ft 0 in)
- Width: 2.74 metres (9 ft 0 in)
- Maximum speed: 120 km/h (75 mph)
- Weight: 107 tonnes (105 long tons; 118 short tons)
- Prime mover: Caterpillar D398TA
- Power output: 670 kW (900 hp)
- Track gauge: 3 ft 6 in (1,067 mm)

The NZR RM class Silver Fern was a class of rail motor in New Zealand. The three air-conditioned and sound-proofed 723-kW 96-seater diesel-electric twin-set railcars were built by Kawasaki under contract with Nissho Iwai of Japan. New Zealand Railways (NZR) classified the railcars as RM (Rail Motor), (Note: Until the 1930s, "Rail Motor" was the more common name for railcar) the same as other railcars, using the Silver Ferns (a national symbol of New Zealand) because of their exterior was made of corrugated stainless steel, like the premier night sleeper train that also ran on the Wellington-Auckland (North Island Main Trunk) route, the Silver Star. The Silver Ferns replaced the three successful Blue Streak railcars on the service.

== History ==
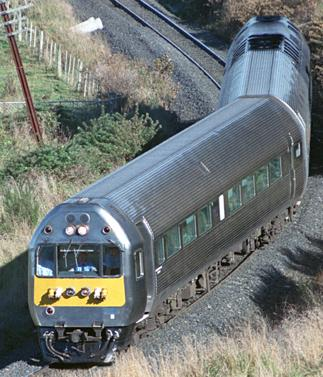
A Silver Fern near Warrington in April 1989

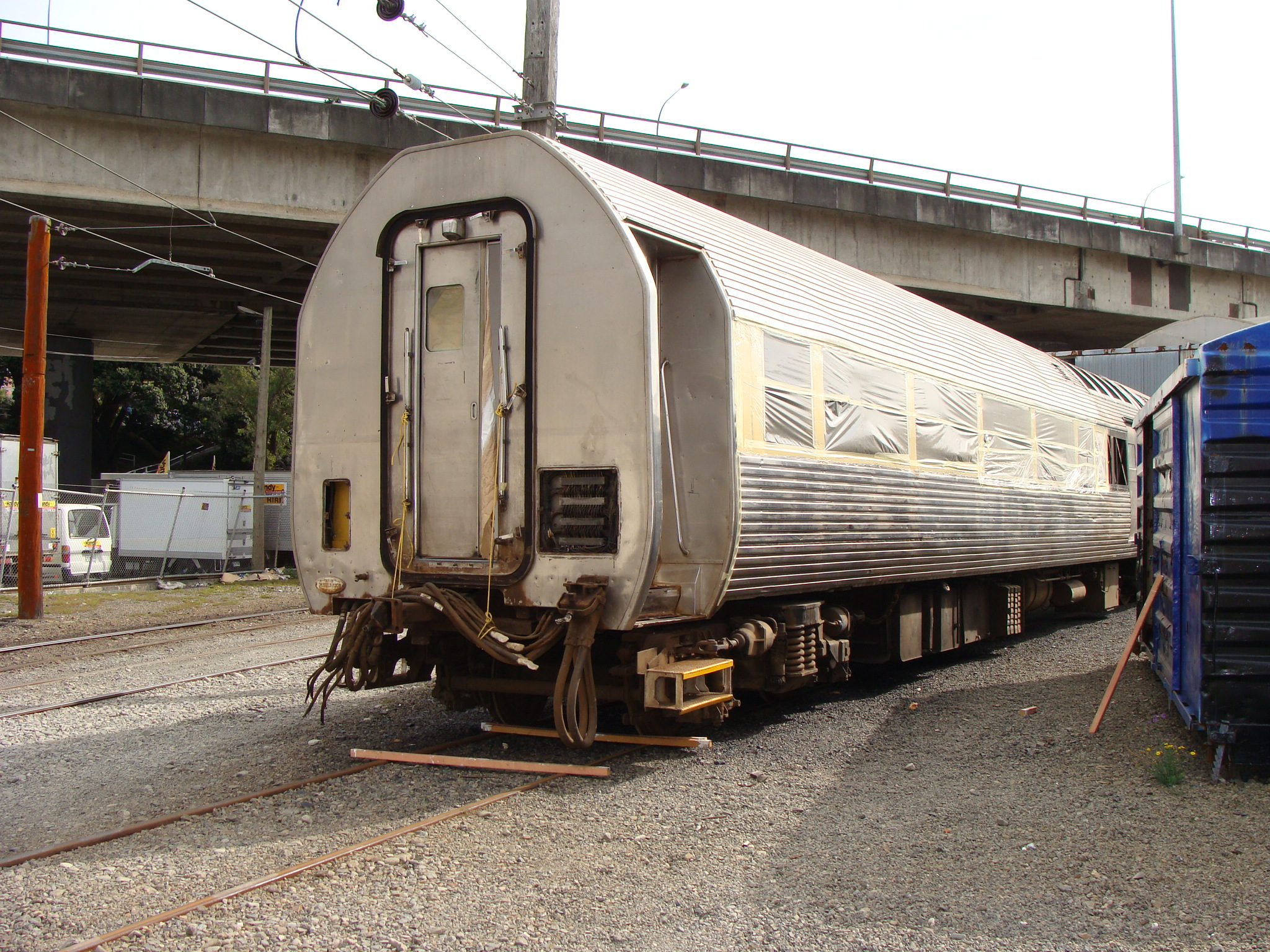
Silver Fern RM30 under refurbishment at the Wellington Passenger Depot, April 2009

The railcars are most well known for their service on the eponymous North Island Main Trunk daylight passenger train between Auckland and Wellington between 14 December 1972 and 8 December 1991. Intermediate stops were at Palmerston North, Marton, Taihape, Waiouru, Ohakune, National Park, Taumarunui, Te Kuiti, Hamilton and Papakura.

Under trade by Nissho Iwai, the Silver Ferns were built by Kawasaki and Toshiba and introduced in 1972 to replace older but refurbished Blue Streak railcars on the route. The success of the Blue Streaks had ensured there was a business case for NZR to purchase the three Silver Fern railcars. The Blue Streaks were then reallocated to the Wellington-New Plymouth service until the cancellation of railcar services to New Plymouth in 1977.

Following the withdrawal of the Silver Star in 1979, there was a proposal to rebuild that train's carriages as day-carriages and replace the Silver Fern on the Wellington-Auckland daytime service. The Silver Fern railcars would then be reallocated to the South Island to run the Picton-Christchurch service. Due to the rebuilding of the Silver Star's carriages not proceeding, this proposal never came to fruition.

On 9 December 1991, the Silver Fern was replaced by the locomotive hauled Overlander. The railcars were transferred to two newly introduced services: the Kaimai Express between Auckland and Tauranga and the Geyserland Express between Auckland and Rotorua. On 26 June 2000, a third service was added, the Waikato Connection between Auckland and Hamilton. All three services ceased on 7 October 2001.

On 14 October 2002, two of the class were employed on Auckland Regional Transport Authority (ARTA) commuter services between Auckland and Pukekohe. The services were operated by Veolia Auckland as part of its contract with ARTA, with the units leased from Tranz Scenic, later KiwiRail.

This lease expired in 2009 and the units were replaced by additional carriage services. This freed the units for charter and other services, such as KiwiRail's "Explore by Rail" specials. In 2010, a major refurbishment of the units commenced in Wellington to extend services, with the program completed by mid-2011. A petition by the Campaign for Better Transport which received around 11,500 signatures to start a Waikato rail service between Hamilton and Auckland (like the Waikato Connection which ceased in 2001), it was possible that RM18 and RM24 would be used to provide the service, yet late in 2011 the councils involved voted against the Waikato Connection reinstatement would not go ahead. The proposal fell through late in 2011.

== In service ==
The Silver Fern offered airline-style service on board. Drinks, snacks and morning newspapers were supplied to passengers. From 1972 to 1988, there was a lunch stop at Taihape for services in both directions. That was replaced by airline-style meals heated on board, and Taihape railway station dining room was closed, the station later being demolished and replaced by a shelter.

=== Charter use ===
Following a refurbishment of RM30, Tranz Scenic operated various excursion services under the Explore by Rail brand. The first of these excursion services was the Silver Fern - Otaki and Beyond Tour which commenced on 19 September 2009. This saw RM30 travelling from Wellington to Feilding and return on 5 Saturdays between September and December 2009. Since the Otaki and Beyond Tour, RM 30 has been used on other Explore by Rail services including:

- A special Valentine's Day trip on 14 February 2010 from Wellington to Chateau Tongariro (via National Park) for an overnight stay.
- East Coast Explorer: Ran during Easter weekend 2010. This saw RM30 leave Wellington on Friday heading to Napier, then up to Gisborne on Saturday and return on Sunday. The service will then return to Wellington on Monday.
- Hawkes Bay Weekender: Operated every second weekend of each month between May and October 2010. This service departs Wellington and travels up to Napier on Saturday and returns to Wellington on Sunday.
- ANZAC Day - National Park Tour: A special ANZAC weekend service where travelers will go from Wellington to Chateau Tongariro (via National Park) on Saturday. On the Sunday travelers will leave Chateau Tongariro for Waiouru where they will be taken to the Queen Elizabeth II Army Memorial Museum where travelers attended an ANZAC service followed by a tour of the museum before heading back to Wellington.

=== Dunedin Railways ===
From October 2012 to June 2019, RM24 was leased to Dunedin Railways for excursions, tours and charters around the South Island. After the lease expired, the railcar was handed back to KiwiRail in June 2019. At the same time, RM18 and RM30 were stored at the Otahuhu passenger maintenance depot.

== Upgrades ==
During October 2008, RM30 was taken to the Wellington Passenger Depot for extensive refurbishment. This work included the stripping of the interior in the passenger saloons, allowing corrosion repairs to be carried out. New thermal, noise deadening insulation was added.

The interiors now have new carpet and refurbished seats. Each seat bay now also has a power socket for passenger use. Tables have been added with mahogany veneer, echoing the new timber-featured ceiling with ash and mahogany from sustainable forestry. Lighting was upgraded to modern energy-efficient standards, including individual reading lights in the new coat racks. Also fitted were large, triple glazed windows, to give a more panoramic view. No significant mechanical work is believed to have been undertaken. The two other railcars were refurbished in 2009.

In February 2015, RM30 was refurbished for a second time. New seats, a new engine and the power bogie from RM18 were fitted. RM18 was out of service at this time, owing to a lack of spare parts, and never returned to service. RM30 was tested on a mainline run from Otahuhu on 11 February 2015.

In 2019, all three railcars were transferred to Dunedin for evaluation at the Hillside Workshops. RM30 has corrosion in the steel frames around window openings.

== Accidents ==
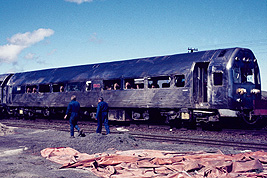
The wrecked railcar after it was towed to Tangiwai from the wreck site.

On 18 August 1981, half of the first and second sets derailed and rolled north of Waiouru when the northbound service was descending curves. Passengers reported that the railcar had been travelling quickly over this section of the journey and the speed around curves just before the derailment had been concerning. The subsequent enquiry found that many of the speed restriction boards for the curves in the area were missing or misleading; a full audit of speed restrictions across the entire rail network was one of the enquiry outcomes. Four people were killed and another 16 injured. The railcars were replaced by the "Blue Fern" on Wednesdays for three years until May 1984, to allow the two remaining railcar sets to be serviced while the damaged set was being repaired.

In 1989 and again in 1990, the Blue Fern train ran instead of railcars after Silver Fern railcar RM18 was involved in an accident.

== Disposal and preservation ==
In 2019, the two remaining serviceable Silver Ferns, RM24 and RM30, were withdrawn from service. RM18 was transferred to Christchurch so that the fleet were in the same place. KiwiRail planned major overhauls on the railcars, but the COVID-19 pandemic brought those plans to an end. KiwiRail then sold the railcars to the Pahiatua Railcar Society in September 2020 as there was no future in cruise ship traffic for a number of years. All three Railcars were transferred to Pahiatua in late 2020, and RM30 has been overhauled ready for the 50th Anniversary of the Railcars entering service in late 2022.

== See also ==
- Locomotives of New Zealand
