= Waikato Connection =

Overview
- Service type: Inter-city
- Status: Terminated
- Locale: Waikato, New Zealand
- First service: 26 June 2000
- Last service: 7 October 2001
- Former operator: Tranz Scenic

Route
- Termini: Hamilton; Auckland
- Stops: 5
- Distance travelled: 134.75 kilometres (83.73 mi)
- Average journey time: 124 minutes
- Service frequency: Daily return

Technical
- Rolling stock: NZR RM class (Silver Fern)
- Track gauge: 3 ft 6 in (1,067 mm)

The Waikato Connection was a short-lived express passenger train between Hamilton and Auckland in New Zealand's North Island. It consisted of a weekday single return service using diesel multiple unit railcars.

Like its southern counterpart, the Capital Connection between Palmerston North and Wellington, the service was operated by Tranz Scenic and run as a commercial venture.

The service was restored in 2021 for a five-year trial as "Te Huia".

== History ==
=== Operation ===
The service commenced as a six-month trial on Thursday 26 June 2000 and was primarily aimed at business people who regularly commuted to work in Auckland. It used Silver Fern railcars with full onboard catering and stopped at the intermediate stations of Huntly, Pukekohe, Papakura, Middlemore, and Newmarket.

Four months into the trial the service was reported to be "performing up to expectations" and was later extended beyond the trial period.

=== Demise ===
Tranz Rail announced in October 2000 that it intended to exit the passenger rail business to concentrate on its freight interests. The new owner of Tranz Scenic, two directors of West Coast Railway in Australia, had limited purchase funds, and so were only prepared to purchase the most profitable services, prompting Tranz Rail to terminate those services that were not purchased, including the Waikato Connection. It was officially cancelled on Sunday 7 October 2001 along with the Geyserland Express, the Kaimai Express, and the Bay Express. A replacement Tranz Metro service between Auckland and Pukekohe commenced the following day.

Efforts were made to save the service prior to its cancellation, including an investigation made by Environment Waikato into the possibility of subsidising it. The council, which at the time had a policy of not subsidising rail services, decided against providing funding at $400,000 pa, which was deemed to be too expensive. An approach was also made to the government for funding, especially in light of the subsidy that they had extended for the Southerner, but this was also declined. Tranz Scenic reported that the Waikato Connection was "the most unprofitable service" but that they would be prepared to consider retaining it with community support which they expected would be needed for about three years.

At the time of its cancellation the Waikato Connection was being patronised by an average of 129 passengers per trip, most of whom boarded at Pukekohe or Papakura, with only about 30 of those travelling the full distance between Hamilton and Auckland. Some considered the cancellation premature as the service was beginning to grow in popularity.

== Predecessor ==
A refurbished NZR RM class (88 seater) nicknamed the Blue Streak was used for a trial Hamilton–Auckland service from 8 April 1968, which was discontinued for lack of patronage.

== Reintroduction ==
The service was reintroduced on 6 April 2021 as Te Huia, running between The Strand in Auckland and Hamilton.
