= Silver Star (NZR train) =

Former New Zealand Passenger Train

The Silver Star
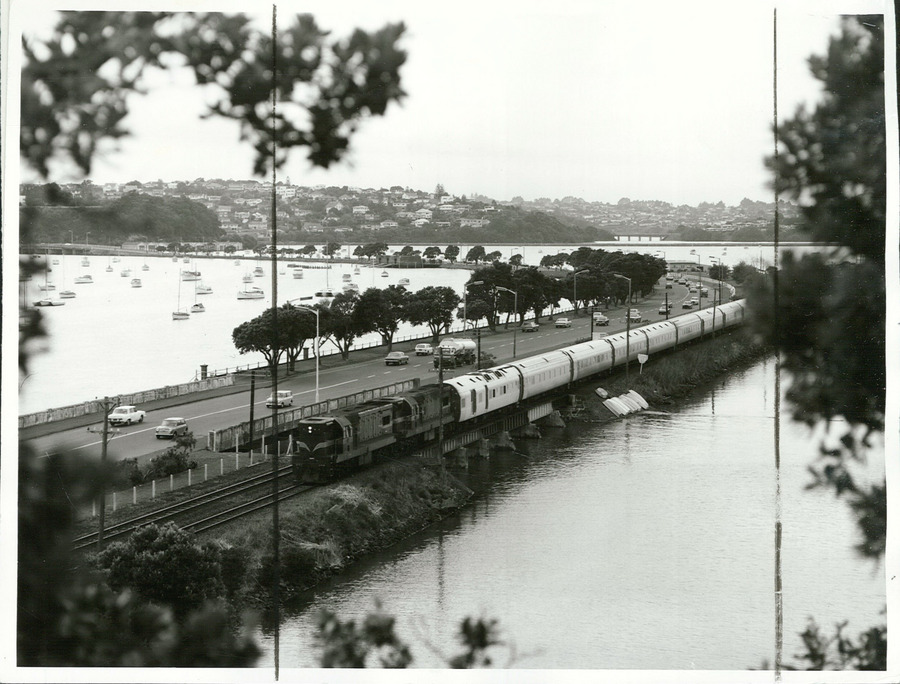
- Silver Star arriving in Auckland alongside Hobson Bay and Tamaki Drive in March 1973, hauled by two D^{A} class locomotives.

Overview
- Service type: Overnight Passenger Train
- Status: Terminated
- Predecessor: Night Limited
- First service: 6 September 1971
- Last service: 8 June 1979
- Successor: Northerner
- Former operator: New Zealand Railways Department (NZR)

Route
- Termini: Wellington; Auckland
- Line used: North Island Main Trunk

Technical
- Rolling stock: AR/AT class Silver Star carriages
- Track gauge: 1,067 mm (3 ft 6 in)

The Silver Star was a luxury passenger train that ran overnight between Auckland and Wellington on the North Island Main Trunk (NIMT) railway of New Zealand, operated by New Zealand Railways (NZR). The train ran from Monday 6 September 1971 until Sunday 8 June 1979. It replaced the Night Limited express passenger trains which provided a faster service than the ordinary express trains, by stopping at only six intermediate stations (Palmerston North, Marton, Taumarunui, Taihape, Te Kuiti, Frankton) en route and not hauling a postal (sorting) van as on previous trains.

Designed as a "hotel on wheels", the service was unsuccessful and attempts to re-use the rolling stock were thwarted by the presence of asbestos in the carriages. NZR eventually sold the carriages for use on the Eastern & Oriental Express, where they remain in use.

== Introduction ==
The train was NZR's attempt to compete with the introduction of jet aircraft for business traffic between Auckland and Wellington. It was intended to improve the Railway's staff morale and image, and the concept was based on a shorter version of New South Wales Government Railways Southern Aurora, with its 75-foot, 20-berth sleeping carriages introduced in 1962, providing Pullman-style luxury equal to the last United States trains, the Broadway Limited, the San Francisco Chief, the Crescent and the Panama Limited. Planning for the new Auckland to Wellington overnight express began in 1963, and the concept of the train as two sets of all stainless-steel sleeping carriage trains, the north and southbound trains, usually consisting of 10 sleeping carriages, five with double and twin ensuite rooms and five more sleepers with single bedrooms (16 beds per carriage), a licensed buffet carriage and a power carriage, never changed.

The public announcement of plans for the new train was made in December 1965. Extensive study was made of other early 1960s Australian overnight trains, particularly the Queensland Rail The Sunlander, the Victorian Railways/South Australian Railways The Overland, and similar designs in the United States, such as the final Santa Fe Railroad Hi-Level and Burlington Railroad carriages.

NZR staff were preoccupied with rail freight van and wagon design and this slowed the Silver Star design and meant both redesign and reconstruction of existing carriages for the Northerner and projected carriages for provincial express trains were limited and delayed until 1974, when Minister of Railways, Ron Bailey said NZR workshops could build only four carriages a year, in addition to wagon building. NZR carriage production had finished in 1946 and the first class and sleeping carriage designs built by NZR between 1938-1946 would have been costly to build in small production runs and were too small and narrow to accommodate economical numbers of sleeping units or reclining seats with leg rests. The final 1946 model NZR first-class seats later used on the Endeavour were estimated by NZR Chief Mechanical Engineer John Black in 1958 to have increased in cost from £5,940 in 1941 to £25,000 in 1958 for a second-class carriage, and from £7,140 to £35,000 for a first-class carriage.

In 1966, the NZR General Manager Alan Gandell said that two modern express trains were being designed for the NIMT, to have sleeper accommodation and a buffet carriage but not a dining carriage; to be introduced in three to four years. Travel time would be cut from 13½ hours to between 11½ and 12 hours.

In 1967, the new train was promoted by the Minister of Railways, J.B. Gordon, on the grounds that it would deliver a clear return on its purchase cost and operation. Most equivalent overseas passenger rail services ceased that year and following the US Postal Service ending its use of almost all North American rail passenger services for first-class mail in September 1967. Santa Fe applied to the Interstate Commerce Commission to withdraw 33 out of 39 of the long-distance express passenger trains they ran, all but the Super Chief, San Francisco Chief, Texas Chief, and two Los Angeles-San Diego local trains.

The New Zealand Government Railways approved tendering for an all-sleeping carriage train on 19 November 1968, with 6 tenders in by the close on 9 April 1969. The order for the train was placed with mid-1969 with Hitachi and Nippon Sharyo.

The Silver Star carriages were distinctive in New Zealand in unpainted stainless steel, rather than the traditional red of NZR passenger carriages. Original planning for the train envisaged the sleeping carriages as the basis of new-standard NZR passenger trains of six carriages and van, seven units of 30 tons each (210 tons) hauled by a D^{A} class locomotive. The Silver Star carriages, weighing 38 tons far away from the light 25-ton, 55-foot stainless steel carriages recommended as the future by John Black in 1958, the standard on Queensland Rail for most trains and the flagship Sunlander to sleeping carriages with a 9 ft 9 in loading gauge. As a result, the usual Silver Star consisted of 38-ton carriages that would weigh 410 tons and contribute to heavy fuel use estimates and counted against the NZR business case for new trains between 1973 and 1976, with sharp increases in fuel costs after the 1973 Arab-Israeli war. NZR's requirement was for the D^{X} class locomotives introduced in 1972 to haul the heavier carriages as well as express freight trains on the NIMT.

== In service ==
The Silver Star service broke new ground in New Zealand by providing a whole onboard crew of stewards (sourced from the inter-island rail ferry service) who doubled as dining carriage staff at mealtimes. A great deal of study had been made of on-train meal provision, particularly of Deutsche Bahn and British Railways. The high wage and other industrial demands of the ferry stewards were one of the reasons the service failed. The product was 10 years too late. Travel by National Airways Corporation Boeing 737-200 between Auckland and Wellington took just over one hour; the Silver Star, by contrast, took around 12 hours and 30 minutes, thus the business market was lost. Due to the freeze on rail fares and charges imposed by the Kirk Labour Government, which effectively meant the price from Wellington to Auckland was held at $18 from late 1971 to early 1976, use of the train was high in 1974-75 and 1975-76. In the late 1970s, the usual overnight patronage was only about 65 minutes on most runs and only half the carriage stock was used for most of the year except during a few airline strikes.

== Withdrawal ==
In March 1979, the General Manager of NZR, Trevor Hayward, in his booklet Time for Change noted that the average subsidy per passenger on the Silver Star was $20.00, then a substantial amount of money. The service was withdrawn not long after, on Sunday 10 June 1979.

== Rolling Stock and motive power ==
The 31 carriages were manufactured by Hitachi and Nippon Sharyo and hauled by diesel-electric locomotives (initially two D^{A} class, and later one D^{X} class) for a six-night-per-week service. All passengers were accommodated in sleeping cars, with 12 of these carriages being designated "Twinette" (8 x two-berth cabins incorporating separate bathrooms/showers for each cabin) and 12 being "Roomette" carriages (16 x single-berth cabins with toilet and basin facilities). Passengers could purchase dinner, breakfast and other refreshments during the night, including alcoholic beverages and souvenirs in the buffet car, of which three were built, with 42 alcove-style tables. Four power and baggage vans completed the fleet.

The carriages were 18.89 metres (62 ft 0 in) long, 2.97 metres (9 ft 9 in) wide and 3.75 metres (12 ft 4 in) high.

=== Bogies ===
All 31 carriages ran on bogies of a newer design, classed X28250 by NZR, which offered a superior quality ride through inertial dampers and better suspension and bore a resemblance to the Kinki-Sharyo-manufactured bogies, classed X27250 by NZR, under steam and postal vans built by Kinki. The bogies constructed especially for the Northerner trains four years later and the FM-class guards vans two to six years after that, and classed X28280, were heavily modelled on those under the Silver Star.

== Replacement ==
New Zealand Railways at the time also ran another overnight train service (the Night Express) which stopped at more than twice the number of stations than the Silver Star did, which had much older rolling stock, and which had no onboard buffet service. It did have cheaper fares and three classes of accommodation. By refurbishing this train in 1975 to become the Northerner, many rail passengers had the option to pay around 33% less for a large reclining seat or 15% less for a 2-berth sleeper cabin without shower or toilet than pay for a Silver Star cabin.

The Railways Department attempted to replace the Northerner and Silver Star with a refurbished version which would be a 50% seating and 50% sleeper train. This plan would include the redeployment of eight 30-seat carriages from the Northerner fleet to the Wellington-Napier Endeavour service, and relocation of the three 32-seat and three 36-seat Endeavour carriages onto the Christchurch-Picton route. These plans came to nothing after the Silver Star stock was withdrawn from service and blue asbestos insulation was found inside the coaches. The union workforce refused to work with the dangerous material, and the carriages lay parked in sidings for over ten years while their future was debated. In 1982, Minister of Railways, George Gair, facing a cost of $7 million for the asbestos removal and modernisation of the carriages, as well as rail losses and demand for other new rail equipment, commissioned Boston consultants, Booz Allen & Hamilton, to review NZR and in particular to investigate the most economical way of providing rail passenger options. The Ministry of Transport refused to accept the NZR estimate that the rebuilt Silver Star would exceed the Northerner's patronage by 60% and operate profitably

The Railways then suggested that higher utilisation of the rebuilt Silver Star carriages would be achieved by using them on both night and day services on the NIMT, allowing Silver Fern railcars, to be redeployed on other routes. In 1985 Minister of Railways, Richard Prebble delayed a decision, and—with the full expected cost of removing the blue asbestos and reconstructing the train having reached $20million—cancelled the conversion in line with the Booz Allen Report, which found modern railcar train-sets vastly more economical than small locomotive-hauled trains. By 1986, the NZR general manager considered the conversion of the Silver Star into a seating-only train as an uneconomical way of renewing the Northerner or Endeavour trains.

In December 1987, the Silver Star carriages were hauled from Wellington to Auckland, where private tourist firm Pacific Trailways intended to convert 27 of them into a luxury tourist train that would travel around both the North and South Islands for NZ$1,000 per passenger. Nothing eventuated, and all the carriages languished in Auckland for two more years.

In January 1990, the 31-car fleet was purchased by the British luxury travel company, Orient-Express Trains & Cruises (an offshoot of Orient-Express Hotels) and taken to A&G Price, of Thames (New Zealand), for regauging from New Zealand's 1,067 mm (3 ft 6 in) gauge to 1,000 mm (3 ft 3 3/8 in) gauge for Thai and Malaysian railway lines. 24 carriages (19 sleepers, three buffet carriages and two power vans) went to Singapore, where an extensive internal rebuild and fit-out, as well as exterior painting and badging, was undertaken by the new owners at their (then) newly-constructed maintenance depot on KTMB land in Singapore's Keppel Road rail yards. A 25th car also went to Singapore and was stored unrefurbished for some years, but was scrapped when E&O moved its engineering workshop from Singapore to Johor. Since then the refurbished consist has operated a regular 5-star luxury cruise-train service between Singapore (now the Woodlands customs terminal on the island's northern coast) and Bangkok as the Eastern & Oriental Express.

Six carriages subsequently remained (still owned by Orient-Express) at A&G Price in Thames: two Twinettes, two Roomettes, and two power vans. They had had their interiors stripped, asbestos removed, and were no longer on bogies, and put up for sale from December 2012 until 2016. All six were sold to individual buyers.
