= Te Huia =

Passenger train service in New Zealand

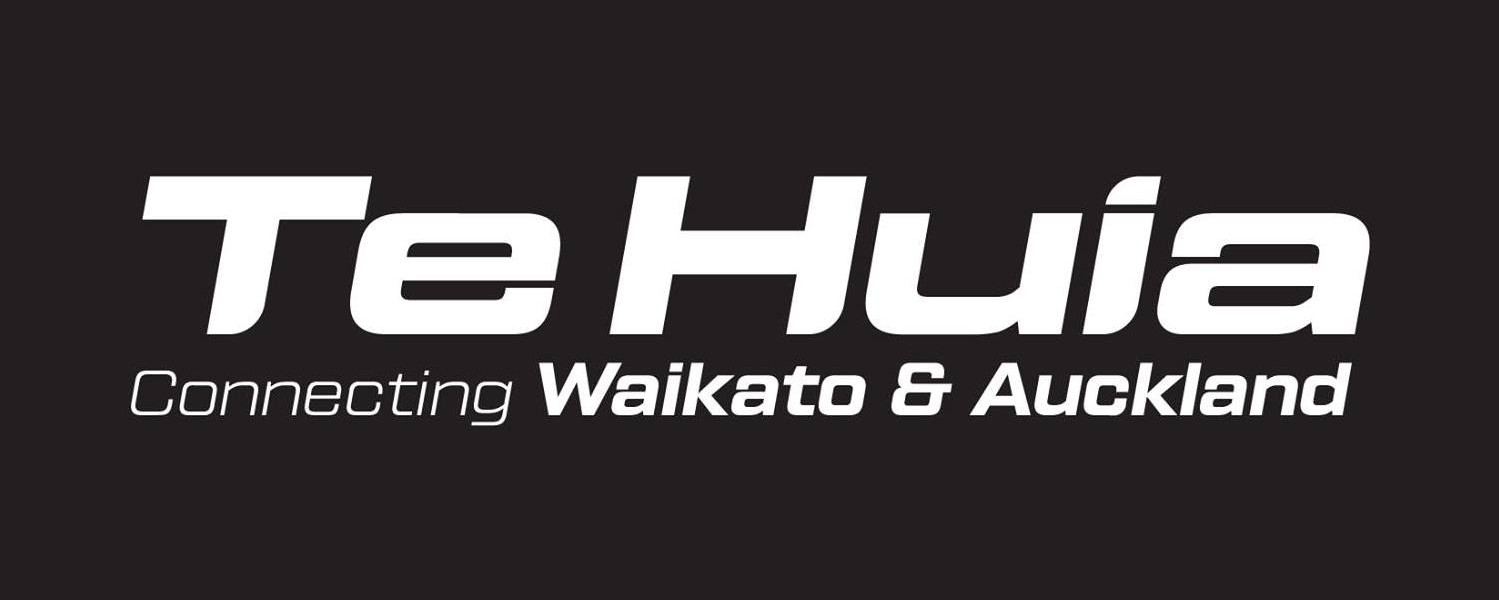

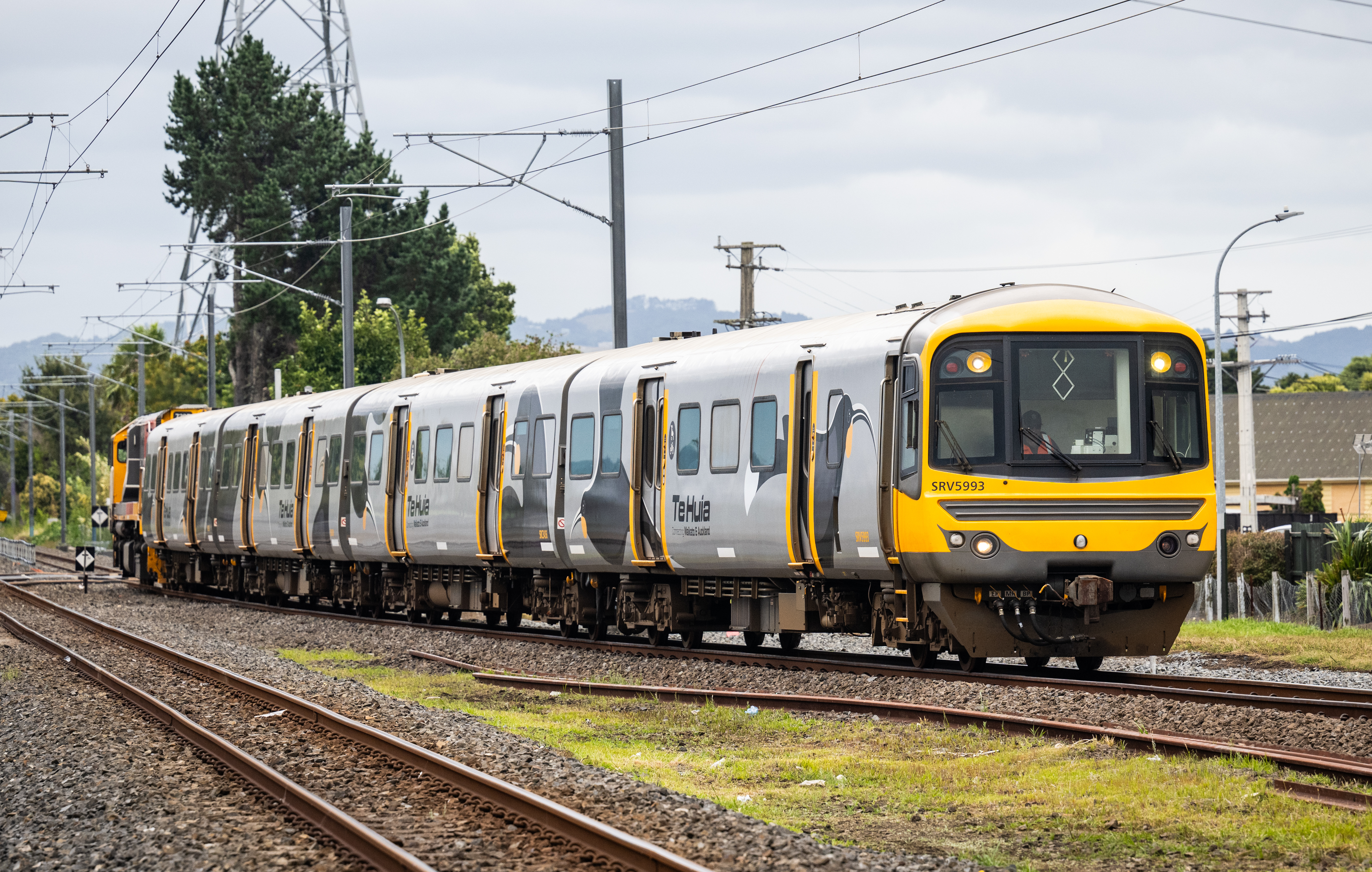
- Te Huia train travelling through Takanini

Overview
- Service type: Inter-city
- Status: Operating
- Locale: Waikato (New Zealand), Auckland (New Zealand)
- Predecessor: Waikato Connection
- First service: 6 April 2021
- Current operator: KiwiRail
- Ridership: 64,873 (2025)
- Website: tehuiatrain.co.nz

Route
- Termini: Hamilton; Auckland (Strand)
- Stops: 6
- Distance travelled: 138.37 kilometres (85.98 mi)
- Average journey time: 2 hours, 36 minutes
- Service frequency: Monday to Wednesday: Twice-daily return Thursday and Friday: Thrice-daily return Saturday: Twice-daily return Sunday: Once-daily return

On-board services
- Seating arrangements: 147
- Catering facilities: Yes – a café / bar
- Other facilities: Wi-Fi, Bike Storage, and Toilets

Technical
- Rolling stock: New Zealand DL class locomotive and SR, SRC and SRV class carriages
- Track gauge: 3 ft 6 in (1,067 mm)

Te Huia is a passenger train service connecting the major cities of Hamilton and Auckland in the North Island of New Zealand. The service is a five-year trial with subsidies from the NZ Transport Agency and Waikato local authorities. The opening was delayed because of COVID-19 and the need to replace some rail track. A new starting date was announced, and the service began on 6 April 2021.

As of February 2026, the service is being funded by the NZ Transport Agency and Waikato Regional Council up until 30 June 2027.

== Initial proposals ==
After the June 2006 announcement of the Overlander's cancellation, there were proposals to re-instate the Waikato Connection, including from Dave Macpherson, Hamilton City Council's Passenger Transport Committee chairman. The Overlander's cancellation was subsequently rescinded, eliminating the possibility of using its rolling stock on a new Waikato Connection, but other proposals have remained due to increased vehicular traffic volumes straining road capacity. These proposals include using the Silver Fern railcars as in the original Waikato Connection, though they were at the time under contract for suburban commuter trains between Auckland and Pukekohe. Proposals were floated in 2007 to reinstate the service. An interim proposal from the Rail Working Group in 2011 recommended further assessment of three options:

a) A Silver Fern railcar from Hamilton to Papakura with a transfer to the MAXX service at Papakura
b) Extension of the MAXX service to Hamilton
c) The composite train option (Silver Fern railcar coupled to the back of an existing MAXX service at Pukekohe).

This proposal addressed cost concerns raised by the affected local government organisations by making use of existing rolling stock and infrastructure where possible and avoiding use of the Britomart Transport Centre which, because of capacity constraints, was not available for peak-time arrivals and departures of such a service.

The proposal was dropped on a 2011 report in favour of extension only from Pukekohe to Tuakau, but that was also shelved. In 2016 the Transport Minister said, when starting work on a parallel section of Waikato Expressway costing over $2bn, "it will be some time before it makes its case economically".

A further study to establish a strategic business case was started in 2017. It identified the lack of a third line to Auckland and consequently, a journey time of over 2h 20m as obstacles. Regional Council's 2018 Long Term Plan consultation also includes a question asking whether Hamilton ratepayers will pay about $11 a year for a skeleton commuter service from Hamilton to Papakura. A paper for the same plan proposes a Hamilton–Papakura bus link, taking 1h 20m, 10 minutes faster and much cheaper, at an estimated annual cost of $54,000.

== Re-introduction of service ==
The Sixth Labour Government promised commuter rail in 18 months to Hamilton and commuter rail to Hamilton and Tauranga. Hamilton residents want a passenger service right into Auckland (Britomart if possible). Labour MP Jamie Strange expected the service to be operating by the end of 2019. A 2018 Waikato Regional Council plan aimed to have more than 95% of peak rail trips completed in less than 2h 30m (compared with 50% by road) within 5 years, 2h within 15 years and eventually 90 minutes (90 km/h (56 mph) average).

In 2019, the unofficially popular name of Tron Express was announced and the start date further delayed to mid-2020. But Tron received fewest positive comments and was the least well liked in focus groups, so Te Huia was then recommended by two Waikato councils. In 2019, there was also discussion over the level of NZTA funding.

Detailed planning in 2018 put the start date back to March 2020. The delayed supply of new bogies from overseas delayed by two months the startup from March to May 2020. The service introduction was then delayed to November 2020 by the COVID-19 pandemic.

The need to replace some rail track in the Auckland area (including Papakura) where slow (40 km/h (25 mph)) speed limits would otherwise be required had meant that the likely start month has been put back to February 2021. It was later announced to begin 6 April 2021.

In November 2018, the proposed service from March 2020 was expected to take 91 minutes from Frankton to Papakura, stopping at Rotokauri and Huntly; and transferring at Papakura to another train to take 2h 29m total to Britomart.

In 2018 KiwiRail planned that the service would run Monday to Friday (two trains) and Saturday (one train), with a running time of 88 minutes, between Hamilton railway station and Papakura railway station, with stops at Rotokauri (a new station near The Base shopping mall on the outskirts of Hamilton and the site of the former Te Rapa railway station) and Huntly railway station (to be upgraded).

In late 2020, Waikato Regional Council published Te Huia's website. The new planned journey time was extended to 98 minutes (Frankton to Papakura), with intermediate stops at Rotokauri and Huntly. The fares are Adult $12.20 (Hamilton Stations-Papakura) with a Bee Card, or $17 without. Cheaper or Free fares are available for Children, Students, SuperGold (Saturdays), and Accessibility. From 12 July 2021 the Hamilton-Papakura fares were $12 with a card and $20 without and the same fares applied to Saturday services to Strand. Fares in 2023 were $9 and $15 respectively.

=== Patronage ===
Monthly Te Huia Ridership April 2021 to October 2026
Month	Jan	Feb	Mar	Apr	May	Jun	Jul	Aug	Sep	Oct	Nov	Dec	Yearly Total
Year	2021												
Ridership				3,855^{†}	3,220	2,658	3,911	1,528^{†}					15,172
Year	2022												
Ridership	578^{†}	1,592	2,177	6,097	5,506	4,981	7,609	5,805	6,677	7,147	6,231	4,864^{†}	59,264
Year	2023												
Ridership	3,056^{†}	3,825	7,120	6,692	5,707	5,813	4,994	8,164	6,433	6,172	6,000	5,189^{†}	69,165
Year	2024												
Ridership	3,428^{†}	6,340	7,471	9,212	9,466	6,882	8,572	7,867	7,050	7,516	7,343	5,230^{†}	86,377
Year	2025												
Ridership	975^{†}	5,964	7,208	3,149^{†}	6,610	5,096^{†}	4,161^{†}	8,175	4,802^{†}	5,795	7,173	5,902	64,873
Year	2026												
Ridership	2,724^{†}	6,542	8,308	7,688	8,496	7,369	8,843	8,227	8,909	10,847			

^{†} Months with significantly reduced service (10 or more days without service)

On the first day up to 106 passengers were on the trains, but for the rest of the first week of operation passenger numbers on each train ranged between 12 and 48, with the earlier trains generally more popular than the later. On the first Saturday, passengers were standing and others were unable to join at Huntly. Average daily loadings in the first seven weeks were 153, 118, 222, 287, 123, 130 and 149. On 9 July 2021 it was announced that the Saturday service would from then on run to Strand Saturday services were still close to seated capacity in July, when extension to Strand allowed capacity to be doubled. After another lockdown, trains ran from 24 January to 28 February 2022 with an average of 83 passengers on weekdays and 60 on Saturdays. Te Huia has suffered from a decline, like other public transport, due to COVID-19. Late running was also a problem in early 2022, with 47 trains on-time and 32 late, due to speed restrictions, heat speed restrictions and delays in track tamping work. Although schedules have been eased, they are sometimes not sufficient. Due largely to Cyclone Hale and Cyclone Gabrielle, 11% of trains were more than 15 minutes late in January 2023, but, even without the bad weather, 3 to 5% of trains were that late for most of 2022.

The new schedule and extension to the Strand, from 24 January 2022, increased patronage significantly, with record numbers in April 2022, an average of 265 passengers a day—an average of 240 passengers on weekdays and 353 on Saturdays.

== Operation ==
On 11 July 2023, Te Huia was banned from entering the Auckland metro area by Waka Kotahi after two signal passed at danger (SPAD) incidents (one each in Penrose and Hamilton), forcing the service to terminate at Papakura. Waka Kotahi requires that the locomotives be fitted with European Train Control System (ETCS) to operate in the area. Full service from Hamilton to Auckland Strand resumed on 6 August 2023, with one week of free promotional fares. 60 to 80% of services arrive on time (or within 5 minutes).

On 17 May 2024, Waka Kotahi New Zealand Transport Agency announced that it would reduce funding for the Te Huia service from 75% to 60%, commencing 1 July 2024.

On 10 February 2025, Te Huia ceased stopping at Papakura, and began stopping at Pukekohe.

From 27 July 2025, the rail service began a seven days a week service. A single return Sunday service was introduced. It departs Hamilton's Frankton Station at 2.45 pm and arrives in Auckland's Strand Station at 5.17 pm. The return journey leaves Auckland at 6.15 pm and arrives in Hamilton by 8.37 pm.

The Auckland Transport Alignment Project, ATAP, 2018–2028 plan provided for Pukekohe electrification, a third line from Westfield to Wiri and further new electric trains, part of up to $205m a year proposed by government for "transitional rail" spending, which allowed for the possibility of a Hamilton service.

On 3 February 2025, the line to Pukekohe was electrified.

In 2025 negotiations with the Waikato Regional Council were expected to result in Te Huia stopping at Pukekohe, and with a 42% increase in use of the Saturday service there were plans to add a Sunday service. Te Huia’s average 2024 fourth quarter weekday numbers were up 9% over 2023; and total passenger numbers were up 16%, from 17,361 to 20,089 over the period.

A 2023 Waikato District Council's business case proposed opening stations at Pokeno and Tuakau in the short term, with Te Kauwhata in the medium term. All three towns previously had stations: the Tuakau Railway Station, Pokeno Railway Station and Te Kauwhata Railway Station.

== Rapid Rail ==
The Sixth Labour Government of New Zealand initiated investigation of improved services offering higher speeds over the route, but did not approve any of the proposals.

In 2019, the New Zealand government approved a review into upgrading the rail line to accommodate a maximum speed of 160 km/h, which would halve the journey times between Auckland and Hamilton. Also in 2019, a group made up of local councils and the Ministry of Transport issued a 'Shared Statement of Spatial Intent'. It envisaged that suburban electric services would extend to Pokeno within 10 years and that, beyond that, the whole route would be electrified and faster alignments be created via the Bombay Hills, around the Whangamarino wetland and east of Huntly. It also suggested a spur to Hamilton Airport.

On opening day in 2021, Waikato Regional Council chair, Russ Rimmington said, "Te Huia is only the start of big things, as opportunities are investigated to expand the service and make it faster." Around $98 million is being spent by national and regional government, over 5 years, to collect data and help with planning the next steps. However, criticism has been made of the slow journey and paucity of intermediate stops. An indicative timetable published in 2018 showed 1h 26m, but the 2021 timetable allowed 1h 39m; the first train arrived 4 minutes early at Papakura, yet a car, leaving Hamilton at the same time, arrived at Britomart 35 minutes earlier than the train connection. The only competing public transport service is by InterCity bus. Bus schedules vary between 1h 35m and 2h 30m. The 2023 Te Huia timetable shows 2h 40m. Car travel can be as little as 1h 20m, though, due to congestion, 15% of peak hour car journeys exceed 2h 50m.

An interim business case released by the minister (Phil Twyford) in August 2020 said that "Rapid Rail" could cost between $2.2 billion and $14.4 billion, and said there was a strong case for further investigation. Electrifying the present rail corridor would cost an estimated $2.157 billion with additional operating costs of $725 million, having trains travelling at up to 110 km/h (68 mph) with a travel time between the two centres of 1h 53m. A new standard gauge corridor would cost $14.425 billion; having trains travelling at 250 km/h (160 mph) and taking 69 minutes.

In 2020 the Ministry of Transport noted that slow and unreliable travel between Hamilton and Auckland is, "limiting the opportunity to strengthen economic integration and productivity of the two metropolitan areas. This is evident in: Long and unpredictable travel times due to worsening traffic congestion; Lower than expected demand between Hamilton and Auckland cities due to unpredictable travel times". The Ministry predicts car travel times north of the Bombay Hills will be about 10% slower by 2048, despite motorway widening. The Ministry also found that car dependency put a disproportionate cost on the poor and hampers efforts to cut greenhouse gas emissions and accidents. It concluded that inter-city rail is the only option able to make improvements to all of these. Therefore in July 2020 the Ministry was instructed to develop the next stages for train travel in greater detail, including a possible extension of Hamilton to Auckland rapid rail to Tauranga.

The Ministry suggested that improvements could be made to cut the Hamilton-Auckland journey to 1h 7m, but estimated initially a 1h 22m train journey between Hamilton and Papakura and 32m for an express journey from there to Britomart. There were two intermediate options, with trains travelling at 160 km/h (100 mph) and taking 1h 28m, or at 110 km/h (68 mph) in 1h 41m. Previous options included "Tilt Trains". All four options include a new underground rail station in the Hamilton CBD and all allow 32 minutes for the 35 km (22 mi) between Papakura and Britomart.

== Rolling stock ==
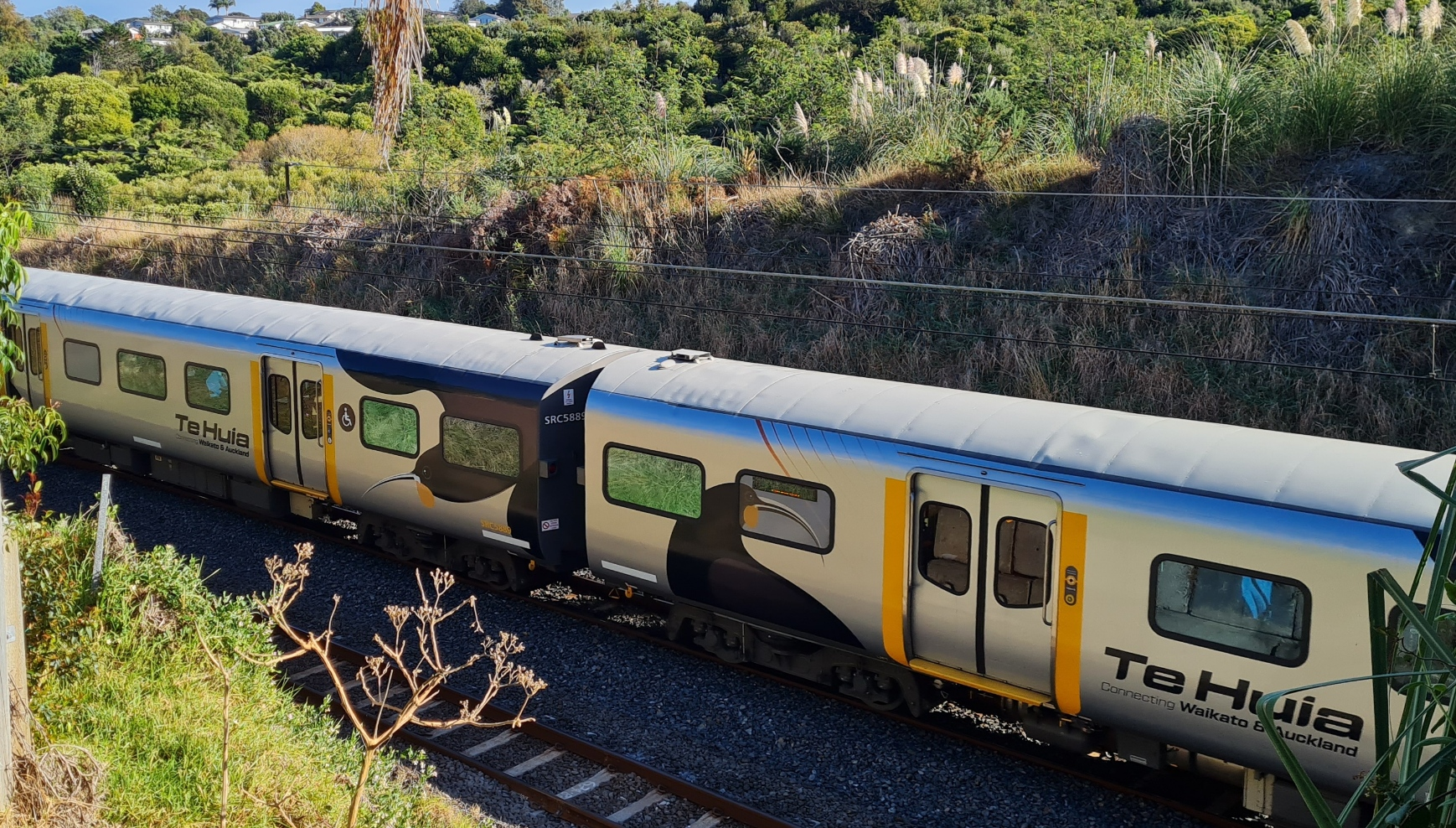
Two southbound SR class carriages in Te Huia's livery at Meadowbank, NIMT, on 7 March 2022

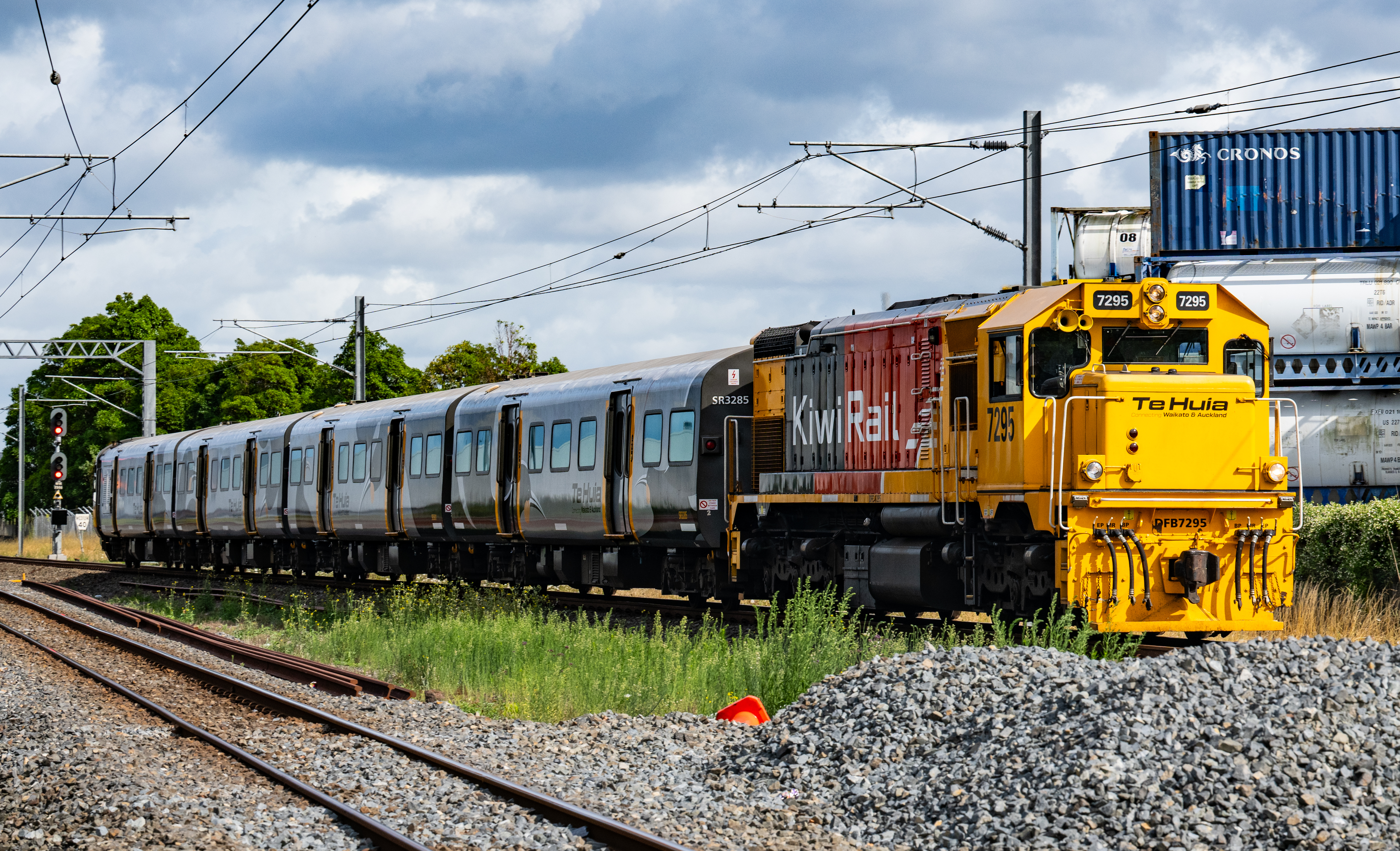
A DF class locomotive hauling SR carriages

Te Huia uses two consists of four refurbished SA and SD carriages, each with capacity for 147 commuters and a café car. The refurbished (by Hutt Workshops) former Auckland Transport SA and SD cars (ten SA and three SD, which became redundant in 2015) have been refitted into KiwiRail SR class.

The two consists have two SR, one SRC and one SRV carriages; with an overall capacity of 300 passengers each way daily. This could increase to two five-carriage consists with a capacity of 400 passengers each way daily. However, KiwiRail's current restrictions limit the train to four carriages when being driven in push-mode from the SRV car. The restriction does not apply when being driven in pull-mode from the locomotive.

The three carriage designs are:

- SR carriage: 50 seats & WC
- SRC carriage: 20 seats & facilities (servery) & accessible (wheel-chair) WC.
- SRV driving carriage: 28 seats & 10 flip-up seats, facility for cycles, generator room, staff office. Driving carriage for use for push/pull operations.

Te Huia sets as delivered from Hutt workshops:

- 1st set: SRV5893, SR5847, SR6061 & SRC5889
- 2nd set: SRV5993, SR3285, SR5801 & SRC3436
- 3rd set: SRV5859, SR5746, SR6015 & SRC5994

The carriages retain the modern metro-style doors from their former Auckland Transport SA and SD class days, which are easier for wheelchair users and cyclists to use, so do not have the wide windows as fitted to the Wairarapa Connection carriages which have traditional "quarter" doors (this slightly reduces the number of seats, but the cost of door conversion was prohibitive). Carriages are painted with a livery consisting largely of gloss grey, with a depiction of the extinct huia bird.

The service uses overhauled DF locomotives (two operating and one spare). The empty trains run to Otahuhu railway station and the Westfield marshalling yard during the day, and will be serviced at a carriage depot at the Rotokauri railway station (Te Rapa) at night.

As the safety case for the SR carriages expires in April 2026, a safety case variation is being put to the rail regulator to use ETCS equipped lead cabs, by replacing DFB class with 3 DL class locomotives, with a passenger conversion to operate with the SR coaches, which will have improved end collision protection. DL Class Locomotives started hauling Te Huia services around August 2026.
