= Kaimai Express =

Passenger train service in New Zealand

Overview
- Service type: Inter-city
- Status: Discontinued
- Locale: North Island, New Zealand
- Predecessor: Taneatua Express
- First service: 9 December 1991
- Last service: 7 October 2001
- Former operator: Tranz Scenic

Route
- Termini: Auckland; Tauranga
- Stops: 7
- Distance travelled: 236.99 kilometres (147.26 mi)
- Average journey time: 3.5 Hour
- Service frequency: Daily return
- Lines used: North Island Main Trunk Line and East Coast Main Trunk Line

Technical
- Rolling stock: NZR RM class (Silver Fern)
- Track gauge: 3 ft 6 in (1,067 mm)

The Kaimai Express long-distance passenger train was operated by Tranz Rail under the Tranz Scenic brand (originally by New Zealand Rail Limited under the InterCity Rail brand) between the North Island cities of Auckland and Tauranga via Hamilton. It used the Silver Fern railcars and operated from Monday 9 December 1991 until Sunday 7 October 2001.

== Background ==
In 1928, when the East Coast Main Trunk Railway was completed to Taneatua, a passenger train commenced operating from Auckland on a slow (12-hour) schedule. Within a year this was upgraded to 10.5 hours and named the Taneatua Express. For much of its life, it ran only twice or thrice weekly.

On 8 February 1959 the express was replaced by a daily railcar service using 88 seater railcars: due to negligible traffic to Taneatua, it terminated at Te Puke. It did not last long, as the circuitous rail route struggled to compete with private cars, being withdrawn from 11 September 1967.

In 1980 Tauranga radio station Radio BoP started running an excursion train from Tauranga to Matamata and Rotorua via the new Kaimai Tunnel under the name Kaimai Express, using NZR locomotives and carriages from Steam Inc and Railway Enthusiasts Society. The excursions were repeated in 1981 and 1982.

== Operation ==
In 1991, the Silver Fern railcars that operated between Wellington and Auckland were replaced by the locomotive-hauled Overlander, and they were transferred to new routes from Auckland, the Geyserland Express to Rotorua and the Kaimai Express to Tauranga. The latter train's name came from the Kaimai Tunnel through the Kaimai Ranges, opened on 12 September 1978. This gave a much faster and more direct route to the Bay of Plenty, substantially faster than the Taneatua Express and 88-seater railcars.

The first Kaimai Express ran on 9 December 1991, a morning service from Tauranga to Auckland and a return afternoon service, taking roughly 3.5 hours in each direction.

In June 2000 timings were changed to enable the introduction of the Waikato Connection morning and evening commuter service between Hamilton and Auckland. The southbound service departed Auckland at 8:20am and reached Tauranga 3 hours 31 minutes later at 11:51am, northbound from Tauranga at 1:05pm to Auckland at 4:34pm, 3 hours 29 minutes later.

Consideration was made at one point by Tranz Rail to extend the service to Mount Maunganui, but this did not eventuate due to the cost of building a platform at Mount Maunganui which would be required.

Whilst the Kaimai Express service had the potential to compete with car and bus services, a lack of marketing and advertising resulted in insufficient patronage for the service to be profitable, and in 2001 it was announced that the service was too uneconomic to continue. No subsidies came forth from the government and no private companies wished to invest in it. It operated for the final time on 7 October 2001.

However, a special one-off tourist style trip of the Kaimai Express, along the current freight train routes between Tauranga and Auckland was performed on 2 May 2026.
