= Taneatua Express =

Express passenger train route

The Taneatua Express was an express passenger train operated by the New Zealand Railways Department that ran between Auckland and Taneatua in the Bay of Plenty, serving centres such as Tauranga and Te Puke. It commenced in 1929 and operated until 1959.

== Introduction ==
The immediate precursor to the Taneatua Express, and a victim of its introduction, was the Thames Express, which operated from Auckland to Thames. The East Coast Main Trunk Railway, in its first incarnation, diverged from the Thames Branch in Paeroa (the Thames Branch later included the line from Morrinsville to Paeroa with the opening of the Kaimai Tunnel deviation), and when it opened in 1928, Thames swiftly declined in status as a railway terminus as services began operating through to the Bay of Plenty. A direct passenger service between Auckland and the Bay of Plenty terminus in Taneatua commenced upon the East Coast Main Trunk's opening, rendering the Thames Express superfluous as the Taneatua service ran all of the Thames Express's route except the final leg between Paeroa and Thames. Accordingly, the Thames Express ceased to operate and the Taneatua train was upgraded to the Taneatua Express.

== Operation ==
When the East Coast Main Trunk opened to Taneatua in 1928, track conditions were not optimal and the train took 12 hours to complete its journey from Auckland to Taneatua. Over the next year, the trackage was upgraded and the Taneatua Express commenced operating. It took 10.5 hours to run between Taneatua and Auckland via a circuitous route. It was nonetheless one of the quicker forms of transport for its era, although the rise of the private car began to impact upon traffic. The proposed direct Paeroa–Pokeno Line from Paeroa to Pokeno on the North Island Main Trunk would have facilitated a faster service; though construction commenced in 1938 and some earthworks constructed, the project was stopped by the outbreak of the Second World War and was never completed. In 1950 the train was speeded up by about an hour, when it ceased serving flag stations east of Paeroa.

The Taneatua Express operated daily, but the economic impacts of the Great Depression and Second World War as well as post-war coal shortages meant that its services were often cut back to operate just twice or thrice weekly in each direction. Motive power was first provided by steam locomotives of the A^{B} class and during the 1940s J class engines took over.

== Replacement ==
By the 1950s, the lack of frequent, daily operation began to prove a significant discouragement to prospective travellers. The Taneatua Express survived to be the second-last steam-hauled provincial express in New Zealand. The final service operated from Taneatua to Auckland on 7 February 1959 and consisted of three passenger carriages and a guard's van hauled by J 1217. A wreath was placed on the front of the locomotive to signify the occasion. The very next day, New Zealand's final steam-hauled provincial express, the Rotorua Express, ceased operating. Both expresses were replaced by railcar services operated by RM class 88 seater railcars, but the Taneatua Express's replacement terminated in Te Puke, permanently ending regular passenger service to destinations beyond that town. The railcar itself did not last long; it was cancelled in 1967, and this was as much due to mechanical problems with the railcars as with patronage numbers on the long and circuitous rail route from Auckland.

Rail passenger services to the Bay of Plenty were not reinstated until the 1991 introduction of the Kaimai Express from Auckland to Tauranga which used Silver Fern railcars running via the more direct new Kaimai tunnel route until the service was discontinued in 2001.
