= Night Limited =

Former express passenger train in New Zealand

Overview
- Service type: Inter-city rail
- Status: Superseded
- Locale: North Island, New Zealand
- First service: 15 December 1924
- Last service: 5 September 1971
- Current operator: New Zealand Railways Department

Route
- Termini: Wellington railway station, Wellington City (1937–1971); Wellington Thorndon station, Wellington City (1924–1937); Auckland railway station, Auckland City
- Distance travelled: 681 km (423 mi)
- Average journey time: 14 hours
- Service frequency: Daily each way

On-board services
- Classes: First and second class
- Seating arrangements: Bench seating
- Sleeping arrangements: Twin-berth cabins (first class only)
- Catering facilities: 10-minute stops at refreshment rooms along route

Technical
- Track gauge: 1,067 mm (3 ft 6 in)

The Night Limited was an express passenger train that operated in New Zealand between Wellington and Auckland, utilising the entire length of the North Island Main Trunk. It commenced service on 15 December 1924 and was replaced by the Silver Star in September 1971 and supplemented by the Northerner express in November 1975.

== Introduction ==
When the North Island Main Trunk railway was completed in 1908, services between Auckland and Wellington were slow and tedious, taking two days to complete the journey. The first expresses ran on 14 February 1909 and took 19 hours 13 minutes, though stopping only at Paekākāriki, Palmerston North, Feilding, Marton, Taihape, Ohakune, Taumarunui, Te Kuiti, and Frankton. The Night Limited was introduced in December 1924 to provide a quicker service. Its name stemmed from the fact it ran overnight and had limited stops at Palmerston North, Marton, Taihape, Ohakune, Taumarunui and Frankton. A^{B} class steam locomotives were employed to haul the service, and this factor combined with the reduced stops allowed the reduction in travel time to just over 14 hours.

== Operation ==
The Night Limited's heyday was in the 1930s, when multiple extra services had to be run at the peak Christmas and Easter holiday periods to cater for the traffic volume. Accommodation on board was primarily seated, although first class sleeping cars were utilised. The sleeping cars had sixteen two-person cabins reached by a corridor along one side of the carriage. Dining cars were never used on the Night Limited as they had been withdrawn as a World War I-era economy measure and not re-introduced to the North Island during the Night Limited's time. Passengers could purchase refreshments at stops along the journey.

Warren Freer became an Auckland Labour member of parliament in 1947, and recalled the Friday night comradeship in a sleeping compartment of the train to Auckland after a week in Parliament, when a bottle of whisky would be produced and incidents in the house or caucus recalled. Freer and Charles Petrie lived near the Otahuhu Station, and Petrie arranged via a sympathetic guard for the driver to slow the train after Middlemore Station so that they could save time by alighting there; the younger Freer first so Petrie could pass their bags to him and then alight; the train then speeded up towards Auckland. In 1949 air travel to Wellington was introduced for backbench MPs.

Motive power in the days of steam was typically the most powerful and efficient locomotives available. A^{B} class locomotives were superseded by members of classes such as the K, and K^{A} and J.

During the 1950s, demand began to significantly decline as competition from aeroplanes and the private car increased. Business travellers increasingly opted for other options, although the schedule was steadily improved to 13.5 hours each way. In the North Island all Limiteds went from steam to diesel power in 1963, and the afternoon expresses in 1964. The change, according to the railway annual report for 1965, "has eliminated smoke nuisance in tunnels and has enabled the journey time to be reduced by approximately 50 minutes". Diesel-electric motive power was typically provided by members of the DA class.

== Replacement ==
The New Zealand Railways Department began investigating the introduction of an upmarket overnight service in 1968 to recapture some of the patronage it had lost. This service, named the Silver Star, was introduced in September 1971 and replaced the Night Limited. An unnamed ordinary express continued to operate nightly between Auckland and Wellington, providing transport for less than the Silver Star's premium fares and stopping at more stations. In November 1975 this express was renovated and re-introduced as the Northerner, withdrawn in November 2004.
