= Rotorua Express =

Passenger express train

The Rotorua Express was a passenger express train operated by the New Zealand Railways Department between Auckland and Rotorua. It operated from 1894 until 1959 and was known as the Rotorua Limited between 1930 and 1937. This train was one of the first expresses in the world to use Pacific (4-6-2) type locomotives.

== Introduction ==
The Rotorua Express was introduced when the Rotorua Branch line was opened through to its Rotorua terminus. The first train to use the new line was an express from Auckland on 8 December 1894 led by two original J class steam locomotives; the trip had taken 8 hours and 40 minutes to reach Rotorua and travelled at an average speed of less than 30 km/h (19 mph). Later in December 1894, a regular express commenced but ran only once a week, departing Rotorua at 9am Monday for Auckland, and returning from Auckland at 9am Tuesday. These trains were typically hauled by members of the J and L classes.

For the winter months of 1895, the Rotorua Express did not operate; passengers had to travel on thrice weekly mixed trains, which were slow freight trains with a passenger carriage attached. The Rotorua Express returned for the peak Christmas, summer, and Easter period and now operated thrice weekly in each direction. This arrangement continued until 1899, when the Rotorua Express began operating every week of the entire year.

== Early twentieth century operation ==
The Rotorua Express has the distinction of being the first express passenger train in the world to be hauled by Pacific locomotives, when Q349 hauled it out of Auckland on Christmas Eve, 1901. This was the start of a worldwide trend, with such trains as the 20th Century Limited, Orient Express, Flying Scotsman and many more all sporting such locomotives of the type in later years. The world's fastest steam locomotive, is also of the same type.

In October 1902, the Rotorua Express became a daily service, taking 7.5 hours on the run to Auckland and nearly eight in the opposite direction. Locomotives used on this service were members of the N and Q classes. The express soon became one of the most prestigious in New Zealand when dining cars were introduced in December 1903. Few services in New Zealand have ever run with dining cars; this was the first to be catered by Railways Department staff rather than outside contractors and they lasted for fourteen years. Economic difficulties imposed by World War I meant that the dining cars were withdrawn in 1917 and never returned; instead, an extended stop was made at Frankton to allow passengers to purchase a meal.

By 1917, the service ran to a schedule of seven hours and motive power was provided by the A class, but a few months after the removal of the dining cars, manpower shortages caused by the War led to the Rotorua Express being combined with the Thames Express for the run between Auckland and Morrinsville, where they were split to run to their separate termini. This combined service required 7 hours and 40 minutes to reach Rotorua, in part due to the shunting required in Morrinsville. A severe coal shortage in June 1919 led to the service being cancelled altogether for six months, with the only passenger option a 12-hour-long journey by mixed train. When the Express returned in December 1919, it reverted to operating independently of the Thames Express.

== Heyday ==
The A^{B} class locomotives were introduced to the Rotorua Express in 1925, and the superiority of these locomotives over prior ones as well as the raising of the speed limit to 80 km/h (50 mph) meant that the service took just 6 hours 40 minutes to run to Auckland and 10 minutes longer in the opposite direction.

From 5 May 1930, reduced stops (Putāruru, Matamata, Morrinsville, Hamilton, Frankton Junction, Pukekohe, and Newmarket) allowed the schedule to be cut to six hours and the train became known as the Rotorua Limited. As part of its upgrade in status from Express to Limited, it became the first passenger train in New Zealand to use the new 50-foot carriages with steel panelling and enclosed vestibules. Two observation cars with lounge chairs were trialled on the service at this time, but they did not prove successful due to the economic climate created by the Great Depression and were converted into ordinary carriages.

The service was involved in an accident with a car on 25 October 1933, which killed police constable James Shields, a passenger in a police car at a rail crossing near Huntly.

In November 1937, the service lost its Limited status and reverted to being the Rotorua Express, but its popularity surged. The conditions imposed by World War II meant that the volume of passengers surged to record numbers. The trains as a result became heavier, so the A^{B} locomotives were accordingly replaced by the newer, more powerful locomotives of the K and then J classes, followed by the J^{A} class in the 1950s.

== Demise ==
Despite the heavy demand for services, the Railways Department cut the Rotorua Express to run just thrice weekly each way in January 1944 because of coal shortages. This harmed demand, and when additional economic difficulties led to the service being further reduced to just twice weekly in 1951, patronage plummeted in favour of the more regular bus service operated by the New Zealand Railways Road Services.Nonetheless, the Express continued to operate almost until the end of the 1950s, when only 6,342 tickets were sold in Rotorua, in contrast to 35,554 in 1929. The Express's final run was on 6 February 1959 when a Friday service operated to Auckland. Three days later, a replacement railcar service began, utilising 88 seater railcars. The railcars ran every day except Sunday and completed the journey in 5 hours 10 minutes, but the 88 seaters were plagued by mechanical problems and last ran on 11 November 1968. As a replacement train was considered to be an unprofitable option, the NZR Road Services buses took over all passenger traffic. It was not until 1991 that a regular passenger train service returned to Rotorua, when the Geyserland Express commenced operating.

== Notes and references ==
=== References ===
- Churchman, Geoffrey B; Hurst, Tony (2001) [1990, 1991]. The Railways of New Zealand: A Journey through History (Second ed.). Transpress New Zealand. ISBN 0-908876-20-3.
