= The Strand Station =

Railway station in New Zealand

The Strand
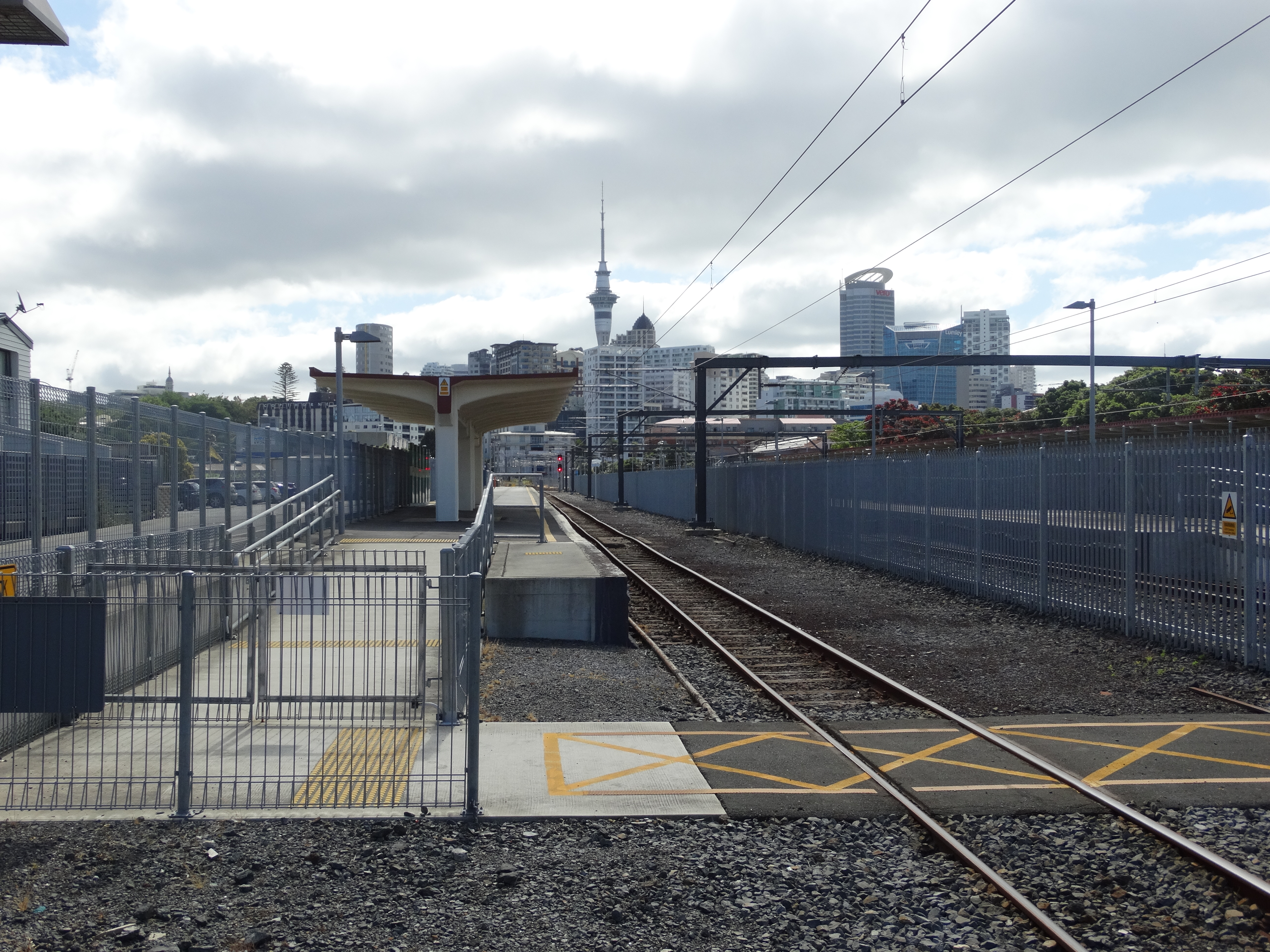
- The Strand Station and stabling facility

General information
- Location: Auckland; New Zealand
- Coordinates: 36.848648°S 174.779542°E
- Owner: KiwiRail (track and platforms); Auckland Transport (buildings)
- Lines: North Island Main Trunk; Newmarket Line
- Platforms: Side platforms (P1 & P2)
- Tracks: 2

Construction
- Parking: Yes
- Cycle facilities: No
- Accessible: Yes

Other information
- Station code: AKD
- Fare zone: City

History
- Opened: 24 November 1930
- Closed: 7 July 2003
- Rebuilt: August 2011
- Electrified: 2014

Services
Preceding station	KiwiRail	Following station
Terminus	Te Huia	Puhinui towards Hamilton (Frankton)
Preceding station	Great Journeys New Zealand	Following station
Terminus	Northern Explorer	Papakura towards Wellington
Route map
Location

The Strand Station, also referred to as Auckland Strand Station (formerly part of Auckland railway station), is a railway station located on the eastern edge of the Auckland CBD in New Zealand. It serves as the long-distance railway station for Auckland. It is the northern terminus of the Northern Explorer service between Auckland and Wellington, and the northern terminus for the Te Huia service between Auckland and Hamilton. Suburban services are not scheduled to pass through the station, however, it serves as a backup for Waitematā during times of disruption or closures.

The platforms were formerly part of the Auckland Railway Station complex which was opened on 24 November 1930 on Beach Road, replacing the previous railway terminus which was on the Queen Street site where Britomart now stands. The 1930 station was the third to serve as the rail terminus for Auckland, and remained the sole station serving the CBD until its closure on 7 July 2003, when Britomart became the new terminus. The original Platform 7 (now referred to as Platform 1) was retained for limited use as 'The Strand Station', named after the adjacent street. It continued to be used by a limited number of peak-hour suburban trains for a few months following the opening of Britomart. After this, the sole used platform served as a limited-use station for excursions and charters, though it and the other abandoned platforms fell into a state of disrepair. In August 2011, the original Platform 7 and Platform 6 (now referred to as Platform 2) were redeveloped and officially reopened for potential use during Rugby World Cup 2011, although they were never used for that purpose.

== History ==
=== Refurbishment ===
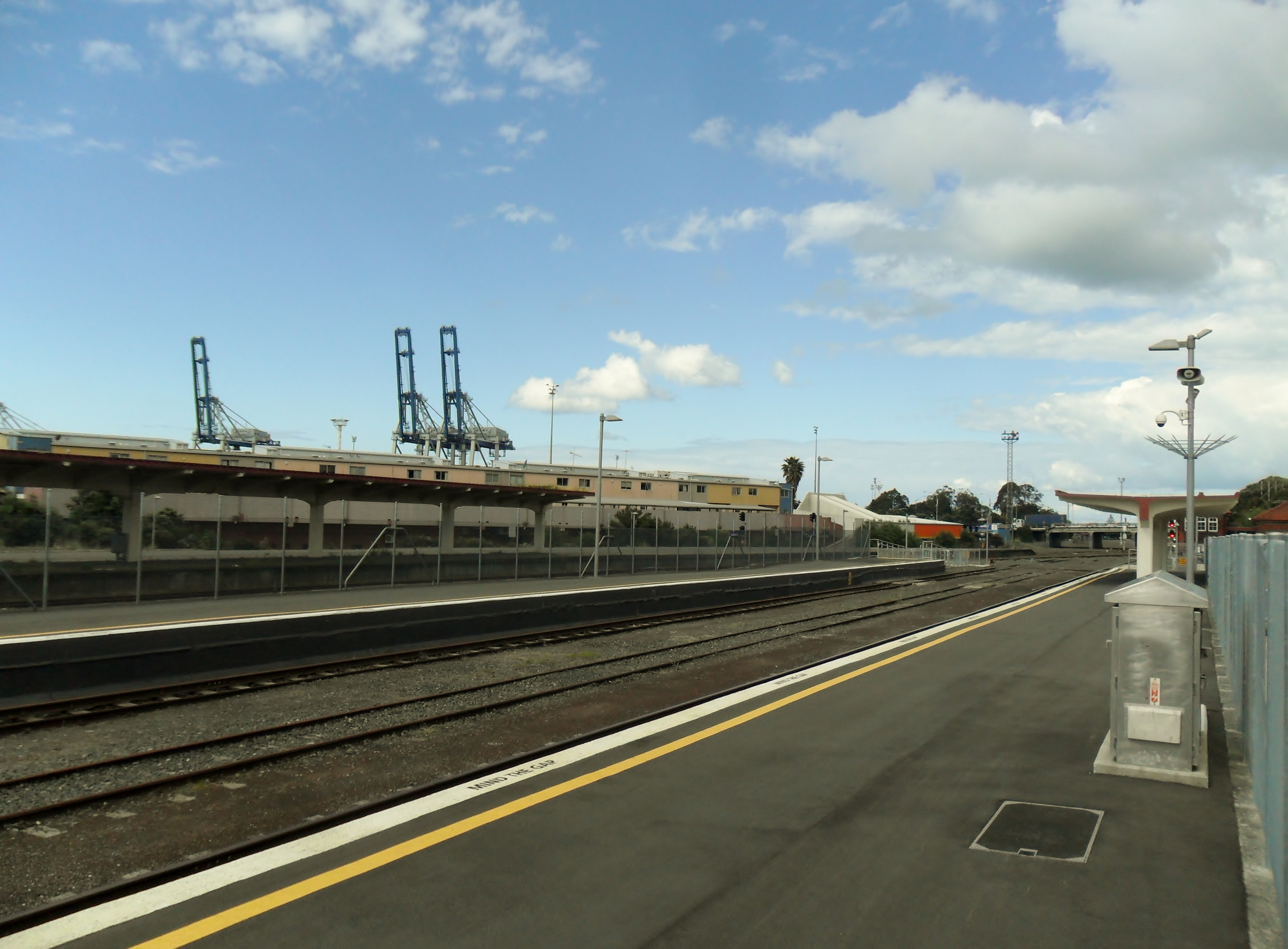
The Strand Station prior to electrification.

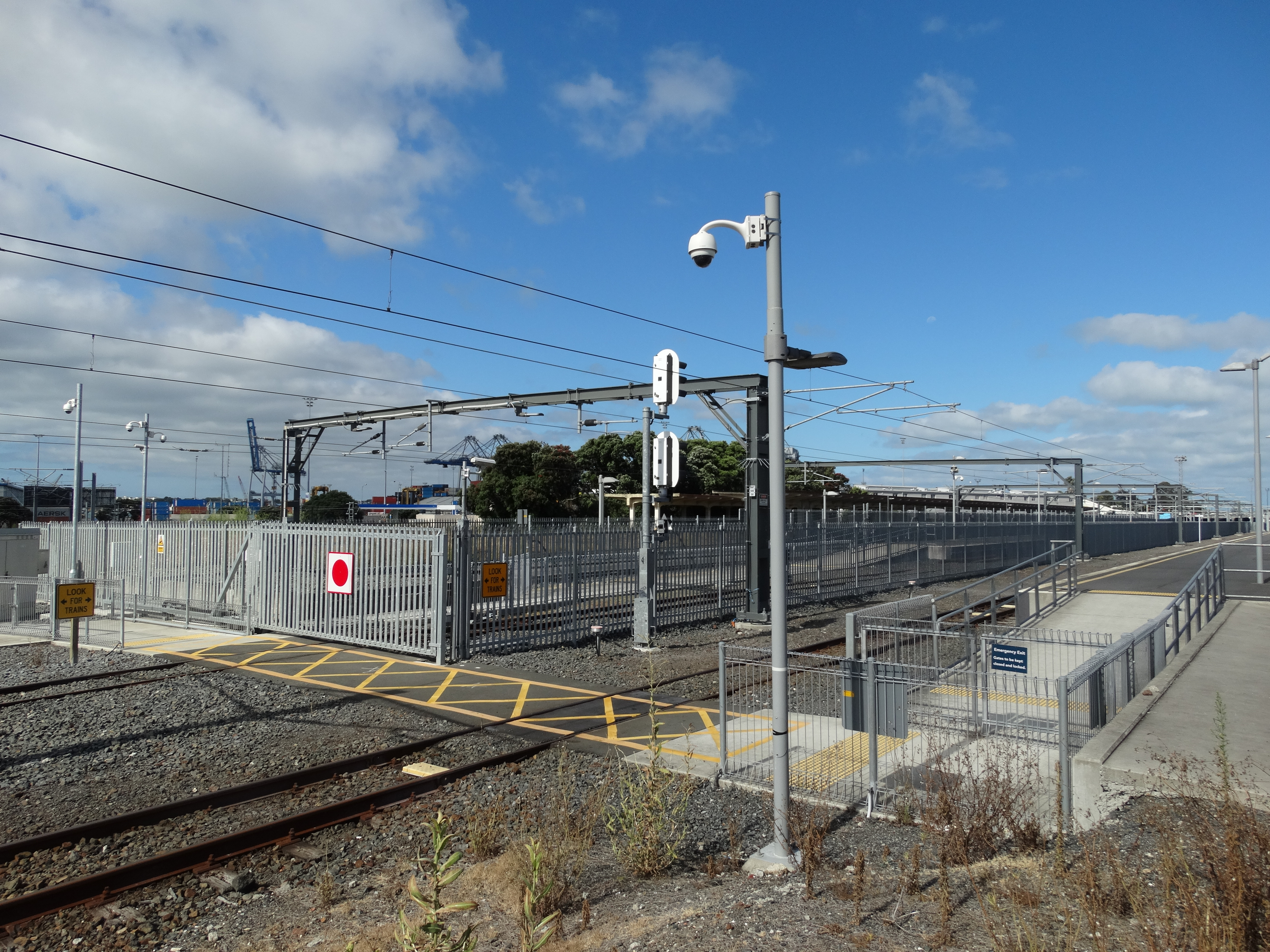
The Strand Station following electrification

Between 2003 and 2011, the platforms had deteriorated into a decrepit state. All of the platforms had been shortened for the Britomart Curve, sections of removed track were stacked up on top of each other adjacent to the platforms, and grass and weeds covered most of the site.

In 2011, two platforms were upgraded by Auckland Transport to prepare them for use as an alternative to Britomart for the 2011 Rugby World Cup. In a $1.7 million project, the canopies were removed from two platforms, with a small section left behind for historic purposes, and the canopies on the other platforms were also left standing due to their heritage value. The platforms were resurfaced, and amenities such as lighting and a public address system were installed. The platforms did not end up being used during the 2011 Rugby World Cup, but they continued to serve as a potential backup station for Britomart during disruptions.

During 2013, stabling facilities were constructed in the disused part of the station, to the north of the refurbished platforms. The stabling yard, officially called the Strand Distributed Stabling Facility, is designed to hold trains when they are not in service. In 2014, the station was fully electrified as part of Auckland's railway electrification project. In December 2015, the station became the terminus of Auckland's sole long-distance passenger train service, the Northern Explorer which ran between Auckland and Wellington, following the shift of its Auckland terminus from Britomart. As the Northern Explorer had become the only diesel service still using Britomart, its operator KiwiRail was requested by Auckland Transport to fund an upgrade to the diesel extraction fans at the underground station, but KiwiRail decided it would be more cost-efficient to cease serving Britomart and move the Northern Explorer terminus to The Strand instead.

== Current use ==
The Strand is occasionally used for excursion trains and is also available as a backup station for Britomart in case of disruptions. Since electrification, part of the station has been used as a stabling facility. Platform 8 restaurant occupies the former foyer of the 1930 station.

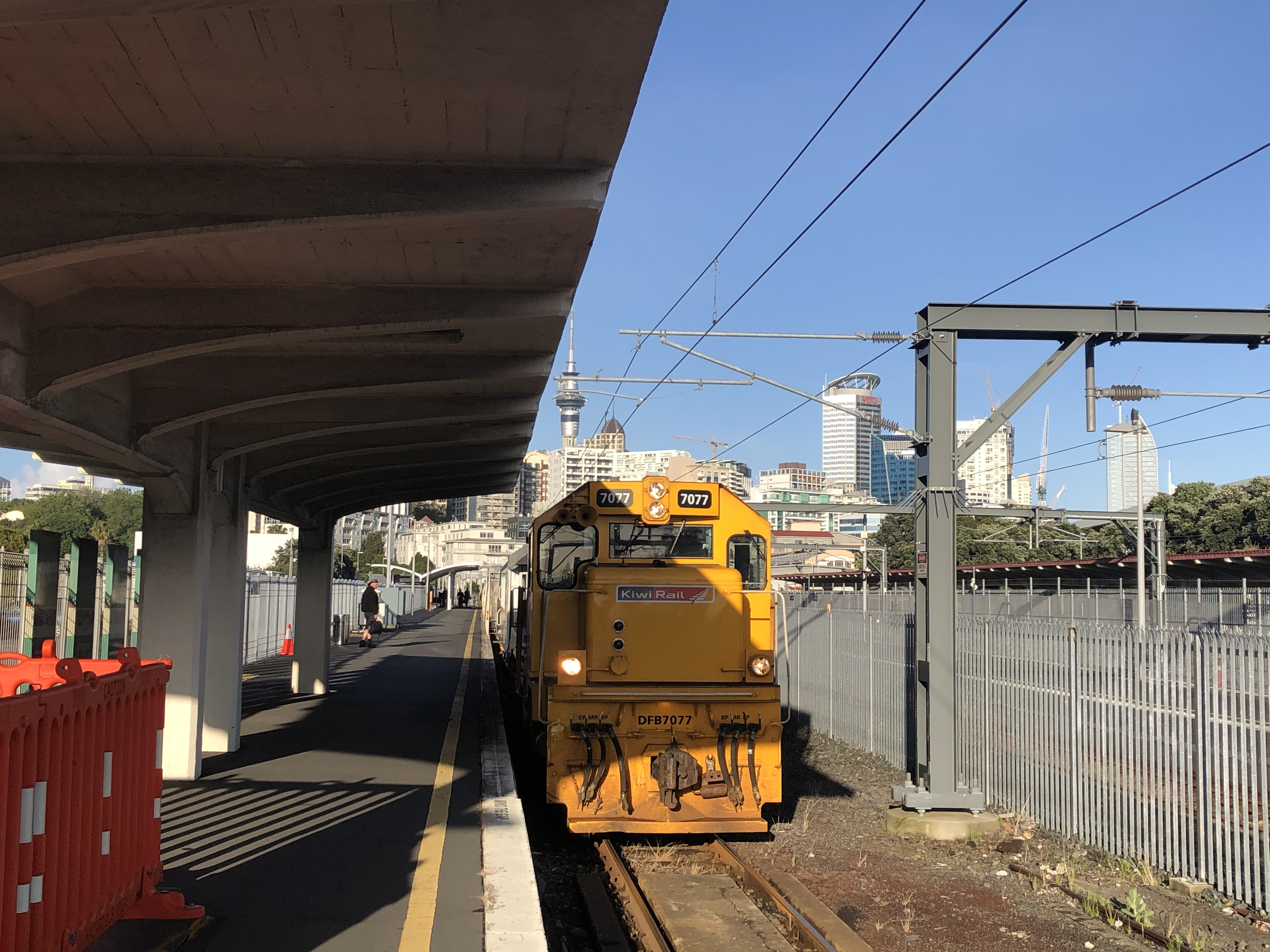
Strand Station, Auckland, in 2019 showing the section of the concrete canopy, which escaped demolition in 2011

Te Huia extends to The Strand on Saturdays from 24 July 2021. It was extended to The Strand on weekdays from 24 January 2022, much earlier than an earlier 2024 proposal, contingent on the Third Main Line project being sufficiently advanced. It may also run on Sundays and public holidays after year 4 or 5; once track access in the Auckland area is not required on Sundays for key rail projects.

== Future ==
Ngāti Whātua Ōrākei, the local iwi who owns much of the land in the area of the station, states on their masterplan for the area the wish for the station to be renamed Te Tōangaroa, the traditional name of Mechanics Bay, the reclaimed bay in which the station is located.

Proposals have also involved or inferred the return of suburban trains to The Strand, though this would entail moving the station further east or building new platforms on the tracks between Quay Park Junction and Britomart. In this case Eastern Line trains would call at The Strand/Te Tōangaroa station.

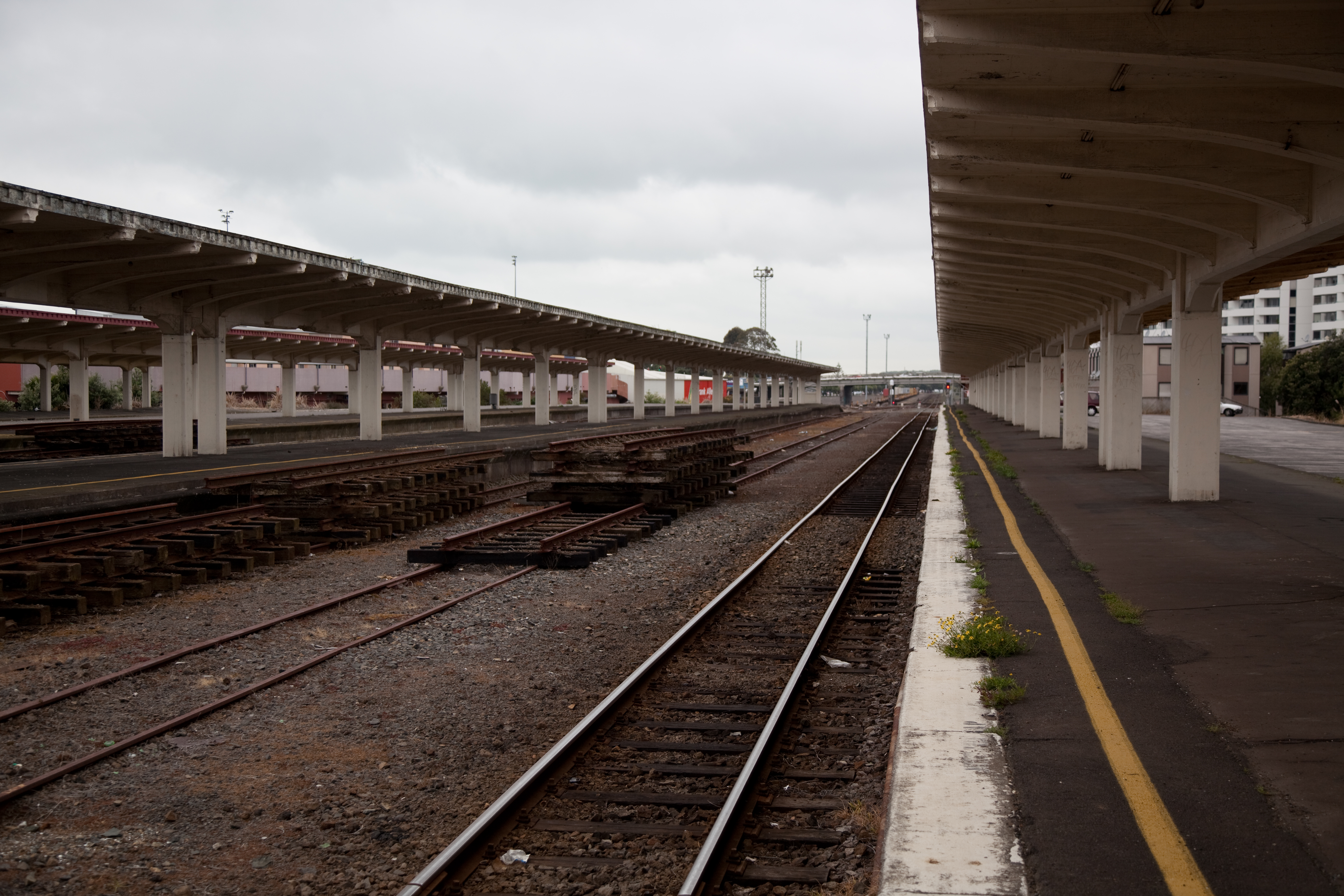
Photo taken from the sole used Strand Station platform prior to refurbishment. To the left are the then disused Auckland Railway Station platforms. The closest platform to the left is now Platform 2 of the Strand. Both Platform 1 & 2 have had the majority of the historic concrete canopies demolished as part of the 2011 refurbishment.

== See also ==
- List of Auckland railway stations
