= Onepu =

Rural locality in Bay of Plenty Region, New Zealand

- Rural locality
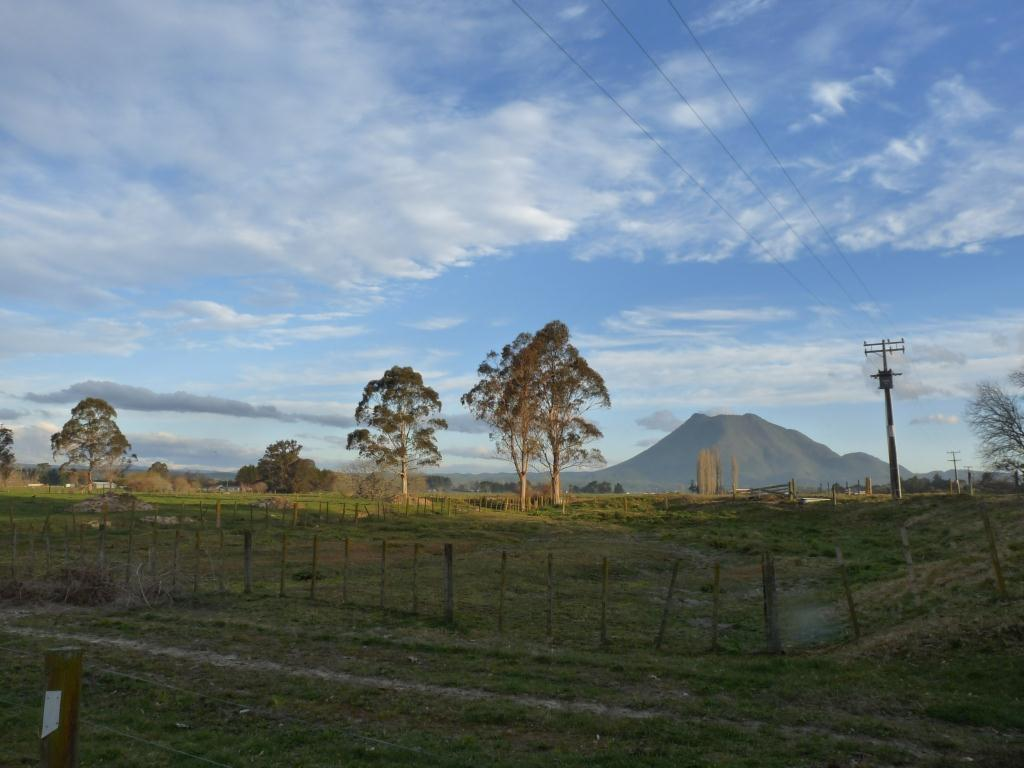
- A farm in Onepu
- Interactive map of Onepu
- Coordinates: 38°02′24″S 176°46′12″E
- Country: New Zealand
- Region: Bay of Plenty
- Territorial authority: Whakatāne District
- Ward: Rangitāiki General Ward
- Community: Rangitāiki Community
- Electorates: East Cape; Waiariki (Māori)

Government
  - Territorial authority: Whakatāne District Council
  - Regional council: Bay of Plenty Regional Council
  - Mayor of Whakatāne: Nándor Tánczos
  - East Cape MP: Dana Kirkpatrick
  - Waiariki MP: Rawiri Waititi

Onepu is a rural community in the Whakatāne District and Bay of Plenty Region of the North Island of New Zealand. Onepu is the original name of the Rohe which the Kawerau township now stands. It is situated between Kawerau and Te Teko along State Highway 34, and lies immediately north-east of the Norske Skog Tasman pulp and paper mill.

The community lies on the East Coast Main Trunk and Murupara Branch railways and is serviced by Rural Delivery route 2. A small airfield was located in Onepu, but it is no longer operational due to the geothermal projects running nearby.

The name "Onepu" comes from local Māori oral traditions. The New Zealand Ministry for Culture and Heritage gives a translation of "loose sandy soil" for Onepū.

Historically, Onepu was also the name of the surrounding district, including the site of the present town of Kawerau.

Onepu is within the rohe (tribal area) of the Ngāti Tūwharetoa iwi. The Hahuru Marae and meeting house, located west of Onepu, is a tribal meeting place for the hapū of Ngāti Peehi, Ngāti Poutomuri and Te Aotahi. It is named after the mother of Tūwharetoa, the eponymous ancestor of the iwi.

== Demographics ==
Onepu Spring statistical area, which includes Onepu, covers 98.95 km^{2} (38.20 sq mi) and had an estimated population of 1,310 as of June 2025, with a population density of 13 people per km^{2}.

Historical population
Year	Pop.	±% p.a.
2006	1,125	—
2013	1,086	−0.50%
2018	1,221	+2.37%
2023	1,293	+1.15%

Onepu Spring had a population of 1,293 in the 2023 New Zealand census, an increase of 72 people (5.9%) since the 2018 census, and an increase of 207 people (19.1%) since the 2013 census. There were 648 males, 645 females, and 3 people of other genders in 423 dwellings. 1.9% of people identified as LGBTIQ+. The median age was 43.2 years (compared with 38.1 years nationally). There were 267 people (20.6%) aged under 15 years, 174 (13.5%) aged 15 to 29, 633 (49.0%) aged 30 to 64, and 219 (16.9%) aged 65 or older.

People could identify as more than one ethnicity. The results were 68.9% European (Pākehā); 44.3% Māori; 3.5% Pasifika; 3.5% Asian; 0.7% Middle Eastern, Latin American and African New Zealanders (MELAA); and 3.2% other, which includes people giving their ethnicity as "New Zealander". English was spoken by 97.2%, Māori by 13.0%, Samoan by 0.2%, and other languages by 4.2%. No language could be spoken by 1.6% (e.g. too young to talk). New Zealand Sign Language was known by 0.2%. The percentage of people born overseas was 12.5, compared with 28.8% nationally.

Religious affiliations were 25.8% Christian, 6.7% Māori religious beliefs, 0.7% New Age, and 1.6% other religions. People who answered that they had no religion were 57.3%, and 8.4% of people did not answer the census question.

Of those at least 15 years old, 153 (14.9%) people had a bachelor's or higher degree, 636 (62.0%) had a post-high school certificate or diploma, and 243 (23.7%) people exclusively held high school qualifications. The median income was $43,200, compared with $41,500 nationally. 144 people (14.0%) earned over $100,000 compared to 12.1% nationally. The employment status of those at least 15 was 549 (53.5%) full-time, 144 (14.0%) part-time, and 60 (5.8%) unemployed.
