= Tāneatua Branch =

Railway line in New Zealand

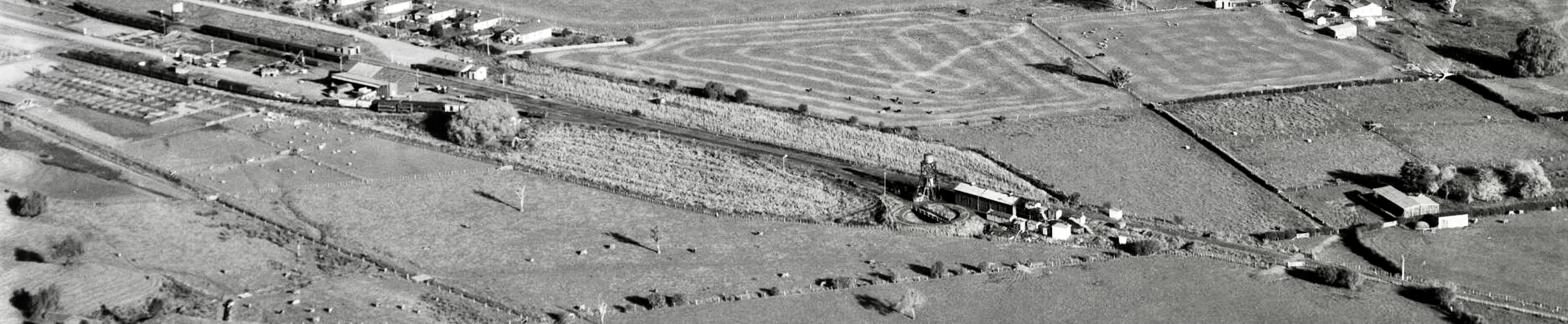
- Tāneatua railway station in 1958

Overview
- Status: Closed
- Owner: New Zealand Railways Corporation
- Termini: Hawkens Junction; Tāneatua

Service
- Rolling stock: None

History
- Opened: 2 September 1928
- Closed: 2003

Technical
- Line length: 25 km (16 mi)
- Number of tracks: Single
- Character: Rural
- Track gauge: 1,067 mm (3 ft 6 in)

Map

The Tāneatua Branch is a 25-kilometre (16 mi) long branch railway line in the Bay of Plenty, New Zealand, running from Hawkens Junction, west of Edgecumbe, to Tāneatua.

== History ==
From 2 September 1928 to 1978 the line was part of the East Coast Main Trunk (ECMT) line from Hamilton. The original intention was for the ECMT to connect to Gisborne via Paeroa, Tauranga, Opotiki and through the Waioeka Gorge, connecting with the Moutohora Branch to Gisborne; creating a link from the isolated Gisborne section line to Auckland via the Bay of Plenty.

This line across the Rangitaiki Plains follows an inland or southerly route to avoid areas which were swampy at the time of construction, therefore bypassing Whakatāne, the largest town in the area. The intention was for the line to be extended from Tāneatua to Opotiki, then onwards east to connect with the isolated Gisborne Section line from Gisborne.

=== Extension to Opotiki and Gisborne ===
Some construction work was carried out beyond Tāneatua towards Opotiki in 1928, and an opening ceremony was held for the new line (the ECMT) in Tauranga on 28 March 1928. When the Minister of Public Works Bob Semple turned the first sod for building the Paeroa–Pokeno Line on 28 January 1938, it was said that the proposed 47 km (29 mi) line would shorten the distance from Auckland to towns on the ECMT by nearly 80 km (50 mi). Work was stopped in July 1928 when the Government of the day transferred the construction workers to the Rotorua-Taupo line which it had just approved the construction of. As late as 1939 £45,000 was provided for extension from Taneatua to Opotiki.

Various routes were investigated and surveyed to link the difficult section between Tāneatua and Moutohora, but all were found to be difficult and expensive. Following the Great Depression, the Second World War and the greater availability of road vehicles in the period after the war, the proposal was dropped and Tāneatua remained the eastern terminus of the railway line in the Bay of Plenty. Gisborne was subsequently linked to the south with Wellington by way of Napier and Palmerston North with the Palmerston North – Gisborne Line in 1942. The isolated Gisborne Section line became the Moutohora Branch line, which closed in 1959.

=== Extension to Whakatane ===
NZR proposed extending the branch to Whakatane from the Whakatane West railway station to a new terminus across the Whakatāne River. The proposal never eventuated.

=== Signalling ===
From when the line opened until the 21 July 1960, the line operated under Open section meaning for a train to enter the section and proceed between two stations, they would need authority from Train control in the form of a Train Advice. On the 21 July 1960, a C.T.C (Centralized Traffic Control) Office was established at Edgecumbe to control train movements from the Awakaponga up departures D8RA-D8RB (slotted control with Tauranga C.T.C),Awakaponga-Awakeri, Awakaponga-Kawerau, Kawerau-Murupara. When C.T.C was in use ststions Awakeri and Edgecumbe were separately interlocked ststion using searchlight signals and motor points. Switchlocks were used to lock sidings as well the dairy siding at Edgecumbe. Local control panels were provided at each end of stations for shunting or train running purposes. The Fletcher Mill road siding at Edgecumbe was protected by a padlocked stop block. The C.T.C machine used was manufactured by Westinghouse Brake And Signal Co; and was in use up until May 1990 when it was taken out of service replaced by Automatic Signalling (A.S) between Awakaponga and Kawerau, and TWC (Track Warrant Control) on the Taneatua and Murupara lines. Edgecumbe and Awakeri became Sidings along with the Bay milk products sidings, with Taneatua being the only actual station. Edgecumbe, dairy co. Siding and Awakeri siding use frame lever points locked with an A.S padlock for points from main to siding/s.

=== Passenger service ===
A passenger service was provided on the line with the Taneatua Express from Auckland between 1928 and 1959. In 1959 railcars replaced this service, but they only operated between Auckland and Te Puke, due to negligible passenger traffic between Te Puke and Tāneatua.

=== Renaming ===
With the opening of the Kaimai tunnel in 1978, the terminus of the East Coast Main Trunk line was changed to Kawerau and the section of line between Hawkens Junction and Tāneatua became the Tāneatua Branch line.

=== Board Mills Line ===
The Whakatane Board Mills Line, a private line, was built and operated by the Whakatane Board Mills (WBM) from Awakeri to their mill in 1937 to serve their large operation. It was proposed that NZR would take over the line once it was completed, but despite several attempts to reach an agreement between the two parties, the line remained in WBM ownership.

This line was privately operated by the mill until 1999 when the then-national rail operator Tranz Rail took over the operation of the line. Tranz Rail discontinued operating the line in 2001. The line was closed in 2003, together with the mothballing of the entire Tāneatua Branch line.

== Today ==
In 2015 a rail cart operation, Awakeri Rail Adventures, was established on the section of the line from Awakeri eastward to Rewatu Road. Some of the track further east was removed in 2017. Tūhoe Charitable Trust built an eco-village on the former Tāneatua railway yard

== See also ==
- East Coast Main Trunk
- Mount Maunganui Branch
- Murupara Branch
- Whakatane Board Mills Line
