= Matahina Tramway =

Bush tramway in the Bay of Plenty, New Zealand

Overview
- Status: Closed
- Owner: Matahina Tramway Limited
- Termini: Edgecumbe; Matahina

Service
- Operator(s): Whakatane Board Mills
- Rolling stock: None

History
- Opened: 1930
- Closed: 1966

Technical
- Line length: 20 km (12 mi)
- Number of tracks: Single
- Character: Bush tramway
- Track gauge: 1,067 mm (3 ft 6 in)

The Matahina Tramway was a bush tramway in the eastern Bay of Plenty region of New Zealand, connecting to the East Coast Main Trunk (ECMT) at Edgecumbe and terminating at Matahina, near Waiohau. It was initially owned by Matahina Tramways Limited, which in turn was part-owned by Matahina Forests Limited and the other users of the tramway. Matahina Forests were the owners of the Whakatane Board Mill (WBM). The tramway operated as an extension of the Whakatane Board Mills Line from Awakeri to the Whakatane Board Mill near Whakatane, until its closure in 1966.

== Construction ==
Construction on the tramway began in 1927, just as the ECMT reached Edgecumbe. The ECMT opened for traffic as far as Taneatua by 1929. The tramway was opened to Matahina in 1930 as a means for sawmillers to access native forests and the Whakatane Board Mill to access plantation forestry. The tramway connected to the Smyth & Co sawmill outside Edgecumbe, the Smith & Bayley Ltd sawmill at Te Teko and Matahina Forests Ltd plantation forest at Matahina.

In 1937, the Whakatane Board Mills Line opened, connecting the recently opened Whakatane Board Mill with the ECMT at Awakeri. Once the exotic forests planted at Matahina had matured in 1943, they directly supplied the board mill. Before this, the mill received logs railed from Tauranga, sourced from Matakana Island. By 1952, the board mill was the only customer using the tramway, and its ownership reverted to Matahina Forests.

== Operation ==
The tramway was worked by bush locomotives - A&G Price CB and E class locomotives for Smyth & Co.'s trams, Smith & Bayley Ltd used a Hudwell Clarke 0-4-2T locomotive. WBM purchased two former NZR engines - F^{A} 41 and F^{A} 250 for their services in 1937. WBM trains ran from Matahina to the ECMT at Edgecumbe directly, where an NZR Guards Van was added, and then on to Awakeri before traversing the board mill line to the mill itself near Whakatane.

WBM paid NZR a access fee for using the ECMT between Edgecumbe and Awakeri.

Following the end of the Second World War in 1945, the New Zealand Forest Service banned steam locomotives from working in the bush. The board mill, which had already begun using a diesel shunting locomotive (also manufactured by A&G Price of Thames) in 1939, purchased a 0-6-0 diesel shunting locomotive in 1949 from Drewry Car Co. to operate on the tramway. A second locomotive followed in 1952. The Drewery locomotives, numbered 103 and 104 by WBM, were similar to the NZR DS class, from the same manufacturer and also introduced from 1949 onwards. Following the introduction of these locomotives, the tramway was relaid with heavier 55lb/yard rails. F^{A} 41 was sold to AFFCO in 1960. The steam locomotives were only used occasionally following the introduction of the Drewery diesel locomotives and could only be used on the board mills line.

== Closure ==
In 1952, New Zealand Government Railways (NZGR or NZR) investigated purchasing and incorporating the tramway into the national railway network as part of a new branch line to Murupara to access maturing exotic plantation forests, as part of the Kaingaroa Forest. NZR's experience with rebuilding the Taupo Totara Timber Company's Mokai Tramway into the Kinleith Branch in the early 1950s dissuaded NZR from progressing the purchase. Instead, the new Murupara Branch, opened in 1955, paralleled the tramway for some distance before the tramway passed under the NZR branch line at Ohui.

The Matahina Tramway closed in July 1966. WBM decided instead of further capital expenditure on the tramway, it would use road transport for logs to the mill, and rail transport for outward products. The tramway was lifted largely by 1967, and by May 1968, only a short section to the Smythes mill near Edgecumbe remained, eventually being lifted sometime later.
