= Tarawera High School =

- old Tarawera High School logo

Location
- River Road; Kawerau 3169; New Zealand; 38°5′13.46″S 176°42′34.07″E

Information
- Funding type: State
- Motto: Te Kaunga Wharangi – The Turning of a New Page New Beginnings
- Opened: 2013 (1955 as Kawerau District High School, 1963 as Kawerau College)
- Ministry of Education Institution no.: 661
- Years offered: 7–13
- Gender: Coeducational
- Enrolment: 452 (July 2026)
- Colours: Blue, Gold
- Slogan: Grow Strive Achieve Serve
- Socio-economic decile: 1B
- Website: tarawera.school.nz

Tarawera High School is a secondary school located in Kawerau, New Zealand. It is the only secondary school serving the town, and serves students from Years 7 to 13. The school was formed as a result of the closure of both Kawerau College and Kawerau Intermediate School, and sits on the Kawerau College site. The school had a roll of 460 as of November 2014.

== Students ==
According to the Ministry of Education, Tarawera High School has a gender composition of 56% male, and 44% female. The major ethnicity at the school is Māori, being 86% of students. This is followed by New Zealand European with 14% of students.

== Closure of Kawerau College and creation ==
Tarawera High School opened at the start of the school year in 2013, formed by merging the former Kawerau College and Kawerau Intermediate.

The school is located on the old Kawerau College site, on River Road, and uses the facilities already there. Helen Tuhoro, who was Deputy Principal of Kawerau College for three years before being Deputy Principal at Trident High School, was appointed as the new principal.

== Re-development ==
In August 2013 Education Minister Hekia Parata, and Associate Education Minister Nikki Kaye, announced a $15.64 million investment in new facilities for the school. The announcement stated that the new facilities would be progressively built, so the school will be able to continue operating during construction. At the end of July 2014, re-development began, with construction set for September. The new facilities will replace 60% of the existing buildings, and will provide a modern teaching space for 525 students with a library, a wharenui, technology and performance spaces, an administration block, and a wireless fibre network. The re-development was said to feature environmentally sustainable initiatives, such as solar heating. Work is expected to be completed by the end of 2015.
