= Whakatane Board Mills line =

Railway line in New Zealand

Overview
- Status: Closed
- Owner: Whakatane Board Mills
- Termini: Awakeri; Whakatane Board Mill at Whakatane

Service
- Operator(s): Whakatane Board Mills then Tranz Rail
- Rolling stock: None

History
- Opened: 1937
- Closed: 2001

Technical
- Line length: 10 km (6.2 mi)
- Number of tracks: Single
- Character: Industrial
- Track gauge: 1,067 mm (3 ft 6 in)

Map

The Whakatane Board Mills line of 10 kilometres (6.2 mi) length was opened in 1937 as a freight-only tramway, and was sometimes referred to as a "private siding". The line closed in 2001.

== Opening ==
The line opened in 1937 as a tramway, connecting to the NZR East Coast Main Trunk at Awakeri. Initially, the line carried materials for constructing the Whakatane Board Mill (WBM), which opened in 1939. WBM was also part-owner of the Matahina Tramway from Edgecumbe to Matahina, to carry logs from the company's plantation forests.

Originally it was proposed New Zealand Government Railways (NZR or NZGR) would take over the line once it was completed, having been built to the same standard as the ECMT to Taneatua with 55lb/yard rail and steel-beam bridges. This never happened despite several attempts by each party to reach an agreement.

== Operation ==
To operate the line and Matahina Tramway, two F^{A} class steam locomotives were purchased from NZR, No 41 in 1937 and No 250 in 1943. The maximum speed on the line was originally 10 miles per hour (16 km/h) then 20 miles per hour (32 km/h) and trains were piloted over level crossings. As the Matahina plantation forests reached maturity, trains began to run to the board mill from the Matahina Tramway, and WBM paid NZR an access fee for the use of its line between Edgecumbe and Awakeri.

Later two Drewry 0-6-0M diesel shunting locomotives built in 1949 and 1950 were used to haul log wagons from the board mill on the western side of the Whakatāne River at Whakatane to the ECMT (later Taneatua Branch) terminal at Awakeri. WBM was acquired by New Zealand Forest Products in 1961, and the locomotives were repainted in NZFP's standard orange and white livery.

The line never had passenger services, but did see an excursion from a then-new Drewery railcar in the mid 1950s, and another by the Railway Enthusiasts Society in 1961.

== Closure ==
The Matahina Tramway closed in 1966, with WBM deciding to use road transport instead to transport logs to the mill and using the line to ship outwards product.

Tranz Rail took over operations from 3 October 1999, and renamed the line the Whakatane industrial siding.

The line was closed on 3 December 2001, and the track was lifted in 2006.

== See also ==
- Matahina Tramway
- East Coast Main Trunk
- Mount Maunganui Branch
- Murupara Branch
- Tāneatua Branch
