= Awakeri =

Locality in Bay of Plenty Region, New Zealand

- Locality
- Interactive map of Awakeri
- Coordinates: 38°00′S 176°54′E
- Country: New Zealand
- Region: Bay of Plenty
- Territorial authority: Whakatāne District
- Ward: Rangitāiki General Ward
- Community: Rangitāiki Community
- Electorates: East Cape; Waiariki (Māori)

Government
  - Territorial authority: Whakatāne District Council
  - Regional council: Bay of Plenty Regional Council
  - Mayor of Whakatāne: Nándor Tánczos
  - East Cape MP: Dana Kirkpatrick
  - Waiariki MP: Rawiri Waititi

Area
  - Total: 7.22 km^{2} (2.79 sq mi)

Population (2023 Census)
  - Total: 300
  - Density: 42/km^{2} (110/sq mi)

Awakeri is a village located southwest of Whakatāne in the Bay of Plenty region of New Zealand's North Island. It is located in a farming and fruit-growing area, has basic amenities and a primary school for students aged 5 to 13, and is best known for nearby hot springs.

Awakeri is located at the junction of State Highways 2 and 30 on the route of SH 2 from Edgecumbe to Tāneatua and the route of SH 30 from Whakatāne to Te Teko, and the two highways run together briefly through the village.

The New Zealand Ministry for Culture and Heritage gives a translation of "ditch" or "trench" for Awakeri.

The Tāneatua Branch railway line also passes through the town, it was disused, however a tourist rail operator has recently leased a section of the branch line from KiwiRail and is opening a rail cart operation. Passenger train services ran through Awakeri and were provided by the Taneatua Express train from 1928 until 7 February 1959, when the steam-hauled carriage train was replaced by an 88-seater railcar service that terminated before Awakeri, in Te Puke. A private railway operated by the CHH Whakatane Mill used to run from Awakeri station to the mill at Whakatāne. The line (now closed and lifted) used to run alongside State Highway 30, including along the front of the petrol station forecourt at Awakeri.

== Demographics ==
Awakeri locality covers 7.22 km^{2} (2.79 sq mi). It is part of the Thornton-Awakeri statistical area.

Historical population for Awakeri and surrounds
Year	Pop.	±% p.a.
2006	267	—
2013	279	+0.63%
2018	291	+0.85%
2023	300	+0.61%

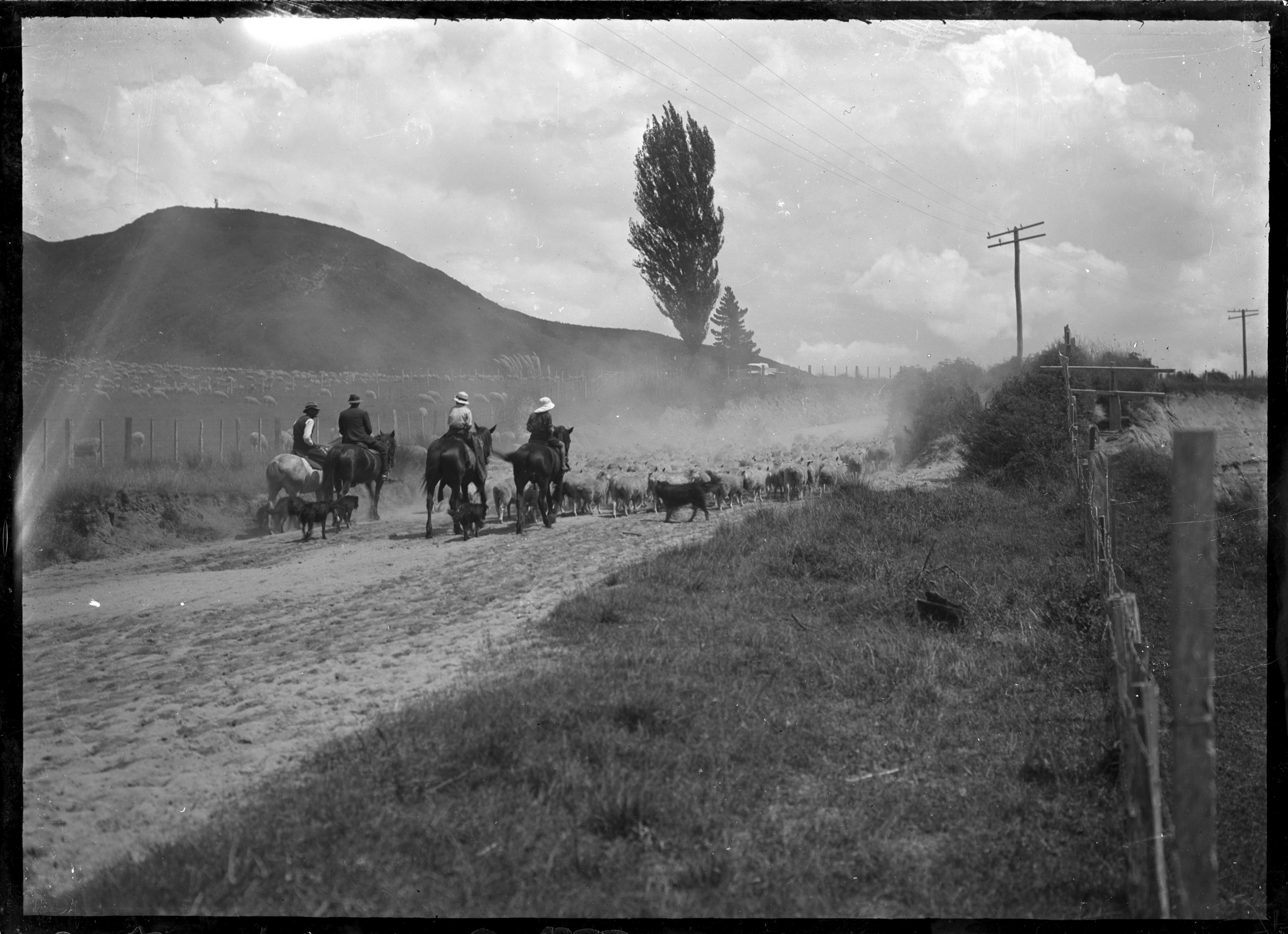
Droving sheep near Awakeri, 1924

Awakeri had a population of 300 in the 2023 New Zealand census, an increase of 9 people (3.1%) since the 2018 census, and an increase of 21 people (7.5%) since the 2013 census. There were 150 males and 147 females in 108 dwellings. 1.0% of people identified as LGBTIQ+. There were 66 people (22.0%) aged under 15 years, 48 (16.0%) aged 15 to 29, 141 (47.0%) aged 30 to 64, and 42 (14.0%) aged 65 or older.

People could identify as more than one ethnicity. The results were 81.0% European (Pākehā), 31.0% Māori, 2.0% Pasifika, 4.0% Asian, and 8.0% other, which includes people giving their ethnicity as "New Zealander". English was spoken by 98.0%, Māori by 8.0%, and other languages by 2.0%. No language could be spoken by 2.0% (e.g. too young to talk). New Zealand Sign Language was known by 1.0%. The percentage of people born overseas was 9.0, compared with 28.8% nationally.

Religious affiliations were 27.0% Christian, 1.0% Hindu, 4.0% Māori religious beliefs, 1.0% Buddhist, and 1.0% other religions. People who answered that they had no religion were 57.0%, and 9.0% of people did not answer the census question.

Of those at least 15 years old, 39 (16.7%) people had a bachelor's or higher degree, 150 (64.1%) had a post-high school certificate or diploma, and 42 (17.9%) people exclusively held high school qualifications. 30 people (12.8%) earned over $100,000 compared to 12.1% nationally. The employment status of those at least 15 was 132 (56.4%) full-time, 39 (16.7%) part-time, and 9 (3.8%) unemployed.

=== Thornton-Awakeri statistical area ===
Thornton-Awakeri statistical area, which also includes Thornton, covers 151.84 km^{2} (58.63 sq mi) and had an estimated population of 2,470 as of June 2025, with a population density of 16 people per km^{2}.

Historical population for Thornton-Awakeri
Year	Pop.	±% p.a.
2006	2,016	—
2013	2,115	+0.69%
2018	2,289	+1.59%
2023	2,364	+0.65%

Thornton-Awakeri had a population of 2,364 in the 2023 New Zealand census, an increase of 75 people (3.3%) since the 2018 census, and an increase of 249 people (11.8%) since the 2013 census. There were 1,176 males, 1,182 females, and 3 people of other genders in 801 dwellings. 1.8% of people identified as LGBTIQ+. The median age was 41.9 years (compared with 38.1 years nationally). There were 468 people (19.8%) aged under 15 years, 384 (16.2%) aged 15 to 29, 1,107 (46.8%) aged 30 to 64, and 405 (17.1%) aged 65 or older.

People could identify as more than one ethnicity. The results were 75.5% European (Pākehā); 39.5% Māori; 2.2% Pasifika; 3.3% Asian; 0.1% Middle Eastern, Latin American and African New Zealanders (MELAA); and 3.2% other, which includes people giving their ethnicity as "New Zealander". English was spoken by 98.0%, Māori by 11.5%, Samoan by 0.1%, and other languages by 3.4%. No language could be spoken by 1.8% (e.g. too young to talk). New Zealand Sign Language was known by 0.4%. The percentage of people born overseas was 9.8, compared with 28.8% nationally.

Religious affiliations were 27.5% Christian, 0.1% Hindu, 0.1% Islam, 4.3% Māori religious beliefs, 0.3% Buddhist, 0.4% New Age, and 0.8% other religions. People who answered that they had no religion were 59.3%, and 7.9% of people did not answer the census question.

Of those at least 15 years old, 300 (15.8%) people had a bachelor's or higher degree, 1,167 (61.6%) had a post-high school certificate or diploma, and 432 (22.8%) people exclusively held high school qualifications. The median income was $40,800, compared with $41,500 nationally. 234 people (12.3%) earned over $100,000 compared to 12.1% nationally. The employment status of those at least 15 was 975 (51.4%) full-time, 315 (16.6%) part-time, and 57 (3.0%) unemployed.

== Sports ==
The Awakeri Football Club is based at the school, with football the dominant sport.

== Education ==
Awakeri School is a co-educational state primary school for Year 1 to 8 students, with a roll of 335 as of July 2026. It opened in 1913 as Otarere School, and was renamed Awakeri School in 1917. It was destroyed by fire in 1933, and rebuilt.
