= Mount Maunganui Branch =

Overview
- Status: Open
- Owner: KiwiRail
- Locale: Tauranga
- Termini: Mount Maunganui junction, East Coast Main Trunk Railway.; Port of Tauranga

Service
- Type: Industrial
- Operator: KiwiRail

Technical
- Line length: 6.50 km (4.04 mi)
- Num of tracks: Single
- Character: Industrial
- Track gauge: 1,067 mm (3 ft 6 in)

The Mount Maunganui branch is a short industrial branch line in Tauranga, New Zealand, servicing the eastern side of the Port of Tauranga. It branches from the East Coast Main Trunk at a triangle junction outside Baypark Stadium before running north-west through Mount Maunganui to the port complex.

A number of services use the branch daily. Its primary traffic is bulk products - export timber and some timber products from local forests and the Kinlieth and Tasman mills; and coal destined for the Huntly power station and the New Zealand Steel mill at Glenbrook. It is also used for shunts to and from the container handling facilities of the Port of Tauranga, which are located at Sulphur Point on the other side of Tauranga Harbour. With 21 freight trains per day the line was estimated (1990) as the fifth busiest line in New Zealand.

== History ==
By 1910 the Mount Maunganui wharf was used by the Public Works Department (PWD) with workshops for railway construction material in the area, so was not handed over to the NZR until 1924. With the Great Depression the PWD workshop was closed about 1930, and the branch had no regular traffic from 1934. In 1942 because of a shortage of track material the track was lifted and relaid to the nearby RNZAF base (now Tauranga Airport).

With the establishment of the Kawerau Branch the port was to be used for exporting paper and timber. The line was relaid with heavy rails and reopened on 28 March 1955. In the 1950s a large marshalling yard was built at Mount Maunganui and extended in the 1960s and 1970s. A new marshalling yard had been built at Te Maunga the junction with the East Coast Main Trunk (ECMT), but more recently most trains run into Mount Maunganui and the line is operated as part of the ECMT. The Frankton Junction picnic train for Railways staff from Hamilton to Mount Maunganui used to be a very significant event.

In the 1970s and 1980s there was consideration to a combined road and rail bridge across the Tauranga Harbour to shorten the distance from Tauranga to the port, but as a low-level bridge would affect shipping a high-level bridge was built; the steep approach grades precluded its use by rail. There was local pressure in the 1970s to reroute the branch line, and before the 1972 general election Sir Basil Arthur the Labour spokesman on transport had promised to reroute the line if Labour was elected. But the deviation did not proceed. It would have cost $3 million (1974), with extra operating costs of $3000 per year. The new route would have required sharp curves and a level crossing.

In 2016, the junction with the East Coast Main Trunk was relocated westward and the line diverted west of Owens Place. The diversion was to allow room for State Highway 2 to be widened and grade separated between Bayfair and Baypark.

== See also ==
- East Coast Main Trunk
- Murupara Branch
- Tāneatua Branch
- Whakatane Board Mills Line
