= Edgecumbe College =

Secondary school in New Zealand

Location
- College Road; Edgecumbe 3120; New Zealand; 37°58′3.29″S 176°49′37.92″E

Information
- Funding type: State
- Motto: Learners Today – Leaders Tomorrow
- Opened: 1962
- Ministry of Education Institution no.: 145
- Principal: Peter Leggat (acting)
- Years offered: 9–13
- Gender: Coeducational
- Enrolment: 129 (July 2026)
- Colours: Red, White, Black
- Socio-economic decile: 3H
- Website: edgecumbecollege.school.nz

Edgecumbe College is a secondary school located in Edgecumbe, New Zealand, and is the only secondary school in the town. It serves students from Year 9 to Year 13, and had a roll of 213 as of late 2014.

== Enrolment ==
As of July 2026, Edgecumbe College has roll of 129 students, of which 85 (65.9%) identify as Māori.

As of 2026, the school has an Equity Index of 530, placing it amongst schools whose students have most socioeconomic barriers to achievement (roughly equivalent to deciles 2 and 3 under the former socio-economic decile system).

== Facilities ==
According to the website of the College, the college has a solar heated swimming pool, gymnasium, music suite, library, technology and computer facilities, as well as classrooms and support facilities.
