= Whakatāne =

Town in Bay of Plenty, New Zealand

- Town
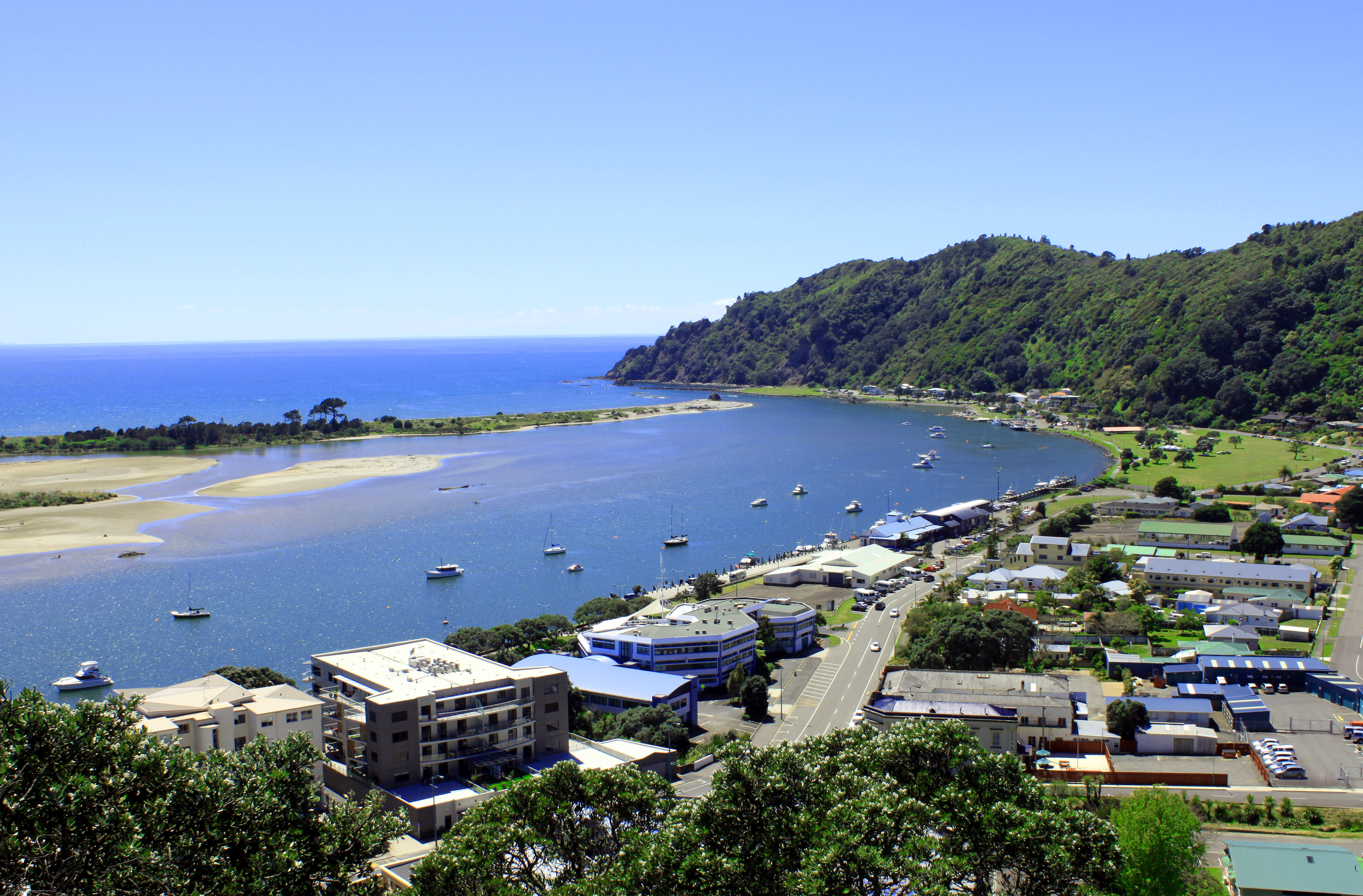
- Motto: Everything under the sun
- Interactive map of Whakatāne
- Coordinates: 37.96°S 176.98°E
- Country: New Zealand
- Region: Bay of Plenty
- Territorial authority: Whakatāne District
- Ward: Whakatāne-Ōhope General Ward
- Community: Whakatāne-Ōhope Community
- Settled by Māori: c. 1200
- Electorates: East Cape; Waiariki (Māori)

Government
  - Territorial authority: Whakatāne District Council
  - Regional council: Bay of Plenty Regional Council
  - Mayor of Whakatāne: Nándor Tánczos
  - East Cape MP: Dana Kirkpatrick
  - Waiariki MP: Rawiri Waititi

Area
  - Urban: 24.41 km^{2} (9.42 sq mi)

Population (June 2025)
  - Urban: 16,950
  - Density: 694.4/km^{2} (1,798/sq mi)
- Time zone: UTC+12 (NZST)
  - Summer (DST): UTC+13 (NZDT)
- Postcode(s): 3120
- Area code: 07
- Website: https://www.whakatane.govt.nz/

Whakatāne (/fɑːkɑːˈtɑːneɪ/ fah-kah-TAH-nay, Māori pronunciation: [ɸakaˈtaːnɛ]) is a town located in the Bay of Plenty Region in the North Island of New Zealand, 90 kilometres (56 mi) east of Tauranga and 89 kilometres (55 mi) northeast of Rotorua. The town is situated at the mouth of the Whakatāne River. The Whakatāne District is the territorial authority that encompasses the town, covering an area to the south and west of the town, excluding the enclave of Kawerau District.

Whakatāne has an urban population of 16,950, making it New Zealand's 33rd-largest urban area and the Bay of Plenty's third-largest urban area, after Tauranga and Rotorua. Another 21,450 people live in the rest of the Whakatāne District. Around 42% of the population identify as having Māori ancestry, and 66% as having European/Pākehā ancestry, compared with 17% and 72% nationally (some people identify with multiple ethnicities).

Whakatāne is part of the parliamentary electorate of East Coast, currently represented by Dana Kirkpatrick of the New Zealand National Party. The town is the main urban centre of the eastern Bay of Plenty sub-region, which includes Whakatāne, Kawerau, and Ōpōtiki, stretching from Otamarakau in the west to Cape Runaway in the northeast and Whirinaki in the south. Whakatāne is also the seat of the Bay of Plenty Regional Council, which was chosen as a compromise between the region's two larger cities, Tauranga and Rotorua.

== History and culture ==
=== Māori occupation ===
The site of the town has long been populated. Māori pā (Māori fortified village) sites in the area date back to the first Polynesian settlements, estimated to have been around 1200 CE. According to Māori tradition Toi-te-huatahi, later known as Toi-kai-rakau, landed at Whakatāne about 1150 CE in search of his grandson Whatonga. Failing to find Whatonga, he settled in the locality and built a pa on the highest point of the headland now called Whakatāne Heads, overlooking the present town. Some 200 years later the Mātaatua waka landed at Whakatāne.

The Maori name Whakatāne is reputed to commemorate an incident occurring after the arrival of the Mataatua. The men had gone ashore and the canoe began to drift. Wairaka, a chieftainess, said "Kia whakatāne au i ahau" ("I will act like a man"), and commenced to paddle – something that women were not allowed to do. With the help of the other women, the canoe was saved. Wairaka's efforts are commemorated by a bronze statue of her at the mouth of the Whakatāne River, which was installed in 1965.

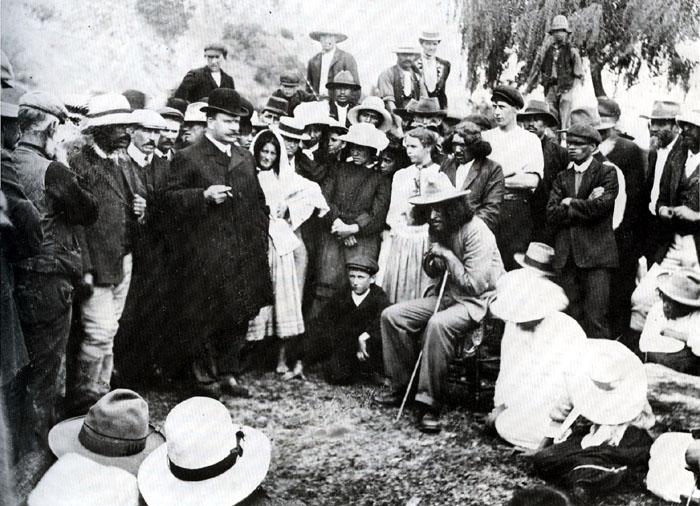
Māori prophet Rua Kenana Hepetipa meets with Prime Minister Joseph Ward in Whakatāne, 1908.

The region around Whakatāne was important during the New Zealand Wars of the mid-19th century, particularly the Völkner incident. Its role culminated in 1869 with raids by Te Kooti's forces and a number of its few buildings were razed, leading to an armed constabulary being stationed above the town for a short while. Whakatāne beach heralded a historic meeting on 23 March 1908 between Prime Minister Joseph Ward and the Māori prophet and activist Rua Kenana Hepetipa. Kenana claimed to be Te Kooti's successor.

=== European settlement ===
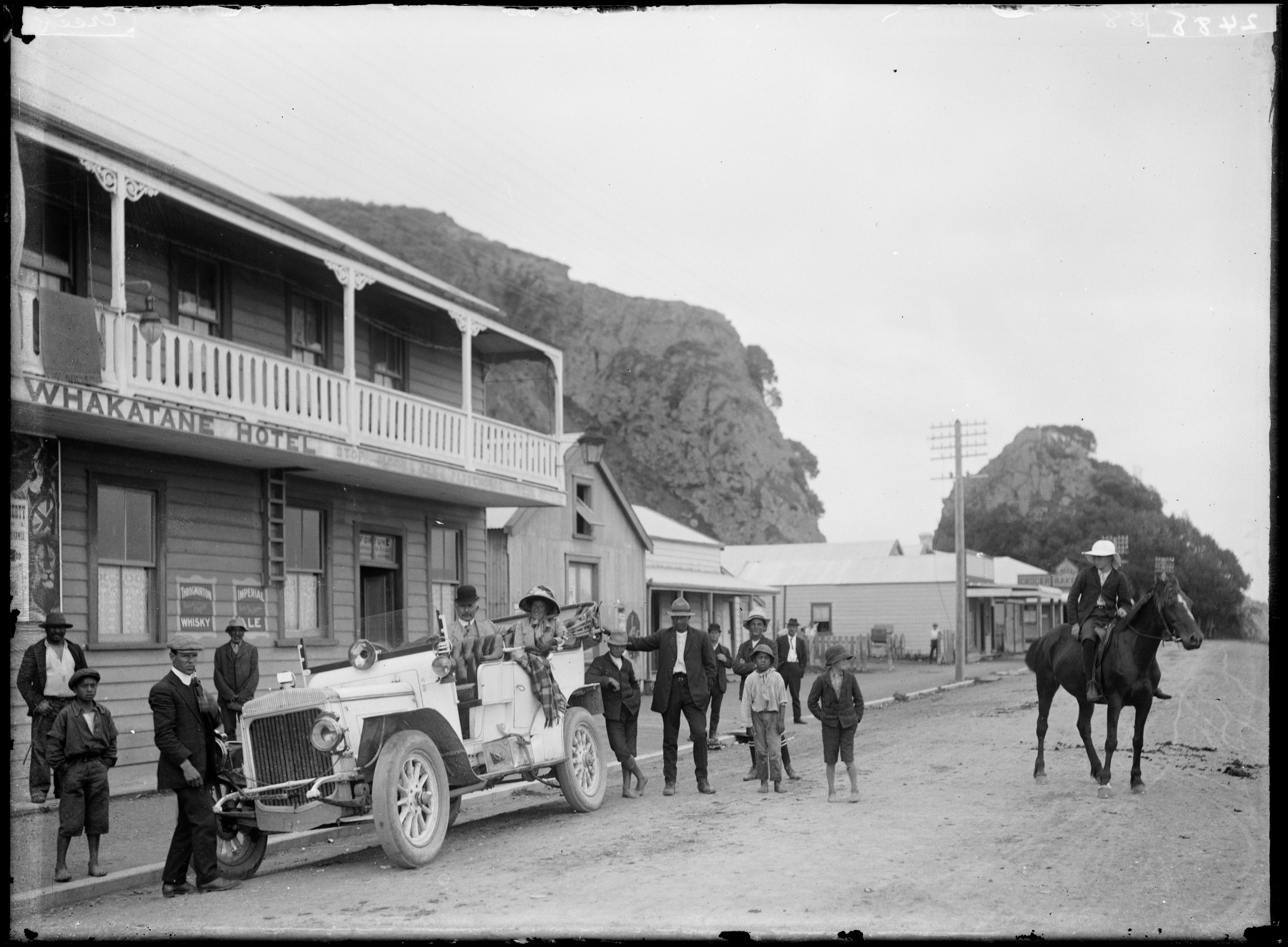
Whakatāne township (ca. 1910s), with the Whakatane Hotel on the left.

The town was a notable shipbuilding and trade centre from 1880 and with the draining of the Rangitāiki swamp into productive farmland from 1904, Whakatāne grew considerably. In the early 1920s, it was the fastest-growing town in the country for a period of about three years and this saw the introduction of electricity for the first time. The carton board mill at Whakatāne began as a small operation in 1939 and continues operating to this day.

The Whakatāne River once had a much longer and more circuitous route along the western edge of the Whakatāne urban area, having been significantly re-coursed in the 1960s with a couple of its loopier loops removed to help prevent flooding and provide for expansion of the town. Remnants of the original watercourse remain as Lake Sullivan and the Awatapu lagoon. The original wide-span ferro-concrete bridge constructed in 1911 at the (aptly named) Bridge Street was demolished in 1984 and replaced by the Landing Road bridge.

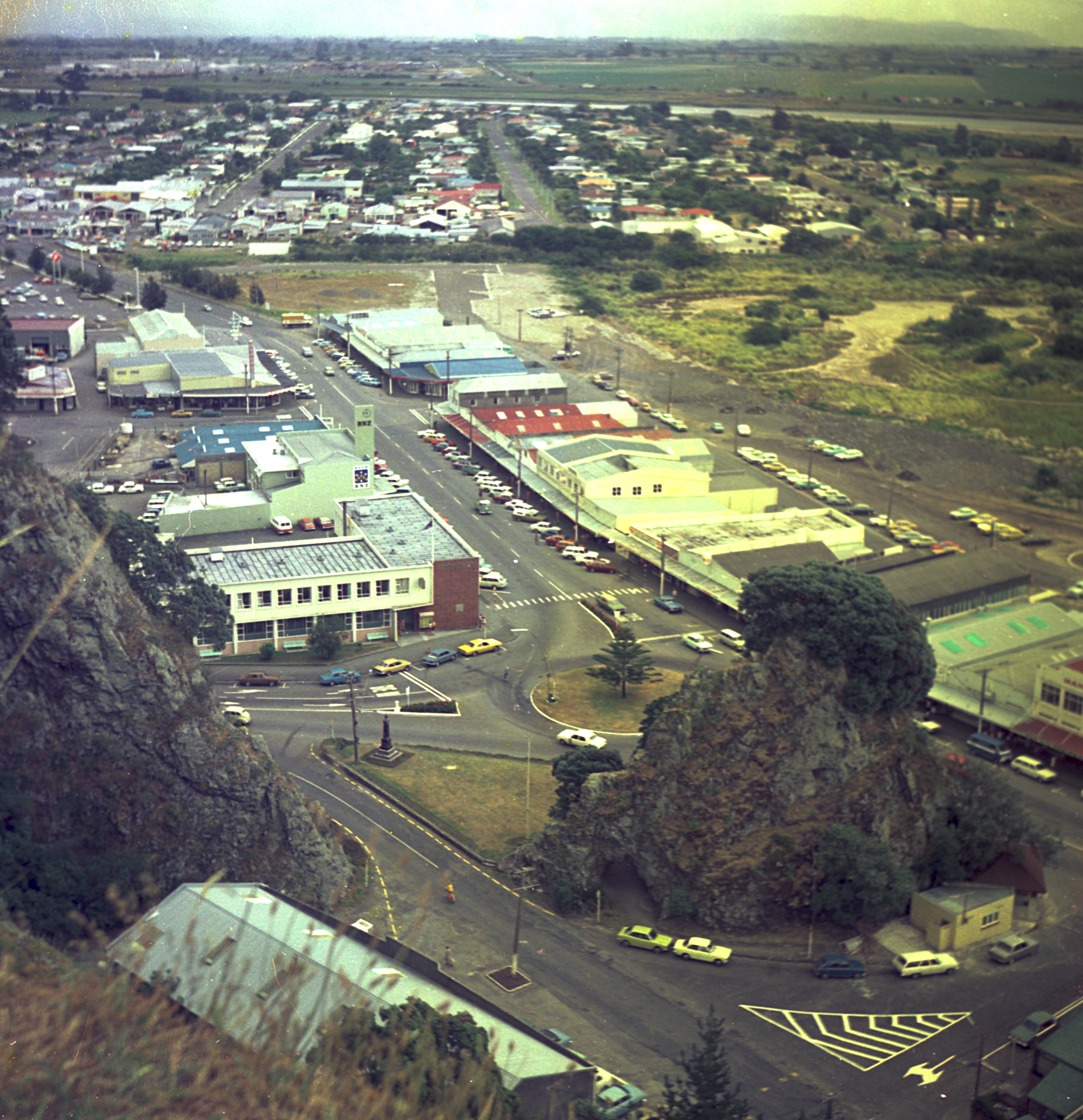
Overlooking Whakatāne and Pohaturoa Rock, 1975

=== Mataatua Declaration ===
The 'First International Conference on the Cultural and Intellectual Property Rights of Indigenous Peoples' was held in Whakatāne from 12 to 18 June 1993. This resulted in the Mataatua Declaration on Cultural and Intellectual Property Rights of Indigenous Peoples', commonly referred to as the Mataatua Declaration.

=== Marae ===
Whakatāne has five marae, which are meeting places for Ngāti Awa hapū:

- Te Hokowhitu a Tū ki te Rāhui Marae and Te Hokowhitu a Tūmatauenga meeting house is affiliated with Ngāti Wharepaia and Ngāti Hokopū – Te Hokowhitu a Tu Ki Te Rāhui.
- Te Rangihouhiri II Marae and Te Rangihouhiri II meeting house is affiliated with Ngāi Te Rangihouhiri II.
- Tokitareke or Warahoe Marae and Te Puna o Te Orohi meeting house is affiliated with Warahoe.
- Toroa or Pupuaruhe Marae and Toroa meeting house is affiliated with Te Patuwai.
- Te Whare o Toroa Marae and Wairaka meeting house is affiliated with Ngāti Wharepaia and Ngāti Hokopū – Te Whare o Toroa.

In October 2020, the Government committed from the Provincial Growth Fund to upgrading Te Hokowhitu a Tū ki te Rāhui Marae and 11 other Ngāti Awa marae, creating 23 jobs. It also committed $282,275 to upgrade Te Whare o Toroa Marae, creating an estimated 21 jobs.

== Demographics ==
Whakatāne urban area covers 24.41 km^{2} (9.42 sq mi) and had an estimated population of 16,950 as of June 2025, with a population density of 694 people per km^{2}.

Historical population
Year	Pop.	±% p.a.
2006	14,697	—
2013	14,388	−0.30%
2018	15,795	+1.88%
2023	16,419	+0.78%

Whakatāne had a population of 16,419 in the 2023 New Zealand census, an increase of 624 people (4.0%) since the 2018 census, and an increase of 2,031 people (14.1%) since the 2013 census. There were 7,848 males, 8,532 females, and 39 people of other genders in 6,114 dwellings. 2.0% of people identified as LGBTIQ+. The median age was 40.5 years (compared with 38.1 years nationally). There were 3,399 people (20.7%) aged under 15 years, 2,712 (16.5%) aged 15 to 29, 6,786 (41.3%) aged 30 to 64, and 3,522 (21.5%) aged 65 or older.

People could identify as more than one ethnicity. The results were 65.7% European (Pākehā); 43.3% Māori; 4.2% Pasifika; 6.6% Asian; 0.6% Middle Eastern, Latin American and African New Zealanders (MELAA); and 2.2% other, which includes people giving their ethnicity as "New Zealander". English was spoken by 96.3%, Māori by 12.7%, Samoan by 0.2%, and other languages by 7.1%. No language could be spoken by 2.2% (e.g. too young to talk). New Zealand Sign Language was known by 0.4%. The percentage of people born overseas was 16.2, compared with 28.8% nationally.

Religious affiliations were 31.8% Christian, 0.7% Hindu, 0.3% Islam, 6.4% Māori religious beliefs, 0.5% Buddhist, 0.4% New Age, and 1.4% other religions. People who answered that they had no religion were 51.6%, and 7.3% of people did not answer the census question.

Of those at least 15 years old, 2,301 (17.7%) people had a bachelor's or higher degree, 7,326 (56.3%) had a post-high school certificate or diploma, and 3,384 (26.0%) people exclusively held high school qualifications. The median income was $34,900, compared with $41,500 nationally. 1,005 people (7.7%) earned over $100,000 compared to 12.1% nationally. The employment status of those at least 15 was 5,736 (44.1%) full-time, 1,866 (14.3%) part-time, and 501 (3.8%) unemployed.

Individual statistical areas
Name	Area (km^{2})	Population	Density (per km^{2})	Dwellings	Median age	Median income
Coastlands	15.28	2,223	145	711	38.7 years	$42,200
Whakatāne West	1.83	3,444	1,882	1,104	32.7 years	$34,900
Whakatāne Central	2.59	3,363	1,298	1,374	45.7 years	$33,800
Trident	1.81	3,417	1,888	1,278	40.1 years	$30,300
Allandale	1.53	2,613	1,708	1,101	42.5 years	$34,200
Mokorua Bush	1.36	1,359	999	546	51.6 years	$44,600
New Zealand					38.1 years	$41,500

== Geography ==
Bush near Whakatāne is renowned for its biodiversity

Moutohora Island is a small island off the Bay of Plenty coast about 12 kilometres (7.5 mi) north of Whakatāne. The island has numerous sites of pā. It also provided shelter for James Cook's Endeavour in 1769. A whaling station existed on the island during the 19th century.

Whakaari/White Island is an active marine volcano located 48 kilometres (25 n.mi.) offshore of Whakatāne and was a popular visitor attraction. Sulphur mining on the island was attempted but abandoned in 1914 after a lahar killed all 10 workers.

The mouth of the Whakatāne River and Ohiwa Harbour have both provided berths for yachts, fishing trawlers and small ships since European settlement of the area. Nearby Ōhope Beach is a sandy beach stretching 11 km (7 mi) from the Ohiwa Harbour entrance.

=== Climate ===
Climate data for Whakatāne (1991–2020 normals, extremes 1947–present)
Month	Jan	Feb	Mar	Apr	May	Jun	Jul	Aug	Sep	Oct	Nov	Dec	Year
Record high °C (°F)	34.4 (93.9)	36.4 (97.5)	31.0 (87.8)	29.6 (85.3)	24.5 (76.1)	21.1 (70.0)	20.0 (68.0)	22.0 (71.6)	24.4 (75.9)	28.2 (82.8)	32.1 (89.8)	32.1 (89.8)	36.4 (97.5)
Mean maximum °C (°F)	29.2 (84.6)	28.8 (83.8)	26.3 (79.3)	23.9 (75.0)	20.7 (69.3)	18.3 (64.9)	17.2 (63.0)	18.0 (64.4)	20.4 (68.7)	23.1 (73.6)	25.5 (77.9)	26.9 (80.4)	30.3 (86.5)
Mean daily maximum °C (°F)	24.3 (75.7)	24.5 (76.1)	22.9 (73.2)	20.3 (68.5)	17.6 (63.7)	15.1 (59.2)	14.4 (57.9)	15.2 (59.4)	16.7 (62.1)	18.5 (65.3)	20.4 (68.7)	22.5 (72.5)	19.4 (66.9)
Daily mean °C (°F)	19.2 (66.6)	19.5 (67.1)	17.6 (63.7)	14.9 (58.8)	12.3 (54.1)	9.9 (49.8)	9.3 (48.7)	10.0 (50.0)	11.7 (53.1)	13.6 (56.5)	15.4 (59.7)	17.9 (64.2)	14.3 (57.7)
Mean daily minimum °C (°F)	14.2 (57.6)	14.5 (58.1)	12.3 (54.1)	9.6 (49.3)	7.0 (44.6)	4.6 (40.3)	4.1 (39.4)	4.7 (40.5)	6.8 (44.2)	8.7 (47.7)	10.4 (50.7)	13.2 (55.8)	9.2 (48.5)
Mean minimum °C (°F)	7.6 (45.7)	8.3 (46.9)	6.0 (42.8)	2.6 (36.7)	0.4 (32.7)	−1.1 (30.0)	−1.4 (29.5)	−1.1 (30.0)	0.5 (32.9)	2.2 (36.0)	3.8 (38.8)	6.7 (44.1)	−2.0 (28.4)
Record low °C (°F)	3.0 (37.4)	3.5 (38.3)	1.2 (34.2)	−1.1 (30.0)	−1.8 (28.8)	−4.1 (24.6)	−4.0 (24.8)	−3.3 (26.1)	−2.0 (28.4)	−1.3 (29.7)	0.2 (32.4)	0.4 (32.7)	−4.1 (24.6)
Average rainfall mm (inches)	72.4 (2.85)	79.6 (3.13)	87.0 (3.43)	122.1 (4.81)	117.9 (4.64)	130.4 (5.13)	136.1 (5.36)	105.5 (4.15)	88.6 (3.49)	92.7 (3.65)	63.8 (2.51)	99.7 (3.93)	1,195.8 (47.08)
Mean monthly sunshine hours	270.2	230.5	233.9	192.9	174.5	137.8	148.7	182.9	184.3	225.7	237.2	248.0	2,466.6
Mean daily daylight hours	14.5	13.5	12.3	11.1	10.1	9.6	9.8	10.7	11.9	13.1	14.2	14.7	12.1
Percentage possible sunshine	60	60	61	58	56	48	49	55	52	56	56	54	55
Source 1: NIWA
Source 2: Weather Spark

Climate data for Whakatāne (Ōhope) (1981–2010)
Month	Jan	Feb	Mar	Apr	May	Jun	Jul	Aug	Sep	Oct	Nov	Dec	Year
Mean daily maximum °C (°F)	23.8 (74.8)	24.3 (75.7)	22.8 (73.0)	20.3 (68.5)	17.7 (63.9)	15.4 (59.7)	14.9 (58.8)	15.5 (59.9)	16.9 (62.4)	18.4 (65.1)	20.0 (68.0)	22.0 (71.6)	19.3 (66.8)
Daily mean °C (°F)	19.5 (67.1)	20.1 (68.2)	18.5 (65.3)	16.0 (60.8)	13.5 (56.3)	11.2 (52.2)	10.6 (51.1)	11.1 (52.0)	12.7 (54.9)	14.2 (57.6)	15.9 (60.6)	18.0 (64.4)	15.1 (59.2)
Mean daily minimum °C (°F)	15.3 (59.5)	15.9 (60.6)	14.1 (57.4)	11.7 (53.1)	9.4 (48.9)	7.1 (44.8)	6.3 (43.3)	6.7 (44.1)	8.4 (47.1)	10.1 (50.2)	11.9 (53.4)	14.0 (57.2)	10.9 (51.6)
Average rainfall mm (inches)	82.0 (3.23)	72.5 (2.85)	75.7 (2.98)	72.7 (2.86)	71.0 (2.80)	108.9 (4.29)	84.5 (3.33)	104.5 (4.11)	80.3 (3.16)	88.5 (3.48)	86.2 (3.39)	74.6 (2.94)	1,001.4 (39.42)
Mean monthly sunshine hours	240.1	207.9	195.7	198.1	164.4	132.4	159.9	160.2	172.5	193.3	202.1	234.1	2,260.7
Source: NIWA

Whakatāne has frequently recorded the highest annual sunshine hours in New Zealand (year and respective sunshine hours shown below). Since official recording began in 2008, the town has frequently attained upwards of 2600 hours a year. The town recorded an average of over 7.5hrs of sunshine a day in 2013. Whakatāne also records the national daily high (temp) on approximately 55 days of the year.

=== Natural disasters ===
Whakatāne was affected by the 1987 Edgecumbe earthquake. Heavy rain struck the Bay of Plenty region between 16 and 18 July 2004, resulting in severe flooding and a state of civil emergency being declared. Many homes and properties were flooded, forcing thousands of Whakatāne residents to evacuate. The Rangitaiki River burst its banks, flooding large areas of farmland, and numerous roads were closed by floods and slips. A total of 245.8 mm (9 3/4") of rain fell in Whakatāne in the 48-hour period and many small earthquakes were also felt during this time, loosening the sodden earth and resulting in landslips that claimed two lives.

Whakatane is also the closest town to Whakaari / White Island, which experienced a fatal eruption in 2019. The town was heavily affected by the disaster in which 22 lost their lives.

== Industries and tourism ==
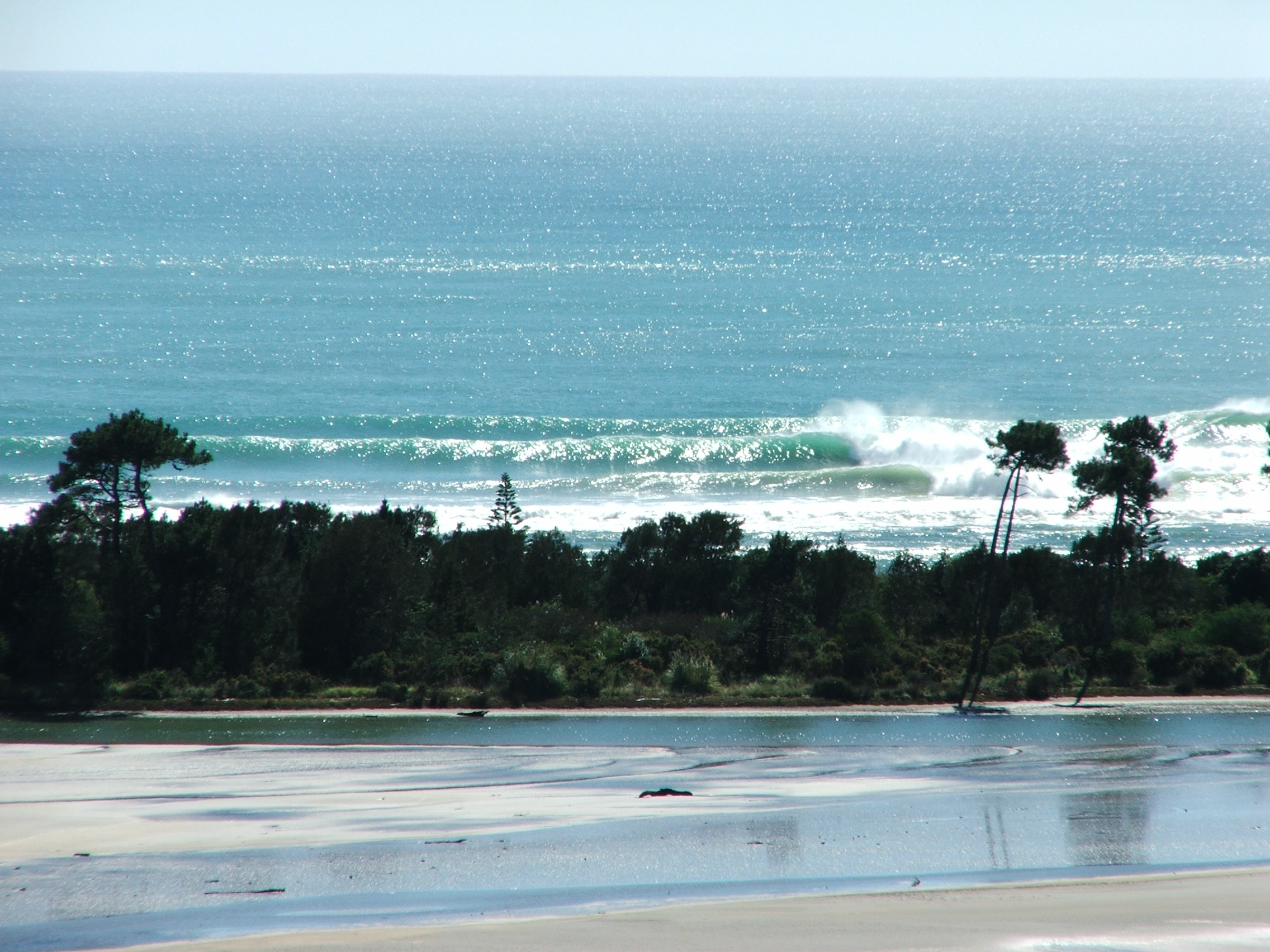
A 1.8 m (6 ft) groundswell at the Whakatāne Heads

The town's main industries are diverse: forestry, tourism, agriculture, horticulture, fishing and manufacturing are all well-established. There is a large carton board packaging mill, a newspaper press, and a brewery.

While farming and forestry activities remain the dominant sectors, tourism is a growing industry for Whakatāne, with a continued increase in guest nights in the district. White Island is a key attraction. Popular tourist activities include the beaches, swimming with dolphins, whale watching, chartered fishing cruises, surf tours, amateur astronomy, hunting, experiences of Maori culture and bush walking. Whakatāne is also used as a base for many tourists who wish to explore other activities in the surrounding region.

Aquaculture is an emerging industry for the Eastern Bay, with the development of a 3800 hectare (15 sq. mi.) marine farm 8.5 km (4 1/2 n.mi.) offshore of Ōpōtiki, expected to produce 20,000 tonnes of mussels per annum by 2025 and add $35 million to regional GDP. Whakatāne is home to the regional radio station One Double X – 1XX – one of the first privately owned commercial radio stations on air in New Zealand in the early 1970s.

Whakatāne has become the dominant commercial service centre for the Eastern Bay. In 2006, a large-format shopping centre (The Hub Whakatane) was built on the edge of town anchored by national chains Bunnings Warehouse and Harvey Norman. Its retail space totals 24,000sqm (6 acres) and includes 900 car parks. Prior to the centre's construction, it was estimated around $30 million in local retail spending was being lost to large format retail stores in neighbouring Tauranga and Rotorua.

Whakatāne Museum, a local museum operating across two premises with changing exhibitions, opened in 1972.

== Infrastructure ==
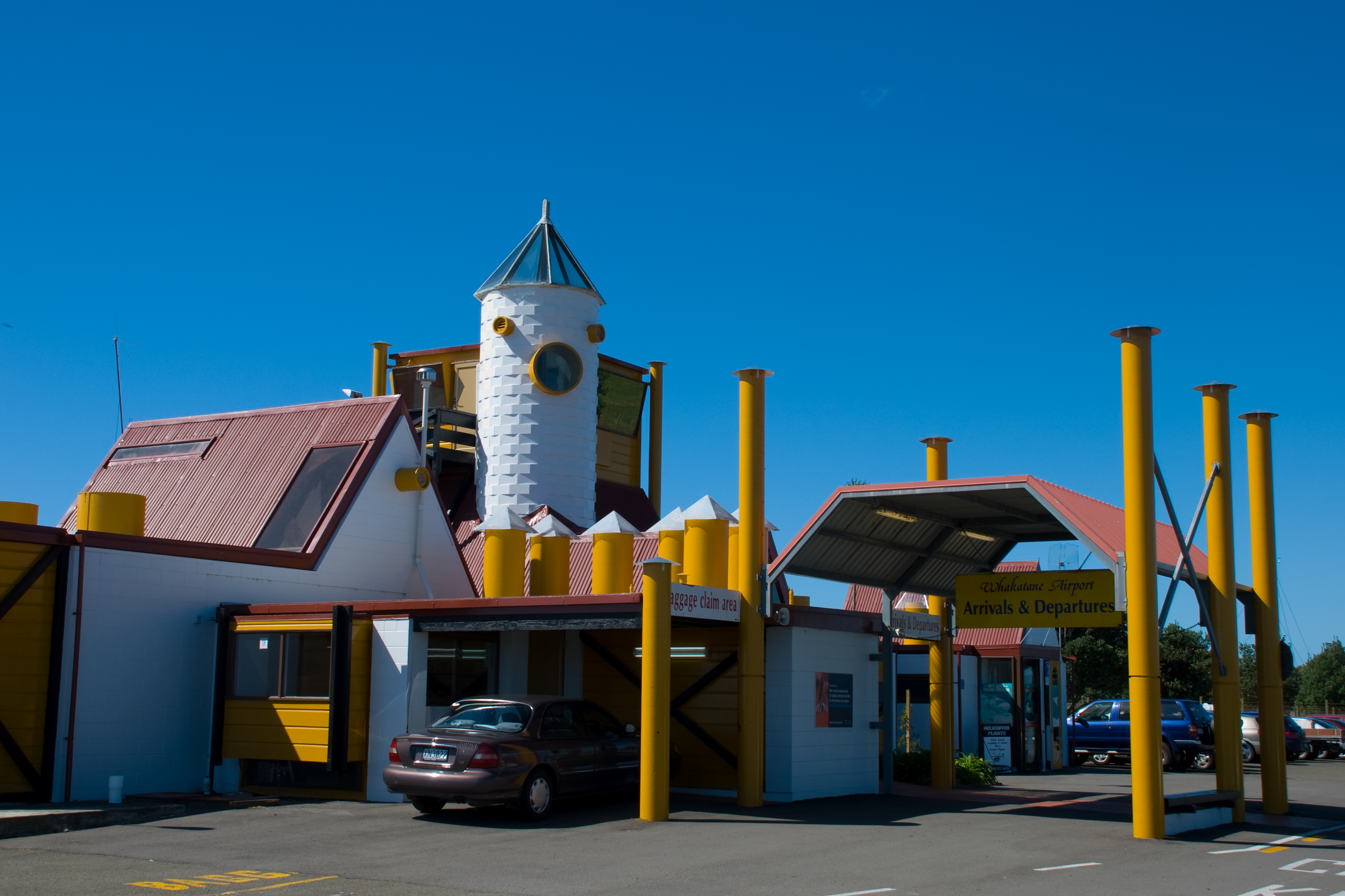
The terminal of the Whakatāne Airport

Whakatāne Airport is served by Air Chathams with direct flights to Auckland using Saab 340 aircraft. Air New Zealand previously operated the Auckland service until April 2015. Private cars, limited public transport and taxis (as well as cycling and walking) are the primary modes of transport for residents.

Whakatāne sits at the eastern end of State Highway 30. State Highway 2 bypasses the urban area.

=== Bus ===
Baybus runs between Whakatāne and Ōhope. Furthermore, once-daily return bus services operate to Tauranga, en route from Kawerau and Ōpōtiki on alternate weekdays. Bee Cards were introduced for fares on 27 July 2020.

=== Marine ===
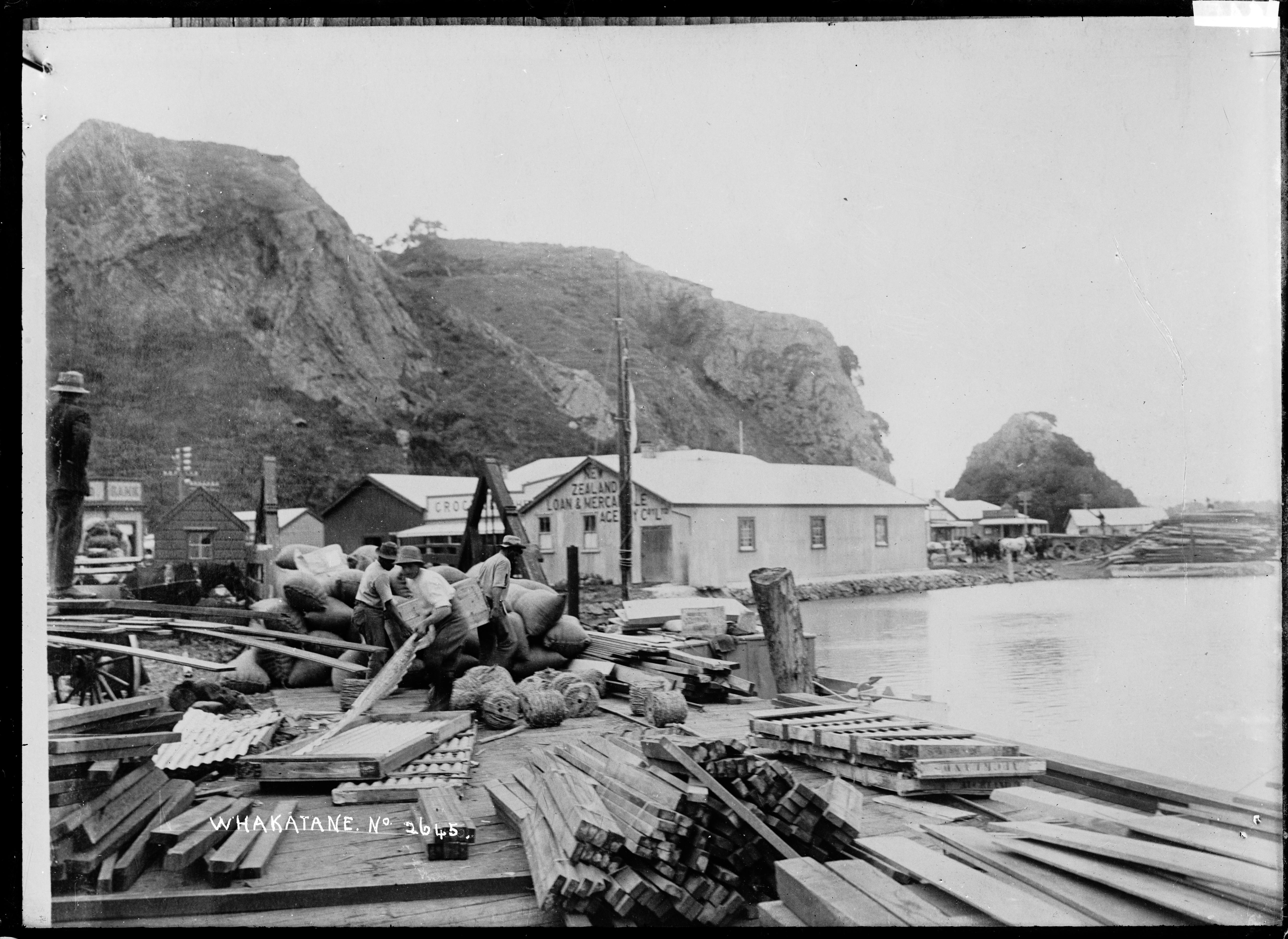
People working at the Whakatane wharf, c. 1910.

Coastal trading, including scows and steamships – notably the Northern Steamship Company service, which ran until 1959, used Whakatāne as a port of call. Today it primarily services charter vessels, commercial & recreational fishing vessels. The depth of water over the Whakatāne River entrance has been a limiting factor to the development of better port facilities, but it is generally held that a training wall along the western edge of the entrance would allow greater depths and safer crossings.

=== Rail ===
A passenger train called the Taneatua Express ran on the East Coast Main Trunk Railway (ECMT) as far as Taneatua until 1959. The Tāneatua Branch line was formerly part of the ECMT and connected with the current ECMT at Hawkens Junction.

A private railway line operated by Whakatane Board Mills (now Carter Holt Harvey Whakatāne) formerly connected the company's mill on the western side of the river to the Tāneatua Branch line at Awakeri. The Whakatane Board Mills Line was freight only, with no passenger service. In 1999 operation of the Whakatane Board Mills line was taken over by Tranz Rail (now KiwiRail) and the line was renamed the Whakatane Industrial line. The line has since been closed and lifted, and the Tāneatua Branch line is used for tourist excursions.

== Education ==
Whakatāne has two secondary schools: Whakatāne High School, with a roll of 1,235, and Trident High School, with a roll of 843. Whakatāne High School opened in 1920 as Whakatane District High School, and became a full high school (dropping primary classes) in 1950. Trident High School opened in 1973.

Two tertiary institutes, Te Whare Wānanga o Awanuiārangi and Toi Ohomai Institute of Technology, have campuses in Whakatāne.

The town has three state primary schools for Year 1 to 6 students: Allandale School, established c. 1954, with a roll of 339; Apanui School, established by 1955, with a roll of 419; and James Street School, established in 1958, with a roll of 240.

There is one public state intermediate school for Year 7 to 8 students: Whakatāne Intermediate, with a roll of 586. It opened in 1968.

Whakatāne also has two state-integrated Christian primary schools for Year 1 to 8 students: St Joseph's Catholic School, established in 1933, with a roll of 259; and Whakatane Seventh-day Adventist School, with a roll of 52.

Te Kura Kaupapa Māori o Te Orini ki Ngati Awa is a state Māori language immersion primary school in Coastlands for Year 1 to 8 students, with a roll of 96. It opened in 2013.

All these schools are co-educational. Rolls are as of July 2026.

== Notable people ==
- Lisa Carrington, New Zealand flatwater canoer
- Lindy Chamberlain, New Zealand-Australian woman wrongly convicted in one of Australia's most publicised murder trials
- Zena Elliott, Māori artist
- Maurice Gee, New Zealand author
- Joe Harawira, environmental campaigner
- Patrick Herbert, New Zealand rugby league player
- Francis Kora, Māori musician and actor
- Margaret Mahy, New Zealand author
- Benji Marshall, New Zealand rugby league and rugby union player
- Mike Moore, New Zealand politician and Prime Minister
- Albert Oliphant Stewart (1884–1958), tribal leader and local politician
- Rex Patrick, Australian politician
- Alexander Peebles (1856–1934), first chairman of the Whakatāne County Council in 1900
- Eve Rimmer, New Zealand paraplegic athlete
- Ian Shearer, New Zealand politician
- Sarah Walker, New Zealand BMX racer
- Hayden Wilde, New Zealand triathlete
- John Rowles, singer
