= Murupara Branch =

Railway line in Murupara, New Zealand

Murupara Branch Kawerau Branch

Overview
- Status: Open
- Owner: New Zealand Railways Corporation
- Termini: Hawkens Junction Kawerau; Murupara

Service
- Operator(s): KiwiRail

History
- Opened: 4 April 1955

Technical
- Line length: 14 km (8.7 mi); 57.65 km (35.82 mi)
- Number of tracks: Single
- Character: Rural
- Track gauge: 1,067 mm (3 ft 6 in)

Map

The Murupara Branch is a 57 kilometres (35 mi) long branch railway line from the East Coast Main Trunk (ECMT) at Kawerau to Murupara, built to serve a new pulp and paper mill harvesting the radiata pine trees of the Kaingaroa Forest on the Kaingaroa Plateau in the Bay of Plenty, New Zealand. The line was the last major extension of the New Zealand Railways Department (NZR) network, of 14 kilometres (8.7 mi) from Hawkens Junction, west of Edgecumbe, to Kawerau and 57 km from Kawerau to Murupara. The portion from Hawkens Junction to Kawerau was known as the Kawerau Branch until 1978, when it became part of the ECMT, and the former ECMT from Hawkens Junction to Taneatua became the Taneatua Branch.

== History ==
Construction of the line began in 1951, but in March 1953 it was decided to build the mill at Kawerau not Murupara, because Kawerau had geothermal steam for energy, and the climate of Murupara in winter is misty, so was less suitable for a large town. The branch was built via Kawerau to Murupara rather than directly from Hawkens Junction near Edgecumbe. The Kawerau to Murupara section required major earthworks to limit the ruling grade against loaded log trains to 1 in 60. The easy grades between Kawerau and the port of Mt Maunganui allow very long trains of over 2,000 tonnes.

Work on the section to the mill started on 12 April 1953; the rails reached Kawerau in August and the first train arrived at Kawerau on 26 October, six months after work started. The major earthworks on the Kawerau to Murupara section were completed rapidly with heavy earthmoving machinery, then prefabricated track sections were laid at the rate of 3 km a week. The first logs were loaded at Galatea (48 km from Kawerau and 9 km from Murupara) on 4 April 1955. A regular service to Murupara operated from 15 January 1957, although the line to Kawerau and Murupara was operated by the Ministry of Works (the successor to the PWD or Public Works Department) until 1 July 1957.

== Motive power ==
As the line ran through forest areas, steam locomotives were not used on the line, and motive power has only ever been provided by diesel engines. Initially, the D^{E} class were used for construction then for log trains on the still unsettled track bed; this has given the D^{E} class an unofficial status of the first mainline diesel-electric locomotive in NZR service. The D^{E} class were then replaced by D^{G} class locomotives in 1957. From October 1963 a pair of D^{A} class diesel locomotives were used, hauling 1,500-tonne log trains. From the 1980s to early 2000s the standard train was a trio of DC class locomotives hauling a gross load of 2,400 tonnes on 53 USL bogie log wagons. The primary motive power is now a pair of DL class locomotives.

The annual tonnage of logs increased from 730,000 tons in 1960 to 1,126,000 tonnes in 1965. After the opening of the Kaimai Tunnel in 1978 the section to Kawerau from Hawkens Junction was formally incorporated into the East Coast Main Trunk designation, with the line to Taneatua downgraded to branch status. The section from Kawerau to Murupara became the Murupara Branch, and then the Murupara Line from 2011.

== See also ==
- East Coast Main Trunk
- Mount Maunganui Branch
- Tāneatua Branch
- Whakatane Board Mills Line
