= Paeroa–Pōkeno Line =

Railway line in New Zealand

Map showing the section of the route that was partially constructed

The Paeroa-Pōkeno railway line or deviation in the upper North Island of New Zealand between Paeroa on the East Coast Main Trunk (ECMT) and Pōkeno on the North Island Main Trunk (NIMT) was a proposed route with construction started but abandoned. The proposal has been revived in recent years as part of a more direct route between Auckland and Tauranga.

== History ==
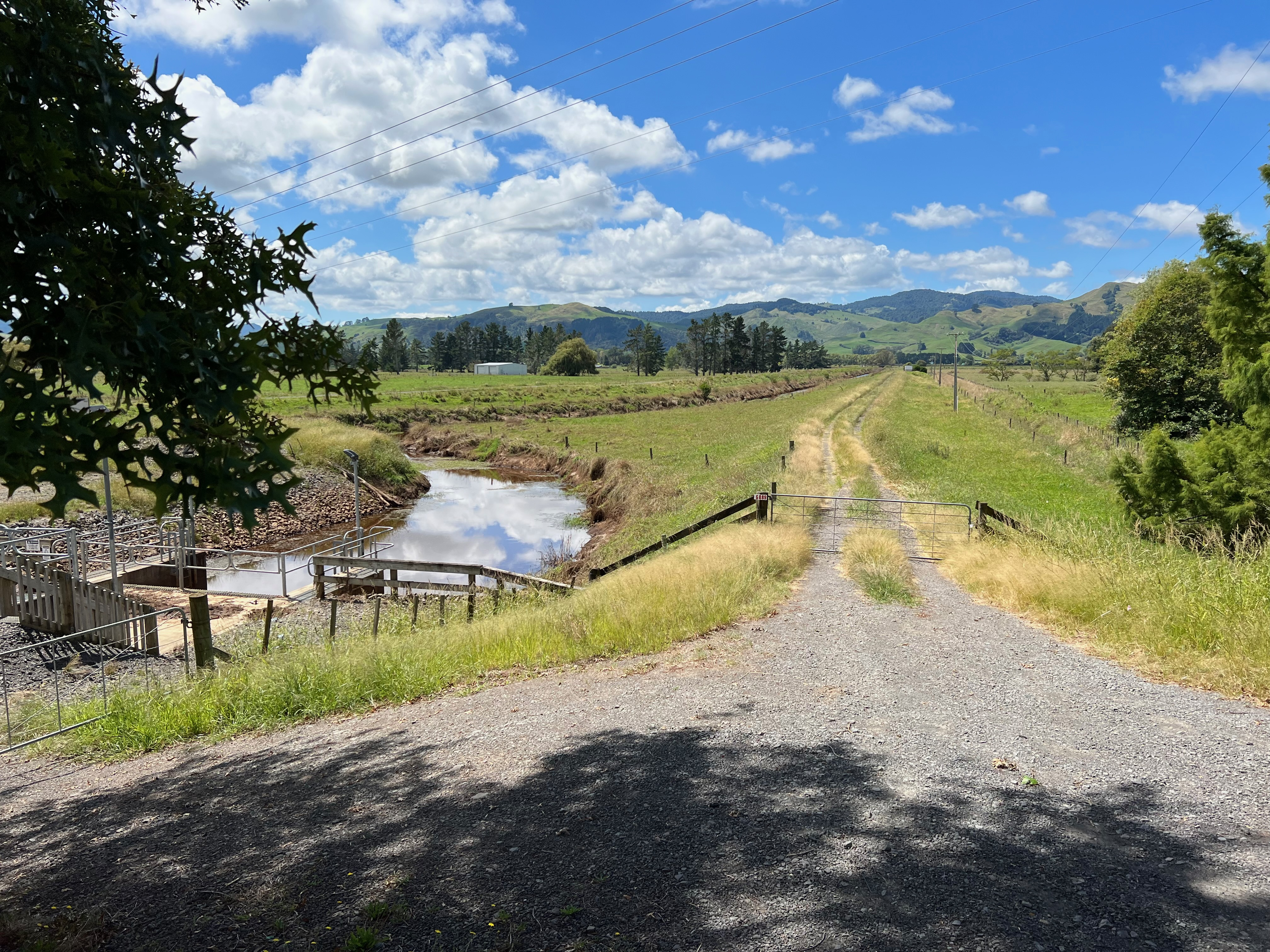
Bank near Paeroa in 2023, one of the surviving structures of the Pōkeno-Paeroa railway

A request for the line was made in 1905 and a route surveyed in 1926. Proposals were also made to shorten the route by a further 12 mi (19 km), by starting it at Manurewa and serving Hūnua. Work started in 1938 on the 42 mi 69 ch (69.0 km) line, which would have shortened the distance from Auckland to towns on the ECMT by 45 mi 69 ch (73.8 km). In March 1937 the Kerepeehi Farmers' Union supported construction of the Paeroa to Pōkeno link.

Minister of Public Works, Bob Semple, turned the first sod on 27 January 1938 at Paeroa and about 32 mi (51 km) of the 42 mi (68 km) line had been started when work was abandoned in 1940. Work was still making slow progress in 1950, when a paragraph in the Ministry of Works annual report said 20 private crossings had been formed and metaled and 456 ft (139 m) of culverts installed. However, also in 1950 the Auckland Star reported, "that though railway executives have the Paeroa-Pokeno project in mind, other works are regarded as more important. Given a free hand with the limited money available for construction, they would favour Main Trunk and Auckland suburban electrification." Most of the work was still in place in the 1960s, though very little is now visible.

Work stopped in 1952, when only £2,465 was spent of £4,000 allocated. It followed the Minister of Railways, Stan Goosman, (also a local road haulier) setting up a Commission to Inquire Into New Zealand Government Railways. It reported the line had cost £249,000, completion would cost over £2m and it would lose £46,120 a year.

The Kaimai Tunnel relegated this section to ghost status; in August 1962 a deviation from Wahora to Apata passing under the Kaimai Range in a long 8.85 km (5.50 mi) tunnel was approved. Work on the tunnel did not commence until 1969. With the opening of the tunnel in 1978, the Paeroa – Katikati section of the East Coast Main Trunk was closed. The line to Paeroa was then part of the Thames Branch, which closed north of Waitoa in 1991.

Originally the line was to be the first part of the East Coast Main Trunk Railway crossing the Bay of Plenty to Ōpōtiki and then inland to Gisborne via the Moutohora Branch.

== Revival ==
During the 2014 New Zealand general election the New Zealand First political party included a proposal to build a Pōkeno-Paeroa-Te Aroha-Kaimai tunnel railway line as part of its "Railways of National Significance" transport policy. The policy consists of completing the Pōkeno-Paeroa line, re-using part of the now-closed Thames Branch between Paeroa and Te Aroha and a new link between Te Aroha and the western portal of the Kaimai tunnel, altogether creating a more direct link along a faster route, providing more capacity on the very busy rail freight corridor between Auckland and Tauranga, together with linking the towns of Maramarua, Ngatea, Paeroa and Te Aroha as potential future satellite suburbs of Auckland on a new commuter rail service route between Auckland and Tauranga.

== See also ==
- Paeroa Railway Station
- Pokeno Railway Station
- Taneatua Express
