= Kawerau =

Town in the Bay of Plenty, New Zealand

- Minor urban area
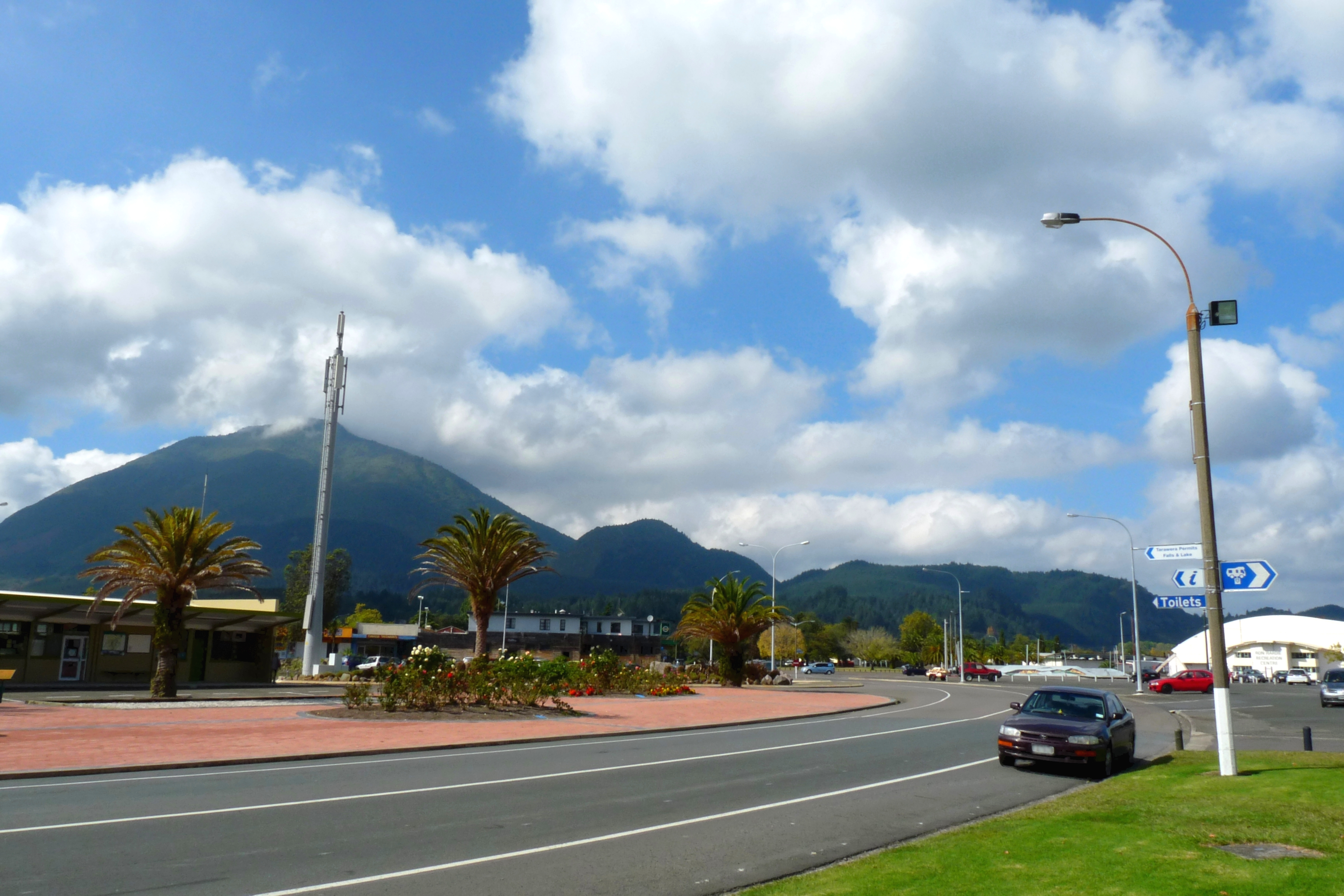
- Kawerau, with Putauaki in the background

- Kawerau district within the North Island
- Coordinates: 38°06′S 176°42′E
- Country: New Zealand
- Region: Bay of Plenty
- Established: 1953
- Electorates: East Cape (general); Waiariki (Māori)

Government
  - Mayor: Faylene Tunui
  - Territorial authority: Kawerau District Council
  - East Cape MP: Dana Kirkpatrick
  - Waiariki MP: Rawiri Waititi

Area
  - Land: 23.56 km^{2} (9.10 sq mi)

Population (June 2025)
  - District: 7,680
  - Density: 326/km^{2} (844/sq mi)
  - Urban: 7,680
- Time zone: UTC+12 (NZST)
  - Summer (DST): UTC+13 (NZDT)
- Postcode: 3127
- Area code: 07
- Website: Kawerau District Council

Kawerau is a town in the Bay of Plenty Region on the North Island of New Zealand. It is situated 100 km south-east of Tauranga and 58 km east of Rotorua. It is the seat of the Kawerau District Council, and the only town in Kawerau District.

Kawerau is a small community, with an economy that is largely driven by the nearby pulp and paper mill that is run by Norske Skog and OJI Fibre Solutions. It is located along State Highway 34, southwest of Onepu, and is the terminus of the East Coast Main Trunk Railway, and the commencing point of the Murupara Branch railway.

Kawerau is among the three towns in New Zealand with a majority Māori population, along with Ōpōtiki and Wairoa. Kawerau was one of the worst-affected towns in the 1987 Edgecumbe earthquake.

== History and culture ==
=== European settlement ===
Kawerau, one of the youngest towns in New Zealand, was founded in 1953 as a mill town for the new Tasman pulp and paper mill. The site for the mill was chosen by the Tasman Pulp and Paper Company because of the ready availability of geothermal energy, water from the Tarawera River and the large supply of pine timber from the nearby Kaingaroa Forest. The town site was chosen in February 1953.

Unlike most other towns of its size, Kawerau was carefully planned before construction. The town was built with an impressive number of facilities, to accommodate a multinational specialist workforce. The mill continues to drive the local economy and greatly influences the fortunes of the town. The town's population peaked in the early 1980s (8718 in the 1981 census) but has declined significantly since then due to the restructuring of the mill and of associated industries.

=== Recent history ===
In 2012, mill owner Norske Skog said it would be shutting one of the two newsprint machines at the mill, which was built in the 1950s. In January 2013, it was confirmed that nearly half the mill's jobs would be lost.

Norse Skog of Norway, which is the world's second-biggest producer of newsprint, confirmed the closure of one of its two paper machines at the Tasman Mill at Kawerau with the loss of 110 jobs. The company first announced its intention to shut one machine in September 2012, following a review of its newsprint capacity in Australasia. The remaining Tasman machine would continue to produce newsprint, predominantly for the New Zealand and Australian markets. Norske Skog management would work closely with employees, unions and other stakeholders on the detailed closure arrangements, including a mill-wide restructuring programme. Peter McCartey, General Manager of Tasman Mill said it was widely understood the decision had been brought about by global market forces within the industry. The second paper machine had operated successfully for over 50 years. Norske Skog has the widest geographical spread of all the paper producers, with mills in 11 countries on all continents except Africa and Antarctica.

As of July 16, 2021, all of the three newsprint paper machines have ceased operation due to less demand as the world is going digital.

Kawerau is also home to geothermal power supply Kawerau Power Station for the local industry as well as the rest of New Zealand.

=== Marae ===
The local marae, Tohia o te Rangi, is affiliated with the Ngāti Tūwharetoa hapū of Ngāi Tamarangi. It features the Waitaha Ariki Kore meeting house.

== Demographics ==
Kawerau District covers 23.56 km^{2} (9.10 sq mi). Stats NZ describes it as a small urban area. It had an estimated population of 7,680 as of June 2025, with a population density of 326 people per km^{2}.

Historical population
Year	Pop.	±% p.a.
2006	6,921	—
2013	6,363	−1.19%
2018	7,146	+2.35%
2023	7,539	+1.08%

Kawerau District had a population of 7,539 in the 2023 New Zealand census, an increase of 393 people (5.5%) since the 2018 census, and an increase of 1,176 people (18.5%) since the 2013 census. There were 3,720 males, 3,804 females, and 15 people of other genders in 2,418 dwellings. 1.9% of people identified as LGBTIQ+. The median age was 38.6 years (compared with 38.1 years nationally). There were 1,680 people (22.3%) aged under 15 years, 1,332 (17.7%) aged 15 to 29, 2,994 (39.7%) aged 30 to 64, and 1,527 (20.3%) aged 65 or older.

People could identify as more than one ethnicity. The results were 53.8% European (Pākehā); 63.2% Māori; 4.7% Pasifika; 3.3% Asian; 0.3% Middle Eastern, Latin American and African New Zealanders (MELAA); and 1.8% other, which includes people giving their ethnicity as "New Zealander". English was spoken by 96.3%, Māori by 18.3%, Samoan by 0.2%, and other languages by 3.5%. No language could be spoken by 2.3% (e.g. too young to talk). New Zealand Sign Language was known by 0.6%. The percentage of people born overseas was 10.0, compared with 28.8% nationally.

Religious affiliations were 26.7% Christian, 0.3% Hindu, 0.1% Muslim, 9.6% Māori religious beliefs, 0.3% Buddhist, 0.5% New Age, and 0.8% other religions. People who answered that they had no religion were 53.4%, and 9.0% of people did not answer the census question.

Of those at least 15 years old, 513 (8.8%) people had a bachelor's or higher degree, 3,549 (60.6%) had a post-high school certificate or diploma, and 1,794 (30.6%) people exclusively held high school qualifications. The median income was $29,200, compared with $41,500 nationally. 249 people (4.2%) earned over $100,000 compared to 12.1% nationally. The employment status of those at least 15 was 2,220 (37.9%) full-time, 609 (10.4%) part-time, and 480 (8.2%) unemployed.

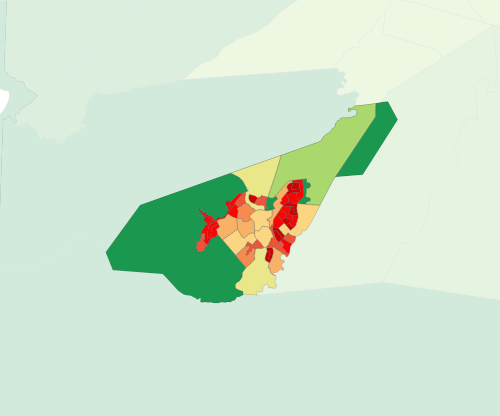
Population density in the 2023 census

Individual statistical areas
Name	Area (km^{2})	Population	Density (per km^{2})	Dwellings	Median age	Median income
Monika Reserve	14.18	3,297	233	1,140	41.4 years	$30,600
Kawerau Industrial	5.82	75	13	48	48.0 years	$22,000
Kawerau Central	1.75	2,634	1,505	723	34.2 years	$28,900
Tarawera Park	1.81	1,530	845	507	40.8 years	$28,300
New Zealand					38.1 years	$41,500

== Geography ==
The 820 metres (2,690 ft) volcanic cone of Mount Edgecumbe/Putauaki lies 3 kilometres (1.9 mi) to the east of Kawerau, and is easily visible from the town. The Tarawera River straddles Kawerau to the east and continues north to the Bay of Plenty. Water is supplied to the town from two natural springs. Kawerau's water was judged the best-tasting in New Zealand in 2003 and 2004.

Kawerau has access to vast geothermal resources. There are a number of geothermal hot springs in the surrounding bush owned and operated by local families. The Kawerau geothermal field provides steam power for the paper mill, and a 90 MW geothermal power station is currently under construction.

The District has a land area of 23.56 km^{2} (9.10 sq mi), making it the smallest territorial authority in New Zealand in terms of land area. It is completely surrounded by the Whakatāne District.

== Climate ==
In January 2008, the temperature exceeded 30 °C for five days. In winter (July to August) crisp early morning frosts are usually followed by clear, sunny days, and the average daily maximum temperature is around 15.6 °C.

Rainfall is spread throughout the year, though it is not uncommon to experience a drought during summer.

Climate data for Kawerau (1991–2020 normals, extremes 1954–present)
Month	Jan	Feb	Mar	Apr	May	Jun	Jul	Aug	Sep	Oct	Nov	Dec	Year
Record high °C (°F)	37.0 (98.6)	35.6 (96.1)	32.1 (89.8)	29.7 (85.5)	24.8 (76.6)	22.1 (71.8)	21.1 (70.0)	22.0 (71.6)	26.0 (78.8)	28.8 (83.8)	34.6 (94.3)	34.8 (94.6)	37.0 (98.6)
Mean daily maximum °C (°F)	25.8 (78.4)	25.6 (78.1)	24.0 (75.2)	21.0 (69.8)	18.1 (64.6)	15.5 (59.9)	14.8 (58.6)	15.9 (60.6)	17.7 (63.9)	20.0 (68.0)	22.2 (72.0)	24.0 (75.2)	20.4 (68.7)
Daily mean °C (°F)	19.8 (67.6)	19.9 (67.8)	18.2 (64.8)	15.2 (59.4)	12.6 (54.7)	10.2 (50.4)	9.4 (48.9)	10.3 (50.5)	12.1 (53.8)	14.3 (57.7)	16.3 (61.3)	18.5 (65.3)	14.7 (58.5)
Mean daily minimum °C (°F)	13.8 (56.8)	14.2 (57.6)	12.3 (54.1)	9.5 (49.1)	7.2 (45.0)	4.9 (40.8)	4.0 (39.2)	4.8 (40.6)	6.6 (43.9)	8.6 (47.5)	10.3 (50.5)	12.9 (55.2)	9.1 (48.4)
Record low °C (°F)	3.7 (38.7)	3.1 (37.6)	1.0 (33.8)	−3.3 (26.1)	−4.2 (24.4)	−4.0 (24.8)	−4.4 (24.1)	−4.3 (24.3)	−1.4 (29.5)	−2.1 (28.2)	0.7 (33.3)	2.0 (35.6)	−4.4 (24.1)
Average rainfall mm (inches)	118.4 (4.66)	131.6 (5.18)	134.8 (5.31)	134.3 (5.29)	115.8 (4.56)	155.4 (6.12)	140.0 (5.51)	148.7 (5.85)	127.8 (5.03)	162.3 (6.39)	140.9 (5.55)	132.6 (5.22)	1,642.6 (64.67)
Mean monthly sunshine hours	234.5	199.6	208.2	178.6	160.4	133.3	158.4	146.5	170.4	202.8	237.1	204.0	2,233.8
Source: NIWA (rain 1981–2010)

Climate data for Tarawera Forest (5km SW of Kawerau) (1971–1982)
Month	Jan	Feb	Mar	Apr	May	Jun	Jul	Aug	Sep	Oct	Nov	Dec	Year
Record high °C (°F)	33.4 (92.1)	34.6 (94.3)	29.8 (85.6)	27.3 (81.1)	22.5 (72.5)	22.3 (72.1)	18.5 (65.3)	19.5 (67.1)	24.4 (75.9)	29.4 (84.9)	32.0 (89.6)	29.6 (85.3)	34.6 (94.3)
Mean maximum °C (°F)	30.6 (87.1)	30.2 (86.4)	27.1 (80.8)	24.5 (76.1)	20.9 (69.6)	18.8 (65.8)	17.0 (62.6)	18.2 (64.8)	20.3 (68.5)	24.3 (75.7)	27.2 (81.0)	28.5 (83.3)	31.5 (88.7)
Mean daily maximum °C (°F)	25.2 (77.4)	25.1 (77.2)	23.2 (73.8)	20.3 (68.5)	16.9 (62.4)	14.1 (57.4)	13.5 (56.3)	14.7 (58.5)	16.5 (61.7)	19.1 (66.4)	21.3 (70.3)	23.2 (73.8)	19.4 (67.0)
Daily mean °C (°F)	19.0 (66.2)	18.9 (66.0)	17.1 (62.8)	14.0 (57.2)	10.4 (50.7)	8.2 (46.8)	7.4 (45.3)	8.7 (47.7)	10.5 (50.9)	13.1 (55.6)	15.4 (59.7)	17.2 (63.0)	13.3 (56.0)
Mean daily minimum °C (°F)	12.7 (54.9)	12.6 (54.7)	11.0 (51.8)	7.6 (45.7)	3.9 (39.0)	2.2 (36.0)	1.3 (34.3)	2.7 (36.9)	4.5 (40.1)	7.1 (44.8)	9.4 (48.9)	11.2 (52.2)	7.2 (44.9)
Mean minimum °C (°F)	4.7 (40.5)	5.1 (41.2)	2.8 (37.0)	0.2 (32.4)	−2.4 (27.7)	−4.4 (24.1)	−4.3 (24.3)	−3.3 (26.1)	−2.4 (27.7)	−0.2 (31.6)	1.7 (35.1)	4.5 (40.1)	−5.3 (22.5)
Record low °C (°F)	1.5 (34.7)	1.6 (34.9)	−1.8 (28.8)	−2.0 (28.4)	−3.3 (26.1)	−7.6 (18.3)	−7.5 (18.5)	−5.7 (21.7)	−3.5 (25.7)	−2.1 (28.2)	−1.3 (29.7)	1.5 (34.7)	−7.6 (18.3)
Average rainfall mm (inches)	92.0 (3.62)	139.6 (5.50)	187.4 (7.38)	196.9 (7.75)	166.2 (6.54)	230.4 (9.07)	172.7 (6.80)	193.3 (7.61)	151.7 (5.97)	160.5 (6.32)	135.1 (5.32)	140.1 (5.52)	1,965.9 (77.4)
Source: Earth Sciences NZ (rain 1971–2000)

== Events ==
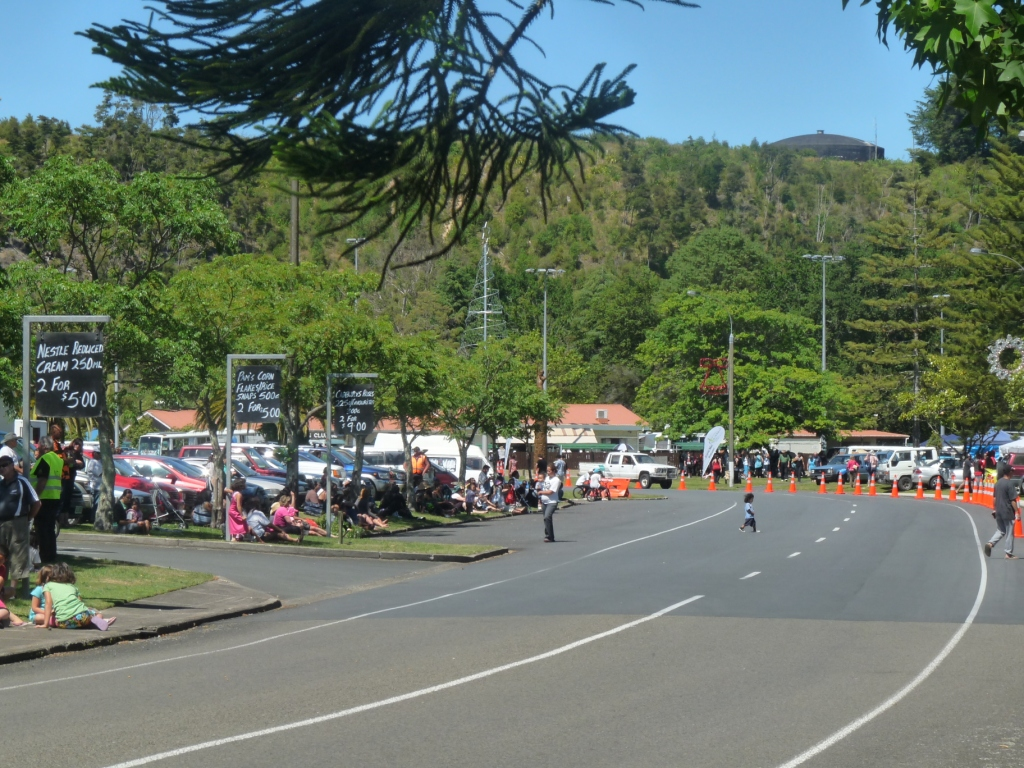
Plunket Street in the town centre during the 2009 Christmas Parade.

Kawerau hosts a number of events each year, including the National Woodskills Festival, 'King of the Mountain' race and the Tarawera 100 motorcycle endurance race. Kawerau is also growing as an event venue for white water rapid competitions such as kayaking and rafting. Kawerau was a venue for the 2013 World Rafting Championships.

=== Kawerau Woodfest & National Woodskills Competition ===
The National Woodskills Festival is a competition that encompasses a broad spectrum of wood craftsmanship and wood art. Some of the competitors are professionals, but many are amateurs. The Woodskills Festival was first held in Kawerau in 1989 as a local competition. By 1991, the event had become such a popular annual competition that it was developed into a national event, attracting exhibitors from throughout New Zealand. The competition has now developed into a broader range of attractions which captivates many skills from the Forestry Industry and now takes over the town for the weekend, in what is known as Kawerau Woodfest.

The annual Kawerau Woodfest attracts hundreds of visitors from around the country, making it the town's largest event and, as a result, is the highest economic beneficial event in Kawerau. As well as the Woodskills Festival, there is an Arts & Crafts Festival with displays open on Saturday and Sunday at various venues around Kawerau.

== Education ==
Kawerau has two state primary schools for Year 1 to 6 students: Kawerau Pūtauaki School, with a roll of 127; and Kawerau South School, with a roll of 331. Kawerau South opened in 1963.

Te Whata Tau o Pūtauaki is a Year 1 to 8 state primary school, with a roll of 96. It was formed by merging together Kawerau Central, Kawerau North and Kawerau Intermediate schools in 2011.

Tarawera High School is the town's Year 7 to 13 secondary school, with a roll of 452. Its predecessor Kawerau College opened in 1963. It became Tarawera High School in 2013 including Kawerau Intermediate. The Kawerau Teen Parent Unit is located in an old school house.

All these schools are co-educational. Rolls are as of July 2026.

== Notable residents ==
- Danielle Hayes, model
- Gill Gatfield, sculptor
- John Rowles, singer
- Ria van Dyke, model
- Sarah Walker, Women's BMX world champion
- William Warbrick, rugby league player

== See also ==
- Kawerau geothermal power station
- Tasman Mill
