= Trident High School =

Location
- Arawa Road; Whakatāne 3120; New Zealand; 37.9737°S 176.9762°E

Information
- Funding type: State
- Motto: Kia Manawa Nui (Be Courageous)
- Opened: February 1973
- Ministry of Education Institution no.: 143
- Principal: Philip Gurney
- Years offered: 9–13
- Gender: Coeducational
- Enrolment: 843 (July 2026)
- Socio-economic decile: 4K
- Website: www.trident.school.nz

Trident High School is a state coeducational secondary school located in Whakatāne, New Zealand. The school opened in February 1973 as the town's second secondary school, alongside Whakatane High School. Serving Years 9 to 13 (ages 12 to 18), the school has a roll of 843 students as of July 2026.

== Notable alumni ==
- Monica Falkner — New Zealand international netball player
- Kane Hames – All Black
- Hayden Wilde – NZ triathlete, Olympic bronze medallist
- Mererangi Paul – NZ Black ferns
- Mahina Paul – NZ women's rugby sevens player
- Sarah Walker (attended c. 2002–06) – BMX rider, Olympic silver medallist (2012 London)
