= Tasman Mill =

Pulp and paper mill in New Zealand

Coordinates: 38.074°S 176.720°E

The Tasman Mill site is a pulp and paper mill located on Fletcher Avenue just outside the town of Kawerau in New Zealand. The Tasman Mill site is the largest single employer in the Eastern Bay of Plenty region. Three pulp or paper companies previously operated in Kawerau: Norske Skog operated the mechanical pulp mill and newsprint paper mill; Oji Fibre Solutions, formerly Carter Holt Harvey, operated the kraft pulp mill; and SCA (now Essity) who manufacture tissue and base paper (physically separate mill on Fletcher Avenue).

The Tasman Pulp and Paper Mill has been a source of controversy due to the discharging of waste into the Tarawera River. Despite protests from locals (including the local Iwi), resource consent was renewed in 2009 to allow for discharge into the river for the next 25 years.

The workforce at the Tasman Mill declined from its peak in the 1980s. The Norske Skog Tasman mill that produced newsprint was closed in June 2021, with the loss of 160 jobs.

The main product from the Oji Fibre Solutions site is kraft pulp that is used for making containerboard and kraft paper.

== History ==
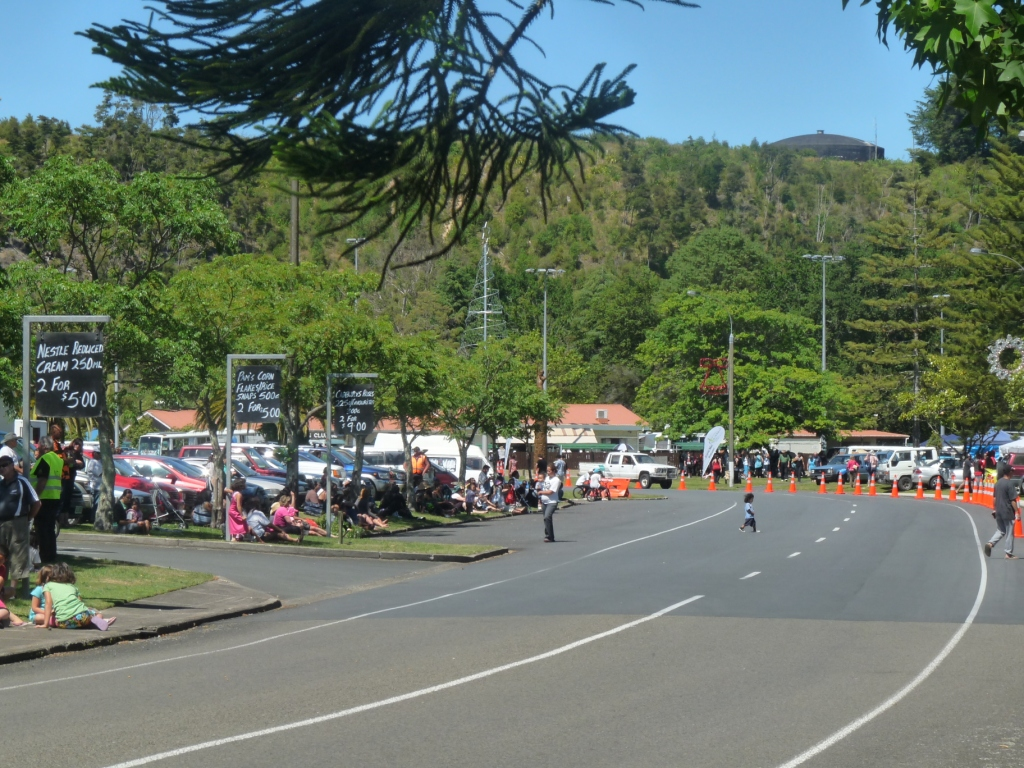
Kawerau, New Zealand

In 1952 the Tasman Pulp and Paper Company established a mill to process timber from maturing stands of radiata pine in the state-owned Kaingaroa Forest. The site was chosen because of the ready availability of geothermal steam as a power source. Land for the mill was purchased from local Māori landowners for £50 per acre. Pulping operations were underway by 1955.

In the 1970s a number of expansion projects took place within the mill which in turn led to a significant increase in employees. More recently, introduction of new technology, coupled with the decline of the timber industry from 1980 onwards, resulted in a decline in the mill's workforce, from around 2,000 in the mid-1980s to 1,200 in 1998. The population of Kawerau reduced from 8,593 in 1981 to 6,921 in 2006. In 2000, Fletcher Challenge sold its shareholding in the mill to Norske Skog.

The accessibility of geothermal energy led to the construction of an on-site 100 MW geothermal power station, commissioned in 2008. The plant provided cost certainty to industry operating within the mill.

=== Newsprint production ===
Historically, Norske Skog Tasman supplied all of New Zealand's newsprint and telephone directory requirements and also provided around thirty percent of Australia's newsprint requirements. Norske Skog Tasman was a wholly owned subsidiary of Norske Skogindustrier ASA, a Norwegian pulp and paper company based in Oslo. The corporation is the world's largest producer of newsprint magazine paper. Annual paper production by Norske Skog Tasman was 300,000 tonnes from the company's two paper machines. A third paper machine was closed in an attempt to remain competitive in the overseas market.

In August 2012, Norske Skog announced that it intended to cut production in the face of declining global and regional demand for newsprint. The company stated that it was currently exporting two thirds of its annual production to Asia, but that low newsprint prices, unfavourable exchange rates and oversupply to the Asian region has made this market unprofitable.

On 9 June 2021 Norske Skog announced the paper mill that produces newsprint would close at the end of that month, with the loss of 160 jobs. The closure was a result of a decline in demand for newsprint, the mill's only product. The Norske Skog Tasman Mill closed on 29 June 2021.

== Kraft pulp production ==
Currently Oji Fibre Solutions process approximately 1.25 million cubic metres of wood annually, converting it into specialty bleached and unbleached pulp for use in the manufacture of paper, tissue and building products. Forty percent is subsequently sold to customers in New Zealand, primarily Norske Skog.

Essity also purchases pulp from Oji Fibre Solutions for manufacture of base paper for their brands Purex and Libra, among others.

The balance of production from both Norske Skog and Oji Fibre Solutions is exported throughout Asia and Oceania earning export income of $224 million.

== Tissue paper production ==
In 2014, a major expansion of the SCA Kawerau tissue paper production site was officially opened. The SCA Group was split into two companies in 2017, with Essity taking the hygiene products. In August 2022, an industrial dispute led to 145 workers being locked out by Essity, causing concern about the supply of toilet paper, because the plant is the only domestic producer of toilet tissue.

== See also ==
- Tarawera River
