= Edgecumbe =

Town in Bay of Plenty Region, New Zealand

- Minor urban area
- Interactive map of Edgecumbe
- Coordinates: 37°58.5′S 176°49.5′E
- Country: New Zealand
- Region: Bay of Plenty
- Territorial authority: Whakatāne District
- Ward: Rangitāiki General Ward
- Community: Rangitāiki Community
- Electorates: East Cape; Waiariki (Māori)

Government
  - Territorial authority: Whakatāne District Council
  - Regional council: Bay of Plenty Regional Council
  - Mayor of Whakatāne: Nándor Tánczos
  - East Cape MP: Dana Kirkpatrick
  - Waiariki MP: Rawiri Waititi

Area
  - Total: 2.01 km^{2} (0.78 sq mi)

Population (June 2025)
  - Total: 1,890
  - Density: 940/km^{2} (2,440/sq mi)
- Postcode(s): 3120

Edgecumbe is a town in the Bay of Plenty Region of the North Island of New Zealand, 15 kilometres (9.3 mi) to the west of Whakatāne and 8 kilometres (5.0 mi) south of the Bay's coast.

It is the main service town for the agricultural region surrounding the plains of the Rangitaiki River, which flows through the town.

State Highway 2 and the Tāneatua Branch railway line (disused) pass through the town.

The Edgecumbe Dairy Factory, established in 1915, employs 358 people, roughly a fifth of Edgecumbe's total population.

== Etymology ==
Edgecumbe was originally named Rangitaiki but the name was changed to avoid confusion with Rangitaiki near Taupo. The name of the town was taken from the nearby Mount Edgecumbe.

== History ==
In 1987 a large earthquake centred on Edgecumbe shook the Bay of Plenty, causing widespread damage and causing much of the population to leave Edgecumbe.

In July 2004, May 2005 and April 2017, the town experienced heavy flooding that ruined many homes. In the 2005 flood, the river swelled to within 5 cm of breaching the flood banks that had been put in place seven years prior.

=== 1987 Edgecumbe earthquake ===
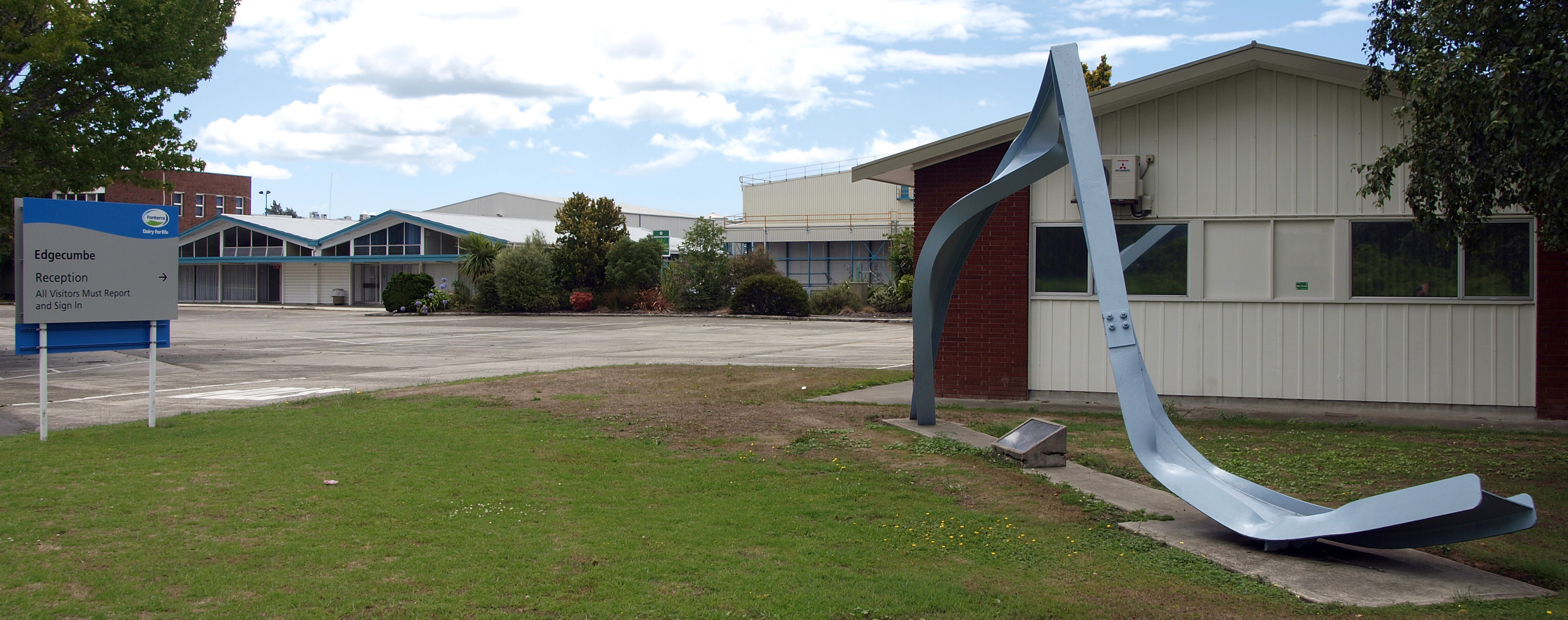
1987 Earthquake memorial (on right).

The earthquake was a major turning point in the history of Edgecumbe. It measured 6.3 on the Richter magnitude scale and struck the Bay of Plenty region of New Zealand on 2 March 1987, just after 1.42 pm. The earthquake was very shallow, being centred approximately 8 km from the Earth's surface. The earthquake was one of the most damaging New Zealand's North Island has experienced in recent decades, with approximately 50% of the houses in Edgecumbe being damaged by the quake. There was extensive damage to a local milk factory, with large storage tanks toppled. Kawerau was another nearby town that suffered damage and Whakatāne was also badly shaken. An 80-tonne New Zealand Railways DC class locomotive was thrown onto its side.

The earthquake caused no fatalities.

However, one person died at the time as a result of a heart attack, possibly due to the quake. A foreshock just minutes before had cut the power supply and many people had moved away from heavy machinery and out of their houses. The largest aftershock was measured at 5.2 and struck at 1.52 pm.

A crack 7 kilometres (4.3 mi) long opened in the Rangitaiki Plains near Edgecumbe, as a result of the earthquake. It is now known as the 'Edgecumbe Fault'. At one point, the land close to the fault dropped 2 metres (6.6 ft).

The epicentre of the quake was approximately 2.24 kilometres (1.39 mi) south-south-east of the town of Matatā, or 15 kilometres (9.3 mi) north-north-west of Edgecumbe. The intense ground-shaking caused by the earthquake led to a large number of ground surface failures, including sand boils, ridge-top shatters and debris avalanches on steeper slopes. Because of the earthquake, many people left and therefore Edgecumbe's population dropped considerably. Edgecumbe is slowly recovering as it has increased by 21 in the years 2006 to 2013, possibly due to many kiwifruit orchards being affected by PSA.

=== 2017 Edgecumbe flood ===
In April 2017, remnants of Cyclone Debbie caused heavy rainfall in the region. At 8:30 am on April 6, water from the Rangitaiki River breached a stopbank next to Edgecumbe, causing widespread flooding across the township. A state of emergency was declared for the Whakatāne District, and around 2000 people were evacuated to Kawerau and Whakatāne. More than 300 homes were damaged, with some becoming uninhabitable.

There were no deaths due to the flood, yet, over 50 percent of people there were highly affected by it.

The largest animal rescue in New Zealand history was recorded during the aftermath of the flood. Approximately 1000 animals were rescued by an SPCA led operation, with support from local civil defence rescue teams and veterinarians from Massey University. The event highlighted a significant gap in animal welfare emergency management capability in New Zealand.

== Demographics ==
Edgecumbe is described by Stats NZ as a small urban area, and covers 2.01 km^{2} (0.78 sq mi). It had an estimated population of 1,890 as of June 2025, with a population density of 940 people per km^{2}.

Historical population
Year	Pop.	±% p.a.
2006	1,626	—
2013	1,638	+0.11%
2018	1,644	+0.07%
2023	1,800	+1.83%

Edgecumbe had a population of 1,800 in the 2023 New Zealand census, an increase of 156 people (9.5%) since the 2018 census, and an increase of 162 people (9.9%) since the 2013 census. There were 906 males, 885 females, and 6 people of other genders in 618 dwellings. 2.5% of people identified as LGBTIQ+. The median age was 34.9 years (compared with 38.1 years nationally). There were 423 people (23.5%) aged under 15 years, 342 (19.0%) aged 15 to 29, 744 (41.3%) aged 30 to 64, and 294 (16.3%) aged 65 or older.

People could identify as more than one ethnicity. The results were 70.7% European (Pākehā), 46.0% Māori, 4.3% Pasifika, 3.7% Asian, and 1.7% other, which includes people giving their ethnicity as "New Zealander". English was spoken by 96.3%, Māori by 11.3%, Samoan by 0.2%, and other languages by 4.3%. No language could be spoken by 3.0% (e.g. too young to talk). New Zealand Sign Language was known by 0.3%. The percentage of people born overseas was 10.7, compared with 28.8% nationally.

Religious affiliations were 23.0% Christian, 0.3% Hindu, 0.2% Islam, 4.7% Māori religious beliefs, 0.5% Buddhist, 0.3% New Age, and 1.3% other religions. People who answered that they had no religion were 61.0%, and 8.8% of people did not answer the census question.

Of those at least 15 years old, 150 (10.9%) people had a bachelor's or higher degree, 828 (60.1%) had a post-high school certificate or diploma, and 402 (29.2%) people exclusively held high school qualifications. The median income was $37,300, compared with $41,500 nationally. 72 people (5.2%) earned over $100,000 compared to 12.1% nationally. The employment status of those at least 15 was 702 (51.0%) full-time, 177 (12.9%) part-time, and 69 (5.0%) unemployed.

== Geography ==
Edgecumbe is located inland from the coast on the end of the fertile Rangitaiki Plains. The nearby beach is part of Maketu. The volcanic cone of Mount Edgecumbe, 15 kilometres to the south and close to the town of Kawerau, is visible from Edgecumbe.

=== Climate ===
Climate data for Edgecumbe (1971–2000)
Month	Jan	Feb	Mar	Apr	May	Jun	Jul	Aug	Sep	Oct	Nov	Dec	Year
Mean daily maximum °C (°F)	23.9 (75.0)	24.1 (75.4)	22.4 (72.3)	20.2 (68.4)	17.5 (63.5)	14.9 (58.8)	14.6 (58.3)	15.3 (59.5)	16.9 (62.4)	18.6 (65.5)	20.3 (68.5)	22.1 (71.8)	19.2 (66.6)
Daily mean °C (°F)	18.9 (66.0)	19.2 (66.6)	17.5 (63.5)	14.9 (58.8)	12.2 (54.0)	9.9 (49.8)	9.4 (48.9)	10.1 (50.2)	11.7 (53.1)	13.6 (56.5)	15.4 (59.7)	17.3 (63.1)	14.2 (57.5)
Mean daily minimum °C (°F)	13.9 (57.0)	14.2 (57.6)	12.6 (54.7)	9.7 (49.5)	6.9 (44.4)	4.9 (40.8)	4.3 (39.7)	4.9 (40.8)	6.5 (43.7)	8.5 (47.3)	10.5 (50.9)	12.4 (54.3)	9.1 (48.4)
Average rainfall mm (inches)	91.7 (3.61)	89.2 (3.51)	149.2 (5.87)	95.1 (3.74)	114.8 (4.52)	170.9 (6.73)	119.6 (4.71)	120.7 (4.75)	119.1 (4.69)	96.8 (3.81)	74.5 (2.93)	123.9 (4.88)	1,365.5 (53.75)
Source: NIWA

== Clubs and organisations ==
The Association Football Club Plains Rangers AFC is based at the Edgecumbe Domain, along with rugby and hockey.

The Edgecumbe Volunteer Fire Brigade is located on SH2 and services the township and surrounding area.

The town has a local rugby club, and a Kart Sport track.

== Education ==
Edgecumbe School is a state primary school for Year 1 to 8 students, with a roll of 163. It opened in a barn in 1914 and moved to a new building in 1916. Then called Riverslea School, it became Edgecumbe Primary School in 1925, and moved to its current site in 1926.

Rangitaiki College is a state high school for Year 9 to 13 students, with a roll of 129. It opened in 1962 as Edgecumbe College.

Both schools are co-educational. Rolls are as of July 2026.

== Notable people ==
- Eve Rimmer, paraplegic athlete
