= East Coast Main Trunk =

Railway in New Zealand running between Hamilton and Kawerau

Overview
- Owner: KiwiRail (tracks); New Zealand Railways Corporation (land)
- Locale: North Island, New Zealand
- Termini: Hamilton, Waikato; Kawerau, Bay of Plenty

Service
- Type: Main line
- System: New Zealand railway network
- Operator(s): KiwiRail

Technical
- Track gauge: 1,067 mm (3 ft 6 in)
Route map
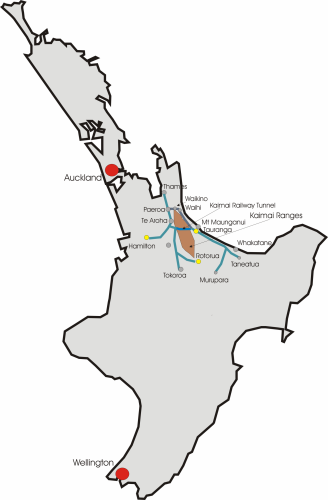

The current route is shown in red, with the former deviation in blue.

The East Coast Main Trunk (ECMT) is a railway line in the North Island of New Zealand, originally running between Hamilton and Taneatua via Tauranga, connecting the Waikato with the Bay of Plenty. The ECMT now runs between Hamilton and Kawerau, with a branch line to Taneatua from the junction at Hawkens. The line is built to narrow gauge of 1,067 mm (3 ft 6 in), the uniform gauge in New Zealand. It was known as the East Coast Main Trunk Railway until 2011, when the word "Railway" was dropped.

== History ==
=== Construction ===
In 1880, the North Island Main Trunk railway had reached Frankton, Hamilton, from Auckland. From there, it was delayed by construction of the original Waikato River bridge (now carrying road traffic as part of Claudelands Road), before the line made its way to Morrinsville in October 1884, Te Aroha in March 1886 and Paeroa in 1898. There were also minor delays, such as in the delivery of totara sleepers. The route to Waihi through the Karangahake Gorge was surveyed in the next few years with construction starting in 1900, with three bridges, including a road-rail bridge and a kilometre-long tunnel, which has a 1:50 grade and took three years to build, being completed in 1904. The line between Paeroa and Waihi opened in November 1905. Surveys were undertaken for the route beyond Waihi in 1907 and construction started in March 1912, but was suspended in November of the same year. The work started again in 1914, but was suspended again in March 1917 because of a shortage of staff due to World War I. The works started again in 1918, and the railway through the Athenree Gorge opened to Tahawai in 1927 and Tauranga in March 1927. The remaining length of line to Te Puke and Taneatua opened in 1928, and the Taneatua Express started in 1929.

=== Original intention ===
Originally in the 1910s and 1920s, the East Coast Main Trunk line was to run from Pokeno to Gisborne via Paeroa, Tauranga, Opotiki and through the Waioeka Gorge, connecting with the Moutohora Branch to Gisborne; creating a link from the isolated Gisborne Section line to Auckland via the Bay of Plenty. This followed on from an original proposal to link Gisborne with Auckland with a line via Rotorua, with a Gisborne-Rotorua line from Makaraka to Mōtū of about 37 miles (60 km) being authorised by the Railways Authorisation Act, 1904. Gisborne was subsequently linked to the south with Wellington via Wairoa and Palmerston North by the Palmerston North - Gisborne Line in 1942.

Work began on extending the line from the Taneatua Branch to Opotiki in March 1928 and on building the Paeroa–Pokeno Line in 1938, when the Minister of Public Works Bob Semple on 28 January turned the first sod it was said that the proposed 29 mi (47 km) line would shorten the distance from Auckland to towns on the ECMT by nearly 50 mi (80 km). The Kaimai Tunnel later cut the distance by about 32 mi (51 km).

Due to two world wars, an economic depression, and an influenza epidemic, the full railway was never completed. In June 1928, 250 men employed by the Public Works Department (many living in government houses or huts) were dismissed, to be replaced by NZR staff. As late as 1939 £45,000 was provided for extension from Taneatua to Opotiki and a route pegged out as far as a proposed Waimana railway station.

Several routes for the link from the Moutohora Branch to the Taneatua Branch were surveyed (20 routes by 1920), but the expense of a line descending to the Bay of Plenty could not be justified (see Moutohora Branch).

=== Kaimai Tunnel deviation ===
The Kaimai Tunnel runs for 8,896 m under the Kaimai Ranges. Construction started from both sides of the range in 1969: the headings met in 1976 and the tunnel opened on 12 September 1978, at which time it became the longest tunnel in the Southern Hemisphere. It was eclipsed by the 13,400 m No. 4 tunnel of the Hex River Tunnels system in 1989.

=== Closure of the northern route ===
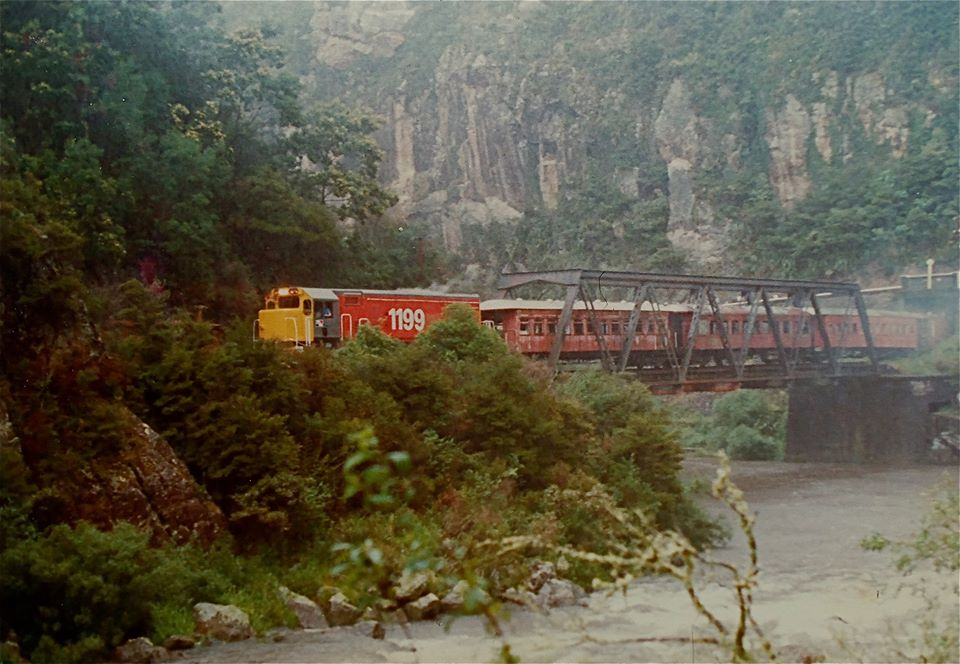
DBR1199 hauling a train in Karangahake Gorge, 1980, on the former route

After the opening of the Kaimai Tunnel, the route through the Karangahake Gorge to the eastern junction closed in 1978 and was dismantled from 1980 to 1983. The railway from Morrinsville to Paeroa stayed open and continued (via the Thames Branch) to Thames until closure in 1991 and lifting between Waitoa and Thames in 1996/1997. The 11 km section from Morrinsville to Waitoa reopened in 2004 to serve the Fonterra dairy factory at Waitoa. The rail bridge at Te Aroha is now a walkway over the Waihou River; the route from the tunnel to Waikino through the Karangahake Gorge is now a walkway; from Waikino to Waihi the Goldfields Railway heritage line preserves the old railway, and State Highway 2 runs through the Athrenee Gorge along part of the original rail alignment. Along parts of State Highway 2, parts of the old railbed, bridge piers and abutments are still visible. Old bridges are also extant at Waitoa, Te Aroha, Karangahake, Waikino and Aongatete. Near Apata, the old and newer bridges of both routes can be seen from the highway spanning the Wainui Stream.

There were proposals to keep the 14.3km Apata - Katikati section of the railway open as a branch line to carry kiwifruit exports to the Port of Tauranga. The proposal gained the support of Associate Minister of Railways, Aussie Malcolm, who announced on 26 June 1981 that the section would be retained. In July 1981 New Zealand Railways began legal work to re-open the line as an industrial line. There was strong opposition to reopening the line though. The local county council and the chamber of commerce opposed reopening, as that would mean keeping two road overbridges they were seeking to eliminate to improve roads in the area. The chamber of commerce described the reopening as an election bribe in the lead-up to the 1981 general election and it was opposed by the Labour Party. In the end, deregulation of land transport and the creation of the New Zealand Railways Corporation in 1982 led to the re-evaluation of the business proposal to reopen the line, resulting in the decision to lift the remaining section on 18 June 1982. On 30 July 1982, the National Union of Railwaymen announced that its members had banned the lifting of the line, which proceeded anyway and was completed by 1983.

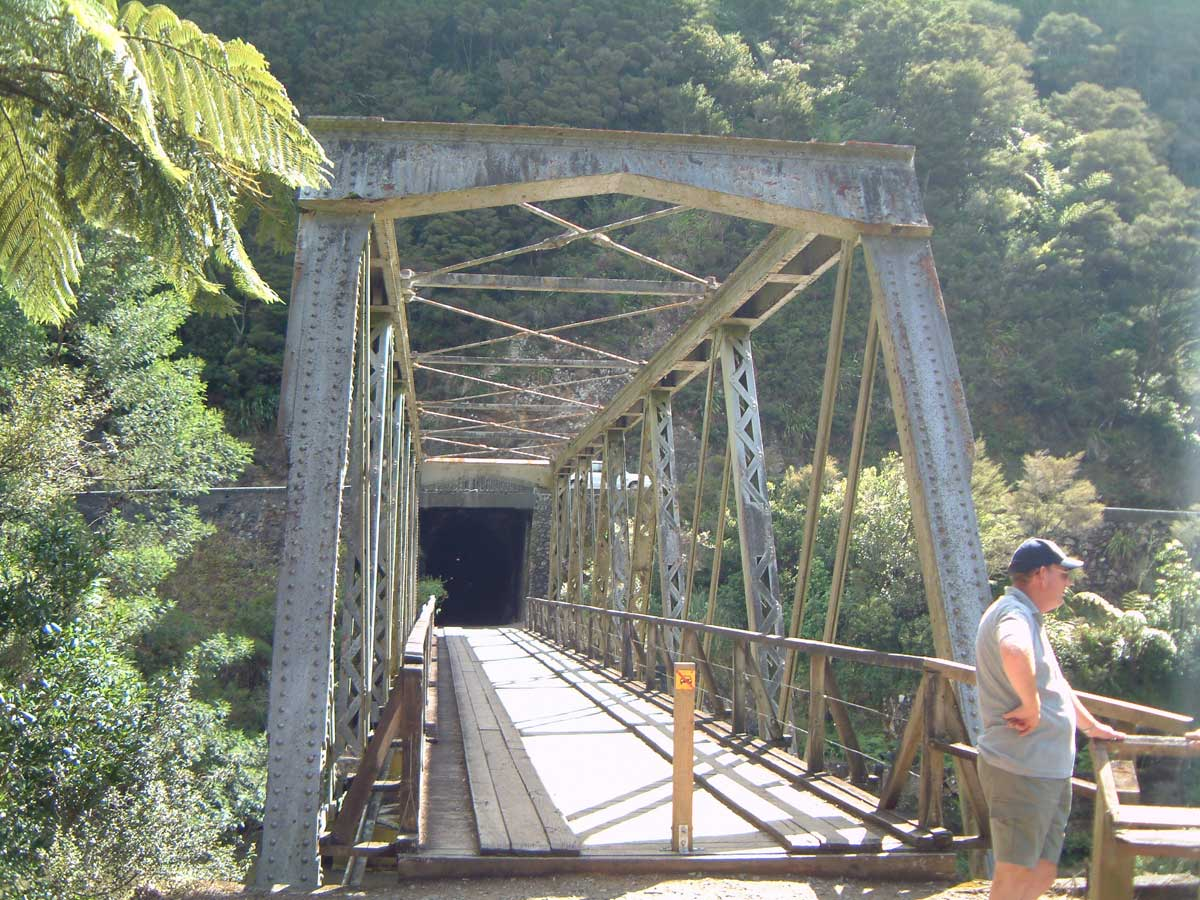
Former ECMT rail bridge in Karangahake Gorge. The bridge is now part of a public walkway and the Hauraki Rail Trail cycleway.

== Electrification ==
A paper written in 2008 for the then railway infrastructure owner ONTRACK (now KiwiRail Network) investigated the possibility of electrifying the East Coast Main Trunk from Hamilton to Tauranga. In May 2021, KiwiRail, Beca and Systra published the North Island Electrification Study, which put the expected estimate for electrification of the ECMT from Hamilton to Mt Maunganui at $426m.

== Passenger services ==
=== Taneatua Express ===
When the line opened to its terminus at Taneatua, the Taneatua Express ran from Auckland. The service took 12 hours, later reduced to 10½ hours, and ran two or three times weekly. The last train ran on 7 February 1959, and was replaced by a railcar service as far as Te Puke, due to negligible traffic to Taneatua. The railway struggled to compete with private cars and the service was withdrawn on 11 September 1967. Other than special excursions, there were no passenger services until 1991.

=== Kaimai Express ===
In 1991, the Kaimai Express started and ran to Tauranga. Along with the Geyserland Express it used the Silver Fern railcars that had been used on the North Island Main Trunk line. The first train ran on 9 December 1991, running a morning service from Tauranga to Auckland and afternoon service from Auckland to Tauranga, taking 3½ hours. The times changed in 2000 to enable the introduction of the Waikato Connection commuter service between Hamilton and Auckland. In 2001, it was announced that the service was too uneconomic to continue, and the last service was on 7 October 2001.

== Freight ==
The ECMT carries 52% of freight between Waikato and Bay of Plenty and is one of Kiwi Rail's most profitable lines. In 2018 163 trains a week passed under Hamilton, 90 of them on weekday nights, or evenings, 37 at weekends and 36 between 8am and 5pm, Monday to Friday. The line is at 70% capacity and growing. By 2022 the average had increased slightly to 38 trains a day.

To provide extra capacity crossing loops were added about 2012 at Ruakura, Eureka, Motumaoho, Tamihana and Apata. There are 11 passing loops between Hamilton and Tauranga, 7 of them 900 m (3,000 ft) long and 4 shorter. In 2020 a new container terminal at Kawerau was announced. Delays around land transfers means the project as of late 2023 has yet to start construction.

== Connecting lines ==
| Line Name | Date Opened | Date Closed | ECMT Junction | Terminus | Length | Notes |
|---|---|---|---|---|---|---|
| North Island Main Trunk | 19 December 1877 | Open | Frankton Junction | Auckland/Wellington | 680 km | |
| Cambridge Branch | 8 October 1884 | Open | Ruakura Junction | Hautapu | 14.8 km | Hautapu-Cambridge section (4.5 km) closed and lifted 1999. |
| Rotorua Branch | 8 March 1886 | 7 October 2001 | Morrinsville Junction | Rotorua | 110 km | Built by Thames Valley and Rotorua Railway Co. First 24.6 km added to ECMT on opening of Kaimai Deviation, 1978. Section between Waharoa and Kinleith became Kinleith Branch in 1978, with Rotorua Branch becoming secondary branch section between Putaruru and Rotorua. Last 2 km of Rotorua Branch closed and lifted in 1989 with station relocated to Koutu. Rotorua Branch mothballed 2002. |
| Waitoa Branch | 1 March 1886 | Open | Morrinsvillle Junction | Waitoa | 10 km | Formerly part of the Thames Branch 1886-1928 & 1978-1991, Part of ECMT 1928-1978. |
| Thames Branch | 19 December 1898 | 1991 | Paeroa Junction | Thames North | 33 km | Morrinsvillle-Thames 70 km 1883-1928 & 1978-1991, Paeroa Junction-Thames North 33 km 1928-1978. Lifted beyond Waitoa 1995. |
| Mount Maunganui Branch | 16 October 1913 | Open | Te Maunga Junction | Mount Maunganui | 7.5 km | Portage line for Public Works Dept 1913-1928. Reopened for RNZAF 1942-1946. Reopened by NZR 1955. |
| Kawerau Branch | 26 October 1953 | Open | Hawkens Junction | Kawerau | 14 km | Incorporated into ECMT 1978. |
| Taneatua Branch | 2 September 1928 | Mothballed | Hawkens Junction | Taneatua | 25 km | Formerly eastern end of ECMT until 1978. |

== Connecting private railways ==
| Junction Station | Date Opened | Date Closed | Owner | Notes |
|---|---|---|---|---|
| Morrinsville | 1 March 1886 | Open | Thames Valley and Rotorua Railway Co. | Purchased by the Government in 1886 (became Rotorua Branch.) |
| Waikino | | 1925 | Kauri Timber Co. | Steam-powered bush tramway to Waitawheta valley |
| Waikino/Waihi | 1897 | 1952 | Waihi Gold Mining Company | 2'9" steam railway between Waikino and Waihi, extensive network in Waihi Borough. |
| Waihi | 1899 | 1921 | Waihi Timber Company | Steam powered bush tram to Waimata valley and Mataora Valley |
| Omokoroa | 1912 | 1947 | Whakamarama Land & Timber Co | Steam powered bush tramway from Omokoroa Point to deep in the Kaimai Ranges. |
| Edgecumbe | 1927 | 1966 | Matahina Tramway Inc | Owned by several sawmillers including WBM, Matahina Forests Ltd, Kauri Sawmills Ltd. |
| Awakeri | 1939 | 2002 | Whakatane Board Mills Ltd / Carter Holt Harvey | 10 km line, later Whakatane Board Mills Line. Operation taken over by Tranz Rail in 1999. Closed and lifted 2002. |
