= Hamilton Central =

Central business district of Hamilton, New Zealand

- Suburb
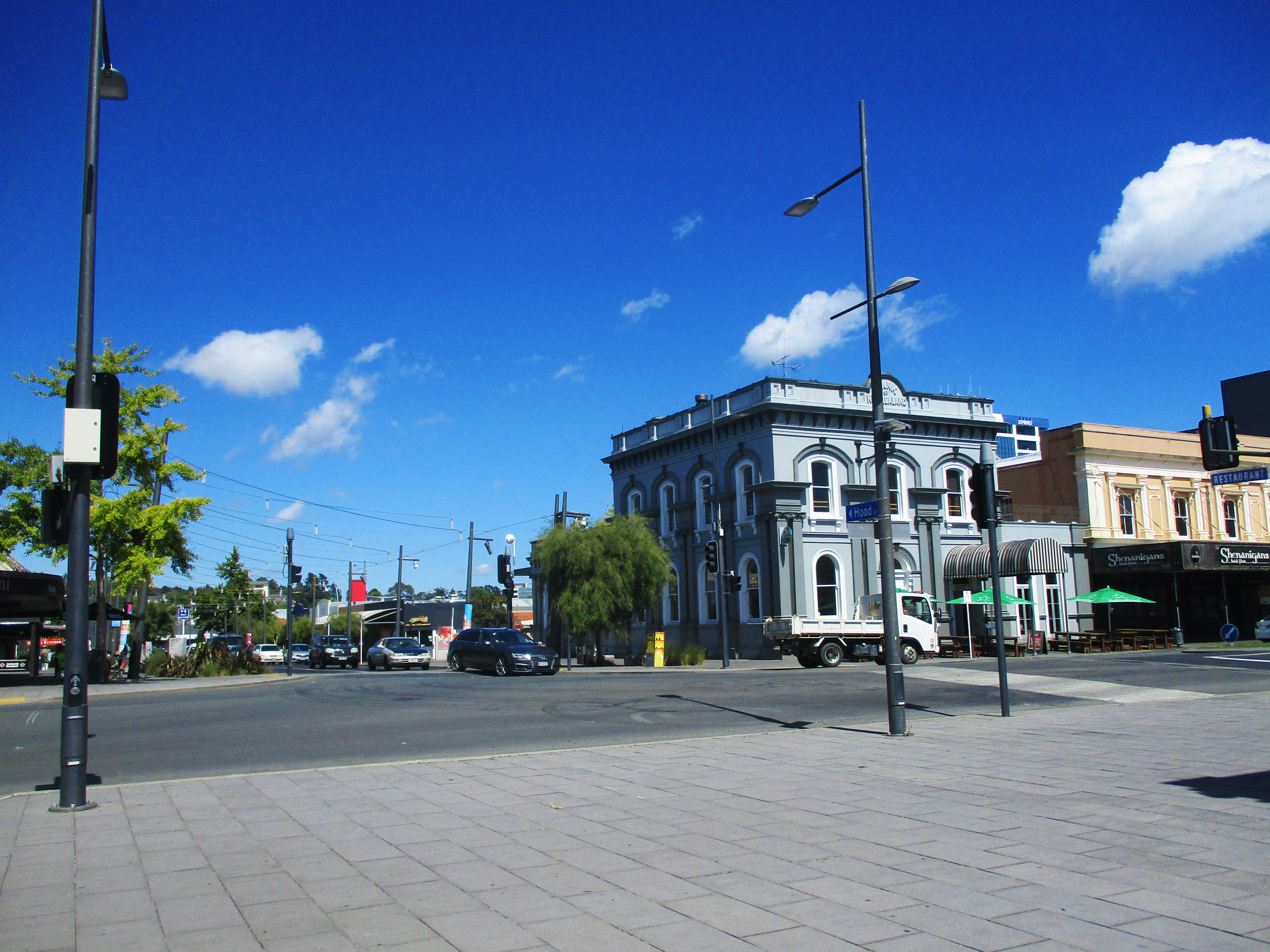
- Corner of Hood Street, with the former Bank of New Zealand building in the background
- Interactive map of Hamilton Central
- Coordinates: 37°47′14.8″S 175°16′56.94″E
- Country: New Zealand
- City: Hamilton, New Zealand
- Local authority: Hamilton City Council
- Electoral ward: West Ward
- Established: 1877

Area
  - Land: 198 ha (490 acres)

Population (June 2025)
  - Total: 2,820
  - Density: 1,420/km^{2} (3,690/sq mi)

| | Hamilton North | Fairfield |
| Frankton | Hamilton Central | Claudelands |
| Hamilton Lake | Hamilton West | Hamilton East |

Hamilton Central is the central business district of Hamilton, New Zealand. It is located on the western banks of the Waikato River.

== Demographics ==
Hamilton Central Business District, called Hamilton Centre by Stats NZ, covers 1.98 km^{2} (0.76 sq mi) and had an estimated population of 2,820 as of June 2025, with a population density of 1,424 people per km^{2}. Hamilton North and Hamilton West are also part of the Central Business District.

Historical population
| Year | Pop. | ±% p.a. |
|---|---|---|
| 2006 | 801 | — |
| 2013 | 1,890 | +13.05% |
| 2018 | 2,337 | +4.34% |
| 2023 | 2,628 | +2.37% |
The 2006 population is for a smaller area of 1.67 km^{2}. Source:

Hamilton Centre had a population of 2,628 in the 2023 New Zealand census, an increase of 291 people (12.5%) since the 2018 census, and an increase of 738 people (39.0%) since the 2013 census. There were 1,299 males, 1,320 females and 15 people of other genders in 1,341 dwellings. 6.5% of people identified as LGBTIQ+. The median age was 34.5 years (compared with 38.1 years nationally). There were 297 people (11.3%) aged under 15 years, 696 (26.5%) aged 15 to 29, 1,302 (49.5%) aged 30 to 64, and 336 (12.8%) aged 65 or older.

People could identify as more than one ethnicity. The results were 56.2% European (Pākehā); 22.0% Māori; 4.5% Pasifika; 27.7% Asian; 3.5% Middle Eastern, Latin American and African New Zealanders (MELAA); and 1.6% other, which includes people giving their ethnicity as "New Zealander". English was spoken by 95.7%, Māori language by 6.3%, Samoan by 0.6%, and other languages by 24.5%. No language could be spoken by 1.8% (e.g. too young to talk). New Zealand Sign Language was known by 0.6%. The percentage of people born overseas was 39.4, compared with 28.8% nationally.

Religious affiliations were 30.4% Christian, 6.8% Hindu, 3.5% Islam, 1.1% Māori religious beliefs, 2.2% Buddhist, 0.9% New Age, and 3.4% other religions. People who answered that they had no religion were 45.2%, and 6.6% of people did not answer the census question.

Of those at least 15 years old, 879 (37.7%) people had a bachelor's or higher degree, 987 (42.3%) had a post-high school certificate or diploma, and 465 (19.9%) people exclusively held high school qualifications. The median income was $44,000, compared with $41,500 nationally. 276 people (11.8%) earned over $100,000 compared to 12.1% nationally. The employment status of those at least 15 was that 1,263 (54.2%) people were employed full-time, 276 (11.8%) were part-time, and 102 (4.4%) were unemployed.

Individual statistical areas
| Name | Area (km^{2}) | Population | Density (per km^{2}) | Dwellings | Median age | Median income |
|---|---|---|---|---|---|---|
| Kirikiriroa | 0.56 | 822 | 1,468 | 438 | 32.8 years | $45,300 |
| Hamilton Central | 1.02 | 597 | 585 | 339 | 39.0 years | $43,100 |
| Hamilton West | 0.40 | 1,209 | 3,023 | 564 | 33.9 years | $43,700 |
| New Zealand | | | | | 38.1 years | $41,500 |

== Features of Hamilton Central ==
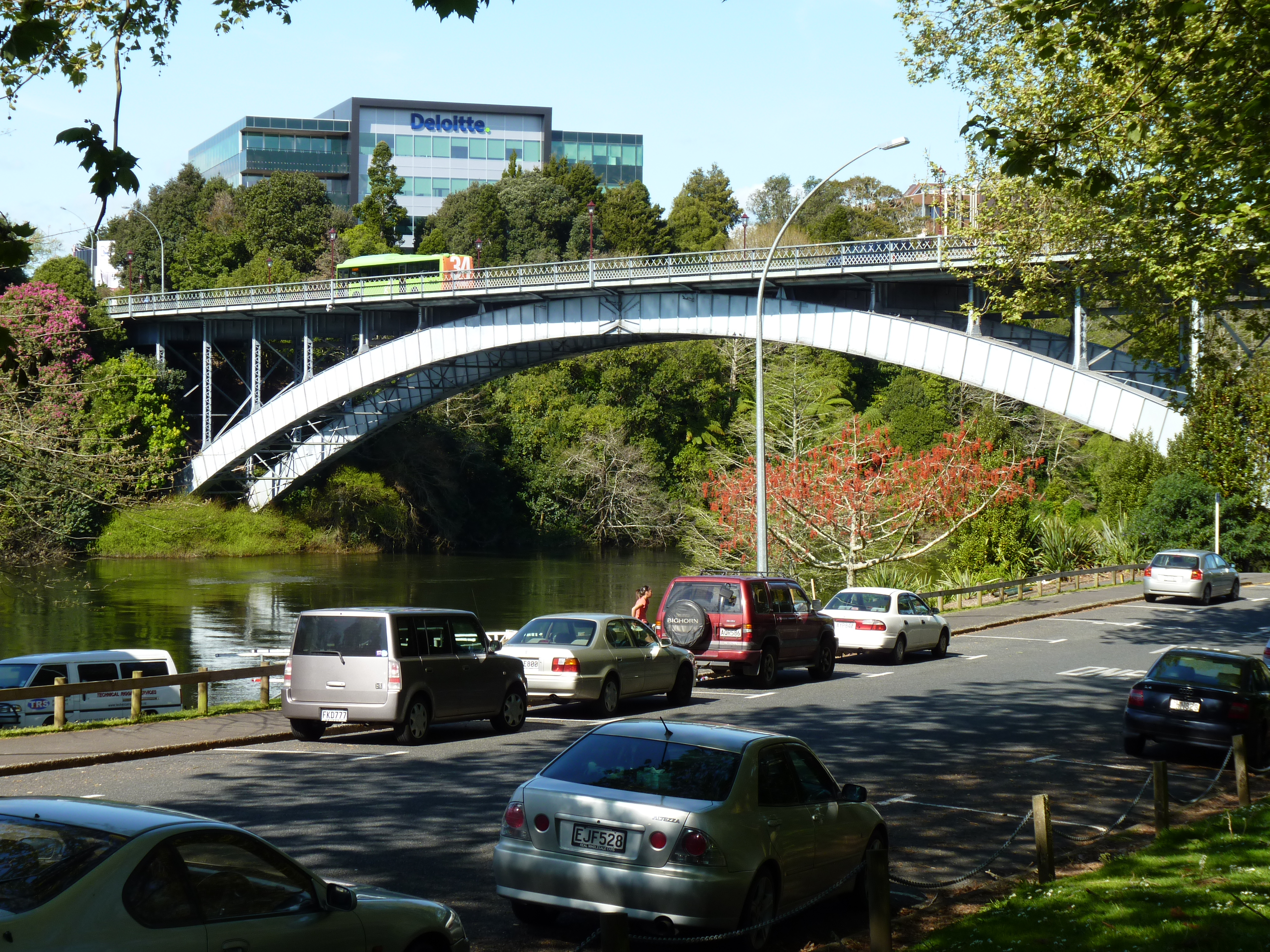
Victoria Bridge across the Waikato River.

=== Victoria Street ===
Victoria Street, named after Queen Victoria, is the main street of Hamilton running adjacent to the Waikato River. It stretches from Victoria Bridge to beyond the Fairfield Bridge, but the commercial section ends before Whitiora Bridge. 33 of the city's 105 heritage sites are located on the street. Lonely Planet guide states that Hamilton's "main street has sprouted a sophisticated and vibrant stretch of bars and eateries that on the weekend at least leave Auckland's Viaduct Harbour for dead in the boozy fun stakes." Centre Place is a 1985 shopping mall.

=== Garden Place ===
Further along Victoria Street is the pedestrian mall Garden Place. It was carved, after much debate, out of a hill in the late 1930s. The cutting was made through the ridge to allow the formation of Anglesea Street. Later the ridge on the river side of Anglesea Street was bulldozed away, thereby flattening the area for the development of Garden Place and the central CBD around the Hamilton City Council buildings.

The area was initially used as a car park, which was very popular with retailers and shoppers. In 1967, the car park was closed and Garden Place was laid out with grass and trees. A ring road encircled the beautified area, but it was removed in August 1974. The name Garden Place actually refers to the former road, not the grass park area.

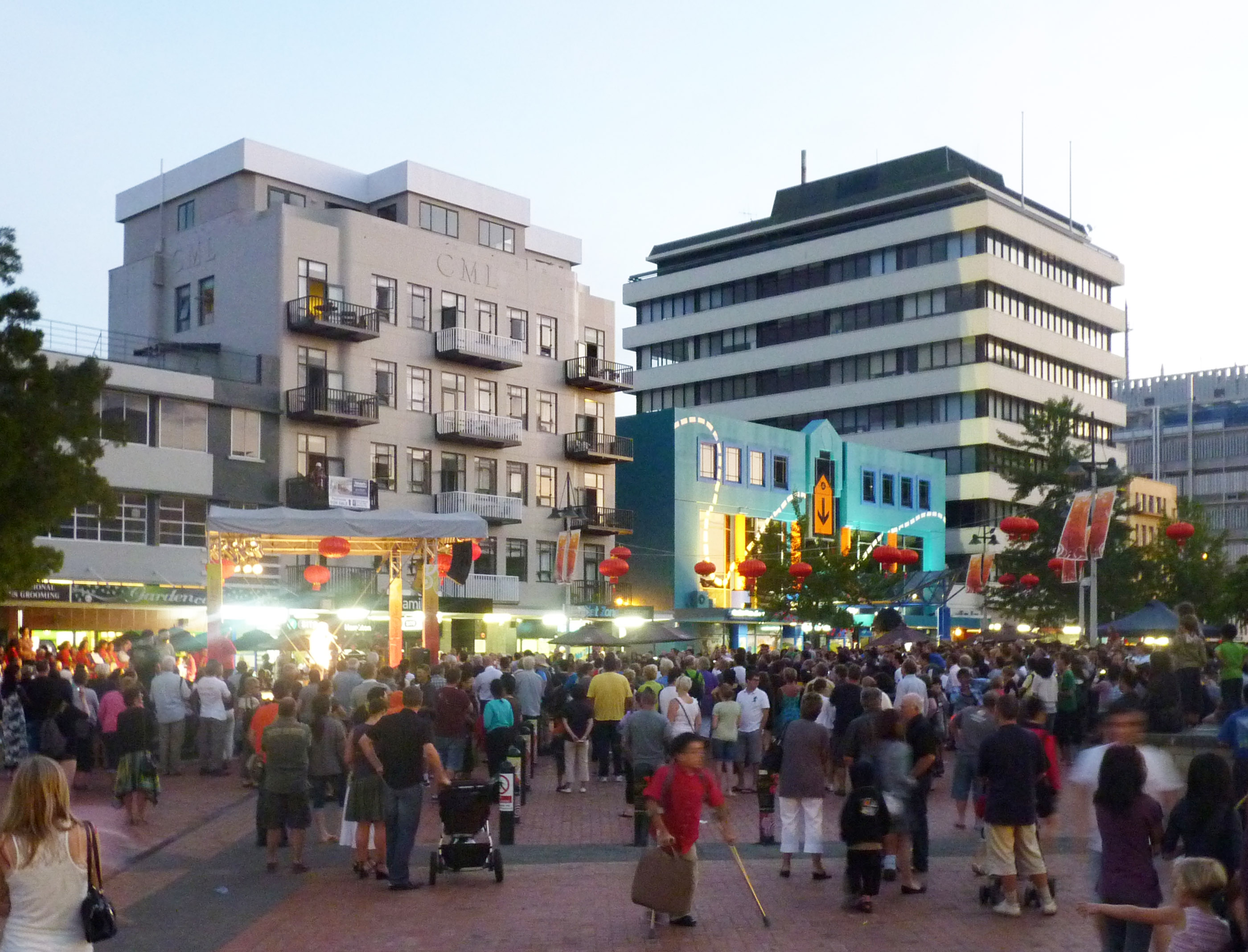
Garden Place

Has a shared drive through, created in 2012, as part of a redesign of the Place.

=== Hood Street Precinct ===
Hood Street is the main centre of Hamilton's hospitality area, as well as south Victoria Street and Alexandra Street. Many of the city's restaurants and bars are located in the Hood Street vicinity. The street is named after English humourist Thomas Hood.

=== Casabella Lane ===
Casabella Lane in Hamilton North is a Spanish themed lane with 21 boutique shops and 9 apartments, built about 2000.

=== Waikato Institute of Technology ===
The Waikato Institute of Technology, marketed as Wintec, is one of New Zealand's largest Institutes of Technology/Polytechnics. Its City Centre campus is located between Anglesea Street and Tristram Street near Civic Square and the Hamilton City Council municipal building.

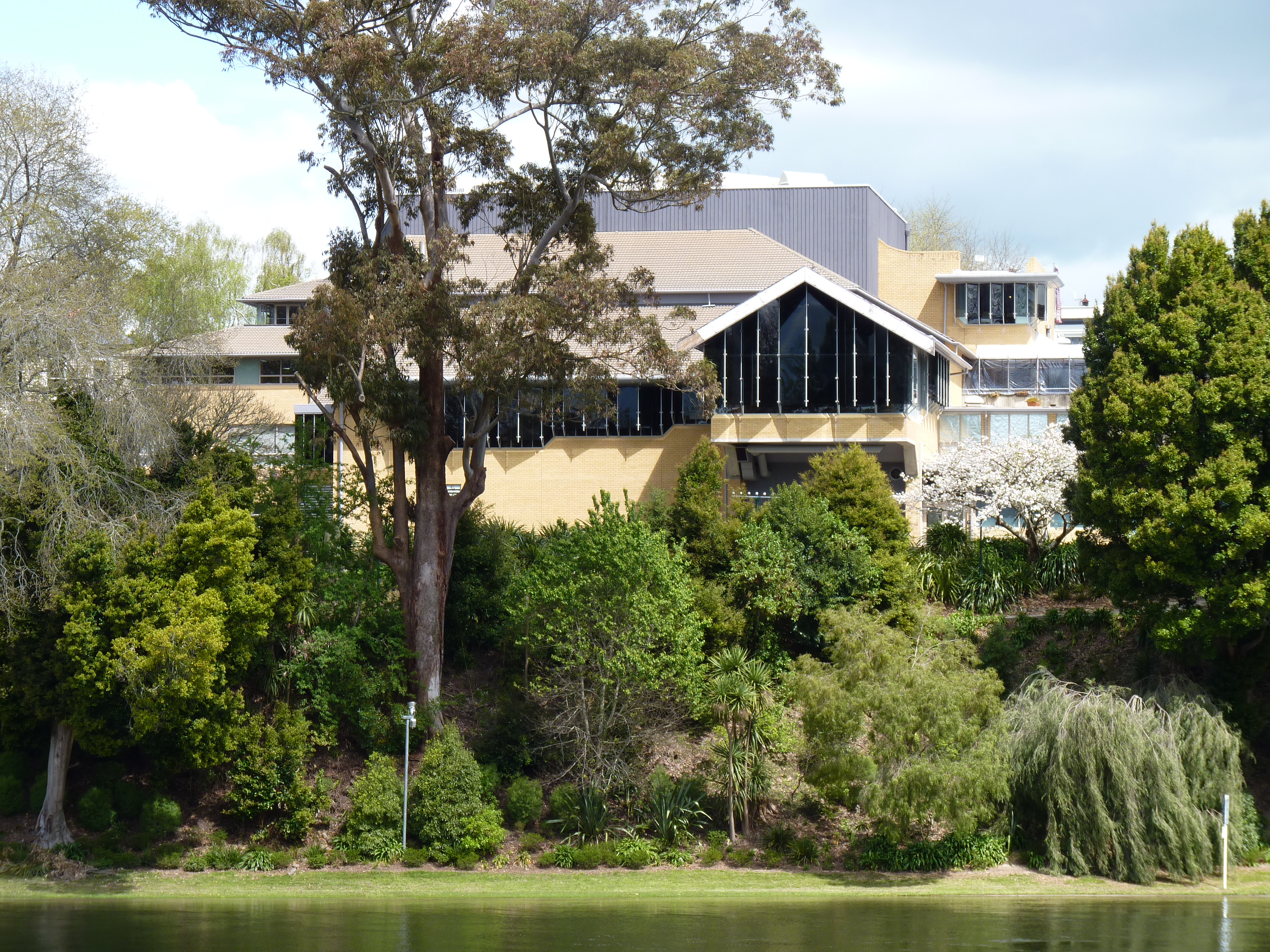
Waikato Museum, viewed from Hamilton East.

=== Founders Theatre ===
Founders Theatre in Hamilton North opened in 1961 but is classified as earthquake-prone and will be demolished.

=== Waikato Museum ===
The Waikato Museum was established in 1987. It was designed by Ivan Mercep, who later designed New Zealand's national museum, Te Papa. The museum has five levels and 13 galleries, and more than 38,000 collection objects, relating to tangata whenua, art, science and social history. Te Winika Gallery features Te Whare Waka o Te Winika, a 200-year-old carved waka taua.

=== The Meteor ===
Located at the corner of Victoria Street and Bridge Street, The Meteor is Hamilton's Black box theatre. The former soft-drink bottling plant and roller-skating rink was converted into a theatre. It also provides facilities on the 1st Floor, suitable for start-up businesses in the creative sector. This Creative Industries Hub known as Soda Inc is an initiative in the cultural development area undertaken by Hamilton City Council in conjunction with Wintec.

=== Clarence Street Theatre ===
Clarence Street Theatre is a 550 capacity theatre with a distinctive De Stijl exterior. The building was originally developed over many years by Hamilton Operatic Society and the original building was known as the Drury Lane Theatre. The current theatre was completed in 1987 by the Society and was acquired by HCC in 1997. In 2015 the theatre was gifted to the Clarence Street Theatre Trust. The venue has hosted countless drama, comedy and smaller concert events.

== Heritage buildings ==
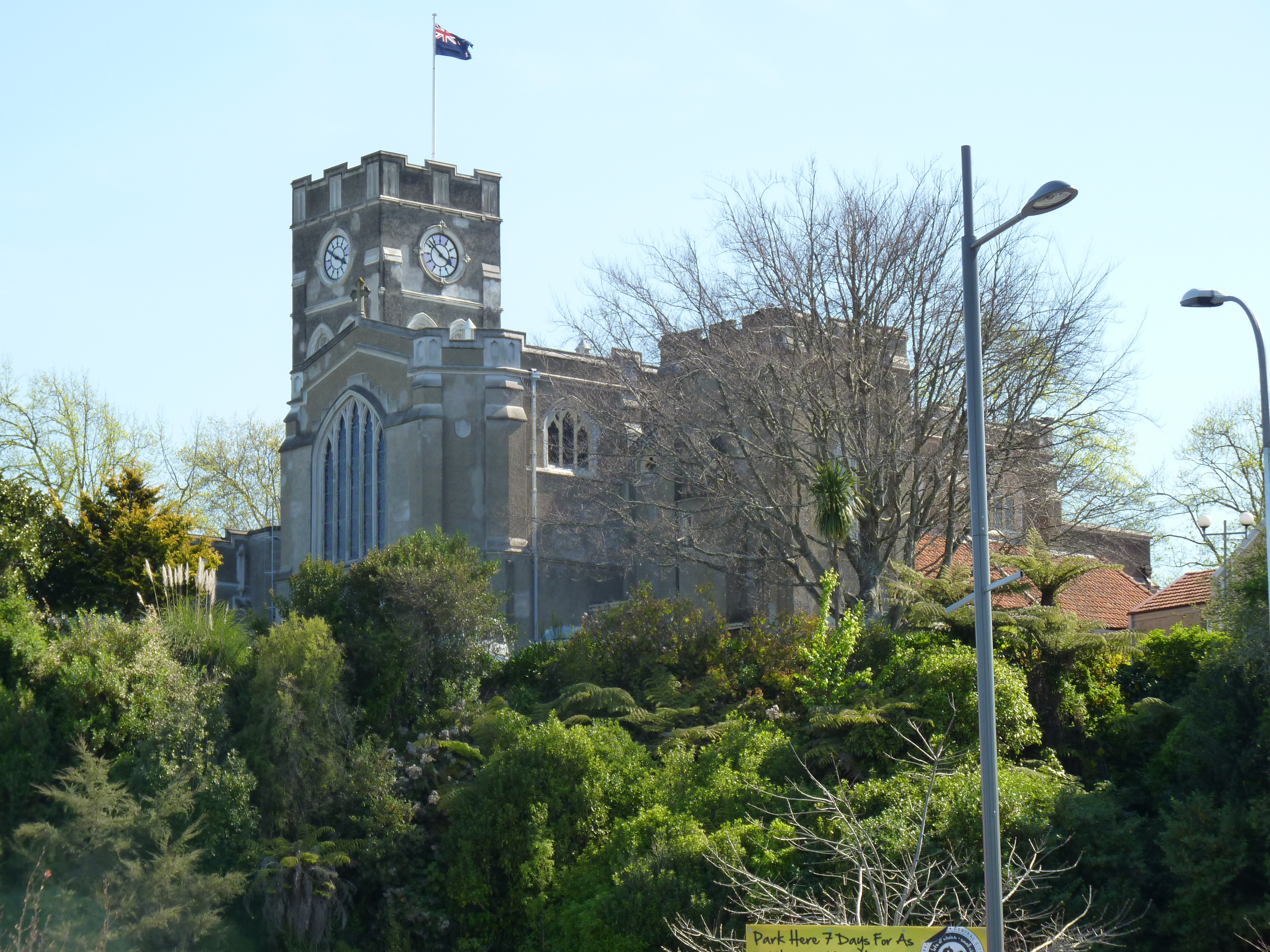
St Peter's Cathedral.

=== St Peter's Cathedral ===
Modelled on a 15th-century Norfolk church, St Peter's Cathedral was constructed with ferro-concrete by Warren and Blechynden of Hamilton. The present St Peter's was completed in 1916 . It is the fourth Anglican church on the site and it serves as the cathedral church for the Bishop and Diocese of Waikato. The church was built on the hill site of the western redoubt built by Australian troops to defend Hamilton from attacks by Kingite Maori during the 1863-4 war.

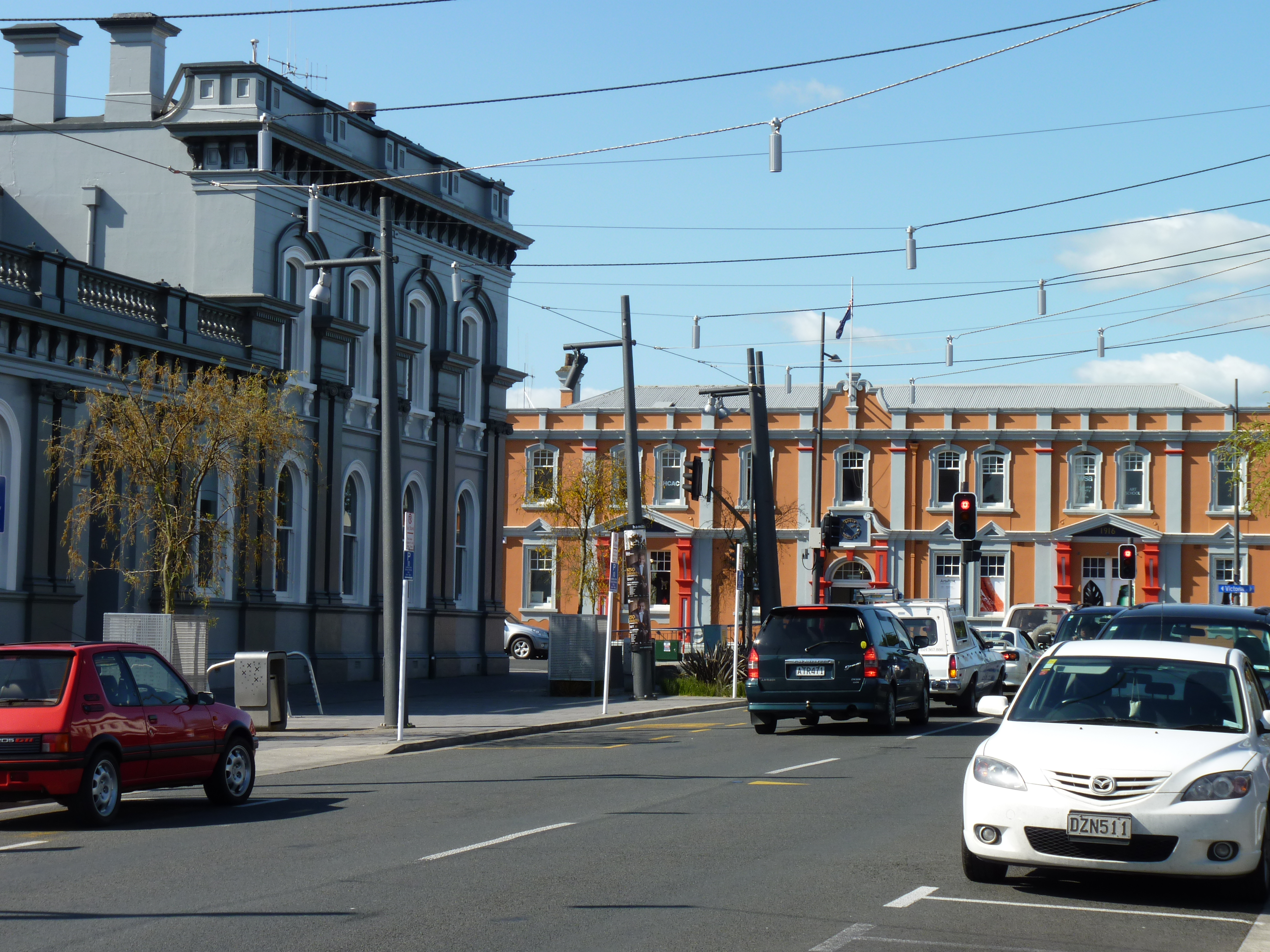
Hood Street – Left: Former Bank of New Zealand Building, Right: Former Post Office Building.

=== ArtsPost / Hamilton Post Office Building ===
Hamilton's Post and Telegraph Office was built in 1901. The building was designed by architect John Campbell, in an Edwardian Baroque style. The building was extended by half in 1916 to meet the demand for more facilities, and remained the central post office until 1940 when its replacement opposite Garden Place opened. For the next 40 years, the building was used for Social Welfare purposes. Various other tenants include the Maori Land Court, local Members of Parliament and a Youth Resource Centre. Hamilton City Council purchased the building in 1992 and restored the building as much as possible to original condition. The renovated building was opened as ArtsPost on 27 June 1998. It was given a Category 2 Heritage listing on 13 December 1990.

=== Hamilton Hotel - Waikato Regional Theatre ===
At 170-186 Victoria Street is the former 1923 Hamilton Hotel, which was given a Category 2 Heritage listing on 5 September 1985. It first opened in winter 1865. From 1874 it was called Gwynne's Hamilton Hotel. The hotel burnt down in 1898 and 1922. The hotel reopened on 7 May 1923, though its small size was criticised, and an extra wing was added in 1925. There were major additions in 1929. The hotel closed in 1980.

The facade of the hotel will be retained, when a 1300-seat $74m Waikato Regional Theatre is built in 2021/22. Part of Hua O Te Atua urupa (burial ground) may remain on the site, but an archaeological assessment failed to precisely locate it.

=== Casino ===
The 1940 building at 346 Victoria Street, which replaced the 1901 post office, was itself replaced in 1990, after which it was converted to Sky City Casino. It was designed by Hamilton architects Edgecumbe and White. It has been much modified, but retains an art deco Lenscrete dome, formed of glass and concrete, and is scheduled as Category A in Hamilton's proposed District Plan.

=== Bank of New Zealand Building ===
The former Bank of New Zealand building was the largest building of its kind in Hamilton when it was constructed in 1875. The two-storeyed building was designed by Edward Mahoney. A single storey was added to the rear extension in 1908 and a single storey extension was added between the original building and the neighbouring premises in 1932.

The Bank of New Zealand left the building in 1986 and it was vacant until it was refurbished in 1994 as The Bank Bar and Brasserie. Its restoration signalled the beginning of a multimillion-dollar redevelopment at the south end of Victoria St.

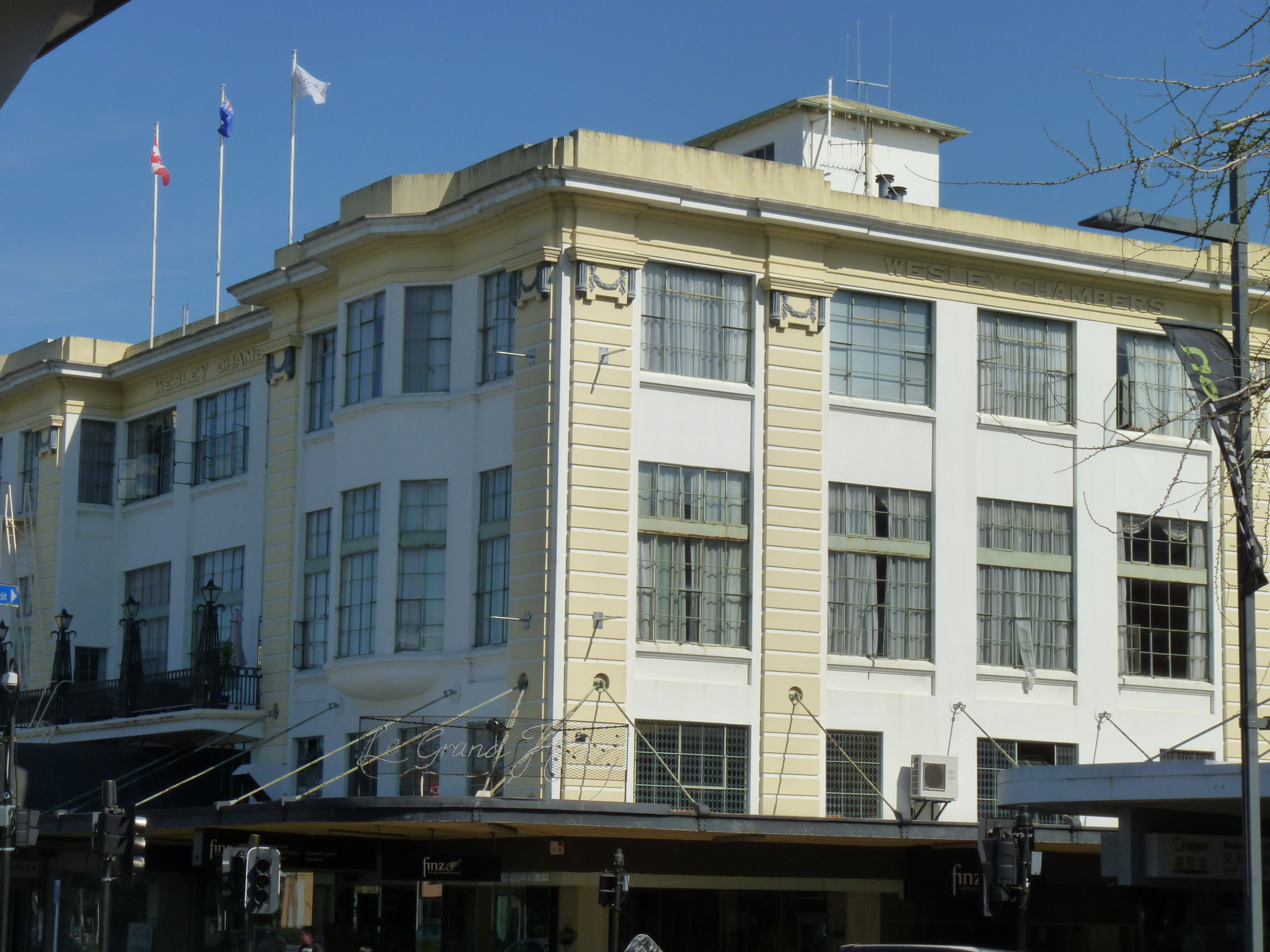
Wesley Chambers, corner of Victoria Street and Collingwood Street.

=== Wesley Chambers ===
Wesley Chambers was the first multistoreyed building in Hamilton made of reinforced concrete and the first to have a lift. The building was designed in the Chicago School style by Frederick Daniell. Wesley Chambers feature Sullivanesque-style windows with central panes flanked by narrower panes, and the unusual wrought iron balconies on two sides of the building.

For most of its history, Wesley Chambers' upper floors were tenanted by some of the city's most prominent professional people including opticians, solicitors, accountants and dentists. In the 1980s and early 1990s, the building was vacant and, in 1993, it was transformed into a boutique hotel, the Le Grand, which became VR Hamilton hotel in 2012 and was offered for sale in 2021.

=== Hamilton Courthouse ===
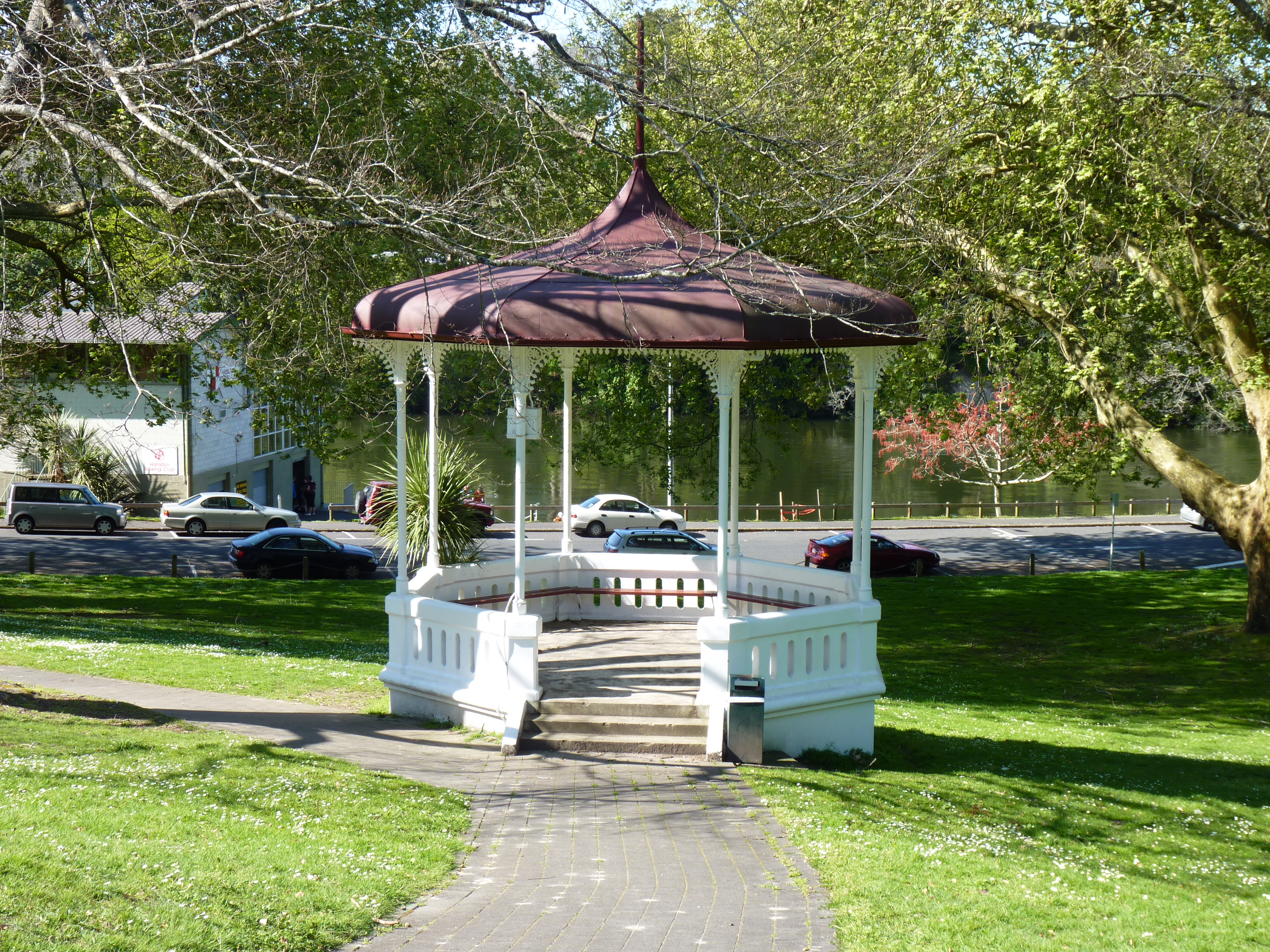
1916 Band Rotunda, Grantham Street

The Hamilton Courthouse, a concrete building on a hill above Anglesea Street, was built in 1931. It had two courtrooms - the Supreme Court and the Magistrates Court. In 1974, arsonists set fire to the building. The Magistrates Court was destroyed and the Supreme Court badly damaged. In 1993, a new court complex was built next to the old building. The old courthouse was unoccupied for a decade but in 2004, a refurbishment project was approved to restore the building as a working courthouse.

=== Municipal Baths ===
A decision was issued in January 2020 to permit demolition of the Municipal Baths at 26 Victoria St. The 1912 classical entrance was demolished in the 1980s, but the bath's relatively early reinforced concrete construction had earned it a Category B Heritage classification. They had been next to the south wing of the old town hall. The remains of the baths were removed in 2022.

=== Band Rotunda ===
Pressure for Hamilton to have a bandstand began in 1913, when the Beautification Society arranged a fundraising fete for a stand to be built near the old town hall at Ferry Bank. However, it wasn't until 1916 that a contract was let for its construction for £364 10s. It was designed by the local architect, Charles Vautier, and completed by July 1916. It was given a Category 2 Heritage listing on 5 September 1985.

== Public art and statues ==
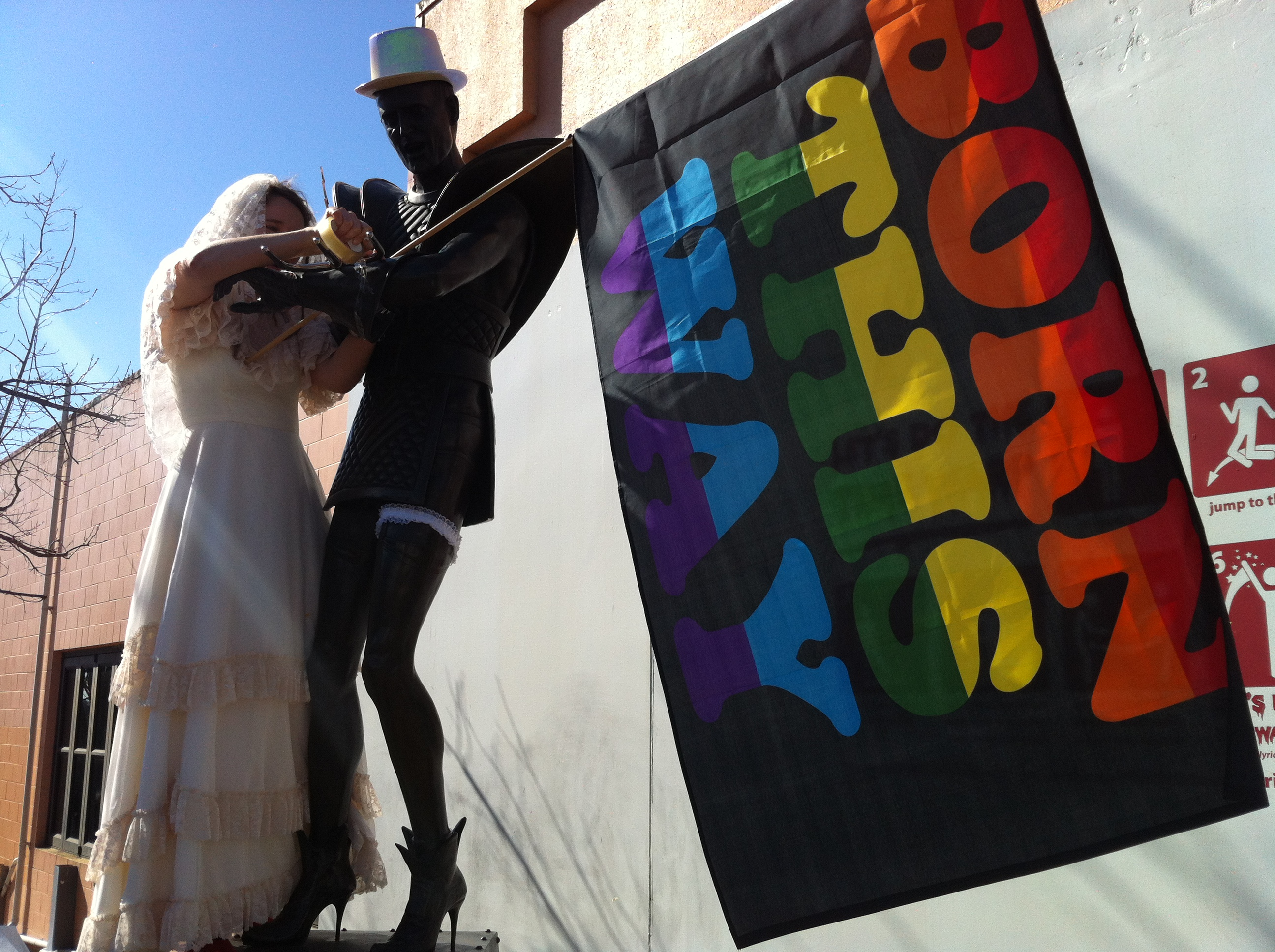
Riff Raff Statue dressed up at a same-sex marriage rally

=== Riff Raff Statue ===
The Riff Raff Statue commemorates Rocky Horror Picture Show creator Richard O'Brien, who lived in Hamilton. Weta Workshop was commissioned to create a statue of Riff Raff - one of the show's iconic characters played by O'Brien. The statue was unveiled on Victoria Street on 26 November 2004. The statue has a website and webcam at www.riffraffstatue.org.

=== Te Tiaho o Matariki ===
Located in Garden Place, Te Tiaho o Matariki was created by Neil Miller. The sculpture represents Pleiades in the form of a growing vine, with the stars of Matariki forming the fruit on the vine. It honours the city's first inhabitants (Garden Place was first used by Maori as a garden and observatory); and celebrates the horticultural heritage of the name of the city's civic plaza: Garden Place. The curving vine-like form of the sculpture also references the nearby Waikato River which snakes through the city.

=== Ripples ===
The Ripples sculpture was commissioned in 1987 for the opening of the Waikato Museum. It is a suspended sculpture, consisting of a six-metre span of carbon fibre reinforced polyester resin, which represents the ripple effects of a falling stone hitting the water. It hangs between the canopy of trees, approximately 20 metres in the air, above the Waikato Museum riverbank. It was created by Christchurch artist Neil Dawson.

=== Millennium "Koru Family" Sculpture ===
Located on the bank of the Waikato River, the Koru Family sculpture was given to Hamilton City by the Year 2000 Millennium Committee to commemorate the family in 2000. The sculpture was created by Carla Van de Veen of Te Aroha, made of Hinuera Stone.

=== Tongue of the Dog ===
A water sculpture, depicting the Māori legend of how the Waikato River came to be. Located on Victoria Street.

=== The Garden Place Sundial ===
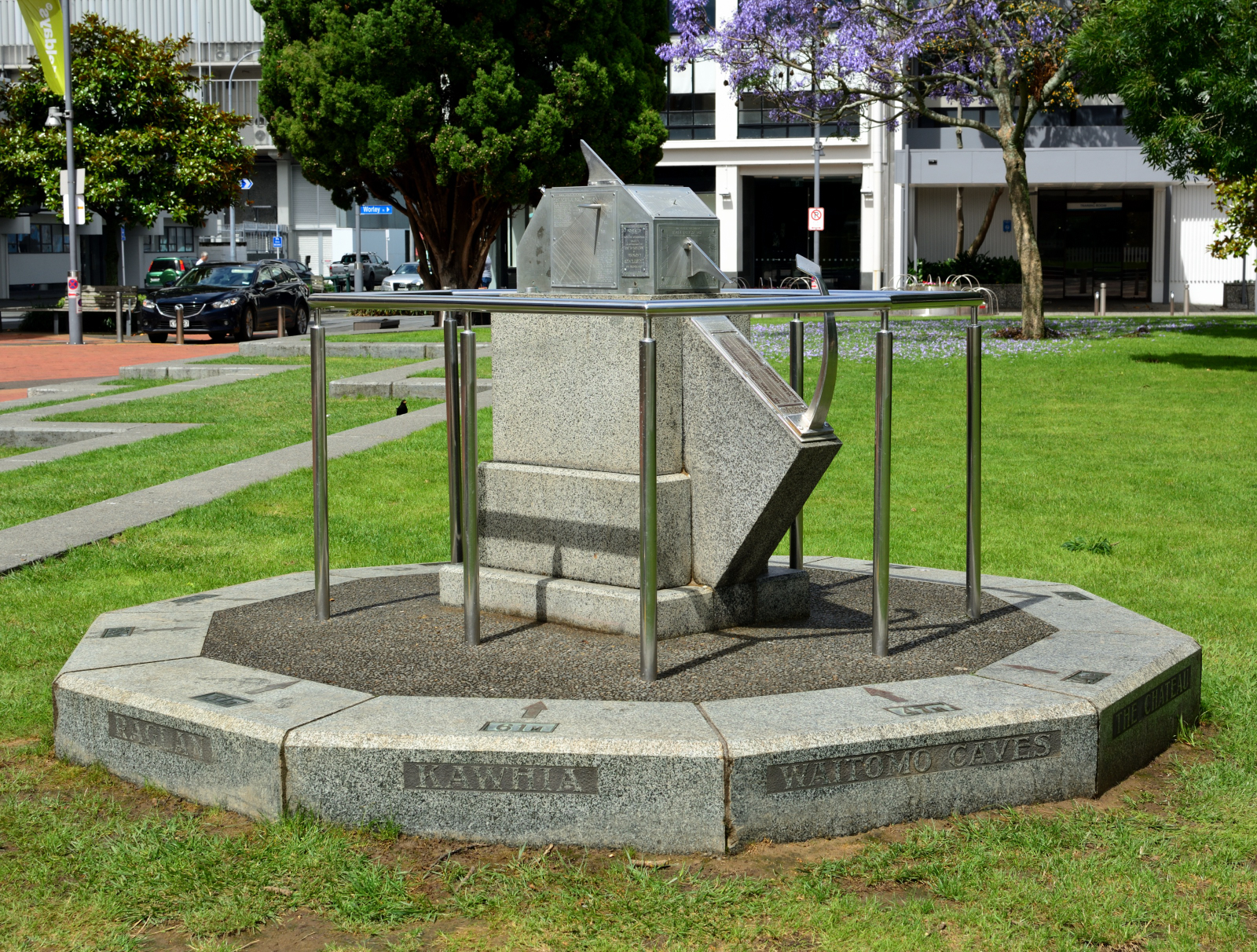
Garden Place Sundial, Hamilton, New Zealand

A Multiface Sundial with seven sundials, including an Analemma Sundial, engraved in an Art Deco style, which together show the Solar Time, Clock Time, Time of Sunrise and Sunset, the Calendar Date at Noon, solstices & equinoxes, and other astronomical phenomena. The sundial is located in front of the Central Library on the grass lawn in Garden Place, mounted on a granite pillar. The sundial was gifted to the City of Hamilton by the Hamilton Astronomical Society in 1937.

== See also ==
- List of streets in Hamilton
- Suburbs of Hamilton, New Zealand
- Claudelands Bridge
- disused underground railway station
