= Claudelands =

Suburb of Hamilton, New Zealand

- Suburb
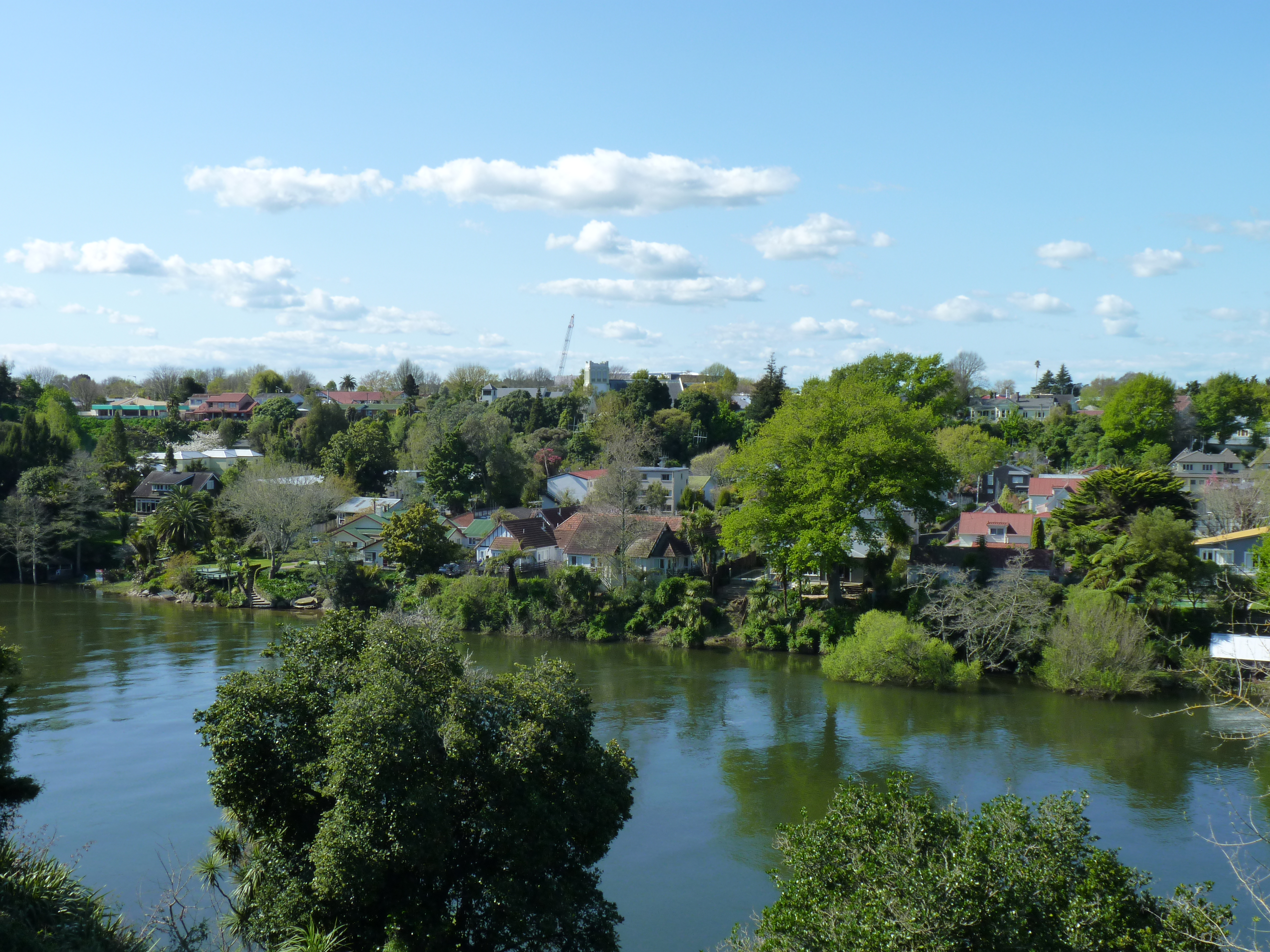
- Claudelands, from Hamilton Central
- Interactive map of Claudelands
- Coordinates: 37.77973°S 175.28189°E
- Country: New Zealand
- City: Hamilton, New Zealand
- Local authority: Hamilton City Council
- Electoral ward: East Ward
- Established: 1912

Area
  - Land: 282 ha (700 acres)

Population (June 2025)
  - Total: 7,000
  - Density: 2,500/km^{2} (6,400/sq mi)

River Road	Fairfield	Enderley
Hamilton Central	Claudelands	Hillcrest
	Hamilton East

Claudelands is a suburb directly to the east of central Hamilton, New Zealand, across the Waikato River. It is linked to the central city by the Claudelands road bridge and the East Coast Main Trunk Railway bridge.

== History ==
Miropiko Pā, at River Road, in the north-west of Claudelands, was occupied by Ngāti Wairere, Ngāti Hānui and Ngāti Koura. Following the 1864 invasion of the Waikato they moved to Gordonton and the land was confiscated and sold by the government.

Alfred William East, a captain with the 4th Waikato Regiment, was one of the original owners of Claudelands. East Street in the suburb is named for him. Francis Richard Claude was an early wealthy settler from South America who bought 400 ha (990 acres) of parcels of mainly swampy land from the original soldier-settlers who were disgruntled with their land allocation. Claude subdivided most of it in 1878. An area of kahikatea forest was then cleared to create the racecourse. It was sold to the South Auckland Racing Club and then the Waikato A&P Association, who had their first show on 27 October 1892. Racing moved to Te Rapa Racecourse in 1925.

The only piece of land in near original state is the 5 ha (12 acres) kahikatea forest, named Claudelands Bush, adjacent to Claudelands show grounds. Originally the ground in this area was swampy but artificial drainage has dried the soil. The roots of the trees are protected by an elevated walkway which is open to the public. The A&P Association gave it to the city council in 1928.

Claudelands is one of Hamilton's oldest suburbs, with a large number of bay villas and bungalows dating from the late 19th and early 20th centuries. Although later development led to the construction of a large number of two-storey blocks of flats, the unique character of the area was deemed worthy of preservation by the Hamilton City Council. To this end, strict rules governing alteration, demolition and new development were introduced.

== Features of Claudelands ==
Claudelands is home to the Claudelands Showgrounds - original site of major agricultural shows and events in Hamilton, and a trotting and dog racing track. Since passing into council ownership, a large part of it (including the race track) has been converted into a large open park. The upgraded Claudelands Arena was opened in 2011. The Claudelands Event Centre hosted a mayoral debate in 2019.

Claudelands is also home of one of Hamilton's oldest and most notable association football clubs, Claudelands Rovers.

=== Claudelands railway station ===
Claudelands had a railway station from 1884 to 1991. The station was between Brooklyn Rd and Claudelands Rd, 1.23 km (0.76 mi) east of the old Hamilton station (1879-1969) and 3.94 km (2.45 mi) west of Ruakura (1/10/1884-1/1/1967).

In 2020 double tracking, and potentially reopening the station for events, were put forward as part of a $150m scheme to relay tracks to Cambridge. The scheme was proposed as part of efforts to help the area recover from the economic impacts of the COVID-19 pandemic.

== Demographics ==
Claudelands covers 2.82 km^{2} (1.09 sq mi) and had an estimated population of 7,000 as of June 2025, with a population density of 2,482 people per km^{2}.

Historical population
Year	Pop.	±% p.a.
2006	5,994	—
2013	6,321	+0.76%
2018	6,732	+1.27%
2023	6,501	−0.70%

Claudelands had a population of 6,501 in the 2023 New Zealand census, a decrease of 231 people (−3.4%) since the 2018 census, and an increase of 180 people (2.8%) since the 2013 census. There were 3,237 males, 3,225 females and 39 people of other genders in 2,472 dwellings. 4.8% of people identified as LGBTIQ+. There were 1,134 people (17.4%) aged under 15 years, 1,557 (24.0%) aged 15 to 29, 2,802 (43.1%) aged 30 to 64, and 1,011 (15.6%) aged 65 or older.

People could identify as more than one ethnicity. The results were 59.1% European (Pākehā); 22.7% Māori; 6.4% Pasifika; 22.8% Asian; 3.2% Middle Eastern, Latin American and African New Zealanders (MELAA); and 2.2% other, which includes people giving their ethnicity as "New Zealander". English was spoken by 93.9%, Māori language by 6.5%, Samoan by 0.7%, and other languages by 20.0%. No language could be spoken by 2.3% (e.g. too young to talk). New Zealand Sign Language was known by 0.6%. The percentage of people born overseas was 31.9, compared with 28.8% nationally.

Religious affiliations were 30.9% Christian, 5.9% Hindu, 4.8% Islam, 1.4% Māori religious beliefs, 1.2% Buddhist, 0.6% New Age, and 3.4% other religions. People who answered that they had no religion were 46.6%, and 5.5% of people did not answer the census question.

Of those at least 15 years old, 1,692 (31.5%) people had a bachelor's or higher degree, 2,451 (45.7%) had a post-high school certificate or diploma, and 1,224 (22.8%) people exclusively held high school qualifications. 528 people (9.8%) earned over $100,000 compared to 12.1% nationally. The employment status of those at least 15 was that 2,751 (51.3%) people were employed full-time, 618 (11.5%) were part-time, and 216 (4.0%) were unemployed.

Individual statistical areas
Name	Area (km^{2})	Population	Density (per km^{2})	Dwellings	Median age	Median income
Claudelands	1.38	2,883	2,089	1,233	35.1 years	$44,000
Peachgrove	1.44	3,618	2,513	1,239	35.5 years	$38,000
New Zealand					38.1 years	$41,500

The Index of Socioeconomic Deprivation, ranked 1-10 from lowest to most deprived areas, lists both Claudelands and Peachgrove at 8/10 (high deprivation) in 2013.

== Education ==
Peachgrove Intermediate is a state school for years 7 and 8 with a roll of 540. The school opened in 1957.

Patricia Avenue School is a state special school with a roll of 201. It caters for students aged between 5 and 21 with intellectual disability.

Southwell School is a private Anglican preparatory school (Year 1-8). It has a roll of 647. The school was founded in 1911 and moved to its present site in 1921.

All these schools are coeducational. Rolls are as of July 2025.

== See also ==
- List of streets in Hamilton
- Suburbs of Hamilton, New Zealand
