= Claudelands railway station =

Railway station in New Zealand

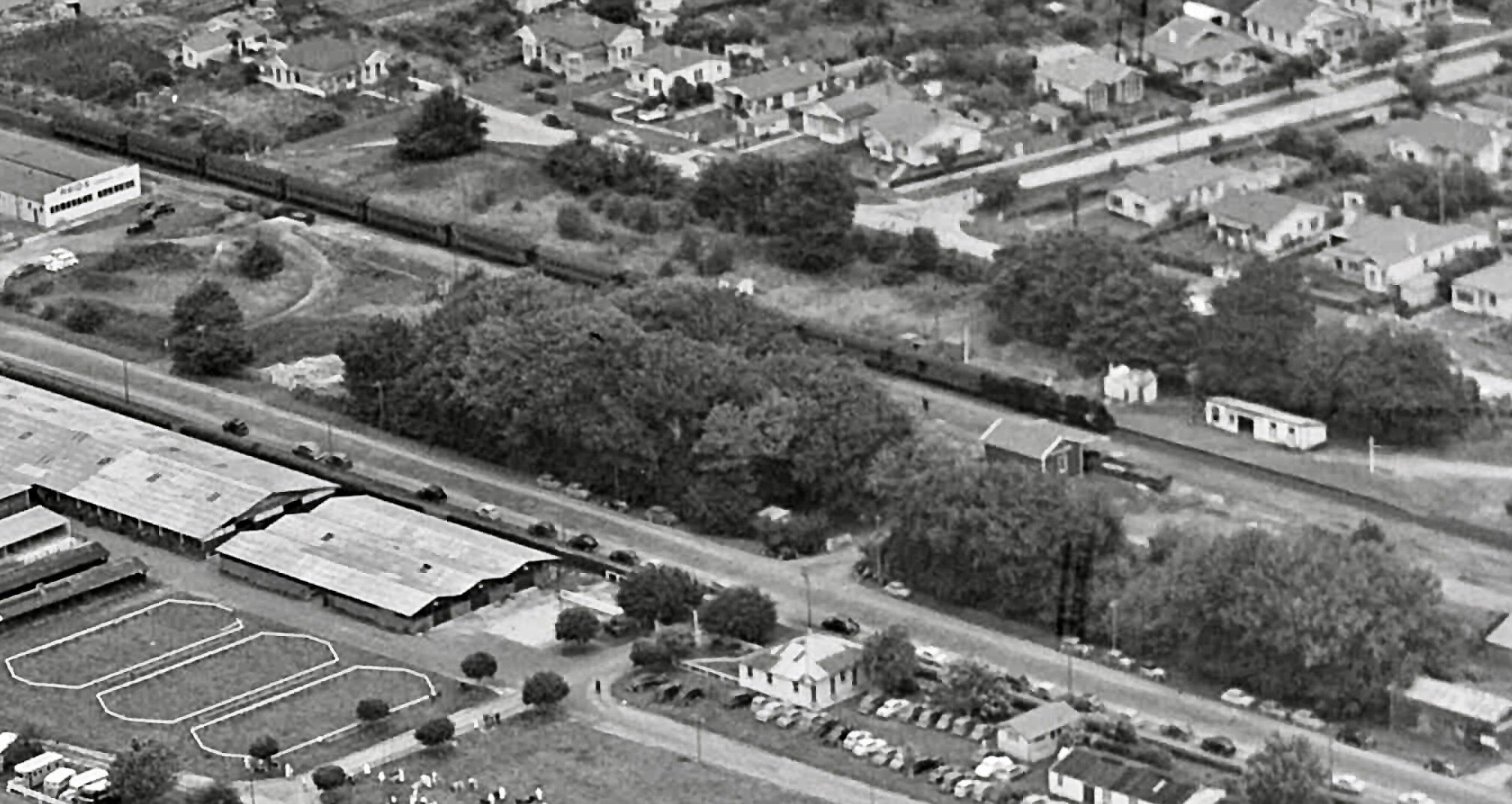
- Claudelands railway station in 1953

General information
- Location: Claudelands; New Zealand
- Coordinates: 37.7805°S 175.2904°E
- Owner: KiwiRail Network
- Line: East Coast Main Line
- Tracks: single track

History
- Opened: 1 October 1884
- Closed: 2 June 1991
- Former names: Hamilton East, Kirikiriroa

Services
Preceding station	Historical railways	Following station
Hamilton Central; Line open, station closed 1.23 km (0.76 mi)	East Coast Main Trunk; New Zealand Railways Department	Ruakura; Line open, station closed 3.94 km (2.45 mi)
Location

Claudelands railway station was a New Zealand railway station in the Hamilton suburb of Claudelands. The station was between Brooklyn Road and Claudelands Road, 1.23 km (0.76 mi) east of the old Hamilton station (1879–1969) and 3.94 km (2.45 mi) west of Ruakura (1884–1967).

== History ==
Claudelands had a railway station from 1 October 1884 to 2 June 1991, named Hamilton East until 1 March 1899, and then Kirikiriroa until 1 February 1914, when it was changed to Claudelands after a petition.

The station was between Brooklyn Road and Claudelands Road.

By 1884 the station had a goods shed and cattle pens. In 1912, the Hamilton Chamber of Commerce applied for a porter to be employed there, which was approved in 1913, when it became a tablet station and the yard was extended, after a lengthy residents' campaign. A 30 ft (9.1 m) x 20 ft (6.1 m) goods shed was built in 1925 and electric lighting added by 1927. Railway houses were built in 1920, 1954 and 1955. The station building was damaged by fire on 23 April 1949 and burnt down on 11 July 1987, though there is a photograph of the station captioned as 25 June 1988. The stockyards closed on 12 May 1969 and the station closed on 2 June 1991.

In 2020 double tracking, and potentially reopening the station for events, were put forward as part of a $150m scheme to relay tracks to Cambridge. The scheme was proposed as part of efforts to help the area recover from the economic impacts of the COVID-19 pandemic.
