= Claudelands Bridge =

New Zealand bridge

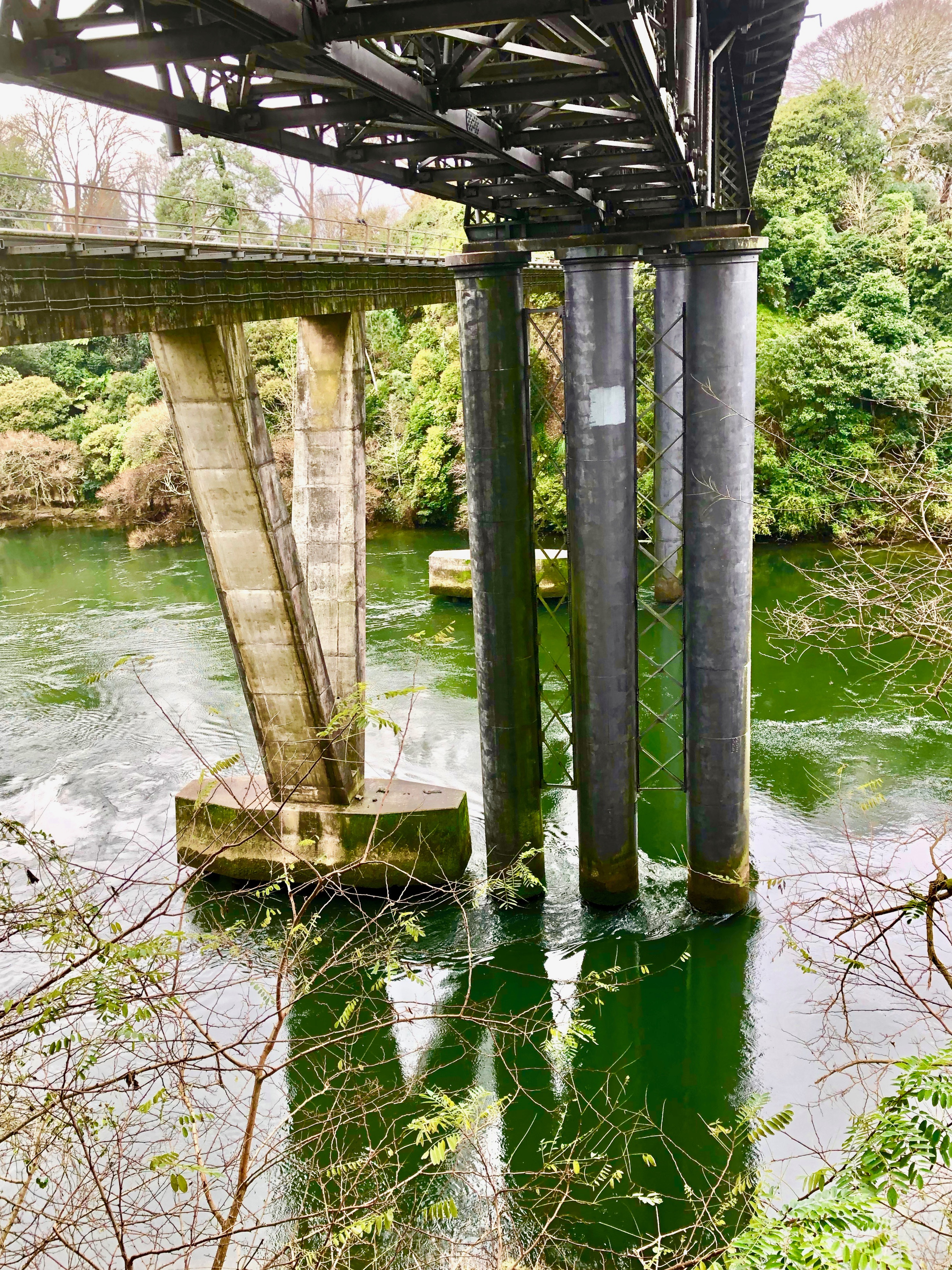
- Claudelands rail and road bridges.
- Coordinates: 37.784418°S 175.283432°E
- Carries: 2 lanes of Claudelands Rd
- Crosses: Waikato River
- Locale: Hamilton, New Zealand
- Maintained by: Hamilton City Council
- Preceded by: Victoria Bridge, Hamilton
- Followed by: Whitiora Bridge

Characteristics
- Design: Warren truss
- Material: Steel
- Total length: 436 feet (133 m)
- Height: 103 feet (31 m) river bed to road
- Longest span: 132 feet (40 m)
- No. of spans: 5
- Piers in water: 2 x 3 (until 1906 2 x 2)
- Clearance below: 82 feet (25 m)

History
- Designer: Office of John Blackett
- Construction start: 1880
- Opened: 1883 rail bridge, converted to road 1968

Statistics
- Daily traffic: 2003 13106; 2010 11900; 2015 11600; 2019 10,800; 2020 8,700; 2021 8,500; 2022 8,000

Heritage New Zealand – Category 2
- Designated: 5 September 1985
- Reference no.: 4201

Location
- Interactive map of Claudelands Bridge

Claudelands Bridge is a dual-lane truss road bridge over the Waikato River, joining Claudelands with Hamilton Central. In 1968 it was converted from the old railway bridge, which had been completed about the end of July 1883. The road bridge was given a Category 2 listing in 1985.

Vehicle use has declined in recent years, but it is the second busiest CBD route for cyclists, with 135 in peak hours in 2009 and a rising trend. To make the bridge safer for the 600 cyclists a day, sharrows were added to the lane markings in 2019. Buses to Rototuna and route 11 cross the bridge.

A new railway bridge, opened on 19 September 1964, a few metres downstream, replaced the old with a 7-span, 143 m (469 ft) pre-stressed concrete box girder bridge. The spans are supported by reinforced concrete piers, resting on in-situ cast piles. The bridge, built by Wilkinson and Davies Construction Co Ltd (involved in a 1959 contract law case and deregistered in 1967), is about 20 ft (6.1 m) lower than the road bridge, being 18 m (59 ft) above the normal river level. It was the first bridge in the country to be stressed with a 100-ton Freyssinet cable.

== Old railway bridge history ==
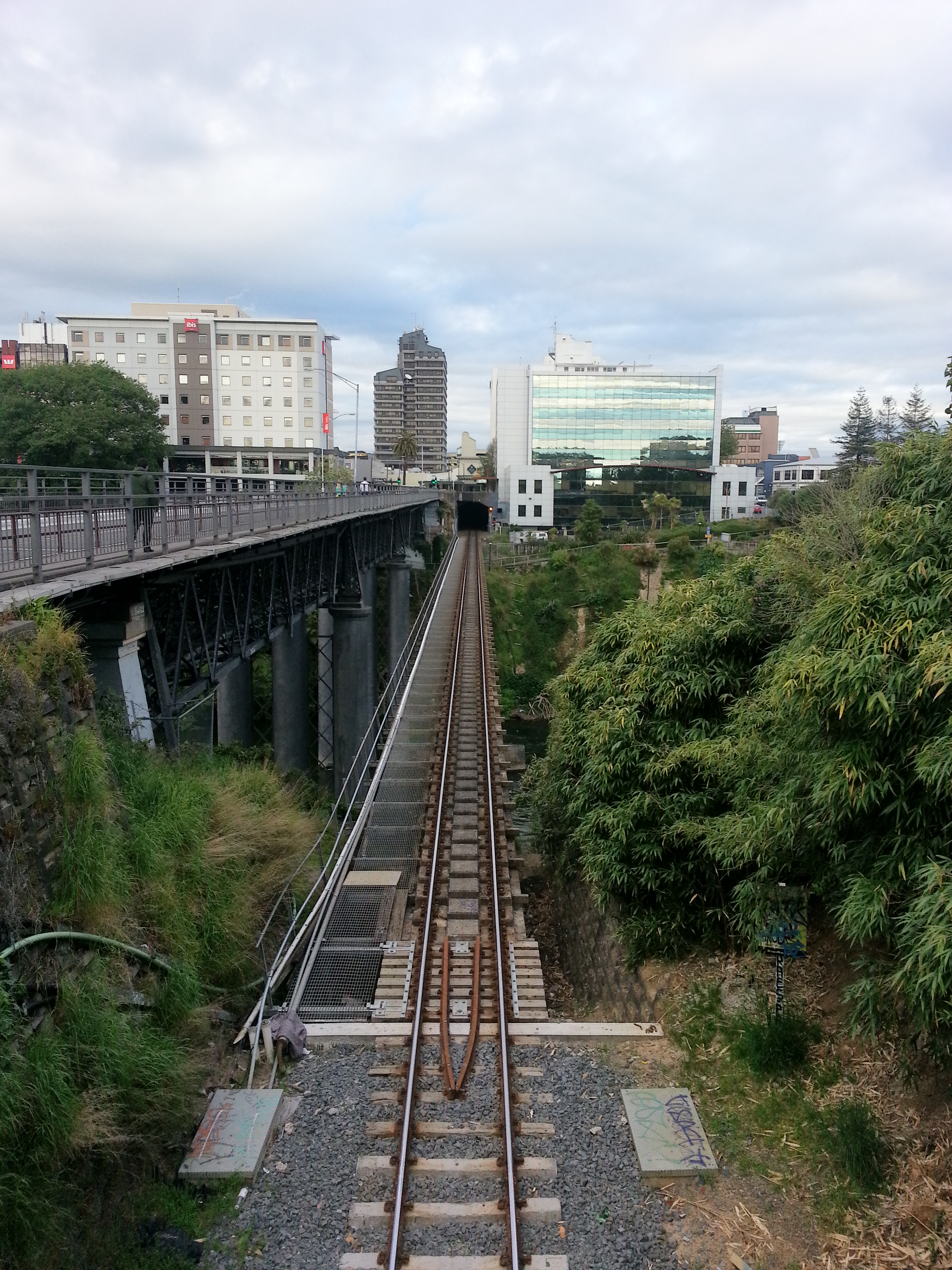
New railway bridge at a lower level

The bridge was designed in 1880 and the £5,519 contract let on 3 November 1881 to W. Sims. Although Sir George Grey turned the first sod of the railway extension at Claudelands in 1879, there seems to have been little publicity for that or the bridge, with only minimal mention in 1883. Ironwork for the bridge was reported as shipped in 1881.

Progress was very slow, criticism being made of the design after the central pier was sunk to 81 ft (25 m), without reaching rock. A month later, the contract was re-let to J. R. Stone on 18 September 1882 for £4,312 13s 6d, plus the £1,376 cost (the £5,688 total would now be equivalent to just under $1m) of the four cast cylinders from A&G Price. However, work stopped in November 1882, when it was realised the foundations were inadequate, requiring bracing of the cylinders and deepening of the foundations from 3 to 24 ft (7.3 m). The bridge was completed on 21 September 1883 and used for construction trains, until the Hamilton-Morrinsville railway opened on 1 October 1884.

=== Strengthening ===
It was originally tested with a 117-ton load. To cope with greater loads, an extra cylinder was added to the original two on each side of the main channel, the 2 new cylinders being ordered from S Luke & Co for £2,354 in 1906, and the new deck from A & T Burt Ltd for £5,872 in 1907. Further strengthening was designed in 1934 to cope with the 135-ton K-Class locomotives.

=== Footbridge ===
There was pressure for a footbridge from before the railway was opened, See also a newspaper report from 1893. A commission was appointed to investigate in 1906. With the widening and strengthening of the bridge, it was possible to build a footbridge in 1908, though there were complaints about the lack of lighting and cycling was banned. The footbridge was renewed in 1936.

=== Replacement ===
There was soon also pressure to remove the railway from the centre of the CBD. In 1912 the Borough Council suggested the line could be lowered. A 1938 plan was stopped by war in 1939. The National Roads Board then promoted it and, in September 1959, the Ministry of Works started the scheme to put the railway in a tunnel and replace the old bridge with one at the tunnel level.

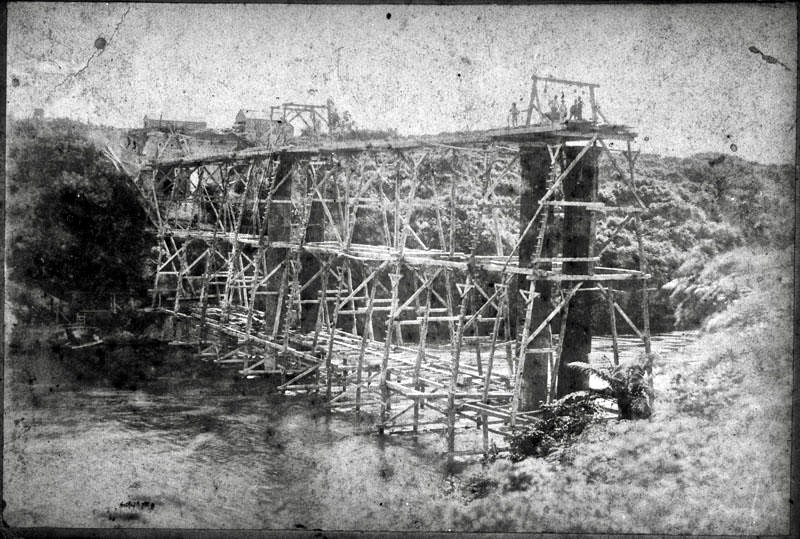
Claudelands Bridge construction about 1882

== Utilities ==
From 1970 to 1974 33kV cables were laid across the bridge. Further wiring was done in 1988.
