= Wintec =

Australian saddle manufacturer

Wintec Saddles was launched in 1916 and is a saddle brand known for the first nonsynthetic saddles.

== History ==
The company is a subsidiary of Saddlery Brands International. (formerly Bates Australia), originally established in 1934,

== Saddles ==
The Easy Change Gullet System was designed in 1998 to help custom fit a saddle to a horse’s withers, maintaining clearance of the wither as the horse’s shape changes. and help maintain a good saddle fit

The CAIR Panel System, an air filled panel, was developed in 2000 as an alternative to the traditional flocking in saddles, and helps to evenly distribute the rider’s weight.

== Major Affiliations ==
Wintec Saddles is the Official Saddle of the American Riding Instructors Association and the US Pony Clubs
