= Hamilton Central railway station, New Zealand =

Defunct railway station in New Zealand

Hamilton Central
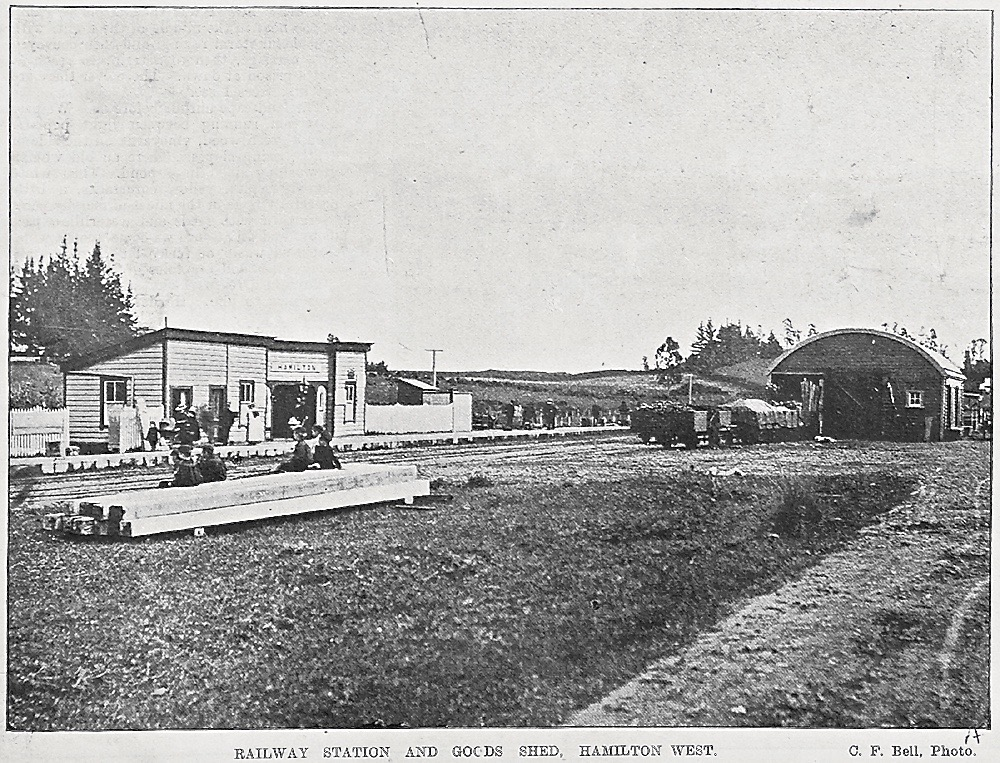
- 1899 station and goods shed

General information
- Location: New Zealand
- Coordinates: 37°47′13″S 175°16′43″E
- Owner: KiwiRail
- Line: East Coast Main Trunk (goods only)
- Platforms: 1
- Connections: North Island Main Trunk

History
- Opened: 1 October 1884
- Closed: 1 November 1969
- Rebuilt: 1964
- Former names: Hamilton West until 1 March 1899

Services
Preceding station	Historical railways	Following station
Hamilton; Line open, station open 1.7 km (1.1 mi)	East Coast Main Trunk; KiwiRail	Claudelands; Line open, station closed 1.23 km (0.76 mi)
Location

Hamilton Central was the name of a now-defunct railway station on the East Coast Main Trunk line which runs through the city of Hamilton in the Waikato region of New Zealand. The station was located in Hamilton's CBD and was made an underground station for the latter years of its existence before being closed. The underground platform still exists.

For most of the time since 1879, when the station opened on the site, it was named Hamilton. It closed to regular passenger services when the present Hamilton station opened on 6 August 1975, so there was little need for formal renaming. There have been several proposals to reopen the station, often using the name 'Hamilton Central'.

The East Coast Main Trunk line is still well used by freight trains. In 2018, 163 trains a week passed through, 36 between 8am and 5pm on weekdays, 90 of them outside those hours, and 37 on weekends.

== History ==
The station likely opened as Hamilton on 22 March 1879, with a lean-to station building. In July 1879, it was said that it should take about a month to complete the extension. It only had 282 passengers in the year 1880/81 and closed on 19 February 1881. It was likely affected by delays in opening Claudelands bridge; the 16 mi 73 ch (27.2 km) Eureka contract to Morrinsville was signed on 5 December 1883, though tenders had been invited over two years earlier.

On 1 October 1884 when the Morrinsville line opened, the station reopened as Hamilton West. By 1884, it had a 4th class station building, platform, cart approach, 60 ft (18 m) by 30 ft (9.1 m) goods shed and loading bank. In 1896 there was also a stationmaster's house, urinals and a passing loop for 38 wagons. In 1892 the station was improved and increased accommodation, with further improvements in 1897, 1899 and 1900, when a verandah was added.

The station was renamed to Hamilton on 1 March 1899. In 1902 it was described as being, "of wood and iron, and has a ladies' waiting room, a public lobby, stationmaster's room, a long passenger platform, and a large goods shed. Four trains pass the station daily, each way." In 1905, the stationmaster's house was shifted and a porters room, parcels office and store were added. The luggage room and verandah were extended in 1909. A crossing keeper controlled the Victoria Street crossing from 1912, when the platform was extended 200 ft (61 m) west and asphalted. In 1924 a new, larger storeroom at the Frankton end replaced one at the other end.

Work to underground the station began in 1961, with removal of sidings, a loading shelter and the goods shed. The line was lowered in 1964. Its platform was moved to a cutting from 1 September 1964. It lost its railcar service to Te Puke on 11 September 1967 and to Rotorua on 11 November 1968. It then lost its station building, which is now a café at Waikato University. In 1969 a new 3-storey, 23,700 ft^{2} (2,200 m^{2}) Administration Building opened, built by Holm Construction Ltd. for the Ministry of Works and linked by a covered walkway to the Road Services terminal in Ward Street and the underground rail platform. By the mid-1970s most of the station had been covered by carparks, which were later covered by the Centre Place shopping centre. When the current Hamilton station opened on 6 August 1975, the rarely used platform was renamed Hamilton Travel Centre.

The station was once served by several named trains, including the Rotorua, Geyserland, Thames and Taneatua Expresses.

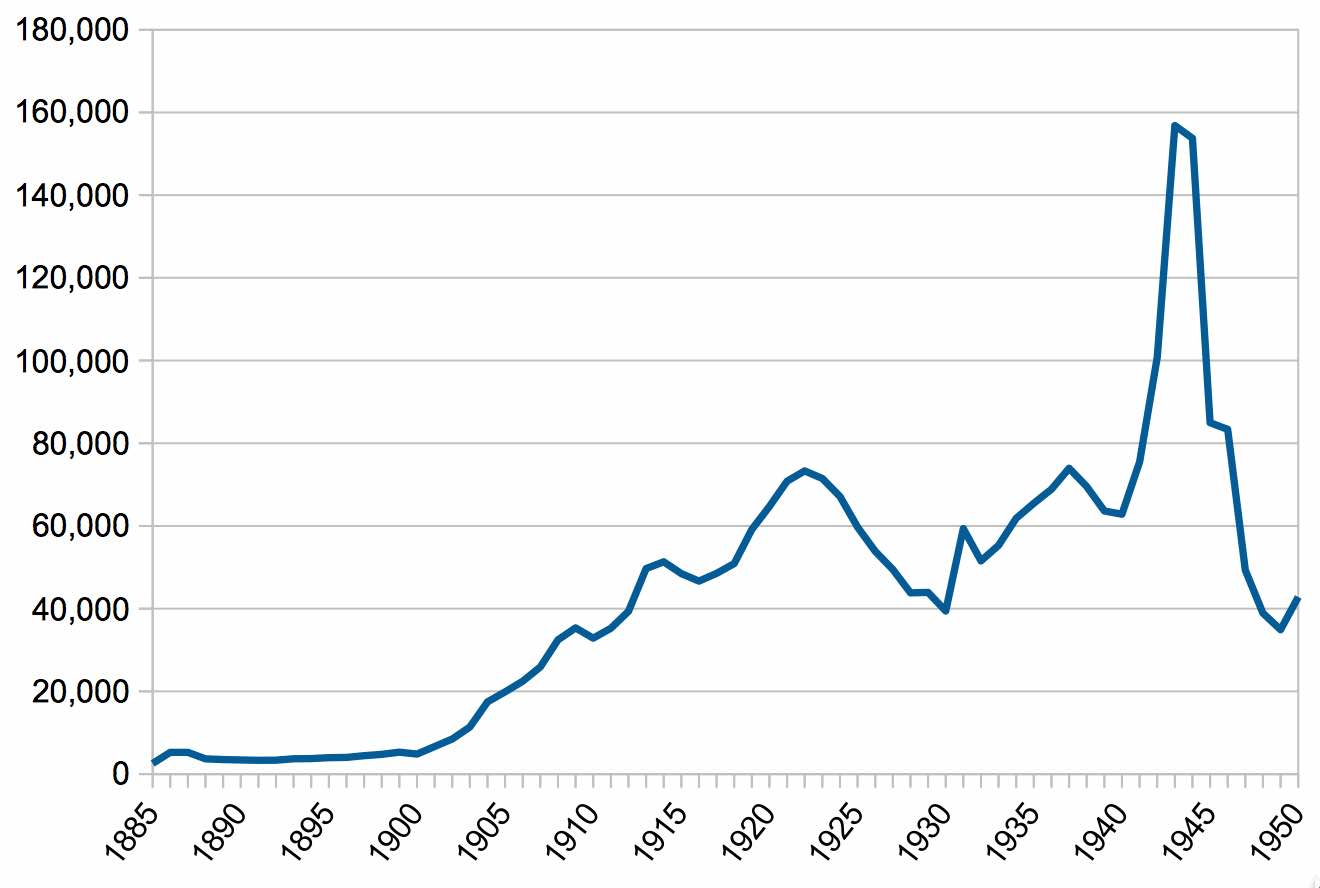
Tickets and season tickets sold at Hamilton 1885–1950 (derived from figures in table).

Traffic grew to a peak in World War II, as shown in the graph and table below.

year	tickets	season tickets	staff	ref.
1885	2,554	1	2	
1886	5,253		2	
1887	5,246		1	
1888	3,687	16	2	
1889	3,504	29	2	
1890				
1891	3,328	31	2	
1892	3,348	26	2	
1893	3,702	38	2	
1894	3,748	25	2	
1895	3,958		2	
1896	4,034	9	2	
1897	4,447	7	2	
1898	4,766	3	2	
1899	5,303	2	2	
1900	4,838	1	3	
1901				
1902	8,486	1	3	
1903	11,358	4	4	
1904	17,454	4	5	
1905	19,885	126	6	
1906	22,461	140	6	
1907	25,893	212	7	
1908	32,446	207	8	
1909	35,357	202	8	
1910	32,874	208	9	
1911	35,269	150	9	
1912	39,339	228	11	
1913	49,704	275	16	
1914	51,322	338		
1915	48,465	387		
1916	46,658	424		
1917	48,529	466		
1918	50,899	416		
1919	59,170	339		
1920	64,708	343		
1921	70,815	449		
1922	73,303	567		
1923	71,486	589		
1924	67,103	559		
1925	59,705	435		
1926	53,862	601		
1927	49,481	618		
1928	43,819	514		
1929	43,922	606		
1930	39,431	661		
1931	59,360	567		
1932	51,558	500		
1933	55,308	503		
1934	61,842	518		
1935	65,478	547		
1936	68,877	638		
1937	73,951	578		
1938	69,537	568		
1939	63,611	527		
1940	62,829	873		
1941	75,496	481		
1942	100,724	385		
1943	156,825	387		
1944	153,740	418		
1945	84,973	269		
1946	83,363	252		
1947	49,293	144		
1948	38,902	56		
1949	34,925	64		
1950	42,813	49		

=== New Zealand's first underground station ===
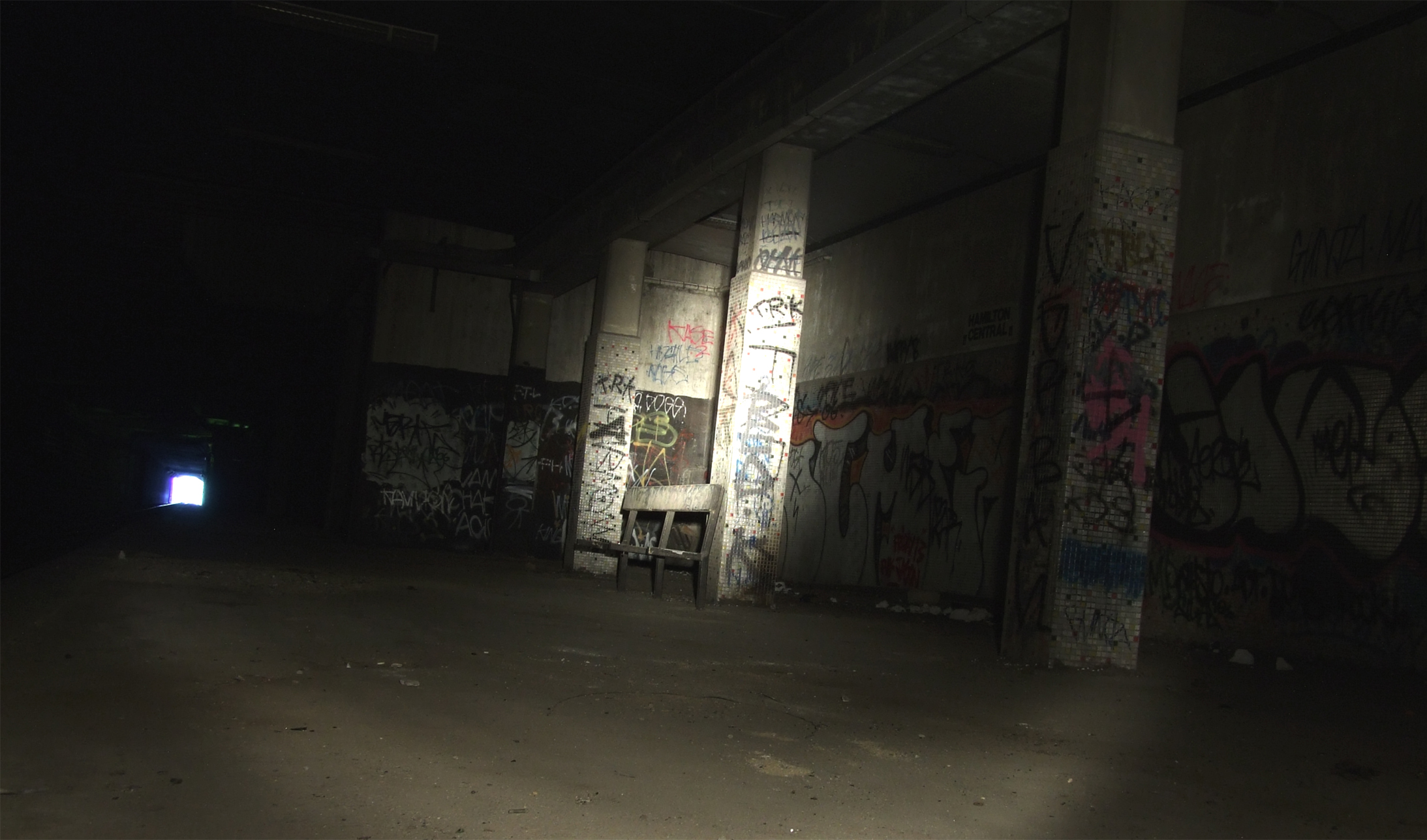
Hamilton Central Railway Station

Level crossings at Lake Rd, Seddon St and Victoria St, and rising population and levels of rail and road traffic, resulted in re-routing proposals from 1912, when council suggested the line could be lowered. It was turned down again in 1919, proposed as a diversion south of Frankton in 1929 and costed at £529,000 in 1938.

The National Roads Board then opted for it and, in September 1959, the Ministry of Works started the project. The platform was lowered about 20 ft (6.1 m) into a cut & cover tunnel approached on 1 in 80 gradients, with road over-bridges at River Rd, Tristram/Hinemoa, Seddon Streets and Lake Rd. The new route and platform opened on 19 September 1964, after which Anglesea St was extended north of Ward St.

An NZR bus station (replaced by the Transport Centre in 2001) was built on top of the station, with a ramp link to it. The underground station was used by the Kaimai Express and Geyserland Express from when they started running on 9 December 1991 until 1 July 1994 when the station was closed due to vandalism and concerns about passenger safety. The ramp was closed when the Warehouse was built in 2004, though a plan had been prepared to maintain access.

A scheme to reopen the station, possibly with 3 tracks and possibly just to the west in Seddon Park, was put forward in 2020 as part of an effort to help the area recover from the economic impacts of the COVID-19 pandemic. The scheme was part of a wider initiative to upgrade services to Auckland and relay tracks to Cambridge.
