= Centre Place =

- Location: Hamilton, New Zealand
- Coordinates: 37°47′9.91″S 175°16′48.78″E
- Address: Hamilton Central
- Opened: 21 October 1985
- Owner: Kiwi Property
- Num. of stores: 100
- Floor area: 26,000 square metres (280,000 sq ft)
- Floors: 2
- Website: centreplace.co.nz

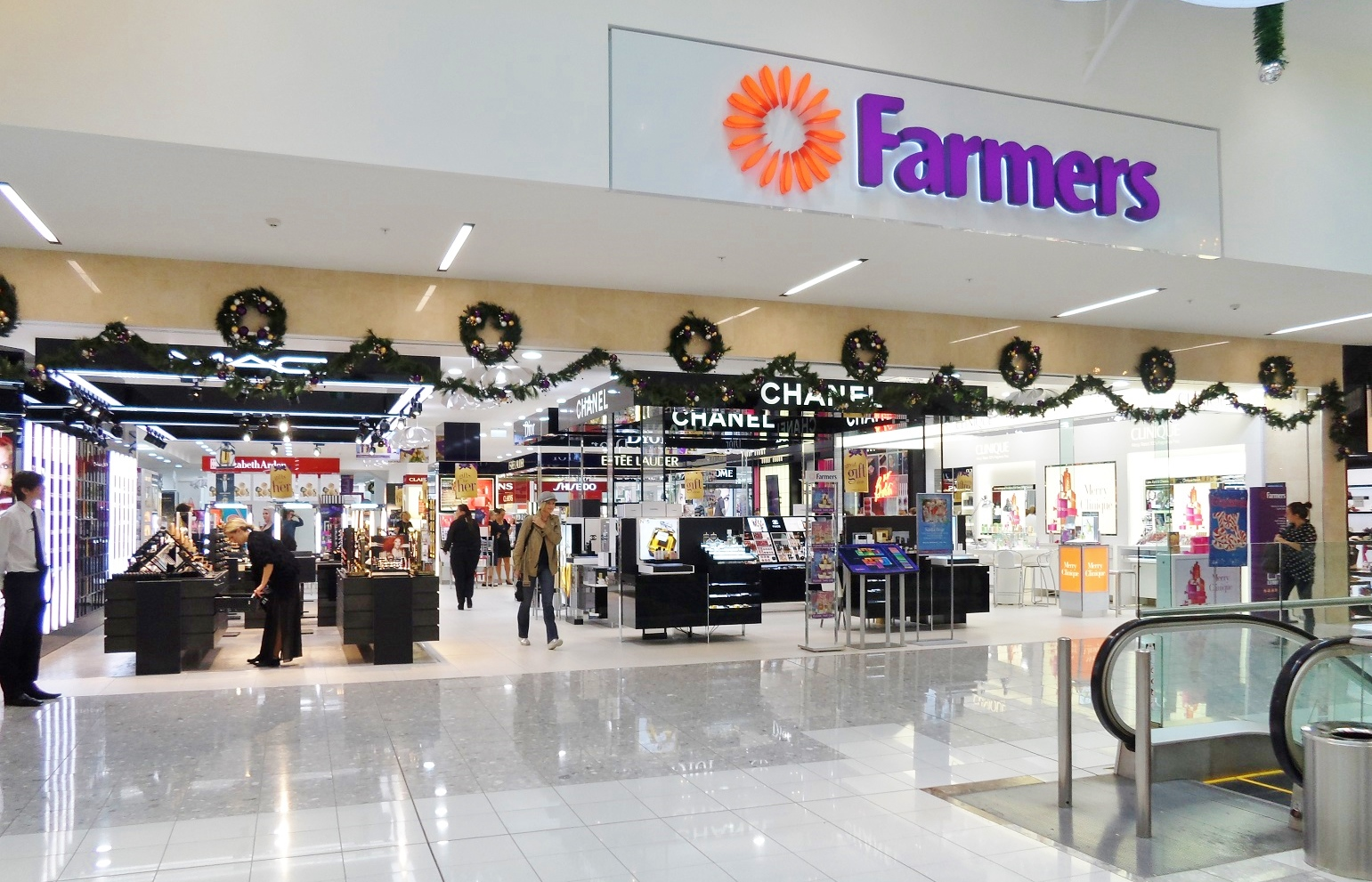
Anchor tenant Farmers

Centre Place Shopping Centre is a shopping mall in Hamilton, New Zealand. It is located in the suburb of Hamilton Central. Centre Place is one of the city's three major malls along with Te Awa at The Base and Chartwell Shopping Centre.

A scheme for the former Hamilton Central station site was promoted in 1969, though the site was still an undeveloped car park in 1981. Development started in 1984 and Centreplace opened on 21 October 1985. In October 2013, an extension of Centre Place replaced the former Downtown Plaza. With the expansion, the centre has a total retail floor space of approximately 26,000 m^{2} (280,000 sq ft), with an anchor tenant of Farmers (7,000 m^{2} (75,000 sq ft)).
