= Whitiora Bridge =

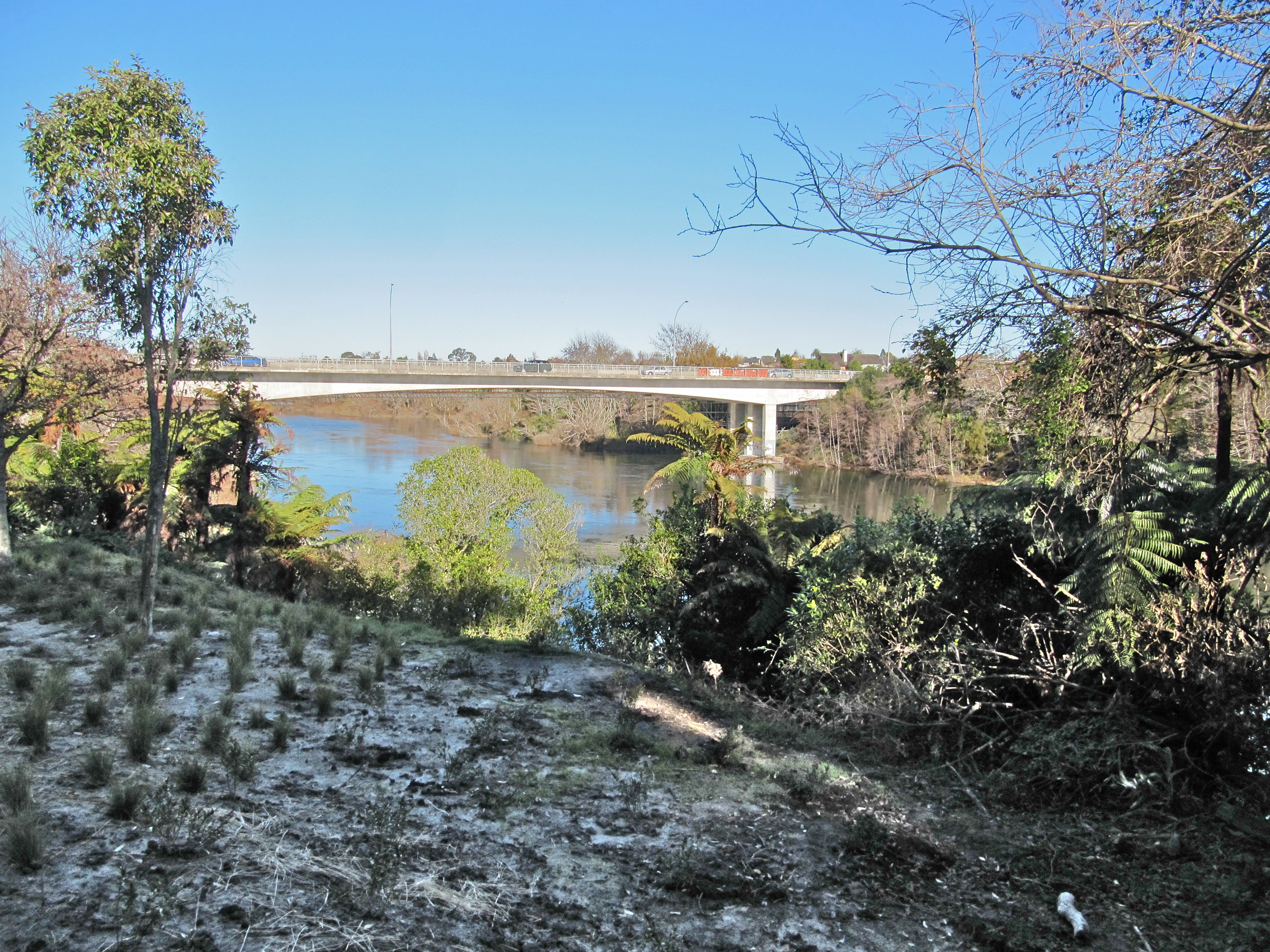
- 2012 view from riverside walkway
- Coordinates: 37°46′35.6″S 175°16′37.9″E
- Carries: Motor vehicles
- Crosses: Waikato River
- Owner: Hamilton City Council
- Preceded by: Claudelands Bridge
- Followed by: Fairfield Bridge

Characteristics
- Total length: 260 metres (850 ft)
- Height: 28 metres (92 ft)
- No. of spans: 45, 53, 64, 53, 45 m

History
- Constructed by: Rope Construction Ltd
- Construction start: 1975
- Construction end: 1978

Statistics
- Daily traffic: 2000 19,090; 2005 21,750; 2010 22,500; 2015 25,200; 2020 24,000; 2021 25,200; 2022 23,100

Whitiora Bridge is a prestressed concrete box girder bridge in Hamilton, New Zealand, spanning the Waikato River. It cost $2.35m, or $3.4m including the approach roads, and was opened at the start of a weekend of Centennial celebrations, on 11 February 1978, by representatives of Māori, Government and City, Dame Te Atairangikaahu, Venn Young and Ross Jansen.

Whitiora Bridge was also a name once used for the Victoria St bridge over the Waitawhiriwhiri Stream, just to the north in Whitiora.

A 1931 study looked at four possible bridges between the current Whitiora and Claudelands bridges, ranging in length from 430 ft (130 m) to 540 ft (160 m). The plans were shelved in 1933 when it was agreed to contribute 25% of the Fairfield Bridge cost.

The 1969 Hamilton Transportation Study proposed the bridge, which was designed by Murray North Partners (who also designed Pukete sewer bridge and Rangiriri bridge) and built by Rope Construction Ltd (who also built Rakaia Bridge). It is on Taupō pumice alluvium and carries Boundary Rd at a 25 degree skew over the river and River Rd. At 260 m (850 ft), that makes it significantly longer than 133 m (436 ft) Claudelands, or 139 m (456 ft) Fairfield, but the alignment minimised tree damage and lined up with a new extension of Boundary Rd from Mill St/Ulster St. The east end of Boundary Rd was shown on the 1879 map of Claudelands, In 1915 there was a complaint about its lack of drainage and, in 1933, Jesmond Park was laid out at its river end, later crossed by the bridge.

The bridge rests on four 1.8 m (5 ft 11 in) diameter octagonal piers, sunk 30 metres (98 ft) below the river, which are slightly narrower than the 5 spans of box girders. Sliding hinge joints in the landward spans give earthquake protection. Hydraulic shock transmission at the expansion joints will keep the sections of the bridge together in an earthquake.

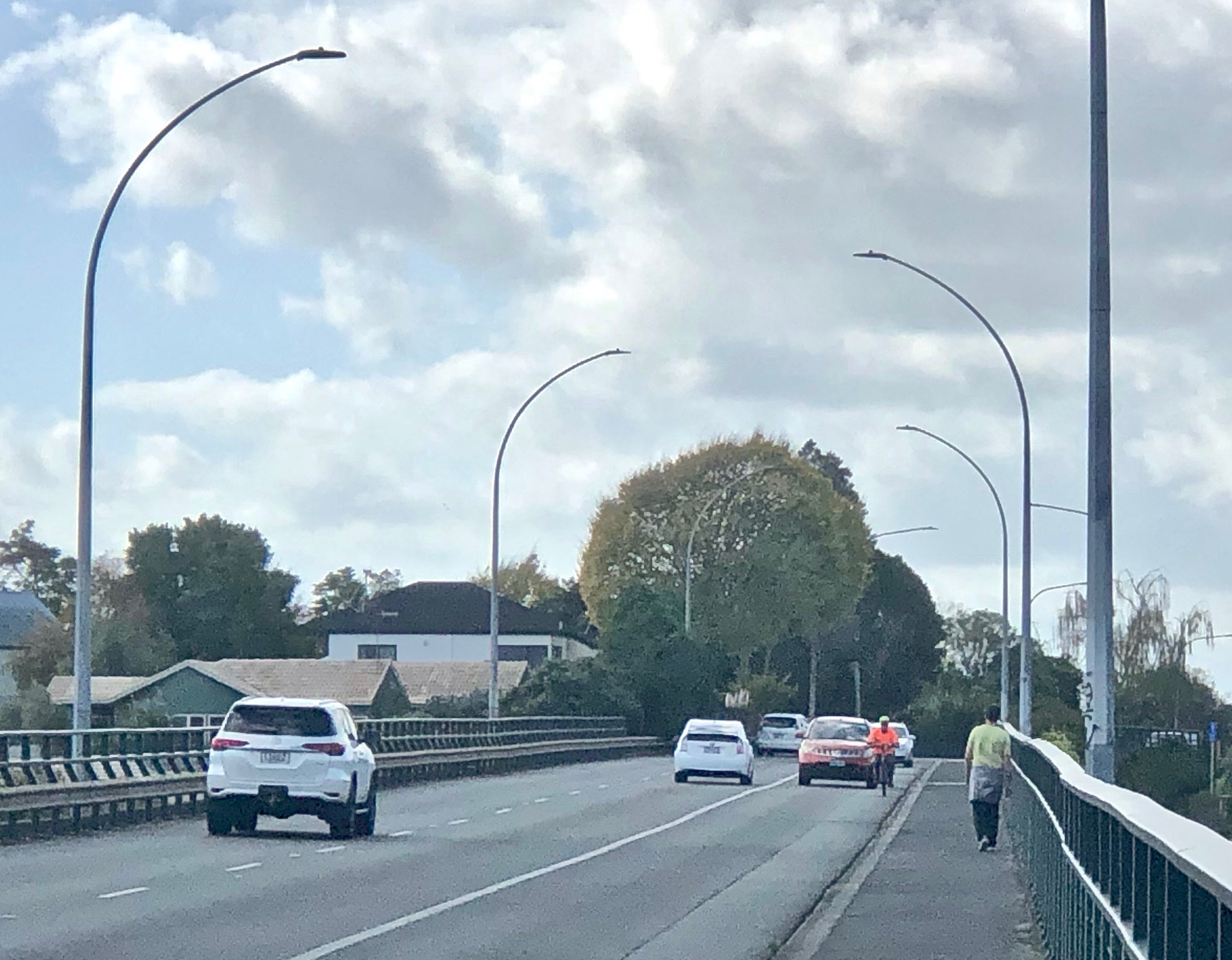
Whitiora Bridge - 2 traffic lanes, cycle tracks and a footpath were converted to 3 traffic lanes and a footpath in 2006

Cycle Action Waikato complained in 2014, after the 2 traffic lanes, cycle tracks and footpath were converted to 3 traffic lanes and a footpath in 2006. The City's 1972 design brief, required up to 4 traffic lanes. The bridge carries about 200 cyclists a day and a clip-on cycle lane has been considered, with $1m budgeted for 2028.

During its design and construction the bridge was known as the Boundary Road Bridge and is still often referred to as such. 'Whitiora' was selected from a public suggestion, derived from 'Whiti', the call of the pipiwharauroa, and 'ora', meaning life, or health.

Miropiko pā, beside River Rd, just south of the bridge, is the best preserved of a number of Hamilton pā sites.
