= Bates Australia =

Australian saddle manufacturer

Saddlery Brands International
- Industry: Manufacturing

Bates Australia, now Saddlery Brands International is a leading saddle manufacturer originally established in 1934. Bates Saddlery was formed when Mr. George Bates borrowed $100 from his sister, bought a sewing machine and began to make saddles on the veranda of his home in Perth, Western Australia. Saddlery Brands International (directly owned by the parent company Hammersmith Nominees) is the parent company to Arena Saddles, Bates Saddles and Wintec Saddles.

The family-owned business, located in Perth, Western Australia, has expanded into many international markets and can now be found in 36 countries around the world.
