= Wilkinson and Davies Construction Co Ltd v Geraldine Borough =

Cited case in New Zealand

Wilkins and Davies Construction Co Ltd v Geraldine Borough
- Court: High Court of New Zealand
- Full case name: Wilkins and Davies Construction Co Ltd v Geraldine Borough
- Decided: 16 July 1958
- Citation: [1958] NZLR 985

Court membership
- Judge sitting: Henry J

Wilkins and Davies Construction Co Ltd v Geraldine Borough [1958] NZLR 985 is a cited case in New Zealand regarding frustration of contract.
