= Economic impact of the COVID-19 pandemic in New Zealand =

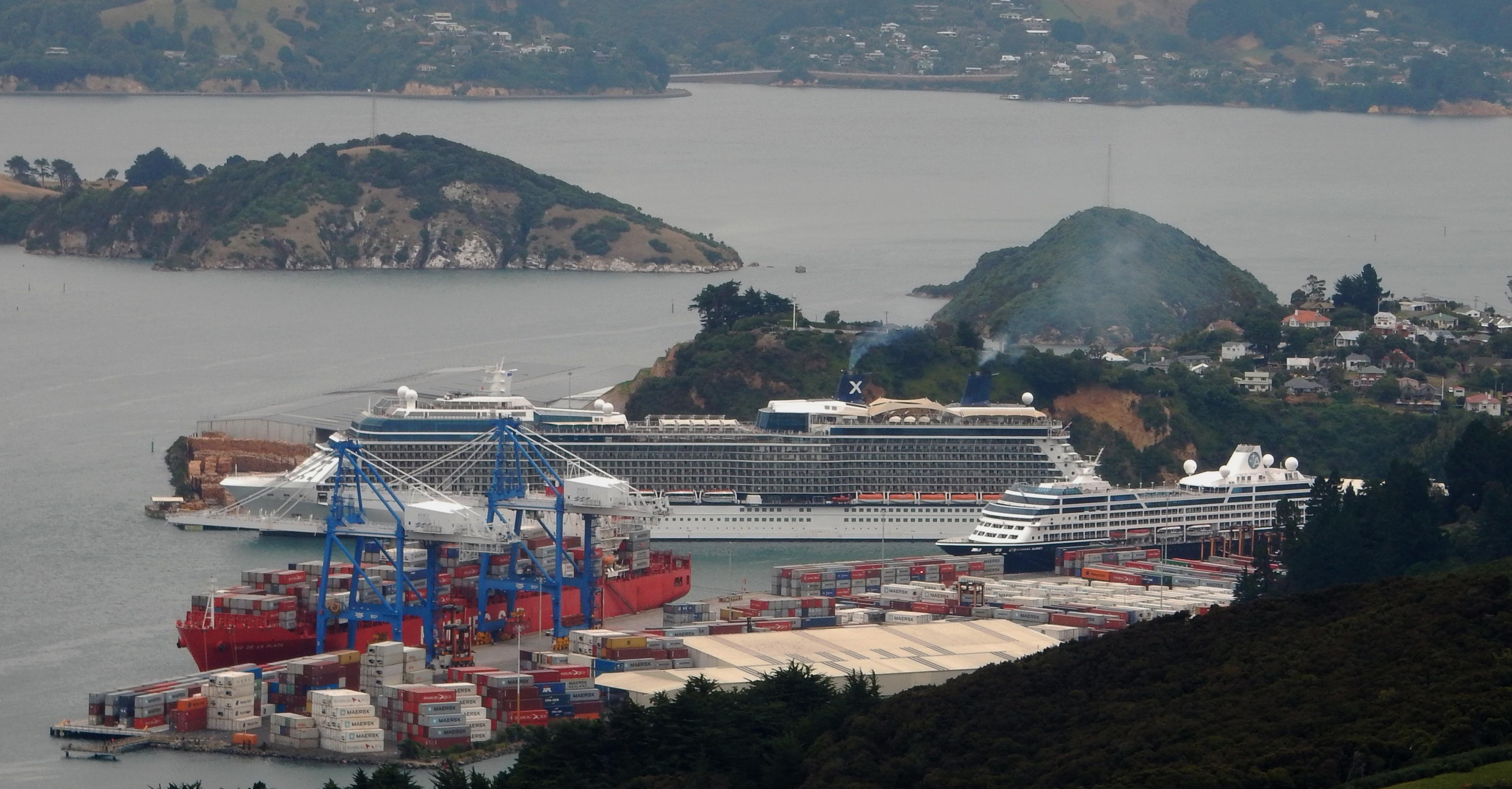
Two cruise ships—Celebrity Solstice and Azamara Journey—in Port Chalmers on 15 March

The global COVID-19 pandemic had a significant impact on the New Zealand economy. New Zealand has a mixed economy – a free market with some state ownership and control. In mid-March 2020, the New Zealand Government imposed a four-tier alert level system, which placed much of the country's economy into lockdown with the exception of "essential services" such as supermarkets. Due to the success of the Government's elimination strategy, lockdown restrictions on various economic activities were progressively lifted between April and June 2020.

Although somewhat abruptly sidelined from their normal influence within the New Zealand economy, representatives of the business sector continued to feature in media reporting: lobbying against perceived discrepancies in various industries, publicising habitual evaluations such as business-confidence indicators and economic outlooks, and itching for an early return to "business as usual".

On 17 September 2020, New Zealand economy officially entered into a recession, with the country's gross domestic product contracting by 12.2% in the June quarter due to the COVID-19 pandemic. The retail, accommodation, hospitality, and transportation sectors were adversely affected by the international travel ban and a strict nationwide lockdown.

After successfully containing the virus, the New Zealand economy had sharp growth in what is known as a V-shaped recovery and ended the year with an overall economic expansion of 0.4%, better than the predicted 1.7% contraction. Unemployment also dropped to 4.9% in December 2020, down from a peak Covid effected rate of 5.3% in September.

By mid–September 2021, the Restaurant Association's Chief executive Marisa Bidois estimated that about 1,000 hospitality businesses nationwide had been forced to close as a result of the COVID-19 pandemic, leading to the loss of 13,000 jobs. This has led the Association to lobby the Government for continued wage subsidies and incentives to boost customer rates. By mid–November 2021, the Bay of Plenty Times reported that 26,774 companies had been liquidated by August 2021.

In early February 2022, the Organisation of Economic Cooperation and Development (OECD) identified the country's border restrictions and declining house prices as the major risks to the New Zealand economy that year. While the OECD report credited New Zealand's elimination strategy, wage and socio-economic subsidies with helping the economy to bounce back to pre-pandemic levels, it also warned that excessive Government spending was causing the economy to overheat and raising debt levels. The OECD welcomed the Reserve Bank of New Zealand's decision to raise interest rates but also urged the Government to raise the superannuation age, ease building restrictions, and reduce government spending.

In late October 2022, the New Zealand Government ended its COVID-19 "handouts" programme for businesses. Stuff reported a 48% increase in formal insolvency proceedings in the third quarter of 2022, taking the total of business insolvencies that year to 384. In addition, receivership rates increased by 243% to 24 while voluntary administrations rose by 60% to eight. The transport and delivery sectors reported a 229% increase insolvency proceedings due to a shortage of drivers. The building services and construction sectors reported 50 and 107 insolvencies respectively, citing the economic and labour challenges caused by the COVID-19 pandemic.

== Sectors ==
=== Accommodation ===
On 24 March 2020, two local authorities and the New Zealand Motor Caravan Association announced they were closing their camping grounds.

On 12 August 2020, Aged Care Association chief executive Simon Wallace announced that all rest homes in New Zealand would go into full lockdown immediately until midnight Friday (14 August) in response to a recent wave of community transmissions.

=== Agriculture ===
On 31 March 2020, NZ Pork CEO David Baines warned that the Government's decision to classify butcheries as non-essential services would have serious implications for the welfare of pigs on New Zealand farms. Due to a surplus in pigs, many farms lacked sufficient space to store pigs.

On 22 August, it was reported that about 2.5 million bees had starved to death after workers from Waikato were unable to travel to Auckland to access beehives due to checkpoints imposed following a surge in community transmissions in Auckland. Businesses affected include Waitakaruru Honey Limited. Apiculture New Zealand had applied to the Ministry of Health for an exemption on behalf of commercial bee keepers.

In October and November 2020, the horticultural and viticultural industries reported a shortage of workers since the Government's border restrictions and managed isolation requirements prevented tourists and seasonal workers from entering the country. Under the Recognised Seasonal Employer scheme, horticultural and viticultural producers are normally allowed to recruit seasonal workers from the Pacific Islands and selected Asian countries. In addition, tourists from certain countries are allowed to work on a visitor visa. This labour shortage has caused fruits and crops to rot. Local growers have reported difficulty in recruiting locals due to the long hours, hard, outdoor work, lower wages, and them lacking the specialised picking and plant-care skills that foreign workers.

In mid–October 2020 Richard Palmer, the CEO of the producer representative body Summerfruit New Zealand, warned that the horticulture might not be able to pick up 30% of its harvest that year, a shortfall that could cost NZ$1.25 billion in export earnings. In late October 2020, Horticulture NZ and the New Zealand Apples and Pears Inc launched a jobs service called Pick Tiki to recruit urban young people into fruit-picking jobs in Hawke's Bay, Nelson, and Central Otago.

On 11 February 2021, Stuff reported that the Government's New Zealand Work Scheme to address the labour shortage in the fruit-picking sector caused by COVID-19 had only attracted 54 people since its launch in late November 2020. The scheme had offered up to NZ$200 to cover accommodation costs and a NZ$1,000 incentive payment to workers who had completed jobs that lasted for six weeks or longer.

On 2 August 2021, Prime Minister Jacinda Ardern announced that seasonal workers from Tonga, Samoa and Vanuatu will be allowed to enter the country without having to go into managed isolation from September 2021 onwards. This move was in response to a labour shortage in the agricultural and horticulture sectors.

In late September, horticulture company Zespri had several of its kiwifruit products pulled from Chinese supermarket shelves after a batch of fruit being sold at a supermarket in China's Jiangsu province tested positive for COVID-19. In response, Zespri confirmed that it had launched emergency management plans and that the New Zealand Government was supporting its discussions with Chinese authorities.

=== Animal welfare ===
On 15 April 2020, Stuff reported that many pets included cats and dogs were stuck in transit at pet shipping companies and animal homes due to the disruption of travel caused by the coronavirus pandemic and lockdown in New Zealand. Due to lockdown restrictions, the transportation of pets is not deemed an essential service. Air New Zealand has announced that it would consider reopening its pet transportation service when Level 4 lockdown restrictions were lifted.

=== Aviation ===
==== 2020 ====
On 16 March, the national carrier Air New Zealand announced that it would be reducing its long-haul capacity by 85% and its personnel by 30% in response to declining demand and revenue as a result of the outbreak. In addition to the previously suspended flights to Shanghai and Seoul, the airline suspended flights to several major international cities including San Francisco, Houston, Buenos Aires, Vancouver, Tokyo, Honolulu, Denpasar, and Taipei between 30 March and 30 June as well as its London Heathrow–Los Angeles service. The airline also reduced trans-Tasman capacity by 80%, and the domestic network capacity would be reduced in March and April 2020. It would maintain enough overseas flights for returning New Zealanders and evacuees as well as essential air freight. On 20 March, the Government loaned Air New Zealand $900 million to protect essential air routes and to keep the company operating.

On 19 March, it was reported that Qantas and Jetstar were suspending their New Zealand operations as part of their efforts to suspend international flights in response to the COVID-19 pandemic.

On 25 March, Air New Zealand's chief revenue officer announced the airline would cut back to just ten international and fifth-freedom routes from 30 March to 1 May: from Auckland to Sydney, Brisbane, Melbourne, Rarotonga, Nadi, Niue, Los Angeles and Hong Kong, and from Norfolk Island to Sydney and Brisbane. The Auckland to Shanghai route would resume on 2 May.

On 4 April, it became known that Virgin Australia had decided to shut down its New Zealand operation permanently, resulting in 600 jobs in New Zealand to be lost.

On 7 April, it was reported that Air New Zealand was considering laying off 387 pilots as part of cutback measures. The New Zealand Air Line Pilots' Association (NZALPA), which represents 1520 Air New Zealand pilots, is currently in negotiations with the airline to reduce the number of layoffs.

On 20 May, Air New Zealand announced that it would be laying off 3,500 personnel. This includes 1,300 cabin crew. 950 long and mid-haul crew will lose their jobs while 300 workers will be made redundant in Auckland, Wellington, and Christchurch. In addition, 97 jobs were lost at Air NZ's regional airlines Air Nelson and Mount Cook Airline.

In early June, Singapore Airlines announced that it would resume passenger flights to Auckland and Christchurch on a weekly basis. On 10 June, it was reported that Singapore Airlines staff were being quarantined in hotel rooms for the duration of their three-day stay. In mid-June, Air New Zealand announced that it would be resuming flights between Auckland and Shanghai from 22 June.

On 5 July, Air New Zealand attracted criticism after it removed 11 passengers from an overcrowded flight to Brisbane and erroneously told them they would have to pay for their accommodation, meals and other quarantine costs until the next flight was ready to depart on Tuesday. Police were called to mediate between airline staff and passengers. Air New Zealand subsequently apologised for providing the passengers with incorrect information.

On 3 August, Auckland International Airport announced that it would be splitting its international terminal into separate zones for travellers from "safe travel hubs" and "health management" areas in anticipation for the establishment of a safe air corridor between New Zealand and the Cook Islands.

On 12 August, following several recent community transmissions, it was announced that all passengers leaving Auckland Airport would be issued with masks while passengers entering Auckland would be required to wear masks. Access to Auckland Airport would be limited to those with valid tickets, travel itineraries and travelling overseas. Social distancing would also be re-introduced at airports across the country.

On 15 August, Jetstar suspended its domestic operations in New Zealand after the Government implemented social distancing rules following a second outbreak in Auckland that month.

On 14 September, Jetstar announced that it was resuming domestic flights in New Zealand after Prime Minister Ardern announced that physical distancing on aircraft was no longer required. The airline had suspended its domestic services in New Zealand four weeks earlier following an outbreak in Auckland in mid-August 2020.

==== 2021 ====
In early January 2021, Air New Zealand announced that its first quarantine-free flight would depart from Auckland to Brisbane on 7 January 2021. Passengers travelling from New Zealand to Brisbane would not need to enter into quarantine if they filled in an Australian Travel Declaration saying they have been in New Zealand for 14 days.

On 25 January, Air New Zealand required passengers on its international flights to wear masks due to New Zealand's COVID-19 rules.

On 23 April, Air New Zealand cancelled a flight between Auckland and Perth after the West Australian capital entered into a three-day lockdown following a local COVID-19 outbreak.

Following a community outbreak of the Delta variant in Auckland and the Coromandel Peninsula in 17 August, Prime Minister Ardern announced that people would have 48 hours to return home. Air New Zealand also announced that it would continue to operate its regular schedule for the next 48 hours in order to enable customers to return to their place of residence. On 19 August, Air New Zealand CEO Greg Foran asked the Government to extend its 48-hour deadline due to the high demand for flights from Queenstown to Auckland.

On 26 August, Air New Zealand reported a net loss of NZ$289 million due to closed borders and disrupted services caused by the COVID-19 pandemic. The airline had already used up NZ$350 million of its $1.5 billion stand-by loan from the Government.

On 3 October, Air New Zealand CEO Greg Foran confirmed that the airline would be requiring all passengers on its international flights to be fully vaccinated against COVID-19 from 1 February 2022.

On 10 October, Fiji Airways announced that it would resume flights to and from New Zealand from 1 December 2021. Passengers have to be fully vaccinated and will have to book a place in managed isolation and quarantine (MIQ).

In late October 2021, Air New Zealand's policy of cancelling domestic flights into early December due to Auckland border restrictions attracted criticism from customers. By 27 October, the Commerce Commission had received five complaints from passengers, citing difficulties in obtaining flights and travel disruptions.

On 22 November 2021, Air New Zealand announced that it was cancelling over a thousand end-of-the-year flights between Australia and New Zealand due to the Government's indication that it would not lift border restrictions in late 2021. This cancellation is estimated to affect 20,000 travellers.

==== 2022 ====
On 12 September, Air New Zealand announced that it would be dropping its facemask requirement from 11:59pm that night in response to the Government's decision to abandon the country's COVID-19 Protection Framework.

=== Construction sector ===
On 28 April 2020, it became known that steel company Steel & Tube would lose between 150 and 200 jobs in upcoming restructuring.

On 20 May, building company Fletcher Building announced it would be laying off at least 1,000 jobs in New Zealand and 500 jobs in Australia, amounting to ten per cent of their workforce. On 11 August, it was reported that Fletcher Building was expecting a loss of NZ$196 million for the year to June 2020 due to the pandemic.

=== Film industry ===
On 17 March, Jon Landau, the co-producer of the Avatar film sequels, announced that film production at the Wellington-based Stone Street Studios had been suspended in response to the pandemic. However, visual effects will continue at Weta Digital in Wellington. On 31 May 50 Avatar crew including Hollywood director James Cameron were granted entry into New Zealand under a special visa category for border exemptions for foreigners deemed essential to a project of "significant economic value."

On 12 August 2021, Amazon Studios announced that it would be moving its then-untitled The Lord of The Rings TV series from New Zealand to the United Kingdom after completing filming of the first season. Factors that played a role in the relocation of filming from NZ back to the UK included New Zealand's strict pandemic border management policies which created logistical problems for many international cast members (half of whom were British) and Amazon executives wanting to visit and monitor the production. In addition, Amazon Studios had also heavily invested in its UK studio space.

=== Financial services ===
On 1 July, ASB Bank announced it was closing nine branches in the major centres and that 25 branches will be moving to three-day weeks due to a shift in demand for online services. The branches that closed were Auckland Hospital, Parnell, Ronwood Avenue in Manukau City, Ellerslie and Mount Albert in Auckland, Waikato University in Hamilton, Papamoa in Bay of Plenty, Barrington in Christchurch and Mosgiel in Otago. The company will also hire 150 additional staff to provide specialist online support.

On 19 November, the Bank of New Zealand announced that it was closing 38 branches over the next seven months as a result of the economic effects of the COVID-19 pandemic.

=== Funeral services ===
Funeral directors have warned about a spike in violence as a result of people being unable to attend funerals for their loved ones during the Level 4 and Level 3 restrictions.

=== Hospitality sector ===
On 14 April 2020, it was reported that three parent shareholding companies of the Burger King franchise in New Zealand had gone into receivership, with KordaMentha appointed as receiver. It was hoped that Burger King would start trading again post-lockdown as its operating company was not in receivership.

On 11 May 2020, Skycity announced that it will be slashing 700 jobs as a result of the economic fallout of the pandemic. In April, the company had slashed 200 jobs.

In mid-September 2021, the fast food chain McDonald's drew criticism from the Unite Union for not ensuring adequate social distancing between staff and customers at their stores' drive-through windows. Under Alert Level 3 guidelines, there has to be a two-metre distance between staff and customers. Other fastfood chains including Restaurant Brands' subsidiaries KFC, Pizza Hut, Carl's Jr and Taco Bell close the window between staff and customers during payment. McDonald's spokesperson Simon Kenny responded that general security measures meant that Eftpos units were wired and secured, making it impossible to completely close the window. Unite Union national secretary John Crocker disputed Kenny's explanation and stated that he intended to pursue the matter with the WorkSafe regulatory body.

By 23 September 2021, the Restaurant Association's Chief executive Marisa Bidois estimated that about 1,000 hospitality businesses in New Zealand had been forced to close as a result of the COVID-19 pandemic since March 2020, representing the loss of about 13,000 jobs. The Restaurant Association also unveiled a "Future of Hospitality Roadmap" which called for the Government to continue the wage subsidy under Alert Level 2, a "lockout subsidy" providing businesses the equivalent of 50% of their weekly sales, a one-off "reopening payment", and various vouchers and incentives to encourage customers to support their local businesses. The Association also advocated "Dine out to Help Out" and "Dine and Discover NZ" campaigns, modelled after similar programs in the United Kingdom and Australia.

=== Maritime sector ===
In early June 2020, marine engineering company Airmex's managing director Steve Sullivan has warned that about 40 jobs maritime engineering jobs in Nelson are at risk due to the Government's policy of refusing entry to ships as a result of the COVID-19 pandemic. According to Sullivan, 40% of the company's revenue came from the international refit business. National MP Nick Smith has also called on the Government to lift the blanket ban on foreign ships, citing the case of the American Samoa–registered tuna fishing vessel Captain Vincent Gann, which was denied entry by Immigration New Zealand and asked to seek urgent repairs in Hawaii.

In late January 2021, it was reported that Immigration New Zealand had denied visas exemptions to 60 hospitality staff aboard the French cruise ship Le Lapérouse on the grounds that the hospitality workers needed to be New Zealanders. The cruise ship had been hired by the New Zealand–owned Wild Earth Travel company to run small expeditions around the country commencing 30 January. Wild Earth Travel Director Aaron Russ criticised the immigration department's decision, saying that this denial of visas jeopardised the travel plans of New Zealanders and that there was insufficient time to train replacement New Zealand hospitality staff. Immigration Minister Kris Faafoi defended Immigration New Zealand's decision, stating that Le Lapérouse should have waited for the department to process its crew's visa applications before sailing to New Zealand. As a result, the cruise line company Ponant cancelled all seven booked tours to New Zealand, with Ponant claiming that it would disrupt the travel plans of 650 New Zealanders and result in NZ$6 million in lost income for businesses.

=== Media ===
On 25 March 2020, Allied Press suspended the print circulation of most of its community and farming newspapers to comply with lockdown restrictions. However, its metropolitan newspaper Otago Daily Times was allowed to remain open since it was considered an essential service.

On 30 March 2020, NZME, which owns The New Zealand Herald and radio station Newstalk ZB, announced the closure of Radio Sport with immediate effect, due to the impact of the coronavirus on sport.

On 1 April, Mediaworks' Chief Executive Michael Anderson told staff to take a 15% wage cut to avoid redundancies.

On 2 April, Bauer Media Group announced that it would wind up its New Zealand magazine titles in direct response to magazines having been stopped from being published under the Level 4 restrictions. This will put an end to many iconic titles, including Woman's Day, New Zealand Woman's Weekly, the New Zealand Listener, The Australian Women's Weekly, North & South, Next, Metro, Air New Zealand's inflight magazine Kia Ora, and Your Home & Garden, leaving about 200 former employees unemployed. Bauer Media's Australian and NZ operations were subsequently acquired by Mercury Capital, which revived the company as Are Media in September 2020.

On 14 April, NZME announced that it was laying off 15% of its workforce (roughly 200 jobs) as a result of the economic fallout caused by the coronavirus.

On 16 April, Stuff Chief Executive Sinead Boucher asked staff earning more than $50,000 to take a 15% pay cut while the executive team will take a 25% pay cut. Boucher herself will take a 40% pay cut.

By 14 May, the Government had eased lockdown restrictions on most media organisations including Allied Press, allowing their community newspapers and magazines to resume operations.

On 25 May, MediaWorks' CEO Michael Anderson announced that the company would be eliminating 130 jobs in its sales, out-of-home, and radio divisions as a result of the economic effects of the COVID-19 pandemic.

On 12 June, it was reported that national broadcaster TVNZ was planning to cut 100 jobs over the next few weeks to save $10 million and that the company was looking for a new head of news to replace John Gillespie.

Following the Delta variant community outbreak in August 2021, Allied Press suspended publication of the Southland Express (Invercargill), the Cromwell Bulletin, The Star (Christchurch), and Christchurch community papers due to Alert Level 4 lockdown restrictions.

=== Retail sector ===
==== 2020 ====
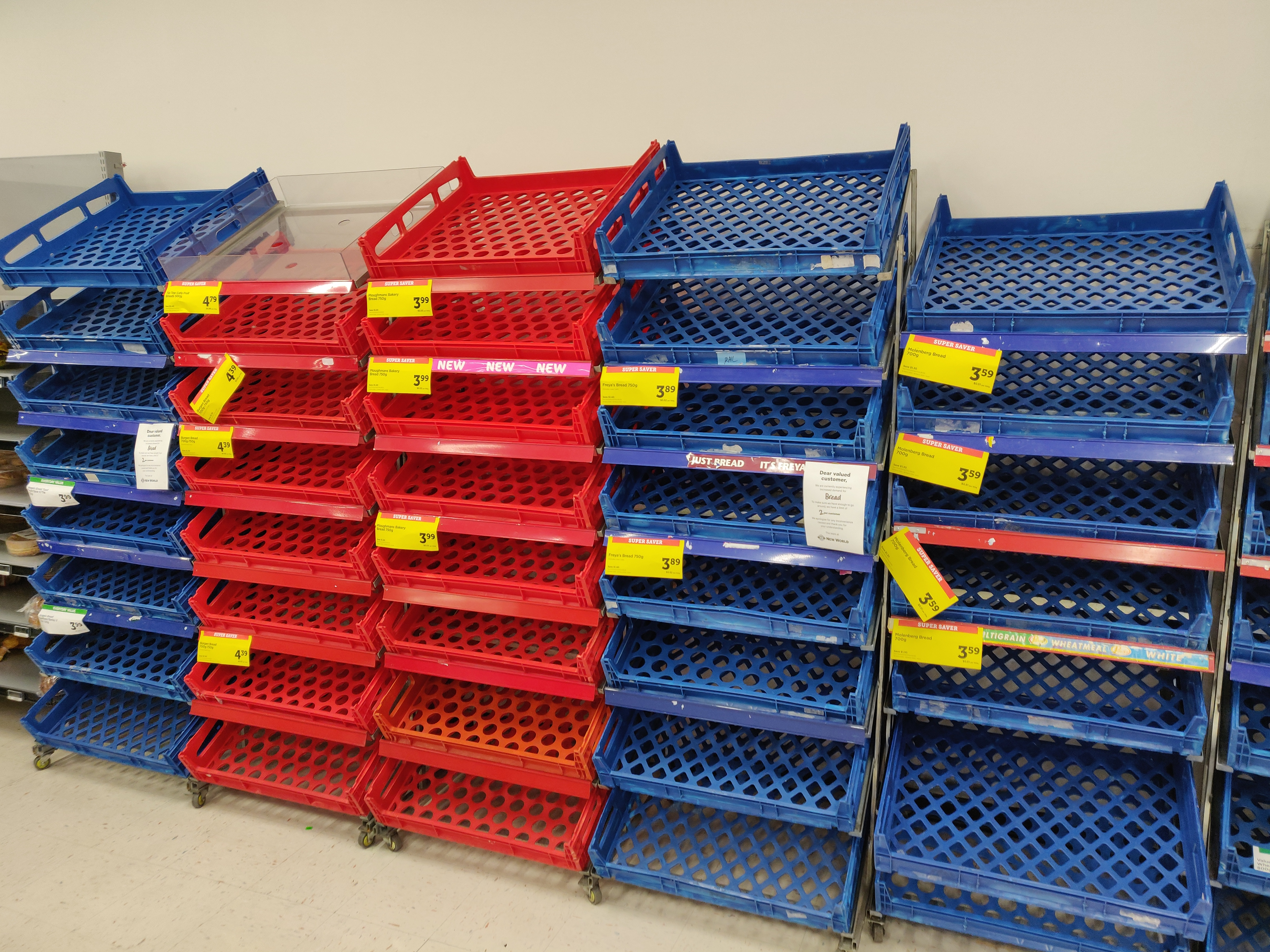
Empty bread shelves at a supermarket in Wellington after panic buying (22 March 2020)

Increased demand for face masks and hand sanitisers led to shortages nationwide in supermarkets and pharmacies. Following the first New Zealand case of COVID-19 on 28 February, customers were reportedly panic-buying supplies at Auckland supermarkets.

On 25 March 2020, The Warehouse Group prematurely announced that it was an "essential service" without consulting with the Government. When it was deemed not to be an essential service, The Warehouse shut down its brands including The Warehouse, Warehouse Stationery, Torpedo7, Noel Leeming, 1-day and TheMarket for the duration of the four-week lockdown, with all staff being put on full paid leave. The company also faced a fine of $500,000 if it was found to have breached the New Zealand Exchange's disclosure rules with more penalties if the company was found to have profited from a rise in its share price resulting from the announcement.

On 27 March, the national retail chain Mad Butcher was ordered to shut operations since it did not meet the Government's criteria of essential services. Mad-Butcher chief executive Michael Morton expressed frustration with a lack of clarity from the Ministry of Business, Innovation and Employment (MBIE). The company is projected to lose $3 million in meat.

On 10 April, hardware giant Mitre 10 announced that it would lay off staff at its Albany support centre in Auckland. While the company's Mitre 10 and Mitre 10 Mega stores are closed, customers can still order trade supplies for essential services online and by phone for contactless collection and home delivery.

On 12 May, hardware and DIY chain Bunnings announced that it will close seven stores in Ashburton, Hornby, Hastings, Cambridge, Rangiora, Te Awamutu, and Putāruru with the loss of 145 jobs.

On 25 May, it was reported that the department store chain H & J Smith was considering closing its stores in Dunedin, Mosgiel, Balclutha, Te Anau, and Gore as well as the Armoury Store in Dunedin and Outdoor World in Queenstown. The Take Note store in Gore would relocate but H & J Smith's stores in Invercargill and Queenstown would remain open. A final decision will be made in early June. Dunedin and Clutha Mayors Aaron Hawkins and Bryan Cadogan have urged the company to reconsider their closure plans.

On 8 June, The Warehouse Group announced that it would be laying off 1,080 jobs and close down six stores including The Warehouse stores in Whangaparaoa, Johnsonville, Dunedin, the Warehouse Stationery in Te Awamutu, and the Noel Leeming stores in Henderson, Tokoroa, and two stores in Christchurch (The Palms and Papanui). In response, First Union coordinator for The Warehouse Kate Davis criticised The Warehouse Group for not consulting with its workers, a charge that the company has denied.

On 20 July, the Warehouse CEO Pejman Okhovat announced that it could cut between 500 and 750 jobs as part of a proposed restructuring of the company. First Union general secretary Dennis Maga has criticised the company for using COVID-19 as an excuse to lay off hundreds of workers and to reduce the incomes of thousands of workers.

On 19 August, the supermarket chain Countdown temporarily closed two of its Auckland stores for cleaning after health authorities confirmed they had been visited by two individuals who had tested positive for COVID-19. On 22 August, Countdown shut down two more of its supermarkets in Auckland for cleaning after health authorities confirmed that an infected individual had visited those stores.

On 26 August 2020, stationery supply company OfficeMax announced that it would be closing all 14 of its New Zealand branches and shift operations online in response to growing online usage and the economic effects of the COVID-19 pandemic.

On 8 September 2020, supermarket chain Countdown closed its New Lynn supermarket temporarily for a "deep clean" after an individual who tested positive for COVID-19 visited the store the previous Friday.

On 21 December, the Warehouse Group announced that it would be repaying its NZ$67.8 million COVID-19 wage subsidy to the Government due to its "confident enough" final position.

==== 2021 ====
Following the Delta community outbreak in mid–August 2021, there were reports of panic buying at several supermarkets including Countdown's Dunedin stores at Mailer Street and Dunedin South. In late August 2021, the two major supermarket companies Foodstuffs and Countdown drew criticism from the public for alleged price hiking during the Auckland 2021 lockdown, which the companies denied.

On 18 August, multi-channel retailer EziBuy announced a restructure after posting a NZ$28.9 million loss for the year to June 2021.

On 20 August 2021, the Countdown supermarket chain announced that it would be changing its store hours from 8am to 9pm in order to give its teams enough time to restock their shelves following a Delta variant community outbreak in Auckland. In addition, four Auckland stores in Lynfield, Takapuna, Lincoln Road and Botany reduced their store hours after several team members had to isolate following COVID-19 positive visits to their stores. In addition, the Countdown in Birkenhead closed until 31 August after team members from several shifts had to isolate. Countdown also temporarily closed its Auckland Metro stores to allow team members from these stores to support their other stores.

On 26 August, Stuff also reported that elderly shoppers were being asked to queue outside Countdown's Tipukanga store in Northland since the manager did not want too many people in the store on "gold card day," where the chain offers a five percent discount to customers aged 65 years and above who present their SuperGold cards.

The Alert Level 4 lockdown implemented in response to the August Delta outbreak created financial difficulties for butcheries, which were not considered an essential service under Level 4 restrictions. In addition, butcheries are allowed to perform contactless delivery services but not "click and collect" delivery services under Level 4. In response, Retail Meat New Zealand launched a petition calling for the Government to allow butcheries to open under Alert Level 4. This petition was supported by Beef and Lamb NZ chief executive Kit Arkwright and Federated Farmers' Wairarapa meat and wool chair and National Party candidate Mike Butterick. In early September, Stuff reported that Remuera butcher Richard Hogg was offering "click-and-collect" services to customers in defiance of Level 4 lockdown rules in Auckland. On 9 September, Police ordered Hogg to cease offering "click and collect" services.

In mid October 2021, Statistics New Zealand reported there was a 0.9% increase (NZ$45 million; US$31.2 million) in retail card spending following the relaxation of lockdown restrictions in September; amounting to a total of NZ$104 million (US$72.2 million). While card spending on furniture, hardware and appliances increased by 17.5%, spending on groceries and liquor decreased by 3.5%.

==== 2022 ====
After the Government announced on 23 January 2022 that New Zealand would enter into the "red setting" of the COVID-19 Protection Framework, the two major supermarket chains Countdown and Foodstuffs reported incidents of panic buying at their Auckland supermarkets.

=== Sports and recreation ===
On 22 October, the North Shore gym "Snap Fitness" closed for five days after a person who later tested positive for COVID-19 visited the premises.

=== Telecommunications providers ===
On 14 April 2020, telco 2degrees announced that it was to cut the workforce by 10% (i.e. 120 staff), stop recruitment, and reduce spending on capital projects.

On 10 September, pay television company Sky reported a loss of NZ$175 million, down 74% the previous year, after it wrote-down the value of its assets by $178m to reflect the economic uncertainty caused by the COVID-19 pandemic. While commercial and advertising revenue was affected by the pandemic, revenue from streaming was up by 35 per cent, contributing to an overall revenue figure of NZ$747.6 million. The company had also laid off 200 workers (roughly 18%) of its workforce since June 2019.

On 20 April 2021, telecommunications provider Vodafone was criticised after it issued a memo warning staff members they faced the risk of termination if a border closure meant they were stuck in Australia. The company's head of external affairs Rich Llewellyn subsequently apologised for the wording of the memo.

=== Tourism ===
The imposition of border restrictions has had a major effect on the international tourism sector. For the month of February 2020, the number of international visitors arriving in New Zealand fell 11% compared to February 2019, mostly driven by a 90% drop in visitors from mainland China. In March 2020, international visitor arrivals fell 54% compared to March 2019.

On 8 April 2020, travel company Flight Centre announced that it would close 58 stores permanently. Flight Centre also announced that it was laying off 300 employees temporarily and 250 employees permanently.

In early May, Stuff reported that thousands of migrant workers have been left unemployed in the tourist town of Queenstown with no money for food or rent. According to Queenstown-Lakes District mayor Jim Boult, 6,000 migrants had requested welfare assistance from local authorities.

On 25 June, it was reported that bungy jumping company AJ Hackett Bungy had been able to save 20 jobs as a result of a $10.2 million bail-out package from the government. This package also allows the company to reopen 13 of its branches in Queenstown, Auckland, and Taupo.

By late October 2022, Tourism Minister Stuart Nash confirmed that tourist numbers had rebounded following the lifting of COVID-19 border restrictions that year. By that time, over 10,000 working holiday visa holders had arrived in the country while international tourists' spending had reached 88% of pre-COVID levels by the end of September 2022. That same month, COVID-19 modeller Dr Emily Harvey expressed concern that the return of cruiser ships to New Zealand could lead to an increased risk of COVID-19 infections at ports such as Picton. On 26 October, the Ovation of the Seas, which docked at Picton, had confirmed that 129 passengers and two crew members had tested positive for COVID-19.
