= Chedworth Park =

Suburb of Hamilton, New Zealand

- Suburb
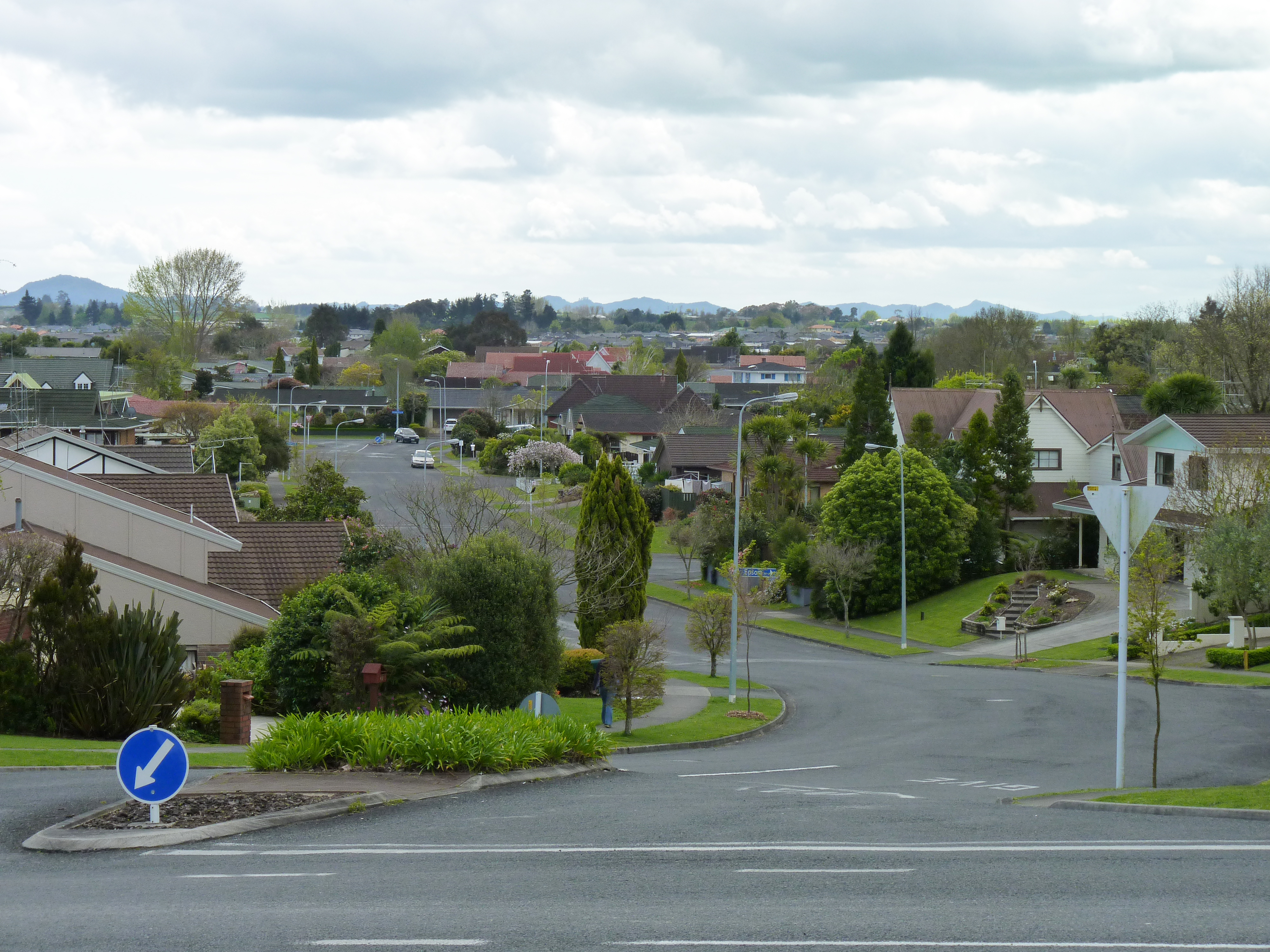
- A neighbourhood in Chedworth, Hamilton.
- Interactive map of Chedworth Park
- Coordinates: 37°45′5.93″S 175°17′15.34″E
- Country: New Zealand
- City: Hamilton, New Zealand
- Local authority: Hamilton City Council
- Electoral ward: East Ward
- Established: 1974

Area
  - Land: 88 ha (220 acres)

Population (June 2025)
  - Total: 2,120
  - Density: 2,400/km^{2} (6,200/sq mi)

Queenwood	Huntington	Puketaha
Chartwell	Chedworth Park	Eureka
Fairfield	Enderley	Fairview Downs

Chedworth Park, also known simply as Chedworth, is a suburb in eastern Hamilton in New Zealand. It was defined as a suburb of Hamilton in 1974.

Chedworth was named by Chedworth Park Co. Ltd in 1963. In 1959 they bought 111 acres (45 ha) for subdivision. Chedworth Properties later created over 4,000 sections in Sherwood Park, Rototuna, Greenhill Park, Hillcrest and Fairview.

Chedworth has 3 playgrounds, Chedworth Park, Hillary Park and Hukanui Oaks.

== Demographics ==
Chedworth covers 0.88 km^{2} (0.34 sq mi) and has an estimated population of 2,120 as of June 2025, with a population density of 2,409 people per km^{2}.

Historical population
Year	Pop.	±% p.a.
2006	1,722	—
2013	1,716	−0.05%
2018	1,821	+1.19%
2023	1,923	+1.10%

Chedworth had a population of 1,923 in the 2023 New Zealand census, an increase of 102 people (5.6%) since the 2018 census, and an increase of 207 people (12.1%) since the 2013 census. There were 918 males, 996 females and 9 people of other genders in 678 dwellings. 2.5% of people identified as LGBTIQ+. The median age was 36.1 years (compared with 38.1 years nationally). There were 417 people (21.7%) aged under 15 years, 354 (18.4%) aged 15 to 29, 846 (44.0%) aged 30 to 64, and 303 (15.8%) aged 65 or older.

People could identify as more than one ethnicity. The results were 68.2% European (Pākehā); 16.7% Māori; 4.4% Pasifika; 19.7% Asian; 1.7% Middle Eastern, Latin American and African New Zealanders (MELAA); and 2.5% other, which includes people giving their ethnicity as "New Zealander". English was spoken by 93.6%, Māori language by 5.1%, Samoan by 0.6%, and other languages by 20.6%. No language could be spoken by 2.5% (e.g. too young to talk). New Zealand Sign Language was known by 0.5%. The percentage of people born overseas was 29.6, compared with 28.8% nationally.

Religious affiliations were 34.8% Christian, 2.2% Hindu, 2.0% Islam, 1.2% Māori religious beliefs, 0.8% Buddhist, 0.6% New Age, and 2.0% other religions. People who answered that they had no religion were 50.4%, and 6.1% of people did not answer the census question.

Of those at least 15 years old, 516 (34.3%) people had a bachelor's or higher degree, 702 (46.6%) had a post-high school certificate or diploma, and 282 (18.7%) people exclusively held high school qualifications. The median income was $43,500, compared with $41,500 nationally. 177 people (11.8%) earned over $100,000 compared to 12.1% nationally. The employment status of those at least 15 was that 777 (51.6%) people were employed full-time, 219 (14.5%) were part-time, and 30 (2.0%) were unemployed.

== See also ==
- List of streets in Hamilton
- Suburbs of Hamilton, New Zealand
