= Fairview Downs =

Suburb of Hamilton, New Zealand

- Suburb
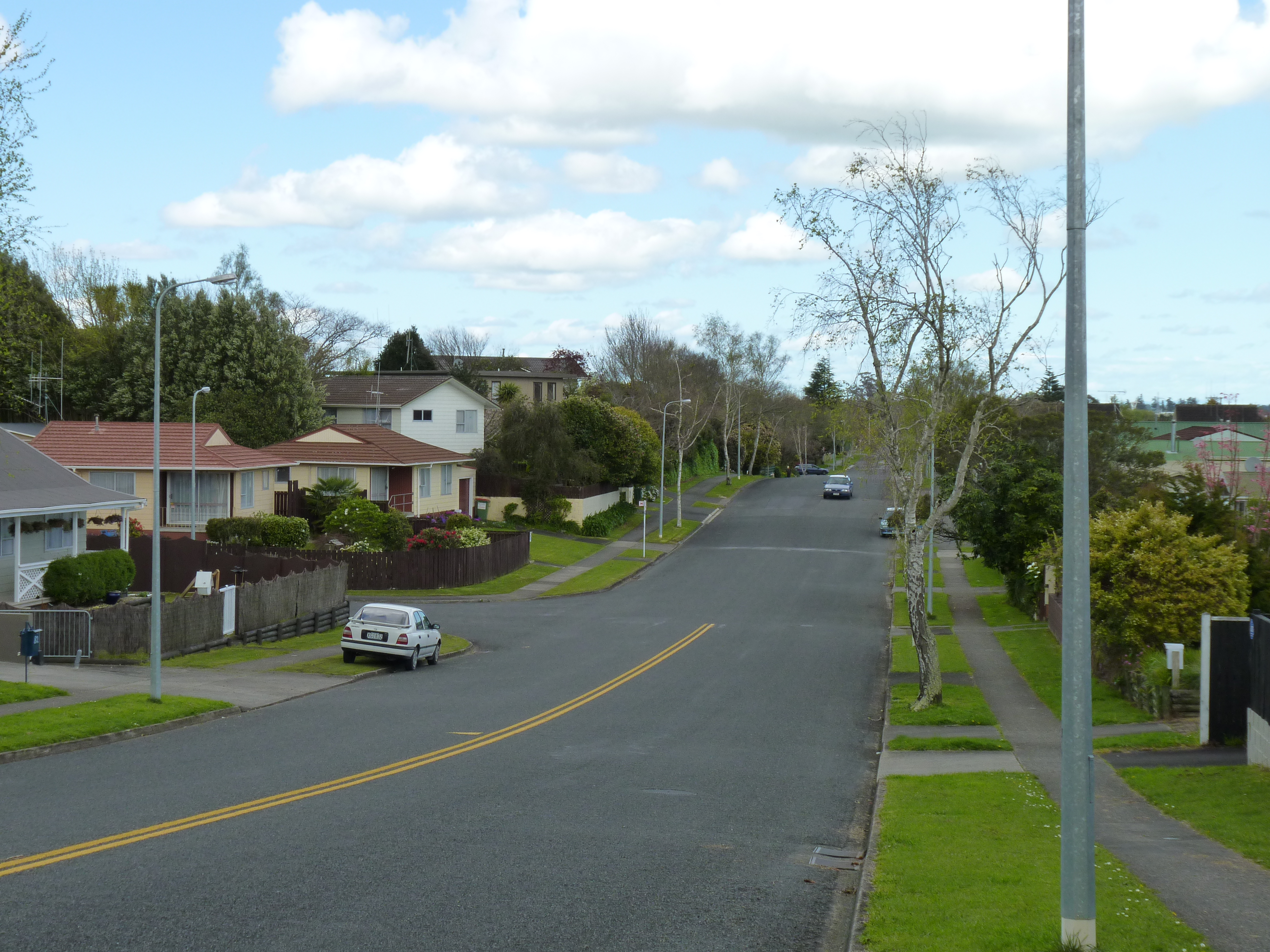
- A neighbourhood in Fairview Downs, Hamilton.
- Interactive map of Fairview Downs
- Coordinates: 37°45′45.87″S 175°18′21.62″E
- Country: New Zealand
- City: Hamilton, New Zealand
- Local authority: Hamilton City Council
- Electoral ward: East Ward
- Established: 1970s

Area
  - Land: 112 ha (280 acres)

Population (June 2025)
  - Total: 3,640
  - Density: 3,250/km^{2} (8,420/sq mi)

| Chedworth Park | Gordonton | Puketaha |
| Chartwell | Fairview Downs | Newstead |
| Enderley | Greenhill Park | Silverdale |

Fairview Downs is a suburb in eastern Hamilton in New Zealand.

It was developed in stages.

Tramway Road, the western boundary of Fairview, was shown as a proposed tramway on an 1865 map. It seems to have been of double width to accommodate a tramway to Cambridge and to have first been discussed by Kirikiriroa Road Board in 1872, though clearing and gravelling didn't start until 1891 and metalling was continuing in 1925. Hamilton Libraries say it was a crown grant and named c. 1890 – 1900 by civic leaders, surveyors and citizens, because there was a tramway in the vicinity.

Carrs Road was named in 1917 by the Carr family who owned it. Alderson Road was named between 1936 and 1940 by A.J. Thompson, the subdivider, after the Alderson family who originally owned the land.

The area south of Powells Road was developed in 1962 by D.M. McKenzie.

Fairview Street was named in 1967 by Alf Steel, the developer, who wanted a name that made the area sound more attractive. A developer bought the farm to the south in 1967. Fairview, to the north of Powells Road, was turned into housing between 1970 and 1974 by Peerless Homes Ltd.

== Demographics ==
Fairview Downs covers 1.12 km^{2} (0.43 sq mi) and had an estimated population of 3,640 as of June 2025, with a population density of 3,250 people per km^{2}.

Historical population
| Year | Pop. | ±% p.a. |
|---|---|---|
| 2006 | 2,976 | — |
| 2013 | 2,982 | +0.03% |
| 2018 | 3,201 | +1.43% |
| 2023 | 3,402 | +1.23% |

Fairview Downs had a population of 3,402 in the 2023 New Zealand census, an increase of 201 people (6.3%) since the 2018 census, and an increase of 420 people (14.1%) since the 2013 census. There were 1,692 males, 1,695 females and 15 people of other genders in 1,098 dwellings. 3.5% of people identified as LGBTIQ+. The median age was 31.2 years (compared with 38.1 years nationally). There were 789 people (23.2%) aged under 15 years, 825 (24.3%) aged 15 to 29, 1,482 (43.6%) aged 30 to 64, and 309 (9.1%) aged 65 or older.

People could identify as more than one ethnicity. The results were 59.3% European (Pākehā); 29.9% Māori; 9.5% Pasifika; 17.3% Asian; 3.5% Middle Eastern, Latin American and African New Zealanders (MELAA); and 1.4% other, which includes people giving their ethnicity as "New Zealander". English was spoken by 93.7%, Māori language by 9.4%, Samoan by 0.8%, and other languages by 17.5%. No language could be spoken by 3.3% (e.g. too young to talk). New Zealand Sign Language was known by 0.7%. The percentage of people born overseas was 25.2, compared with 28.8% nationally.

Religious affiliations were 29.5% Christian, 3.4% Hindu, 3.3% Islam, 1.9% Māori religious beliefs, 1.5% Buddhist, 0.4% New Age, 0.1% Jewish, and 2.5% other religions. People who answered that they had no religion were 51.0%, and 6.7% of people did not answer the census question.

Of those at least 15 years old, 684 (26.2%) people had a bachelor's or higher degree, 1,347 (51.5%) had a post-high school certificate or diploma, and 579 (22.2%) people exclusively held high school qualifications. The median income was $44,500, compared with $41,500 nationally. 192 people (7.3%) earned over $100,000 compared to 12.1% nationally. The employment status of those at least 15 was that 1,473 (56.4%) people were employed full-time, 303 (11.6%) were part-time, and 105 (4.0%) were unemployed.

The 2013 Index of Socioeconomic Deprivation, ranked 1-10 from lowest to most deprived areas, lists Fairview Downs at 8/10 (moderate deprivation).

Fairview Downs census area lost and gained a few small areas on its western fringe in 2018. The population has increased slowly. They are younger than the 37.4 years of the national average, but close to the national median income, with more than double Hamilton's Māori average of 23.7%, as shown below (2013 boundary figures in brackets) -

| Year | Population | Median age | Households | Median income | National median income |
|---|---|---|---|---|---|
| 1996 | (2,547) | | (855) | | |
| 2001 | (3,114) | (28.5) | (1,032) | ($20,300) | $18,500 |
| 2006 | 2,976 (3,333) | (29) | (1,110) | ($25,500) | $24,100 |
| 2013 | 2,982 (3,330) | (29.4) | (1,110) | ($28,100) | $27,900 |
| 2018 | 3,201 | 30.4 | 1,029 | $31,700 | $31,800 |
| 2023 | 3,402 | 31.2 | 1,098 | $44,500 | $41,500 |

== See also ==
- List of streets in Hamilton
- Suburbs of Hamilton, New Zealand
