= Fairfield, Hamilton =

Suburb of Hamilton, New Zealand

Fairfield
- Suburb
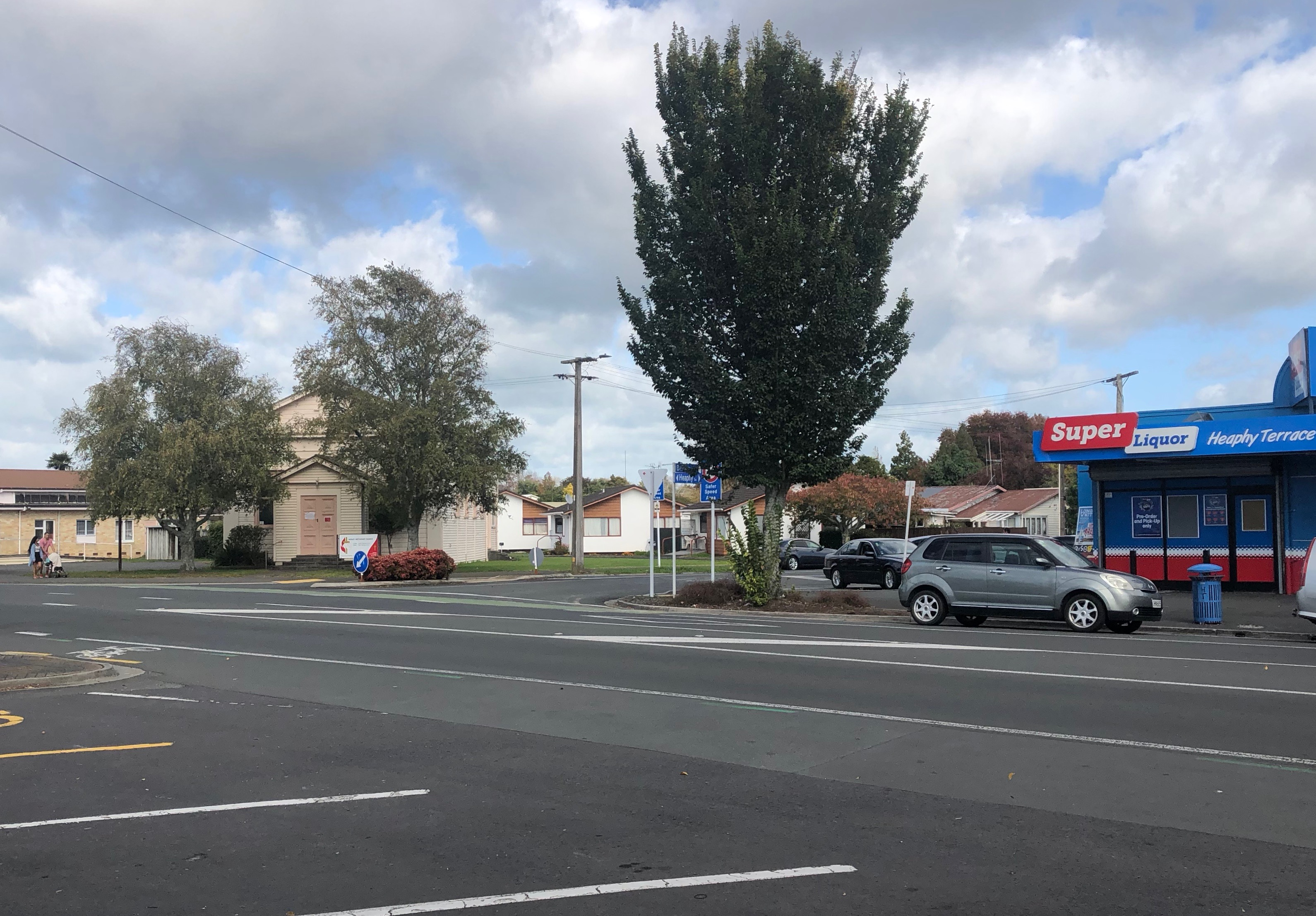
- Fairfield Methodist Church and liquor store, Heaphy Terrace
- Interactive map of Fairfield
- Coordinates: 37°46′07″S 175°16′40″E
- Country: New Zealand
- City: Hamilton, New Zealand
- Local authority: Hamilton City Council
- Electoral ward: East Ward
- Established: 1949

Area
  - Land: 348 ha (860 acres)

Population (June 2025)
  - Total: 8,580
  - Density: 2,470/km^{2} (6,390/sq mi)

Te Rapa	Chartwell	Chedworth Park
River Road	Fairfield	Fairview Downs
Central Hamilton	Claudelands	Enderley

Fairfield is a suburb to the northeast of central Hamilton, New Zealand. Fairfield is named after the dairy farm of John Davies, who bought 100 acres (0.40 km2) from F. R. Claude. This area experienced rapid growth in the 1950s and 60s.

== History ==
Fairfield is named after the dairy farm of John Davies, who bought 100 acres (0.40 km^{2}) from F. R. Claude. This area experienced rapid growth in the 1950s and 60s.

== Features of Fairfield ==
=== Fairfield Bridge ===
Fairfield Bridge crosses the Waikato River and connects Fairfield with suburbs west of the river. It is a 457-foot (139 m) reinforced concrete road bridge, and well-known landmark. The bridge was built by Caesar Roose in 1936. It has a twin further north on the Waikato River at Tuakau.

== Demographics ==
Fairfield covers 3.48 km^{2} (1.34 sq mi) and had an estimated population of 8,580 as of June 2025, with a population density of 6,129 people per km^{2}.

Historical population
Year	Pop.	±% p.a.
2006	6,939	—
2013	7,167	+0.46%
2018	7,566	+1.09%
2023	7,986	+1.09%

Fairfield had a population of 7,986 in the 2023 New Zealand census, an increase of 420 people (5.6%) since the 2018 census, and an increase of 819 people (11.4%) since the 2013 census. There were 3,843 males, 4,089 females and 57 people of other genders in 2,775 dwellings. 3.9% of people identified as LGBTIQ+. The median age was 32.8 years (compared with 38.1 years nationally). There were 1,725 people (21.6%) aged under 15 years, 1,908 (23.9%) aged 15 to 29, 3,363 (42.1%) aged 30 to 64, and 987 (12.4%) aged 65 or older.

People could identify as more than one ethnicity. The results were 62.1% European (Pākehā); 31.1% Māori; 9.4% Pasifika; 11.2% Asian; 3.5% Middle Eastern, Latin American and African New Zealanders (MELAA); and 1.8% other, which includes people giving their ethnicity as "New Zealander". English was spoken by 93.9%, Māori language by 9.1%, Samoan by 1.7%, and other languages by 14.2%. No language could be spoken by 2.8% (e.g. too young to talk). New Zealand Sign Language was known by 0.6%. The percentage of people born overseas was 22.2, compared with 28.8% nationally.

Religious affiliations were 32.5% Christian, 1.7% Hindu, 3.2% Islam, 2.4% Māori religious beliefs, 0.7% Buddhist, 0.7% New Age, and 2.7% other religions. People who answered that they had no religion were 50.4%, and 6.1% of people did not answer the census question.

Of those at least 15 years old, 1,695 (27.1%) people had a bachelor's or higher degree, 3,069 (49.0%) had a post-high school certificate or diploma, and 1,497 (23.9%) people exclusively held high school qualifications. The median income was $40,400, compared with $41,500 nationally. 684 people (10.9%) earned over $100,000 compared to 12.1% nationally. The employment status of those at least 15 was that 3,135 (50.1%) people were employed full-time, 810 (12.9%) were part-time, and 276 (4.4%) were unemployed.

A study based on the 2013 census said that the suburb was a deprived and below-average area, apart from housing.

Individual statistical areas
Name	Area (km^{2})	Population	Density (per km^{2})	Dwellings	Median age	Median income
Miropiko	2.08	3,306	1,589	1,218	37.9 years	$52,300
Fairfield North	0.74	2,412	3,259	756	29.8 years	$32,500
Fairfield South	0.66	2,268	3,436	804	30.4 years	$36,600
New Zealand					38.1 years	$41,500

== Education ==
Fairfield College is a state high school (years 9–13) with a roll of 973. The school was founded in 1958.

Fairfield Intermediate is a state intermediate (years 7–8) school. It has a roll of 896.

Fairfield Primary School and Woodstock School are contributing primary (years 1–6) state schools. They have rolls of 339 and 385 students, respectively. Fairfield Primary opened in 1919. Woodstock School was founded in 1954.

St. Joseph's Catholic School is a state-integrated full primary school (years 1–8) with a roll of 338.

All these schools are coeducational. Rolls are as of July 2026.

== See also ==
- List of streets in Hamilton
- Suburbs of Hamilton, New Zealand
