= Enderley =

Suburb of Hamilton, New Zealand

- Suburb
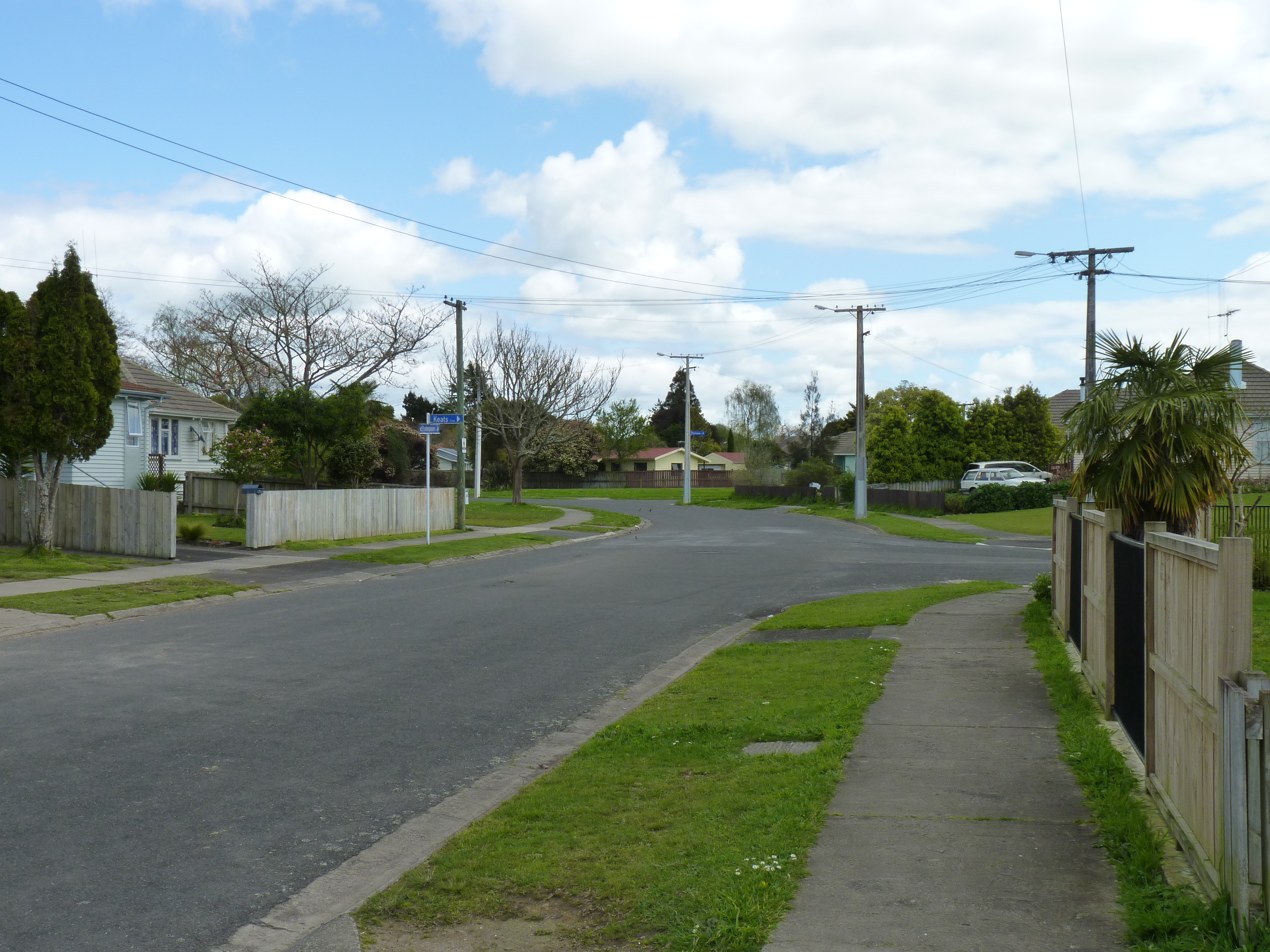
- Poets Corner in Enderley, Hamilton.
- Interactive map of Enderley
- Coordinates: 37°46′4.8″S 175°17′46.09″E
- Country: New Zealand
- City: Hamilton, New Zealand
- Local authority: Hamilton City Council
- Electoral ward: East Ward
- Established: 1949

Area
  - Land: 146 ha (360 acres)

Population (June 2025)
  - Total: 5,970
  - Density: 4,090/km^{2} (10,600/sq mi)

Chartwell	Chedworth Park
Fairfield	Enderley	Fairview Downs
Claudelands		Ruakura

Enderley is a suburb of Hamilton, New Zealand. It became a part of Hamilton in the 5th boundary extension in 1949. It is the highest ranking suburb for socio-economic deprivation in eastern Hamilton.

== Etymology ==
Enderley is named after a postman's 1899 house. Edward Shoard bought a small farm in 1899, east of Peachgrove Road, between what is now Southwell School and Enderley Avenue, and built a "capacious dwelling-house" called Enderley. It isn't clear why he chose that name, but possibly it was from an 1856 novel, set in an area near his native Bristol. In 1913 the farm was subdivided into 19 residential-sized properties and three streets, one of which was Enderley Avenue. Edward Shoard retired in 1915 after 31 years with the post office and may have moved to Grey Street where he lived in 1920. He moved to Auckland in 1929 and died in 1943.

== History ==
Tramway Road, the eastern boundary of Enderley, was shown as a proposed tramway on an 1865 map. It seems to have been of double width to accommodate a tramway to Cambridge and to have first been discussed by Kirikiriroa Road Board in 1872, though clearing and gravelling didn't start until 1891.

Insoll Avenue was named in 1908 after T.B. Insoll, the owner of the property and a former clerk to the then local council, Waikato County. John Street, Fifth and Enderley Avenues were created in 1913, Enderley being Muriel Street until 1915, when Halifax Street was added. There was little development until the 1920s, electricity being supplied from 1925.

From the start drainage was a problem, as it was in 1930 and remains a problem.

Poets' Corner (see below) was a 1959 Housing Corporation project. The area north of Insoll Road was another Housing Corporation development from 1964 to 1968.

The Orchard Avenue area was built in 1968, on the site of an orchard.

Also, there is a building project off Tramway Road, to the south-east in Ruakura, where 500 new homes will be built in the area for the new $3.3 billion transport hub being operated by Tainui Group Holdings (TGH). The area now has many middle income homeowners moving in and renovating the older properties as they are seen as good investments and solid first homes being from the 1960s and 1970s.

Around the Fifth Ave area of Enderley there are some streets that mainly have privately owned homes that have been renovated; as this has happened the streets have changed to become safer areas.

== Locations ==
=== Poets Corner ===
Enderley neighbourhood Poets' Corner (so called due to many of the streets being named after poets such as Tennyson, Wordsworth, Blake and Eliot) was developed by the Housing Corporation in 1959 and known for its high crime rate. New Zealand Post ceased deliveries to residential addresses in Enderley for a short time after a shootout between members of the Mongrel Mob and Black Power in 2007. After this happened Housing NZ pulled down all the state-owned houses that had been housing the gang members in 2009. Crime rates and gang membership have decreased in the last few years. There was a $17m housing project, rebuilding on the old Housing NZ site that was pulled down in 2009, which was planned to have a mix of rental and owned homes, but suffered setbacks in 2018 and 2019.

=== Five Cross Roads ===
Five Cross Roads is a shopping area on the edge of Poets' Corner. In 2018 it was expanded to take in a former plant nursery site.

=== Enderley Park ===
Enderley Park has a sports field and Enderley Park Community Centre.

== Demographics ==
Enderley covers 1.46 km^{2} (0.56 sq mi) and had an estimated population of 5,970 as of June 2025, with a population density of 4,089 people per km^{2}.

Historical population
Year	Pop.	±% p.a.
2006	4,476	—
2013	4,692	+0.68%
2018	5,256	+2.30%
2023	5,475	+0.82%

Enderley had a population of 5,475 in the 2023 New Zealand census, an increase of 219 people (4.2%) since the 2018 census, and an increase of 783 people (16.7%) since the 2013 census. There were 2,670 males, 2,784 females and 21 people of other genders in 1,794 dwellings. 3.7% of people identified as LGBTIQ+. The median age was 30.8 years (compared with 38.1 years nationally). There were 1,263 people (23.1%) aged under 15 years, 1,389 (25.4%) aged 15 to 29, 2,229 (40.7%) aged 30 to 64, and 591 (10.8%) aged 65 or older.

People could identify as more than one ethnicity. The results were 42.4% European (Pākehā); 45.3% Māori; 13.2% Pasifika; 15.0% Asian; 3.6% Middle Eastern, Latin American and African New Zealanders (MELAA); and 1.7% other, which includes people giving their ethnicity as "New Zealander". English was spoken by 93.5%, Māori language by 13.6%, Samoan by 2.6%, and other languages by 17.3%. No language could be spoken by 2.6% (e.g. too young to talk). New Zealand Sign Language was known by 0.7%. The percentage of people born overseas was 23.3, compared with 28.8% nationally.

Religious affiliations were 32.1% Christian, 3.8% Hindu, 3.6% Islam, 4.0% Māori religious beliefs, 1.0% Buddhist, 0.4% New Age, 0.1% Jewish, and 1.9% other religions. People who answered that they had no religion were 47.1%, and 6.7% of people did not answer the census question.

Of those at least 15 years old, 732 (17.4%) people had a bachelor's or higher degree, 2,115 (50.2%) had a post-high school certificate or diploma, and 1,362 (32.3%) people exclusively held high school qualifications. The median income was $32,800, compared with $41,500 nationally. 162 people (3.8%) earned over $100,000 compared to 12.1% nationally. The employment status of those at least 15 was that 1,908 (45.3%) people were employed full-time, 459 (10.9%) were part-time, and 276 (6.6%) were unemployed.

=== Individual census areas ===
Enderley includes two census areas, North and South. In 2018 the census area boundaries were reduced from the previous Insoll and Enderley. The Index of Socioeconomic Deprivation, ranked 1-10 from lowest to most deprived areas, listed Enderley and Insoll at 10/10 (highest level of deprivation) in 2013. The population is growing slowly, but they remain much poorer and younger than the 37.4 years of the national average, as shown below (2013 boundary figures in brackets) -

	North (formerly Insoll)				South (formerly Enderley)				National median income
Year	Population	Median age	Households	Median income	Population	Median age	Households	Median income	National median income
1996	(2,604)		(747)		(3,876)		(1,383)		
2001	(2,562)	(28.2)	(741)	($11,600)	(3,981)	(28.8)	(1,401)	($14,300)	$18,500
2006	2,238 (2,580)	(27.5)	(741)	($15,500)	2,238 (3,897)	(30.3)	(1,434)	($19,900)	$24,100
2013	2,241 (2,565)	(30.2)	(747)	($16,800)	2,451 (4,182)	(30.8)	(1,509)	($22,500)	$27,900
2018	2,523	29.2	693	$19,600	2,736	30.6	945	$22,100	$31,800
2023	2,481	30.7	756	$31,400	2,994	30.8	1,038	$34,000	$41,500

In 2023 the main ethnic groups were -

Area	European	Māori	Pacific	Asian
North	42.3%	47.9%	14.9%	12.8%
South	42.4%	43.2%	11.8%	16.7%

== Education ==
Insoll Avenue School is a state contributing primary school for years 1 to 6, with a roll of 309.

Te Wharekura o Kirikiriroa is a state composite school for years 1 to 13, with a roll of 308. It teaches in the Māori language. The name was gifted to the school in 2022 by Ngāti Wairere. Previously, the school name was Te Kura Kaupapa Māori o Te Ara Rima. The school opened in the 1980s, and was the first Kura Kaupapa Māori in Hamilton.

Both schools are coeducational. Rolls are as of July 2025.

== See also ==
- List of streets in Hamilton
- Suburbs of Hamilton, New Zealand
