= Silverdale, New Zealand =

Silverdale, New Zealand may refer to:

- Silverdale, Waikato, suburb of Hamilton
- Silverdale, Auckland
