= Fairfield Intermediate School =

Coordinates: 37°45′47″S 175°17′03″E

Fairfield Intermediate

Location
- Clarkin Road; Fairfield; Hamilton; New Zealand

Information
- School type: State Co-educational Intermediate Intermediate
- Motto: Whakaharahara ākonga - Whakaharahara wāhi (Exceptional Learners - Exceptional Place)
- Founded: 1963
- Ministry of Education Institution no.: 1715
- Principal: Angela Walters
- Years offered: 7-8
- Gender: Co-ed
- Age range: 10-13
- Classes: 30
- Average class size: 30
- Hours in school day: 6h 10m (8:45 to 2:55)
- Classrooms: 29
- Houses: Kauri, Nikau, Rimu, Kowhai, Totara and Puriri
- Nickname: FIS
- Socio-economic decile: 5
- Website: www.fairfieldintermediate.school.nz/

Fairfield Intermediate, sometimes shortened to FIS, is a year 7-8 school located in Fairfield, Hamilton, New Zealand. It has a roll of 896 as of July 2026 and has a decile rating of 5. The principal is Angela Walters.

== History ==
The school was founded in 1963 and was and still is the only school in North-East Hamilton that caters to year 7-8 students. The school has, for many years, gone to Port Waikato and Pauanui for school camps. This has been changed for the 2013 camps, where Pauanui is no longer used for the trips.

== Notable alumni ==
Notable alumni of Fairfield Intermediate include Stan Walker (2002–2003), an actor and Australian Idol-winning singer, and Scott Styris (1987–1988), an all-rounder who has played for the Black Caps and Northern Districts.

== Extracurricular activities ==
Fairfield Intermediate offers many opportunities in sport and music with yearly productions and successful sports teams. Their chess team has traditionally done well, winning many regional tournaments in the past few years. The school sends representatives to the AIMS Games every year and has come out with medals on a large number of occasions. The school runs a musical each year, having more than 150 students taking part. It also sends students to the annual BayMaths and WaiMaths mathematics competitions.

== Fairfield Cluster ==
The school is part of the Fairfield Cluster, in which comprises Fairfield Intermediate and its contributing schools, Bankwood, Hukanui, Rototuna, Woodstock, Te Totara. It also includes Southwell School and St Joseph's, Fairfield. The Fairfield Cluster runs many competitions and festivals together including, athletics and choir.

== Houses ==
The school has been traditionally divided into four houses named after the dominant peaks in the North Island; Ruapehu, Ngauruhoe, Tongariro and Taranaki. In 2012 however the house system was abolished due to people in the same class being in different houses, so a new team system was created. The system runs with one team being three or four full classes. The teams are named after New Zealand plants and are named: Nikau, Kauri, Rimu, Kowhai, Totara and Puriri.
