= Riverlea, New Zealand =

Suburb of Hamilton, New Zealand

Riverlea
- Suburb
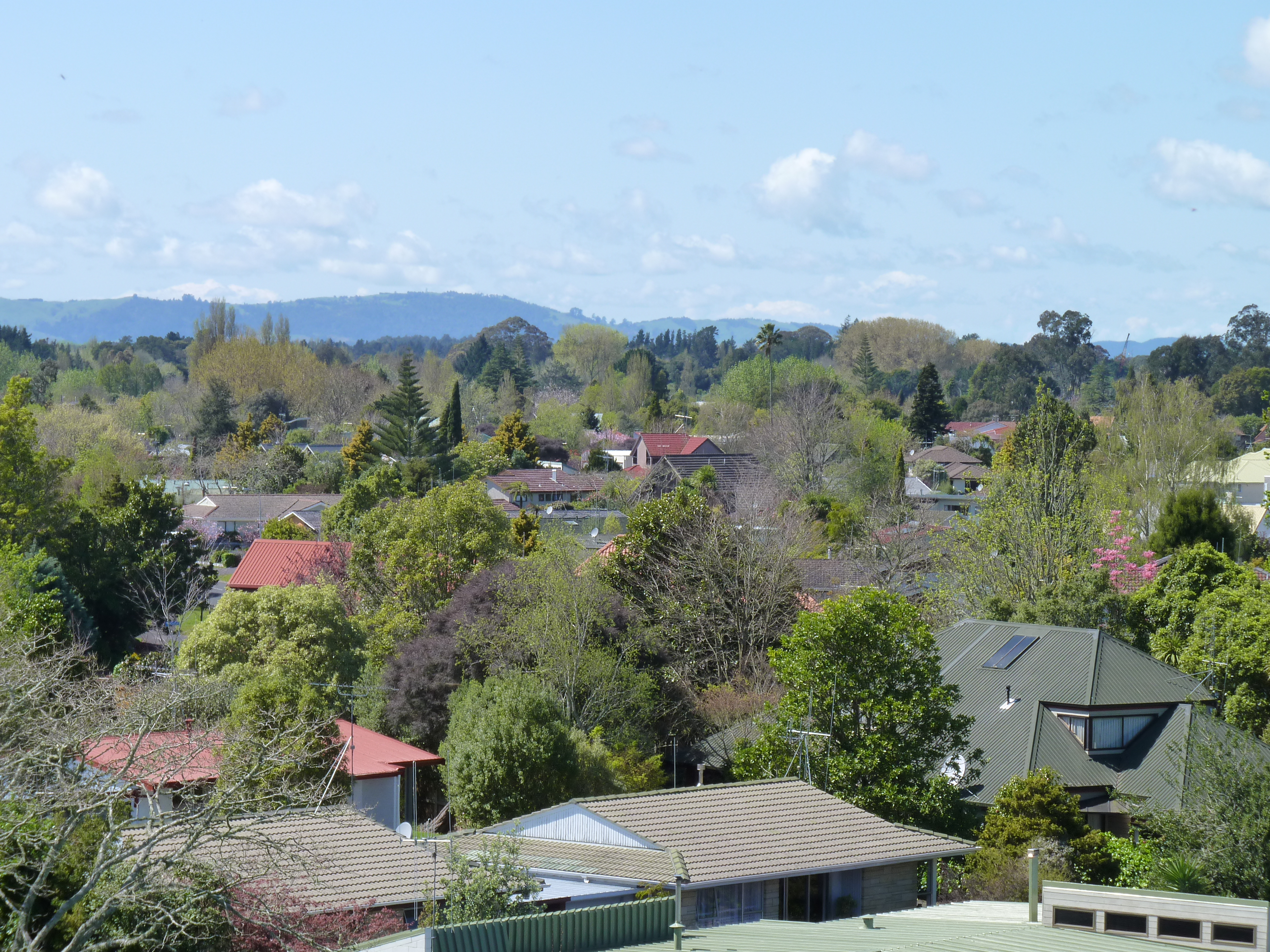
- Riverlea, Hamilton
- Interactive map of Riverlea
- Coordinates: 37.804308°S 175.320811°E
- Country: New Zealand
- City: Hamilton, New Zealand
- Local authority: Hamilton City Council
- Electoral ward: East Ward
- Established: 1962

Area
  - Land: 174 ha (430 acres)

Population (June 2025)
  - Total: 2,840
  - Density: 1,630/km^{2} (4,230/sq mi)

	Hillcrest & Silverdale
	Riverlea	Matangi
Peacocke		Tamahere

Riverlea is a suburb in south-eastern Hamilton in New Zealand. It is located south of Hillcrest. The suburb is primarily residential, with a small section of light industrial land along Riverlea Road.

== History ==
It is named after Riverlea House, the homestead on the property of James McPherson which covered most of modern-day Riverlea and Hillcrest. Many of the street names were chosen by landowner Don MacKenzie, which he named after aeroplanes he flew in the Second World War (Hudson Street, Lysander Place), his horses (McCracken Avenue, Silva Crescent, Sheriff Place) and his family (Norma Place, Malcolm Street, Louise Place). Johnsview Terrace was named in memory of a boy who drowned in a waterhole which the street overlooked.

== Features of Riverlea ==
=== Hammond Park ===
Hammond Park is a public park along the riverbank of the Waikato River. A boardwalk connects the different sections of the park. Hammond Bush, part of the Mangaonua Gully, is home to the rare New Zealand long-tailed bat. The beach along the Malcolm Street section of the park is a popular swimming spot during summer.

A local environmental improvement group (Riverlea Environment Society incorporated) has been instrumental in enhancing the Hammond Bush and campaigning against the building of an asphalt plant.

=== Riverlea Theatre ===
The Riverlea Theatre and Arts Centre, established in 1984, is home to Hamilton Musical Theatre and the Hamilton Playbox Repertory Society.

== Demographics ==
Riverlea covers 1.74 km^{2} (0.67 sq mi) and had an estimated population of 2,840 as of June 2025, with a population density of 1,632 people per km^{2}.

Historical population
Year	Pop.	±% p.a.
2006	2,532	—
2013	2,583	+0.29%
2018	2,775	+1.44%
2023	2,679	−0.70%

Riverlea had a population of 2,679 in the 2023 New Zealand census, a decrease of 96 people (−3.5%) since the 2018 census, and an increase of 96 people (3.7%) since the 2013 census. There were 1,323 males, 1,344 females and 15 people of other genders in 966 dwellings. 3.8% of people identified as LGBTIQ+. The median age was 39.5 years (compared with 38.1 years nationally). There were 552 people (20.6%) aged under 15 years, 492 (18.4%) aged 15 to 29, 1,218 (45.5%) aged 30 to 64, and 417 (15.6%) aged 65 or older.

People could identify as more than one ethnicity. The results were 70.8% European (Pākehā); 14.8% Māori; 2.2% Pasifika; 19.7% Asian; 3.5% Middle Eastern, Latin American and African New Zealanders (MELAA); and 2.0% other, which includes people giving their ethnicity as "New Zealander". English was spoken by 96.5%, Māori language by 4.4%, Samoan by 0.2%, and other languages by 20.8%. No language could be spoken by 1.1% (e.g. too young to talk). New Zealand Sign Language was known by 0.4%. The percentage of people born overseas was 32.4, compared with 28.8% nationally.

Religious affiliations were 29.6% Christian, 2.7% Hindu, 3.6% Islam, 1.2% Māori religious beliefs, 1.8% Buddhist, 0.4% New Age, 0.1% Jewish, and 1.2% other religions. People who answered that they had no religion were 54.6%, and 5.0% of people did not answer the census question.

Of those at least 15 years old, 831 (39.1%) people had a bachelor's or higher degree, 924 (43.4%) had a post-high school certificate or diploma, and 369 (17.3%) people exclusively held high school qualifications. The median income was $46,700, compared with $41,500 nationally. 318 people (15.0%) earned over $100,000 compared to 12.1% nationally. The employment status of those at least 15 was that 1,077 (50.6%) people were employed full-time, 336 (15.8%) were part-time, and 63 (3.0%) were unemployed.

The 2013 Index of Socioeconomic Deprivation, ranked 1-10 from lowest to most deprived areas, lists Riverlea at 4/10 (low deprivation).

== Education ==
Berkley Normal Middle School is a state co-educational composite school (years 7–9) with a roll of 766 as of March 2026. The school was founded as an intermediate school by the Department of Education (now known as the Ministry of Education) in 1971 and became a middle school (with the addition of year 9) in 1998.

== See also ==
- List of streets in Hamilton
- Suburbs of Hamilton, New Zealand
