= Cambridge Branch =

Rural railway line

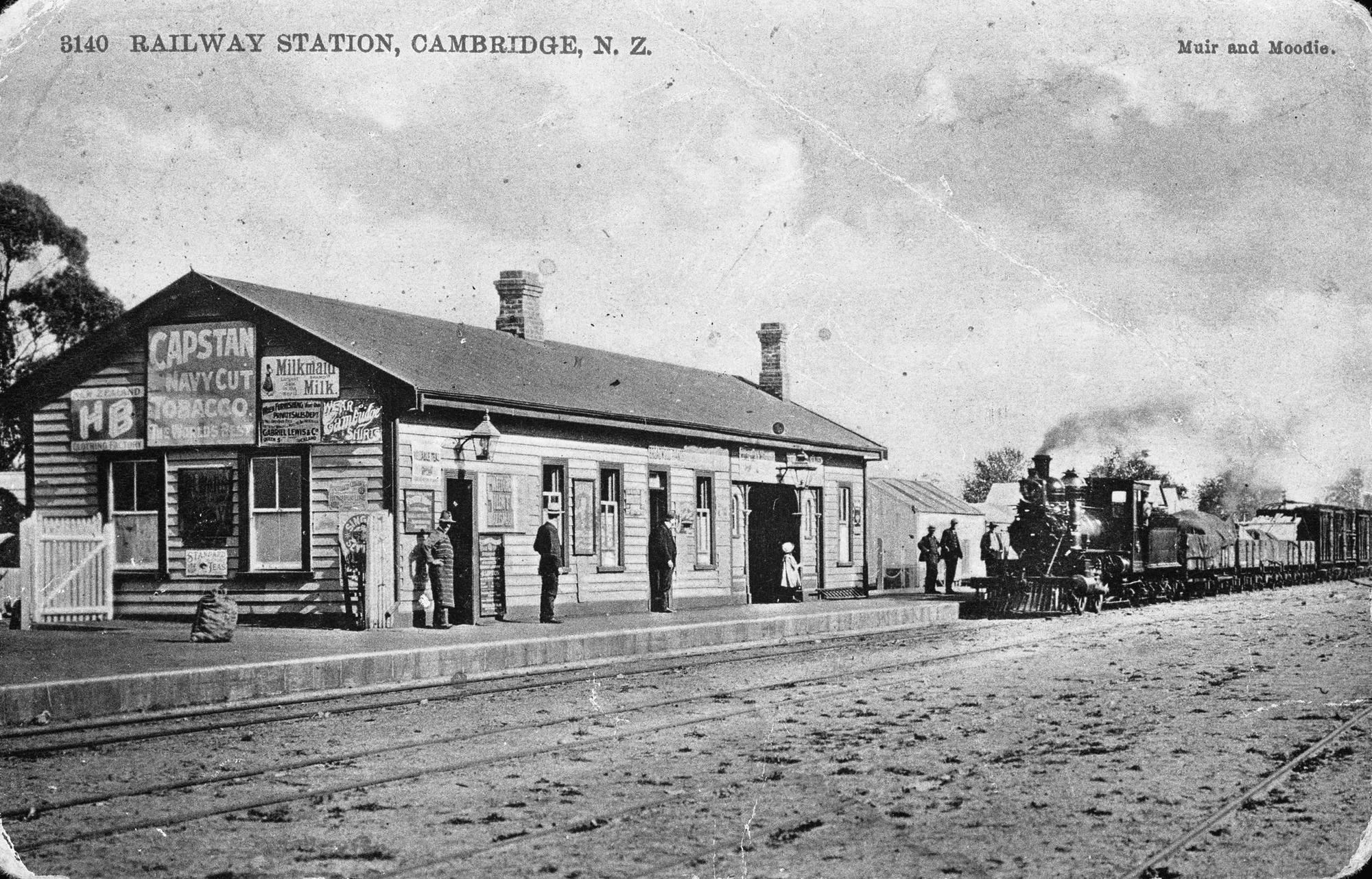
- Cambridge railway station around 1900. A verandah was added in 1909 for £65

Overview
- Other name(s): Hautapu Branch; Cambridge Industrial Siding; Cambridge/Hautapu Industrial Line
- Status: Open Ruakura – Hautapu, closed Hautapu – Cambridge
- Owner: KiwiRail
- Locale: Waikato
- Termini: Ruakura, East Coast Main Trunk; Hautapu

Service
- Operator(s): KiwiRail

History
- Opened: 6 October 1884
- Closed to Passengers: 9 September 1946
- Closed beyond Hautapu: 2 February 1999

Technical
- Line length: 19.27 km (11.97 mi) Ruakura – Cambridge; 15.08 km (9.37 mi) Ruakura – Hautapu
- Number of tracks: Single
- Character: Rural
- Track gauge: 1,067 mm (3 ft 6 in)

Map

The Cambridge Branch (officially named the Hautapu Branch since 2011) is a rural railway line in the Waikato, New Zealand. The line stretches from Ruakura Junction for 15.08 kilometres (9.37 mi) to the settlement of Hautapu, having previously continued another 4.19 kilometres (2.60 mi) to the township of Cambridge. It had five stations along its length, at Newstead, Matangi (Tamahere), Bruntwood (Fencourt), Hautapu and the terminus at Cambridge.

Passenger service on the line ceased on 9 September 1946, although during the 1950 British Empire Games at Auckland three passenger trains took 1,500 people to the rowing events held on the nearby Lake Karapiro on 7 February. There were occasional excursions, such as those celebrating the centennial in 1984. In 1999, the line was truncated to the dairy factory at Hautapu. In 2020 reopening of the branch to passengers was put forward as part of a scheme to help the area recover from the economic impacts of the COVID-19 pandemic. The cost was estimated at up to $150m, including relaying tracks to Cambridge.

== History ==
In the late 1870s the need for a railway line to the flourishing town of Cambridge had been noted and a Cambridge Railway Committee formed, after the Government had rejected 'Breakell's Line', an earlier name for the Cambridge Branch, which had been surveyed in 1879. The committee had a 22.13 km (13.75 mi) line from Rukuhia surveyed in 1880, which would have bridged the Waikato at the Narrows. Preliminary surveying for the current branch was conducted in 1881.

The line starts at Ruakura Junction on the East Coast Main Trunk, where the first sod was turned in the line's construction on 6 May 1882.

A kilometre (0.6 mi) south of the Newstead Station a five span timber bridge was needed to cross the Mangaonua Stream, and a contract to lay the permanent way over the full distance was let on 21 February 1884 at the price of £5,455.

On the morning of 1 October 1884 the line was inspected and passed ready for traffic. On 6 October a special train brought the new station master and his family along with other members of the staff to Cambridge and two days later the line was open for traffic.

== Cambridge railway yard ==
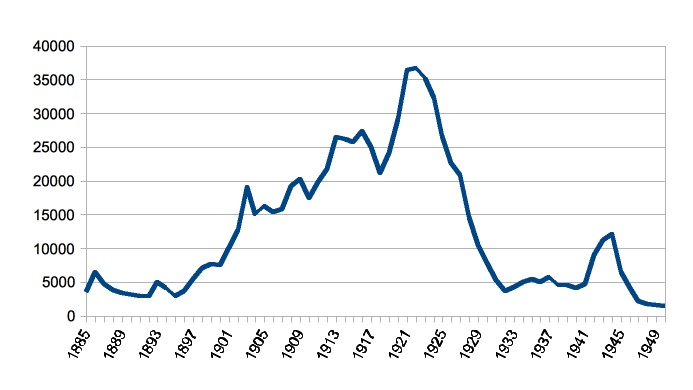
Chart of Cambridge railway station tickets sales 1885–1950

The Cambridge railway yard was located on a tract of land between Queen Street and Lake Te Ko-utu (from which water for the station was pumped) and crossed at its entrance by Lake Street.

Railway infrastructure originally included a Class 3 station, or a special station building (a 7 March 1884 contract was let to J.J. O'Brien to build it for £5,455.15s), stationmaster's house, urinals, goods shed (18 m (60 ft) x 9.1 m (30 ft), with a loading bank, from 1920 a verandah over the cart doors and in 1924 a 9.1 m (30 ft) extension and a small office for a clerk) and, from 1914, a crane, a locomotive shed and stockyards (extended and improved in 1891, 1914, 1928, 1945, 1955 and 1959). The rail yard consisted of main line, crossing loop, four sidings, goods shed siding, backshunt, turntable and locomotive depot, stockyard and private sidings. In 1899 a drop pit was added in the engine shed, to assist with bogie springs on the newer engines, and a 50 feet (15 m) turntable was moved from Ellerslie to Cambridge. The locomotive depot closed on 9 December 1929 and in 1930 the shed was moved to Frankton Junction as a store. Plans were made to remove the turntable in 1964, but it remained and was occasionally used until the early 1970s when it was dismantled and filled in. In 1972 the goods yard was sealed.

Cambridge yard was protected by both 'Home' and 'Distant' semaphore signals controlled via levers located at the station building. Four NZR built railway staff houses were also located on Queen Street bordering the railyards.

During the 1940s construction of the Karapiro Dam and Hydro scheme (9 kilometres [5.6 mi] east of Cambridge) necessitated the construction of a new siding and Public Works building in the yard site. Heavy materials, machinery, steel and cement used in the construction of the dam were railed direct to Cambridge and then transported further by truck to Karapiro. This new siding left the Main just within the Home Signal boundary and passed along the outer limits parallel to the yard to the large Public Works warehouse.

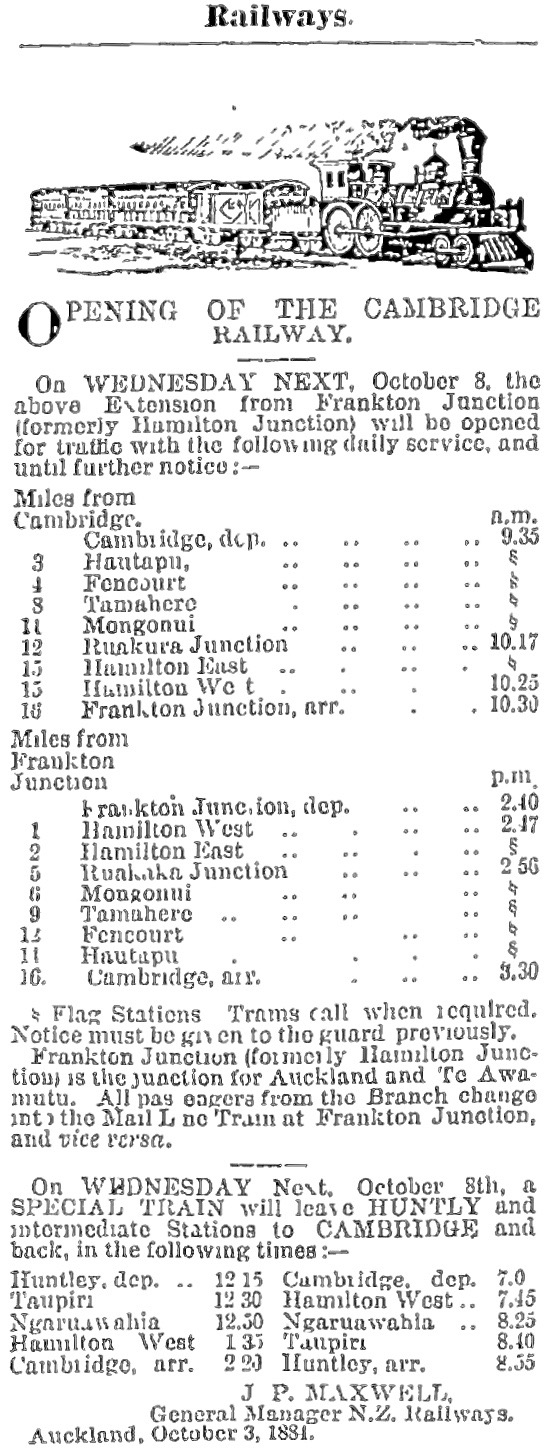
Cambridge Branch railway opening timetable 8 October 1884

Various private sidings were also used for the carriage of sawn timber, wood and wool products by local industries.In 1937 a 18 m (60 ft) loading bank for horses to and from Cambridge Racing Club was built, northeast of Taylor Street.

The station yard employed a mixture of 'Wynn-Williams' spring-loaded points, lockable switch points, ground-throw turnouts and also had trap-points/de-railers located on and protecting both the Public Works Siding, Crossing Loop and Number One Siding.

The old station building was sold and broken up in 1973 and an overhead crane was erected in its place to handle container traffic from Weddell Crown Aotearoa freezing works in Leamington. With the removal of the station building administration was subsequently moved and conducted from an office added to the Goods Shed. As a result, both the 'Home' and 'Distant' signals were fixed in the stop position. In the late 1970s following the removal of the stockyards the stockyard site was used for the washing and drying of N.Z.R tarpaulins on purpose built drying racks.

As shown in the table and graph, passenger traffic peaked in 1922, after a more frequent bus started running in 1920 –

year	tickets	season tickets	staff	source	title
1885	3,514		4	https://paperspast.natlib.govt.nz/parliamentary/appendix-to-the-journals-of-the-house-of-representatives/1885/I/1156	RETURN No. 10. STATEMENT of Revenue and Expenditure of each Station for the Twelve Months ending 31 March 1885
1886	6,461		4	https://paperspast.natlib.govt.nz/parliamentary/appendix-to-the-journals-of-the-house-of-representatives/1886/I/1138	RETURN No. 10. STATEMENT of Revenue and Expenditure of each Station for the Twelve Months ending 31 March 1886
1887	4,655		3	https://paperspast.natlib.govt.nz/parliamentary/appendix-to-the-journals-of-the-house-of-representatives/1887/I/920	RETURN No. 10. STATEMENT of Revenue and Expenditure of each Station for the Twelve Months ending 31 March 1887
1888	3,762		3	https://paperspast.natlib.govt.nz/parliamentary/appendix-to-the-journals-of-the-house-of-representatives/1889/I/1068?large_image=true	RETURN No. 10. STATEMENT of Revenue and Expenditure of each Station for the Twelve Months ending 31 March 1888
1889	3,388		3	https://paperspast.natlib.govt.nz/parliamentary/appendix-to-the-journals-of-the-house-of-representatives/1889/I/1068	RETURN No. 10. STATEMENT of Revenue and Expenditure of each Station for the Twelve Months ending 31 March 1889
1890				https://paperspast.natlib.govt.nz/parliamentary/appendix-to-the-journals-of-the-house-of-representatives/1890/I/1064	RETURN No. 10. STATEMENT of Revenue and Expenditure of each Station for the Twelve Months ending 31 March 1890
1891	2,901		3	https://paperspast.natlib.govt.nz/parliamentary/appendix-to-the-journals-of-the-house-of-representatives/1891/II/1264	RETURN No. 10. STATEMENT of Revenue and Expenditure of each Station for the Twelve Months ending 31 March 1891
1892	2,970		3	https://paperspast.natlib.govt.nz/parliamentary/appendix-to-the-journals-of-the-house-of-representatives/1892/I/1164	RETURN No. 10. STATEMENT of Revenue and Expenditure of each Station for the Twelve Months ending 31 March 1892
1893	5,025		3	https://paperspast.natlib.govt.nz/parliamentary/appendix-to-the-journals-of-the-house-of-representatives/1893/I/1494	RETURN No. 10. STATEMENT of Revenue and Expenditure of each Station for the Twelve Months ending 31 March 1893
1894	4,113	2	3	https://paperspast.natlib.govt.nz/parliamentary/appendix-to-the-journals-of-the-house-of-representatives/1894/I/1388	RETURN No. 10. STATEMENT of Revenue and Expenditure of each Station for the Twelve Months ending 31 March 1894
1895	2,912	15	3	https://paperspast.natlib.govt.nz/parliamentary/appendix-to-the-journals-of-the-house-of-representatives/1895/I/1586	RETURN No. 10. STATEMENT of Revenue and Expenditure of each Station for the Twelve Months ending 31 March 1895
1896	3,630	29	3	https://paperspast.natlib.govt.nz/parliamentary/appendix-to-the-journals-of-the-house-of-representatives/1896/I/1624	RETURN No. 10. STATEMENT of Revenue and Expenditure of each Station for the Twelve Months ending 31 March 1896
1897	5,497	38	3	https://paperspast.natlib.govt.nz/parliamentary/appendix-to-the-journals-of-the-house-of-representatives/1897/II/1610	RETURN No. 12. STATEMENT of Revenue and Expenditure of each Station for the Year ended 31 March 1897
1898	7,039	51	3	https://paperspast.natlib.govt.nz/parliamentary/appendix-to-the-journals-of-the-house-of-representatives/1898/I/1670	RETURN No. 12. STATEMENT of Revenue and Expenditure of each Station for the Year ended 31 March 1898
1899	7,619	63	3	https://paperspast.natlib.govt.nz/parliamentary/appendix-to-the-journals-of-the-house-of-representatives/1899/I/1824	RETURN No. 12. STATEMENT of Revenue and Expenditure of each Station for the Year ended 31 March 1899
1900	7,540	77	3	https://paperspast.natlib.govt.nz/parliamentary/appendix-to-the-journals-of-the-house-of-representatives/1900/I/1612	RETURN No. 12. STATEMENT of Revenue and Expenditure of each Station for the Year ended 31 March 1900
1901					RETURN No. 12. STATEMENT of Revenue and Expenditure of each Station for the Year ended 31 March 1901
1902	12,737	126	5	https://paperspast.natlib.govt.nz/parliamentary/appendix-to-the-journals-of-the-house-of-representatives/1902/I/1436	RETURN No. 12. STATEMENT of Revenue and Expenditure of each Station for the Year ended 31 March 1902
1903	18,988	139	5	https://paperspast.natlib.govt.nz/parliamentary/appendix-to-the-journals-of-the-house-of-representatives/1903/I/1873	RETURN No. 12. STATEMENT of Revenue and Expenditure of each Station for the Year ended 31 March 1903
1904	15,107	160	5	https://paperspast.natlib.govt.nz/parliamentary/appendix-to-the-journals-of-the-house-of-representatives/1904/I/1848	RETURN No. 12. STATEMENT of Revenue and Expenditure of each Station for the Year ended 31 March 1904
1905	16,171	63	5	https://paperspast.natlib.govt.nz/parliamentary/appendix-to-the-journals-of-the-house-of-representatives/1905/I/3767	RETURN No. 12. STATEMENT of Revenue and Expenditure of each Station for the Year ended 31 March 1905
1906	15,415		5	https://paperspast.natlib.govt.nz/parliamentary/appendix-to-the-journals-of-the-house-of-representatives/1906/II/1600	RETURN No. 12. STATEMENT of Revenue and Expenditure of each Station for the Year ended 31 March 1906
1907	15,776		5	https://paperspast.natlib.govt.nz/parliamentary/appendix-to-the-journals-of-the-house-of-representatives/1907/I/2542	RETURN No. 12. STATEMENT of Revenue and Expenditure of each Station for the Year ended 31 March 1907
1908	19,265		6	https://paperspast.natlib.govt.nz/parliamentary/appendix-to-the-journals-of-the-house-of-representatives/1908/I/2061	RETURN No. 12. STATEMENT of Revenue and Expenditure of each Station for the Year ended 31 March 1908
1909	20,234	2	7	https://paperspast.natlib.govt.nz/parliamentary/appendix-to-the-journals-of-the-house-of-representatives/1909/II/1832	RETURN No. 12. STATEMENT of Revenue and Expenditure of each Station for the Year ended 31 March 1909
1910	17,450	5	7	https://paperspast.natlib.govt.nz/parliamentary/appendix-to-the-journals-of-the-house-of-representatives/1910/I/2050	RETURN No. 12. STATEMENT of Revenue and Expenditure of each Station for the Year ended 31 March 1910
1911	19,864	3	7	https://paperspast.natlib.govt.nz/parliamentary/appendix-to-the-journals-of-the-house-of-representatives/1911/I/2497	RETURN No. 12. STATEMENT of Revenue and Expenditure of each Station for the Year ended 31 March 1911
1912	21,676	3	8	https://paperspast.natlib.govt.nz/parliamentary/appendix-to-the-journals-of-the-house-of-representatives/1912/II/2420	RETURN No. 12. STATEMENT of Revenue and Expenditure of each Station for the Year ended 31 March 1912
1913	26,454	13	7	https://paperspast.natlib.govt.nz/parliamentary/appendix-to-the-journals-of-the-house-of-representatives/1913/I/3693	RETURN No. 12. STATEMENT of Revenue and Expenditure of each Station for the Year ended 31 March 1913
1914	26,088	35		https://paperspast.natlib.govt.nz/parliamentary/appendix-to-the-journals-of-the-house-of-representatives/1914/I/2031	RETURN No. 12. Statement of Revenue for each Station for the Year ended 31 March 1914
1915	25,781	76		https://paperspast.natlib.govt.nz/parliamentary/appendix-to-the-journals-of-the-house-of-representatives/1915/I/1638	RETURN No. 12. Statement of Revenue for each Station for the Year ended 31 March 1915
1916	27,288	76		https://paperspast.natlib.govt.nz/parliamentary/appendix-to-the-journals-of-the-house-of-representatives/1916/I/1053	RETURN No. 12. Statement of Revenue for each Station for the Year ended 31 March 1916
1917	25,018	109		https://paperspast.natlib.govt.nz/parliamentary/appendix-to-the-journals-of-the-house-of-representatives/1917/I/1123	RETURN No. 12. Statement of Revenue for each Station for the Year ended 31 March 1917
1918	21,160	64		https://paperspast.natlib.govt.nz/parliamentary/appendix-to-the-journals-of-the-house-of-representatives/1918/I-II/1159	RETURN No. 12. Statement of Revenue for each Station for the Year ended 31 March 1918
1919	24,079	60		https://paperspast.natlib.govt.nz/parliamentary/appendix-to-the-journals-of-the-house-of-representatives/1919/I/1231	RETURN No. 12. Statement of Revenue for each Station for the Year ended 31 March 1919
1920	29,124	73		https://paperspast.natlib.govt.nz/parliamentary/appendix-to-the-journals-of-the-house-of-representatives/1920/I/1349	RETURN No. 12. Statement of Revenue for each Station for the Year ended 31 March 1920
1921	36,362	141		https://paperspast.natlib.govt.nz/parliamentary/appendix-to-the-journals-of-the-house-of-representatives/1921/I-II/1452	RETURN No. 12. Statement of Revenue for each Station for the Year ended 31 March 1921
1922	36,698	159		https://paperspast.natlib.govt.nz/parliamentary/appendix-to-the-journals-of-the-house-of-representatives/1922/I/1409	RETURN No. 12. Statement of Revenue for each Station for the Year ended 31 March 1922
1923	35,232	225		https://paperspast.natlib.govt.nz/parliamentary/appendix-to-the-journals-of-the-house-of-representatives/1923/I-II/1321	RETURN No. 12. Statement of Revenue for each Station for the Year ended 31 March 1923
1924	32,256	142		https://paperspast.natlib.govt.nz/parliamentary/appendix-to-the-journals-of-the-house-of-representatives/1924/I/2458	RETURN No. 12. Statement of Revenue for each Station for the Year ended 31 March 1924
1925	26,555	149		https://paperspast.natlib.govt.nz/parliamentary/appendix-to-the-journals-of-the-house-of-representatives/1925/I/1804	RETURN No. 12. Statement of Traffic and Revenue for each Station for the Year ended 31 March 1925
1926	22,645	307		https://paperspast.natlib.govt.nz/parliamentary/appendix-to-the-journals-of-the-house-of-representatives/1926/I/1930	STATEMENT No. 18 Statement of Traffic and Revenue for each Station for the Year ended 31 March 1926
1927	20,855	253		https://paperspast.natlib.govt.nz/parliamentary/appendix-to-the-journals-of-the-house-of-representatives/1927/I/2230	STATEMENT No. 18 Statement of Traffic and Revenue for each Station for the Year ended 31 March 1927
1928	14,653	125		https://paperspast.natlib.govt.nz/parliamentary/appendix-to-the-journals-of-the-house-of-representatives/1928/I/2628	STATEMENT No. 18 Statement of Traffic and Revenue for each Station for the Year ended 31 March 1928
1929	10,400	110		https://paperspast.natlib.govt.nz/parliamentary/appendix-to-the-journals-of-the-house-of-representatives/1929/I/2090	STATEMENT No. 18 Statement of Traffic and Revenue for each Station for the Year ended 31 March 1929
1930	7,858	117		https://paperspast.natlib.govt.nz/parliamentary/appendix-to-the-journals-of-the-house-of-representatives/1930/I/2212	STATEMENT No. 18 Statement of Traffic and Revenue for each Station for the Year ended 31 March 1930
1931	5,239	110		https://paperspast.natlib.govt.nz/parliamentary/appendix-to-the-journals-of-the-house-of-representatives/1931/I-II/1778	STATEMENT No. 18 Statement of Traffic and Revenue for each Station for the Year ended 31 March 1931
1932	3,613	92		https://paperspast.natlib.govt.nz/parliamentary/appendix-to-the-journals-of-the-house-of-representatives/1932/I-II/1934	STATEMENT No. 18 Statement of Traffic and Revenue for each Station for the Year ended 31 March 1932
1933	4,218	118		https://paperspast.natlib.govt.nz/parliamentary/appendix-to-the-journals-of-the-house-of-representatives/1933/I/1388	STATEMENT No. 18 Statement of Traffic and Revenue for each Station for the Year ended 31 March 1933
1934	4,987	142		https://paperspast.natlib.govt.nz/parliamentary/appendix-to-the-journals-of-the-house-of-representatives/1934/I/2278	STATEMENT No. 18 Statement of Traffic and Revenue for each Station for the Year ended 31 March 1934
1935	5,502	156		https://paperspast.natlib.govt.nz/parliamentary/appendix-to-the-journals-of-the-house-of-representatives/1935/I/1326	STATEMENT No. 18 Statement of Traffic and Revenue for each Station for the Year ended 31 March 1935
1936	5,043	90		https://paperspast.natlib.govt.nz/parliamentary/appendix-to-the-journals-of-the-house-of-representatives/1936/I/1552	STATEMENT No. 18 Statement of Traffic and Revenue for each Station for the Year ended 31 March 1936
1937	5,770	94		https://paperspast.natlib.govt.nz/parliamentary/appendix-to-the-journals-of-the-house-of-representatives/1937/I/1896	STATEMENT No. 18 Statement of Traffic and Revenue for each Station for the Year ended 31 March 1937
1938	4,597	107		https://paperspast.natlib.govt.nz/parliamentary/appendix-to-the-journals-of-the-house-of-representatives/1938/I/1652	STATEMENT No. 18 Statement of Traffic and Revenue for each Station for the Year ended 31 March 1938
1939	4,571	84		https://paperspast.natlib.govt.nz/parliamentary/appendix-to-the-journals-of-the-house-of-representatives/1939/I/1970	STATEMENT No. 18 Statement of Traffic and Revenue for each Station for the Year ended 31 March 1939
1940	4,085	102		https://paperspast.natlib.govt.nz/parliamentary/appendix-to-the-journals-of-the-house-of-representatives/1940/I/1314	STATEMENT No. 18 Statement of Traffic and Revenue for each Station for the Year ended 31 March 1940
1941	4,720	92		https://paperspast.natlib.govt.nz/parliamentary/appendix-to-the-journals-of-the-house-of-representatives/1941/I/1203	STATEMENT No. 18 Statement of Traffic and Revenue for each Station for the Year ended 31 March 1941
1942	9,001	50		https://paperspast.natlib.govt.nz/parliamentary/appendix-to-the-journals-of-the-house-of-representatives/1942/I/651	STATEMENT No. 18 Statement of Traffic and Revenue for each Station for the Year ended 31 March 1942
1943	11,257	70		https://paperspast.natlib.govt.nz/parliamentary/appendix-to-the-journals-of-the-house-of-representatives/1943/I/679	STATEMENT No. 18 Statement of Traffic and Revenue for each Station for the Year ended 31 March 1943
1944	12,162	75		https://paperspast.natlib.govt.nz/parliamentary/appendix-to-the-journals-of-the-house-of-representatives/1944/I/895	STATEMENT No. 18 Statement of Traffic and Revenue for each Station for the Year ended 31 March 1944
1945	6,466	61		https://paperspast.natlib.govt.nz/parliamentary/appendix-to-the-journals-of-the-house-of-representatives/1945/I/969	STATEMENT No. 18 Statement of Traffic and Revenue for each Station for the Year ended 31 March 1945
1946	4,160	31		https://paperspast.natlib.govt.nz/parliamentary/appendix-to-the-journals-of-the-house-of-representatives/1946/I/1548	STATEMENT No. 18 Statement of Traffic and Revenue for each Station for the Year ended 31 March 1946
1947	2,124	6		https://paperspast.natlib.govt.nz/parliamentary/appendix-to-the-journals-of-the-house-of-representatives/1947/I/2495	STATEMENT No. 18 Statement of Traffic and Revenue for each Station for the Year ended 31 March 1947
1948	1,706			https://paperspast.natlib.govt.nz/parliamentary/appendix-to-the-journals-of-the-house-of-representatives/1948/I/2521	STATEMENT No. 18 Statement of Traffic and Revenue for each Station for the Year ended 31 March 1948
1949	1,519			https://paperspast.natlib.govt.nz/parliamentary/appendix-to-the-journals-of-the-house-of-representatives/1949/I/2104	STATEMENT No. 18 Statement of Traffic and Revenue for each Station for the Year ended 31 March 1949
1950	1,417			https://paperspast.natlib.govt.nz/parliamentary/appendix-to-the-journals-of-the-house-of-representatives/1950/I/2366	STATEMENT No. 18 Statement of Traffic and Revenue for each Station for the Year ended 31 March 1950

== Other stations ==
The following stations were located on the Cambridge Branchline with distances measured from Ruakura Junction.

=== Newstead (2.57 km [1.60 mi]) ===
Newstead (originally named Mongonui) was the first station located on the branch line after leaving the East Coast Main Trunk. It originally had a platform and shelter type station building, crossing loop and one siding. Owing to the demise of passenger traffic and increase in road cartage of goods the station was removed although the loop was used at times to store retired wagons even into the 1980s.

=== Matangi (7.47 km [4.64 mi]) ===
Tamahere (in 1906 renamed Matangi) was once an important station on the branchline with a large dairy factory requiring both inwards consignments of coal and also supplying outwards dairy freight. The station yard included a crossing loop, 3 sidings, Goods Shed siding and also a siding for the dairy factory.

=== Bruntwood (12.88 km [8.00 mi]) ===
Bruntwood (previously Fencourt) was the site of a dairy factory and had a siding curving off the branch mainline and into the factory site.

=== Hautapu (15.08 km [9.37 mi]) ===
Previously the last station before Cambridge and current terminus of the railway. Hautapu has had a dairy factory since the 1880s and has a long tradition with using rail for outbound freight movement. The railway line intersects through the middle of the factory grounds and it is this convenience that has ultimately insured the lines survival. In the late 1980s expansions to the dairy factory and the construction of a new bulk refrigerated storage facility required the branch 'Main' to be diverted and new rail sidings built. Hautapu railyard comprises the Main line, elongated loop, three sidings, backshunt and 'Cool Store' siding with rail access on either side of the building.

The Hautapu factory currently still generates enough traffic to justify regular services and two trains daily in peak dairy season.

== Operation ==
In the early days regular services on the Cambridge branch were mixed (passenger and freight), stopping where or when required. The exception was the midday train which carried passengers only. The service was increased to two trains a day in 1902. Connections were made at Frankton Junction with services on the North Island Main Trunk. There were dairy factories located at Matangi and Bruntwood (Fencourt) and Hautapu requiring inwards supplies and sending outwards goods. During the 1920s, motor vehicles started to take over the passenger traffic and the last time-tabled passenger train left Cambridge without ceremony on 9 September 1946.

At one stage a loading bank for the Cambridge Raceway was located on the branch Main, adjacent to the racetrack grounds near the Taylor Street level-crossing, for the loading and unloading of race horses on important race days. Freight traffic continued with common goods carried including wood, coal, wool, meat, cars, fertiliser and grain. In 1973 a gantry-type container crane was erected in the station yard for the truck to train transition of containerised refrigerated meat from the Weddell Crown freezing works in Leamington.

With the closure of the freezing works in 1993 the traffic originating from Cambridge declined with the only remaining customer being Summit Grains. Summit Grains occupied the former Public Works warehouse in the station yard and used rail for inbound shipments of bulk grain and horse feed until early 1999 when the section from Hautapu to Cambridge was officially closed and subsequently lifted and removed.

== Wartime traffic ==
The Cambridge Branch Line played a small part during World War Two for the transport of bulk aircraft fuel. In 1942 a top-secret fuel storage facility consisting of a bulk fuel tank, underground pipelines and tunnels codenamed 'AR-9' was built in the area directly adjacent and below the rail yards beside Lake Te Koutu. This RNZAF facility was designed to stockpile aircraft fuel for use by the air force at Rukuhia south of Hamilton. With the very real threat of Japanese invasion, it was constructed in secrecy with tank trains reportedly unloading fuel at night.

== Motive power ==
Like all New Zealand branch lines in the 1880s the Cambridge Line was first serviced by small tank engines. Due to axle-load and weight restrictions imposed by both rail weight and the Mangaonua Stream bridge, mainline locomotives have always been forbidden to operate on the line.

By the 1940s the B and Bb Class engines were prevalent and by the 1950s the A^{B} class 4-6-2 was the main loco employed on Cambridge Branch trains. With the dieselization of the New Zealand Railways network in the late 1950s and 1960s a mix of steam and diesel motive power became common. The last steam engine to run on the line was A^{B} 733 on Monday 26 June 1967, and in 1990 the line averaged about four shunts per day.

In the 1970s the main locomotives working the Cambridge Branch were diesels of the classes D^{I}, D^{B} and D^{SC}. By the 1980s and through the 1990s until the Hautapu-Cambridge sections closure, the majority of trains were pulled by DBR class engines. At various times a small shunting engine of the class TR was used to perform various shunting duties and was housed in the Goods Shed at Cambridge. All trains that currently use the line to Hautapu are DBR or DC hauled.

== Today ==
In the following months after the closure of the Hautapu-Cambridge section of line in 1999 all the yard and line tracks were quickly lifted and Goods Shed dismantled. The Samson Post was moved to the new terminus of the line at Hautapu. The 'Home' semaphore signal remained in position until being moved to the grounds of the Cambridge Museum where it is currently on display along with the '18 km' and '19 km' distance markers. The 'Cambridge' sign marking the entrance to the yard and also the 'Kissing Gates' of 1884 vintage remain preserved in place. The line formation is still very evident as a vacant plot of land stretching in a straight line to Hautapu for 4 kilometres (2.5 mi) between Victoria Road East and Victoria Road West and tree-lined within the town boundary. In 2010 KiwiRail required that the railway designation remain in place to protect the potential for the line to carry freight and passengers in future.

All evidence of the railway yard has been erased with exception of a loading bank, the stockyard platform and the remains of the locomotive inspection pit on the site of the old loco depot.

In early 2015 the old 3-hectare (7.4-acre) yard was put up for tender after the last business Summit Grains moved from the former public works warehouse site, In early 2016 details were released by Hamilton-based Trig Group of a multi-million dollar development called Lakewood Cambridge, with the construction of at least half a dozen building starting in June 2017. The development makes way for new housing and shops in the two story buildings with the rest of the space being turned into a large carpark with no unique tips to the sites rail history.

On the 16th of August 2017 construction of a new roundabout and the relocation of the kissing gates were completed in relation to completion of the Waikato Expressway Cambridge bypass and Lakewood Cambridge development of the Cambridge railway yard.

VTNZ is still in 2017 operating in the grounds of the old rail yard.

In 2020 double tracking and potentially reopening the Cambridge station for events, were put forward as part of a scheme to help the area recover from the economic impacts of the COVID-19 pandemic. The proposal was in turn part of a $150m scheme to relay tracks to Cambridge.

== Official name ==
From its first opening the line was generally referred to using variations of the 'Cambridge Railway' or 'Cambridge Branch', and in 1977 the name 'Cambridge Branch Railway' was reconfirmed as the official name in The New Zealand Gazette. In 1996 the line officially became the 'Cambridge Industrial Siding' (sometimes erroneously referred to as the 'Cambridge Industrial Line') before becoming the 'Hautapu Branch' in 2011. It has also been called the 'Cambridge / Hautapu Industrial Siding'.

The former section from Hautapu to Cambridge is still officially gazetted as being the 'Cambridge Industrial Siding', though the official record does note that the tracks have been removed.

== See also ==
- East Coast Main Trunk
- Glen Afton Branch
- Glen Massey Line
- Kimihia Branch
- Kinleith Branch
- Rotorua Branch
- Thames Branch
