= Hillcrest High School, Hamilton =

New Zealand coeducational high school

Hillcrest High School
- Te Kura Tuarua O Tihipuke

Location
- 132 Masters Avenue; Silverdale; Hamilton 3216; New Zealand; 37°47′34″S 175°19′34″E

Information
- Funding type: State
- Motto: Latin: Circumspice (Look Around You)
- Established: 1972
- Ministry of Education Institution no.: 138
- Chairperson: Andrew Don
- Principal: Christine Williams
- Years offered: 9–13
- Gender: Coeducational
- Enrolment: 1,818
- Socio-economic decile: 7
- Website: hillcrest-high.school.nz

Hillcrest High School is a state coeducational secondary school located in south-eastern Hamilton, New Zealand. The school is named after the suburb of Hillcrest for which it serves, although the school itself is located in Silverdale. Opened in 1972, the school has a roll of 1,818 students as of July 2026. making it the second-largest school in Hamilton.

== History ==
Hillcrest High School is the second youngest school out of the state and state-integrated secondary schools in Hamilton (the youngest before the opening of Rototuna Junior and Senior High Schools), opening for instruction for the first time in January 1972. Like many New Zealand state secondary schools built in the 1970s, Hillcrest was built to the S68 standard design. The school has three full-sized S68 blocks (B, C, and D blocks) and one half-sized S68 block (western half of E block – the eastern half is a later addition).

== Enrolment ==
At the April 2013 Education Review Office (ERO) review of the school, Hillcrest High School had 1630 students, including 35 international students. The school roll's gender composition was 47% male and 53% female, and its ethnic composition was 52% European New Zealanders (Pākehā), 20.5% Asian, 14% Māori, 7% other European, and 4% Pasifika.

As of July 2026, Hillcrest High School has a roll of 1,818 students, of which 280 (15.4%) identify as Māori.

As of 2026, the school has an Equity Index of 451, placing it amongst schools whose students have average socioeconomic barriers to achievement (roughly equivalent to deciles 5 and 6 under the former socio-economic decile system).

== Curriculum ==
The school examines students using the New Zealand standard, National Certificate of Educational Achievement (NCEA). Cambridge examinations for Mathematics and English are also available for able Year 12 students. A wide variety of subjects can be taken at Hillcrest High, ranging from Visual Art to Mechanics, international languages as well as standard subjects such as English, Mathematics and Science.

Hillcrest students received a total of 54 scholarships, the sixth highest number of scholarships of any high school in the North Island. Seven Hillcrest students received Top Scholar Awards from the New Zealand Qualifications Authority between 2002 and 2005. A student in 2008 scored 99% in the Cambridge English exam, achieving the highest score in the world.

== Motto ==
There are two commonplace Latin pronunciations: in Ecclesiastical Latin the school motto 'Circumspice' is pronounced chir-koom-spee-cheh, in Classical Latin it is pronounced as keer-koom-speek-eh. It means 'look around you'.

== Notable alumni ==
- James Baker, first-class cricketer
- Greg Foran, businessman
- Kimbra Johnson, musician based in Melbourne, Australia. Graduated from this school in 2007
- Laura Langman, plays for the Silver Ferns, the New Zealand international Netball team. Graduated from this school in 2003.
- Jesse Mulligan, TV presenter. Graduated from this school in 1992.
- Anjali Mulari, ice and inline hockey player. Graduated from this school in 2010.
- Laura Tupou, news reader and television presenter
- Phum Viphurit, musician. Graduated in 2013
- Sonia Waddell, graduated from this school in 1991. Represented New Zealand in rowing at the 2000 and 2004 Summer Olympics
