= Ruakura =

Suburb of Hamilton, New Zealand

- Suburb
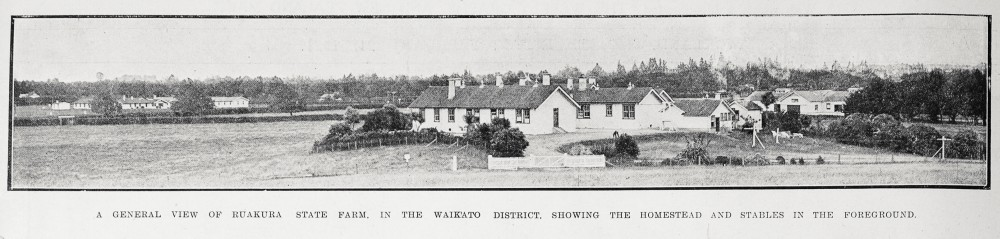
- Ruakura State Farm in 1921 (homestead and stables in foreground)
- Interactive map of Ruakura
- Coordinates: 37°46′28.74″S 175°18′37.07″E
- Country: New Zealand
- City: Hamilton, New Zealand
- Local authority: Hamilton City Council
- Electoral ward: East Ward
- Established: 1888

Area
  - Land: 902 ha (2,230 acres)

Population (June 2025)
  - Total: 3,370
  - Density: 374/km^{2} (968/sq mi)

Enderley	Fairview Downs	Eureka
Claudelands	Ruakura	Newstead
Hamilton East	Hillcrest	Silverdale

Ruakura is a semi-rural suburb of Hamilton City, in the Waikato region of New Zealand. The University of Waikato is nearby.

The area lies to the east of urban Hamilton and to the west of State Highway 1.

== Ruakura Agriculture Research Centre ==
Waikato Agricultural College and Model Farm was set up in 1888, so that Ruakura is now synonymous with the Ruakura Agriculture Research Centre, the location of institutes such as AgResearch and Plant & Food Research. Areas of AgResearch's research at Ruakura include animal molecular biology (genomics and cloning), reproductive technologies, agricultural systems modelling, land management, dairy science, meat science, food processing technology and safety, and animal behaviour and welfare. Plant & Food Research's site in Hamilton is home to its blueberry nursery, its Bioengineering Group and its Food and Biological Chemistry laboratory. Work is also carried out on biological control agents and plant nutrient solutions (Ruakura solution). The Waikato region is a major contributor to New Zealand's agricultural-based economy, and Ruakura has an important role in that industry.

The Ruakura Agriculture Research Centre is on land owned by the Waikato Tainui, to whom it was returned by the Crown as part of their 1995 Waikato Raupatu Land Settlement.

The Waikato Regional Council included a majority of the land at Ruakura in the proposed Regional Policy Statement (PWRPS) as a future employment area. The Hamilton City Council Proposed District Plan gave effect to the PWRPS incorporating the Ruakura structure plan. The long-term plan for Ruakura is that it will be New Zealand's largest integrated commercial and lifestyle development anchored by a freight and logistics hub.

== Demographics ==
Ruakura covers 9.02 km^{2} (3.48 sq mi) and had an estimated population of 3,370 as of June 2025, with a population density of 374 people per km^{2}.

Historical population
Year	Pop.	±% p.a.
2006	831	—
2013	900	+1.15%
2018	1,158	+5.17%
2023	2,784	+19.18%

Ruakura had a population of 2,784 in the 2023 New Zealand census, an increase of 1,626 people (140.4%) since the 2018 census, and an increase of 1,884 people (209.3%) since the 2013 census. There were 1,362 males, 1,407 females and 15 people of other genders in 732 dwellings. 6.1% of people identified as LGBTIQ+. The median age was 27.5 years (compared with 38.1 years nationally). There were 435 people (15.6%) aged under 15 years, 1,080 (38.8%) aged 15 to 29, 1,101 (39.5%) aged 30 to 64, and 168 (6.0%) aged 65 or older.

People could identify as more than one ethnicity. The results were 48.1% European (Pākehā); 13.5% Māori; 3.9% Pasifika; 42.7% Asian; 3.0% Middle Eastern, Latin American and African New Zealanders (MELAA); and 1.9% other, which includes people giving their ethnicity as "New Zealander". English was spoken by 92.0%, Māori language by 3.4%, Samoan by 0.9%, and other languages by 33.1%. No language could be spoken by 2.7% (e.g. too young to talk). New Zealand Sign Language was known by 0.3%. The percentage of people born overseas was 45.3, compared with 28.8% nationally.

Religious affiliations were 26.7% Christian, 9.3% Hindu, 3.6% Islam, 0.9% Māori religious beliefs, 2.5% Buddhist, 0.2% New Age, and 5.6% other religions. People who answered that they had no religion were 46.0%, and 5.3% of people did not answer the census question.

Of those at least 15 years old, 822 (35.0%) people had a bachelor's or higher degree, 1,104 (47.0%) had a post-high school certificate or diploma, and 420 (17.9%) people exclusively held high school qualifications. The median income was $38,200, compared with $41,500 nationally. 240 people (10.2%) earned over $100,000 compared to 12.1% nationally. The employment status of those at least 15 was that 1,164 (49.6%) people were employed full-time, 309 (13.2%) were part-time, and 102 (4.3%) were unemployed.

In the 2018 census a new Ruakura area was created, covering the University and a rural area on the city fringe. It is 9.02 km^{2} (3.48 sq mi). Up to 2013 Ruakura was part of the 8.22 km^{2} (3.17 sq mi) Newstead area, which covered a similar area, but excluded the university. As shown below, the change resulted in a much larger, younger and poorer population in 2018 than previously and younger than the 37.4 years of the national average. 61.1% were European, 27.2% Asian and 13.7% Māori. Only 3 people lived in meshblock 0955300, at the Research Centre, in 2013.

	Population				Median income	
Year	Ruakura	Newstead	Median age	Households	Local	NZ
2001		159	30.5	51	$24,200	$18,500
2006	831	174	41.5	57	$32,500	$24,100
2013	900	216	36.2	81	$33,800	$27,900
2018	1,158		20.6	189	$10,400	$31,800
2023	2,784		27.5	732	$38,200	$41,500

Individual statistical areas
Name	Area (km^{2})	Population	Density (per km^{2})	Dwellings	Median age	Median income
Greenhill Park	2.04	1,698	832	591	32.1 years	$57,500
Ruakura	6.98	1,086	156	141	20.3 years	$13,200
New Zealand					38.1 years	$41,500

== Education ==
Tai Wananga is a co-educational state secondary school located in Ruakura. It had a roll of 169.

Te Kura Kaupapa Māori o Toku Mapihi Maurea is a coeducational full primary school (years 1–8) with a roll of 91. The school teaches primarily in the Māori language.

Both schools are coeducational. Rolls are as of March 2026.

== Ruakura Junction railway station ==
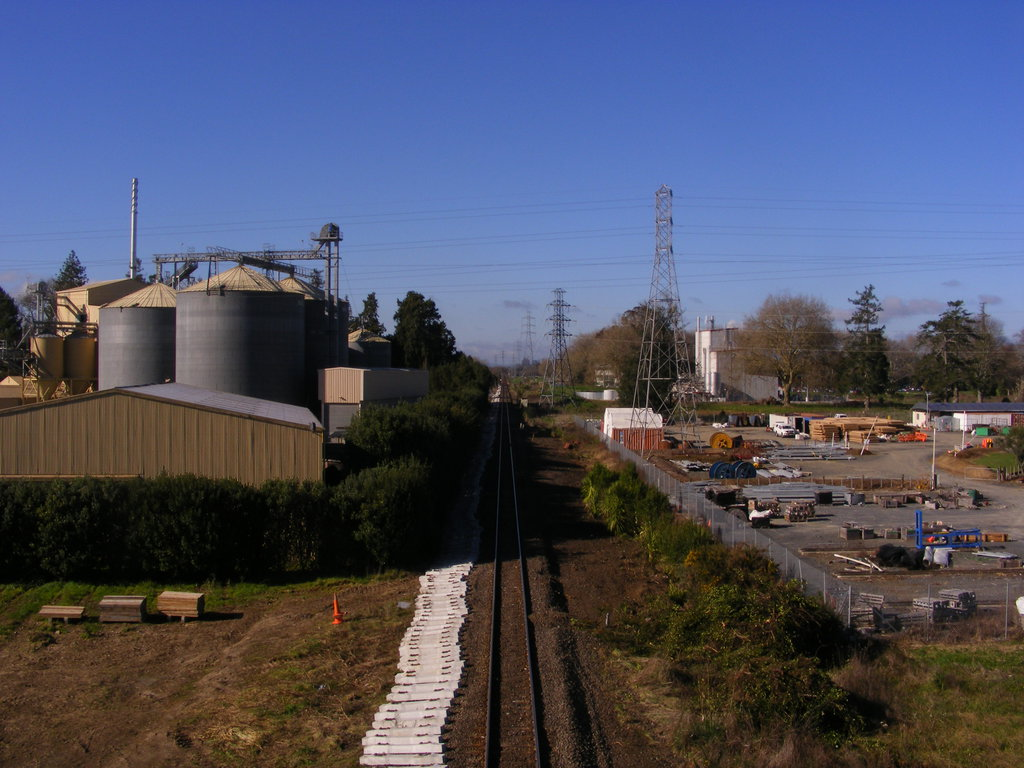
Railway at Ruakura

Ruakura had a railway station from 1 October 1884 to 1 January 1967 at the junction of the East Coast Main Trunk and the Cambridge Branch. The branch had its first public train on 8 October 1884. Ruakura was 8.17 km (5.08 mi) west of Eureka and 3.94 km (2.45 mi) east of Claudelands. it was 2.57 km (1.60 mi) north of Mongaonui (or Mongonui), later renamed Newstead. When the line opened, Ruakura station was described as an island in a swamp, with no road connection. In 2020 reopening as a "passenger rail Metro Station" was put forward as part of a $150m scheme to relay tracks to Cambridge and help the area recover from the economic impacts of the COVID-19 pandemic.

	Former adjoining stations	
Claudelands; Line open, station closed 3.94 km (2.45 mi)	East Coast Main Trunk; New Zealand Railways Department	Eureka; Line open, station closed
Terminus	Cambridge Branch	Newstead; Line open, station closed

== Employment area ==
In 2016, approval was given to create an employment area, with an inland port, served by the railway and the Hamilton Bypass. The development will cover 485 ha (1,200 acres), including a 31 ha (77 acres) inland port to the west of the Research Centre. Opening was planned in 2021. In 2021, further developments for Ruakura have been planned to expand it as a residential and logistics suburb, in addition to integrating Ruakura Road into the Waikato Expressway and improving business between regions outside of Waikato. Businesses in the area include a Kmart Distribution Centre and cold storage depots.

In July 2022, the New Zealand division of Kmart announced plans to shift their Auckland distribution centre to Hamilton, with permission of the Waikato-Tainui iwi. It has since opened in September 2023, becoming the new North Island distribution centre for Kmart.

=== Inland port ===
The 9 ha (22 acres), $60m, Ruakura Inland Port, joint venture of Tainui Group Holdings and Port of Tauranga, had its first trains from Tauranga and Auckland on 3 August 2023. It has two 800 m (2,600 ft) sidings (about 90 containers per train), served by 2 trains a week.

=== Residential areas ===
The 2016 Structure Plan included residential development to the north and south of the employment areas.

==== Greenhill Park ====
Greenhill Park is a medium density suburb at the north west of the development, begun in 2016, It adjoins Fairview Downs. A 110kV transmission line was undergrounded in 2020 to make way for more housing.

== See also ==
- List of streets in Hamilton
