= River Road, Hamilton =

Suburb of Hamilton, New Zealand

River Road
- Suburb
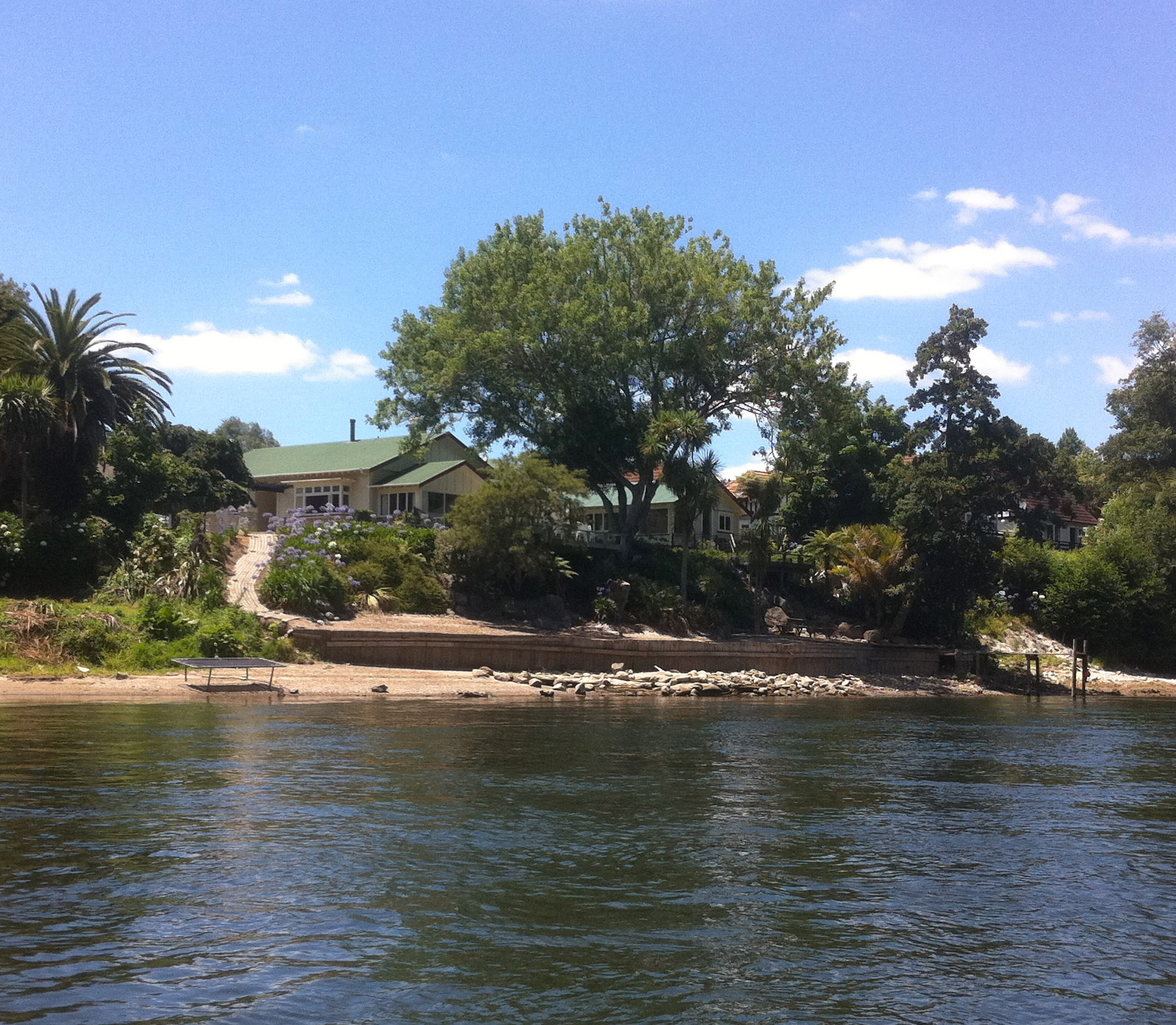
- Houses on the bank of the Waikato River
- Interactive map of River Road
- Coordinates: 37.771°S 175.271°E
- Country: New Zealand
- City: Hamilton, New Zealand
- Local authority: Hamilton City Council
- Electoral ward: East Ward

Area
  - Land: 208 ha (510 acres)

Population (June 2025)
  - Total: 3,500
  - Density: 1,700/km^{2} (4,400/sq mi)

St Andrews	Queenwood	Chartwell
Beerescourt	River Road	Fairfield
Whitiora	Hamilton North	Claudelands

River Road is a residential suburb of Hamilton, sited on the eastern bank of the Waikato River. The namesake road runs from Claudelands Bridge north to Pukete Bridge and beyond, to Ngāruawāhia, but the main part of the suburb is between Boundary Road and Donny Park. Properties close to the river are much more expensive than those further away. Most of River Road was shown on an 1865 map, though it was some years later before it was built and, by 1866, only one bridge had been built.

A walking path runs along the river bank, but it does not cover the entire length of the area.

== Demographics ==
Miropiko statistical area, which corresponds to River Road, covers 2.08 km^{2} (0.80 sq mi) and had an estimated population of 3,500 as of June 2025, with a population density of 1,683 people per km^{2}. Statistics for Miropiko are also included in Fairfield.

Historical population
Year	Pop.	±% p.a.
2006	2,991	—
2013	3,177	+0.87%
2018	3,186	+0.06%
2023	3,306	+0.74%

Miropiko had a population of 3,306 in the 2023 New Zealand census, an increase of 120 people (3.8%) since the 2018 census, and an increase of 129 people (4.1%) since the 2013 census. There were 1,551 males, 1,731 females and 24 people of other genders in 1,218 dwellings. 3.7% of people identified as LGBTIQ+. The median age was 37.9 years (compared with 38.1 years nationally). There were 639 people (19.3%) aged under 15 years, 660 (20.0%) aged 15 to 29, 1,476 (44.6%) aged 30 to 64, and 534 (16.2%) aged 65 or older.

People could identify as more than one ethnicity. The results were 77.9% European (Pākehā); 19.1% Māori; 5.0% Pasifika; 10.1% Asian; 2.2% Middle Eastern, Latin American and African New Zealanders (MELAA); and 2.4% other, which includes people giving their ethnicity as "New Zealander". English was spoken by 95.1%, Māori language by 4.9%, Samoan by 0.9%, and other languages by 13.1%. No language could be spoken by 2.6% (e.g. too young to talk). New Zealand Sign Language was known by 0.5%. The percentage of people born overseas was 22.5, compared with 28.8% nationally.

Religious affiliations were 36.7% Christian, 1.4% Hindu, 1.8% Islam, 0.8% Māori religious beliefs, 0.6% Buddhist, 0.4% New Age, 0.1% Jewish, and 2.4% other religions. People who answered that they had no religion were 50.4%, and 5.8% of people did not answer the census question.

Of those at least 15 years old, 978 (36.7%) people had a bachelor's or higher degree, 1,248 (46.8%) had a post-high school certificate or diploma, and 438 (16.4%) people exclusively held high school qualifications. The median income was $52,300, compared with $41,500 nationally. 510 people (19.1%) earned over $100,000 compared to 12.1% nationally. The employment status of those at least 15 was that 1,434 (53.8%) people were employed full-time, 405 (15.2%) were part-time, and 48 (1.8%) were unemployed.

Although the statistical area is called Miropiko, Miropiko Pā, one of the six pās in Hamilton, lay just to the south in Claudelands.

== Education ==
Waikato Diocesan School is a private girls secondary school (years 9-13) with boarding facilities. It has a roll of 688 as of October 2025. It opened in 1928 and moved to its current site in 1930.

== Notable buildings ==
- Bankwood House, 660 River Road, is a residence designed by Thomas Henry White and built in 1892 on what was then rural land.
