= Chartwell Shopping Centre =

Shopping centre in Hamilton, New Zealand

- Location: Chartwell, Hamilton, New Zealand
- Coordinates: 37°45′03″S 175°16′45″E
- Opened: 1974
- Manager: Stride Property Group
- Owner: Stride Property Group
- Num. of stores: 110+
- Num. of anchor tenants: 3; Farmers, Event Cinemas, Countdown
- Floor area: 29,024 m^{2} (312,412 sq ft)
- Floors: 3
- Parking: ~1,000 spaces
- Website: chartwellshopping.co.nz

The former logo of Chartwell Square

Chartwell Shopping Centre is a shopping centre, owned by Stride Property, and is located on a 4.22-hectare (10.43-acre) site in the suburb of Chartwell, 5.6 kilometres (3.5 mi) north of Hamilton, New Zealand.

Stride Property took over ownership of Chartwell Shopping Centre in 2015, as a result of this, Chartwell Shopping Centre is no longer part of the Westfield Group and Westfield gift cards are not accepted. The shopping centre is informally referred to as Chartwell Square by many Hamilton residents, as this was its original name.

== History and development ==
The centre was opened in 1974, and underwent a major redevelopment in 1992.

Between 2005 and 2007 Chartwell underwent a NZ$40 million upgrade by Westfield Group. This saw the opening of an Event Cinema complex, a new food court with 450 seats, multi-storey car parking for 270 vehicles, and many new stores in place. The grand opening of the refurbished Westfield was scheduled for Thursday, 7 December 2006, but the opening of the Cinema was delayed until Thursday, 17 May 2007.

In January 2010 Westfield Chartwell committed NZ$33million towards another upgrade, which was completed in October of the same year. This expansion included a new two level Farmers department store and the opening of several new stores.

In November 2015, Stride Property announced they would be purchasing the Chartwell Shopping Centre from Scentre Group. It had agreed to pay $445 million for the Westfield Queensgate shopping centre in Lower Hutt and the Westfield Chartwell shopping centre in Hamilton. The rebrand took effect in August 2016.
