= Hillcrest, Hamilton =

Suburb of Hamilton, New Zealand

Hillcrest
- Suburb
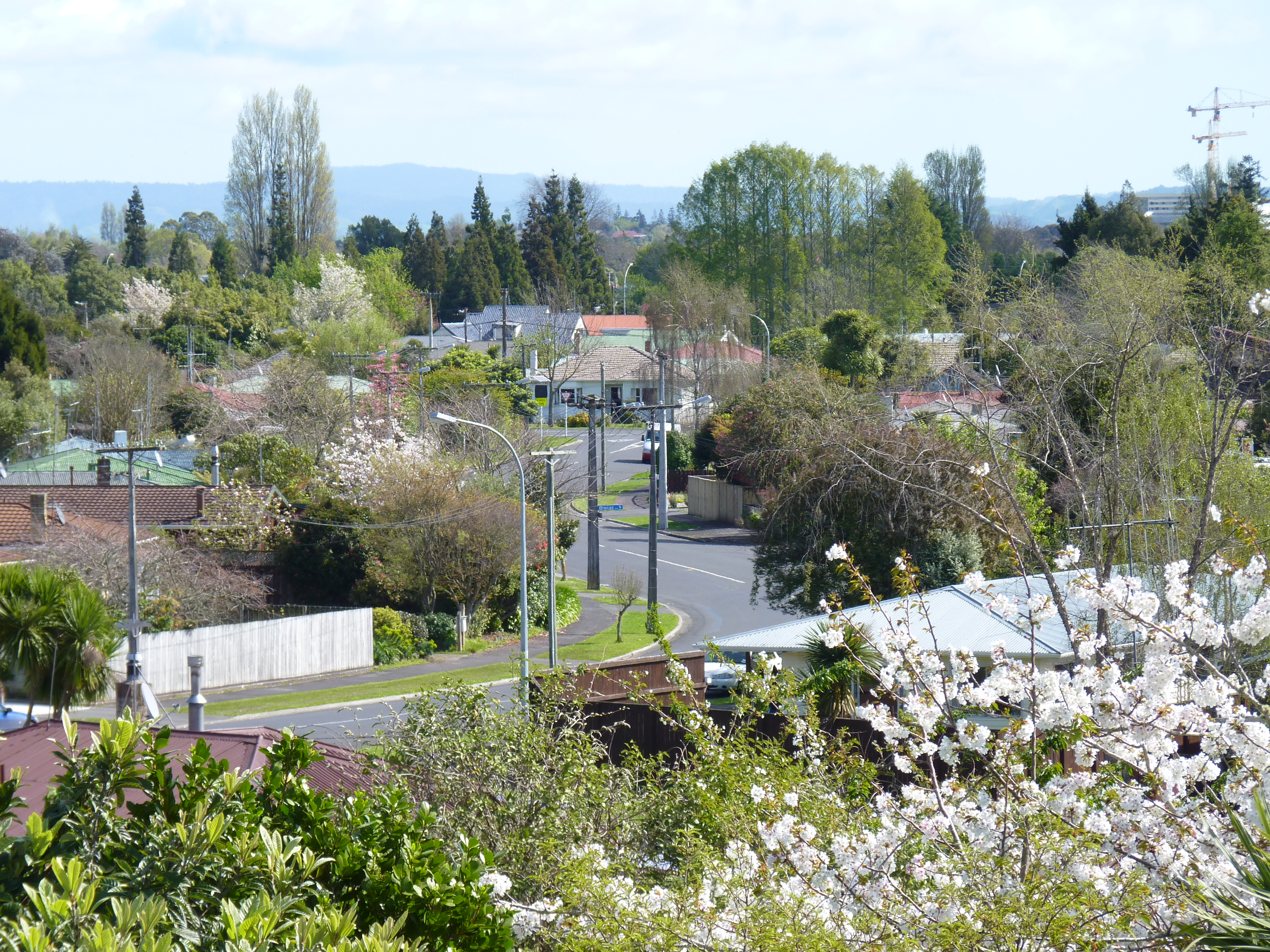
- A neighbourhood in Hillcrest, Hamilton
- Interactive map of Hillcrest
- Coordinates: 37°47′52″S 175°18′54″E
- Country: New Zealand
- City: Hamilton, New Zealand
- Local authority: Hamilton City Council
- Electoral ward: East Ward
- Established: 1949

Area
  - Land: 191 ha (470 acres)

Population (June 2025)
  - Total: 7,000
  - Density: 3,700/km^{2} (9,500/sq mi)

Claudelands	Ruakura	Silverdale
Hamilton East	Hillcrest	Matangi
	Riverlea	Tamahere

Hillcrest is a suburb in southeastern Hamilton in New Zealand. The suburb is home to the University of Waikato and consequently has a large student population. It is located on the east side of the Hamilton Town Belt, a series of public parks that run from the Hamilton Gardens to Ruakura in its eastern section.

== History ==
The area was formerly known as Steele's Hill, named after Capt. W. Steele. Much of it was covered in orchards in the early 1900s. It was named Hillcrest by the Waikato County Council in the 1940s when the area began developing as a suburb. Hillcrest became a part of Hamilton in 1949, with the 5th boundary extension. Significant development took place throughout the 1950s and 1960s.

== Notable locations ==
=== University of Waikato ===
The main campus of the University of Waikato was established in 1964. In 2010, the university had 13,089 students enrolled, the majority based at the Hillcrest campus.

=== Academy of Performing Arts ===
Opened in 2001, the Academy of Performing Arts is a prominent music and theatre venue in Hamilton. Its concert chamber is one of Hamilton's premier classical music venues.

=== Former Hamilton Railway Station ===
The Station on Hillcrest Road is the former main railway station for Hamilton. The building was relocated from Victoria Street to its current Hillcrest location in the 1960s, when the Hamilton Central underground train station was built. It is one of the few surviving railway stations that were built during the time that Julius Vogel was in charge of New Zealand's Public Works Department.

== Demographics ==
Hillcrest covers 1.91 km^{2} (0.74 sq mi) and had an estimated population of 7,000 as of June 2025, with a population density of 3,665 people per km^{2}.

Historical population
Year	Pop.	±% p.a.
2006	5,133	—
2013	5,454	+0.87%
2018	5,910	+1.62%
2023	6,198	+0.96%
The 2006 population is for a smaller area of 1.89 km^{2}. Source:

Hillcrest had a population of 6,198 in the 2023 New Zealand census, an increase of 288 people (4.9%) since the 2018 census, and an increase of 744 people (13.6%) since the 2013 census. There were 3,132 males, 3,027 females, and 36 people of other genders in 1,953 dwellings. 5.5% of people identified as LGBTQ+. The median age was 28.8 years (compared with 38.1 years nationally). There were 1,182 people (19.1%) aged under 15 years, 2,031 (32.8%) aged 15 to 29, 2,517 (40.6%) aged 30 to 64, and 471 (7.6%) aged 65 or older.

People could identify as more than one ethnicity. The results were 54.3% European (Pākehā); 19.9% Māori; 6.3% Pasifika; 30.3% Asian; 3.0% Middle Eastern, Latin American, and African New Zealanders (MELAA); and 1.7% other, which includes people giving their ethnicity as "New Zealander". English was spoken by 93.4%, Māori by 6.1%, Samoan by 0.8%, and other languages by 27.7%. 1.8% spoke no language (e.g., too young to talk). New Zealand Sign Language was known by 0.7%. The percentage of people born overseas was 40.1, compared with 28.8% nationally.

Religious affiliations were 28.5% Christian, 3.5% Hindu, 4.6% Islam, 1.2% Māori religious beliefs, 3.4% Buddhist, 0.4% New Age, 0.1% Jewish, and 2.7% other religions. People who answered that they had no religion were 49.1%, and 6.5% of people did not answer the census question.

Of those at least 15 years old, 1,716 (34.2%) people had a bachelor's or higher degree, 2,271 (45.3%) had a post-high school certificate or diploma, and 1,026 (20.5%) people exclusively held high school qualifications. The median income was $36,400, compared with $41,500 nationally. 399 people (8.0%) earned over $100,000, compared to 12.1% nationally. The employment status of those at least 15 was 2,511 (50.1%) full-time, 756 (15.1%) part-time, and 261 (5.2%) unemployed.

Individual statistical areas
Name	Area (km^{2})	Population	Density (per km^{2})	Dwellings	Median age	Median income
Hillcrest West	0.89	2,973	3,340	945	28.4 years	$35,600
Hillcrest East	1.02	3,225	3,162	1,008	29.1 years	$37,100
New Zealand					38.1 years	$41,500

The 2013 Index of Socioeconomic Deprivation, ranked 1-10 from lowest to most deprived areas, lists the University section of Hillcrest at 8/10 (high deprivation) and the Hillcrest West section at 6/10 (moderate deprivation).

== Education ==
Hillcrest Normal School and Knighton Normal School are state co-educational contributing primary schools (years 1-6) with rolls of 617 and 669 students respectively. Hillcrest Normal opened in 1923, and Knighton Normal opened in 1957. The term "Normal" comes from the French term école normale and means these schools assist in the training of teachers.

St John's College is a single-sex integrated Catholic secondary school (years 9-13) with a roll of 958.

Rolls are as of July 2025.

Despite the name, Hillcrest High School is actually located in the neighbouring suburb of Silverdale.

== See also ==
- List of streets in Hamilton
- Suburbs of Hamilton, New Zealand
