= Silverdale, Hamilton =

Suburb of Hamilton, New Zealand

Silverdale
- Suburb
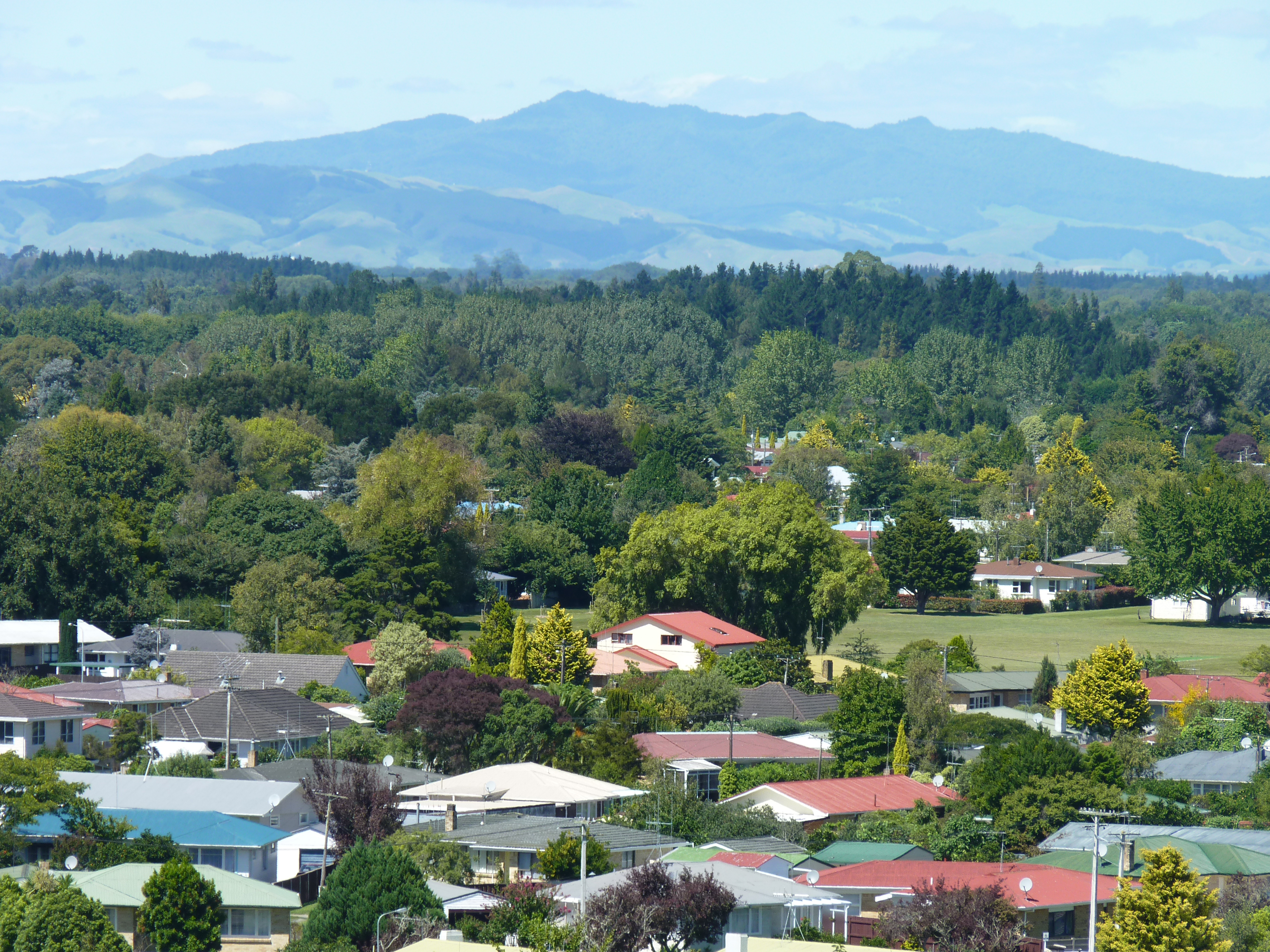
- Silverdale, from the University of Waikato.
- Interactive map of Silverdale
- Coordinates: 37°47′33.7″S 175°19′42.65″E
- Country: New Zealand
- City: Hamilton, New Zealand
- Local authority: Hamilton City Council
- Electoral ward: East Ward
- Established: 1962

Area
  - Land: 80 ha (200 acres)

Population (June 2025)
  - Total: 2,290
  - Density: 2,900/km^{2} (7,400/sq mi)

	Ruakura
Hillcrest	Silverdale
	Riverlea

Silverdale is a suburb in south-eastern Hamilton in New Zealand. It is east from Hillcrest and home to Hillcrest High School, despite the school's name. Part of Silverdale is covered by the University of Waikato.

== History ==
It was named Silverdale after the original farm on the land, which itself was named after the shining silver poplar leaves.

== Features of Silverdale ==
The suburb forms a large part of the University of Waikato's commercial, residential and educational hinterland. Jansen Park, located between Morrinsville Rd and Masters Ave, is the biggest park in the area and is used by Hillcrest United and Waikato Unicol Football soccer during the winter season. The main suburban shopping centre is located on Silverdale Rd.

== Demographics ==
Silverdale covers 0.80 km^{2} (0.31 sq mi) and had an estimated population of 2,290 as of June 2025, with a population density of 2,863 people per km^{2}.

Historical population
Year	Pop.	±% p.a.
2006	1,929	—
2013	1,944	+0.11%
2018	2,088	+1.44%
2023	2,079	−0.09%

Silverdale had a population of 2,079 in the 2023 New Zealand census, a decrease of 9 people (−0.4%) since the 2018 census, and an increase of 135 people (6.9%) since the 2013 census. There were 987 males, 1,077 females and 15 people of other genders in 777 dwellings. 5.6% of people identified as LGBTIQ+. The median age was 30.3 years (compared with 38.1 years nationally). There were 387 people (18.6%) aged under 15 years, 636 (30.6%) aged 15 to 29, 798 (38.4%) aged 30 to 64, and 258 (12.4%) aged 65 or older.

People could identify as more than one ethnicity. The results were 57.4% European (Pākehā); 20.9% Māori; 6.1% Pasifika; 25.4% Asian; 2.3% Middle Eastern, Latin American and African New Zealanders (MELAA); and 1.4% other, which includes people giving their ethnicity as "New Zealander". English was spoken by 93.5%, Māori language by 5.1%, Samoan by 0.6%, and other languages by 22.8%. No language could be spoken by 2.5% (e.g. too young to talk). New Zealand Sign Language was known by 0.4%. The percentage of people born overseas was 34.8, compared with 28.8% nationally.

Religious affiliations were 27.7% Christian, 3.3% Hindu, 2.3% Islam, 1.3% Māori religious beliefs, 2.9% Buddhist, 0.6% New Age, and 2.9% other religions. People who answered that they had no religion were 53.0%, and 6.2% of people did not answer the census question.

Of those at least 15 years old, 510 (30.1%) people had a bachelor's or higher degree, 795 (47.0%) had a post-high school certificate or diploma, and 387 (22.9%) people exclusively held high school qualifications. The median income was $35,000, compared with $41,500 nationally. 90 people (5.3%) earned over $100,000 compared to 12.1% nationally. The employment status of those at least 15 was that 816 (48.2%) people were employed full-time, 225 (13.3%) were part-time, and 84 (5.0%) were unemployed.

The 2013 Index of Socioeconomic Deprivation, ranked 1-10 from lowest to most deprived areas, lists Silverdale at 8/10 (high deprivation).

== Education ==
Hillcrest High School is a state secondary school (years 9–13) with a roll of 1772. The school opened in 1972.

Silverdale Normal School is a state contributing primary school (years 1–6) with a roll of 382. It opened in 1964.

Both schools are coeducational. Rolls are as of July 2025.

== See also ==
- List of streets in Hamilton
- Suburbs of Hamilton, New Zealand
