= Puketaha =

- Rural community
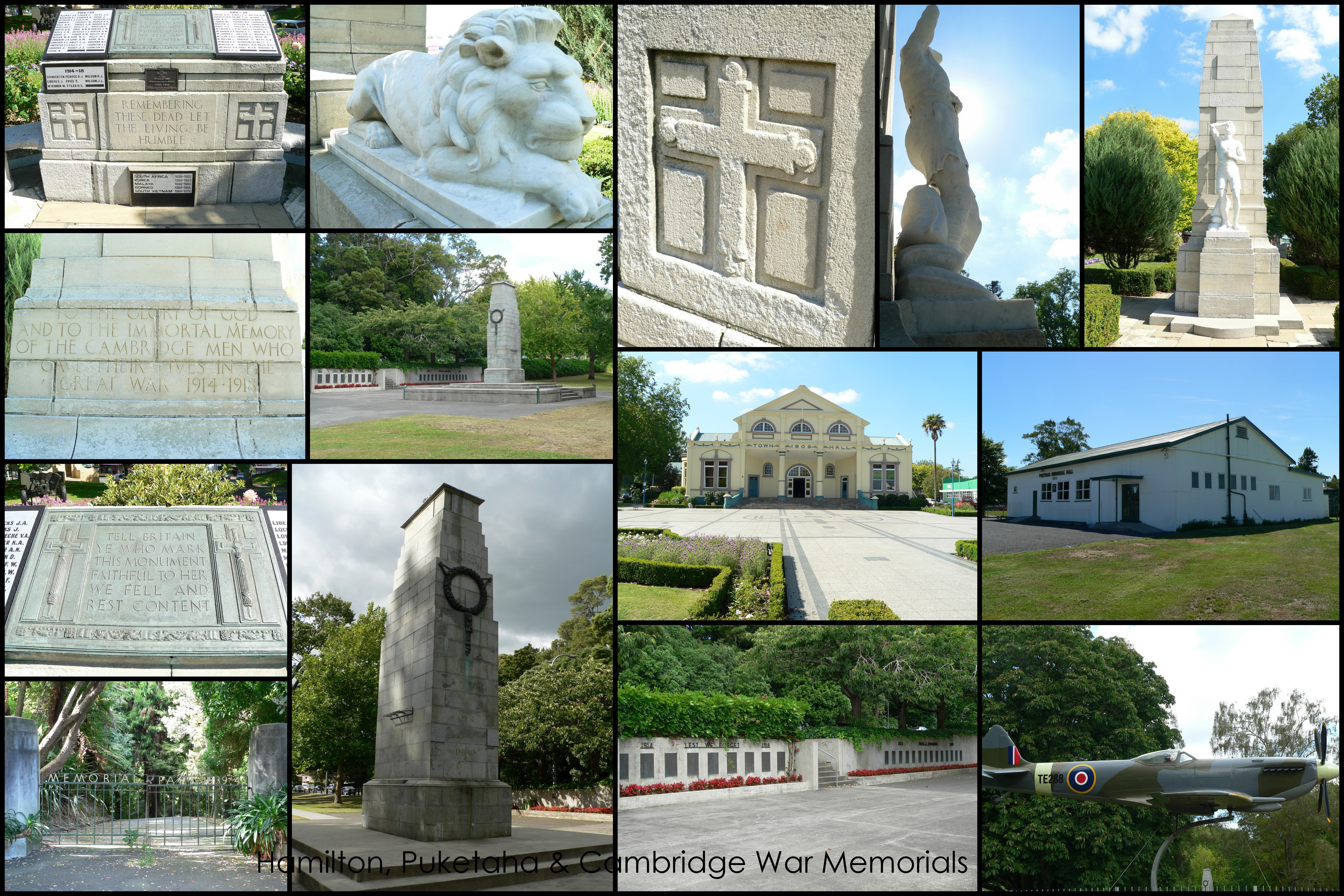
- Hamilton Puketaha & Cambridge war memorials
- Interactive map of Puketaha
- Coordinates: 37.720615°S 175.326971°E
- Country: New Zealand
- Region: Waikato
- District: Waikato District
- Wards: Tamahere-Woodlands General Ward; Tai Runga Takiwaa Maaori Ward
- Electorates: Waikato; Hauraki-Waikato (Māori)

Government
  - Territorial Authority: Waikato District Council
  - Regional council: Waikato Regional Council
  - Mayor of Waikato: Aksel Bech
  - Waikato MP: Tim van de Molen
  - Hauraki-Waikato MP: Hana-Rawhiti Maipi-Clarke

Area
  - Total: 25.68 km^{2} (9.92 sq mi)

Population (2023 Census)
  - Total: 771
  - Density: 30.0/km^{2} (77.8/sq mi)

Puketaha is a rural community in the Waikato District and Waikato region of New Zealand's North Island.

== Demographics ==
Puketaha covers 25.68 km^{2} (9.92 sq mi). It is part of the larger Hamilton Park statistical area.

Historical population
Year	Pop.	±% p.a.
2006	498	—
2013	636	+3.56%
2018	732	+2.85%
2023	771	+1.04%

Puketaha had a population of 771 in the 2023 New Zealand census, an increase of 39 people (5.3%) since the 2018 census, and an increase of 135 people (21.2%) since the 2013 census. There were 402 males and 369 females in 234 dwellings. 2.3% of people identified as LGBTIQ+. There were 180 people (23.3%) aged under 15 years, 147 (19.1%) aged 15 to 29, 345 (44.7%) aged 30 to 64, and 90 (11.7%) aged 65 or older.

People could identify as more than one ethnicity. The results were 80.9% European (Pākehā); 16.7% Māori; 3.5% Pasifika; 10.5% Asian; 1.6% Middle Eastern, Latin American and African New Zealanders (MELAA); and 2.3% other, which includes people giving their ethnicity as "New Zealander". English was spoken by 97.3%, Māori language by 3.9%, Samoan by 0.8%, and other languages by 9.3%. No language could be spoken by 1.2% (e.g. too young to talk). The percentage of people born overseas was 15.2, compared with 28.8% nationally.

Religious affiliations were 37.4% Christian, 1.2% Hindu, 0.8% Islam, 1.2% Buddhist, 0.4% New Age, and 2.3% other religions. People who answered that they had no religion were 48.6%, and 8.6% of people did not answer the census question.

Of those at least 15 years old, 162 (27.4%) people had a bachelor's or higher degree, 336 (56.9%) had a post-high school certificate or diploma, and 102 (17.3%) people exclusively held high school qualifications. 99 people (16.8%) earned over $100,000 compared to 12.1% nationally. The employment status of those at least 15 was that 321 (54.3%) people were employed full-time, 96 (16.2%) were part-time, and 6 (1.0%) were unemployed.

== Education ==
Puketaha School is a co-educational state primary school for Year 1 to 8 students with a roll of 300 as of July 2026. The school opened in 1916.
