= Chartwell, Hamilton =

Suburb of Hamilton, New Zealand

Chartwell
- Suburb
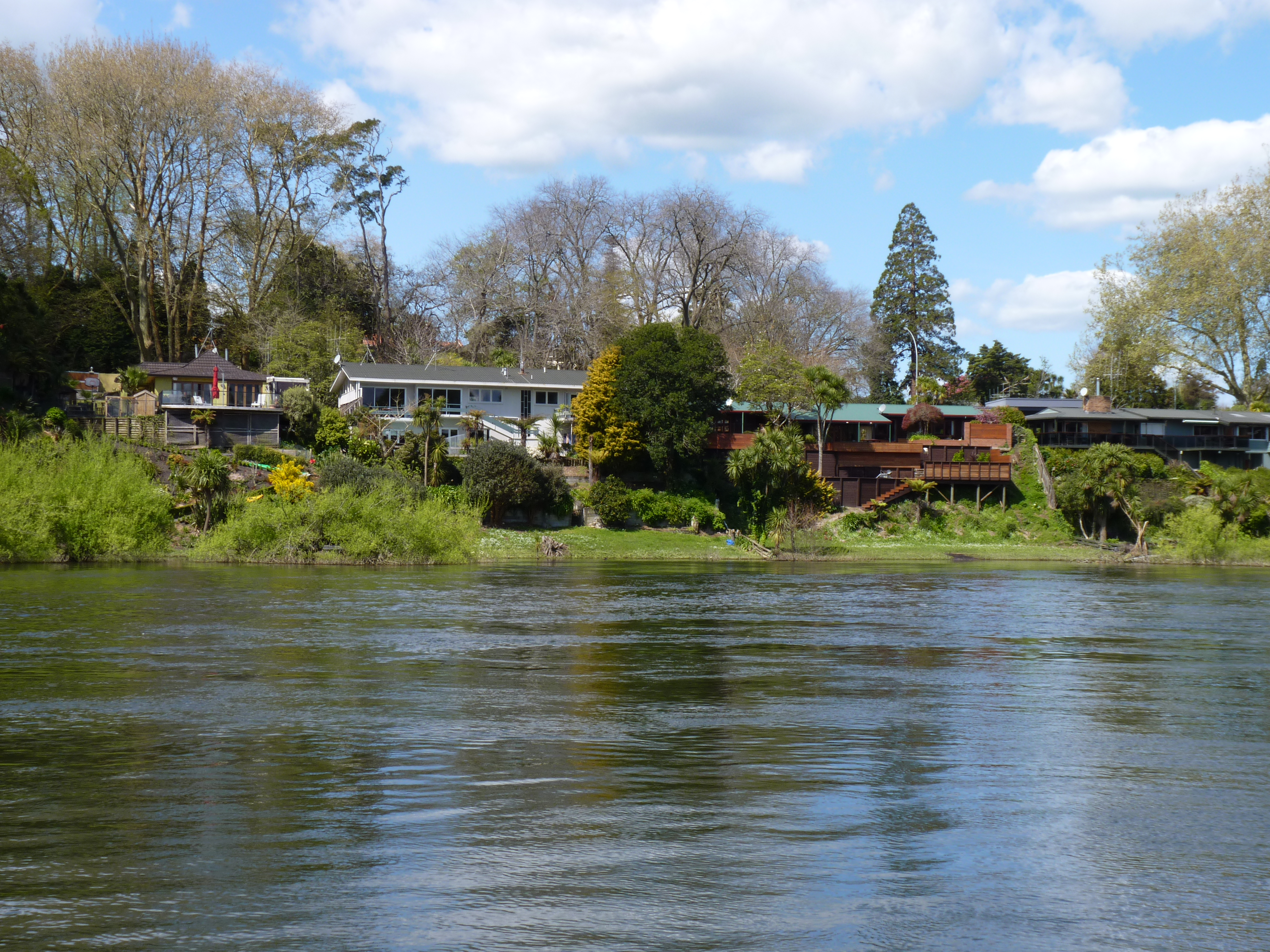
- Houses on River Rd, Chartwell along the Waikato River
- Interactive map of Chartwell
- Coordinates: 37°45′38.06″S 175°16′34.4″E
- Country: New Zealand
- City: Hamilton, New Zealand
- Local authority: Hamilton City Council
- Electoral ward: East Ward
- Established: 1962

Area
  - Land: 213 ha (530 acres)

Population (June 2025)
  - Total: 5,730
  - Density: 2,690/km^{2} (6,970/sq mi)

Queenwood	Rototuna	Chedworth Park
River Road	Chartwell	Fairview Downs
	Fairfield

Chartwell is a suburb in north-eastern Hamilton, New Zealand. The suburb was named after Chartwell, the country home of Sir Winston Churchill. The area became a part of Hamilton in June 1962 and was officially defined as a suburb in 1974. Most of the housing is private single or 2 level dwellings with little state housing. Streets near the square are used for parking. Private dwellings are being purchased by professionals to be used as business premises close to the square. The streets are well planted with trees.

== Features of Chartwell ==
=== Lynden Court ===
Chartwell's main shopping area is located on Lynden Court. Chartwell Shopping Centre is one of Hamilton's major malls. It has a 6 cinema multiplex as well as 126 retail shops, cafes and restaurants. The Chartwell Library and the Lynden Court Mall are located on the other side of the road. Lynden Court is one of Hamilton's major transport hubs, with bus routes heading into Hamilton Central, Rototuna and the city Orbiter route.

=== Chartwell Park ===
Chartwell Park is located in between the suburbs of Chartwell and Queenwood. It features a walkway connecting these two suburbs. Chartwell Park has five football (soccer) fields. These are the home ground playing fields for St. Joseph's Catholic School's football teams.

=== Kumara Pit ===
To the northern end of Hukanui Road, there is an archaeological kumara pit. The pit is 2m deep and 8m wide in a circle shape. The pits were made by Maori who used the dug out sand and gravel to cover growing kumara plants. The sand conducted heat to make an artificial tropical climate for the kumara plants which naturally grow in Southern America. Because of the archaeological significance of these pits, the construction of the Wairere Drive/Hukanui Road intersection was made so that the pits would not be affected.

=== Swarbrick Landing ===
Swarbrick's Landing is a small park beside the Waikato River, linked by a riverside walkway to Day's Park. It has a jetty, which is served by a ferry to the museum.

== Demographics ==
Chartwell covers 2.13 km^{2} (0.82 sq mi) and had an estimated population of 5,730 as of June 2025, with a population density of 2,690 people per km^{2}.

Historical population
Year	Pop.	±% p.a.
2006	4,671	—
2013	4,710	+0.12%
2018	5,136	+1.75%
2023	5,262	+0.49%

Chartwell had a population of 5,262 in the 2023 New Zealand census, an increase of 126 people (2.5%) since the 2018 census, and an increase of 552 people (11.7%) since the 2013 census. There were 2,571 males, 2,673 females and 15 people of other genders in 1,734 dwellings. 3.4% of people identified as LGBTIQ+. There were 1,227 people (23.3%) aged under 15 years, 1,293 (24.6%) aged 15 to 29, 2,082 (39.6%) aged 30 to 64, and 660 (12.5%) aged 65 or older.

People could identify as more than one ethnicity. The results were 51.8% European (Pākehā); 34.8% Māori; 10.5% Pasifika; 17.0% Asian; 3.9% Middle Eastern, Latin American and African New Zealanders (MELAA); and 2.2% other, which includes people giving their ethnicity as "New Zealander". English was spoken by 92.6%, Māori language by 8.8%, Samoan by 2.0%, and other languages by 18.7%. No language could be spoken by 2.7% (e.g. too young to talk). New Zealand Sign Language was known by 0.6%. The percentage of people born overseas was 26.3, compared with 28.8% nationally.

Religious affiliations were 33.8% Christian, 2.9% Hindu, 3.1% Islam, 2.1% Māori religious beliefs, 1.7% Buddhist, 0.3% New Age, 0.1% Jewish, and 2.3% other religions. People who answered that they had no religion were 47.2%, and 6.6% of people did not answer the census question.

Of those at least 15 years old, 900 (22.3%) people had a bachelor's or higher degree, 1,929 (47.8%) had a post-high school certificate or diploma, and 1,212 (30.0%) people exclusively held high school qualifications. 240 people (5.9%) earned over $100,000 compared to 12.1% nationally. The employment status of those at least 15 was that 1,875 (46.5%) people were employed full-time, 495 (12.3%) were part-time, and 204 (5.1%) were unemployed.

Individual statistical areas
Name	Area (km^{2})	Population	Density (per km^{2})	Dwellings	Median age	Median income
Chartwell	0.90	2,586	2,873	837	31.3 years	$32,000
Porritt	1.23	2,676	2,176	897	31.0 years	$35,100
New Zealand					38.1 years	$41,500

== Education ==
Hukanui School is a coeducational contributing primary school (years 1-6) with a roll of 826. The school was the first to win the National Green Gold Enviro Schools Award in May 2006.

Bankwood School is a coeducational contributing primary school (years 1-6) with a roll of 339.

St Paul's Collegiate School is a private secondary school (years 9-13) with a roll of 875. The senior years (year 11 and above) are co-educational, and the junior years are for boys. The school opened in 1959, and was single-sex boys until 1985. It is part boarding school, modelled along the lines of an English public school. It is on the border between Chartwell and Fairfield and its fields adjoin Fairfield Intermediate.

Rolls are as of July 2025.

The nearest state secondary school is Fairfield College.

== See also ==
- List of streets in Hamilton
- Suburbs of Hamilton, New Zealand
