= Newstead, New Zealand =

Locality in Waikato, New Zealand

Coordinates: 37.782908°S 175.351504°E

Newstead
- Interactive map of Newstead
- Country: New Zealand
- Region: Waikato
- District: Waikato District
- Ward: Tamahere-Woodlands General Ward; Tai Runga Takiwaa Maaori Ward
- Electorates: Waikato; Hauraki-Waikato (Māori)

Government
  - Territorial Authority: Waikato District Council
  - Regional council: Waikato Regional Council
  - Mayor of Waikato: Aksel Bech
  - Waikato MP: Tim van de Molen
  - Hauraki-Waikato MP: Hana-Rawhiti Maipi-Clarke

Area
  - Total: 17.40 km^{2} (6.72 sq mi)

Population (2023 Census)
  - Total: 789
  - Density: 45.3/km^{2} (117/sq mi)

Newstead is a rural settlement on the outskirts of Hamilton, in the Waikato District and Waikato region of New Zealand's North Island.

The settlement includes the global headquarters of Livestock Improvement Corporation, a multinational farming co-operative which provides genetics information to the dairy sector. The campus, established in 1951, is a combined farm, laboratory, testing facility and research centre.

Hamilton Park Cemetery, Hamilton's main operational cemetery, is located just west of the settlement. It consists of burial lawns, a crematorium and two chapels, and is operated by Hamilton City Council.

== Demographics ==
Newstead covers 17.40 km^{2} (6.72 sq mi). It is part of the larger Hamilton Park statistical area.

Historical population for Newstead
| Year | Pop. | ±% p.a. |
|---|---|---|
| 2006 | 480 | — |
| 2013 | 615 | +3.60% |
| 2018 | 744 | +3.88% |
| 2023 | 789 | +1.18% |

Newstead had a population of 789 in the 2023 New Zealand census, an increase of 45 people (6.0%) since the 2018 census, and an increase of 174 people (28.3%) since the 2013 census. There were 399 males, 387 females and 9 people of other genders in 243 dwellings. 3.8% of people identified as LGBTIQ+. There were 162 people (20.5%) aged under 15 years, 138 (17.5%) aged 15 to 29, 375 (47.5%) aged 30 to 64, and 108 (13.7%) aged 65 or older.

People could identify as more than one ethnicity. The results were 82.9% European (Pākehā); 13.7% Māori; 1.9% Pasifika; 8.7% Asian; 3.0% Middle Eastern, Latin American and African New Zealanders (MELAA); and 1.5% other, which includes people giving their ethnicity as "New Zealander". English was spoken by 97.0%, Māori language by 2.7%, and other languages by 12.5%. No language could be spoken by 2.3% (e.g. too young to talk). New Zealand Sign Language was known by 1.1%. The percentage of people born overseas was 17.1, compared with 28.8% nationally.

Religious affiliations were 34.2% Christian, 0.4% Hindu, 1.9% Islam, 0.8% Māori religious beliefs, 0.4% Buddhist, 0.4% New Age, and 3.0% other religions. People who answered that they had no religion were 52.9%, and 7.2% of people did not answer the census question.

Of those at least 15 years old, 168 (26.8%) people had a bachelor's or higher degree, 336 (53.6%) had a post-high school certificate or diploma, and 111 (17.7%) people exclusively held high school qualifications. 117 people (18.7%) earned over $100,000 compared to 12.1% nationally. The employment status of those at least 15 was that 342 (54.5%) people were employed full-time, 105 (16.7%) were part-time, and 9 (1.4%) were unemployed.

=== Hamilton Park statistical area ===
Hamilton Park statistical area, which also includes Puketaha, covers 46.32 km^{2} (17.88 sq mi) and had an estimated population of 1,730 as of June 2025, with a population density of 37 people per km^{2}.

Historical population for Hamilton Park
| Year | Pop. | ±% p.a. |
|---|---|---|
| 2006 | 1,062 | — |
| 2013 | 1,329 | +3.26% |
| 2018 | 1,593 | +3.69% |
| 2023 | 1,677 | +1.03% |

Hamilton Park had a population of 1,677 in the 2023 New Zealand census, an increase of 84 people (5.3%) since the 2018 census, and an increase of 348 people (26.2%) since the 2013 census. There were 861 males, 807 females and 9 people of other genders in 519 dwellings. 3.4% of people identified as LGBTIQ+. The median age was 37.9 years (compared with 38.1 years nationally). There were 378 people (22.5%) aged under 15 years, 312 (18.6%) aged 15 to 29, 777 (46.3%) aged 30 to 64, and 213 (12.7%) aged 65 or older.

People could identify as more than one ethnicity. The results were 83.2% European (Pākehā); 14.7% Māori; 2.7% Pasifika; 9.7% Asian; 2.3% Middle Eastern, Latin American and African New Zealanders (MELAA); and 2.5% other, which includes people giving their ethnicity as "New Zealander". English was spoken by 97.0%, Māori language by 3.0%, Samoan by 0.4%, and other languages by 11.1%. No language could be spoken by 1.4% (e.g. too young to talk). New Zealand Sign Language was known by 0.4%. The percentage of people born overseas was 15.7, compared with 28.8% nationally.

Religious affiliations were 36.1% Christian, 0.5% Hindu, 1.1% Islam, 0.5% Māori religious beliefs, 0.5% Buddhist, 0.4% New Age, and 2.3% other religions. People who answered that they had no religion were 51.2%, and 7.5% of people did not answer the census question.

Of those at least 15 years old, 372 (28.6%) people had a bachelor's or higher degree, 711 (54.7%) had a post-high school certificate or diploma, and 216 (16.6%) people exclusively held high school qualifications. The median income was $49,300, compared with $41,500 nationally. 231 people (17.8%) earned over $100,000 compared to 12.1% nationally. The employment status of those at least 15 was that 729 (56.1%) people were employed full-time, 213 (16.4%) were part-time, and 18 (1.4%) were unemployed.

== History ==
=== 19th century ===
James Runciman, a Scottish-born captain in the Waikato War, took over the 1517 acres at Newstead in the mid-1860s, establishing the Marsh Meadows farm. He travelled to the United States in 1882 to investigate cheese-making and briefly established a cheese-making factory, but closed it due to financial difficulties. He also experimented with sugar beet.

Runciman donated 20 acres to establish Marsh Meadows School, which opened in 1890. It later became Newstead School.

He regularly planted trees, or donated trees for school children to plant on special occasions. By 1889, he had planted 50,000 trees. Most were milled, but some were still standing by the 21st century.

John Levis, a farmer born in County Cork, Ireland, settled on 153 acres in Newstead in 1884. He also became active on the local school committee.

Bank of New Zealand appointed John Graham, a native of County Tyrone, Ireland, as the manager of the New Zealand Loan and Mercantile Agency Company's Woodside pastoral property in 1886. By 1902, it had between 2000 and 3000 sheep.

Henry Reynolds purchased 1600 acres of land in Newstead in 1886, establishing the Newstead Estate. He set up the first creamery on his farm in 1890.

The New Zealand Dairy Association established a creamery at the site in 1900. The plant had an 8 horse-power portable engine, and a processing capacity of 300 gallons. During its first season the factory had 10 suppliers, and processed the milk of 350 cows each day.

=== 20th century ===
By 1902 the settlement had a post office and was connected to the rail network.

The first telephone line to Newstead was from the Woodlands Estate at Gordonton, where Reynolds had previously lived and worked. The road is still called Telephone Road.

=== 21st century ===
In February 2011, Private Kirifi Mila was buried at Newstead's Hamilton Park Cemetery, after being killed in preventable workplace accident during service in the War in Afghanistan. The burial was attended by family members and dignitaries, including Sam Lotu-Iiga.

A new reception and lounge facility was proposed for the cemetery in 2015 but the plan was scrapped.

As of 2017, the cemetery was busy seven days a week and was considering extending operations to 10 hours a day. It is projected to face rising demand until at least 2045.

New CCTV security cameras were installed at the cemetery in 2019, in an attempt to stop burnouts and vandalism. It followed several cases of threatening, aggressive and anti-social behaviour.

== Education ==
Newstead Model School is a co-educational state primary school for Year 1 to 6 students with a roll of 151 as of July 2026.

The school was established in 1890 and held centennial celebrations in 1990.
