= Stonebridge, New Zealand =

Stonebridge
- Suburb
- Interactive map of Stonebridge
- Coordinates: 37°47′58.36″S 175°13′12.01″E
- Country: New Zealand
- City: Waikato District
- Electoral ward: Hamilton West

Area
  - Land: 123 ha (300 acres)

Population (2013)
  - Total: 93
  - Density: 76/km^{2} (200/sq mi)

Grandview Heights	Western Heights	Dinsdale
Whatawhata	Stonebridge
Taitua Arboretum	Temple View	Deanwell

Stonebridge, also known as Stonebridge Estate, is a suburb close to the western boundary of Hamilton in New Zealand. It adjoins Dinsdale to the east and Western Heights to the north. The suburb was farmland until development began about 1996; a large farming operation still takes place in the land between sections today. The land is mainly rolling with a winding gully. Developers have modified the existing vegetation and landscape to create a series of ponds connected by a creek.

In 2013 meshblock 0978002 had a population of 93 living in 33 houses.

== See also ==
- Suburbs of Hamilton, New Zealand
