= Suburbs of Hamilton, New Zealand =

This is a list of Hamilton, New Zealand suburbs.

- Aberdeen
- Ashmore
- Bader
- Beerescourt
- Burbush
- Callum Brae
- Chartwell
- Chedworth Park
- Claudelands
- Crawshaw
- Deanwell
- Dinsdale
- Enderley
- Fairfield
- Fairview Downs
- Fitzroy
- Flagstaff
- Forest Lake
- Frankton
- Glenview
- Grandview Heights
- Hamilton Central
- Hamilton East
- Hamilton Lake
- Hamilton North
- Hamilton West
- Harrowfield
- Hillcrest
- Huntington
- Livingstone
- Magellan Rise
- Maeroa
- Melville
- Nawton
- Peacocke
- Pukete
- Queenwood
- River Road
- Riverlea
- Rototuna
- Ruakura
- Silverdale
- Stonebridge
- St Andrews
- St James Park
- Somerset Heights
- Stonebridge
- Te Rapa
- Te Kowhai
- Temple View
- Thornton
- Western Heights
- Whitiora
