= Frankton, Hamilton =

Suburb of Hamilton, New Zealand

Frankton
- Suburb
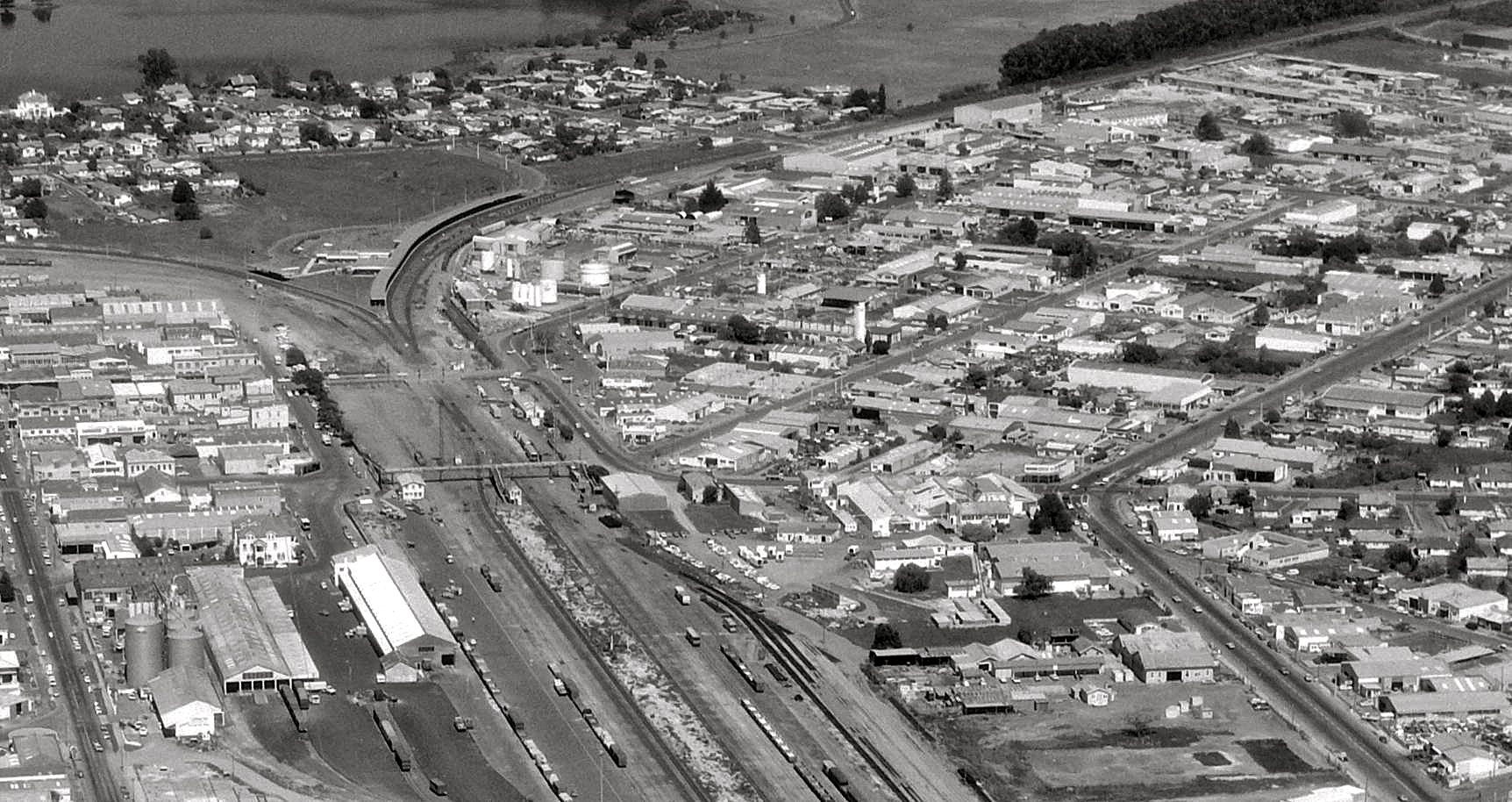
- Frankton Junction in 1980, showing 1975 station and site of the previous station (bottom centre).
- Interactive map of Frankton
- Coordinates: 37.789°S 175.260°E
- Country: New Zealand
- City: Hamilton, New Zealand
- Local authority: Hamilton City Council
- Electoral ward: West Ward
- Established: 1913

Area
  - Land: 522 ha (1,290 acres)

Population (June 2025)
  - Total: 8,370
  - Density: 1,600/km^{2} (4,150/sq mi)

Livingstone	Maeroa	Whitiora
Dinsdale	Frankton	Hamilton Central
Temple View	Melville	Lake Rotoroa

Frankton is a central suburb of the city of Hamilton, New Zealand. It is the site of the city's passenger railway station, a major industrial-commercial stretch of State Highway 1C, and a commercial shopping area.

The new settlement was established in 1877 by Canadian migrant Thomas Jolly and was named Frankton for his son Francis Bertrand Jolly. Frankton Borough Council was formed in 1913 but, after poll conducted in 1916, merged with Hamilton in 1917.

== Demographics ==
Frankton covers 5.22 km^{2} (2.02 sq mi) and had an estimated population of 8,370 as of June 2025, with a population density of 1,603 people per km^{2}.

Historical population
Year	Pop.	±% p.a.
2006	4,788	—
2013	5,670	+2.44%
2018	7,041	+4.43%
2023	7,314	+0.76%
The 2006 population is for a smaller area of 4.83 km^{2}. Source:

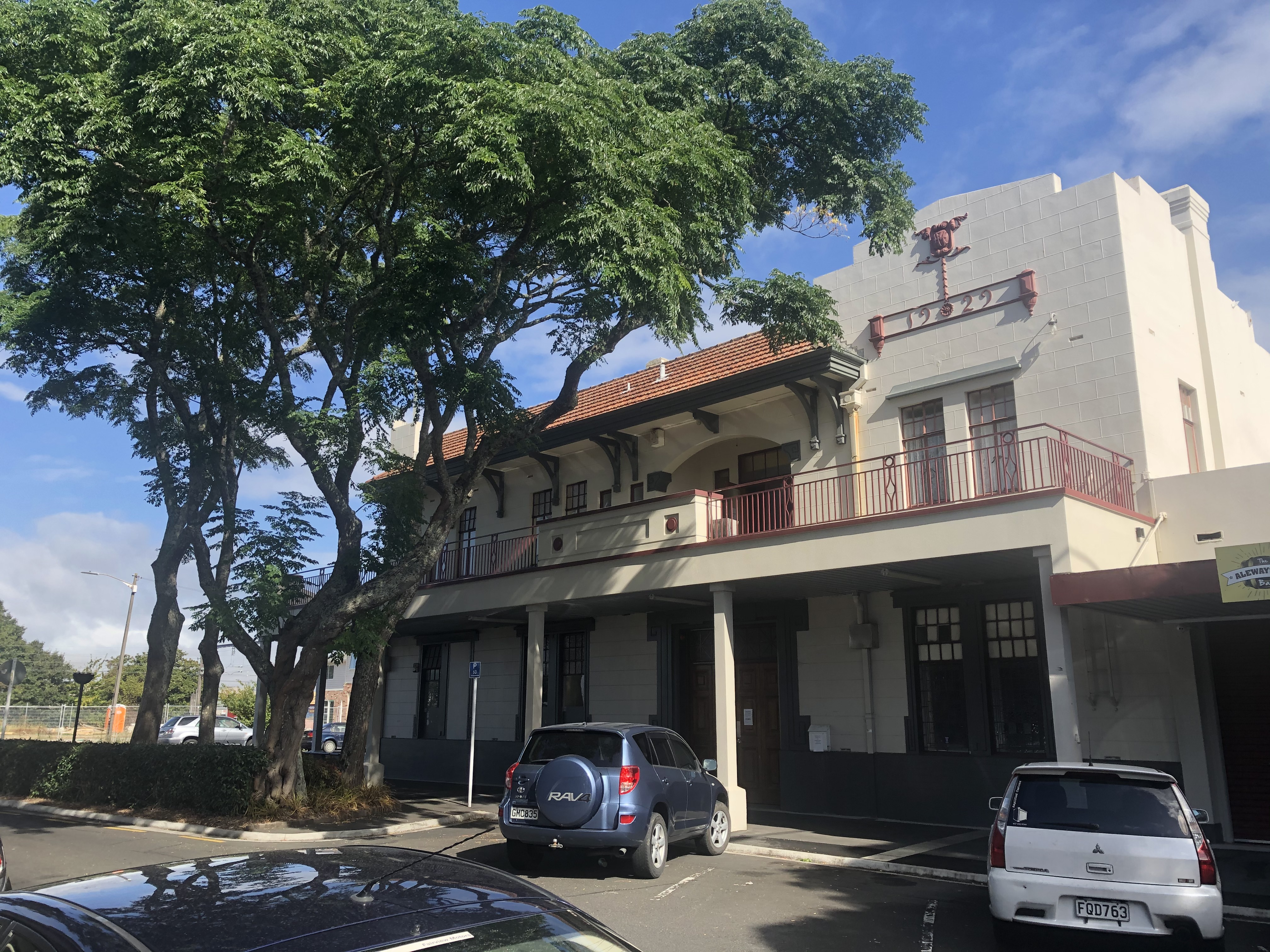
Frankton Hotel, Commerce Street

Frankton had a population of 7,314 in the 2023 New Zealand census, an increase of 273 people (3.9%) since the 2018 census, and an increase of 1,644 people (29.0%) since the 2013 census. There were 3,609 males, 3,669 females and 36 people of other genders in 2,739 dwellings. 3.9% of people identified as LGBTIQ+. The median age was 30.9 years (compared with 38.1 years nationally). There were 1,566 people (21.4%) aged under 15 years, 1,935 (26.5%) aged 15 to 29, 3,138 (42.9%) aged 30 to 64, and 675 (9.2%) aged 65 or older.

People could identify as more than one ethnicity. The results were 51.5% European (Pākehā); 36.3% Māori; 9.3% Pasifika; 22.4% Asian; 1.7% Middle Eastern, Latin American and African New Zealanders (MELAA); and 1.9% other, which includes people giving their ethnicity as "New Zealander". English was spoken by 93.5%, Māori language by 9.8%, Samoan by 1.5%, and other languages by 16.8%. No language could be spoken by 3.4% (e.g. too young to talk). New Zealand Sign Language was known by 0.7%. The percentage of people born overseas was 26.6, compared with 28.8% nationally.

Religious affiliations were 30.3% Christian, 4.4% Hindu, 2.9% Islam, 2.6% Māori religious beliefs, 1.1% Buddhist, 0.6% New Age, and 4.3% other religions. People who answered that they had no religion were 47.4%, and 6.8% of people did not answer the census question.

Of those at least 15 years old, 1,272 (22.1%) people had a bachelor's or higher degree, 2,976 (51.8%) had a post-high school certificate or diploma, and 1,497 (26.0%) people exclusively held high school qualifications. The median income was $42,300, compared with $41,500 nationally. 261 people (4.5%) earned over $100,000 compared to 12.1% nationally. The employment status of those at least 15 was that 3,171 (55.2%) people were employed full-time, 564 (9.8%) were part-time, and 309 (5.4%) were unemployed.

Individual statistical areas
Name	Area (km^{2})	Population	Density (per km^{2})	Dwellings	Median age	Median income
Swarbrick	0.73	3,114	4,266	1,269	31.8 years	$41,500
Kahikatea	0.98	3,522	3,624	1,173	30.0 years	$42,400
Frankton Junction	3.52	675	192	297	31.5 years	$45,800
New Zealand					38.1 years	$41,500

== Railway ==
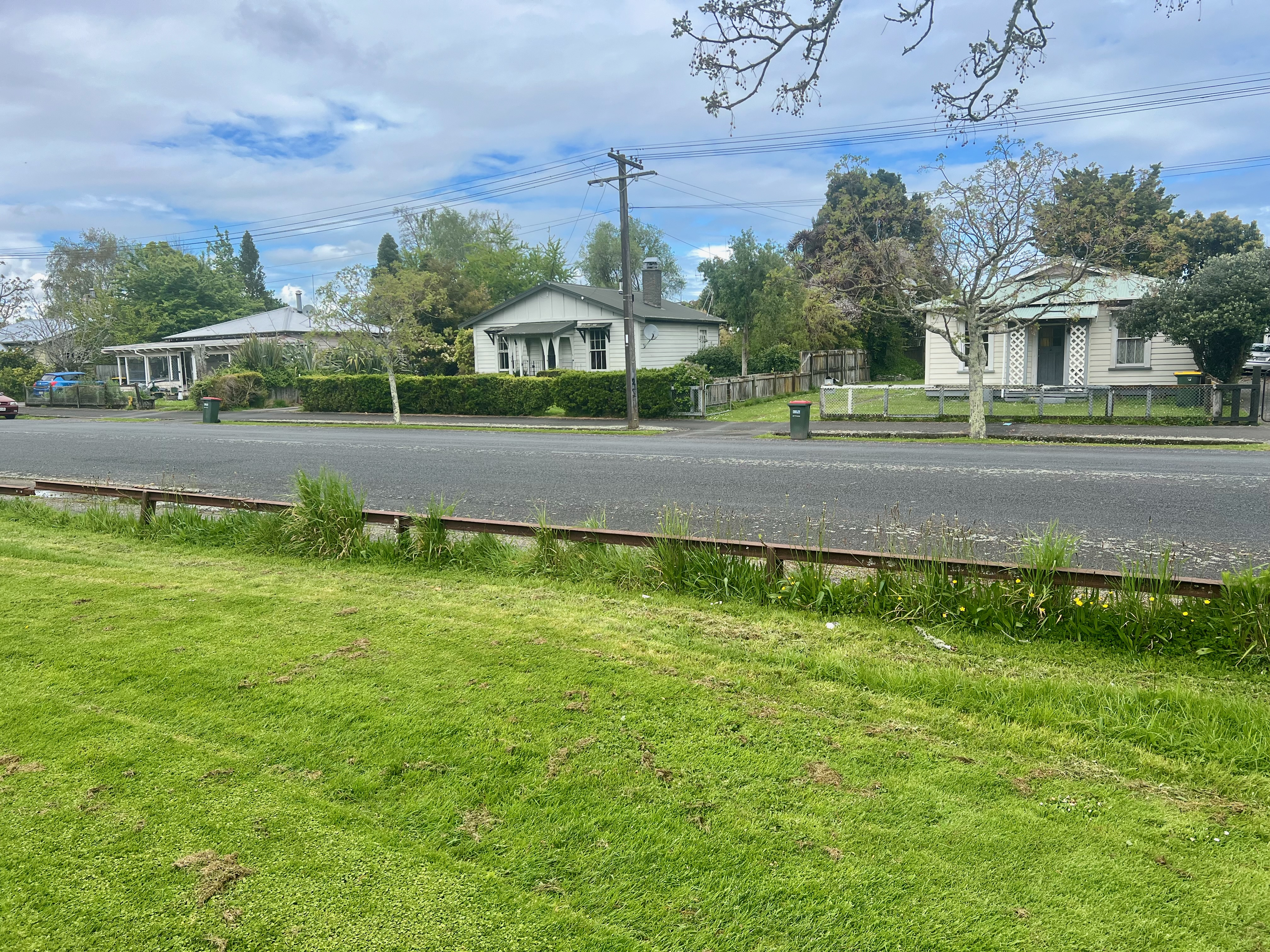
Weka St, model railway village, from Frankton Railway Combined Sports Club field. The boundary of the ground is marked by old railway rails

Frankton is the location of Hamilton's main passenger railway station. The station is sited at the junction of the North Island Main Trunk line (NIMT) and the East Coast Main Trunk line, but passenger services on the East Coast line were discontinued and only the twice a day, Te Huia and the six days a week, Auckland and Wellington, Northern Explorer passenger trains stop. The station was formerly called Frankton Junction, a very important railway station, and included the now-closed Frankton Tea Rooms, where passenger trains without dining cars would stop to allow passengers to purchase food and drinks. Many workshops and railway workers homes were in the area west of the railway.

== Commerce Street ==
The main street of Frankton, Commerce Street, and the streets surrounding it, form one of Hamilton City's largest suburban non-mall shopping areas. The area is dominated by the well-known, locally owned department store, Forlongs Furnishings of Frankton, established in 1946. In 2015 it closed, but reopened in 2016 in part of the store, as a furniture shop in Rawhiti Street and further expanded back into part of its Commerce Street store in 2018.

== Hotels ==
Four hotels once stood near the railway station. Two were to the west in Colombo Street and two on the other side of the line on High St.

=== Frankton Hotel ===
Frankton Hotel remains on the corner of Commerce and High Streets. It was built in 1929 as a 35-room hotel to a design by Jack Chitty and is listed as a category 2 historic place. An earlier hotel was moved about 75 ft (23 m) by horses to make way for the current building. During the move, the bar was in a temporary shed.

=== Empire Hotel ===
The New Empire Hotel was on the corner of Empire and High Streets. It was renovated in 1974, the original Empire Hotel having been built in February 1913. In 1995 it was burnt down by an arsonist, killing six residents. In 1946 the Grand Hotel on Colombo St had also burnt down.

== Industry ==
Frankton has long been one of Hamilton's industrial centres. In addition to the Railway House Factory, another major employer was a factory on a 3.4 ha (8.4 acres) site, beside the railway, on the corner of Massey and Lincoln streets, specializing in brawn, sausages and polonies from 1901 to 2014. Pigs were slaughtered there from 1911 to 1999. It had a railway siding from 1912 until the 1990s. The factory had several owners, including Waikato Farmers' Bacon Co, W.Dimock & Co Ltd and J.C.Hutton Australia from 1926 to 1986. Hutton's then merged with Kiwi Bacon Co to become Hutton's Kiwi. In 2007 Goodman Fielder were warned for misleading labels, as some of its pork was imported. In 2014 they sold their meat brands to Hellers and 125 staff lost their jobs.

Frankton had dairy factories from 1894 and still has a cool store in the former dairy and bacon factories.

== Parks ==
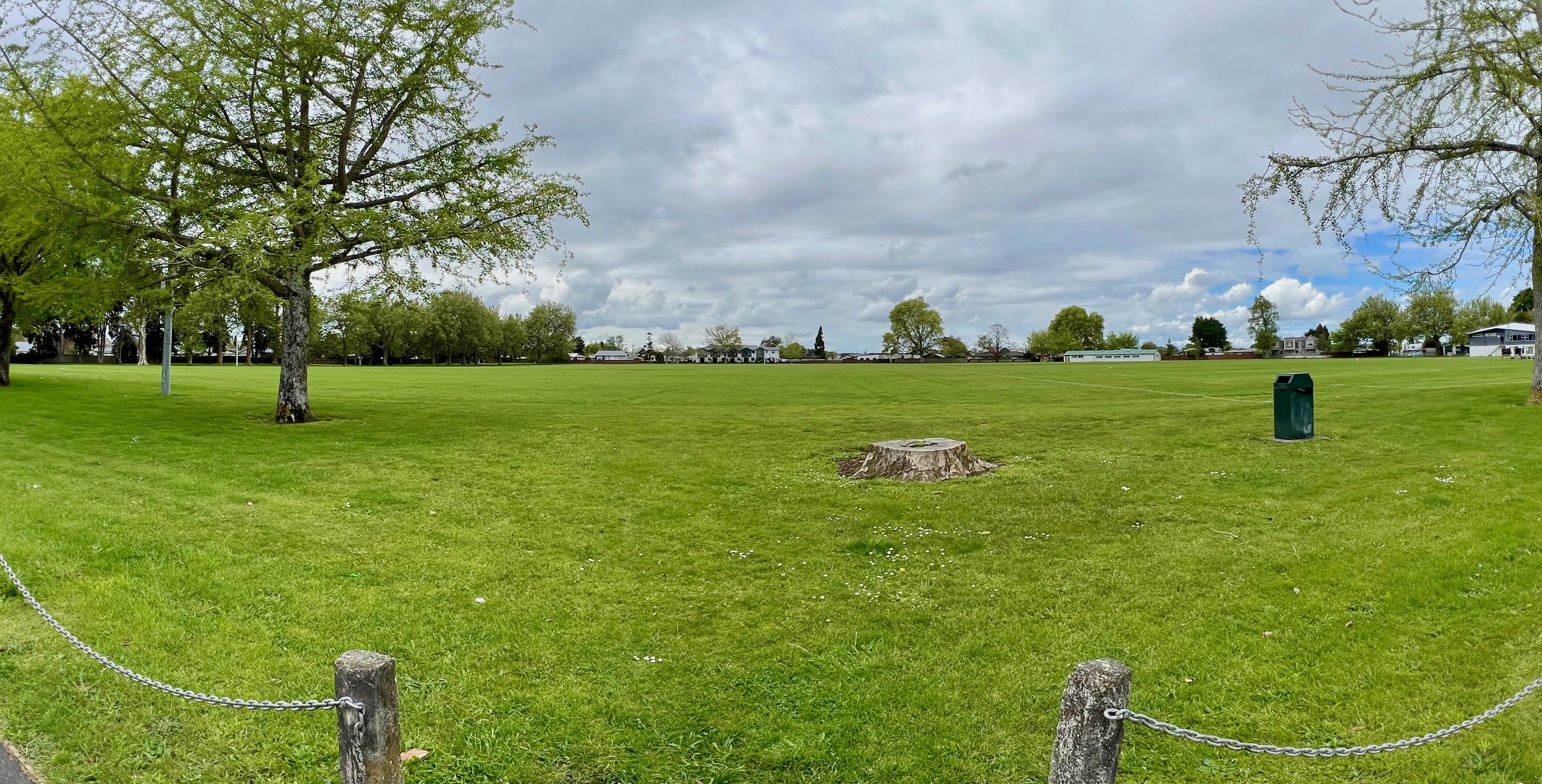
Swarbrick Park

Swarbrick Park was formed when 17 acres (6.9 ha) were acquired from Frankton School in 1936. It was formerly the Rifle Range Reserve and has 5 sports fields, used by Frankton Rugby Club, and 3 astroturf cricket pitches.

Frankton Railway Combined Sports Club, in the railway model village, was built in 1923, with bowling, cricket, croquet and tennis grounds. It was formally opened in 1925.

== V8 Supercars ==
The New Zealand leg of the Australian V8 Supercars centred on Hamilton Street Circuit in and around Frankton, yearly from April 2008 to 2012.

== Tornado ==
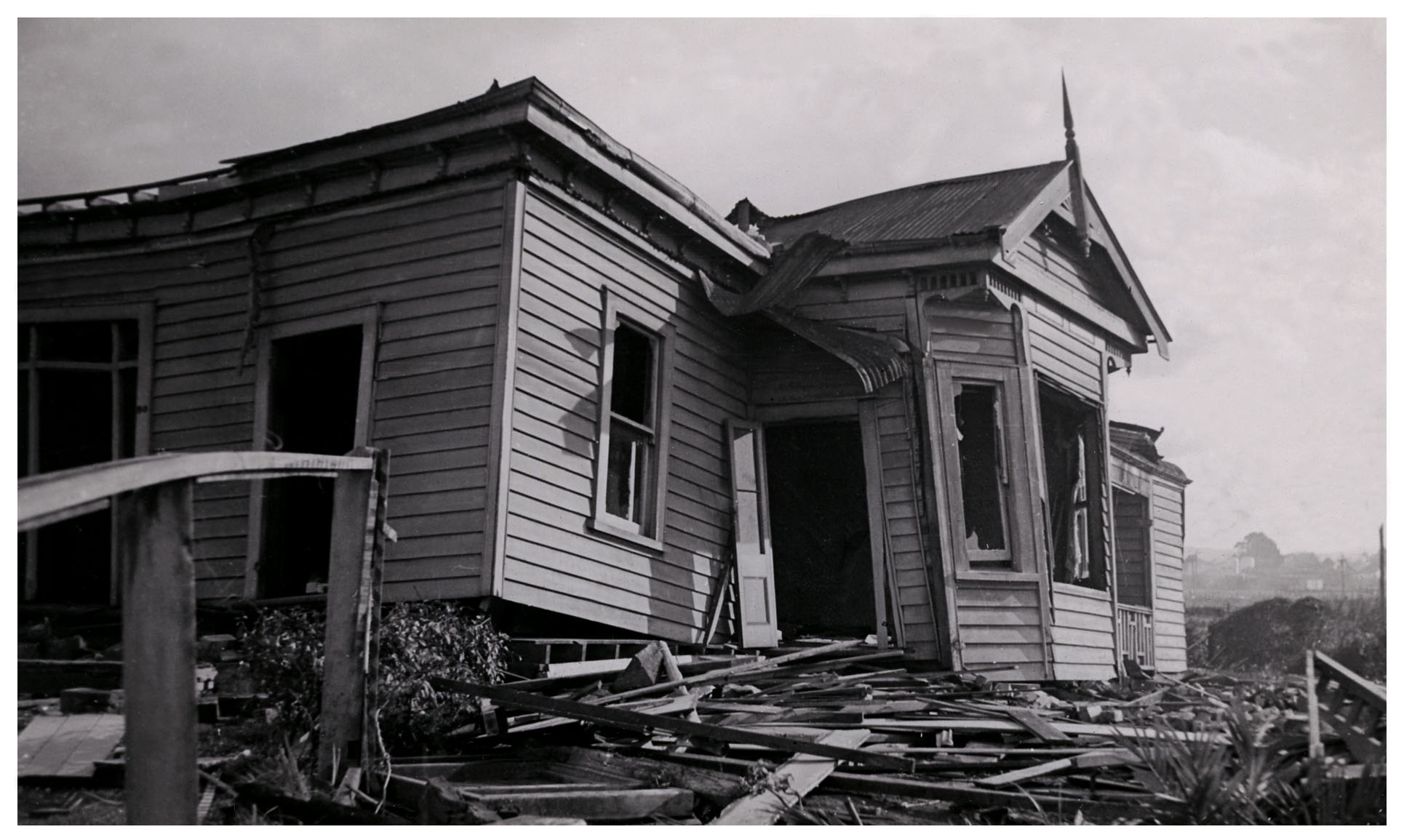
Frankton Tornado, August 1948

Three people were killed, seven victims were badly injured and damage to property was heavy after a tornado swept across Hamilton from the north-west shortly before midday on Wednesday 25 August 1948.

The tornado, which appears to have originated in the Frankton or Forest Lake area, went through the business area of Frankton then over the hill into Hamilton West where it passed between Hamilton Lake and Victoria Street (the main street). Then, it travelled across the Waikato River to Hamilton East where damage occurred in Wellington, Naylor and Grey streets.

Buildings were lifted off their piles, chimneys were snapped off, houses were unroofed, trees uprooted, and power and telephone lines were left hanging in the streets. The air was filled with flying corrugated iron, branches of trees, timber and other debris. Heavy rain accompanied the storm and overhead lightning flashed and thunder boomed. The storm passed quickly and was succeeded by a strange calm.

== Education ==
Rhode Street School is a full primary school for years 1 to 8 with a roll of 212 students. It was established in 1959.

Frankton School is a contributing primary school for years 1 to 6 with a roll of 709 students. Frankton School opened in 1911

Both schools are coeducational. Rolls are as of July 2026.

== See also ==
- List of streets in Hamilton
- Suburbs of Hamilton, New Zealand
- Photo of Frankton Junction Station, early 1890s
- St Columbas Catholic School, Hamilton, New Zealand
