= Thornton, New Zealand =

Thornton, New Zealand may refer to:

- Thornton, Bay of Plenty, settlement in the Bay of Plenty
- Thornton, Hamilton, suburb of Hamilton City

== See also ==
- Thorndon, New Zealand, suburb of Wellington
