= Western Heights, New Zealand =

Western heights is the name of three places in New Zealand:

- Western Heights, a suburb of Auckland
- Western Heights, a suburb of Hamilton
- Western Heights, a suburb of Rotorua
