= Crawshaw, New Zealand =

Suburb of Hamilton, New Zealand

Crawshaw
- Suburb
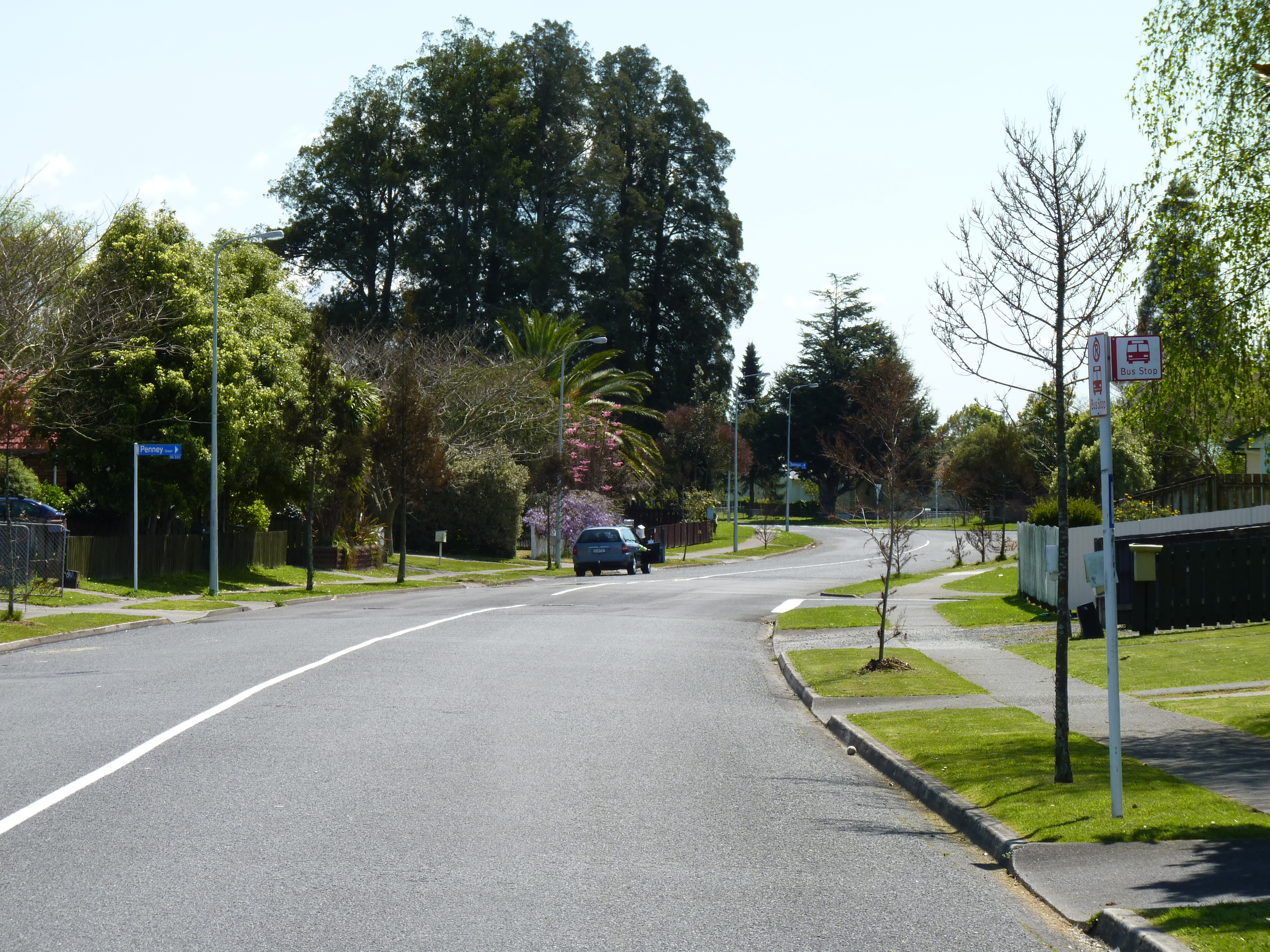
- A neighbourhood in Crawshaw, Hamilton.
- Interactive map of Crawshaw
- Coordinates: 37°46′19.95″S 175°14′0.68″E
- Country: New Zealand
- City: Hamilton, New Zealand
- Local authority: Hamilton City Council
- Electoral ward: West Ward

Area
  - Land: 86 ha (210 acres)

Population (June 2025)
  - Total: 3,560
  - Density: 4,100/km^{2} (11,000/sq mi)

Burbush	Te Rapa
Rotokauri	Crawshaw	Forest Lake
	Nawton

Crawshaw is a compact suburb, close to Te Rapa railway depot, in western Hamilton in New Zealand, and extended in the 2018 census to cover 0.86 km^{2} (210 acres). Although sometimes referred to as a suburb in its own right, it is often described as being part of Nawton.

The southern part of the suburb was developed about 1913, but the northern in the 1960s and 1970s. Housing New Zealand properties, tenanted by low income families have been reported to make up a majority of homes.

Crawshaw Park was created between 1979 and 1985. It covers 3.1 ha (7.7 acres), includes some remnant kahikateas and forms a link in a green chain through Mooney Park, Bishops Lane Reserve, Crawshaw Park and Dominion Park.

== Demographics ==
Crawshaw covers 0.86 km^{2} (0.33 sq mi) and had an estimated population of 3,560 as of June 2025, with a population density of 4,140 people per km^{2}.

Historical population
Year	Pop.	±% p.a.
2006	2,892	—
2013	2,889	−0.01%
2018	3,249	+2.38%
2023	3,261	+0.07%

Crawshaw had a population of 3,261 in the 2023 New Zealand census, an increase of 12 people (0.4%) since the 2018 census, and an increase of 372 people (12.9%) since the 2013 census. There were 1,626 males, 1,626 females and 9 people of other genders in 1,008 dwellings. 3.5% of people identified as LGBTIQ+. The median age was 29.2 years (compared with 38.1 years nationally). There were 888 people (27.2%) aged under 15 years, 795 (24.4%) aged 15 to 29, 1,332 (40.8%) aged 30 to 64, and 243 (7.5%) aged 65 or older.

People could identify as more than one ethnicity. The results were 49.3% European (Pākehā); 49.6% Māori; 12.9% Pasifika; 11.6% Asian; 2.6% Middle Eastern, Latin American and African New Zealanders (MELAA); and 1.1% other, which includes people giving their ethnicity as "New Zealander". English was spoken by 94.6%, Māori language by 13.9%, Samoan by 1.2%, and other languages by 11.3%. No language could be spoken by 3.1% (e.g. too young to talk). New Zealand Sign Language was known by 1.0%. The percentage of people born overseas was 16.3, compared with 28.8% nationally.

Religious affiliations were 24.2% Christian, 2.8% Hindu, 1.6% Islam, 4.1% Māori religious beliefs, 0.9% Buddhist, 0.5% New Age, 0.1% Jewish, and 2.2% other religions. People who answered that they had no religion were 55.8%, and 7.9% of people did not answer the census question.

Of those at least 15 years old, 297 (12.5%) people had a bachelor's or higher degree, 1,317 (55.5%) had a post-high school certificate or diploma, and 759 (32.0%) people exclusively held high school qualifications. The median income was $37,500, compared with $41,500 nationally. 81 people (3.4%) earned over $100,000 compared to 12.1% nationally. The employment status of those at least 15 was that 1,206 (50.8%) people were employed full-time, 258 (10.9%) were part-time, and 153 (6.4%) were unemployed.

Crawshaw census area had a block of about 25 houses from Nawton East added in 2018. The population increased by about a quarter from 1996 to 2018. They are poorer and younger than the 37.4 years of the national average, with more than double Hamilton's Māori average of 23.7%. The table below uses the older, slightly smaller census area for the older figures.-

Year	Population	Average age	Households	Median income	National median income
1996	2,541		780		
2001	2,874	24.7	897	$16,100	$18,500
2006	2,838	25.3	912	$21,900	$24,100
2013	2,796 (2,889)	26.1	906	$22,600	$27,900
2018	3,249	26.9	963	$23,800	$31,800
2023	3,261	26.2	1,008	$37,500	$41,500

== Education ==
Crawshaw School is a coeducational state primary school for years 1 to 8, with a roll of 278 as of March 2026. The school opened in 1988.

== See also ==
- Suburbs of Hamilton, New Zealand
