= Forest Lake, New Zealand =

Suburb of Hamilton, New Zealand

Forest Lake
- Suburb
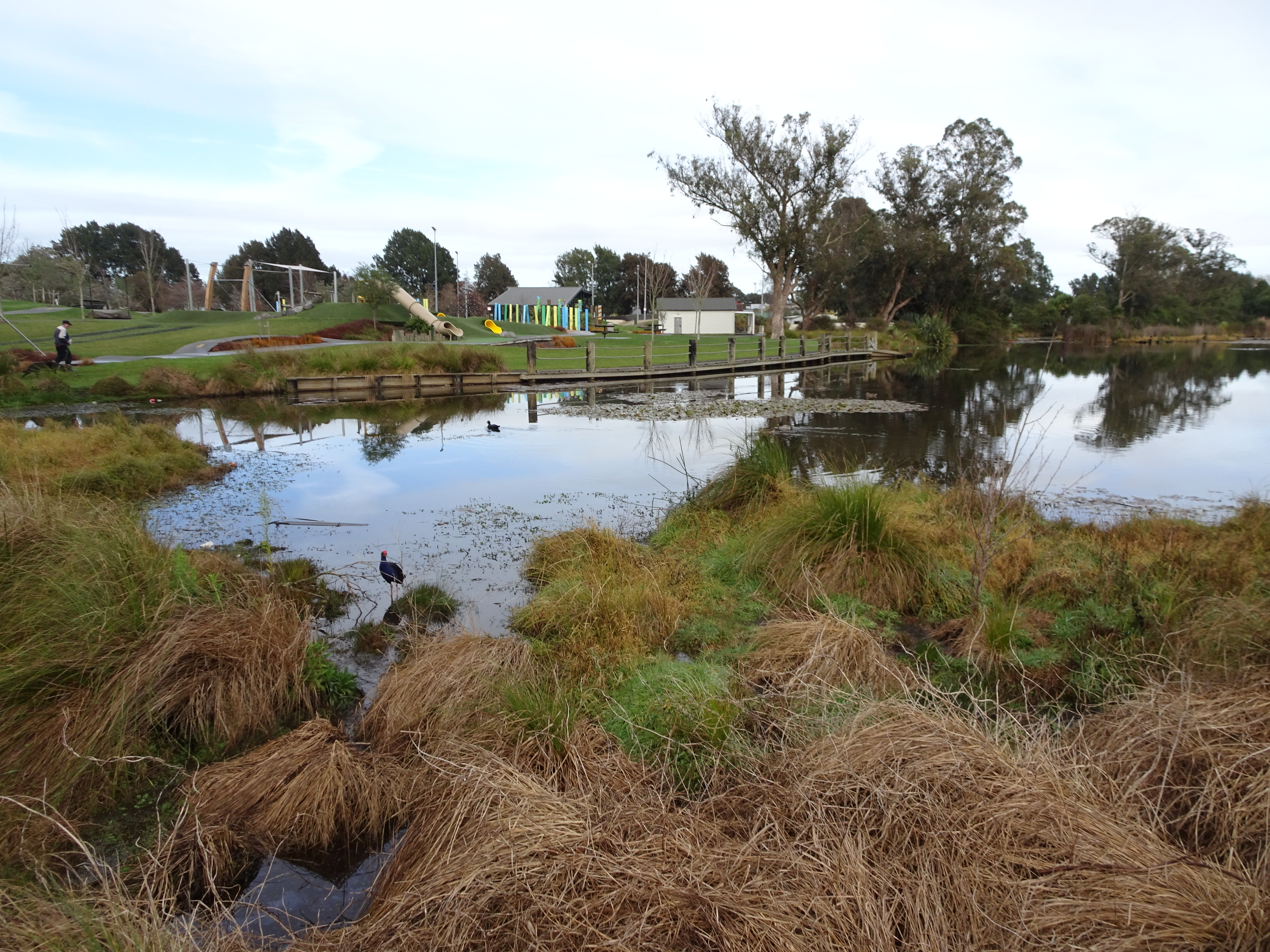
- Lake Rotokaeo and Minogue Park playground in 2017
- Interactive map of Forest Lake
- Coordinates: 37°46′26.42″S 175°15′20.86″E
- Country: New Zealand
- City: Hamilton, New Zealand
- Local authority: Hamilton City Council
- Electoral ward: West Ward
- Established: 1914

Area
  - Land: 123 ha (300 acres)

Population (June 2025)
  - Total: 2,780
  - Density: 2,260/km^{2} (5,850/sq mi)

Te Rapa	St Andrews
Rotokauri	Forest Lake	Beerescourt
Nawton	Maeroa	Whitiora

Forest Lake is a suburb of Hamilton in New Zealand and was added to from around the 1930s. It is centred around Forest Lake Road, which is used by around 10,000 vehicles a day.

For quite a long time there was swamp in a large part and this has now been drained but Lake Rotokaeo remains and the ground remains quite damp in parts.

Forest Lake is named after the forest that once surrounded Rotokaeo.

== History ==
Until the 1863 invasion of the Waikato, the area lay between the pās of Mangaharakeke and Kirikiriroa on the lands of Ngāti Wairere.

After confiscation, farms were established on 200 ha (490 acres) from Lake Rotoroa to Forest Lake Rd, owned by Thomas Jolly, and 162 ha (400 acres), to the north, owned by John Carey, a doctor with the 4th Waikato Regiment.

The first housing was the Laurenson Settlement, on Forest Lake Road, near Walsh Street, built for workers between 1914 and 1921, under the Workers Dwellings Act 1910. The 1927 Hamilton map showed that most of Forest Lake had by then been built on an area north of Waitawhiriwhiri Stream in what had been Pukete Parish when the 1913 map was drawn.

== Demographics ==
Forest Lake covers 1.23 km^{2} (0.47 sq mi) and had an estimated population of 2,780 as of June 2025, with a population density of 2,260 people per km^{2}.

Historical population
Year	Pop.	±% p.a.
2006	2,130	—
2013	2,289	+1.03%
2018	2,487	+1.67%
2023	2,622	+1.06%

Forest Lake had a population of 2,622 in the 2023 New Zealand census, an increase of 135 people (5.4%) since the 2018 census, and an increase of 333 people (14.5%) since the 2013 census. There were 1,233 males, 1,377 females and 12 people of other genders in 1,071 dwellings. 3.4% of people identified as LGBTIQ+. The median age was 34.8 years (compared with 38.1 years nationally). There were 537 people (20.5%) aged under 15 years, 543 (20.7%) aged 15 to 29, 1,056 (40.3%) aged 30 to 64, and 486 (18.5%) aged 65 or older.

People could identify as more than one ethnicity. The results were 67.7% European (Pākehā); 27.1% Māori; 5.8% Pasifika; 15.3% Asian; 1.6% Middle Eastern, Latin American and African New Zealanders (MELAA); and 2.4% other, which includes people giving their ethnicity as "New Zealander". English was spoken by 94.7%, Māori language by 7.1%, Samoan by 0.5%, and other languages by 13.0%. No language could be spoken by 2.7% (e.g. too young to talk). New Zealand Sign Language was known by 0.8%. The percentage of people born overseas was 21.7, compared with 28.8% nationally.

Religious affiliations were 32.7% Christian, 3.4% Hindu, 1.1% Islam, 1.6% Māori religious beliefs, 1.0% Buddhist, 0.7% New Age, and 2.9% other religions. People who answered that they had no religion were 50.0%, and 6.6% of people did not answer the census question.

Of those at least 15 years old, 483 (23.2%) people had a bachelor's or higher degree, 1,047 (50.2%) had a post-high school certificate or diploma, and 543 (26.0%) people exclusively held high school qualifications. The median income was $39,500, compared with $41,500 nationally. 168 people (8.1%) earned over $100,000 compared to 12.1% nationally. The employment status of those at least 15 was that 1,068 (51.2%) people were employed full-time, 222 (10.6%) were part-time, and 54 (2.6%) were unemployed.

== Education ==
Forest Lake School is a coeducational state primary school for years 1 to 6, with a roll of 368 as of July 2026. The school opened in 1926.

== Minogue Park ==
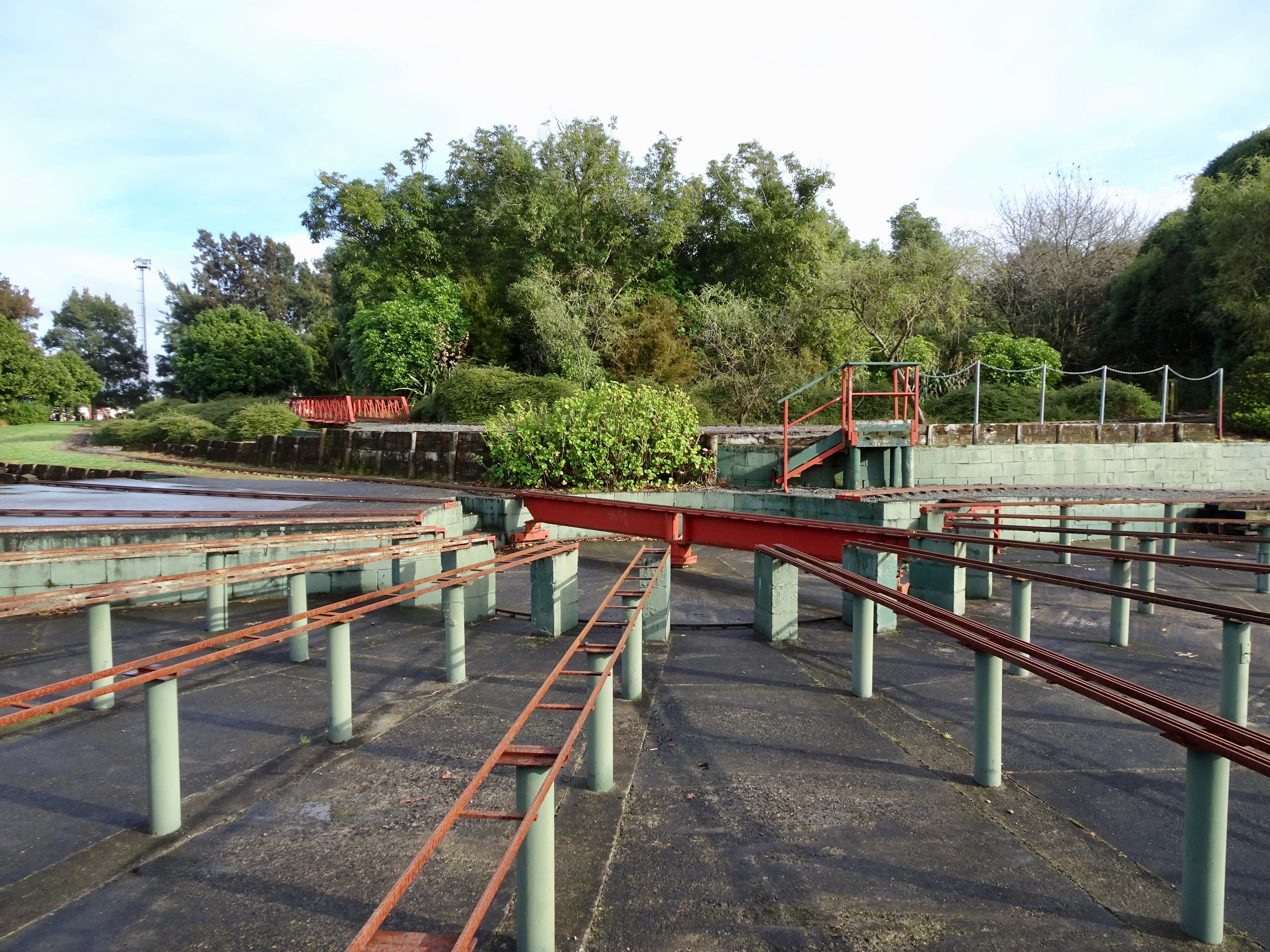
Model Engineers' turntable and stabling tracks

Minogue Park was first bought by Hamilton City Council in 1959, then extended in 1964, 1973 (Waterworld, dog exercise area, luge track and Hamilton Model Engineers Club), 1975 Rotokaeo Lake, 1979 (netball courts, BMX track and car park, and end of Walsh Street, 1992 NZR land west of Rotokaeo and in 2008. In September 1979 it was named after a former Mayor, Mike Minogue. In 2004 it was classified as a reserve under the Reserves Act (1977). There was a speedway until 1979, now this has been replaced by Minogue Park netball courts, a destination playground and a BMX track. The Model Engineers Club moved to the park in 1983 and now has 1.6 km (0.99 mi) of miniature railway track, a 1953 diesel shunter and the former Frankton signalbox. The playground was modernised in 2015. A cycleway is planned to link the playground with Nawton.

=== Rotokaeo Lake ===
The Māori language-name Rotokaeo translates as Lake (roto) of freshwater mussels (kāeo). It also provided other food, such as koura, kokopu and tuna (eels), and plants such as raupō, mangemange and flax. Electro-fishing in 2009 found catfish, goldfish and mosquitofish, as well as eels.

The lake is supertrophic, sometimes resulting in algal blooms. An outlet weir keeps water at a maximum depth of 1.8 m (5 ft 11 in). The catchment is about 11 ha (27 acres), mainly stormwater from neighbouring streets. Rotokaeo now covers 3.1 ha (7.7 acres), but once extended south into the area of the netball courts and BMX track, which was filled in for a rugby ground and then a stock car track. Before urbanisation the lake probably also had a larger area of peat bog.

Before 2007 Mexican water lilies covered 86% of the lake, attracting many wading birds, but, after weed control, a 2008 survey found mallard, pūkeko, coot, black shag, little black shag, little shag, black swan, Canada goose, Japanese snipe and dabchick.

There is little submerged vegetation but kahikatea bush has been planted to the north and west, with baumea, kawakawa, mahoe, manuka, swamp millet and Hypolepsis distans, whekī, mata, turutu and silver ferns. The rest of the lake is surrounded by Carex virgata, kuta and makura sedges, Myriophyllum propinquum, pohuehue, flax, dwarf bog rush and swamp coprosma. Weeds remaining include alder, arum lily, crack willow, grey willow, gorse, Mercer grass, pampas, reed sweet grass, yellow flag iris, parrot's feather and Japanese honeysuckle.

== See also ==
- List of streets in Hamilton
- Suburbs of Hamilton, New Zealand
