= Frank Jolly =

New Zealand politician and farmer (1865–1943)

Francis Bertrand Jolly (26 January 1865 – 18 February 1943) was a New Zealand farmer and local politician. He was born in London, Canada West on 26 January 1865. The Hamilton suburb of Frankton was named for him.
