= Western Heights, Hamilton =

Suburb of Hamilton, New Zealand

Western Heights
- Suburb
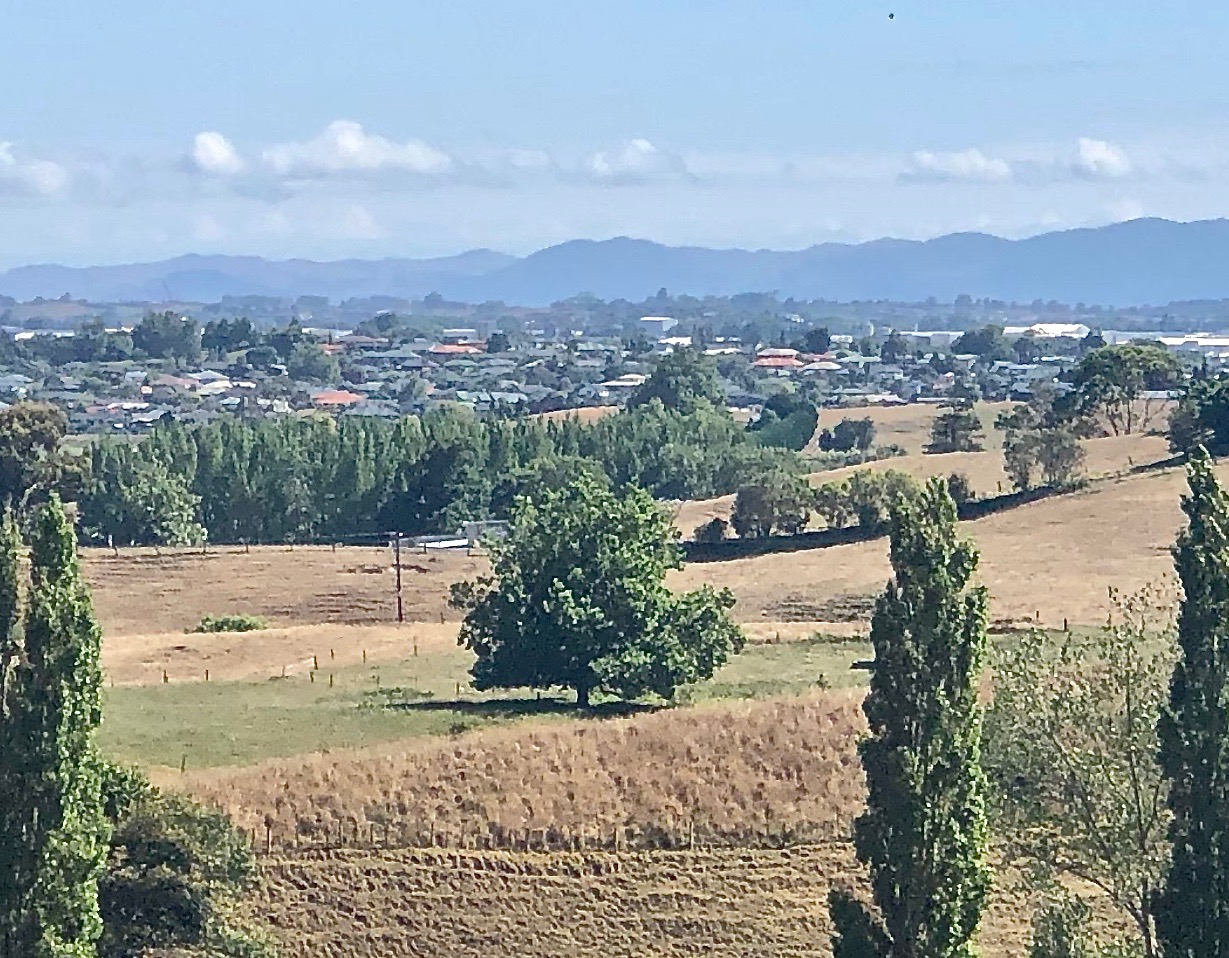
- Western Heights viewed from Wallace Road, looking north
- Interactive map of Western Heights
- Country: New Zealand
- City: Hamilton, New Zealand
- Local authority: Hamilton City Council
- Electoral ward: West Ward
- Established: 1998

Area
  - Land: 107 ha (260 acres)

Population (June 2025)
  - Total: 3,190
  - Density: 2,980/km^{2} (7,720/sq mi)

Grandview Heights	Rotokauri	Crawshaw
Whatawhata	Western Heights	Nawton
Stonebridge	Temple View	Dinsdale

Western Heights is a suburb on the western boundary of the city of Hamilton in the Waikato region of the North Island of New Zealand.

Skyline landmarks include Dinsdale water reservoir, the adjacent Newcastle reservoir, one of the largest in the city holding 21,000 m^{3} (740,000 cu ft), and a block of gum trees. As these mature many have had to be culled. Google Earth maps highlight the area as the most clearly defined block to Hamilton's west. Situated as it is to the west of the ridge on the city's boundary, the suburb is a little exposed to wind but the views are good.

Hamilton Boundary Road was renamed Brymer Road by Waipa County Council in 1967, after Mr Brymer, a local property owner. In 2007 $865,000 was spent widening it to become the main road through Western Heights. In 2018 it was used by 3,600 vehicles a day, 60 of them buses on the half hourly route 3. See also - List of streets in Hamilton.

== Demographics ==
In the 2018 census the new area of Western Heights (Hamilton City) was created from parts of Brymer, Norton and Dinsdale North. It includes the area marked as Grandview Heights on the 1:50,000 map.

Western Heights covers 1.07 km^{2} (0.41 sq mi) and had an estimated population of 3,190 as of June 2025, with a population density of 2,981 people per km^{2}.

Historical population
Year	Pop.	±% p.a.
2006	2,241	—
2013	2,541	+1.81%
2018	2,913	+2.77%
2023	3,018	+0.71%

Western Heights had a population of 3,018 in the 2023 New Zealand census, an increase of 105 people (3.6%) since the 2018 census, and an increase of 477 people (18.8%) since the 2013 census. There were 1,458 males, 1,542 females and 18 people of other genders in 993 dwellings. 2.7% of people identified as LGBTIQ+. The median age was 39.0 years (compared with 38.1 years nationally). There were 585 people (19.4%) aged under 15 years, 579 (19.2%) aged 15 to 29, 1,368 (45.3%) aged 30 to 64, and 480 (15.9%) aged 65 or older.

People could identify as more than one ethnicity. The results were 66.2% European (Pākehā); 22.8% Māori; 6.2% Pasifika; 20.5% Asian; 2.9% Middle Eastern, Latin American and African New Zealanders (MELAA); and 1.8% other, which includes people giving their ethnicity as "New Zealander". English was spoken by 94.8%, Māori language by 5.1%, Samoan by 0.6%, and other languages by 19.6%. No language could be spoken by 1.9% (e.g. too young to talk). New Zealand Sign Language was known by 0.5%. The percentage of people born overseas was 25.4, compared with 28.8% nationally.

Religious affiliations were 33.2% Christian, 5.8% Hindu, 1.9% Islam, 1.1% Māori religious beliefs, 1.2% Buddhist, 0.4% New Age, and 4.4% other religions. People who answered that they had no religion were 45.7%, and 6.6% of people did not answer the census question.

Of those at least 15 years old, 606 (24.9%) people had a bachelor's or higher degree, 1,272 (52.3%) had a post-high school certificate or diploma, and 555 (22.8%) people exclusively held high school qualifications. The median income was $49,900, compared with $41,500 nationally. 342 people (14.1%) earned over $100,000 compared to 12.1% nationally. The employment status of those at least 15 was that 1,362 (56.0%) people were employed full-time, 321 (13.2%) were part-time, and 63 (2.6%) were unemployed.
