= Thornton, Hamilton =

Thornton
- Suburb
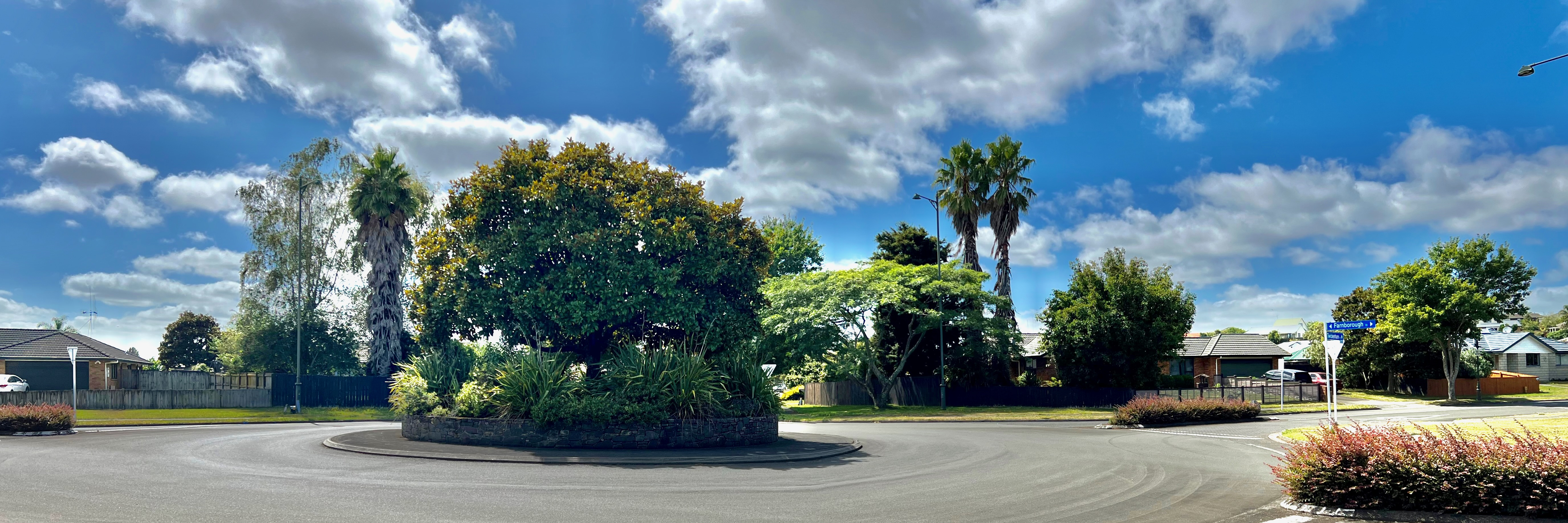
- Farnborough Drive roundabout, Thornton - the suburb is flat, single storey, with wide, tree-lined roads
- Interactive map of Thornton
- Coordinates: 37°46′40.58″S 175°13′22.36″E
- Country: New Zealand
- City: Hamilton, New Zealand
- Electoral ward: Hamilton West
- Established: 1997

Population (2006 Census)
  - Total: 2,286

| | Te Rapa |
| Rotokauri | Thornton | Crawshaw |
| | Nawton |

Thornton is a name sometimes used for part of a suburb in western Hamilton in New Zealand.

Aldershot Place, Arundel Place, Dorchester Place, Farnborough Drive, Hadrians Way, Highbury Place, Sandhurst Place, Twickenham Place, Wembley Close and Wimbledon Close were named in 1997 by Thornton Estates Ltd., the developer, using English place names. They are more usually described as being in Nawton and are in the Nawton West census area.

== See also ==
- Suburbs of Hamilton, New Zealand
