= Grandview Heights, New Zealand =

Grandview Heights
- Suburb
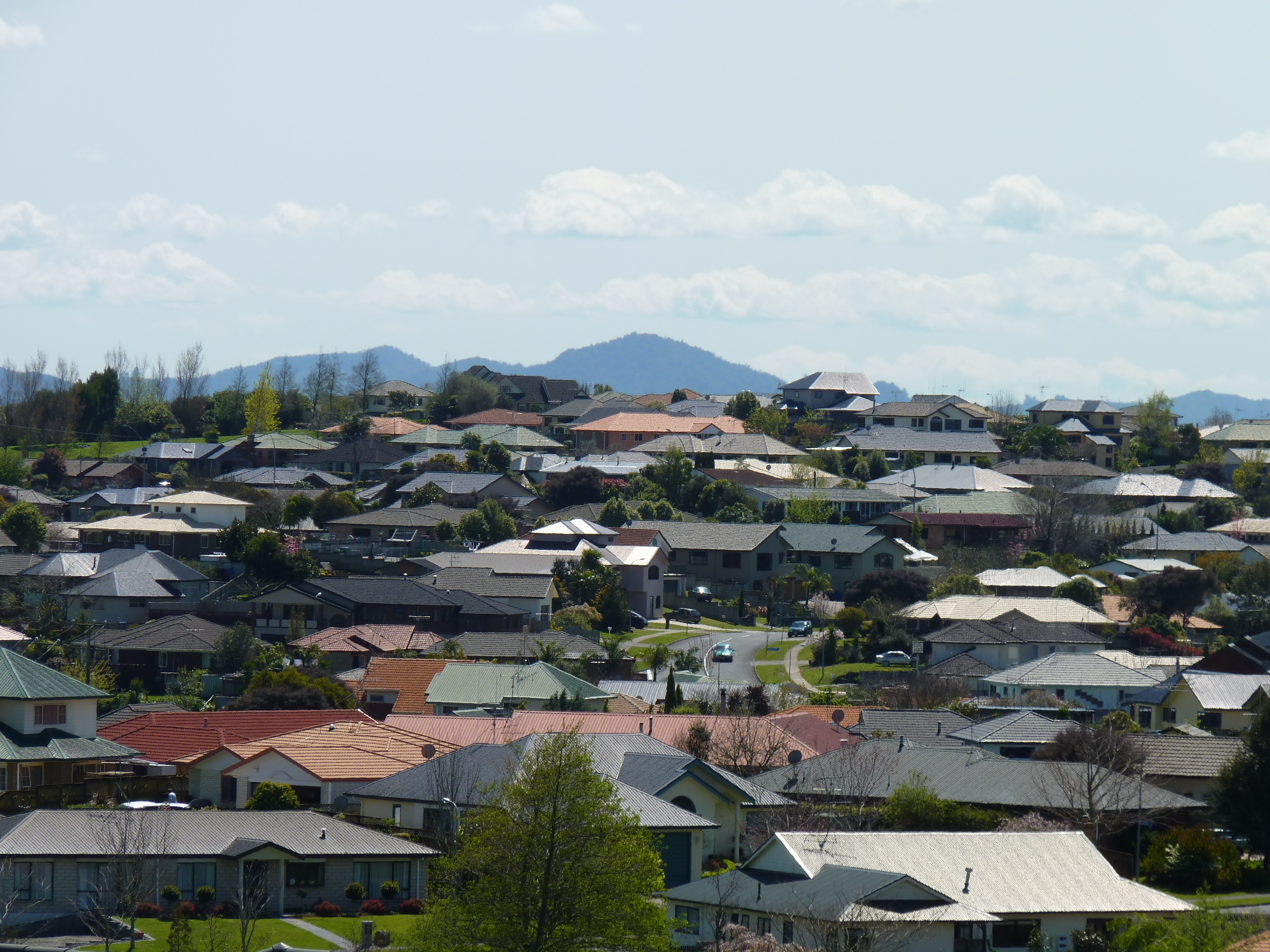
- Grandview Heights, Hamilton
- Interactive map of Grandview Heights
- Coordinates: 37.784°S 175.225°E
- Country: New Zealand
- City: Hamilton, New Zealand
- Electoral ward: Hamilton West

Area
  - Land: 35 ha (86 acres)

Population (2023 census)
  - Total: 948
  - Density: 2,700/km^{2} (7,000/sq mi)

Rotokauri	Burbush
	Grandview Heights	Nawton
Whatawhata	Temple View	Western Heights

Grandview Heights is a suburb in western Hamilton in New Zealand.

== Demographics ==
Grandview Heights covers 0.35 km^{2} (0.14 sq mi). It is included in the demographics for Western Heights statistical area.

Historical population
Year	Pop.	±% p.a.
2006	906	—
2013	879	−0.43%
2018	948	+1.52%
2023	948	+0.00%

Grandview Heights had a population of 948 in the 2023 New Zealand census, unchanged since the 2018 census, and an increase of 69 people (7.8%) since the 2013 census. There were 450 males, 489 females and 3 people of other genders in 306 dwellings. 1.9% of people identified as LGBTIQ+. There were 183 people (19.3%) aged under 15 years, 174 (18.4%) aged 15 to 29, 405 (42.7%) aged 30 to 64, and 189 (19.9%) aged 65 or older.

People could identify as more than one ethnicity. The results were 71.8% European (Pākehā); 29.1% Māori; 6.3% Pasifika; 15.2% Asian; 1.3% Middle Eastern, Latin American and African New Zealanders (MELAA); and 2.5% other, which includes people giving their ethnicity as "New Zealander". English was spoken by 94.3%, Māori language by 6.3%, Samoan by 0.6%, and other languages by 12.7%. No language could be spoken by 1.3% (e.g. too young to talk). New Zealand Sign Language was known by 0.3%. The percentage of people born overseas was 17.7, compared with 28.8% nationally.

Religious affiliations were 32.6% Christian, 1.6% Hindu, 1.9% Islam, 0.9% Māori religious beliefs, 1.3% Buddhist, 0.9% New Age, and 4.4% other religions. People who answered that they had no religion were 50.0%, and 6.6% of people did not answer the census question.

Of those at least 15 years old, 165 (21.6%) people had a bachelor's or higher degree, 417 (54.5%) had a post-high school certificate or diploma, and 174 (22.7%) people exclusively held high school qualifications. 102 people (13.3%) earned over $100,000 compared to 12.1% nationally. The employment status of those at least 15 was that 384 (50.2%) people were employed full-time, 99 (12.9%) were part-time, and 27 (3.5%) were unemployed.

=== Grandview ===
In the 2013 census, the Grandview area unit, which was east of Grandview Heights, had a population of 3,132, an increase of 147 people since the 2006 census. There were 1,467 males and 1,662 females. Figures have been rounded and may not add up to totals. 65.1% were European/Pākehā, 32.4% were Māori, 6.6% were Pacific peoples and 9.0% were Asian.

In the 2018 census the name disappeared and most of Grandview became part of Nawton East.

== See also ==
- List of streets in Hamilton
- Suburbs of Hamilton, New Zealand
