= Burbush =

Suburb of Hamilton, New Zealand

- Suburb
- Interactive map of Burbush
- Coordinates: 37.75°S 175.21°E
- Country: New Zealand
- City: Hamilton, New Zealand
- Electoral ward: West Ward

Area
  - Land: 710 ha (1,800 acres)

Population (June 2025)
  - Total: 1,170
  - Density: 160/km^{2} (430/sq mi)

Te Kowhai	Horotiu	Te Rapa
Rotokauri	Burbush	Pukete
Rotokauri	Grandview Heights	Nawton

Burbush is a semi-rural suburb in western Hamilton in New Zealand. It is one of the future urban zones of Hamilton, The southern part of Burbush includes Baverstock. Burbush was taken into Hamilton with the 10th city extension in November 1989. Until then it had been in the Waipa County Council area.

Prior to the 1863 invasion of the Waikato the area was occupied by Ngāti Koura, Ngāti Ruru and Ngāti Ngamurikaitaua, all being Tainui hapū.

== Demographics ==
The Burbush-Baverstock statistical area, which was called Rotokauri-Waiwhakareke in the 2018 census), covers 7.10 km^{2} (2.74 sq mi) and had an estimated population of 1,170 as of June 2025, with a population density of 165 people per km^{2}.

Historical population
Year	Pop.	±% p.a.
2006	375	—
2013	333	−1.68%
2018	546	+10.40%
2023	1,029	+13.51%

Burbush-Baverstock had a population of 1,029 in the 2023 New Zealand census, an increase of 483 people (88.5%) since the 2018 census, and an increase of 696 people (209.0%) since the 2013 census. There were 507 males, 519 females and 3 people of other genders in 327 dwellings. 2.9% of people identified as LGBTIQ+. The median age was 33.6 years (compared with 38.1 years nationally). There were 237 people (23.0%) aged under 15 years, 183 (17.8%) aged 15 to 29, 483 (46.9%) aged 30 to 64, and 123 (12.0%) aged 65 or older.

People could identify as more than one ethnicity. The results were 58.6% European (Pākehā); 21.6% Māori; 7.3% Pasifika; 27.4% Asian; 1.5% Middle Eastern, Latin American and African New Zealanders (MELAA); and 3.5% other, which includes people giving their ethnicity as "New Zealander". English was spoken by 93.6%, Māori language by 6.1%, Samoan by 0.6%, and other languages by 22.4%. No language could be spoken by 3.2% (e.g. too young to talk). The percentage of people born overseas was 32.4, compared with 28.8% nationally.

Religious affiliations were 31.2% Christian, 8.2% Hindu, 2.9% Islam, 0.9% Māori religious beliefs, 0.6% Buddhist, 0.3% New Age, 0.3% Jewish, and 6.7% other religions. People who answered that they had no religion were 43.7%, and 5.8% of people did not answer the census question.

Of those at least 15 years old, 243 (30.7%) people had a bachelor's or higher degree, 405 (51.1%) had a post-high school certificate or diploma, and 150 (18.9%) people exclusively held high school qualifications. The median income was $54,200, compared with $41,500 nationally. 99 people (12.5%) earned over $100,000 compared to 12.1% nationally. The employment status of those at least 15 was that 456 (57.6%) people were employed full-time, 96 (12.1%) were part-time, and 15 (1.9%) were unemployed.

== Lakes ==
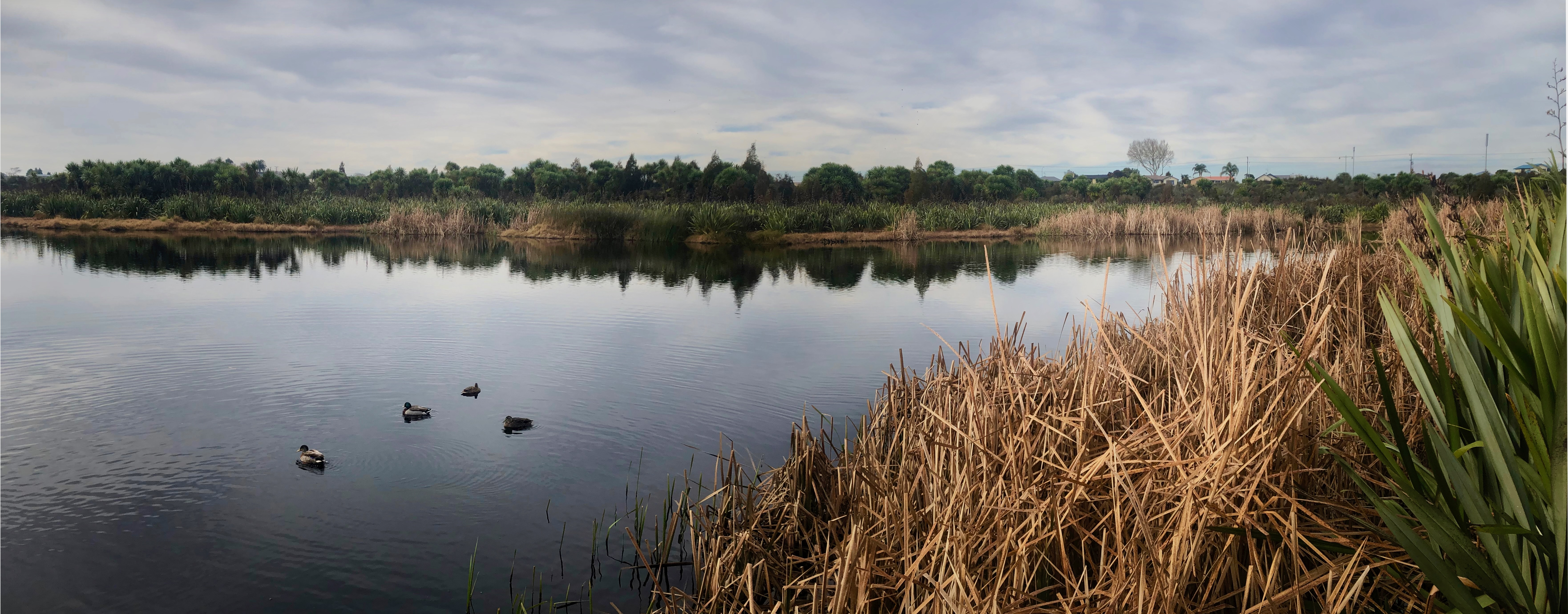
Waiwhakareke (Horseshoe) Lake

Waiwhakareke, or Horseshoe Lake (neither name is official) is a 3 ha (7.4 acres) peat lake in the 65.5 ha (162 acres) Waiwhakareke Natural Heritage Park, bought by Hamilton City Council in 1975. It is in the south west corner of Burbush. Like most of Waikato it would have been inundated by a flood of water and ignimbrite debris from Lake Taupō about 22,000 years ago, followed by further events, including the 232 CE ± 10 Hatepe eruption and flood. A peat bog formed in the hollow and restricted drainage. Work to restore the natural qualities of the park began in 2004. The lake drains north into a stream, which has been cut to Lake Rotokauri. Willows have been removed from around the lake, but the introduced species of catfish, rudd, brown trout and mosquito fish are common. In 2026 a pest-exclusion fence is being built around the Park.

== See also ==
- List of streets in Hamilton
- Suburbs of Hamilton, New Zealand
- Rotokauri Public Transport Hub
