= Whitiora =

Suburb of Hamilton, New Zealand

- Suburb
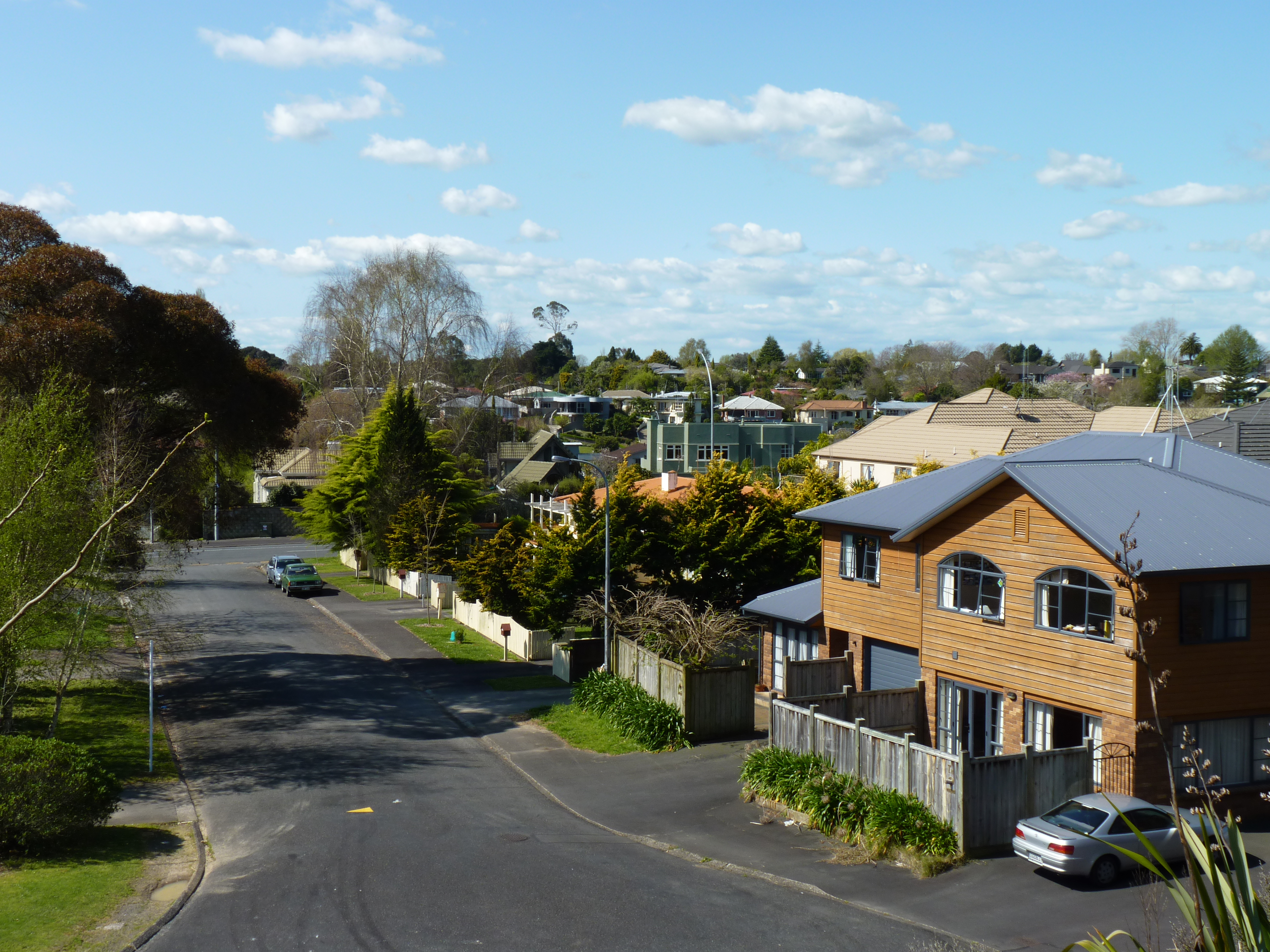
- Whitiora, Hamilton
- Interactive map of Whitiora
- Coordinates: 37°46′39″S 175°16′27.91″E
- Country: New Zealand
- City: Hamilton, New Zealand
- Local authority: Hamilton City Council
- Electoral ward: West Ward
- Established: 1913

Area
  - Land: 77 ha (190 acres)

Population (June 2025)
  - Total: 2,870
  - Density: 3,700/km^{2} (9,700/sq mi)

Forest Lake	Beerescourt	Fairfield
Maeroa	Whitiora	Claudelands
Frankton, Hamilton	Hamilton North	Hamilton East

Whitiora is a suburb in central Hamilton in New Zealand. The suburb is home to Waikato Stadium, formerly Rugby Park. It is a major sporting and cultural events venue in Hamilton with a total capacity of 25,800. The stadium is a multi-purpose facility, though used mainly for rugby union. Many of Hamilton's hotels are in Whitiora, along the main road from the north.

== Etymology ==
The name Whitiora was first used as the name of the Whitiora Bowling Club, officially opened in November 1908. The bowling green had originally been built the previous year on the Victoria Street property of Mr TJ Mitchell. He also suggested the club be named Whitiora, then defined as "properity".

The name Whitiora began to be used for the larger area from about 1913, when the new suburb was being developed. Prior to that it had been known as No.1, possibly because No. 1 Company of Militia was once based there.

Whitiora was said to translate as prosperity and plenty, though, in a 2019 leaflet and in naming the current Whitiora Bridge, it was said name was derived from the call of the pipiwharauroa, and 'ora', meaning life, or health.

The name may also be a reference to the esteemed Māori chief Whitiora (Wiremu te Komiti). His name was given to him after leading his men across the Waitara River in 1860. In this instance, Whitiora was said to mean "the safe crossing".

== History ==
=== Whatanoa Pā ===
Ngāti Te Ao, occupied Whatanoa Pā on what is now Beetham Park. Hotumauea of Ngāti Koura took the pā in the late 1600s. The remains of an urupā were exhumed in 1922, ditches show on a 1943 aerial photo and, when FMG Stadium was built in 2002, a waharoa (pā gateway) was placed to mark the site of the pā.

=== Post colonisation ===
The street layout was shown on an 1865 plan of the military settlement, just a year after the invasion of the Waikato and confiscation of the land. Ulster and Willoughby Streets were named in 1864, the latter after a colonial secretary, Willoughby Shortland.

Whitiora Lagoon, to the west of Abbotsford Street, was drained in 1915 and a 'frog pond' at about the same time, seemingly as part of a scheme to drain the whole area.

In the 1940s Snake Gully accommodation camp had airmen billeted in huts beside the Waitewhiriwhiri Stream, where the Badminton Club now stands. It was converted to an emergency housing camp in 1945.

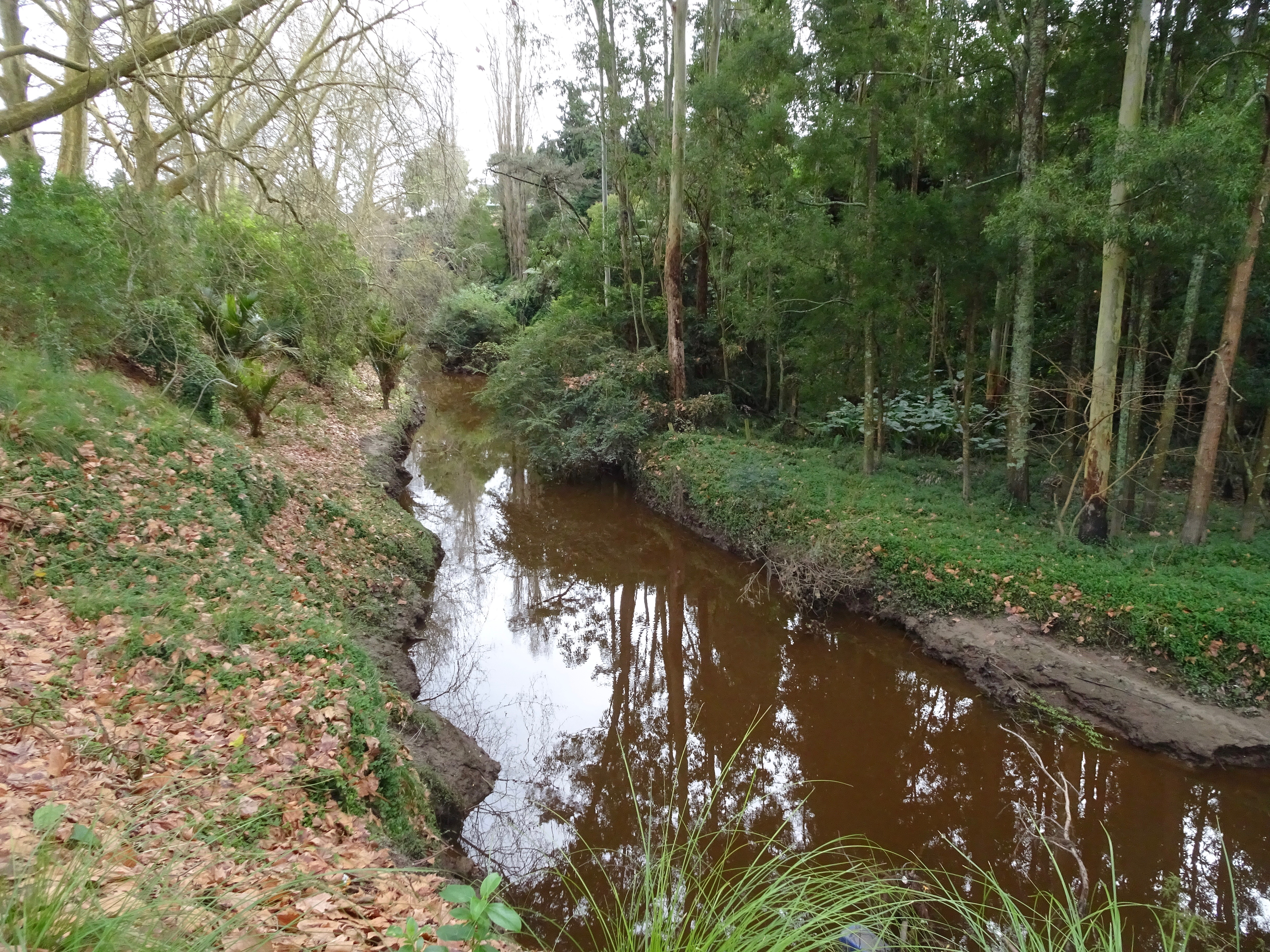
Waitawhiriwhiri Stream in Edgecumbe Park

== Geography ==
Whitiora lies on the west bank of the Waikato River, just to the south of its confluence with the Waitewhiriwhiri Stream. Pollution of the stream has long been a problem. In 1921 the stench was said to be getting abominable due to factory waste.

=== Hamilton Town Belt ===
A stretch of the Hamilton Town Belt runs through Whitiora, including Beetham, Edgecumbe and Willoughby Parks. It was planned as a continuous belt, but has gradually been eroded, beginning with the rugby ground in 1922, which had previously been covered in gorse. It has been calculated that only 56% remains as open green space.

== Demographics ==
Whitiora covers 0.77 km^{2} (0.30 sq mi) and has the Waitewhiriwhiri Stream as its northern and western boundary.

Whitiora had an estimated population of 2,870 as of June 2025, with a population density of 3,727 people per km^{2}.

Historical population
Year	Pop.	±% p.a.
2006	1,797	—
2013	1,827	+0.24%
2018	2,277	+4.50%
2023	2,592	+2.63%
The 2006 population is for a larger area of 0.91 km^{2}. Source:

Whitiora had a population of 2,592 in the 2023 New Zealand census, an increase of 315 people (13.8%) since the 2018 census, and an increase of 765 people (41.9%) since the 2013 census. There were 1,335 males, 1,245 females and 15 people of other genders in 1,383 dwellings. 5.2% of people identified as LGBTIQ+. The median age was 30.7 years (compared with 38.1 years nationally). There were 402 people (15.5%) aged under 15 years, 834 (32.2%) aged 15 to 29, 1,164 (44.9%) aged 30 to 64, and 195 (7.5%) aged 65 or older.

People could identify as more than one ethnicity. The results were 39.7% European (Pākehā); 30.9% Māori; 8.1% Pasifika; 32.5% Asian; 3.7% Middle Eastern, Latin American and African New Zealanders (MELAA); and 1.9% other, which includes people giving their ethnicity as "New Zealander". English was spoken by 92.0%, Māori language by 8.6%, Samoan by 0.7%, and other languages by 26.5%. No language could be spoken by 2.8% (e.g. too young to talk). New Zealand Sign Language was known by 0.6%. The percentage of people born overseas was 39.0, compared with 28.8% nationally.

Religious affiliations were 28.2% Christian, 10.1% Hindu, 4.5% Islam, 3.1% Māori religious beliefs, 1.2% Buddhist, 0.6% New Age, 0.1% Jewish, and 8.1% other religions. People who answered that they had no religion were 38.9%, and 5.7% of people did not answer the census question.

Of those at least 15 years old, 582 (26.6%) people had a bachelor's or higher degree, 1,020 (46.6%) had a post-high school certificate or diploma, and 585 (26.7%) people exclusively held high school qualifications. The median income was $43,100, compared with $41,500 nationally. 165 people (7.5%) earned over $100,000 compared to 12.1% nationally. The employment status of those at least 15 was that 1,200 (54.8%) people were employed full-time, 210 (9.6%) were part-time, and 150 (6.8%) were unemployed.

In 2013 and earlier it had been part of Hamilton Central area.

== Education ==
Whitiora school was founded in October 1919, though a Whitiora school was mentioned in 1916. It was built for 160, but Hamilton was growing so fast that 3 extra rooms had to be added before opening, as too many children wanted to attend. In 1920 it was extended to cater for another 200, but by 1923 it was again overcrowded.

The primary school is for years 1 to 8. The roll is 212 as of July 2026. 47% of the roll of 230 identify as Māori and 11% as of Pacific origin.

== Infrastructure ==
=== Roads ===
Whitiora was on the Great South Road, called Jersey Street until 1913, when the name Victoria Street was extended to it.

The surface of Victoria Street was improved in 1914, with gravel added in 1929 and asphalt being laid on roads and footpaths by 1935.

There was a proposal to divert the main road from Victoria Street in 1930, but it wasn't until the 1960s that Ulster Street was extended to absorb Gurnell Avenue and form a 4-lane main road, by putting Waitewhiriwhiri Stream in a culvert and filling the valley. A 2019 plan proposed to investigate restoring a link by putting a pedestrian and cycling tunnel parallel with the culvert. It remained part of SH1 until Avalon Drive opened in 1992.

=== Power ===
Gas pipes were extended into the suburb in 1921. An electric substation was built near No.1 Bridge in 1922.

=== Waste ===
From 1922 to 1973 Hamilton West rubbish dump occupied 5.4 ha (13 acres), bounded by Willoughby Street Cemetery, Waitawhiriwhiri Stream and Ulster Street. Provision was made to stop leachate reaching the stream and gas entering nearby properties, when the rugby training ground in Beetham Park was built in 2009.

=== Sewage ===
Until 1976 Waitawhirwhiri Stream was one of the locations for septic tanks, which were emptied into the stream.

== Notable people ==
- Rufus Rogers, Labour MP, attended Whitiora School
- Ray Shannon, butterfly collector, attended Whitiora School

== See also ==
- List of streets in Hamilton
- Suburbs of Hamilton, New Zealand
- Whitiora Bridge
