= Maeroa =

Suburb of Hamilton, New Zealand

- Suburb
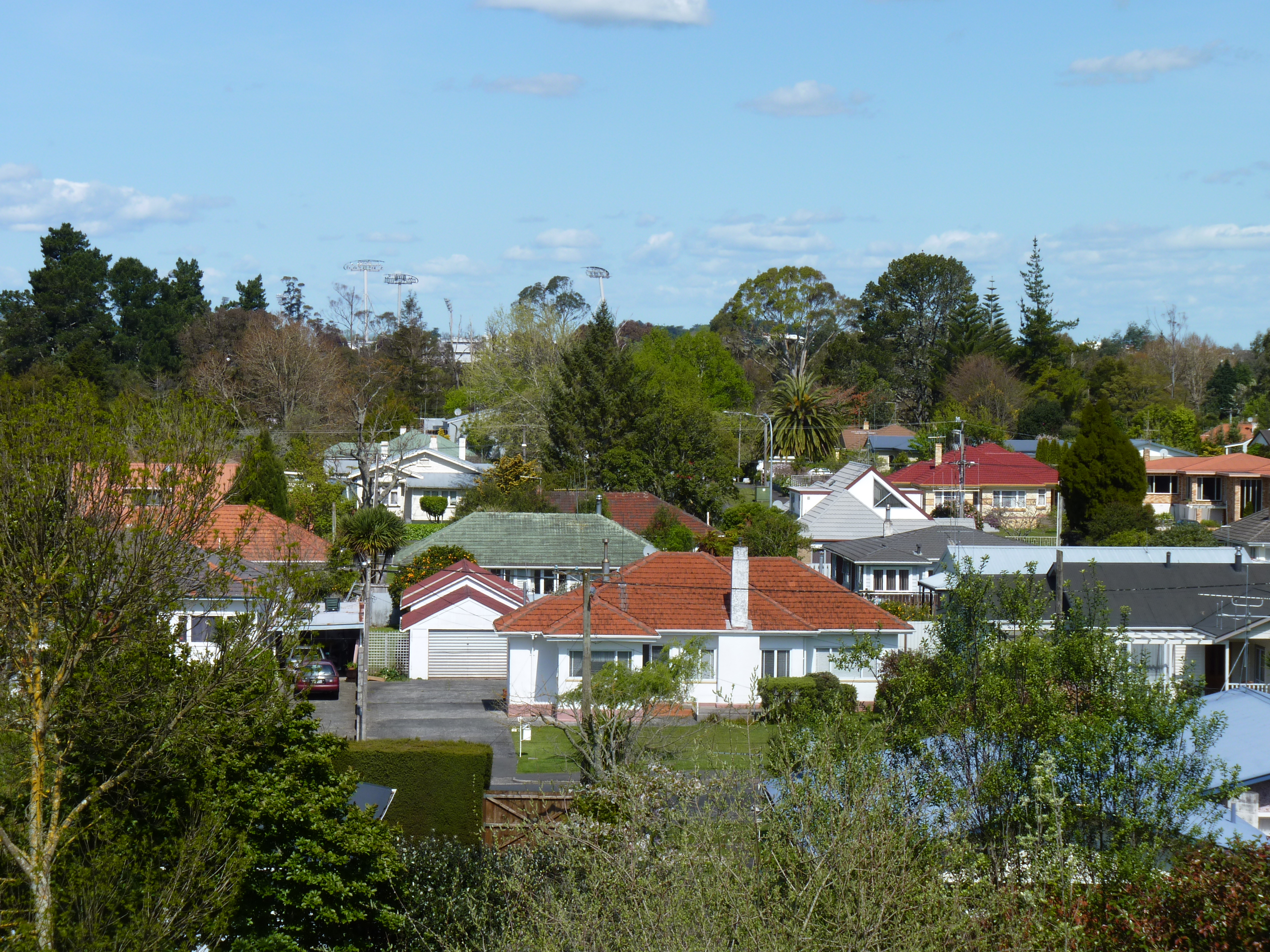
- Maeroa, Hamilton
- Interactive map of Maeroa
- Coordinates: 37°46′37.78″S 175°15′32.99″E
- Country: New Zealand
- City: Hamilton, New Zealand
- Local authority: Hamilton City Council
- Electoral ward: West Ward
- Established: 1925

Area
  - Land: 128 ha (320 acres)

Population (June 2025)
  - Total: 4,050
  - Density: 3,160/km^{2} (8,190/sq mi)

Te Rapa	Forest Lake	Beerescourt
Nawton	Maeroa	Whitiora
Dinsdale	Frankton	Hamilton Lake

Maeroa is a suburb in western Hamilton in New Zealand. Originally an outlying suburb, it became part of Hamilton City in 1925 with the second boundary extension.

== Demographics ==
Maeroa covers 1.28 km^{2} (0.49 sq mi) and had an estimated population of 4,050 as of June 2025, with a population density of 3,164 people per km^{2}.

Historical population
Year	Pop.	±% p.a.
2006	3,303	—
2013	3,336	+0.14%
2018	3,726	+2.24%
2023	3,789	+0.34%

Maeroa had a population of 3,789 in the 2023 New Zealand census, an increase of 63 people (1.7%) since the 2018 census, and an increase of 453 people (13.6%) since the 2013 census. There were 1,848 males, 1,920 females and 21 people of other genders in 1,428 dwellings. 5.1% of people identified as LGBTIQ+. The median age was 32.2 years (compared with 38.1 years nationally). There were 786 people (20.7%) aged under 15 years, 936 (24.7%) aged 15 to 29, 1,653 (43.6%) aged 30 to 64, and 411 (10.8%) aged 65 or older.

People could identify as more than one ethnicity. The results were 64.1% European (Pākehā); 31.7% Māori; 7.9% Pasifika; 12.9% Asian; 2.5% Middle Eastern, Latin American and African New Zealanders (MELAA); and 2.2% other, which includes people giving their ethnicity as "New Zealander". English was spoken by 94.8%, Māori language by 9.5%, Samoan by 0.9%, and other languages by 13.5%. No language could be spoken by 3.3% (e.g. too young to talk). New Zealand Sign Language was known by 0.7%. The percentage of people born overseas was 20.3, compared with 28.8% nationally.

Religious affiliations were 29.2% Christian, 3.2% Hindu, 2.7% Islam, 2.5% Māori religious beliefs, 0.4% Buddhist, 0.5% New Age, 0.1% Jewish, and 2.5% other religions. People who answered that they had no religion were 53.5%, and 5.7% of people did not answer the census question.

Of those at least 15 years old, 735 (24.5%) people had a bachelor's or higher degree, 1,527 (50.8%) had a post-high school certificate or diploma, and 738 (24.6%) people exclusively held high school qualifications. The median income was $43,900, compared with $41,500 nationally. 255 people (8.5%) earned over $100,000 compared to 12.1% nationally. The employment status of those at least 15 was that 1,671 (55.6%) people were employed full-time, 327 (10.9%) were part-time, and 138 (4.6%) were unemployed.

== Maeroa Intermediate School ==
The suburbs contains Maeroa Intermediate School, which became the first intermediate school in the Waikato region after being founded in 1954. The school coat of arms is registered with the College of Arms and includes arrows of desire, spear or sword of justice, lamp of knowledge and crosses. The bannerhead is also the school motto "I will not cease from mental fight", which is in line with the philosophy of a school that teaches children to think for themselves. Jerusalem is the school anthem.

The first principal of the school was Trevor Church. The school celebrated a 50th jubilee in 2004. That same year, the school hosted the Newscruise Challenge, an annual interschool news and general knowledge quiz sponsored by the Waikato Times. Footballer Marco Rojas is a notable alumni of the school.

The school roll was 688 students as of July 2025.

== See also ==
- List of streets in Hamilton
- Suburbs of Hamilton, New Zealand
