= Livingstone, Hamilton =

Livingstone
- Suburb
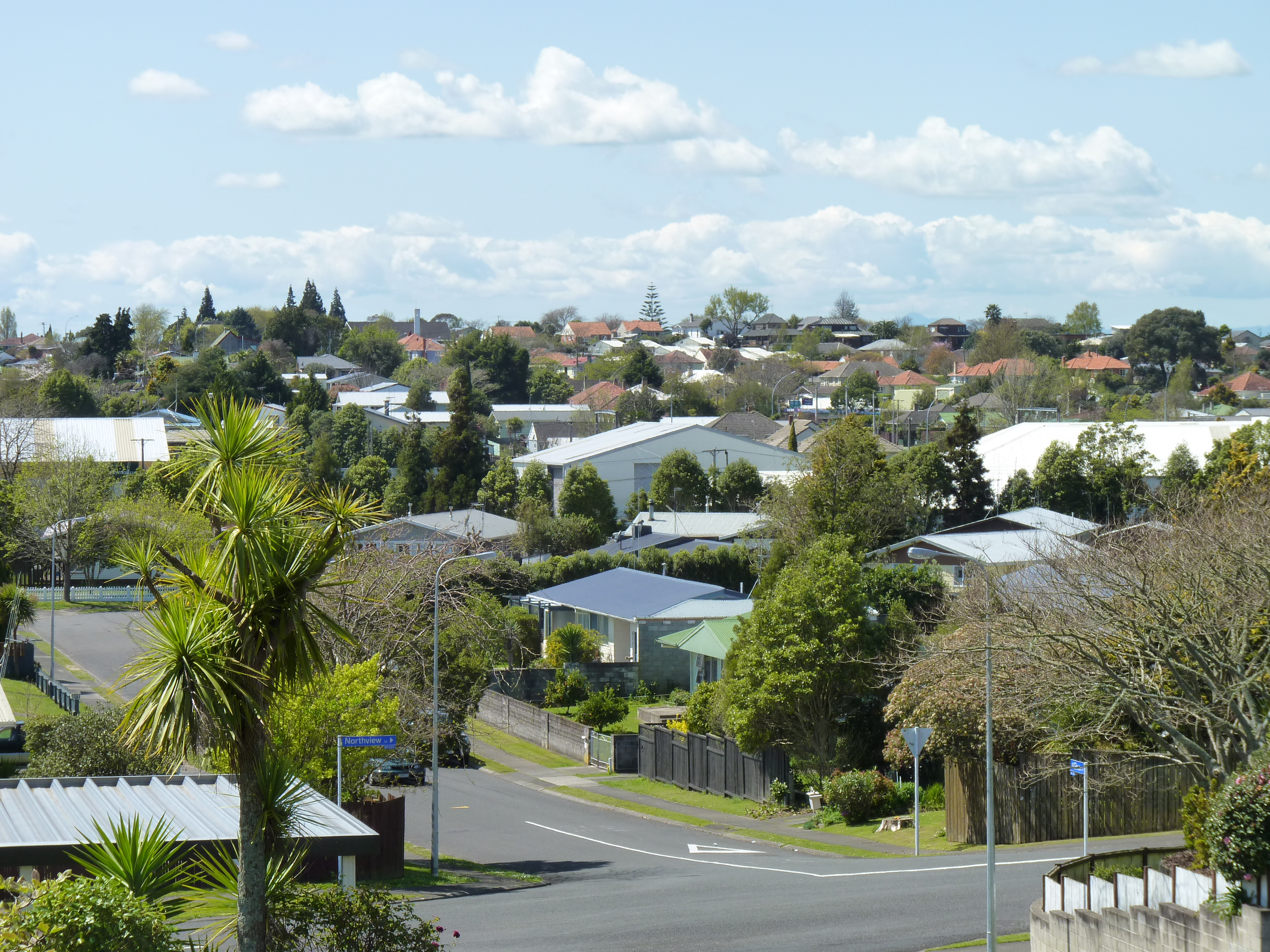
- Livingstone, Hamilton
- Interactive map of Livingstone
- Coordinates: 37°46′49.5″S 175°14′28.8″E
- Country: New Zealand
- City: Hamilton, New Zealand
- Electoral ward: Hamilton West
- Established: 1962

	Te Rapa
Nawton	Livingstone	Maeroa
	Dinsdale

Livingstone is a suburb in western Hamilton in New Zealand. J Livingstone, who the suburb is named after, owned and subdivided a large proportion of the area in 1916. The suburb became a part of Hamilton in 1962.

It is usually described as part of Nawton, Nawton Primary School is on Livingstone Avenue and it is in Nawton East census area.

== See also ==
- Suburbs of Hamilton, New Zealand
