= Nawton, New Zealand =

Suburb of Hamilton, New Zealand

Nawton
- Suburb
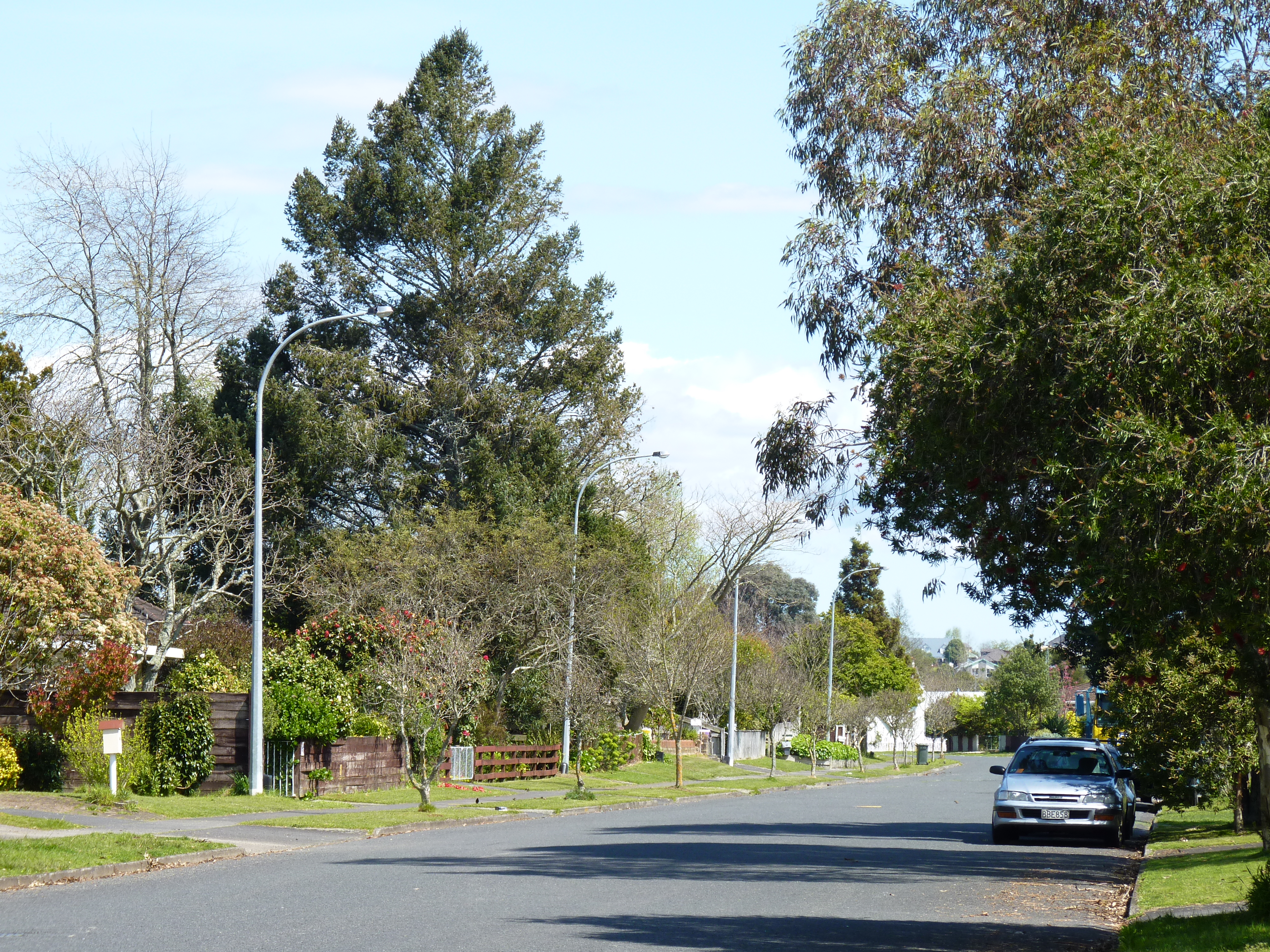
- Nawton, Hamilton
- Interactive map of Nawton
- Coordinates: 37.778°S 175.236°E
- Country: New Zealand
- City: Hamilton, New Zealand
- Local authority: Hamilton City Council
- Electoral ward: West Ward

Area
  - Land: 327 ha (810 acres)

Population (June 2025)
  - Total: 12,380
  - Density: 3,790/km^{2} (9,810/sq mi)

| Thornton | Crawshaw | Te Rapa |
| Grandview Heights | Nawton | Forest Lake, Maeroa |
| Western Heights | Dinsdale | Livingstone |

Nawton is a community suburb in western Hamilton in New Zealand.

== Features ==
Within Nawton are Playworx Kindy, an Anglican church, the Yardhouse bar, and the Sugar Bowl café

== Demographics ==
Nawton covers 3.27 km^{2} (1.26 sq mi) and had an estimated population of 12,380 as of June 2025, with a population density of 5,137 people per km^{2}.

Historical population
| Year | Pop. | ±% p.a. |
|---|---|---|
| 2006 | 10,158 | — |
| 2013 | 10,368 | +0.29% |
| 2018 | 11,124 | +1.42% |
| 2023 | 11,391 | +0.48% |

Nawton had a population of 11,391 in the 2023 New Zealand census, an increase of 267 people (2.4%) since the 2018 census, and an increase of 1,023 people (9.9%) since the 2013 census. There were 5,538 males, 5,814 females and 39 people of other genders in 3,729 dwellings. 3.3% of people identified as LGBTIQ+. The median age was 31.5 years (compared with 38.1 years nationally). There were 2,715 people (23.8%) aged under 15 years, 2,661 (23.4%) aged 15 to 29, 4,776 (41.9%) aged 30 to 64, and 1,239 (10.9%) aged 65 or older.

People could identify as more than one ethnicity. The results were 54.4% European (Pākehā); 40.0% Māori; 10.3% Pasifika; 16.3% Asian; 1.8% Middle Eastern, Latin American and African New Zealanders (MELAA); and 1.6% other, which includes people giving their ethnicity as "New Zealander". English was spoken by 94.3%, Māori language by 11.1%, Samoan by 1.2%, and other languages by 13.6%. No language could be spoken by 2.9% (e.g. too young to talk). New Zealand Sign Language was known by 1.0%. The percentage of people born overseas was 19.7, compared with 28.8% nationally.

Religious affiliations were 27.4% Christian, 4.1% Hindu, 1.9% Islam, 2.9% Māori religious beliefs, 1.4% Buddhist, 0.4% New Age, 0.1% Jewish, and 2.7% other religions. People who answered that they had no religion were 51.6%, and 7.7% of people did not answer the census question.

Of those at least 15 years old, 1,314 (15.1%) people had a bachelor's or higher degree, 4,677 (53.9%) had a post-high school certificate or diploma, and 2,685 (30.9%) people exclusively held high school qualifications. The median income was $39,500, compared with $41,500 nationally. 381 people (4.4%) earned over $100,000 compared to 12.1% nationally. The employment status of those at least 15 was that 4,539 (52.3%) people were employed full-time, 972 (11.2%) were part-time, and 441 (5.1%) were unemployed.

Individual statistical areas
| Name | Area (km^{2}) | Population | Density (per km^{2}) | Dwellings | Median age | Median income |
|---|---|---|---|---|---|---|
| Crawshaw | 0.86 | 3,261 | 3,792 | 1,008 | 29.2 years | $37,500 |
| Nawton West | 1.09 | 3,756 | 3,446 | 1,230 | 33.7 years | $42,400 |
| Nawton East | 1.32 | 4,377 | 3,316 | 1,488 | 31.5 years | $38,600 |
| New Zealand | | | | | 38.1 years | $41,500 |

== Community Centres and schools ==
There are at least two community centres in Nawton. These include the Western Community Centre and the Good News Community Centre, which opened in 2014.

Nawton Primary School is a state school for year 1 to 6 students with a roll of 510. The school opened in 1960.

Fraser High School is a secondary state school for year 9 to 13 students. It has a roll of 1,446. The school was established in 1920 and called Hamilton Manual Training Centre. It moved to what is now the site of Waikato Institute of Technology and became Hamilton Technical College in 1924, then moved to its current site in 1970 and was renamed to Fraser High School after a previous principal.

Both these schools are coeducational. Rolls are as of July 2026.

Crawshaw also has a primary school.

== History ==
A community constable was removed from the area in 2014. Neil Tolan (a Hamilton community advocate) believed that the loss of community constables would have a radical impact on neighbourhoods and lead to unreported crimes. In 2014, it was found that a number of the suburb's homes were sinking. This meant that flooding and large-scale damage was caused. In April 2016, Nawton was found to be the Hamilton's worst suburb for dog attacks. In December of that year, Hamilton mayor Andrew King opened a million dollar playground at Dominion Park as part of the city council's Playgrounds of the Future plan. The playground (known as Te oko o Kirikiriroa) became one of seven destination playgrounds in the city. In 2017, a petition called for a return of devoted community police officers. The petition was co-organized by Labour MP Sue Moroney, Western Community Centre manager Neil Tolan and city councillor James Casson at that year's Waitangi Day celebrations.

== See also ==
- List of streets in Hamilton
- Suburbs of Hamilton, New Zealand
