= Dinsdale, New Zealand =

Suburb of Hamilton, New Zealand

Dinsdale
- Suburb
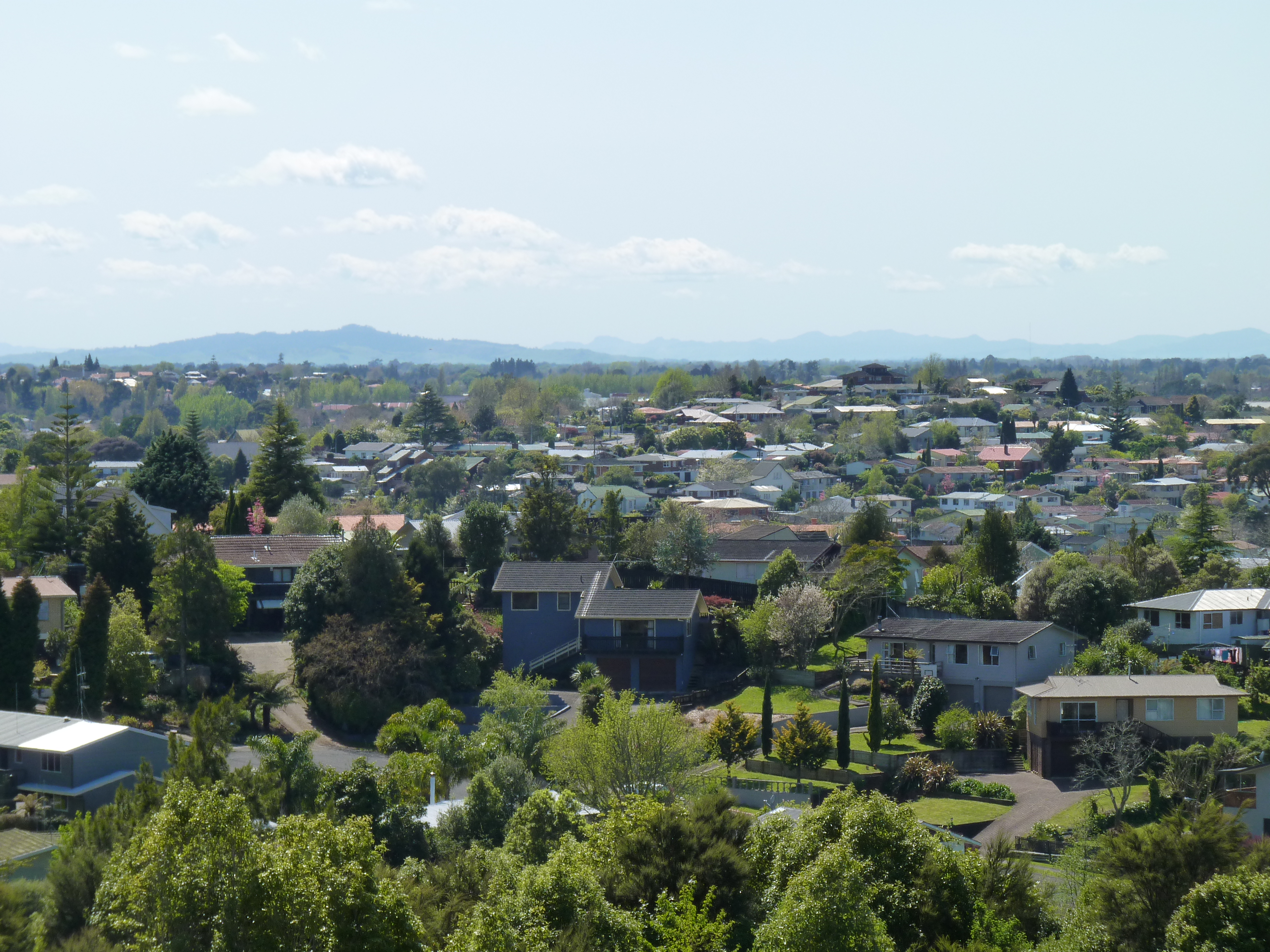
- Dinsdale, Hamilton
- Interactive map of Dinsdale
- Coordinates: 37°47′45.42″S 175°14′33.28″E
- Country: New Zealand
- City: Hamilton, New Zealand
- Local authority: Hamilton City Council
- Electoral ward: West Ward
- Established: 1962

Area
  - Land: 285 ha (700 acres)

Population (June 2025)
  - Total: 8,680
  - Density: 3,050/km^{2} (7,890/sq mi)

Western Heights	Livingstone	Maeroa
Whatawhata	Dinsdale	Frankton
Stonebridge	Ngāhinapōuri	Melville

Dinsdale is the westernmost suburb of Hamilton in New Zealand. Originally called Frankton West, it was renamed in July 1961 after Thomas Dinsdale. Dinsdale grew rapidly in the 1960s. It is located around a low ridge with some views westward to open farm land. It has a large sports ground and shopping complex with a supermarket, shops and Dinsdale Library, one of the branches of the Hamilton City Libraries. The community church of West Hamilton is located in the suburb.

== Demographics ==
Dinsdale covers 2.85 km^{2} (1.10 sq mi) and had an estimated population of 8,680 as of June 2025, with a population density of 3,046 people per km^{2}.

Historical population
Year	Pop.	±% p.a.
2006	7,548	—
2013	7,266	−0.54%
2018	7,815	+1.47%
2023	8,100	+0.72%
The 2006 population is for a larger area of 3.08 km^{2}. Source:

Dinsdale had a population of 8,100 in the 2023 New Zealand census, an increase of 285 people (3.6%) since the 2018 census, and an increase of 834 people (11.5%) since the 2013 census. There were 4,059 males, 4,002 females and 39 people of other genders in 2,841 dwellings. 4.0% of people identified as LGBTIQ+. The median age was 34.2 years (compared with 38.1 years nationally). There were 1,752 people (21.6%) aged under 15 years, 1,704 (21.0%) aged 15 to 29, 3,579 (44.2%) aged 30 to 64, and 1,065 (13.1%) aged 65 or older.

People could identify as more than one ethnicity. The results were 67.1% European (Pākehā); 30.0% Māori; 6.7% Pasifika; 14.3% Asian; 1.5% Middle Eastern, Latin American and African New Zealanders (MELAA); and 2.0% other, which includes people giving their ethnicity as "New Zealander". English was spoken by 95.4%, Māori language by 7.4%, Samoan by 0.8%, and other languages by 12.4%. No language could be spoken by 2.6% (e.g. too young to talk). New Zealand Sign Language was known by 0.7%. The percentage of people born overseas was 20.0, compared with 28.8% nationally.

Religious affiliations were 29.6% Christian, 2.8% Hindu, 2.0% Islam, 1.6% Māori religious beliefs, 1.0% Buddhist, 0.4% New Age, and 1.9% other religions. People who answered that they had no religion were 53.8%, and 7.1% of people did not answer the census question.

Of those at least 15 years old, 1,302 (20.5%) people had a bachelor's or higher degree, 3,477 (54.8%) had a post-high school certificate or diploma, and 1,575 (24.8%) people exclusively held high school qualifications. The median income was $45,000, compared with $41,500 nationally. 486 people (7.7%) earned over $100,000 compared to 12.1% nationally. The employment status of those at least 15 was that 3,531 (55.6%) people were employed full-time, 789 (12.4%) were part-time, and 204 (3.2%) were unemployed.

Individual statistical areas
Name	Area (km^{2})	Population	Density (per km^{2})	Dwellings	Median age	Median income
Dinsdale North	1.29	3,993	3,095	1,374	33.3 years	$44,700
Dinsdale South	1.56	4,107	2,633	1,464	35.0 years	$45,300
New Zealand					38.1 years	$41,500

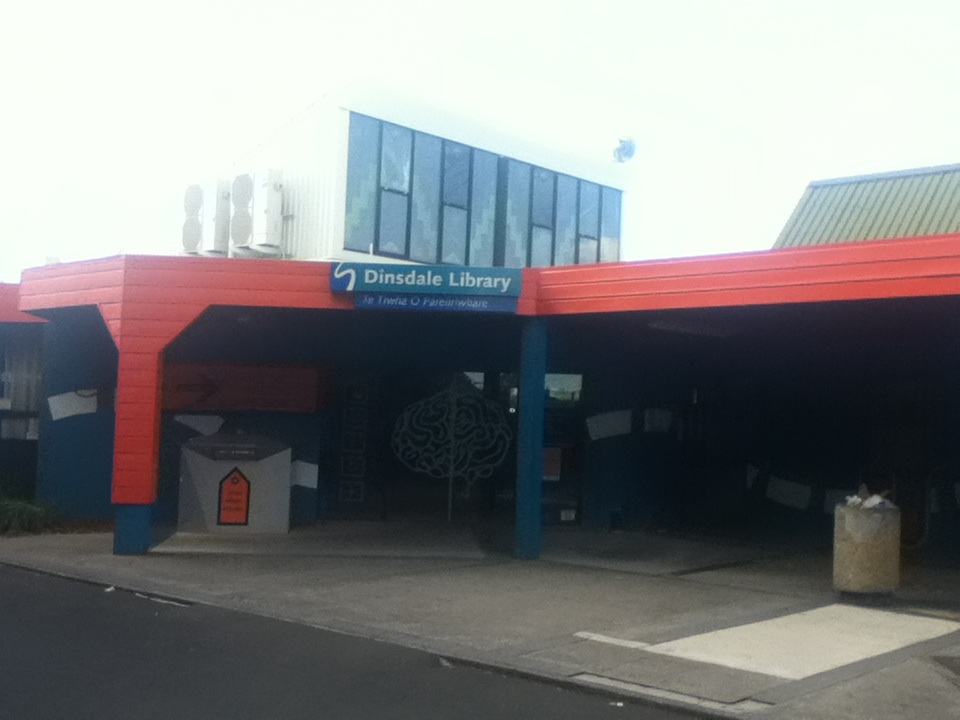
Dinsdale Library photographed in 2013

== Education ==
Aberdeen School is a coeducational contributing primary school (years 1–6) with a roll of 711 students as of July 2025. Aberdeen opened in the mid-1970s.

St. Columba's Catholic School is a state-integrated coeducational full primary school (years 1–8) with a roll of 456. It opened in 1925.

== Neighboring surroundings ==
The Taitua Arboretum may be accessed via Tills Lookout. Hamilton, New Zealand

== See also ==
- List of streets in Hamilton
- Suburbs of Hamilton, New Zealand
