= Beerescourt =

Suburb of Hamilton, New Zealand

- Suburb
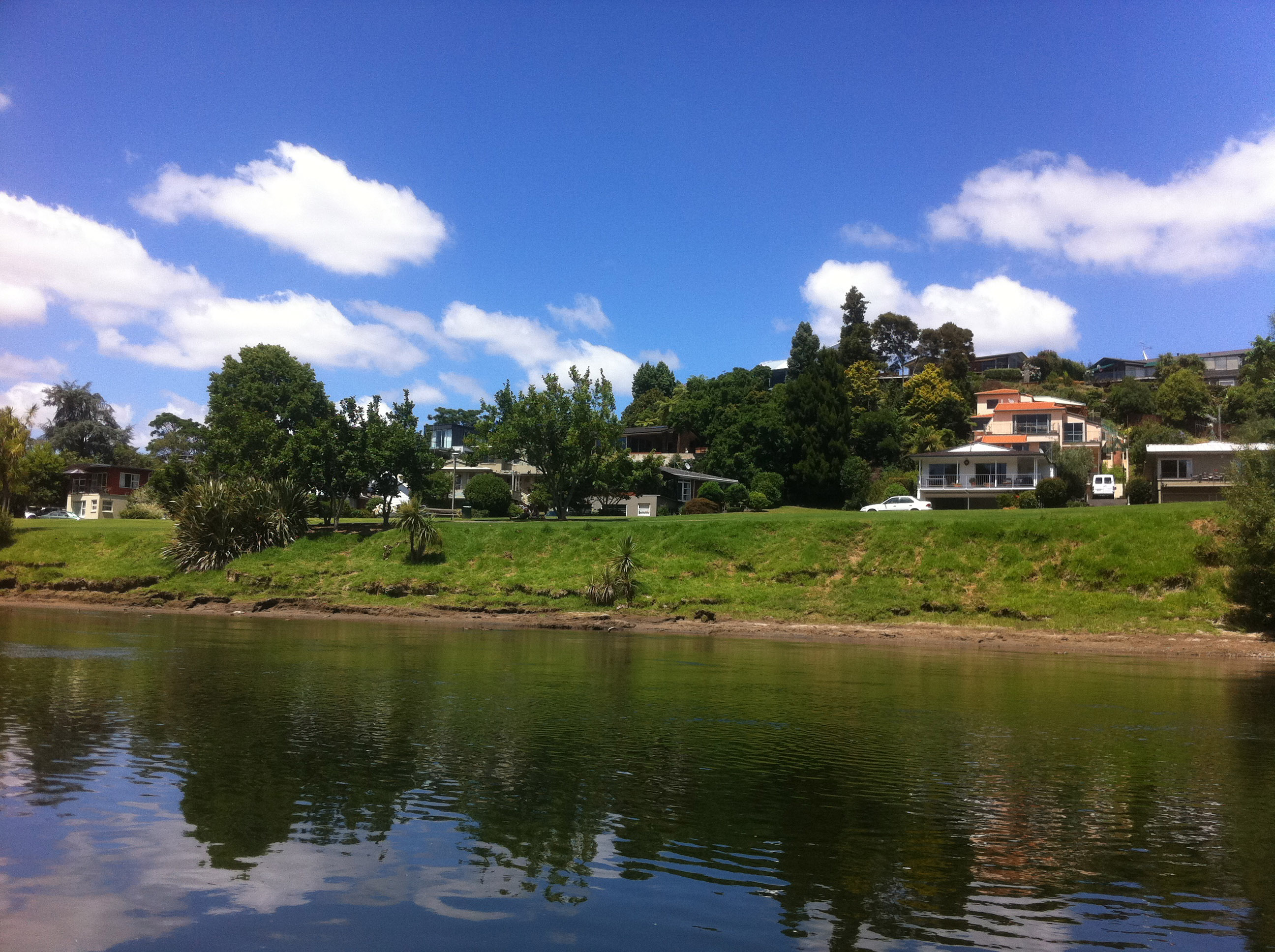
- Beerescourt, Hamilton from the Waikato River.
- Interactive map of Beerescourt
- Coordinates: 37°45′55″S 175°15′36″E
- Country: New Zealand
- City: Hamilton, New Zealand
- Local authority: Hamilton City Council
- Electoral ward: West Ward
- Established: 1949

Area
  - Land: 102 ha (250 acres)

Population (June 2025)
  - Total: 2,480
  - Density: 2,430/km^{2} (6,300/sq mi)

	Te Rapa	Queenwood
Nawton	Beerescourt	River Road
	Whitiora	Claudelands

Beerescourt is a suburb in western Hamilton, New Zealand. It is named after Capt. G. B. Beere, who was granted land in the military settlement at the conclusion of the New Zealand Wars. He set up a fort, and the area became known as Beere's Fort. The name was eventually changed to Beerescourt.

The suburb became a part of Hamilton in 1949 with the 5th boundary extension. The suburb is centred on a low hill, the location of the original fort and lies between State Highway 1 and the Waikato river giving ready access to the central business district and the riverside walkway. The hill and the riverside area give good elevated views. There is a small local shopping centre as well as quick access to shops along Te Rapa Straight.

== Demographics ==
Beerescourt covers 1.02 km^{2} (0.39 sq mi) and had an estimated population of 2,480 as of June 2025, with a population density of 2,431 people per km^{2}.

Historical population
Year	Pop.	±% p.a.
2006	2,034	—
2013	2,136	+0.70%
2018	2,220	+0.77%
2023	2,325	+0.93%

Beerescourt had a population of 2,325 in the 2023 New Zealand census, an increase of 105 people (4.7%) since the 2018 census, and an increase of 189 people (8.8%) since the 2013 census. There were 1,143 males, 1,173 females and 6 people of other genders in 897 dwellings. 3.5% of people identified as LGBTIQ+. The median age was 36.2 years (compared with 38.1 years nationally). There were 456 people (19.6%) aged under 15 years, 468 (20.1%) aged 15 to 29, 1,026 (44.1%) aged 30 to 64, and 375 (16.1%) aged 65 or older.

People could identify as more than one ethnicity. The results were 71.7% European (Pākehā); 21.9% Māori; 5.7% Pasifika; 15.2% Asian; 1.8% Middle Eastern, Latin American and African New Zealanders (MELAA); and 2.3% other, which includes people giving their ethnicity as "New Zealander". English was spoken by 95.4%, Māori language by 6.3%, Samoan by 0.4%, and other languages by 16.9%. No language could be spoken by 2.3% (e.g. too young to talk). New Zealand Sign Language was known by 0.1%. The percentage of people born overseas was 23.6, compared with 28.8% nationally.

Religious affiliations were 34.8% Christian, 3.2% Hindu, 0.9% Islam, 1.0% Māori religious beliefs, 0.5% Buddhist, 0.6% New Age, and 3.6% other religions. People who answered that they had no religion were 49.8%, and 5.5% of people did not answer the census question.

Of those at least 15 years old, 579 (31.0%) people had a bachelor's or higher degree, 948 (50.7%) had a post-high school certificate or diploma, and 342 (18.3%) people exclusively held high school qualifications. The median income was $50,400, compared with $41,500 nationally. 300 people (16.1%) earned over $100,000 compared to 12.1% nationally. The employment status of those at least 15 was that 1,032 (55.2%) people were employed full-time, 219 (11.7%) were part-time, and 39 (2.1%) were unemployed.

== Education ==
Vardon School is a coeducational state primary school for years 1 to 6, with a roll of 370 as of July 2025. The school opened in 1956.

== See also ==
- List of streets in Hamilton
- Suburbs of Hamilton, New Zealand
