= Ngāhinapōuri =

Settlement in Waikato, New Zealand

- Village
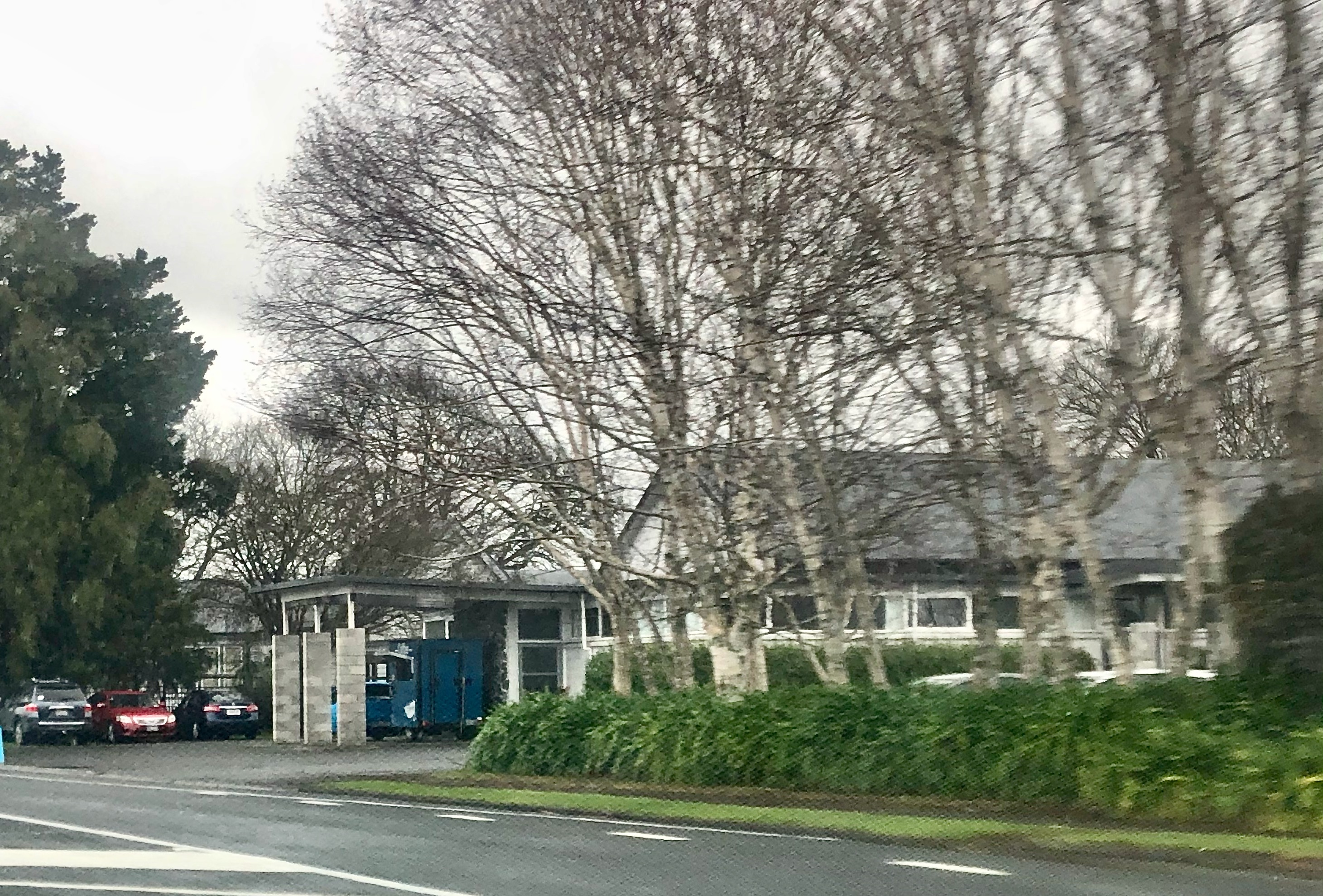
- Ngāhinapōuri Hall was built in 1913
- Interactive map of Ngāhinapōuri
- Coordinates: 37.897005°S 175.206099°E
- Country: New Zealand
- Region: Waikato
- District: Waipā District
- Ward: Pirongia-Kakepuku General Ward
- Electorates: Taranaki-King Country; Hauraki-Waikato (Māori)

Government
  - Territorial Authority: Waipā District Council
  - Regional council: Waikato Regional Council
  - Mayor of Waipa: Mike Pettit
  - Taranaki-King Country MP: Barbara Kuriger
  - Hauraki-Waikato MP: Hana-Rawhiti Maipi-Clarke

Area
  - Territorial: 1.66 km^{2} (0.64 sq mi)
- Elevation: 40 m (130 ft)

Population (June 2025)
  - Territorial: 350
  - Density: 210/km^{2} (550/sq mi)
- Time zone: UTC+12 (NZST)
  - Summer (DST): UTC+13 (NZDT)

Ngāhinapōuri is a rural community in the Waipā District and Waikato region of New Zealand's North Island. It is located on State Highway 39, between Whatawhata and Pirongia.

The rural area of Koromatua is located to the north, near the Hamilton suburb of Temple View.

The Ngāhinapōuri area and surrounding Ōhaupō, Te Rore and Harapēpē area were military outposts during the Waikato War. Military fortifications were built at the settlement and nearby Tuhikaramea and Te Rore in December 1863; Another fortification was built to the north-east, north of Ōhaupō, in April 1864.

The earliest European settlers in this area were Bohemian militiamen from the Puhoi settlement north of Auckland. As of 2015, many descendants of these militiamen still lived in the area.

The area was previously serviced by the nearby Ohaupo railway station on the North Island Main Trunk

A nine-hole golf course has been operating in the settlement since the 1940s.

Ngāhinapōuri Hall replaced a smaller hall in 1913. Beside it is the school and Stewart Reid Memorial Park. The park covers 5 1/4 acres (2.1 ha) and was donated in 1946 to commemorate a World War II pilot shot down in 1942.

== Demographics ==
Statistics New Zealand describes Ngāhinapōuri Village as a rural settlement, which covers 1.66 km^{2} (0.64 sq mi) and had an estimated population of 350 as of June 2025, with a population density of 211 people per km^{2}. The settlement is part of the larger Ngāhinapōuri statistical area.

Historical population of the settlement
Year	Pop.	±% p.a.
2006	135	—
2013	198	+5.62%
2018	231	+3.13%
2023	294	+4.94%
The 2006 population is for a smaller area of 0.37 km^{2}. Source:

Ngāhinapōuri Village had a population of 294 in the 2023 New Zealand census, an increase of 63 people (27.3%) since the 2018 census, and an increase of 96 people (48.5%) since the 2013 census. There were 147 males and 147 females in 99 dwellings. 1.0% of people identified as LGBTIQ+. The median age was 40.8 years (compared with 38.1 years nationally). There were 75 people (25.5%) aged under 15 years, 33 (11.2%) aged 15 to 29, 147 (50.0%) aged 30 to 64, and 39 (13.3%) aged 65 or older.

People could identify as more than one ethnicity. The results were 85.7% European (Pākehā); 12.2% Māori; 6.1% Asian; and 4.1% Middle Eastern, Latin American and African New Zealanders (MELAA). English was spoken by 98.0%, Māori language by 3.1%, and other languages by 9.2%. No language could be spoken by 2.0% (e.g. too young to talk). The percentage of people born overseas was 21.4, compared with 28.8% nationally.

Religious affiliations were 29.6% Christian, 2.0% Buddhist, and 1.0% other religions. People who answered that they had no religion were 59.2%, and 8.2% of people did not answer the census question.

Of those at least 15 years old, 51 (23.3%) people had a bachelor's or higher degree, 132 (60.3%) had a post-high school certificate or diploma, and 30 (13.7%) people exclusively held high school qualifications. The median income was $66,100, compared with $41,500 nationally. 57 people (26.0%) earned over $100,000 compared to 12.1% nationally. The employment status of those at least 15 was that 132 (60.3%) people were employed full-time and 21 (9.6%) were part-time.

=== Ngāhinapōuri statistical area ===
Ngāhinapōuri statistical area covers 73.94 km^{2} (28.55 sq mi) and had an estimated population of 1,960 as of June 2025, with a population density of 27 people per km^{2}.

Historical population for the statistical area
Year	Pop.	±% p.a.
2006	1,326	—
2013	1,461	+1.39%
2018	1,668	+2.69%
2023	1,803	+1.57%

Ngāhinapōuri had a population of 1,803 in the 2023 New Zealand census, an increase of 135 people (8.1%) since the 2018 census, and an increase of 342 people (23.4%) since the 2013 census. There were 900 males, 900 females and 3 people of other genders in 612 dwellings. 1.5% of people identified as LGBTIQ+. The median age was 41.0 years (compared with 38.1 years nationally). There were 390 people (21.6%) aged under 15 years, 273 (15.1%) aged 15 to 29, 846 (46.9%) aged 30 to 64, and 294 (16.3%) aged 65 or older.

People could identify as more than one ethnicity. The results were 89.4% European (Pākehā); 13.6% Māori; 2.8% Pasifika; 6.5% Asian; 1.2% Middle Eastern, Latin American and African New Zealanders (MELAA); and 2.0% other, which includes people giving their ethnicity as "New Zealander". English was spoken by 97.8%, Māori language by 2.7%, Samoan by 0.2%, and other languages by 8.2%. No language could be spoken by 1.8% (e.g. too young to talk). New Zealand Sign Language was known by 0.5%. The percentage of people born overseas was 14.3, compared with 28.8% nationally.

Religious affiliations were 32.3% Christian, 0.7% Hindu, 0.5% Islam, 0.8% Māori religious beliefs, 0.5% Buddhist, 0.3% New Age, and 1.5% other religions. People who answered that they had no religion were 57.2%, and 6.3% of people did not answer the census question.

Of those at least 15 years old, 336 (23.8%) people had a bachelor's or higher degree, 810 (57.3%) had a post-high school certificate or diploma, and 258 (18.3%) people exclusively held high school qualifications. The median income was $54,700, compared with $41,500 nationally. 279 people (19.7%) earned over $100,000 compared to 12.1% nationally. The employment status of those at least 15 was that 828 (58.6%) people were employed full-time, 192 (13.6%) were part-time, and 15 (1.1%) were unemployed.

Prior to 2018 the relevant statistical area covered 132.75 km^{2} (51.26 sq mi), so the earlier comparative figures are in brackets. Areas to the south and north east have been transferred to other areas.

Year	Population	Average age	Households	Median income	National median income
2001	(1728)	34	(543)	$26,200	$18,500
2006	1326 (1980)	36.2	(654)	$33,200	$24,100
2013	1461 (2106)	39.9	(735)	$38,800	$27,900
2018	1668	40.3	573	$42,400	$31,800
2023	1803	41.0	612	$54,700	$41,500

== Education ==
Ngahinapouri School is a co-educational state primary school established in 1877, with a roll of 185 as of July 2026.
