= Temple View =

Suburb of Hamilton, New Zealand

- Suburb
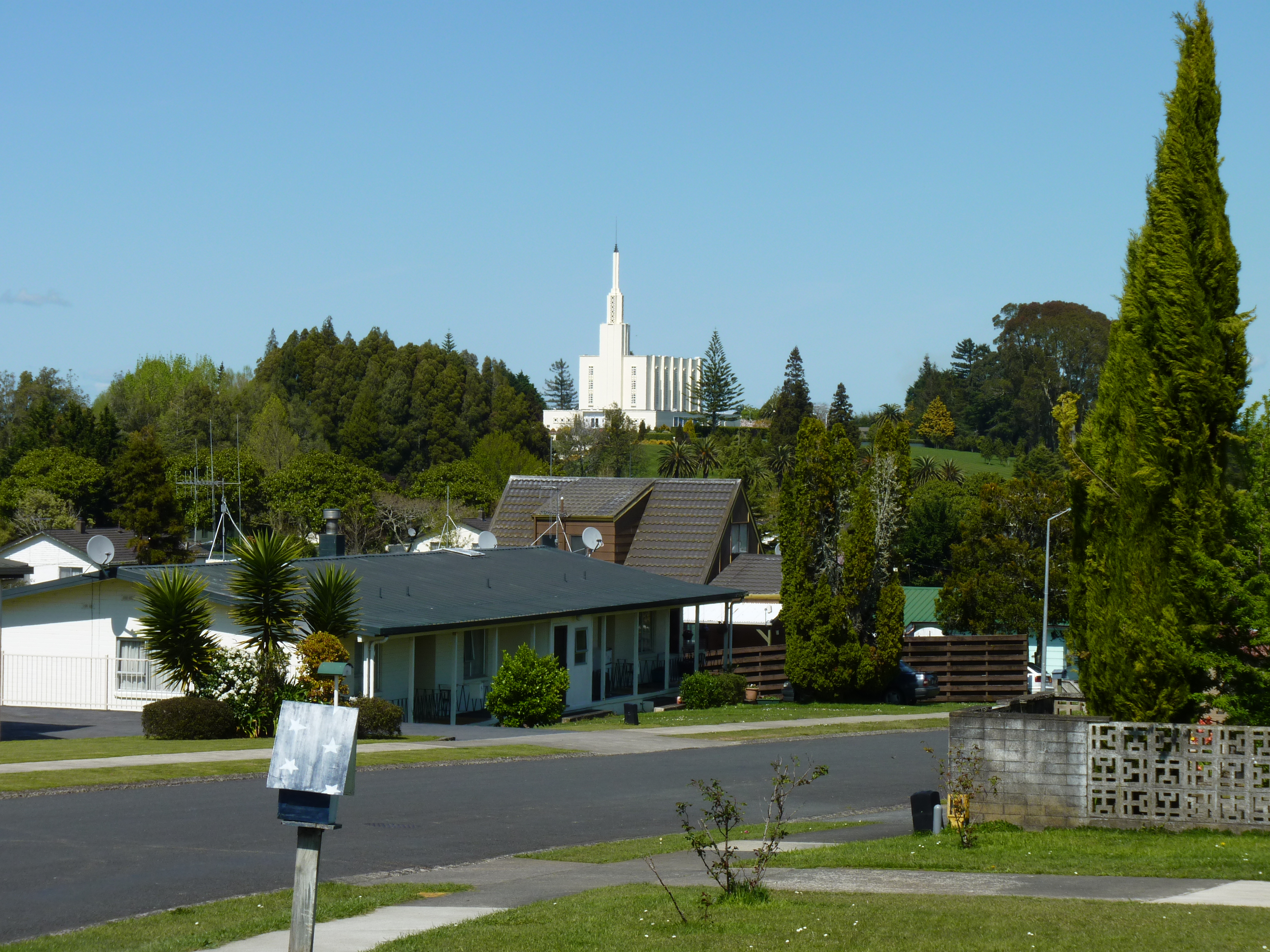
- Temple View, Hamilton
- Interactive map of Temple View
- Coordinates: 37°49′14.71″S 175°13′36.27″E
- Country: New Zealand
- City: Hamilton, New Zealand
- Local authority: Hamilton City Council
- Electoral ward: West Ward
- Established: 1950

Area
  - Land: 437 ha (1,080 acres)

Population (June 2025)
  - Total: 1,440
  - Density: 330/km^{2} (853/sq mi)

Whatawhata	Dinsdale
	Temple View	Melville
Ngāhinapōuri		Lake Ngaroto

Temple View is a suburb of the city of Hamilton, New Zealand. Temple View was established in the 1950s from the construction of the Hamilton New Zealand Temple and the Church College of New Zealand by the Church of Jesus Christ of Latter-day Saints (LDS Church). Access to the suburb is through Dinsdale, and then along Tuhikaramea Road.

In 2018 the college was demolished and it was reportedly planned to be replaced by housing.

== Demographics ==
Temple View covers 4.37 km^{2} (1.69 sq mi) and had an estimated population of 1,440 as of June 2025, with a population density of 330 people per km^{2}.

Historical population
Year	Pop.	±% p.a.
2006	1,344	—
2013	1,179	−1.85%
2018	1,185	+0.10%
2023	1,305	+1.95%

Temple View had a population of 1,305 in the 2023 New Zealand census, an increase of 120 people (10.1%) since the 2018 census, and an increase of 126 people (10.7%) since the 2013 census. There were 642 males and 660 females in 363 dwellings. 1.4% of people identified as LGBTIQ+. The median age was 29.9 years (compared with 38.1 years nationally). There were 354 people (27.1%) aged under 15 years, 297 (22.8%) aged 15 to 29, 477 (36.6%) aged 30 to 64, and 171 (13.1%) aged 65 or older.

People could identify as more than one ethnicity. The results were 57.5% European (Pākehā); 69.2% Māori; 24.8% Pasifika; 8.0% Asian; 0.5% Middle Eastern, Latin American and African New Zealanders (MELAA); and 0.5% other, which includes people giving their ethnicity as "New Zealander". English was spoken by 95.9%, Māori language by 13.6%, Samoan by 2.1%, and other languages by 6.9%. No language could be spoken by 2.5% (e.g. too young to talk). New Zealand Sign Language was known by 0.2%. The percentage of people born overseas was 17.5, compared with 28.8% nationally.

Religious affiliations were 79.5% Christian, 0.9% Hindu, 0.5% Islam, 0.5% Māori religious beliefs, 0.5% New Age, and 0.9% other religions. People who answered that they had no religion were 14.0%, and 3.4% of people did not answer the census question.

Of those at least 15 years old, 282 (29.7%) people had a bachelor's or higher degree, 504 (53.0%) had a post-high school certificate or diploma, and 168 (17.7%) people exclusively held high school qualifications. The median income was $38,900, compared with $41,500 nationally. 75 people (7.9%) earned over $100,000 compared to 12.1% nationally. The employment status of those at least 15 was that 453 (47.6%) people were employed full-time, 135 (14.2%) were part-time, and 24 (2.5%) were unemployed.

== History ==
=== 1950–1953 ===
The construction of the school and the temple commenced in the 1950s, overseen by George R. Beisinger, the general supervisor of Church building in the South Pacific. Because of stringent economic conditions in New Zealand, no subcontractors could be engaged, no skilled labour was available, and there were no domestic sources of supply for the bulk of needed materials. He would have to import his own cement, hardware, structural and other materials mostly from the US. As for labour he would have to leave that to providence.

The labour for the construction was performed by volunteer workers known as labour missionaries. The workers were given a small allowance of 10 shillings per week for basic necessities, and initially were called to serve for two years. Many however extended their time upwards to between 8 and 10 years.

When they arrived, the missionaries converged on a home called the "Green House" that had been moved from one part of the project to its new location for meetings, meals at times and as a general place to socialise. There was a movie night once a week. It also served as temporary accommodation for some of the missionaries. The winter at this particular time was harsh (by New Zealand standards) and the land surrounding the green house was mud. The only available form of transportation at the time happened to be a jeep which was put to good use by Elder Beisinger to get around the project.

Church services were conducted for a time in a building in the former Garden Place in Hamilton, which competed with another church on the street below. Later early morning seminary type meetings were held on the building site for the missionaries before going to work.

The first house was completed in 1952 and occupied by George Beisinger.

A large part of the farmland of the project was peat, and it was transformed slowly into arable land with the help of an agricultural expert called from the U.S. Often the peat would burn, and it wasn't unusual to see peat fires off in the distance. There was often a dusty reddish atmosphere about parts of the project because of the peat. The farmland itself became a source of vegetables for the missionaries. Wheat was also grown, and there were also cattle and sheep.

The bricks used for construction were manufactured at an onsite plant that was put into operation in 1951. Many of the bricks were sent abroad for use in buildings in Tonga and Samoa. A new plant was built in 1956, and it was noted that the quality of the bricks manufactured improved greatly.

=== 1954–1955 ===
Church activities started to be held at Temple View in 1954, and these were called "Hui Tau". The activities, which usually lasted for a week, included dancing, singing, sports, and church services. They were attended by LDS members and missionaries from across New Zealand. The proselyting missionaries were billeted out with various families in Temple View. The members who had traveled far usually stayed in makeshift accommodations. Initially many stayed in improvised sleeping quarters in the joinery building which was one of the first of the bigger buildings constructed and the school classroom buildings. The various musical items, skits and other stage activities were held in the joinery building in the evenings. For the next "Hui Taus" accommodations were in tents which at the time were located on farmland below the schools tennis courts, next to what was called "Mara Park".

Accommodation was built for single men and for families. The single men were accommodated in a dormitory which was nicknamed "the bunkhouse". The men's showers were located across from their accommodation. Small cottages were built for the families in the area behind where the George R. Biesinger (GRB) Hall is today.Concrete pathways were built to connect the buildings. There was a small canteen to serve the basic daily needs of the missionaries.

Food was sent in from members throughout the country, and some was grown or made locally. It was also standard procedure for golden queen peaches to be sent from Hawkes Bay to be made into preserves during the summer months. Butter was also manufactured on site. A makeshift abattoir was built to provide the meat for consumption. At times younger children (both local and American) would wait for the slaughter of the sheep to retrieve knucklebones for a school time game.

The construction of amenities, general purpose buildings, and school buildings occupied the lives of the building missionaries during their working hours. Concrete was poured by hand via a portable concrete mixer that was loaded by hand with the correct mix of sand and concrete, mixed with the right amount of water and then poured into wheelbarrows which the building missionaries wheeled to wherever it was needed. The whole of the project was usually mobilized for a cement pour, and the sisters always provided refreshments for the workers throughout the night.

"Kai Hall" became the church service building on Sunday while construction on site was in progress. The building was also used for social activities as well. Movies were shown on Friday night. In the evenings a section of the building was used as a gymnasium for the building missionaries during their after hours. The labour missionaries held many joint social activities with the public from Hamilton in this building. These activities such as formal dances and concerts did much for local public relations.

There was also a big band scene. A band was formed from the building missionaries who were instrumentalists, which performed at concerts and for any major ball that was held. At about this same time a big band ensemble from the US was touring New Zealand, and as part of their tour they visited Temple View and performed. In time the music of choice for local dances came from the younger missionary groups that comprised 3 guitarists and a drummer. Several concerts were also performed by the building missionaries in the Embassy theatre in Hamilton.

=== 1955–1958 ===
David O. McKay visited New Zealand in 1955, and was duly impressed with the project. He initially came to curtail the building programme, but on visiting with the members, feeling their enthusiasm and goodwill and inspecting the construction sites he decided to expand it. He authorised the construction of two more buildings: the David O. McKay Auditorium and the Matthew Cowley administration building. The classrooms and the dormitories under construction were initially to be the extent of the school. A little later on looking up at the hill of the farm adjacent to the project he pointed and said a "there we shall build a temple".

The building programme took on added emphasis with the announcement of the construction of the Temple and the two additional school buildings. The ground for the temple was broken on 21 December by President Wendell B. Mendenhall. President McKay had given everyone two years to build the temple. Elder Rosenvall who was previously working on the motel was set apart to supervise the building of the temple.

As the project grew it became a centre of attraction for the people in the area, and tours were conducted for the general public around the project on the weekends.

== Education ==
Koromatua School is a co-educational state primary school located south-east of the main Temple View Village, with an enrolment of 212 as of October 2025.
