= Rangiriri railway station =

Railway station in New Zealand

Rangiriri Railway Station
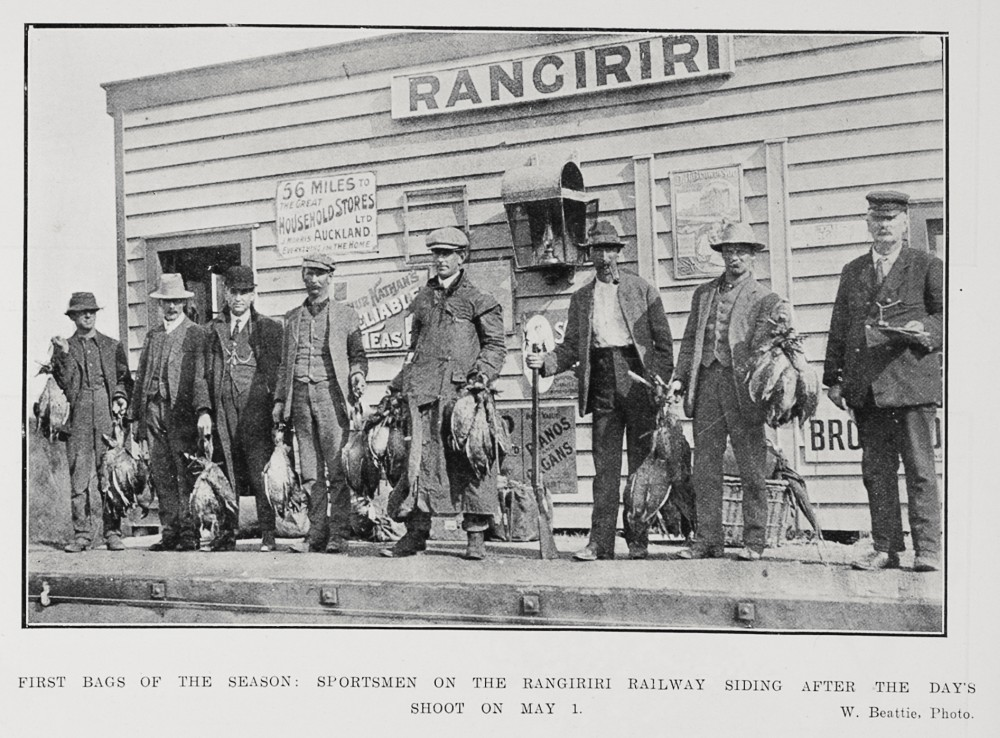
- Rangiriri Railway Station; Auckland Weekly News 7 May 1914

General information
- Location: Rangiriri; New Zealand
- Coordinates: 37.433023°S 175.150008°E
- Elevation: 9 m (30 ft)
- Owner: KiwiRail Network
- Line: North Island Main Trunk
- Distance: Wellington 588.2 km (365.5 mi)
- Tracks: double track from 14 December 1958

History
- Opened: 13 August 1877
- Closed: 21 July 1957

Services
Preceding station	Historical railways	Following station
Te Kauwhata; Line open, station closed 3.32 km (2.06 mi) towards Auckland	North Island Main Trunk; KiwiRail	Ohinewai; Line open, station closed 7.26 km (4.51 mi) towards Wellington
Location

Rangiriri was a flag station about 2 km (1.2 mi) south-east of Rangiriri, near the end of Te Onetea Road, on the North Island Main Trunk line, in the Waikato District of New Zealand, 56 mi (90 km) south of Auckland.

== History ==
=== Construction ===
Work started on the Mercer-Ngāruawāhia extension from 7 January 1874, with the arrival of the volunteer engineer militia, who camped at the redoubt. On 10 January they were inspected by the Superintendent of Auckland Province, who then dug the first sod at Ngāruawāhia. There was also a camp at Taupiri and the militia built the Rangiriri to Ngāruawāhia section, whilst the bridges and the 10 mi 13 ch (16.4 km) Mercer to Rangiriri part of the line were built by contractors, Martin & Briton. A quarry at Taupiri supplied ballast for the line. The district engineer in charge of building the railway was James Stewart.

=== 1877-1957 ===
The station opened on 13 August 1877, with the extension of the line from Mercer to Ngāruawāhia, or Newcastle, though the regular service began the next day. The early service averaged about 13 mph (21 km/h), taking about 4hr 30 mins to Auckland, 15mins to Ohinewai and 38mins to Ruawaro (Huntly).

By 1884 there were a shelter shed, platform, cart approach, loading bank, water supply, urinals and a passing loop for 35 wagons, increased to 70 in 1913. By 1896 there was a railway house for a ganger and more houses were added in 1921. From 1898 there was a caretaker at the station. In 1940 a public telephone was installed. A decade after closure, sale of the station building was approved on 20 April 1967 and it had gone by August 1970.

==== Track doubling and signalling ====
Track doubling to ease congestion had been authorised in 1914, but work was delayed by the war. Doubling from Ohinewai to Te Kauwhata didn't open until 14 December 1958. Rangiriri was a tablet station by 1918. Automatic colour light signals were installed in 1930 and electric lighting in 1938. The station closed before the double track came into use.

==== Freight ====
Between 1891 and 1896 a 40 ft (12 m) x 20 ft (6.1 m) goods shed (with a verandah from 1908) and a 30cwt. crane were added and by 1897 also cattle yards. A new cattle yard was built in 1925. In 1938 the wharf and siding on the Onetea Stream, to the south of the station, were dismantled.

From 1925 Firth’s had a pumice concrete works near the station, beside Te Onetea Stream, making products, such as garden rollers, water troughs, concrete posts, pipes, and washing coppers, until it relocated to Frankton about 1934, though a 1935 advertorial was by Firth Concrete, Rangiriri. 1896 returns show that Firth had an interest in goods traffic at Rangiriri at that time. In 2017 a cottage on the site was considered for historic protection, but deemed to be of insufficient significance.

=== Incidents ===
During construction, a member of the militia was injured when part of a cutting fell down in 1874.

A goods train was derailed by wrongly set points in 1884.

11 trucks fell in the swamp about 0.75 mi (1.21 km) south of the station, when a bridge collapsed due to flooding on 18 January 1893.

On a bridge north of Rangiriri a pedestrian was killed in 1914 and another in 1919.

A rail worker was killed on a jigger to the north of the station in 1941.

A truck driver was killed at the station site when the Northern Explorer hit his truck at Te Onetea Road level crossing on 27 February 2014. No one on the train was injured.
