= Rotokauri railway station =

Train station in Hamilton, New Zealand

Rotokauri Transport Hub
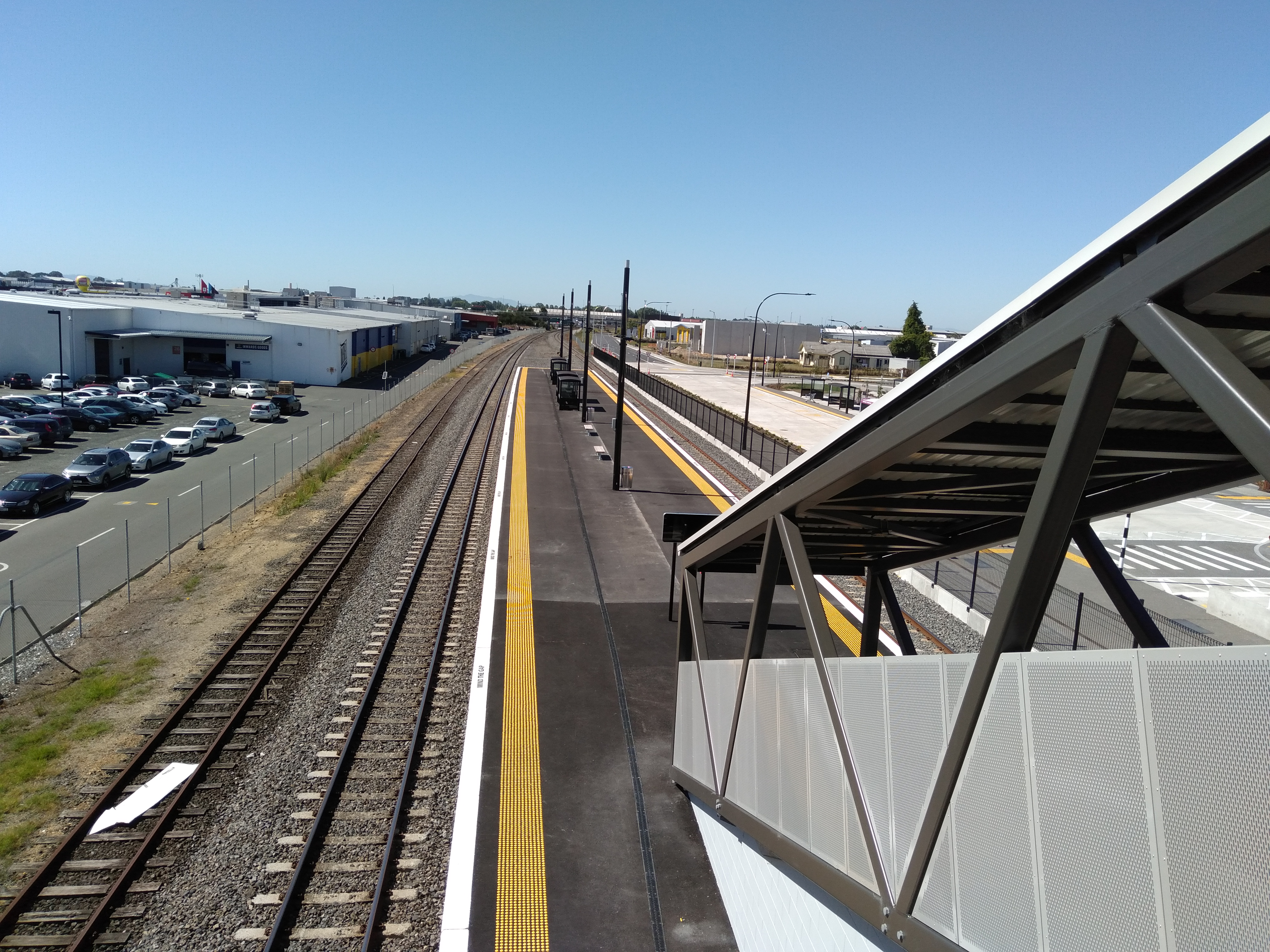
- View from overbridge looking south

General information
- Location: Tasman Road, Rotokauri, Te Rapa, New Zealand
- Coordinates: 37.745950°S 175.226539°E
- Elevation: 33 m (108 ft)
- System: Regional Rail, Bus
- Line: North Island Main Trunk
- Distance: Wellington 547.83 km (340.41 mi)
- Tracks: 2 (doubled from 30 June 1929)

Construction
- Parking: yes

Other information
- Status: Currently open
- Website: Te Huia - Rotokauri

History
- Opened: 19 December 1877 original 6 April 2021
- Closed: 10 January 1971
- Rebuilt: 2018–2021
- Former names: Te Rapa Railway Station

Services
Preceding station	KiwiRail	Following station
Huntly towards Auckland Strand	Te Huia	Hamilton (Frankton) Terminus
Historical railways
Horotiu Line open, station closed 5.71 km (3.55 mi) towards Waitematā	North Island Main Trunk KiwiRail	Te Rapa Racecourse Line open, station closed 3 km (1.9 mi) towards Wellington
Location

Rotokauri railway station (formerly Te Rapa railway station), also known as The Hub, is a railway station, park and ride, and bus station in north Hamilton, New Zealand serving Rotokauri and Te Rapa. Located on the North Island Main Trunk, it was previously a flag station, and was closed in January 1971. It reopened as an integrated transport hub in 2021 as part of Te Huia services between Hamilton and Papakura (extended to The Strand in 2022). Services started on 6 April 2021.

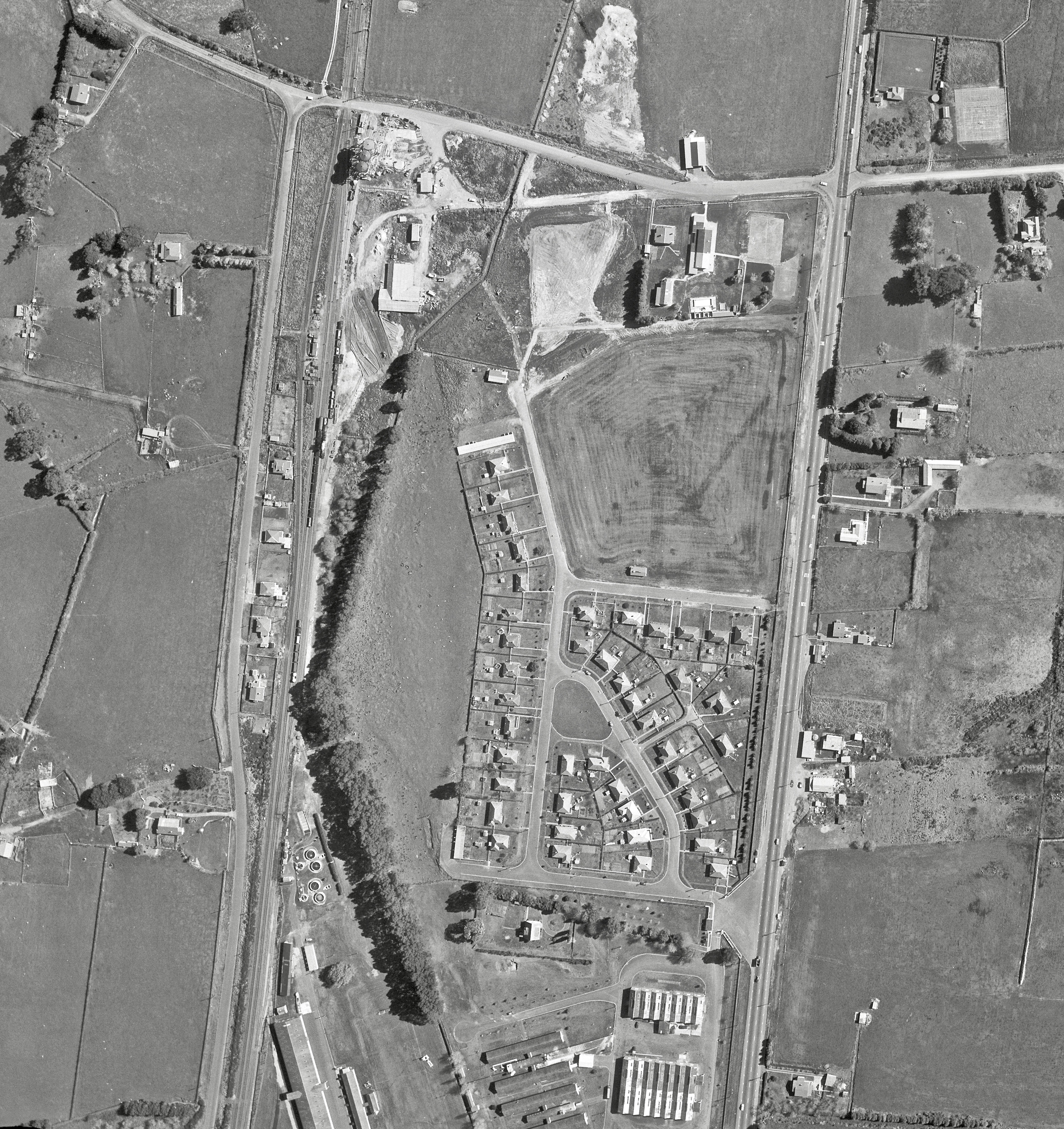
The original station was near the corner of what is now Tasman Rd and Te Kowhai Rd East. The wartime NZRAF stores base (now The Base) is at the foot of this 1961 picture. A locomotive appears to be shunting in the sidings. The new station is located slightly further south, along the NIMT.

== History ==
=== Te Rapa Railway Station ===
Opening with the Newcastle to Hamilton extension of the railway from Auckland on Wednesday 19 December 1877, Te Rapa railway station was originally 3 mi (4.8 km) south of Horotiu (then named Pukete) and 3 mi (4.8 km) north of Hamilton on the NIMT. A through siding was added in 1878, it appeared in the April 1879 timetable and, by 1884, it had a passing loop for 21 wagons, a shelter shed, platform and loading bank.

In 1916, it was equipped with distant signals and was part of the extension of automatic signalling from Ngāruawahiā to Frankton from Sunday 30 June 1929, when the sidings were switch-locked and automatically controlled and the former single track doubled. The sidings were extended into the RNZAF stores depot, to the south east, when it was built during the war There were also bulk cement and Apple & Pear Board sidings.

In July 1965 it was noted that, for the past nine months, passenger bookings had been nil and, in September, approval was given to remove the station building and low-level platform. Construction of a new marshalling yard near the Racecourse began in December 1967.

=== Rotokauri Transport Hub ===
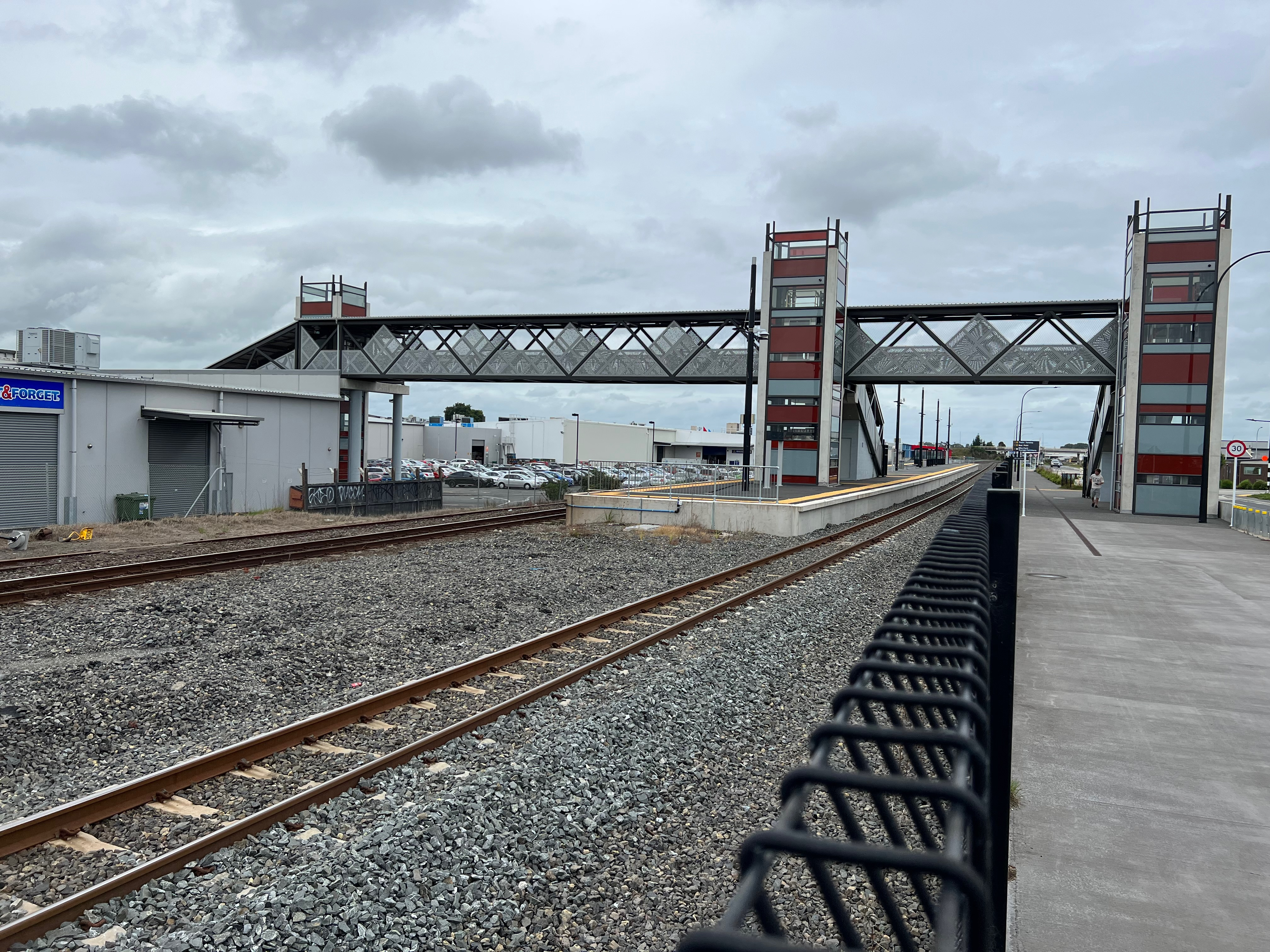
Rotokauri station looking south

Modern plans for a transport hub in north Hamilton started around 2007 in the Rotokauri Structure Plan and District Plan. Eventually, land was bought in 2017, and funding for the transport hub was announced in the 2018-2028 10 Year Plan.

At a meeting of the Hamilton Public Transport Joint Committee on November 28 2018, the Council estimated the cost of a new station, park and ride and transport hub at Rotokauri to be $21m, with $6.4m allowed to land purchasing. The plan was for an integrated transit hub in north Hamilton to connect with a proposed Hamilton to Auckland passenger train. These plans were dependent on NZTA funding for both the train and the hub itself. At the time of the Joint Committee meeting in November 2018, the opening was scheduled for March 2020.

In 2019 the Sixth Labour Government announced funding for a passenger rail link between Auckland and Hamilton, at the time called Tron Express but later called Te Huia. This funding included the construction of a transport hub in Rotokauri, alongside maintenance facilities. In March 2020, the original planned opening date, Hamilton City Council announced new opening date of the park and ride scheme on August 3 2020, and an increased cost estimate of $29m, this was planned to coincide with the commencement of Te Huia services. The new station was built just south of the site of the original station. The March 2020 announcement also stated that the transit hub would have a rail platform, park and ride carpark, bus interchange, roading upgrades, passenger bridge and stairs. The council also highlighted a delay in lift installation was "due to international supply chain issues".

On January 29 2020, a blessing ceremony was held at the transit hub ahead of its opening week. The signs around the hub include both English Language and Reo Māori names. The station has two through-platforms, three lifts, and three sets of stairs. The over-bridge links the bus terminal, the platforms, and The Base shopping mall. The Hamilton City Council has purchased land next to the carpark in order to allow for a potential carpark expansion, or another development. There have also been changes in the road layout around the hub, including the construction of a new road called Kiriwai Drive, named after a local (Kaumātua).

== Services ==
Currently the only train is Te Huia linking Hamilton to Auckland (stopping at Papakura, Puhinui, The Strand), four times daily on weekdays (two in each direction), and once each way on some Saturdays. These services started on 6 April 2021. These were the first passenger services since the original station closed. Even though the Northern Explorer passes through on the NIMT, it does not stop at this station.

Te Huia timetable
Service	Time	Destination
Weekday	6:23 a.m.	The Strand
Weekday	11:36 a.m.	Hamilton (Frankton)
Weekday	2:15 p.m.	The Strand
Weekday	7:38 p.m.	Hamilton (Frankton)
Saturday	7:49 a.m.	The Strand
Saturday	8:05 p.m.	Hamilton (Frankton)

Rotokauri Transport Hub is also a major point along several of Hamilton and Waikato's bus routes. It was planned that the hub would have 180 daily bus movements at the start, but this will increase to 400.

== Buses ==
Previous timetabled stop	Route	Next timetabled stop
Terminus	Meteor	Nawton Shopping Centre towards Hamilton Transport Centre
Terminus	09; Nawton	Fraser High School; Hamilton Transport Centre
Flagstaff towards Chartwell Shopping Centre	Orbiter	Wintec towards Dinsdale

== Accidents ==
In a fog in 1934, a southbound train from Auckland collided with a goods train. The only casualty was a pig, but the AB locomotive was thrown on its side.
