= Te Rapa =

Suburb of Hamilton, New Zealand

- Suburb
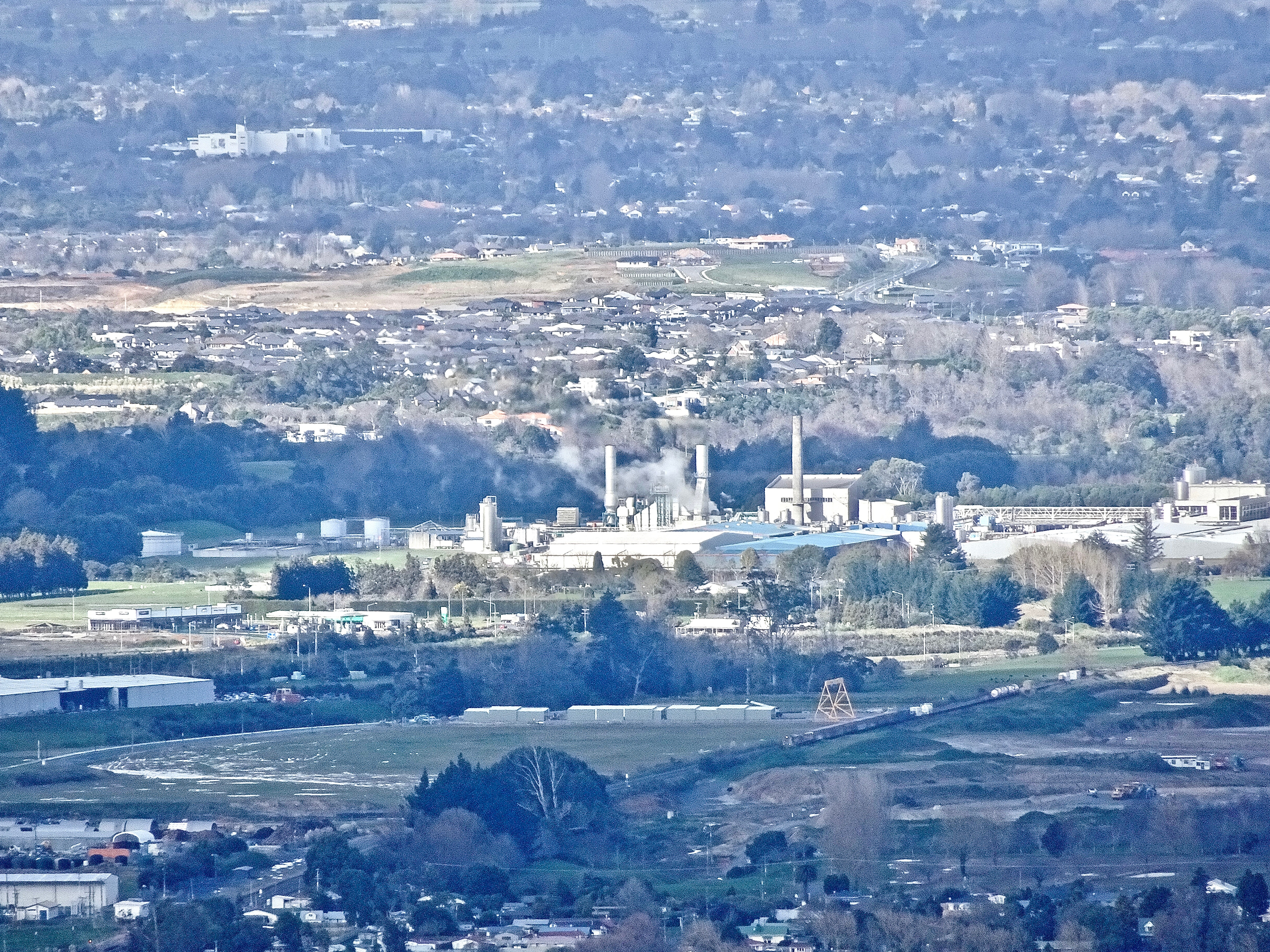
- Northern Te Rapa and dairy factory from Hakarimatas
- Interactive map of Te Rapa
- Coordinates: 37°45′28.16″S 175°14′45.17″E
- Country: New Zealand
- City: Hamilton, New Zealand
- Local authority: Hamilton City Council
- Electoral ward: West Ward

Area
  - Land: 1,316 ha (3,250 acres)

Population (June 2025)
  - Total: 370
  - Density: 28/km^{2} (73/sq mi)
- Train stations: Rotokauri railway station

Te Rapa is a mixed light industrial, large-scale retail and semi-rural suburb to the northwest of central Hamilton, New Zealand. It is built on a flat area that was previously the bed of an ancient river, the forerunner to the present Waikato River.

Te Rapa is an industrial area oriented along a north south axis. It contains several manufacturing facilities, including the Te Rapa Dairy Factory.

Te Rapa has freight and locomotive depots on the North Island Main Trunk railway.

== History ==
Te Rapa and neighbouring Pukete were important sites for the kauri gum trade of the late 19th/early 20th centuries, being some of the southern-most locations where gum could be found.

== Demographics ==
Te Rapa covers 13.16 km^{2} (5.08 sq mi) and had an estimated population of 370 as of June 2025, with a population density of 28 people per km^{2}.

Historical population
Year	Pop.	±% p.a.
2006	327	—
2013	303	−1.08%
2018	288	−1.01%
2023	348	+3.86%

Te Rapa had a population of 348 in the 2023 New Zealand census, an increase of 60 people (20.8%) since the 2018 census, and an increase of 45 people (14.9%) since the 2013 census. There were 177 males, 168 females and 3 people of other genders in 168 dwellings. 4.3% of people identified as LGBTIQ+. There were 30 people (8.6%) aged under 15 years, 48 (13.8%) aged 15 to 29, 96 (27.6%) aged 30 to 64, and 177 (50.9%) aged 65 or older.

People could identify as more than one ethnicity. The results were 80.2% European (Pākehā); 16.4% Māori; 2.6% Pasifika; 10.3% Asian; 0.9% Middle Eastern, Latin American and African New Zealanders (MELAA); and 1.7% other, which includes people giving their ethnicity as "New Zealander". English was spoken by 95.7%, Māori language by 3.4%, and other languages by 9.5%. No language could be spoken by 0.9% (e.g. too young to talk). The percentage of people born overseas was 18.1, compared with 28.8% nationally.

Religious affiliations were 48.3% Christian, 1.7% Hindu, 2.6% Māori religious beliefs, and 2.6% other religions. People who answered that they had no religion were 38.8%, and 7.8% of people did not answer the census question.

Of those at least 15 years old, 39 (12.3%) people had a bachelor's or higher degree, 162 (50.9%) had a post-high school certificate or diploma, and 123 (38.7%) people exclusively held high school qualifications. 12 people (3.8%) earned over $100,000 compared to 12.1% nationally. The employment status of those at least 15 was that 99 (31.1%) people were employed full-time, 30 (9.4%) were part-time, and 3 (0.9%) were unemployed.

Individual statistical areas
Name	Area (km^{2})	Population	Density (per km^{2})	Dwellings	Median age	Median income
Te Rapa North	8.38	135	16	54	39.5 years	$40,500
Te Rapa South	4.78	213	45	114	77.7 years	$26,300
New Zealand					38.1 years	$41,500

Te Rapa South has a high median age because 147 of the residents are in the Bupa Foxbridge Retirement Village and Care Home.

== Shops ==
Rotokauri	Horotiu	Pukete
Frankton	Te Rapa	St Andrews
Forest Lake	Crawshaw	Beerescourt

=== Post Offices ===
There are two Post Shops in Te Rapa, at The Base and at Video Ezy, which, until 2018, was one of the last two in Hamilton renting DVDs, Play Station and videos.

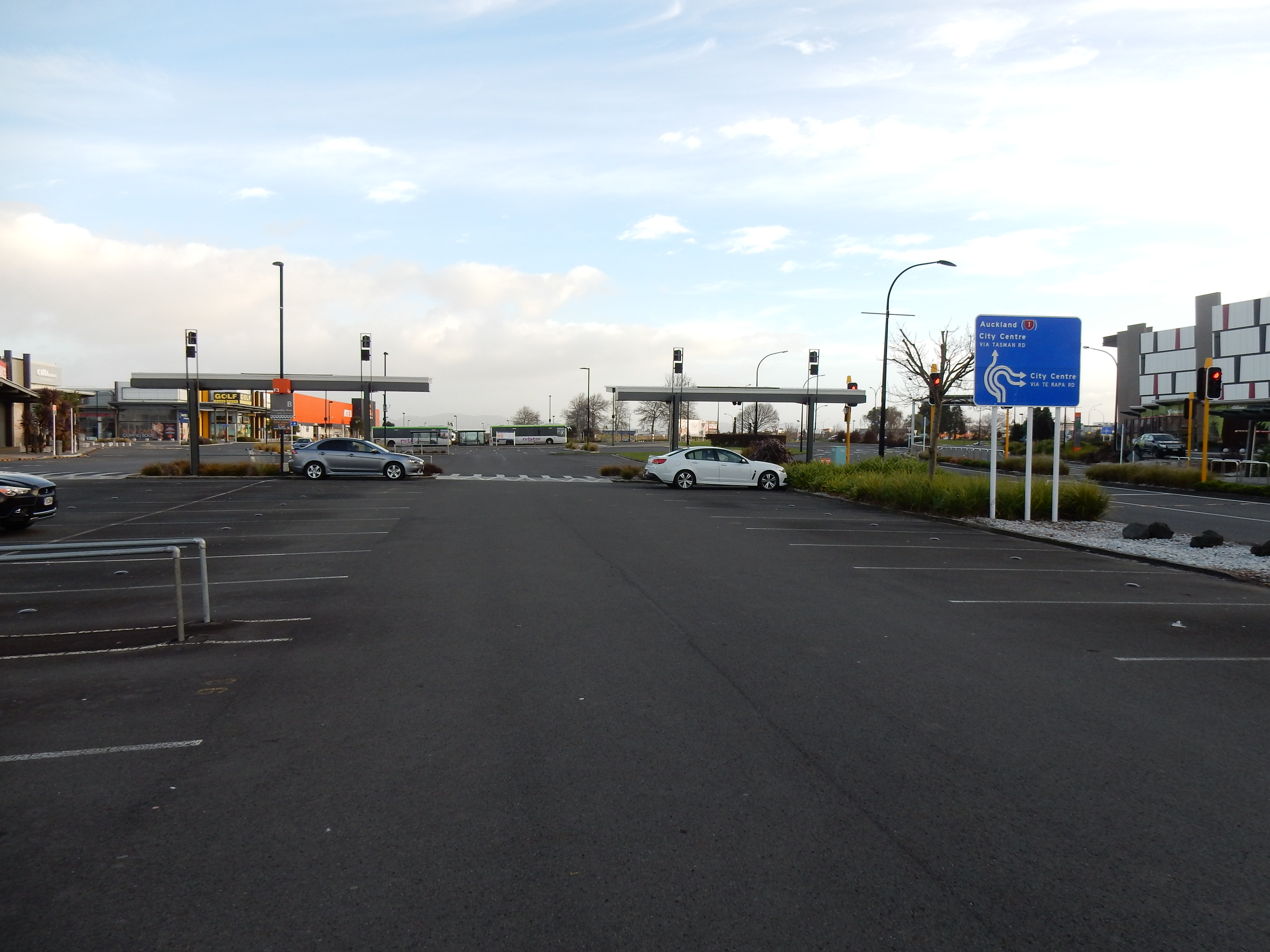
There are over 3,000 parking spaces at The Base

=== The Base ===
Prior to being handed back to the Tainui tribe by the government as part of the Raupatu land settlement in 1995, Te Rapa was the site of a Royal New Zealand Air Force base. The base served as a major Air Force stores depot. The Te Rapa Air Force base closed in 1992.

Te Rapa's shopping area includes The Base, a large-scale retail development that opened in 2005 at the site of the former air force base. With the addition of the Te Awa building in 2010, The Base became New Zealand's largest shopping mall, and still is, as of December 2011.

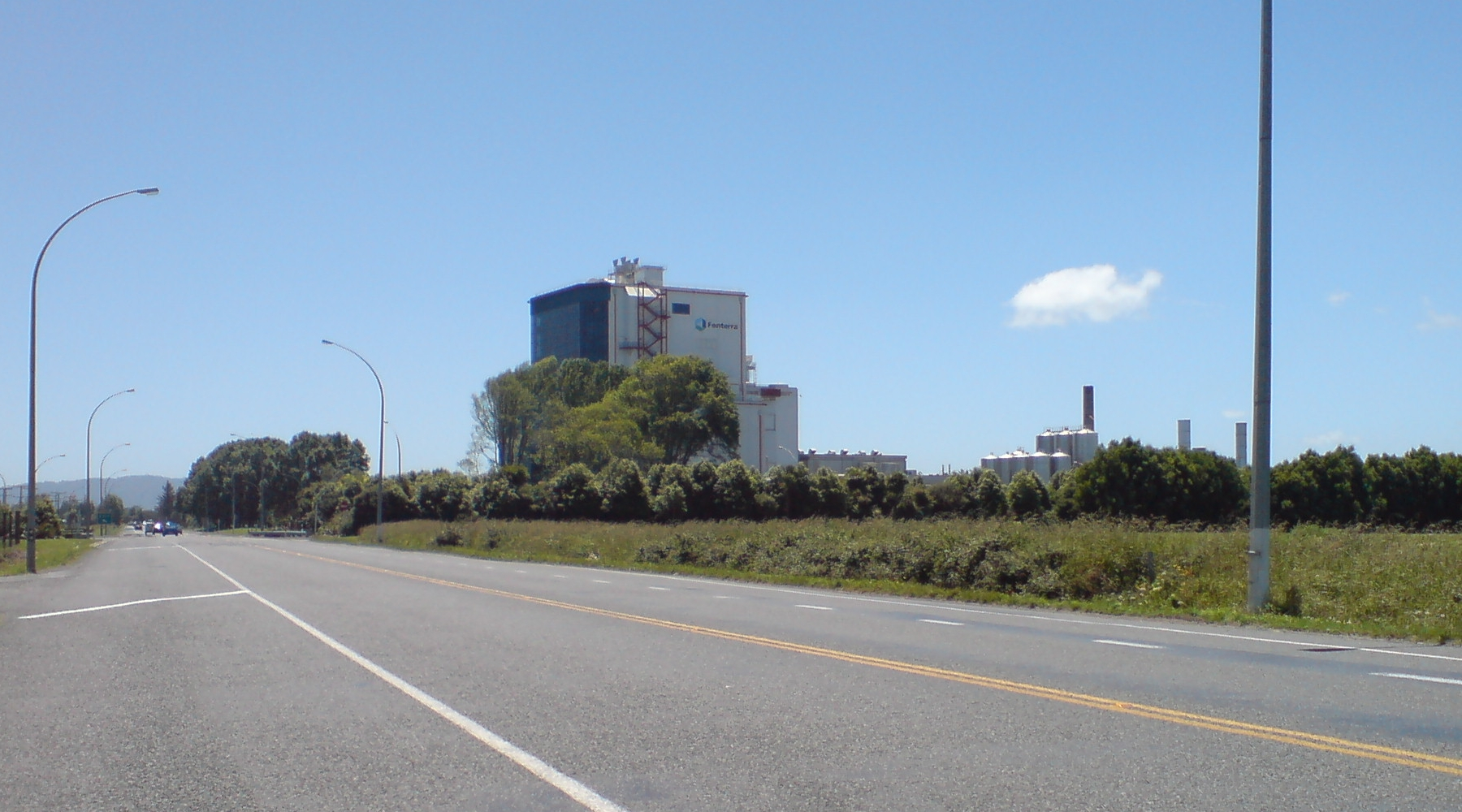
Fonterra Factory

== Fonterra Dairy Factory ==
One of Fonterra's largest dairy factories is to the east of the former SH1 in northern Te Rapa. It started to dry powder in 1967 and was officially opened on 20 April 1968 by New Zealand Co-operative Dairy Company, which became part of Fonterra in 2001. A butter, cream and cream cheese plant was added in 1997, another cream cheese line in 2013, and another butter line in about 2019.

It collects up to 7,500,000 L (1,600,000 imp gal; 2,000,000 US gal) of milk a day from 1,000 farms. It has around 500 staff, producing roughly 80,000 tonnes a year, including 650 million packets of butter and 33,500 tonnes of cream cheese.

Up to 28,000 m^{3} (6,200,000 imp gal) of Waikato River water are used in the processing. It is powered by a cogeneration unit, which uses 27 PJ (7.5×10^{15} mWh) of Genesis gas over 6 years. The chimneys are over 35 m (115 ft) high.

== Te Rapa Racecourse ==
Located in Te Rapa is Te Rapa Racecourse, Hamilton's only remaining horse racing course, and the main racecourse for the Waikato region. It has a symmetrical left-handed (anti-clockwise) track with a circumference of 1788 metres.

The course originated with Waikato Turf Club in 1873, which met at Whatawhata and Pirongia. In 1887 it became the South Auckland Racing Club at Claudelands, renamed Hamilton Racing Club in 1916 and moving to 400 acres (160 ha) at Te Rapa in 1924.

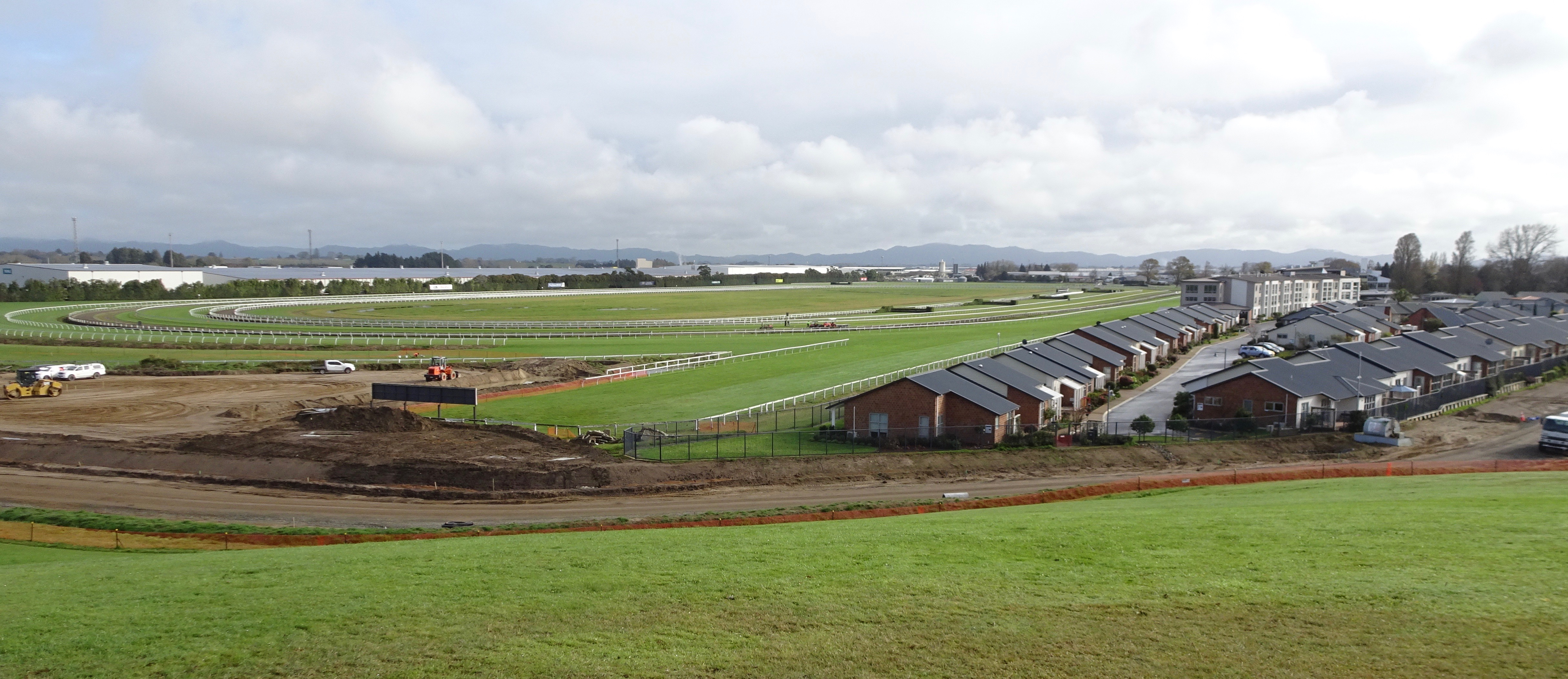
Te Rapa racecourse and part of Forest Lake Gardens Retirement Complex

Facilities and hospitalities include a members' facility and private suites.

Major races held at the Te Rapa racecourse include:

- Waikato Cup over 2400m in early December.
- Waikato Sprint over 1400m in February.
- New Zealand International Stakes also known as the Herbie Dyke Stakes, a weight-for-age event over 2000m in February.

== Waterworld ==
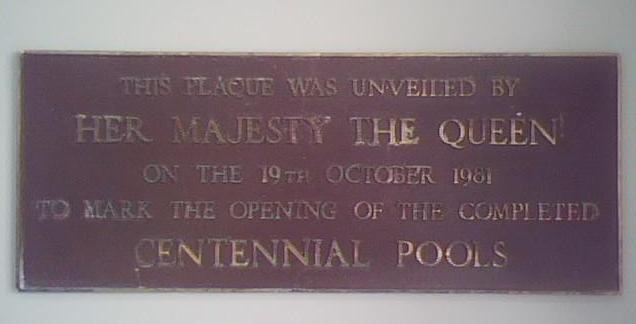
In 1981, this plaque was unveiled by Queen Elizabeth II at the Centennial Pools.

Waterworld (also known as Te Rapa Pools) is a Hamilton city council-owned pool complex in Te Rapa. In addition to the main facilities, the venue also includes a range of other options including a spa, sauna and steam rooms as well as an outdoor playground. Rides offered at Waterworld include The Python Hydroslide, the Twister Slide and The Screamer Speedslides. The complex was officially opened in late 1976, 15 years after Hamilton Jaycees suggested a new swimming pool complex in Fairfield Park. The suggestion led to an adopted proposal in 1964 to mark the city's centennial and in 1973 the decision was made to instead build the complex in Te Rapa.

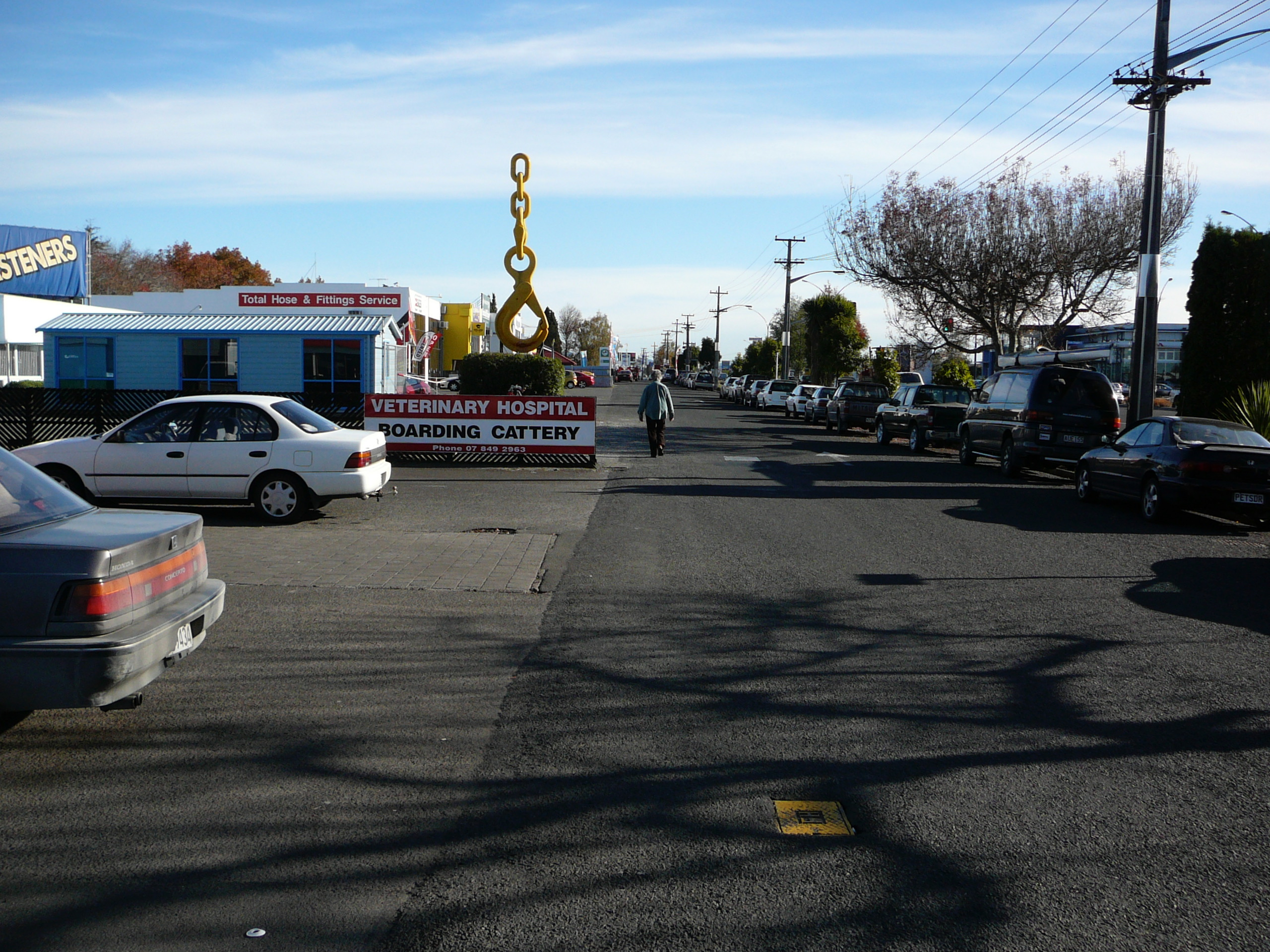
Te Rapa Road is the main road in Te Rapa. It has parking areas either side of the 4-lane road, but sometimes no footpath

== Transport ==
=== Road ===
Immediately after the invasion of the Waikato, in 1864, there was just a track across the area linking Mangaharakeke (or Manuharakeke) Pā and Kirikiriroa Pā. By 1870 bridges had been built over the streams. An 1875 report said the bridges at Waitawhiriwhiri, Mangaharakeke, Beere's Creek and Hall's Creek, between Ngāruawāhia and Hamilton on the Great South Road, had been replaced, or repaired. Until Mangaharakeke Dr opened in 2012, much of the 1860s road, now known as Te Rapa Rd, was part of SH1. See also - List of streets in Hamilton.

=== Railway ===
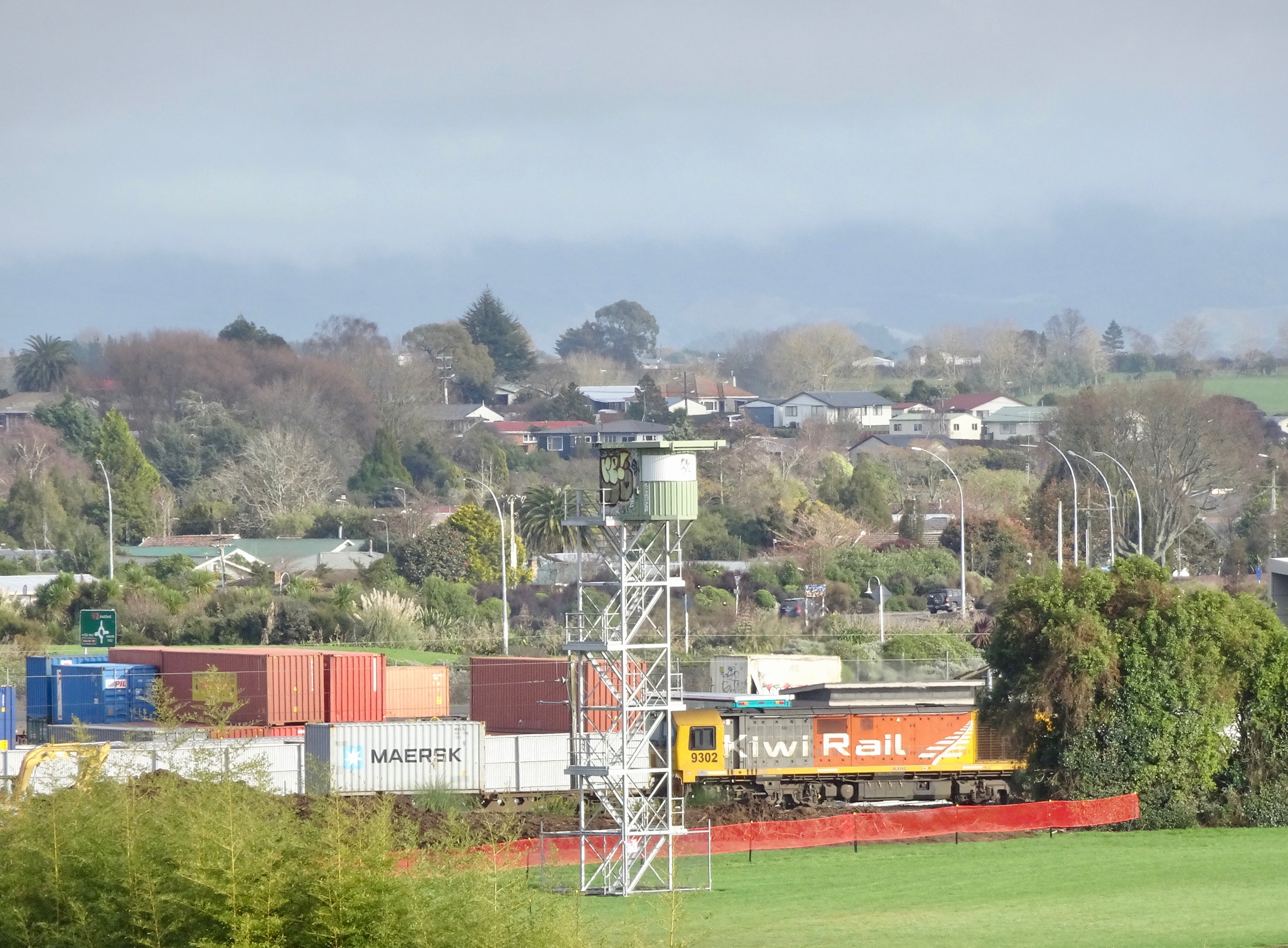
Railway sidings at Te Rapa with the suburb of Forest Lake in the background

Te Rapa railway station opened when the North Island Main Trunk was extended from Ngāruawāhia to Hamilton on 19 December 1877. Te Rapa is at the northern end of the section to Palmerston North, electrified in 1988. Electrification ends just north of the 545 km (339 mi) post (distance north of Wellington). A locomotive depot and marshalling yard incorporated the Racecourse station site. There is also a concrete sleeper factory at Te Rapa.

Aerial view of Te Rapa hump yard in 1972

==== Te Rapa Racecourse station ====
£720 was spent to open Te Rapa Racecourse passenger platform, near the south-west end of the course, on 15 October 1924. The mileage to the middle of the Racecourse platform was reported as 82 mi 57 ch (133.1 km) in 1924 (Frankton Jct was 83 mi 77 ch (135.1 km) from Auckland in 1882, but that station was moved north in 1909). The first excursions seem to have been advertised for Labour Day, 27 October 1924. The last advert was in November 1943. In 1930 the line was double tracked and equipped with automatic signalling. Associated with that work, footbridge No 62A was built in 1929 (it was removed about 1963) and 10 ch (200 m) long landings were formed at rail level on both lines, with access to the back of the racecourse. By January 1935 horse loading banks had been completed. Approval to remove them was given in 1953, after being disused for years. Final closure was in late 1967. Aerial photos show that the site of the station, and an area to the north, was later used for the marshalling yard and then the locomotive and freight depot.

Preceding station	Historical railways	Following station
Te Rapa; Line open Station reopened as Rotokauri in 2021; 3 km (1.9 mi)	North Island Main Trunk; New Zealand Railways Department now KiwiRail	Frankton Jct; Line open, Hamilton Station open 1 mi 20 ch (2.0 km)

==== Freight ====
On 1 April 2003 a container terminal opened, with overhead lines, for shunting by electric locomotives.

===== Crawford Street depot =====
Fonterra's Crawford St depot is linked by rail to local dairy factories at Te Awamutu, Morrinsville, Waitoa, Hautapu, Waharoa, Lichfield and Tīrau. It sends about 33,000 containers of milk powder and cheese a year for export via the Port of Tauranga. An automated cool store was added in 2009 to handle about 235,000 tonnes a year.

===== Te Rapa Marshalling Yard =====
Construction of a new marshalling yard near the Racecourse began in December 1967. The yard replaced Frankton goods yard and opened on 10 January 1971. It had a hump for shunting, which used Westinghouse retarders and 31 sidings.

== Education ==
Te Rapa School is a full primary school catering for years 1-8. It has 530 students. Te Rapa School has been the local primary school since 1906.

St Peter Chanel Catholic School is a state integrated full primary school catering for years 1-8. It has 283 students.

Both these schools are coeducational. Rolls are as of July 2026.
