= Ohinewai railway station =

Railway station in New Zealand

Ohinewai Railway Station
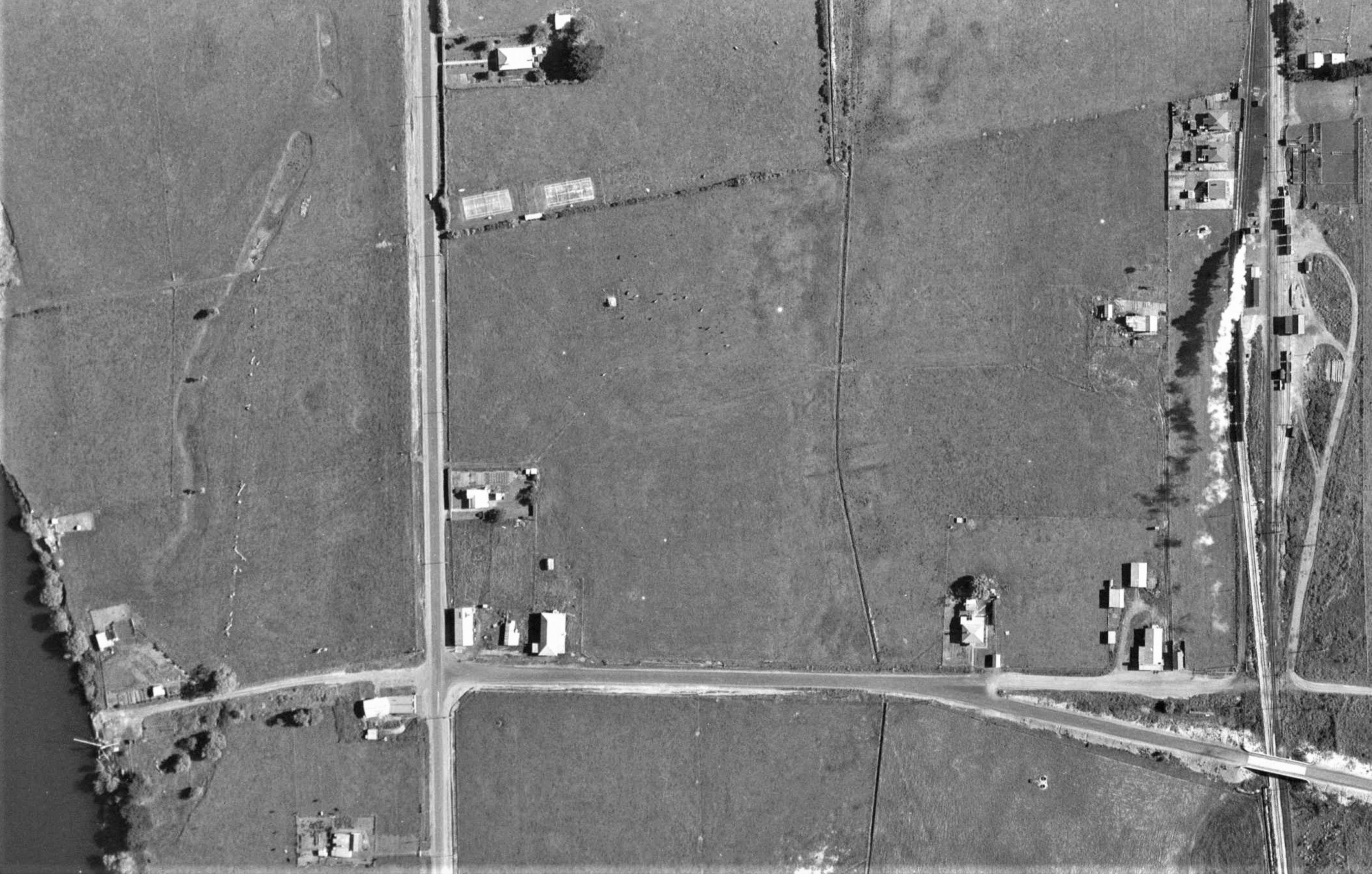
- 1940 aerial view of the Waikato River (left), Great South Rd at Ohinewai and Ohinewai railway station (right). The Waikato Expressway now runs through the centre

General information
- Location: Ohinewai; New Zealand
- Coordinates: 37°29′21″S 175°09′40″E
- Owner: KiwiRail Network
- Line: North Island Main Trunk
- Tracks: double track from 14 December 1958 to north from 27 August 1939 to south

History
- Opened: 13 August 1877
- Closed: 10 April 1965 passengers 31 December 1978 goods

Services
| Preceding station | Historical railways | Following station |
|---|---|---|
| Rangiriri; Line open, station closed | North Island Main Trunk; KiwiRail | Kimihia; Line open, station closed |
Location
- Location within New Zealand

Ohinewai Railway Station was a flag station on the North Island Main Trunk line, serving Ohinewai in the Waikato District of New Zealand, 59 mi (95 km) south of Auckland. It was 8.18 km (5.08 mi) north of Huntly, 7.26 km (4.51 mi) south of Rangiriri and 33 ft (10 m) above sea level. It was in the village, just north of Tahuna Rd.

== History ==
The station opened on 13 August 1877. The early service averaged about 13 mph (21 km/h), taking about 4hr 45 mins to Auckland, 15mins to Rangiriri and 23mins to Ruawaro (Huntly). A goods train took 1½hrs to Newcastle (Ngāruawāhia) and 1hr 17mins to Mercer, 3 days a week.

Tablet signalling was introduced in 1905.

In 1902 there were complaints of thefts due to lack of a caretaker. It seems one had been appointed by 1915, as a storeman at the station was killed at Gallipoli.

There was protest in 1925, when the only train which had allowed an Auckland day trip was withdrawn. The previous year the Great South Rd had metal added at Ohinewai, so that it could be used all year, and a bus started linking Ohinewai with Auckland, Morrinsville and Te Aroha in 1929. Ohinewai's rail service was so poor that a wartime plan, to connect the bus with trains at Ohinewai, had to be amended to meeting at Mercer instead.

Track doubling to ease congestion had been authorised in 1914, but work was delayed by the war. 300 men worked on doubling the track between Huntly and Ohinewai, which opened on 27 August 1939. To the north, doubling to Te Kauwhata didn't open until 14 December 1958.

In 1965 the station closed to passengers and on 31 December 1978 it closed completely.
