= Horotiu railway station =

Defunct railway station in New Zealand

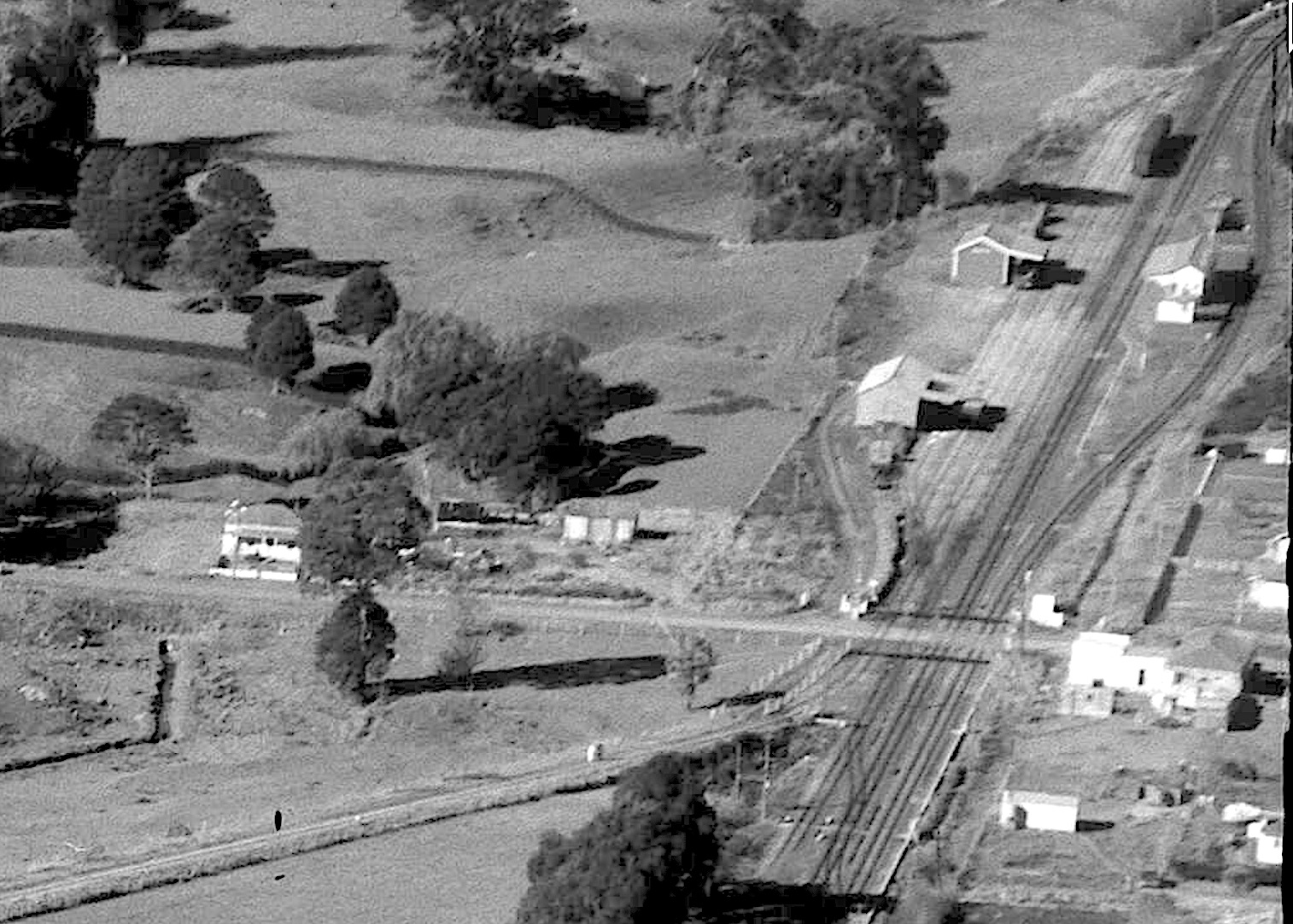
- 1959 view from north-west

General information
- Location: Horotiu Road; Horotiu New Zealand
- Coordinates: 37.701573°S 175.193802°E
- Line: North Island Main Trunk

History
- Opened: 19 December 1877
- Closed: 1975
- Former names: Pukete
Location

Horotiu railway station was a station on the North Island Main Trunk in New Zealand serving Horotiu.

Preceding station	Historical railways	Following station
Ngaruawahia; Line open, station closed	North Island Main Trunk; New Zealand Railways Department	Te Rapa; Line open, station closed

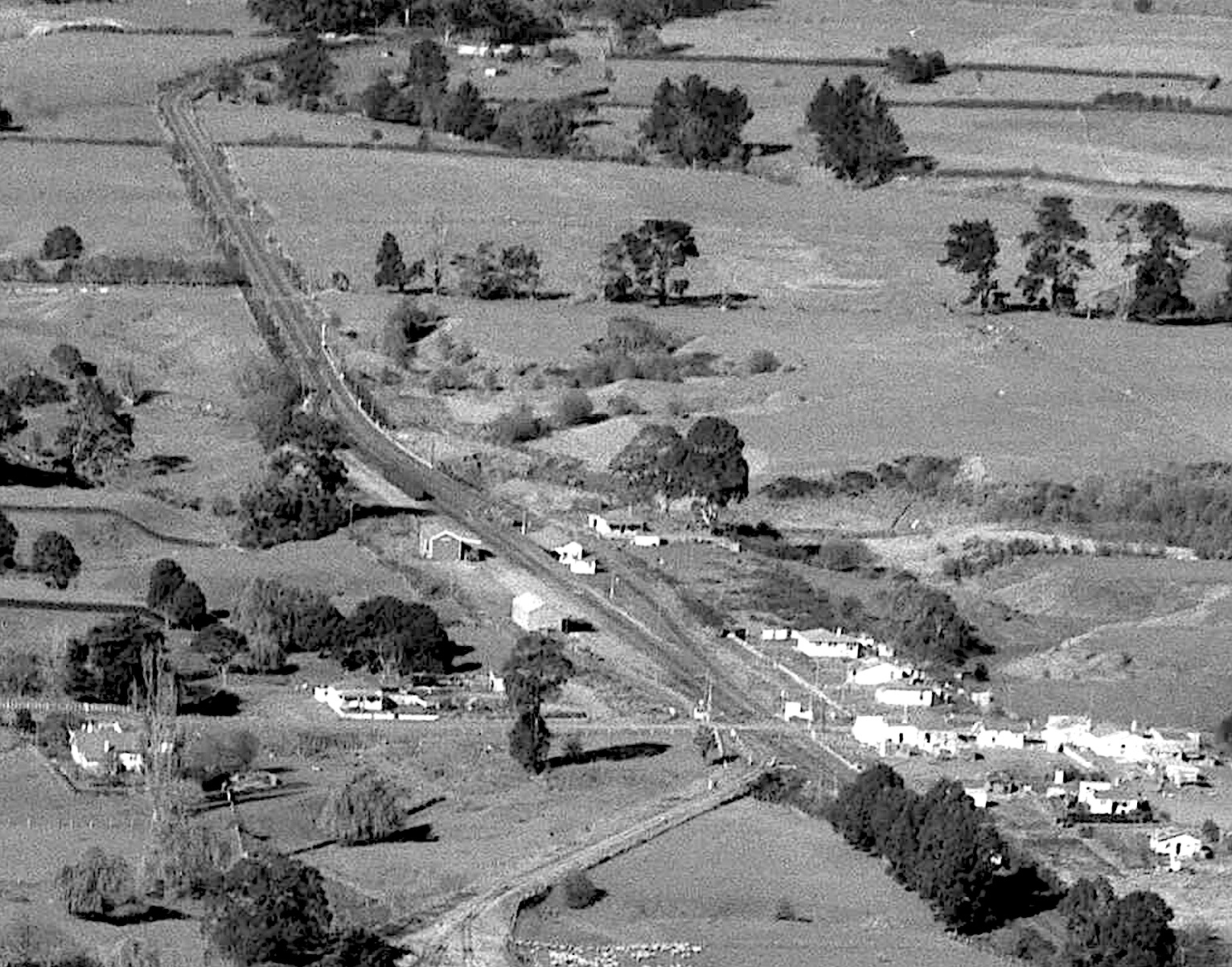
1959 view from north AFFCO siding to bottom left

It was a 'flag station', originally 3 mi (4.8 km) north of Te Rapa and 4 mi (6.4 km) south of Ngāruawāhia and named Pukete. The station was moved just over a mile to the north in 1880, to be 76 mi (122 km) from Auckland. It seems no explanation was given for the controversial move. The station changed its name from Pukete to Horotiu on 23 June 1907.

Traffic remained light, amounting to £49 in 1901. It was converted to a switch-out station in 1909, equipped with distant signals in 1916, when the AFFCO sidings opened, and had other alterations to signalling and interlocking in 1934, with extension of automatic signalling from Mercer to Frankton. In 1930 Frankton to Horotiu (6 mi 55 ch (10.8 km)) was double tracked, with automatic signalling also extended 34 mi 72 ch (56.2 km) to Mercer. Horotiu's power interlocking was the first automatic operation of main line points in the country, replacing home and distant signals, Wood's locks (a single key for signal and facing points, named after S P Woods of McKenzie and Holland) and the tablet station. The 3 mi 54 ch (5.9 km) north to Ngāruawāhia was double track from 5 December 1937.

== Accidents ==
In 1916 a goods trains collided with wagons.
