= Ohinewai =

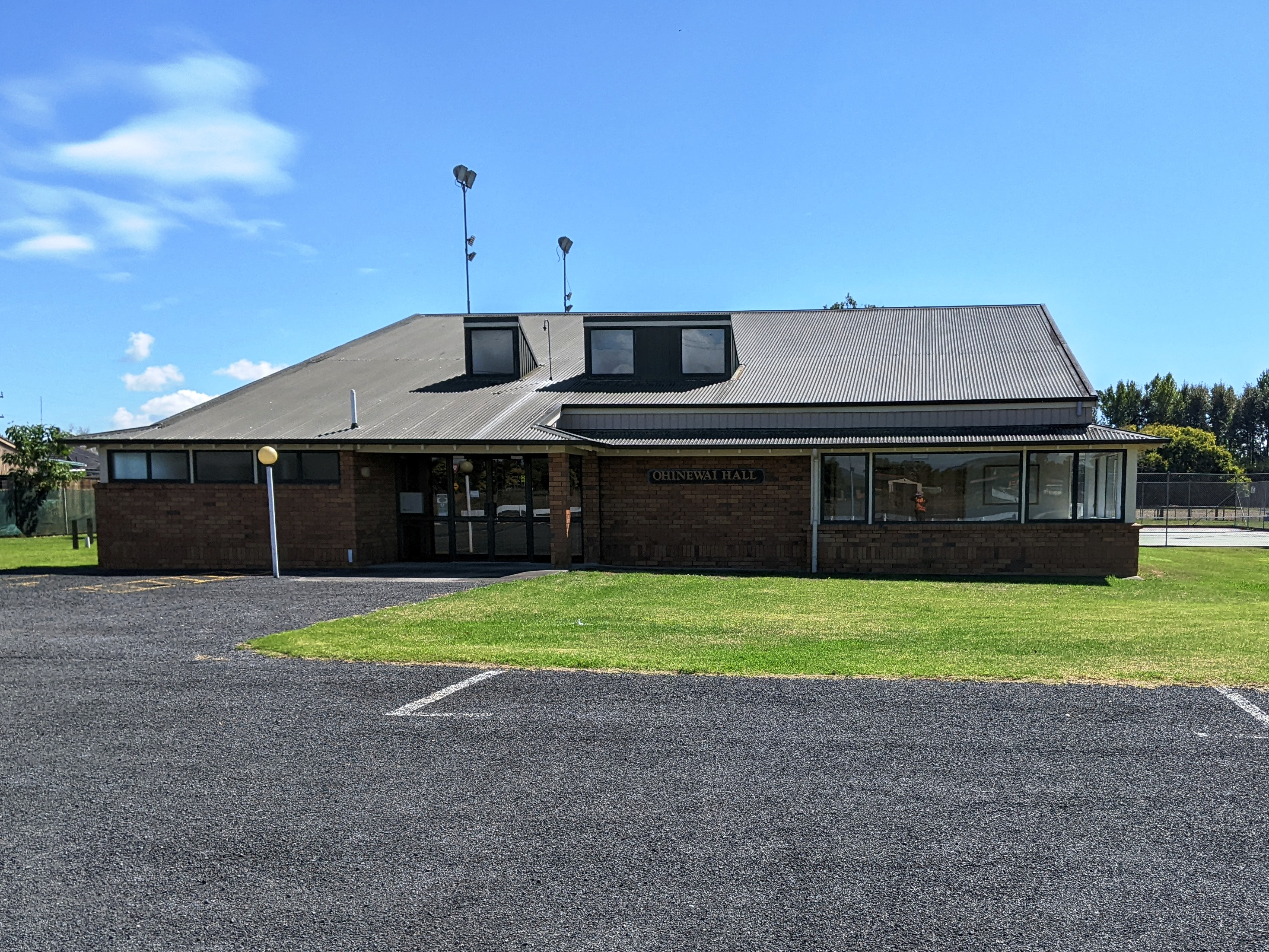
- Ohinewai community hall
- Interactive map of Ohinewai
- Coordinates: 37°29′20″S 175°09′20″E
- Country: New Zealand
- Region: Waikato
- Territorial authority: Waikato District
- Ward: Huntly General Ward; Tai Raro Takiwaa Maaori Ward
- Electorates: Waikato; Hauraki-Waikato (Māori)

Government
  - Territorial Authority: Waikato District Council
  - Regional council: Waikato Regional Council
  - Mayor of Waikato: Aksel Bech
  - Waikato MP: Tim van de Molen
  - Hauraki-Waikato MP: Hana-Rawhiti Maipi-Clarke

Area
  - Total: 27.68 km^{2} (10.69 sq mi)

Population (2023 census)
  - Total: 159
- Postcode(s): 3784

Ohinewai (Māori: Ōhinewai) is a small settlement in the Waikato Region, in New Zealand. It is located on the east bank of the Waikato River on SH1, 9 km (5.6 mi) north of Huntly.

The name Ohinewai is Māori for 'girl's water place' (o 'place of', hine 'girl', wai 'water'), or, more likely, 'place of Hinewai', Hinewai being a female personal name.

In July 2019, bed manufacturer Comfort Group announced its intention to create an affordable housing estate in Ohinewai. It has purchased 176 ha (430 acres) of land with the intention of developing 1100 homes.

== Demographics ==
Ohinewai covers 27.68 km^{2} (10.69 sq mi). It is part of the larger Huntly Rural statistical area.

Historical population
Year	Pop.	±% p.a.
2006	159	—
2013	159	+0.00%
2018	162	+0.37%
2023	159	−0.37%
The 2006 population is for a smaller area of 27.09 km^{2}. Source:

Ohinewai had a population of 159 in the 2023 New Zealand census, a decrease of 3 people (−1.9%) since the 2018 census, and unchanged since the 2013 census. There were 81 males and 84 females in 57 dwellings. There were 33 people (20.8%) aged under 15 years, 30 (18.9%) aged 15 to 29, 72 (45.3%) aged 30 to 64, and 30 (18.9%) aged 65 or older.

People could identify as more than one ethnicity. The results were 77.4% European (Pākehā), 37.7% Māori, 1.9% Pasifika, 3.8% Asian, and 3.8% other, which includes people giving their ethnicity as "New Zealander". English was spoken by 96.2%, Māori language by 7.5%, and other languages by 5.7%. No language could be spoken by 3.8% (e.g. too young to talk). The percentage of people born overseas was 7.5, compared with 28.8% nationally.

Religious affiliations were 20.8% Christian, 3.8% Māori religious beliefs, and 3.8% other religions. People who answered that they had no religion were 67.9%, and 7.5% of people did not answer the census question.

Of those at least 15 years old, 12 (9.5%) people had a bachelor's or higher degree, 66 (52.4%) had a post-high school certificate or diploma, and 39 (31.0%) people exclusively held high school qualifications. 12 people (9.5%) earned over $100,000 compared to 12.1% nationally. The employment status of those at least 15 was that 66 (52.4%) people were employed full-time, 21 (16.7%) were part-time, and 3 (2.4%) were unemployed.

== Marae ==
The local marae, Matahuru Papakainga, is a traditional meeting ground for the Waikato Tainui hapū of Ngāti Makirangi, Ngāti Mahuta and Ngāti Naho, and the Ngāpuhi hapū of Ngāti Hine.

In October 2020, the Government committed $2,584,751 from the Provincial Growth Fund to upgrade the marae and seven other Waikato Tainui marae, creating 40 jobs.

== Education ==
Ohinewai School is a co-educational state primary school for Year 1 to 8 students, with a roll of 130 as of July 2026. It first opened in 1882.

== See also ==
Ohinewai railway station
