= Taupiri railway station =

Defunct railway station in New Zealand

Taupiri
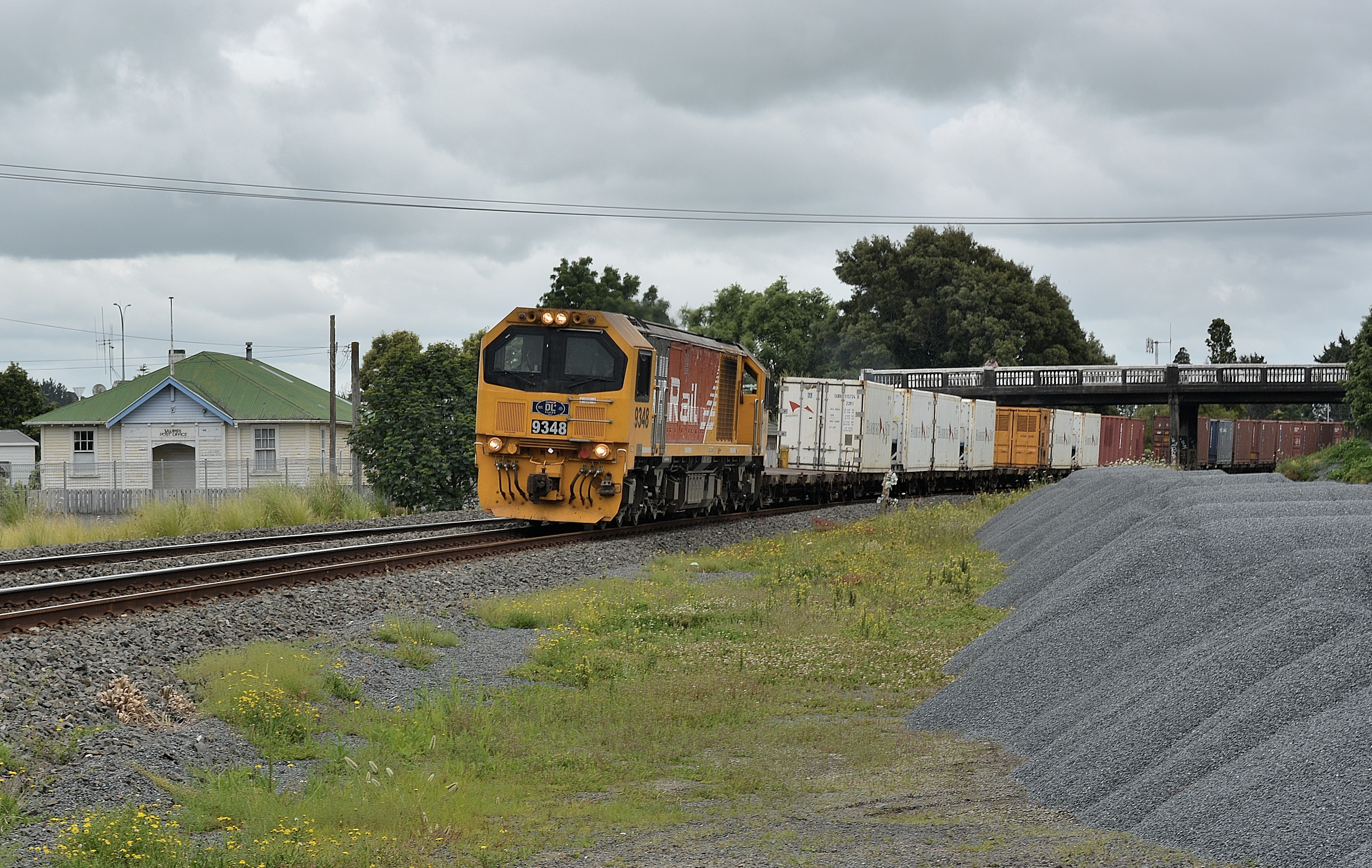
- DL9348 passing site of Taupiri station in 2014

General information
- Location: Railway Road; Taupiri New Zealand
- Coordinates: 37°36′46″S 175°11′22″E
- Owner: KiwiRail
- Line: North Island Main Trunk
- Tracks: 2

History
- Opened: 19 December 1877
- Closed: 3 October 1982 (to passengers before 1976)

Services
Preceding station	Historical railways	Following station
Huntly; Line open, station open 7.31 km (4.54 mi)	North Island Main Trunk; KiwiRail	Ngāruawāhia; Line open, station closed 7.39 km (4.59 mi)
Location

Taupiri was a station on the North Island Main Trunk line with a goods shed and an island platform, serving the small settlement of Taupiri in the Waikato District of New Zealand.

A stationmaster's house and telegraph office were added in 1882 and a goods shed at about the same time. There were protests when the stationmaster was withdrawn in 1895 and the station was reduced to a flag station, though still staffed. In 1901 this resulted in a case of calves being left at the station.

Traffic grew as shown in the graph and table below.

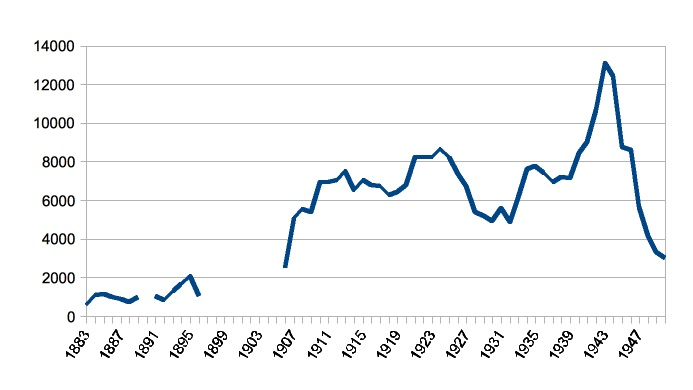
tickets sales 1883-1896 and 1906-1950 - derived from annual returns to Parliament of "Statement of Revenue for each Station for the Year ended"

year	tickets	season tickets	staff	ref.
1883	571		1	
1884	1,100		1	
1885	1,156		1	
1886	976		1	
1887	880		1	
1888	730		1	
1889	998		1	
1890				
1891	1,042		1	
1892	807		1	
1893	1,317		1	
1894	1,658		1	
1895	2,054		1	
1896	1,052	Closed 1 Mar		
1906	2,495	4	1	
1907	5,081	18	1	
1908	5,515	16	2	
1909	5,399	9	2	
1910	6,959	14	2	
1911	6,962	15	2	
1912	7,019	16	2	
1913	7,511	12	3	
1914	6,523			
1915	7,033	10		
1916	6,801	24		
1917	6,741	6		
1918	6,270	9		
1919	6,436	28		
1920	6,791	155		
1921	8,217	177		
1922	8,209	174		
1923	8,242	165		
1924	8,661	135		
1925	8,244	94		
1926	7,333	114		
1927	6,727	47		
1928	5,383	36		
1929	5,159	36		
1930	4,906	45		
1931	5,585	66		
1932	4,864	100		
1933	6,106	136		
1934	7,597	151		
1935	7,759	150		
1936	7,411	144		
1937	6,914	143		
1938	7,193	135		
1939	7,121	162		
1940	8,415	173		
1941	9,019	166		
1942	10,673	190		
1943	13,097	118		
1944	12,404	132		
1945	8,746	134		
1946	8,615	100		
1947	5,660	68		
1948	4,118	86		
1949	3,314	120		
1950	2,981	52		

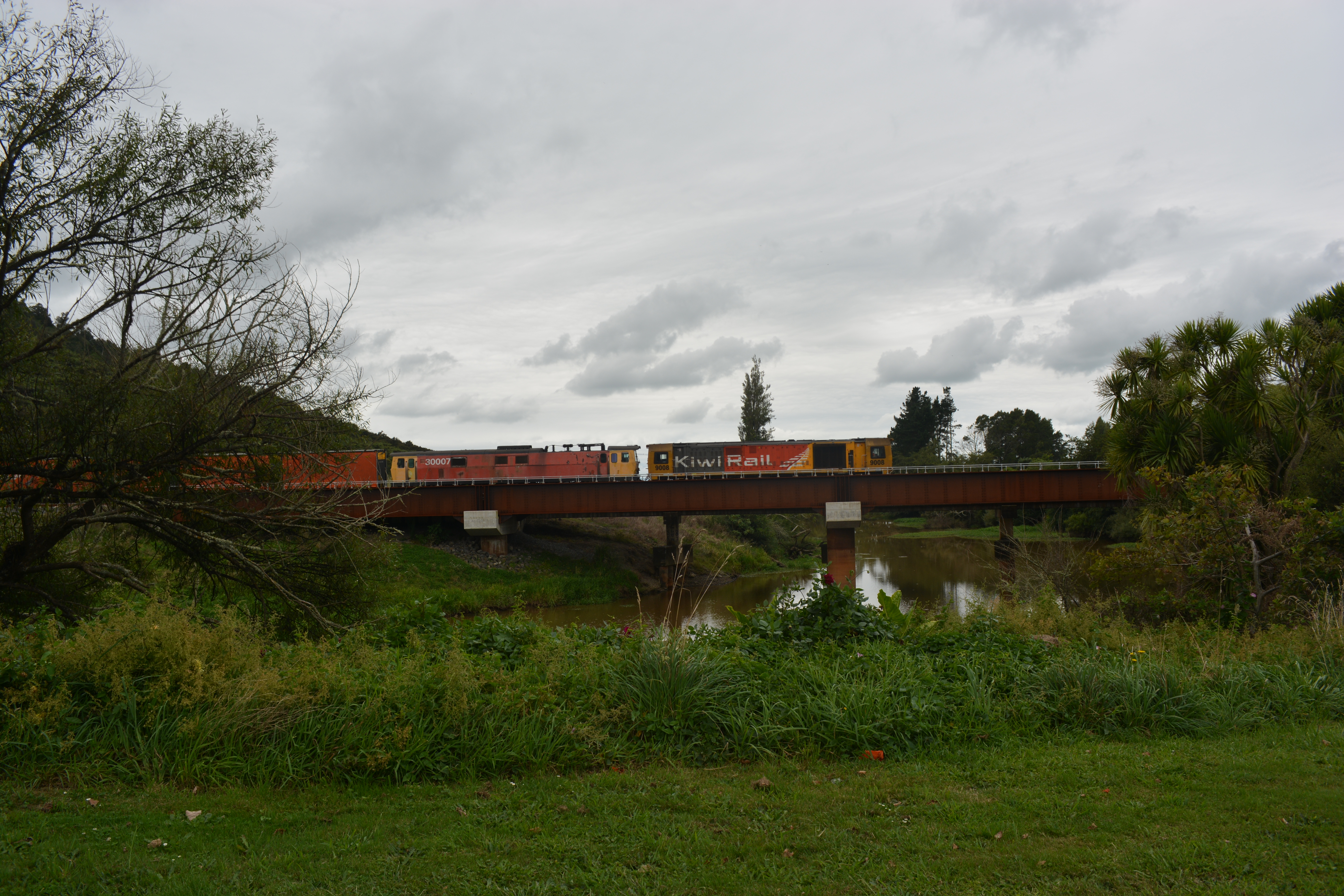
KiwiRail Ef30007 & Dl9008 Heading South (32916109770)

== Mangawara Bridges 272 and 273 ==
Wooden trestle bridge 57 was built in 1877 to cross the Mangawara Stream, just north of Taupiri. When the line was doubled in 1938, bridges 272 and 273 were built alongside. 273 (east) was replaced from 2015 and 272 (west) upgraded. The replacement used 390 tonnes of steel in two 24m girders connected to 5.5m cross beams. The bridge was the last of 8 bridge upgrades to increase line capacity.
