= Ngāruawāhia railway station =

Railway station in New Zealand

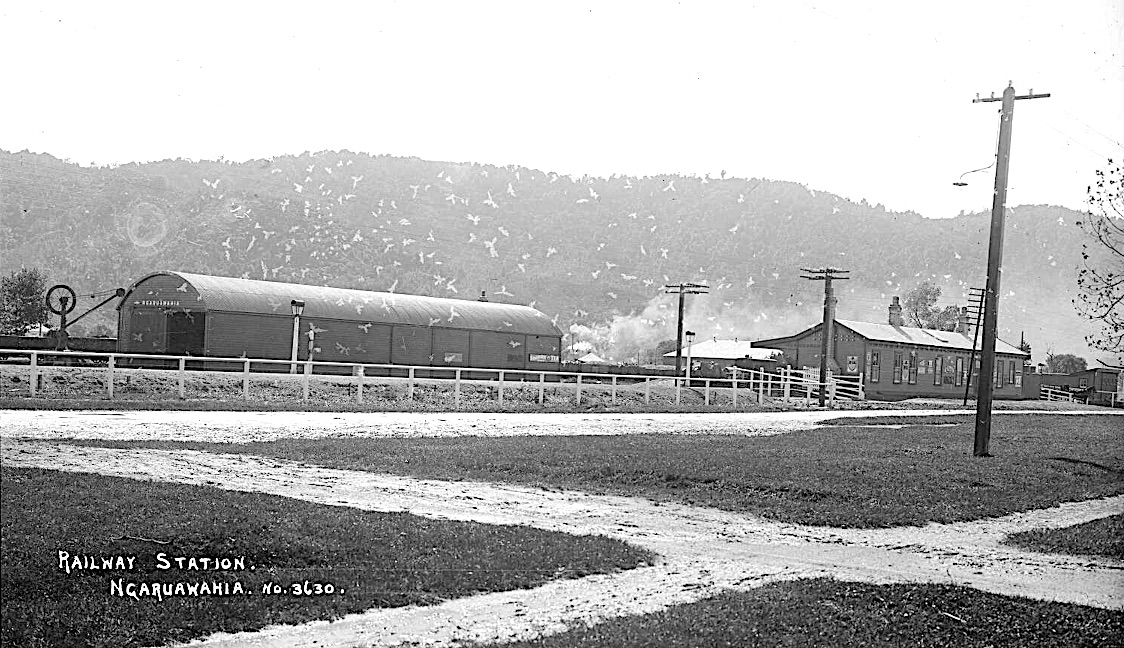

General information
- Location: Great S Road, Ngāruawāhia; New Zealand
- Coordinates: 37°40′05.9″S 175°08′56.1″E
- Elevation: 21 m (69 ft)
- Owner: KiwiRail
- Distance: Wellington 559.06 km (347.38 mi)
- Tracks: double track from 4 December 1938

History
- Opened: 13 August 1877
- Closed: 29 July 1978 (goods), 1975 (passengers)
- Former names: Newcastle until 1878

Services
Preceding station	Historical railways	Following station
Taupiri; Line open, station closed 7.39 km (4.59 mi)	North Island Main Trunk; KiwiRail	Horotiu; Line open, station open 5.52 km (3.43 mi)
Location

Ngāruawāhia railway station was at the junction of the North Island Main Trunk line and its Glen Massey branch, serving Ngāruawāhia in the Waikato District of New Zealand, 74 mi (119 km) south of Auckland and 10 mi (16 km) north of Hamilton. It was opened with a special train from Auckland on Monday 13 August 1877. The next stations were Taupiri 6.5 km (4.0 mi) to the north and Horotiu 5.5 km (3.4 mi) to the south.

In 2020 reopening of the remaining platform was put forward as a scheme to help the region recover from the economic impacts of the COVID-19 pandemic, estimated to cost $15m.

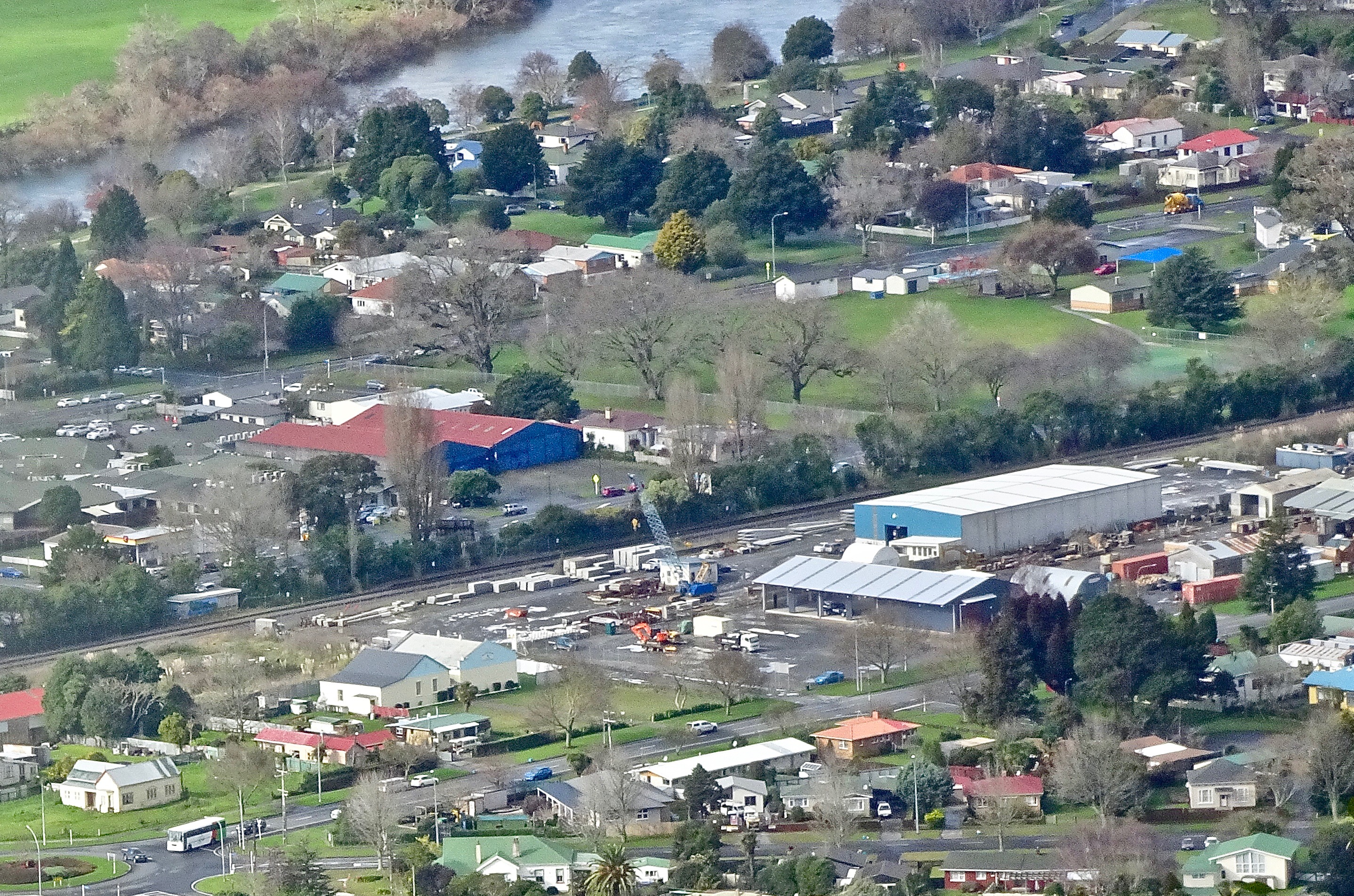
Station site viewed from Hakarimata Range in 2017

== History ==
The station opened on 13 August 1877, as Newcastle, when the line was extended 31 mi (50 km) from the previous terminus at Mercer, though the stationmaster's house was added later. It ceased to be the terminus when the line was extended to Te Awamutu on 1 July 1880. The name was changed in 1878. Two months after opening, a platform was built opposite the Delta Hotel in the town centre, though the goods shed remained to the south.

The 1902 edition of The Cyclopedia of New Zealand described the station as wooden, with an asphalt platform, goods shed, lamp and luggage rooms, a ladies' room, public waiting room, stationmaster's office and a post office. A new station was reported as open in 1915, though in 1916 the station was reported as "rearranged considerably", which seems to have been when it was moved to about halfway between the hotel and the goods shed. Electric lights were installed in 1921.

Traffic grew steadily (see graph and table below). The greatest increase was at the start of World War 2, presumably consisting largely of soldiers and relatives travelling to and from Hopuhopu camp.

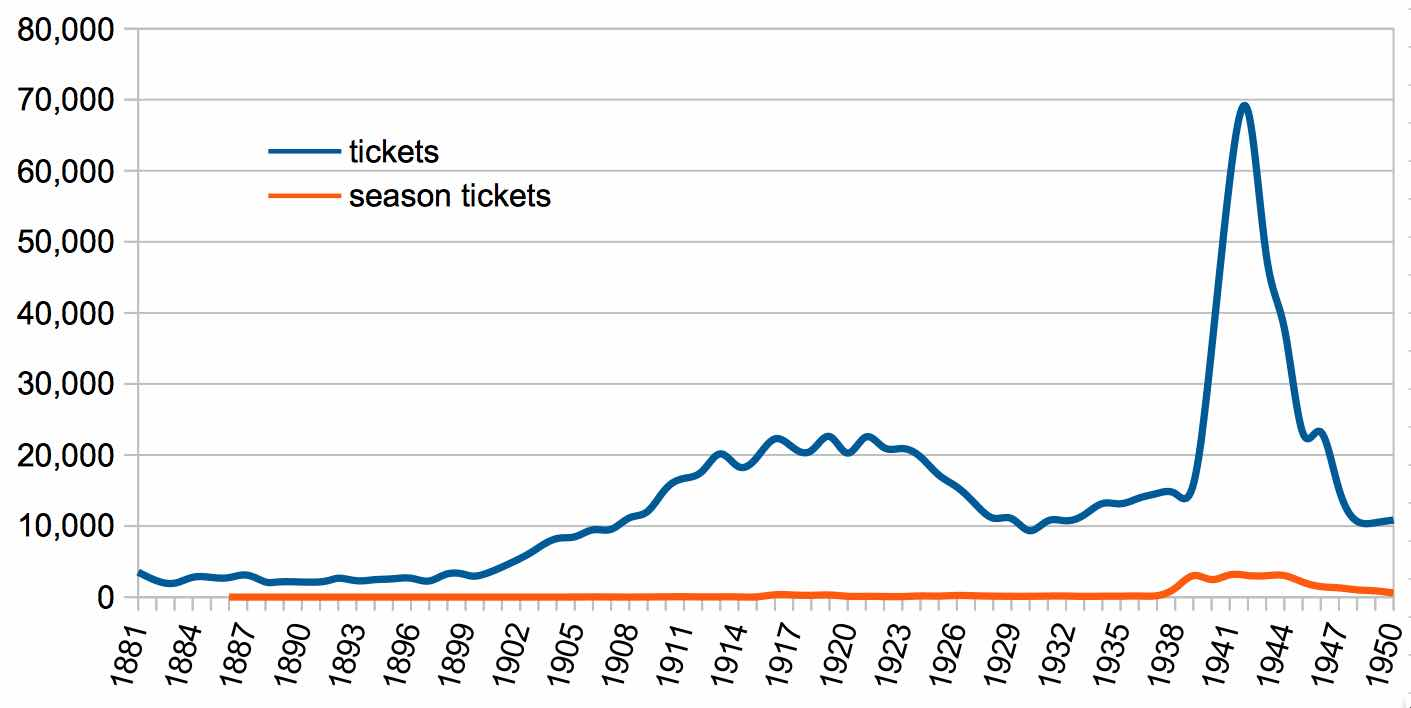
tickets and season tickets sold at Ngāruawāhia 1881–1950 (derived from figures in table).

year	tickets	season tickets	staff
1881	3,535		2
1882	2,321		2
1883	1,960		2
1884	2,787		2
1885	2,783		2
1886	2,745	2	2
1887	3,093	2	2
1888	2,131	2	3
1889	2,165	2	2
1890			
1891	2,142		3
1892	2,654		3
1893	2,309		4
1894	2,450		3
1895	2,574		3
1896	2,653		3
1897	2,274		3
1898	3,273		3
1899	3,158		3
1900	3,210		3
1901			
1902	5,442		3
1903	6,951	1	3
1904	8,230	4	3
1905	8,487	16	3
1906	9,469	30	4
1907	9,542	18	3
1908	11,146	9	4
1909	12,053	24	5
1910	15,239	45	4
1911	16,705	52	5
1912	17,697	31	6
1913	20,164	37	8
1914	18,354	33	
1915	19,620	36	
1916	22,270	327	
1917	21,029	296	
1918	20,608	254	
1919	22,606	300	
1920	20,266	118	
1921	22,535	106	
1922	21,032	83	
1923	20,909	76	
1924	19,737	165	
1925	17,197	147	
1926	15,504	229	
1927	13,143	184	
1928	11,113	141	
1929	11,061	115	
1930	9,346	117	
1931	10,731	147	
1932	10,742	151	
1933	11,579	102	
1934	13,171	129	
1935	13,137	132	
1936	13,927	156	
1937	14,581	199	
1938	14,576	1,252	
1939	15,879	3,016	
1940	34,839	2,469	
1941	58,643	3,131	
1942	68,419	3,039	
1943	48,246	3,010	
1944	37,802	3,032	
1945	23,207	2,120	
1946	23,252	1,481	
1947	15,198	1,304	
1948	10,675	1,021	
1949	10,471	877	
1950	10,844	574	

== Waikato River Bridges ==
=== 1877 road-rail bridge ===
Work started on a road rail bridge over the Waikato River, with three 120 ft (37 m) spans late in 1874, with pile driving started on 18 January 1875. Cylinders for the piers were delivered in 1875 and the first was put in place on 24 June 1875. The bridge was said to be near completion in April 1876, and a test train was run over it and it opened for road traffic in December 1876. However, it wasn't reported as finished until 1877, the year of a permanent way contract for the 30 miles from Mercer for £16,832. The bridge, like the station, opened for rail traffic on 13 August 1877.

Gates, controlled from the bridgekeeper's house, kept road traffic off the bridge when trains were due. Although it was planned to demolish the house in 1929, it survived until the bridge was demolished in 1968.

=== 1931 rail bridge ===
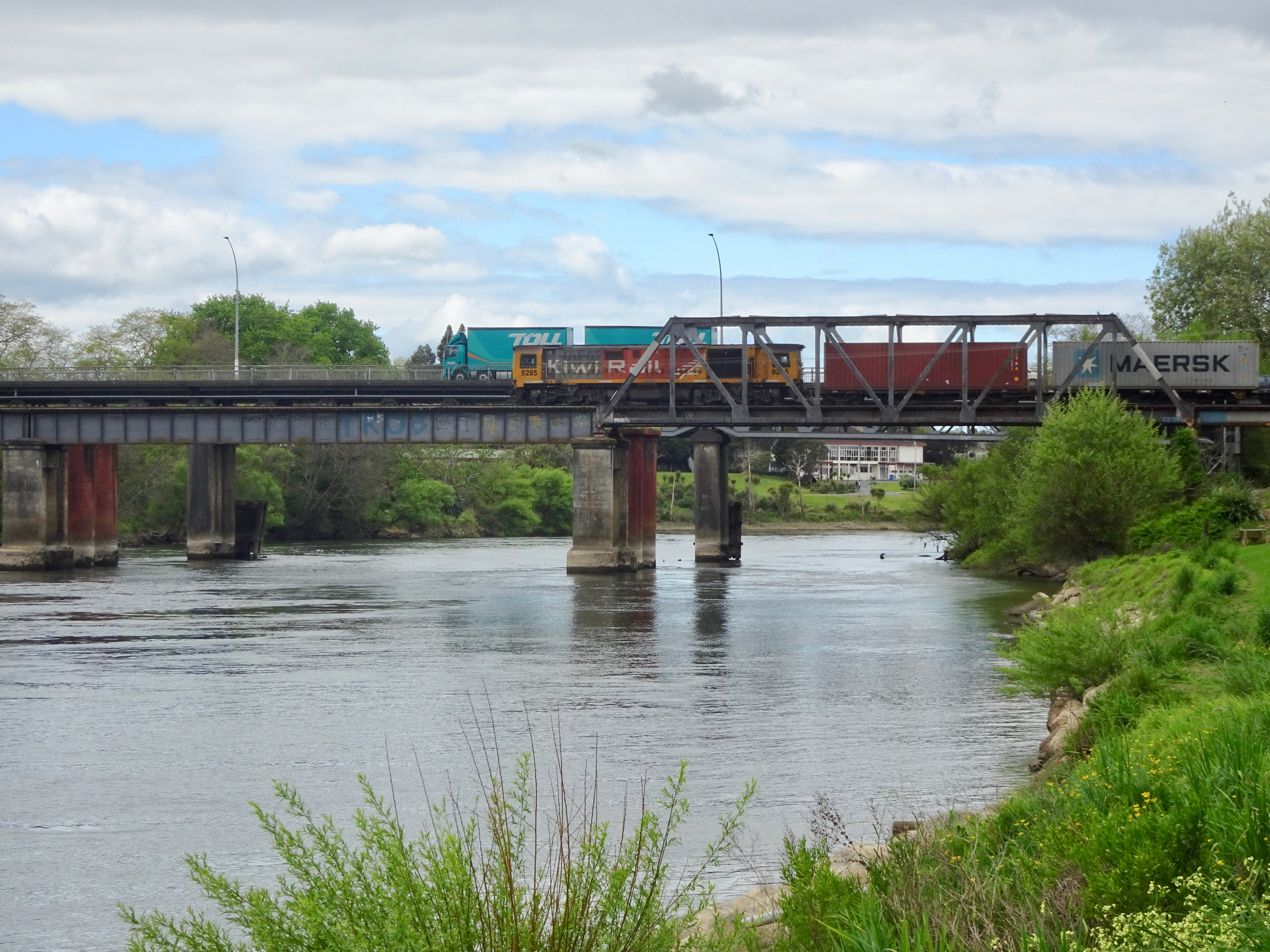
Class DL 9285 with a northbound freight on Ngāruawāhia railway bridge with a Toll truck on the road bridge. Tūrangawaewae is in the background.

In 1928 it was decided to replace the 1877 bridge, as it needed repair. The new bridge was 35 ft (11 m) downstream, had 6 spans, 3 x 117 ft (36 m) steel Pratt trusses, 2 x 38 ft (12 m) and 1 x 24 ft (7.3 m) plate girders, a total of 451 ft (137 m). It rests on concrete piers up to 70 ft (21 m) deep. It was designed by NZR, using over 253 tons of steel (or 255 tons). It was made in Britain, fabricated by A & G Price and cost £25,000. The last rivet was driven in February, the first train crossed the bridge on 13 March and by November 1931 the old bridge was being used for northbound road traffic. At that time it was expected that the old bridge would be refurbished for rail use when the track was doubled, so it was leased to the Main Highways Board.

==== 1974 crash ====
21 wagons of a southbound train derailed and piled up on the northernmost truss of the bridge after an axle broke on 14 July 1974.

==== 2002 repair ====
On 14 March 1998 part of train 235 hit the 1931 bridge, requiring the replacement of 2 of the trusses with 2 x 36 m (118 ft) beams in 2001/2 by McConnell Smith.

== Gallery ==
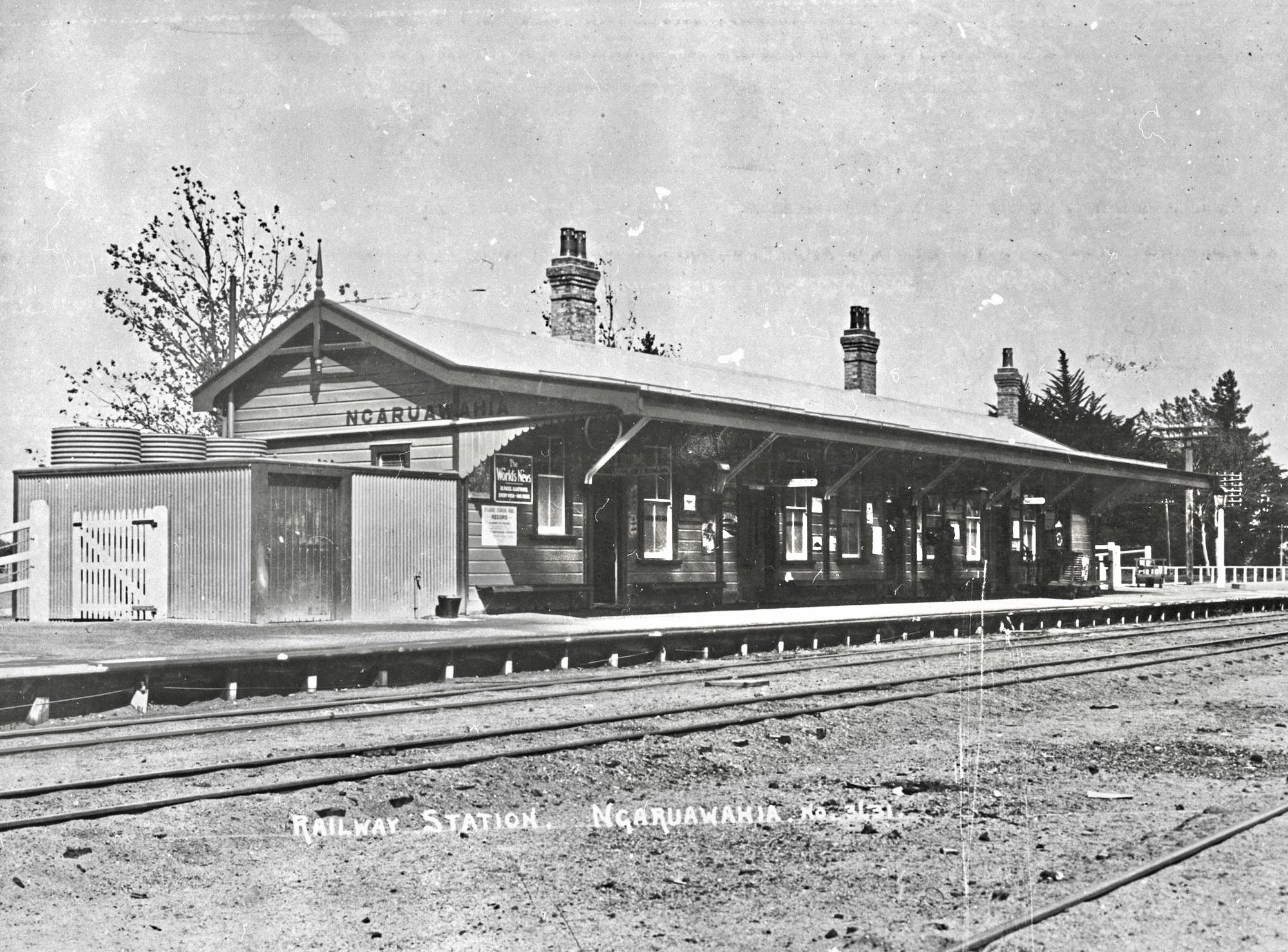
Ngaruawahia railway station in 1914

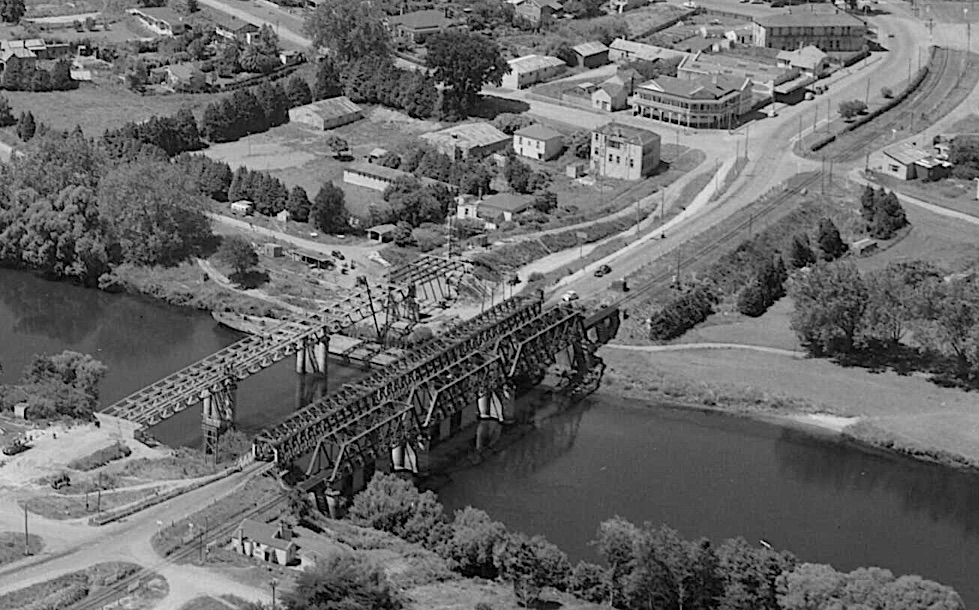
1931 railway bridge and 1956 road bridge being built

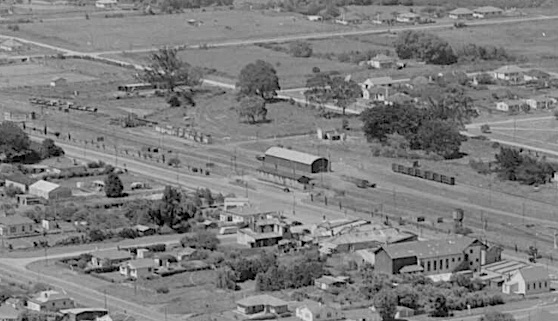
1955 view from north

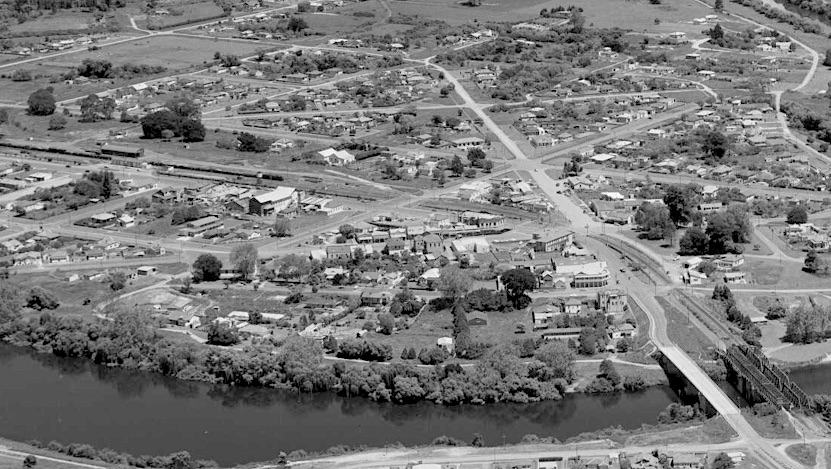
1959 view from north

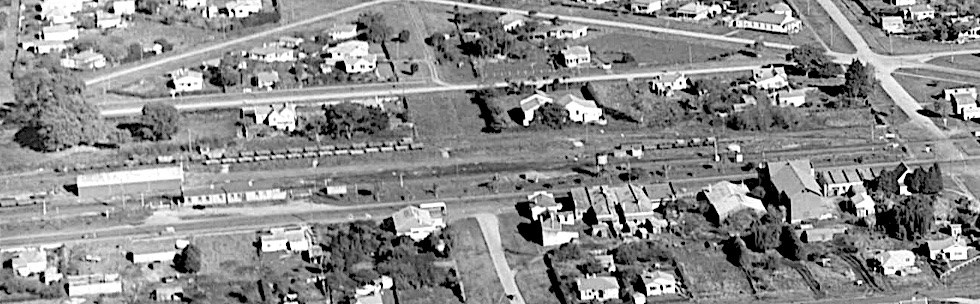
1951 view from north east

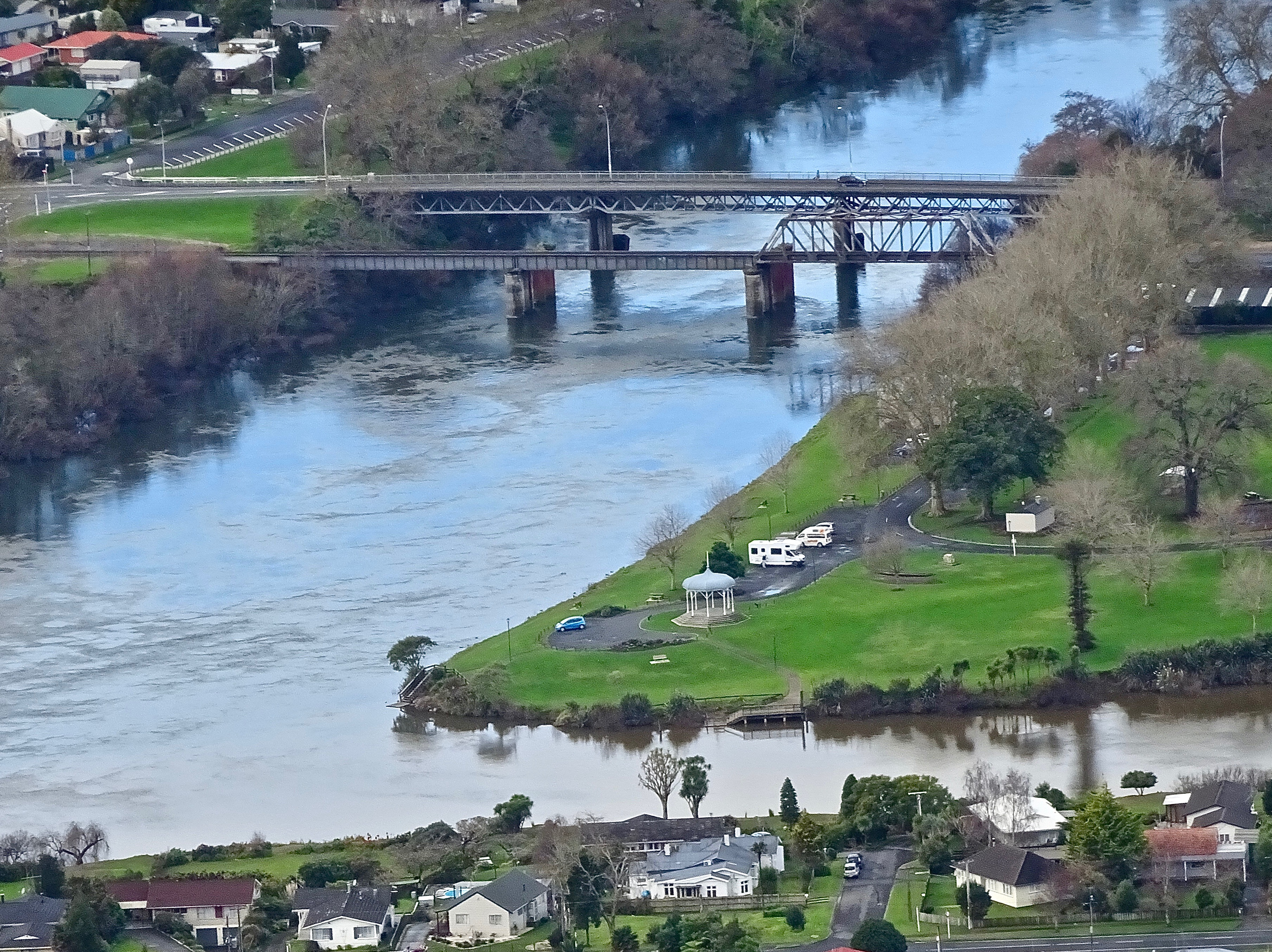
1931 rail bridge and 1956 road bridge
