= Kiwi Property Group =

New Zealand NZX-listed company

- Trade name: Kiwi Property Group
- Type: Public
- Industry: Real estate
- Founded: 1992
- Headquarters: Auckland, New Zealand
- Area served: New Zealand
- Key people: CEO: Clive Mackenzie Chair: Simon Shakesheff
- Revenue: $184.6m (2024)
- Total assets: $3.2b (2024)
- Number of employees: 160 (2024)
- Website: www.kp.co.nz

Kiwi Property Group is one of New Zealand's largest NZX-listed property companies and the owner, and manager of a range of mixed-use, office, retail and build-to-rent assets including Sylvia Park, The Base, the Vero Centre and Resido.

== History ==
=== 1990s ===
Kiwi Property was established in 1992 as the Kiwi Income Property Trust as a property trust by Ross Green and Richard Didsbury, and listed on the New Zealand Exchange in 1993 under the ticker code of KIP.

Kiwi Income Property Trust acquired New Zealand Land Limited in 1994; which held a total portfolio of nine properties.

In 1995, the business purchased 11.8 hectares of land in a 'brown zone' area, Mt. Wellington, for $9.75 million and spent a further $20 million in 1999 to acquire a neighbouring 9.1 hectare site.

Kiwi Income Property Trust divested a 50% shareholding in its management company to Lendlease in 1998.

=== 2000s ===
In 2001, a strategic move led the trust to acquire Kiwi Development Trust, the developers and managers of the Royal & Sun Alliance Building, which is now known as the Vero Centre.

In 2002, Colonial First State acquired a 100% shareholding in the management company of Kiwi Income Property Trust, making it a wholly owned subsidiary.

The Sylvia Park Shopping Centre was complete in 2007.

=== 2010s ===
Kiwi Income Property Trust had two Christchurch assets, both of which were heavily impacted by the 2011 Christchurch earthquake, resulting in the seismic remediation of the Northlands Shopping Centre and demolition of the PricewaterhouseCoopers Tower.

Kiwi Income developed ASB North Wharf, the New Zealand headquarters for ASB Bank, with Fletcher Construction completing the project in 2013.

In 2013 a consortium of investors purchased all Kiwi Income shares from Colonial First State leading to a successful vote on 5 December 2014 to rebrand the organisation as Kiwi Property Group, register it as a New Zealand company (rather than a trust) and change its NZX ticker code to NZX: KPG.

In September 2015, Kiwi Property announced the purchase of Westgate Lifestyle, a shopping complex located in Westgate for $82.5 million. It was also reported that they entered into a joint-venture with Tainui Group Holdings to own and manage 50% of The Base in Hamilton for $192.5 Million.

In October 2017 a deal was signed by Kiwi Property and Meridian Energy to install hundreds of roof top solar panels to harness renewable energy at four of its shopping malls namely Auckland's LynnMall, Hamilton's The Base, Palmerston North's The Plaza and Christchurch's Northlands.

Kiwi Property sold the Majestic Centre in Wellington to Investec Property for $123.2 million in November 2017 and North City Shopping Centre in Wellington to a private investor for $100 million in April 2018 as part of its capital recycling programme.

In 2019, the company opened ANZ Raranga, the first office building at Sylvia Park marking an important milestone in the site's mixed-use evolution. ANZ and IAG were anchor tenants of the 10,000 square metre, 10-level tower.

=== 2020s ===
In October 2020 Kiwi Property opened the $277 million galleria level expansion at Sylvia Park, featuring an additional 20,000 square metres of retail space, 50 new stores and The Terrace dining precinct.

Almost a year later, in September 2021, the company began construction of Resido, a 295 apartment build-to-rent development on the northern border of Sylvia Park. The move signalled Kiwi Property's first foray into residential accommodation and according to CEO, Clive Mackenzie, was intended to diversify its asset base, increase asset values and attract more people to the site. Resido was opened by New Zealand Prime Minister, Christopher Luxon, on 11 June 2024.

Kiwi Property completed the sale of Northlands Shopping Centre to Mackersy Property for $151 million in November 2022 and in May 2023, the company divested the Westage Lifestyle Shopping Centre.

In March 2023, Kiwi Property opened 3 Te Kehu Way, a $63 million low rise office and medical office, anchored by Geneva Finance and ASB.

== Business overview ==
Kiwi Property owns properties across a range of asset classes including mixed-use, office and retail.

Division	No. of Assets	Net Lettable Area (sqm)	No. of Tenants	Valuation (millions)
Mixed-use	4	290,375	570	$2,100
Office	3	85,822	63	$816
Retail	2	51,908	173	$144

== Mixed-use ==
=== Sylvia Park ===
Sylvia Park is a large shopping centre and mixed-use precinct in the Auckland suburb of Mount Wellington, New Zealand. The area around the precinct (which includes some residential and other commercial developments) is also widely referred to Sylvia Park and is located adjacent to two major interchanges of the Auckland Southern Motorway – the South-Eastern Highway (which passes directly through the shopping centre on a viaduct) and Mount Wellington Highway.

The Sylvia Park Precinct is made up of:

- Sylvia Park Shopping Centre: New Zealand's largest shopping centre featuring a wide variety of major retailers including The Warehouse Group, Hoyts, H&M, Zara, Kmart, Mecca, as well as the Pak'nSave supermarket. The centre employs approximately 2,500 staff, and recorded 15.8 million customers visits and almost $860 million in sales the 2024 financial year.
- Sylvia Park Lifestyle: Kiwi Income purchased the Apex Mega Centre located opposite the existing Sylvia Park Shopping in December 2014 for $64 million. After the purchase, Apex Mega was rebranded as Sylvia Park Lifestyle and was subsequently integrated into the Sylvia Park precinct.
- ANZ Raranga: was completed in December 2018, becoming the first office tower at Sylvia Park and marking an important step in precinct's transition to a mixed-use property. Key tenants include ANZ and IAG. The building has 5 Green Star Office Design Rating and a 5.5 Star NABERSNZ Rating.
- 3 Te Kehu Way: is a multi-use office and medical building which officially opened fin March 2023. The building has strong sustainability credentials, earning New Zealand's first 6-Green Star Design & As Built NZ v1.0 Built rating.
- Resido: New Zealand's largest build-to-rent residential complex at the time of opening on 11 June 2024, Resido features 295 apartments and amenities such as gym, rooftop barbeque area and co-working facilities. Kiwi Property has announced plans to become one of the country's leading build-to-rent owners and operators, with potential to construct up to 1,200 apartments at Sylvia Park and 600 at LynnMall.

=== LynnMall ===
New Zealand's first shopping centre, LynnMall, has been serving Auckland's western suburbs since opening in 1963. The centre has continued to evolve and is undergoing redevelopment. LynnMall was acquired by Kiwi Property in early December 2010 from AMP Capital Property for $174 million. LynnMall underwent a $50 million renovation in 2013 and further expansion commenced in January 2015 at a cost of $39 million.

=== The Base ===
The Base is New Zealand's second largest shopping centre and incorporates Te Awa specialty shopping mall and a substantial large format retail precinct. The Base is owned in a 50:50 joint venture between Kiwi Property and Tainui Group Holdings. The Base generated over $530 million in sales in the 2024 financial year.

Kiwi Property Mixed-use Property Portfolio
Property	Year of Ownership	Location	NLA (sqm)	No. of Tenants	Valuation (millions)	Notes
Sylvia Shopping Centre	2007	Auckland	94,261	235	$1,025.0	
Sylvia Park Lifestyle	2011	Auckland	16,578	16	$86.0	
3 Te Kehu Way	2023	Auckland	7,269	12	$60.0	
ANZ Raranga	2018	Auckland	11,620	4	$90.0	
LynnMall	2010	Auckland	36,811	130	$202.0	
The Base	2016 (50%)	Hamilton	88,319	158	$205.1	

== Retail ==
=== Centre Place ===
Centre Place is a shopping centre located in Hamilton and features Lido and METRO by Hoyts cinema complexes as well as retailers including Rebel Sport, Glassons, Rodd & Gunn and Chemist Warehouse. Kiwi Property acquired the asset in three tranches between December 1994 and December 2005.

In 2000, Centre Place underwent a $10 million redevelopment to increase the size of the shopping centre from 65 to 85 stores. Kiwi Property sold the newly redeveloped south section of the Centre Place shopping centre to Silverfin Capital for $46.7 million in late 2015.

=== The Plaza ===
The Plaza Shopping Centre is a shopping mall in the central area of Palmerston North, New Zealand owned by Kiwi Property.It is the largest shopping mall in the Manawatu region and is home to many of New Zealand's favourite brands. Originally 19,700 m2 (212,000 sq ft), the mall underwent redevelopment from 2008 to 2010 refurbishing the existing space and expanding to 32,000 m2 (340,000 sq ft).

Kiwi Property Retail Property Portfolio
Property	Year of Ownership	Location	NLA (sqm)	No. of Tenants	Valuation (millions)	Notes
Centre Place	1994	Hamilton	19,667	80	$32.2	
The Plaza Shopping Centre	1993	Palmerston North	32,241	93	$112.0	

== Office ==
=== Vero Centre ===
The Vero Centre (constructed as the Royal & SunAlliance Centre) is a high rise office tower located in Auckland, New Zealand. Constructed in 2000, it was Auckland's first major tower built since the 1980s. The centre contains a health club and gymnasium, main entry public foyer, retail outlets in the five podium levels and 32 office levels.

=== ASB North Wharf ===
ASB North Wharf is a seven-level office tower located in Auckland's Wynyard Quarter. The building opened in 2013 and was developed by Kiwi Property for ASB Bank, which as has a lease over all office space until 2031.

=== 56 The Terrace ===
The Aurora Centre located at 56 The Terrace in Wellington was acquired by Kiwi Property in April 2004 and underwent a comprehensive refurbishment and seismic strengthening project in 2016. The building is fully leased by the Ministry of Social Development until 2034.

Kiwi Property Office Property Portfolio
Property	Year of Ownership	Location	Net Leaseable Area (sqm)	No. of Tenants	Valuation (millions)	Notes
56 The Terrace	2004	Wellington	24,504	3	$146.0	
ASB North Wharf	2013	Auckland	21,621	12	$212.0	
Vero Centre	2001	Auckland	39,697	48	$458.0	
