= Vero Centre =

Office skyscraper in Auckland, New Zealand

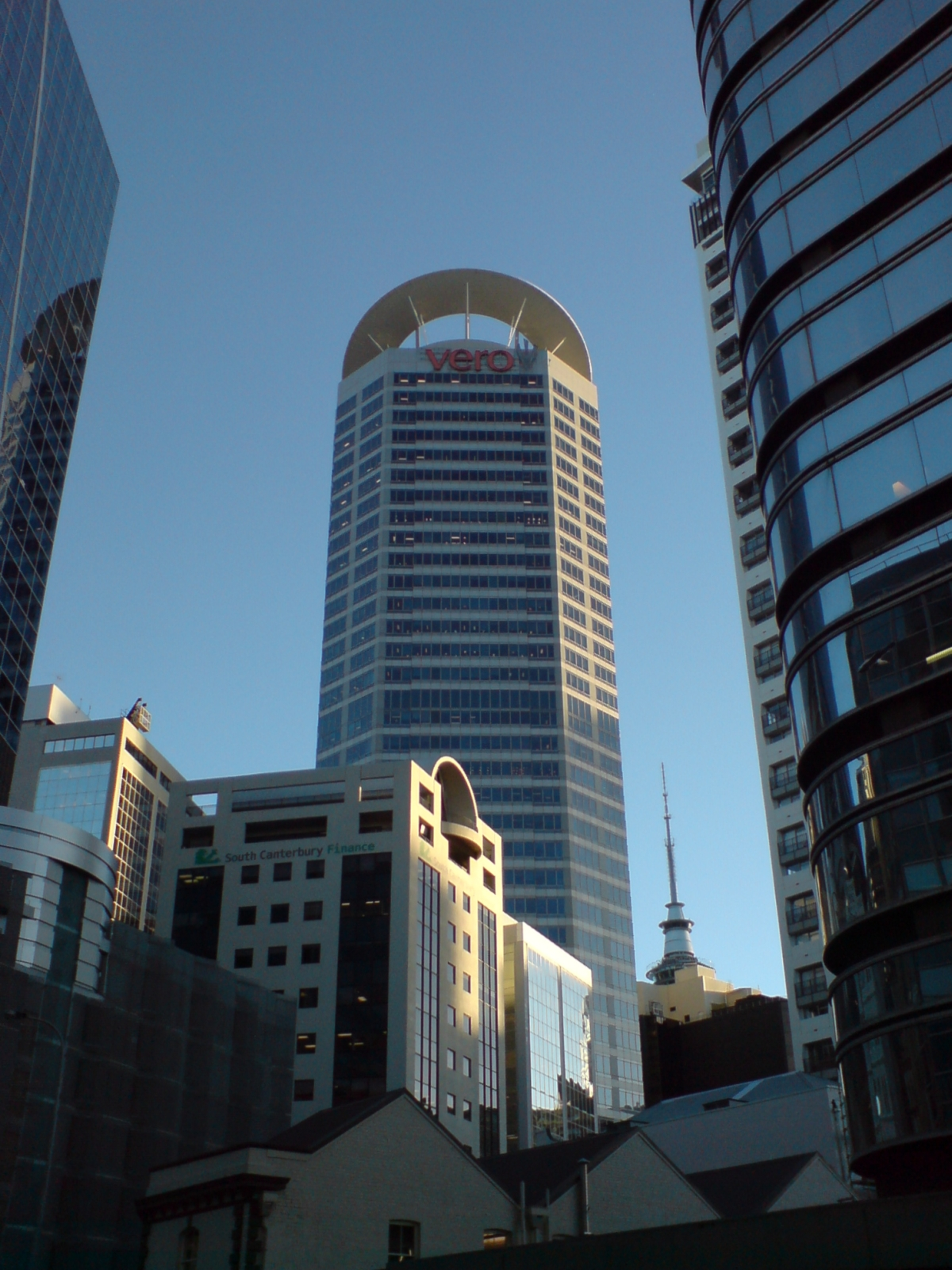
- The skyscraper in June 2008
- Interactive map of the Vero Centre area

General information
- Status: Completed
- Type: Office
- Location: 48 Shortland Street, Auckland, New Zealand
- Coordinates: 36°50′46.9″S 174°46′05.8″E
- Construction started: 1998
- Completed: 2000

Height
- Architectural: 170 m (558 ft)
- Tip: 170 m (558 ft)
- Roof: 150 m (492 ft)

Technical details
- Floor count: 38 (+ 5 below ground)
- Floor area: 68,900 m^{2} (741,633 sq ft)
- Lifts/elevators: 12

Design and construction
- Architect: Peddle Thorp
- Developer: Kiwi Property Group

The Vero Centre, formerly known as the Royal & SunAlliance Centre, is an office skyscraper in Auckland, New Zealand. Completed in 2000 and designed by Peddle Thorp, the skyscraper stands at a height of 170 m (558 ft) and features 38 floors. Upon its completion, it became the tallest building in New Zealand, surpassing The Ascott Metropolis. The building contains a health club and gymnasium, a main public entry foyer, retail outlets across five podium floors, and 32 office floors. It was the tallest building in New Zealand and the Polynesian Triangle for nearly two decades until June 2019, when the PwC Tower at Commercial Bay was topped out. It is also known for its halo roof feature.

While atypically tall compared to the surrounding area, its construction is considered to have had a positive effect on the regeneration of the eastern Auckland CBD area. The site had previously been occupied by a number of vacant lots and low-rise buildings, including student accommodation, industrial warehouses, and massage parlours.

The developer's design process made use of the bonus provisions of the District Plan, allowing them to build more floor area in exchange for public benefits such as displayed works of art and a public plaza. The value of these features to the general public has, however, been called into question by some critics. Additionally, the lack of a pedestrian connection through the building between the two frontage streets has been criticized.

The skyscraper received several awards for energy efficiency, such as the RICS International Award for Building Efficiency and Regeneration in 2001 and the EnergyWise Award in 2004, and has been calculated to use around 10% less energy than the average New Zealand Property Council building. The building houses a number of commissioned artworks, including Coral, by New Zealand sculptor Peter Roche.

== See also ==
- List of tallest buildings in Auckland
- List of tallest structures in New Zealand
