= Public transport in Waikato =

Public transport operator in the Waikato region, New Zealand

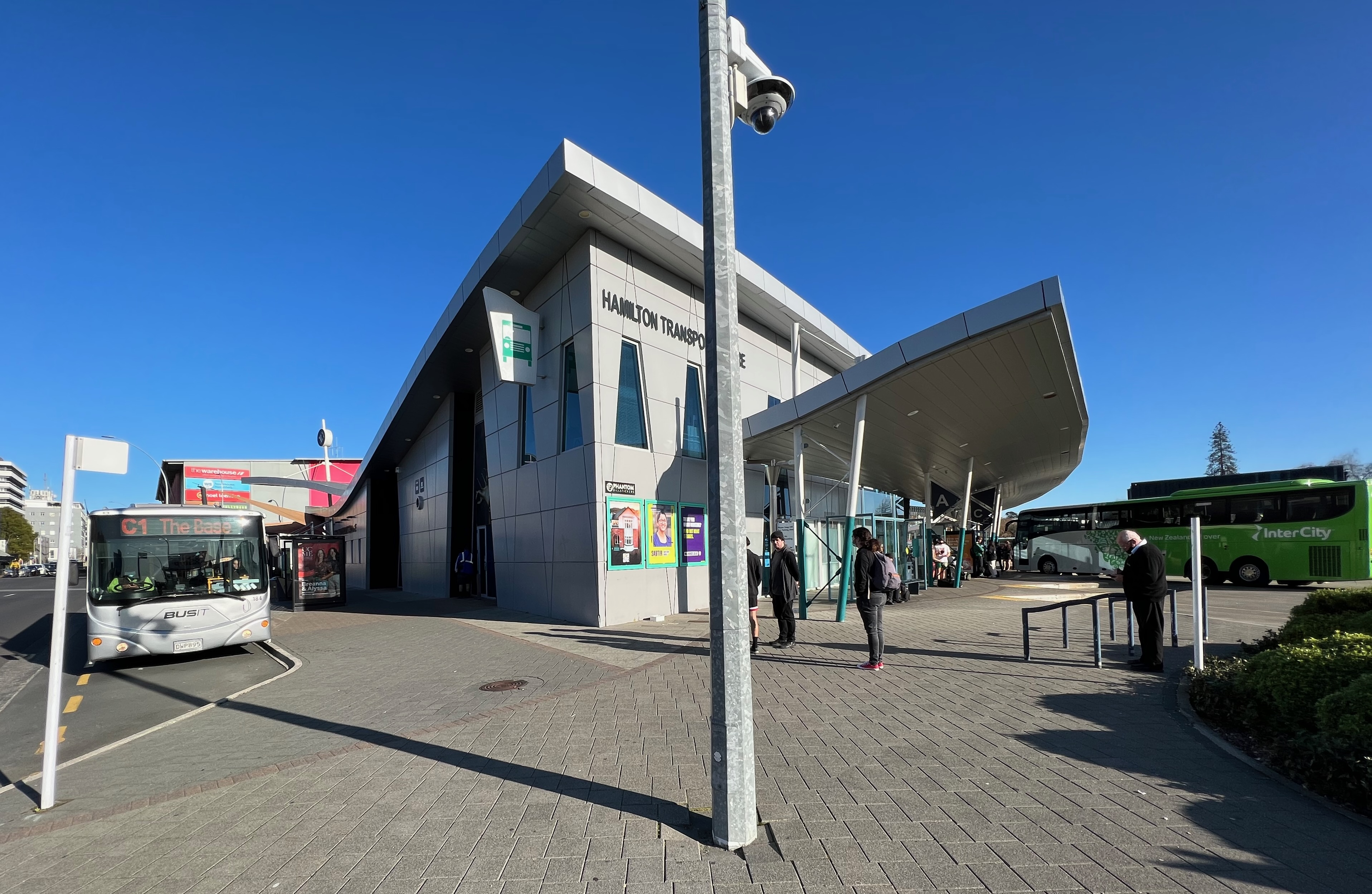
Hamilton Transport Centre in 2022

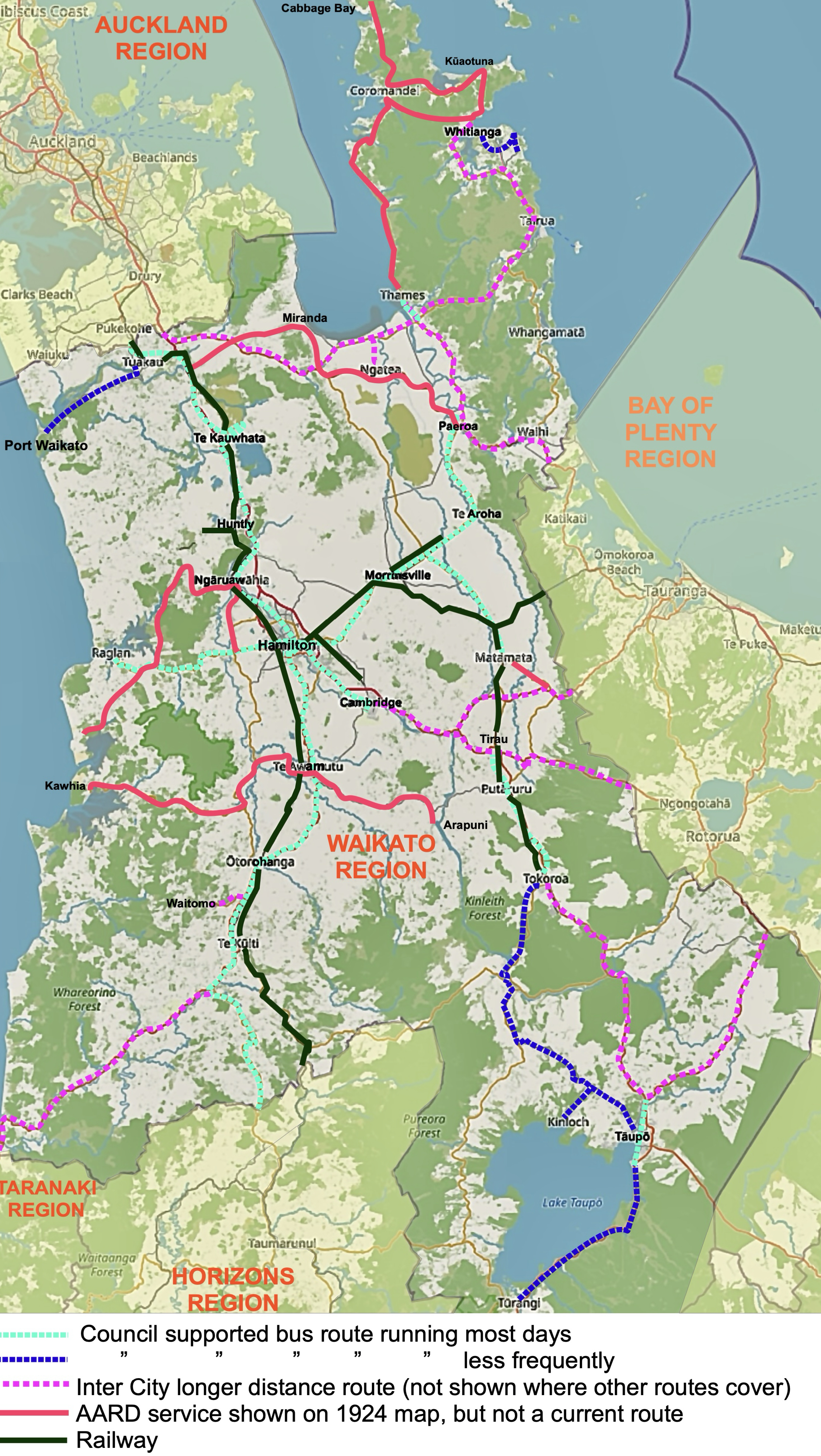
Current and former routes

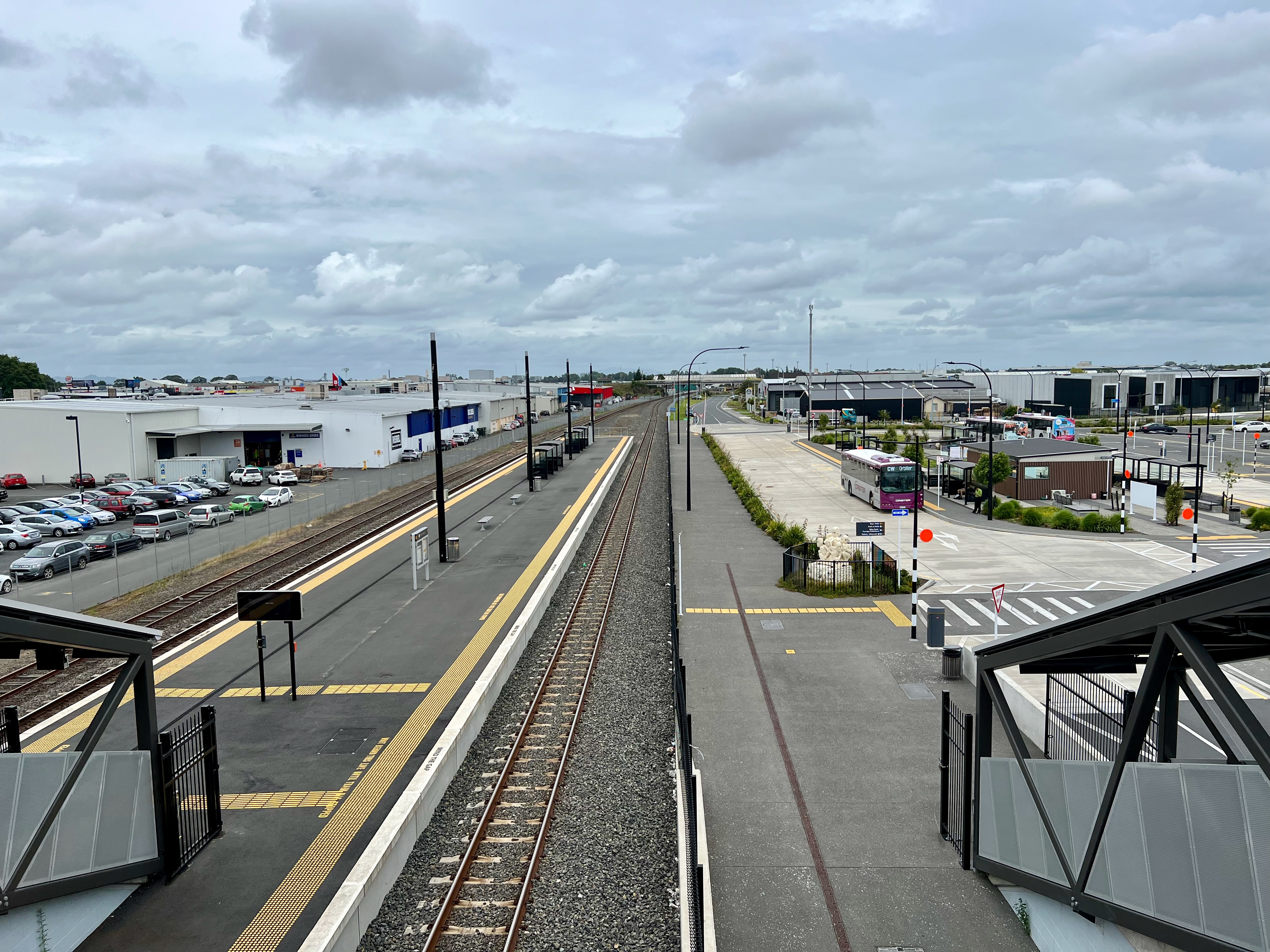
Rotokauri Transport Hub

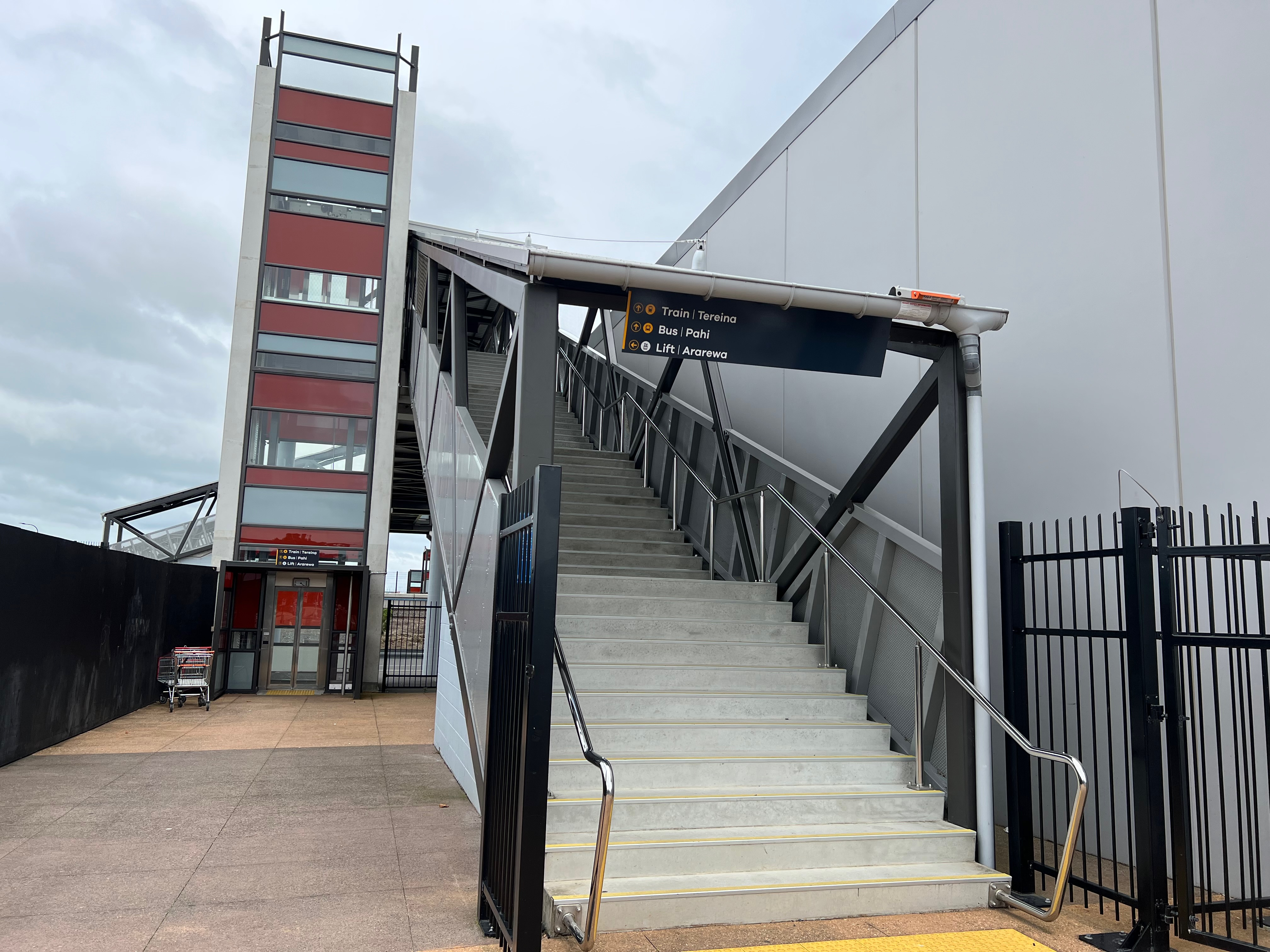
Rotokauri, The Base entrance

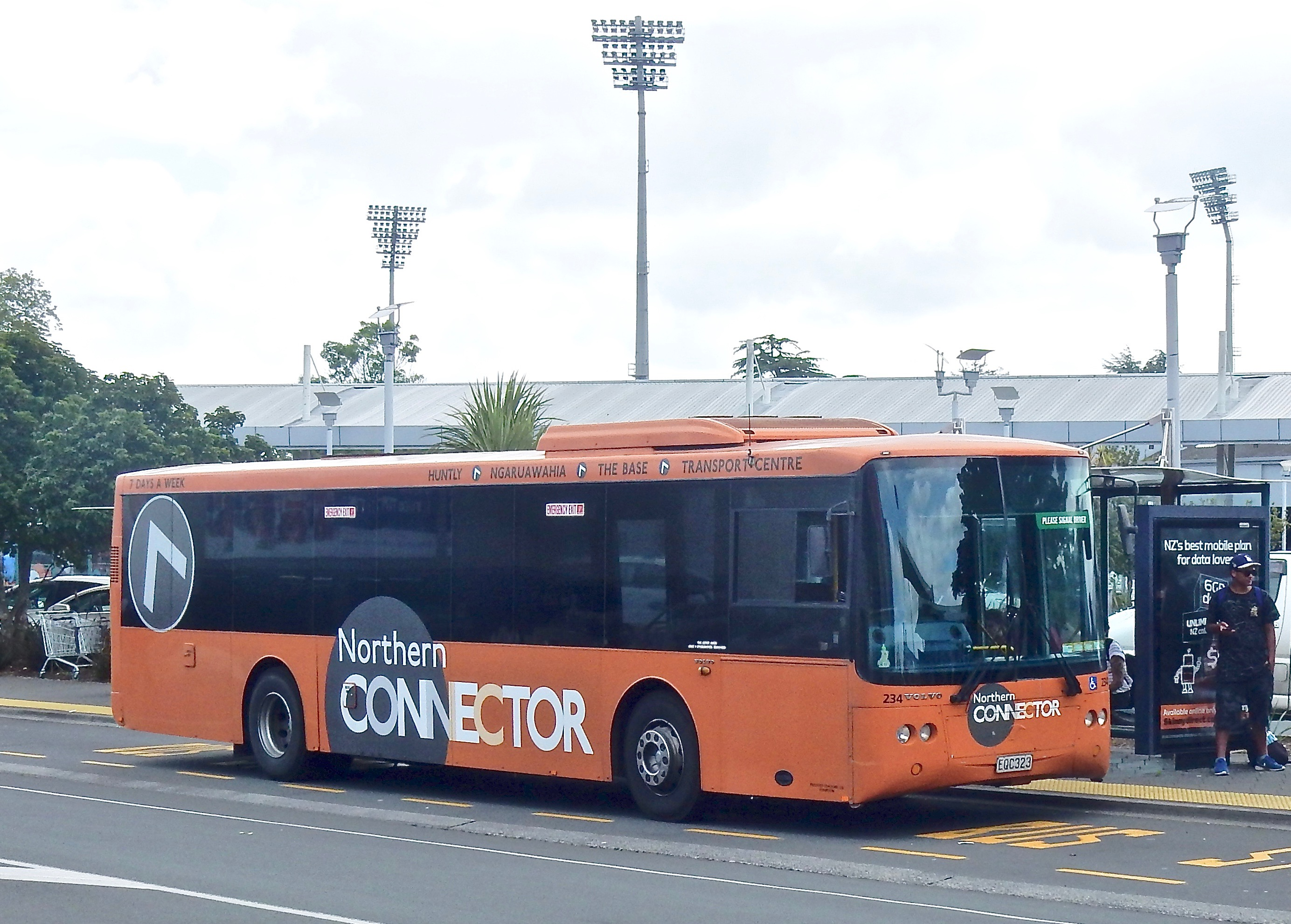
Volvo B7R Northern Connector bus at Hamilton Transport Centre – transferred to Pavlovich fleet in 2009. Seddon Park floodlights are in the background.

Public transport in Hamilton and the Waikato Region consists mainly of bus services, as well as some limited train and ferry services. Services are mainly infrequent, and investment hasn't been sufficient to compete with cars, so that subsidies, first introduced in 1971, have increased.

The 2021 Waikato Regional Transport Plan explained the small spend on public transport (7%) and walking/cycling (3%), saying that, although Government, "elevated climate change as a national strategic priority, the Government has not provided the funding to achieve the transformational change necessary to meet its climate change targets and expectations. Waka Kotahi states that 90% of anticipated revenue is committed to a significant programme of work already underway . . . There is therefore, extremely limited funding for new projects . . . to support mode shift and climate change transport activities, like cycling, walking and public transport initiatives."

So, although a Mass Transit Plan, aiming to increase public transport's share in Hamilton to 10%, by running services at 10 minute intervals, was to be developed in 2019, it has yet to be funded by Waka Kotahi. As the map shows, the coverage is sparse and even of those services which operate daily, most have only 2 or 3 buses a day in each direction. Only Hamilton urban services and those to Huntly run hourly, or more frequently. About 40% of passengers travelled on the two routes (Orbiter, Comet) which ran at 15 minute intervals. From Monday 21 February 2022, the less frequent Hamilton buses were cut to hourly, or 2-hourly, due to driver shortages.

The Te Huia commuter train started on 6 April 2021 and runs 6 days a week to Auckland Strand. The only other remaining passenger train is the Northern Explorer.

Ferries remain at Whitianga and Tairua. The Auckland-Coromandel ferry was suspended due to crew shortage, until Explore restarted it in 2025, though running only from October to April.

On 19 July 2021, a ferry service began on the Waikato River, linking Swarbrick's Landing and Braithwaite Park with the museum and gardens. However, the operator went into liquidation in December 2022 and no ferries run in Hamilton.

Shuttle buses provide the only public transport to a number of places, including Hamilton Airport, Whitianga and Whangamatā.

== Buses ==
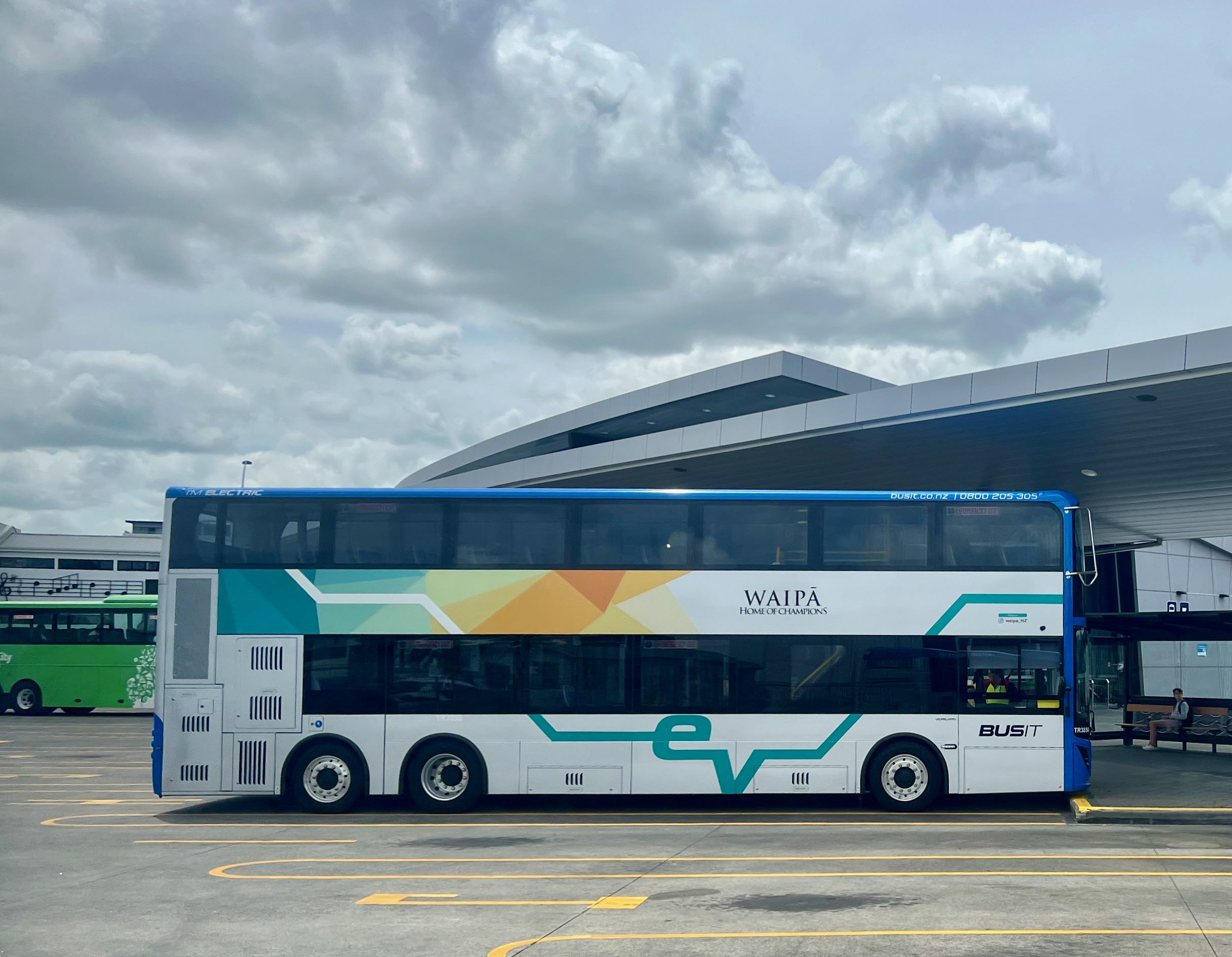
Cambridge electric double deck bus at Hamilton, 2024 - CRRC with Gemilang body

Hamilton has 23 bus routes covering most of its urban area. Buses also serve Cambridge, Coromandel, Huntly, Mangakino, Matamata, Morrinsville, Ngāruawāhia, Paeroa, Pukekohe, Raglan, Taupō, Thames, Te Aroha, Te Awamutu, Te Kauwhata, Tīrau Tuakau, Putāruru and Tokoroa. A summer shuttle runs between Hahei and Cathedral Cove. Services are operated by 105 buses, 74 of them on Hamilton urban routes. With a break in 2017, Tairua Bus serves Whitianga, Tairua and Ngatea.

Since the sale of the west Hamilton routes in 2018, all Hamilton buses have been operated by GoBus (successor to Buses Ltd – see Hamilton routes below). From 30 September 2017, Pavlovich Coachlines had operated buses in west Hamilton and, prior to that, just the Orbiter. In 2022, Tranzit took on Taupō services and in 2024 also Cambridge and Te Awamutu routes.

InterCity operate long-distance bus services and some regional connections.

=== Hamilton City routes ===
Route	Start	Finish	Route No.	Notes
Hamilton city			1–19,51	Flex airport shuttle at the Transport Centre There are currently 19 routes serving Hamilton urban area. Until 2022 most operated to a half-hourly frequency, the exceptions being the Orbiter (serving the edge of the CBD and the main suburban destinations, such as the Hospital, The Base (from 2 February 2021 accessed via the bridge from Rotokauri Transport Hub), Chartwell and Waikato University, started on 17 July 2006, restored to a 15-minute frequency from 30 September 2017), and with 2 double deck 87-seat buses from 9 April 2017, the Comet (Hospital-CBD-The Base from 1 April 2019) and the free CBD Shuttle (started April 2006, but replaced by a $1 Central City zone on 6 July 2020). Night Rider buses stopped with the COVID epidemic in 2020 and were replaced by two on-demand 16-seat Flex buses, running from 6pm on Fridays and Saturdays from 14 January 2022. )An additional Flex service to Hamilton Airport was launched in February 2022, but was discontinued by February 2024 due to low usage and high annual costs. Otherwise, no buses run after 10pm. Meteor Volvo B7RLE bus beside the Transport Centre The Meteor, the third 15-min interval bus, replaced the 2 (Silverdale) and 8 (Frankton) routes from 28 August 2023, running between Rotokauri, Frankton, Transport Centre, university and Silverdale. From 30 September 2017 buses 1, 9 and 18 were extended to connect with Orbiter and Northern Connector buses at The Base, whilst Hamilton Lake (a new route in 2012) and some roads in Hamilton east lost their bus, when route 15 was ended. From 2 February 2021, the Orbiter was re-routed via Rotokauri Transport Hub, with a footbridge link to The Base. This was to avoid congestion at The Base and link with Te Huia from 12 April 2021. An advert in 1 June 1937 Railways Magazine showed 10 buses (until 1927 there had been 14 run by Watson, Jubilee and Blue bus companies; Waikato Motor Bus Co started in 1922 and Watsons in 1924, or 1923, as the Green Bus) in the Buses Ltd (Blue Buses) fleet and said they met all trains at Frankton Junction. Buses Ltd had cut its fares in 1928 to achieve a virtual monopoly by driving Green Bus Co. out of business. Major cuts were made in 1971, including all buses after 6pm and on Sundays. No buses now serve the railway station.
Frankton	1913		8	2 Chelmsford steam buses, imported for a Devonport-Takapuna service in 1904, were unsuccessful and were railed to Hamilton in 1906. They probably failed to be profitable on the Frankton route too (possibly because of tyre damage on the rough roads), as horses were again the motive power by 1910. No mention was made of the steam buses when new services were being planned in 1911, 1912 and 1913, when Frankton Hamilton Bus Co (A H Hyde) was allowed to put notices on poles to advertise the 5 buses a day in each direction. Waikato Motor Co Ltd advertised that Daimler buses and Chrysler cars met all trains in 1921. A 1925 photo shows a bus on the new concrete road in Commerce St, Frankton. A 1930s photo shows a Brockway bus on the Frankton-Hamilton East route.
Hamilton-Temple View			19	After a joint Temple View Community Board / Environment Waikato meeting, the bus route closed on Wed 24 December 1997 "due to low passenger numbers". Temple View became part of Hamilton in 2004, adding 430 hectares and 1,400 people. Route 26 was then extended from Dinsdale. Until 2022 it ran half hourly weekdays and hourly on Saturdays, taking 23 minutes for the 8 km (5.0 mi) between the Transport Centre and Cowley Dr, Temple View. The Bremworth and Temple View routes were divided and renumbered to 19 from 12 August 2020, with each reduced to an hourly frequency.

=== SH1 routes to Cambridge and south east – current route 20 ===
Route	Start	Finish	Route No.	Notes
Hamilton-Cambridge			20	Mail coaches were meeting trains initially at Ngāruawāhia, from 1877, and Hamilton from 1881. Local chemist, Edward Boucher Hill, started a car hire service in 1912 Corpe and Edwards started a timetabled motor service from 5 August 1917. A more frequent service was running in 1920. By 1928 there were 6 buses a day. A Cambridge-Auckland bus started in 1932. Bus 20 now runs 8 buses a day. Tranzit took over the route from GoBus from 1 January 2024. On Cambridge and Te Awamutu routes electric single deck buses were introduced in February 2024 and electric double deckers in November 2024.
27 Tauwhare Pa				Flex minibuses started to serve Tamahere from 12 February 2024 after closure of the airport service.
28 Tamahere /Matangi				
Cambridge-Karapiro				Buses Ltd operated services in the 1940s.
Hamilton-Taupō	? 1923	–		Inter City provide buses taking about 2 to 3 hours via Rotorua, or via Tokoroa. 1923 reports said service cars were getting stuck between Putaruru and Taupō. From 1924 a route via Cambridge, Hora Hora, Ātiamuri, Wairakei was run by Noel Douglas Robertson until 1928 "owing to competition of the Hawkes Bay and Aard Services" New Zealand Railways Road Services took over the Hamilton-Rotorua route in 1937 and combined it with their Auckland route. Until sold off in 2013, there was a bus station in Gascoigne St, but buses now stop on Tongariro St in Taupō.
Tokoroa-Tīrau	2015		30, 31, 37	The Tokoroa Urban Connector (renamed South Waikato Connector from 31 October 2022) began running on 22 June 2015, serving Tokoroa, Putāruru and Tīrau It is being funded on an annual basis. A Tokoroa-Putāruru-Hamilton service started in 1946. WINZ and S Waikato District, funded workers services between Tokoroa and Taupō, Mangakino and Ātiamuri in May 2005, but ended in 2007, except that buses continue linking Mangakino to Taupō and Tokoroa on Tuesdays and Fridays.
Te Awamutu – Rotorua				A Te Awamutu – Arapuni – Putaruru – Rotorua car started in 1925, taking about 4 hours. A ¾ ton International 'Model S', bodied by Hamilton coachbuilder J. B. Pomeroy, transported workers to Arapuni Dam until its completion in 1929.
Taupō	2004		33 - 38	A bus operated by Waipawa Buses served most of Taupō's suburbs until 5 January 2022. After five days without services, GoBus took over. From Monday 31 October 2022 Tranzit took over the contract and the Taupō Connector became a single route between Wharewaka and Nukuhau. Also Connect2Taupō started to serve Acacia Bay, Kinloch, Tūrangi and Wairakei at least one day a week, in addition to the Mangakino and Tokoroa links. A 27-seat electric bus took over Connector services from 4 December 2023.
Auckland-Napier				AARD took 13 hours for a route via Hamilton, Rotorua and Taupō by 1938.

=== SH1 routes to Huntly and north west – current routes 21 and 44 ===
Route	Start	Finish	Route No.	Notes
Hamilton-Huntly	1933		21	Buses daily, mostly hourly, the most frequent Waikato bus outside Hamilton From 1933 a Hamilton-Pukemiro service was run by Buses Ltd (Blue Buses), though, a year earlier, it had been refused on the ground that there was an adequate train service. Buses Ltd ran the Huntly service at least from 1933. In 2006 Pavlovich won the Huntly contract. In 2013 the route was renamed 'Northern Connector' and Sunday services added. From 18 April 2017 each bus has 2 bike racks and GoBus takes over from Pavlovich. Hamilton to Huntly buses all had a 40-minute timetable in 2004, but most were then allowed 55 minutes, then 52 mins. From 29 January 2019 'Huntly Assist' services have been operated by a MAN double decker bus.
Hamilton – Pukekohe			44	via Te Kauwhata – Meremere – ran fortnightly until becoming Mon-Fri in 2019. Buses have linked Pukekohe and Tuakau since at least 1929. They were sold to Railways Road Services on 28 April 1946. Route 44 is operated by GoBus. From 10 January 2021 the Pōkeno to Pukekohe section was increased to 12 buses a day, or 6 at weekends.
Hamilton-Auckland				The earliest coach service seems to date back to 1872, departing 6am, arriving 7.30pm, and running alternate days in each direction. Direct Motors was advertising two sedan cars a day in 1928. By 1938 NZR Road Services advertised 3 hours for the journey. Inter City now run 17 buses a day.
Port Waikato-Pukekohe				Thursday only bus until 16 April 2026 when it ended due to lack of passengers.
Hamilton-Orini				Although licenses were refused for Orini and Whitikahu in 1938, these rural areas, north east of Hamilton, had a bus to the city until about 1970.
Glen Massey-Ngāruawāhia	?	?		Walkers Transport, Ngāruawāhia
Te Akau-Ngāruawāhia	1921			Robert Gibb ran a 1920 International from 21 January 1921, which ran alternate days and took about 3½ hrs.

=== SH26 routes to Morrinsville and SH2 routes to east – current routes 22 and 25 ===
Route	Start	Finish	Route No.	Notes
Hamilton-Paeroa	?1923	–	22	A mail coach to Te Aroha met trains in 1881. A Coromandel-Thames service car was running in 1920. Buses Ltd took over the A L Dent Te Aroha-Hamilton service in 1932. A Thames-Paeroa-Waihi bus ran several times a day in 1969, with connections to Hamilton. The Hamilton-Morrinsville-Paeroa bus is least frequent of the buses connecting Hamilton with neighbouring towns. Bus 25 linked Hamilton and Coromandel along the same route, until April 2017. From 18 April 2017 the service was cut back to Paeroa, using a bus with 2 bike racks and GoBus took over from Turley Motors. A Coromandel – Paeroa – Rotorua service started on 8 May 2017, but was suspended when Naked Buses were sold to Ritchies on 15 July 2018. InterCity provides a Thames-Coromandel-Whitianga link.
Thames	2017			The tramway to Tararu closed in 1874. The bus service to Tararu and other parts of the coast closed in June 1972. A trial service of 5 buses a day on a local service began in 2017. It carried 852 passengers in its first month.
Auckland-Paeroa-Waihi	1922	–		A Thames-Paeroa service had probably started in 1914, a Thames-Turua service car started in 1919, and services to Ngatea, Pōkeno and Auckland in 1922. An AARD service advertised in 1926 as connecting with services to Thames, Waihi and Te Aroha, was later extended to Ōpōtiki. The Thames services were taken over by NZR in 1947.
Waihi-Tauranga	?1919	–		A 1919 photo showed a service car outside Waihi Post Office. AARD service advertised in 1926 took 3½hrs. InterCity now schedule an hour for the 60 km (37 mi).
Auckland-Morrinsville-Te Aroha-Matamata-Tauranga/Rotorua-Taupō	1928	1981		A Matamata-Tauranga motor service was being advertised in 1916 and Auckland-Paeroa and Thames in 1926. Edwards Motors Ltd ran a daily service from 1928 to 1981, being renamed Midland-Edwards Coachlines Ltd from March 1969. In Matamata a purpose-built terminal in Broadway was erected in 1954. Edwards Motors Morrinsville Bus Depot was on the corner of Canada and Thames Street in 1968. In 1955 services were being run to Auckland, Tauranga, Hamilton, Rotorua, Paeroa and Putāruru, with a head office and garage at Gittos St, Auckland. Edwards Motors imported 2 Bedford SB coaches with Duple Vega bodies in 1952/53 for its Auckland – Morrinsville – Matamata service. Edwards introduced New Zealand's first rear-engined coaches in the summer of 1948, Reo No 21 "The Landliner" for its Auckland–Morrinsville–Matamata–Tauranga service, and, in 1956, the Bedford "Vistaliner" coaches. W J Stanley got a licence for Matamata-Tauranga in 1936. In 1938 the service car (photo) was caught by a bridge collapse. Matamata is now served by InterCity Hamilton-Tauranga and Auckland-Rotorua routes.
Hamilton-Matamata			22	Edwards Motors was running this route by 1933, together with a Waharoa service. In 2017 Matamata Piako District Council asked for a viability study into restoring a service. From 12 July 2021 3 Morrinsville services are extended to Matamata on weekdays and named 'Eastern Connector'.
Matamata-Okauia				Service to hot springs began in 1923 and was running in 1938.
Tauranga-Matamata	1916			Service car met Auckland trains – run by H M Griffiths. By 1926 it was part of the AARD services. Trains reached Tauranga in 1927.

=== SH23 routes to west coast – current route 23 ===
Route	Start	Finish	Route No.	Notes
Hamilton-Raglan	1880		23	A coach service started as soon as the road was built. A motor service car was introduced about 1915 Operators included Alic Jackson (1880), C.R. Johnston, Hamilton (1895), Dalgleish & McDonald, J.K. Jefferies & Co., Bob Aitken, R.T. (Dick) Turpin, Noel Douglas Robertson, H. Rogers, Fordy Wade, M. Pavlovich (1966), and, currently, GoBus. From 18 April 2017 each bus has 2 bike racks, an extra weekday bus runs and Sunday buses are restored. A MAN ND323F double decker started operating a peak hour service to Hamilton in the mornings and return in the afternoons from 29 January 2019.
Kāwhia-Hamilton	1922	c.1923		From March 1922 a two and a half hour, Pakoka Landing to Frankton, via Te Mata, "Silver Trail", bus service started, with a motor launch connection to Kāwhia on Fridays. Problems with rough roads and tides caused it to fail. (see also SH3 route below)
Kāwhia-Auckland	1938	1976		In 1938 Western Highways started a service from Kāwhia to Auckland via Makomako, Te Mata, Waingaro and Tuakau (via Highway 22) and back the next day. In 1946 Brosnan Motors started a daily run, leaving Kāwhia at 5.45am, arriving at Auckland at 1pm, returning at 2 pm. and back at Kāwhia about 9.30pm. In 1950 Brosnan Motors sold the Raglan-Kāwhia section to Norman Rankin, who ended it in 1952. Brosnan Motors sold the Raglan-Auckland route to Pavlovich Motors in 1971. The first bus used on the Auckland-Kāwhia run was a 7-seater Studebaker. Then a 10-seater Dodge used by Norman Collett later gave way to a 14-seater Oldsmobile. As the roads improved 18 and 21-seater Diamond T buses took over. Later 40-seaters ran from Raglan to Auckland, until Pavlovich closed the route in 1976. Pavlovich later said the route had been purchased to gain a licence with access to the Auckland area.
Te Pahu-Hamilton				A Te Pahu-Whatwhata-Hamilton motor mail service was advertised in 1916 and 1917.
Pirongia-Hamilton				Lewis Hodgson took over a Pirongia-Whatawhata-Hamilton route in 1932.

=== SH3 routes to Te Awamutu and south west – current route 24 ===
Route	Start	Finish	Route No.	Notes
Hamilton-Te Awamutu			24	GoBus run a daily service. Hodgson's ran the service from at least 1933 In 1988 a Monday and Friday bus was extended to Tokanui. Hodgsons became Hodgsons GoBus and the service was augmented to include weekend and additional weekday journeys in December 2010. The increase was from 4 to 8 buses on weekdays, with 3 at weekends. Tranzit took over the route from GoBus from 1 January 2024.
Hamilton-Taumarunui			25 and 26	In July 2022 the Taumarunui health shuttle (see below) was made available to fare paying passengers on a trial basis. From Monday 13 February 2023 the 26 Te Kūiti Connector links Te Kūiti to Wintec's Rotokauri campus in Hamilton. Taumarunui bus 26 ends on 26 June 2026, when it will be replaced by a smaller, health only, shuttle bus.
Hamilton-Pirongia	1926	?		Noel Douglas Robertson of Raglan was running a bus in 1926. 1903 photo of coach and horses By 1933 Hodgsons were running a route via Te Awamutu.
Hamilton-Kāwhia				A coach connected Kāwhia from at least 1900 to 1922. A Kāwhia mail car was running by 1923. An AARD service via Te Awamutu ran daily from 1926 to 1931. By 1932 Advance Cars ran it only between Kāwhia and Te Awamutu and it was still running in 1939. (see also SH23 route above).
Hamilton-New Plymouth				An Awakino-Waitara mail coach was running by 1911 and by 1916 service cars replaced it in summer and the 1917 timetable was much faster, with a regular Te Kūiti-New Plymouth service car from 1925, connecting with Auckland trains. A Hamilton-Te Kūiti service car caught fire in 1925. AARD and White Star through services advertised in 1926 took 10hrs. InterCity now schedule 4 hours for the 241 km (150 mi).
Hangatiki-Waitomo				AARD service advertised in 1926 as meeting north and south-bound trains.
Waitomo-Rotorua	1927	?		via Kihi Kihi-Pukeatua-Arapuni-Mamaku run by Noel Douglas Robertson, then Railways Road Services from 1940
Te Kūiti-Moeatoa	1920			From 1920 service cars served Piopio daily and other places such as Mahoenui and Marokopa a few times a week. An Auckland Weekly News photo of 12 March 1925 showed a service car at Waitanguru "about 20 miles from Te Kuiti" and a New Zealand Herald report later that year said the mail bus to the west coast via Mairoa and Waitanguru had been resumed after floods.

=== Education and Health buses ===
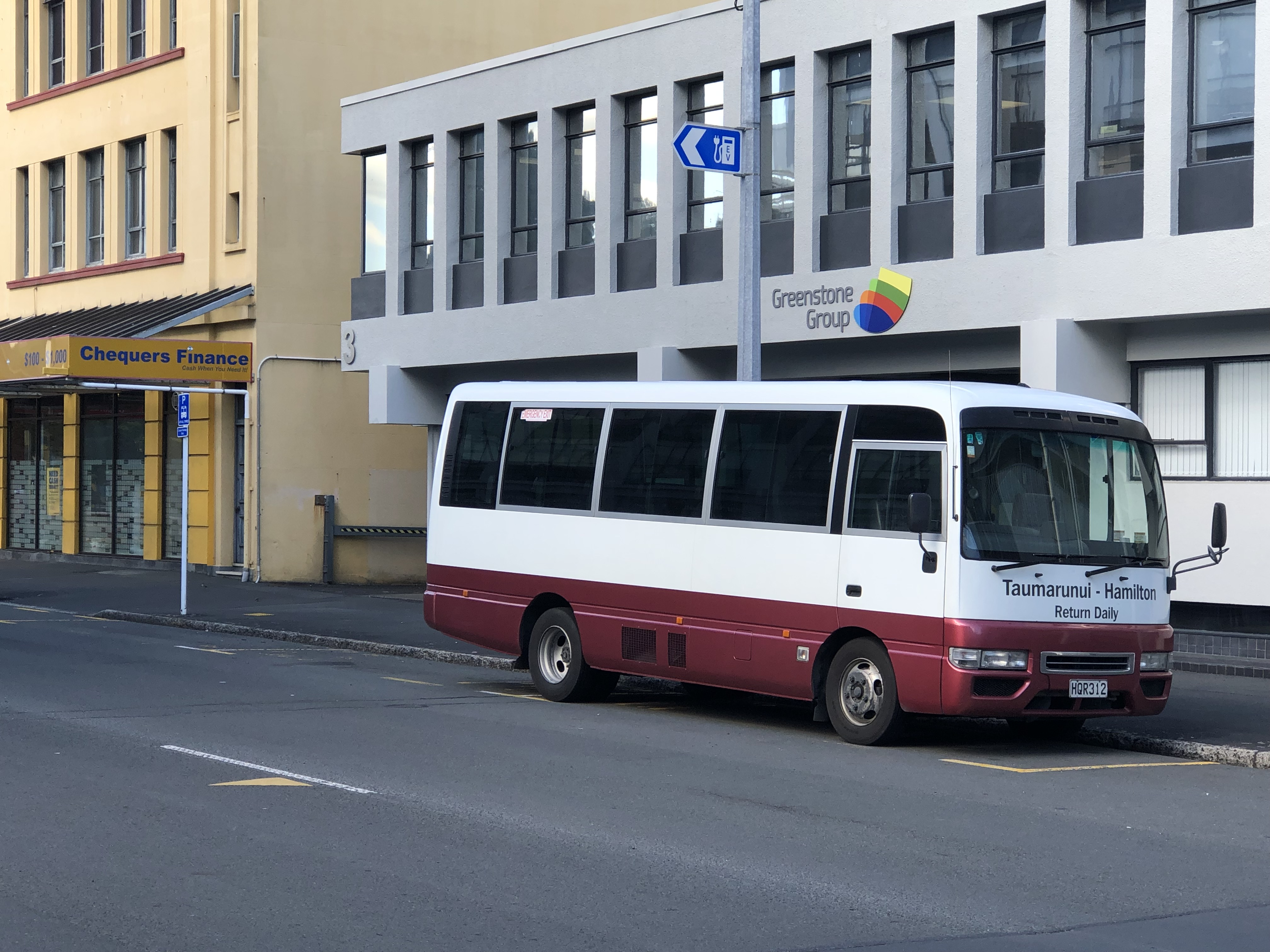
Taumarunui – Hamilton bus parked in Caro St, Hamilton in 2019

In addition to the buses of commercial operators and those supported by Regional Council, there is a large network of buses serving schools and a much smaller one serving hospitals. The first school bus in the country ran in Waikato on 1 April 1924, allowing local schools near Piopio to be closed. Many companies now run school bus services, including GoBus, Cambridge Travel Lines and Murphy. The Ministry of Education set 1 July 2018 as a date to withdraw ten school buses it considered could be accommodated on public buses. However, that was reduced to a possible two (Cambridge to St Johns and Morrinsville to Sacred Heart) in 2017.

The health buses are mainly funded by the District Health Board and link Waikato Hospital to most of the regions towns and some outside the region, such as Taumarunui.

From February 2017 University of Waikato has been using car parking fees to subsidise student fares by 30% and to provide new bus links to Tokoroa, Putāruru, Ngāruawāhia, Huntly, Te Kauwhata, Thames, Piopio, Te Kūiti, Ōtorohanga, Matamata, Coromandel, Whitianga and Whangamata.

== Proposed services ==
=== Hamilton rapid transit ===
As noted above, a mass transit plan is being developed. An August 2023 council meeting had a report that the cost could be up to $6.5bn, over 30 years. The concept is for a bus rapid transit network linking the airport, Ruakura and Te Awa Lakes at 5-minute intervals during the peak.

=== Waihi Beach-Paeroa & Thames - Ngatea - Paeroa - Te Aroha ===
A consultation happened in 2022 about a 2-hourly Waihi Beach to Paeroa route and a morning and afternoon return service from Thames to Te Aroha via Ngatea and Paeroa, with connections to Hamilton, to start in 2023.

=== Raglan-Whale Bay ===
Waikato District Council is considering a Raglan local service.

=== Kāwhia-Hamilton ===
A 2022 Plan proposes to reintroduce at least daily bus.

== Patronage ==
Only 1.4% of travellers used public transport in 2018, compared with 7.3% nationally and a median of 17.5% in Europe.

Travel to work by mode (2018 Census)
Transport mode	NZ	Waikato region	Hamilton
Public transport	6.2%	1.2%	2.8%
Walk/cycle	5.2%	5.6%	7.2%
Work from home	11.9%	15.1%	8.3%
Other	1.4%	1.6%	1.0%
Vehicle (driving/passenger)	73%	76.5%	80.8%

Waikato, like all other regions, with the exception of Auckland and Wellington, saw falls in use of public transport from 2012. Since 2014, the average number of trips per person per year in Waikato has declined from 10.1 to 4.7 in 2021/22, though bus trips have since risen slightly, from 788,600 per quarter in 2021 to 823,800 in 2023.

As noted above, patronage is low.

Totals of rural and urban passenger journeys per financial year in Waikato

Sources 1962–76, 1991–95, 1996–2001, 2002–2007, 2008, 2009/10, 2011/12, 2013/14, 2014/15, 2016, 2017, 2018, 2019, 2020, 2021.

In the year to March 2016 patronage in Hamilton was down 6.4% to 3,636,214 and declined a further 5.3% in Hamilton, and 4.1% on satellite routes, to February 2017. Hamilton patronage was down 0.5% in the year to July 2018, but up 0.19% with satellite routes included. COVID-19 resulted in a 41.3% fall in 2020.

This table shows patronage by routes for the year to January 2017, Bee card records at the Transport Centre between 22 and 28 February 2021, 2021 year and Jan-Mar 2026 -

Route	Patronage 2016	Change from 2016	2021 Transport Centre tag on/off	2021	2026 (3mths)
52 Orbiter & CBD Shuttle	1,035,003	−10.2%		573,000	248,966
21 Northern Connector (Huntly)	242,110	−3.4%	1,989	167,000	50,079
Pukekohe to Pōkeno (44) and Port Waikato (NW3)				10,000	10,029
2 Silverdale	208,521	−1.3%	2,658	(now Meteor)	163,667
16 Rototuna	180,030	−8.8%	1,828		29,966
8 Frankton	173,344	−7.3%	1,850	(now Meteor)	
6 Mahoe - from 1 April 2019 part of Comet route	153,155	−2.4%	2,181 (Comet north bound)	289,000	124,307
3 Dinsdale	148,164	−1.7%	1,838		16,034
18 Te Rapa	140,598	−5%	1,588		19,146
13 University	133,236	−2.7%	2,450		11,502
17 Hamilton E / University	125,853	−2.4%	2,450		13,841
9 Nawton	118,541	−6.3%	1,599		16,891
12 Fitzroy	115,903	−3.5%	1,376		19,327
1 Pukete	113,700	−5.5%	1,271		21,071
4 Flagstaff	109,986	−5.5%	1,506		31,237
14 Claudelands	105,947	−5.5%	1,406		25,561
7 Glenview	102,517	−3.9%	(now Comet)		
10 Hillcrest	94,272	−5.1%	1,340		19,036
11 Fairfield	92,185	−12.2%	1,231		23,626
50 Rototuna direct (now Circular)	75,068	24.7%	515		16,776
5 Chartwell	67,799	−1.6%	414		11,762
24 Te Awamutu	65,937	−4%	1.122	62,000	36,882
26 Te Kuiti Connector					2,376
23 Raglan	60,022	−0.6%	799	56,000	22,839
26 (now 19) Bremworth / Temple View	56,771	−5.5%	827		7,928
20 Cambridge	49,285	−4.7%	678	50,000	42,103
27 Tauwhare Pa					514
28 Tamahere/Matangi					964
15 Ruakura	47,181	−7.8%	closed 2017		
21 Northern Connector (Hamilton)	45,611	1.7%	1,918 (Comet south bound)		
22 Morrinsville/Paeroa/Matamata	27,886	−1.9%	334	9,000	13,983
Thames from 2017				9,000	
Cathedral Cove, Hahei	27,000	(summer only)			
Tokoroa from 2015				17,000	2,215
31 Tokoroa District – Tīrau					990
32 Tokoroa Connector-Hamilton					2,240
South Waikato Urban Connector	2,232	(14 weeks in 2015)			
33 Taupō	24,912	(2015 figure)		9,000	3,508
34 Taupo-Acacia Bay	Mon, Wed & Thu				26
36 Taupo-Turangi	Mon & Thu				353
37 Mangakino from 2015	Tue & Fri			1,600	469
38 Taupo-Wairakei	Tue & Fri				115
Special events	20,471	37.4%			
4N Flagstaff North	16,771	(new route)			7,103
29 Hamilton Gardens	10,916	10.3%			now bus 17
30 Northerner	4,176	−0.1%			
41 Huntly Internal service	2,829	1.9%			
Night Rider East	1,128	−2.6%			
Night Rider West	583	−4.7%			

== Overcrowding ==
Patronage varies greatly, with all seats taken on the Orbiter at rush hours and over 60% full on the Northern Connector (serving Huntly and The Base), Raglan and Silverdale routes. However, a dozen routes have less than a quarter of seats taken in an average rush hour. Over 1,300 buses were full to capacity in 2015/16, 482 of them on the Orbiter route. This provoked complaints, particularly concerning the infrequent Raglan bus, which was fully loaded 22 times in 2015/16.

== Infrastructure ==
=== Transport Centre ===
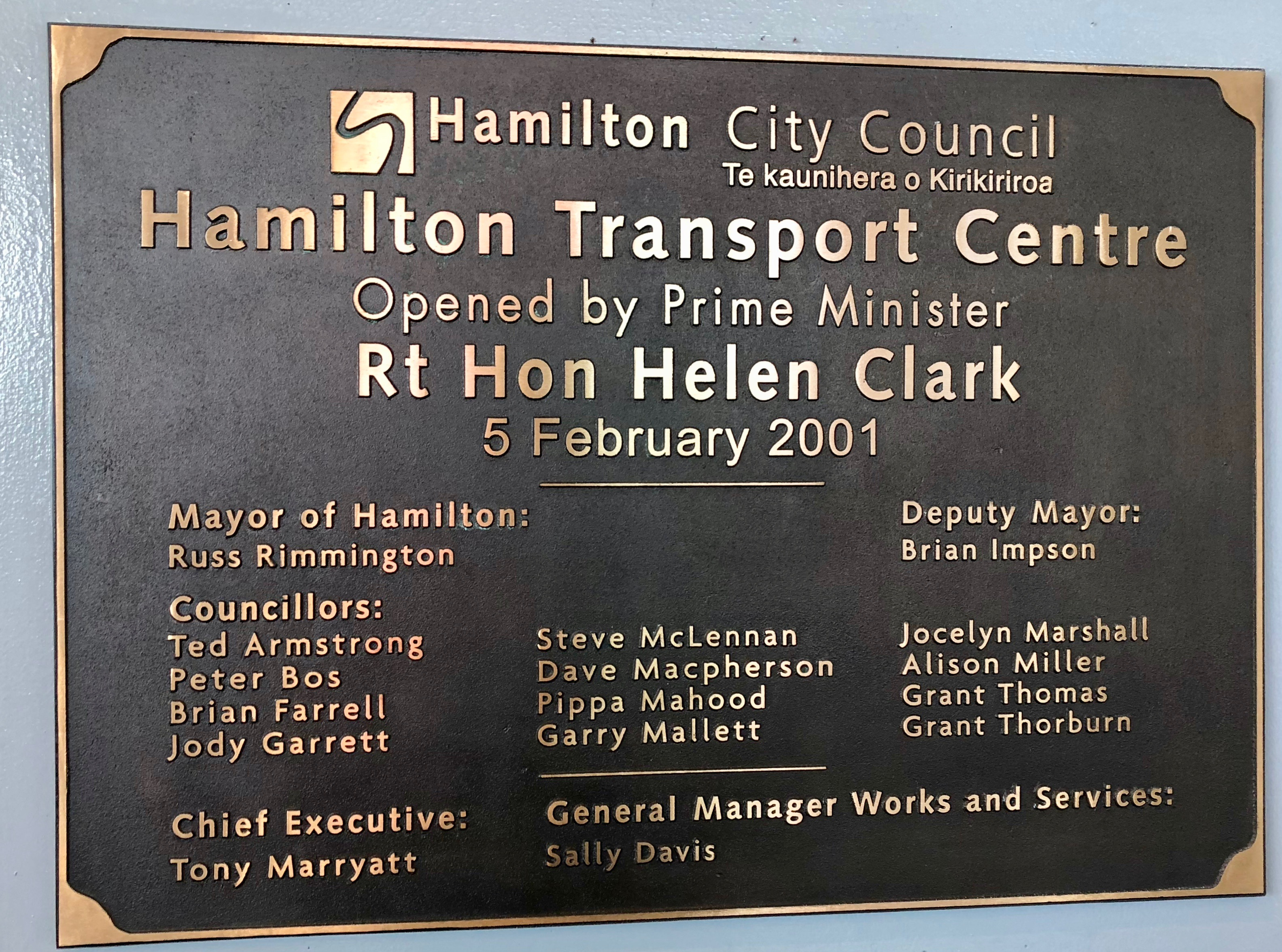
Plaque near the main entrance.

Most of Waikato's buses start and end their journeys at the Transport Centre on the corner of Anglesea St and Bryce St, formerly the Ellis and Burnand timber yard. The map of the Centre shows 27 stops in and around it. As well as bus stops and shelters, it has toilets, a cafe, an information counter and a booking office. It opened in 2001 and was designed by Worley Architects. Prior to that the Transport Centre was the name later given to the 1958 bus station on the other side of Bryce St (now The Warehouse, but once the NZR Road Services depot and bus stops), which was linked by a ramp to the underground station at Hamilton Central. That site and the current centre and neighbouring properties are now included in Development Site 4 in the city's local area plan. In earlier years buses had several terminals, including Frankton Junction and Garden Place.

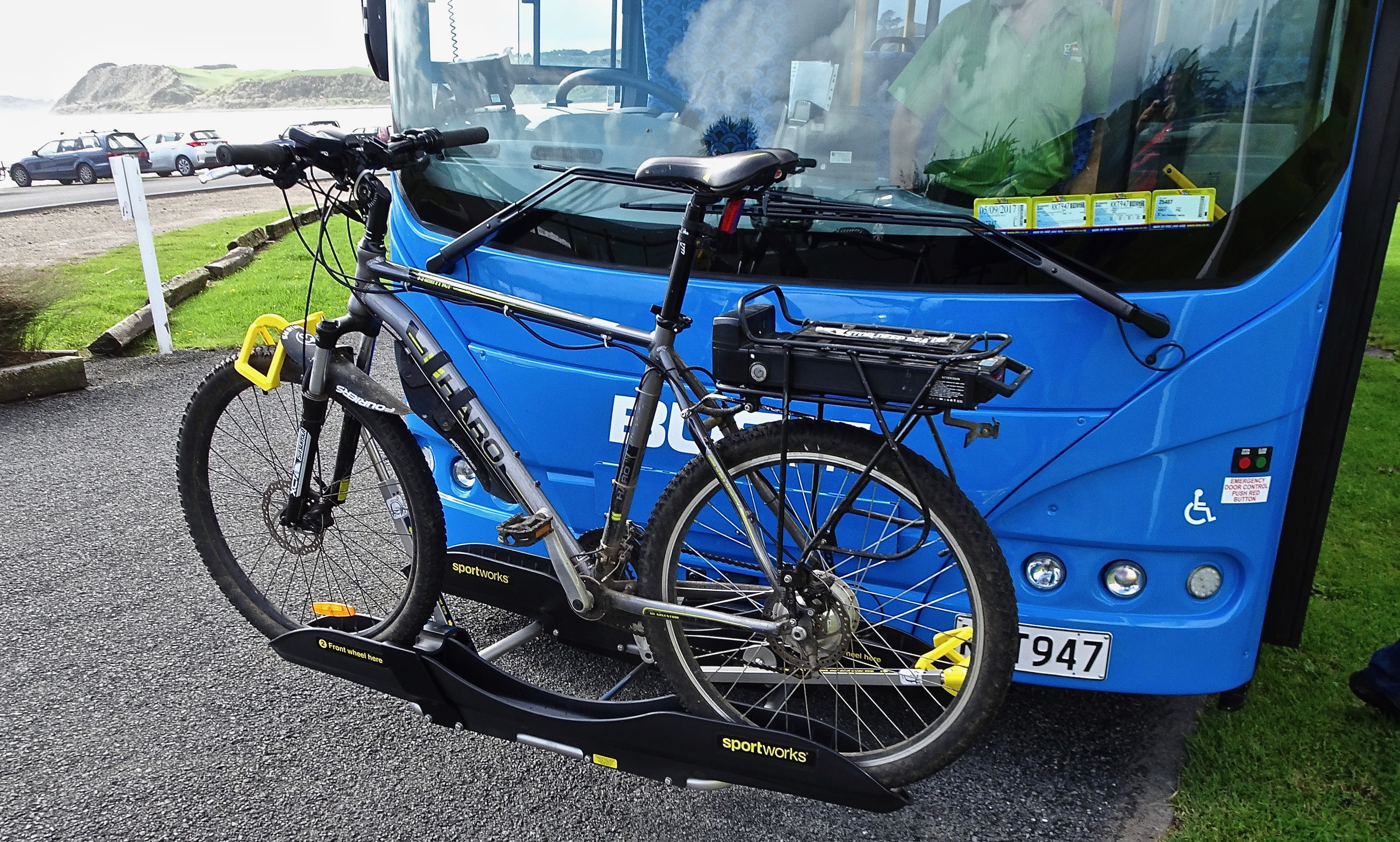
Sportworks bike carrier on a Volvo B7RLE GoBus in 2017

=== Bicycle racks ===
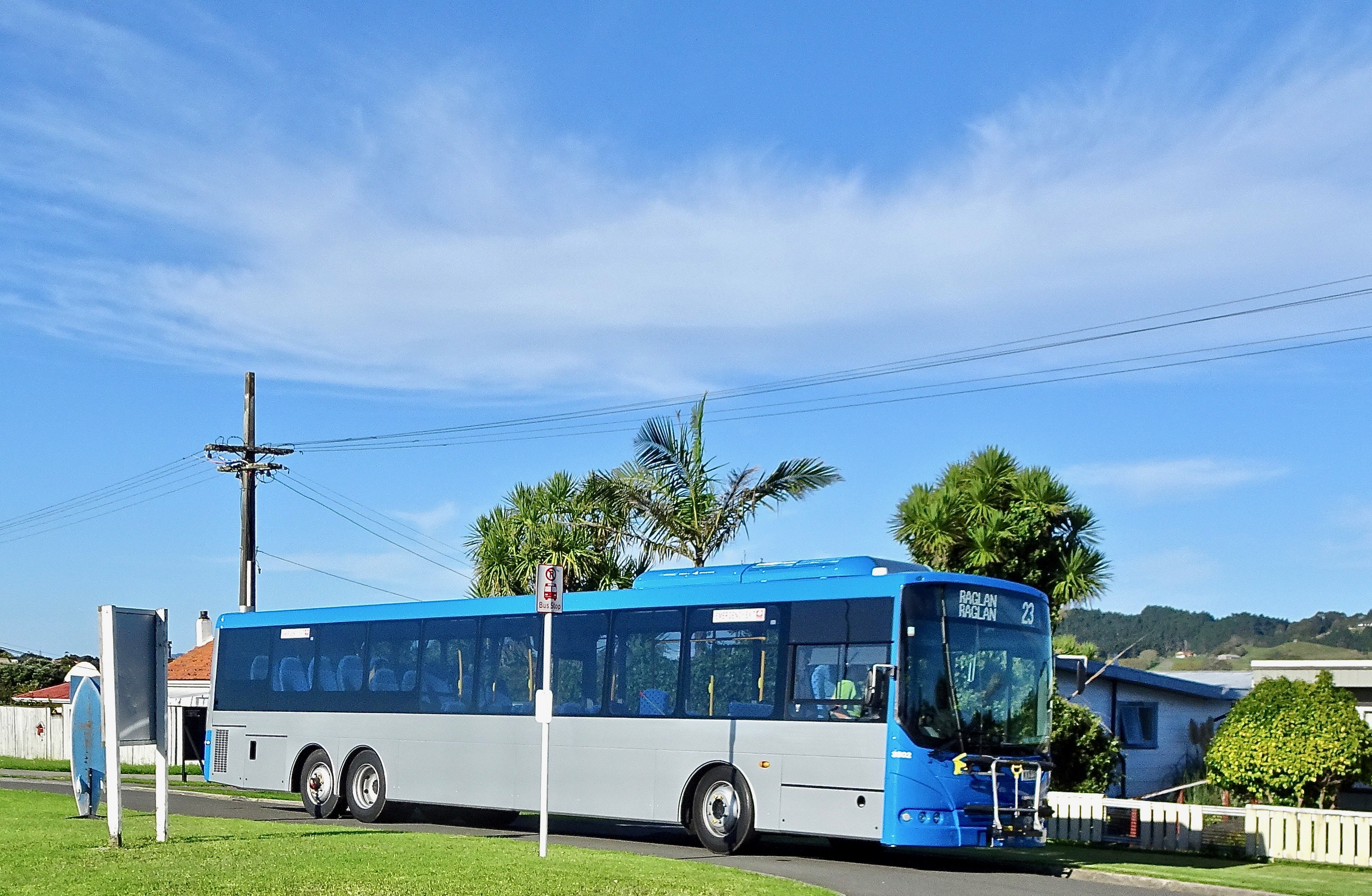
GoBus Hamilton-Huntly, Raglan and Paeroa contracts from 18 April 2017 include free wi-fi and bike racks

The camber of Bryce St at the exit from the centre was a reason for Hamilton being the largest city in the country not to carry bicycles on any of its public transport. The entrance was modified to avoid buses gouging the tar seal on Bryce St, but there is still little clearance to allow for bike racks. This probably explained why a 2011 policy to "investigate the feasibility of bikes on buses in the Waikato region" was not in the 2015 Plan. Cycle racks have been on Huntly, Paeroa and Raglan buses from 18 April 2017, Cambridge buses from late 2017 and Te Awamutu from late 2018. A Regional Council agenda recommended its Regional Public Transport Plan 2018 – 2028 should not provide for bike racks on Hamilton buses.

=== Wheelchair accessible buses ===
In 2014 $4 million spent on 10 low-floor MAN buses made the Hamilton fleet fully wheelchair accessible. A Total Mobility subsidised taxi scheme also operates in Hamilton, Taupō and Tokoroa. Local mobility schemes exist in Huntly, Raglan, Coromandel, Thames, Tairua, Whitianga, Paeroa, Morrinsville, Te Aroha, Cambridge, Te Awamutu, Tokoroa, Putāruru, Tīrau, and Te Kuiti.

=== Information technology ===
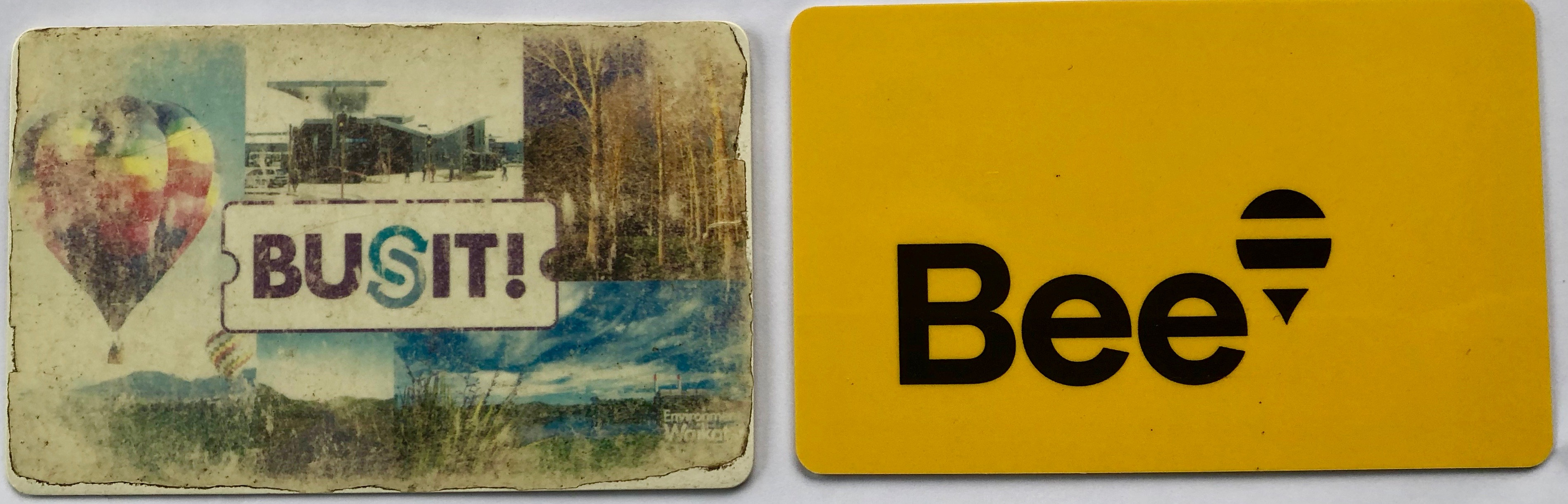
Bee cards replaced BusIt cards in Waikato on 1 July 2020

A smartcard, marketed as a BusIt Card, was introduced in 2003. It gave roughly a 30% discount. About 40,000 (10% of Waikato's population) were in use. Cards cost $5. A switch to Bee Cards was made on 1 July 2020.

In 2017/18 solar-powered, real-time arrival information boards were installed at 5 bus stops and CCTV and wifi on buses. The Transit app was introduced in 2017, allowing mobile phone users to track buses and plan journeys.

== Funding ==
When fares were increased by 12½% and buses after 6pm and all Sunday services were ended in 1971, Buses Ltd claimed to be losing about $26,000 a year. The options then mooted were tax cuts, or local or national subsidy.

Under the Public Transport Management Act 2008 (which replaced the Transport Services Licensing Act 1989), regional councils can manage bus and ferry services within their regions. Since 2013, this has been under the Public Transport Operating Model. Just over a third of operating costs come from fares.

A Passenger Transport Rate was first levied in Hamilton in 1994. In 1996 it collected $1.033m, in 1997 $1.077m, in 1998 $1.187m, in 1999 $1.275m, $1.278m in 2001, in 2001 $1.453m, in 2002 $1.519m, in 2005 $3,626m, in 2007 $5.503m, and $6.237m in 2008. By 2003 only 3 (Raglan, Te Awamutu and Thames) of 33 routes ran without subsidy. Fare revenue was $3.606m in 2007 and, after a fare increase, $4.178m in 2008. Contracted services cost $2.199m in 1995, $2.255m in 1996, $2.798m in 1997 ($1.902m bus, $0.285m mobility), $3.042m in 1999, and was estimated at $20m a year in the 2015–2025 Plan. Regional transport cost $64.62m in 2025/26, of which $8.647m came from fares.

In 2016/17 total funding was $23,34m. In 2019/20 public transport made up 4% of regional government spending on transport, less than half the 11% being spent on the Waikato Expressway. $22.4m went to bus services, $17.8m of that in Hamilton, $4m for buses from rural towns to Hamilton and $0.6m for buses in Thames, Tokoroa and Taupō. In 2020 $18.2m went to Hamilton buses, $4.2m to buses from rural towns, $1.4m for the rest of region and $6m for the new rail service.

A Regional Petrol Tax, levied in Hamilton (0.265 cents a litre in 1996), supported public transport from 1992 to 1996. A plan to reintroduce the tax was dropped in 2009, leading to a fare increase and shelving of improvements planned for increased hours, an Eastern Loop and a Rototuna Dial a Ride. The tax was also levied from 1971 to 1974.

== Staffing ==
In December 2016, it was reported that Pavlovich Coachlines passengers would receive free rides due to a worker protest.

In October 2017 First Union presented a petition to Regional Council asking for contracts with bus companies to include a requirement to pay a living wage. It was reported that some drivers were being paid the minimum wage. Drivers have been paid at Living Wage rates since 1 September 2021.

== Late running ==
In Waikato an 'on-time' service is defined as being no more than 59 seconds early and no more than 4 minutes and 59 seconds late. During 2019–2020 overall punctuality improved from 60.35% of buses to 73.3%. One route dropped as low as 21.62%, but improved when timings were eased by 10 minutes from 4 March 2019. In the second quarter of 2026, timetable adherence was 71.71%, with services arriving 1 minute and 35 seconds later than the timetabled time on average. By comparison, Auckland reported 97.8% of trips as punctual.

== History ==
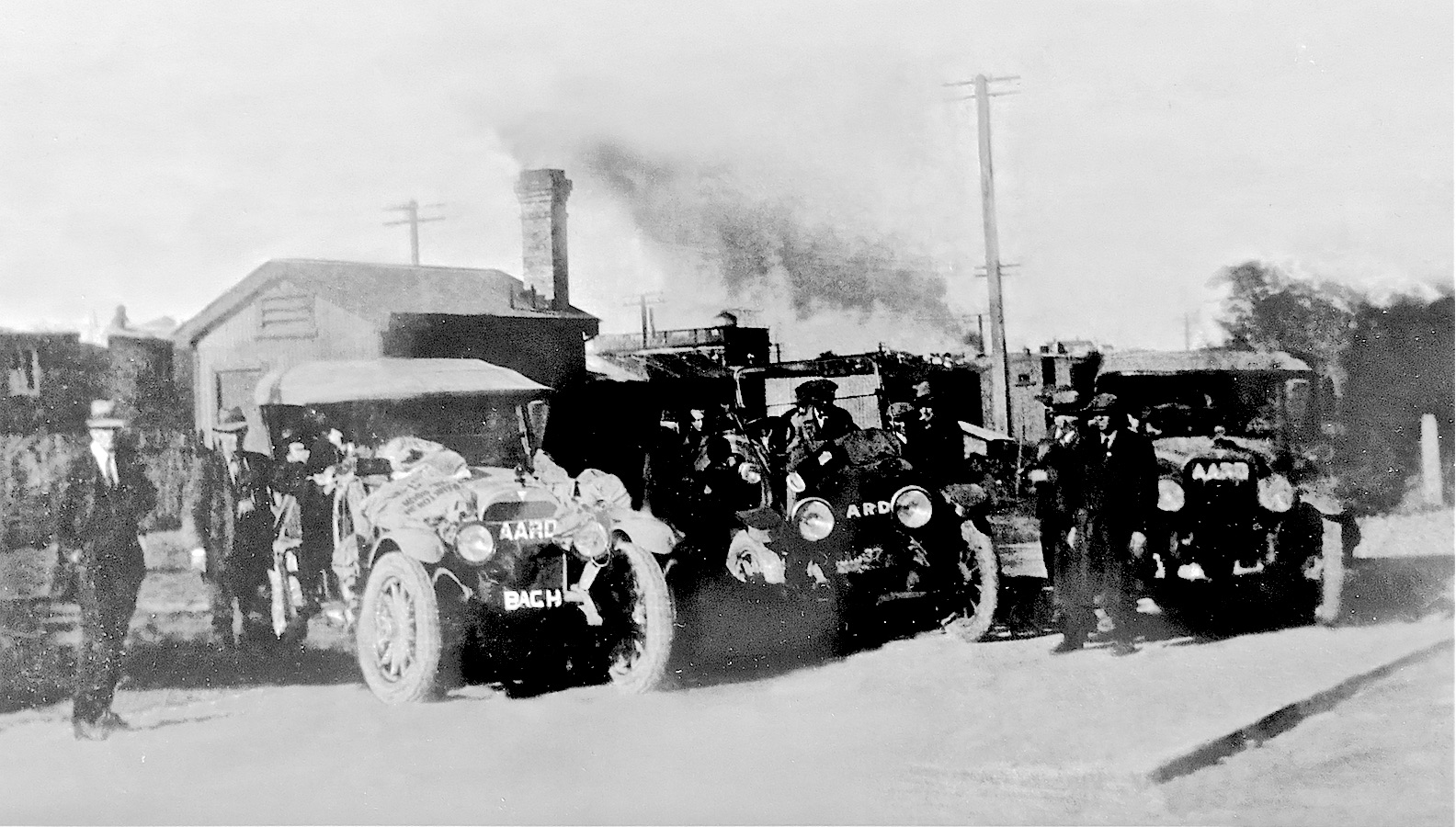
AARD Hudson buses at Frankton Junction early 1920s loaded with mailbags. Buses continued to carry parcels until at least the 1960s.

Public transport in Waikato started with ships and boats serving rivers, coastal beaches and ports. Those on the Waikato and Waipa were gradually displaced by the extending North Island Main Trunk railway and its branches. As roads developed, coaches started to link railway stations with other settlements.

From about 1915 service cars replaced coaches, though there were many accounts of poor roads (see External links). By 1924 the service car network was more extensive than the current services. In 1929 the Northern Steamship Co ended its passenger services, which had served ports such as Coromandel, Kāwhia, Port Waikato, Raglan, Tairua, Thames and Whangamata. Some services were suspended during World War 2 due to rubber and petrol shortages.

Waikato had only one passenger tram route and that just from 1871 to 1874. In 1906 Hamilton's mayor proposed a tram to link with Frankton Junction, but voters rejected it.

The Land Transport Act 1998 added transport to Regional Council's responsibilities.

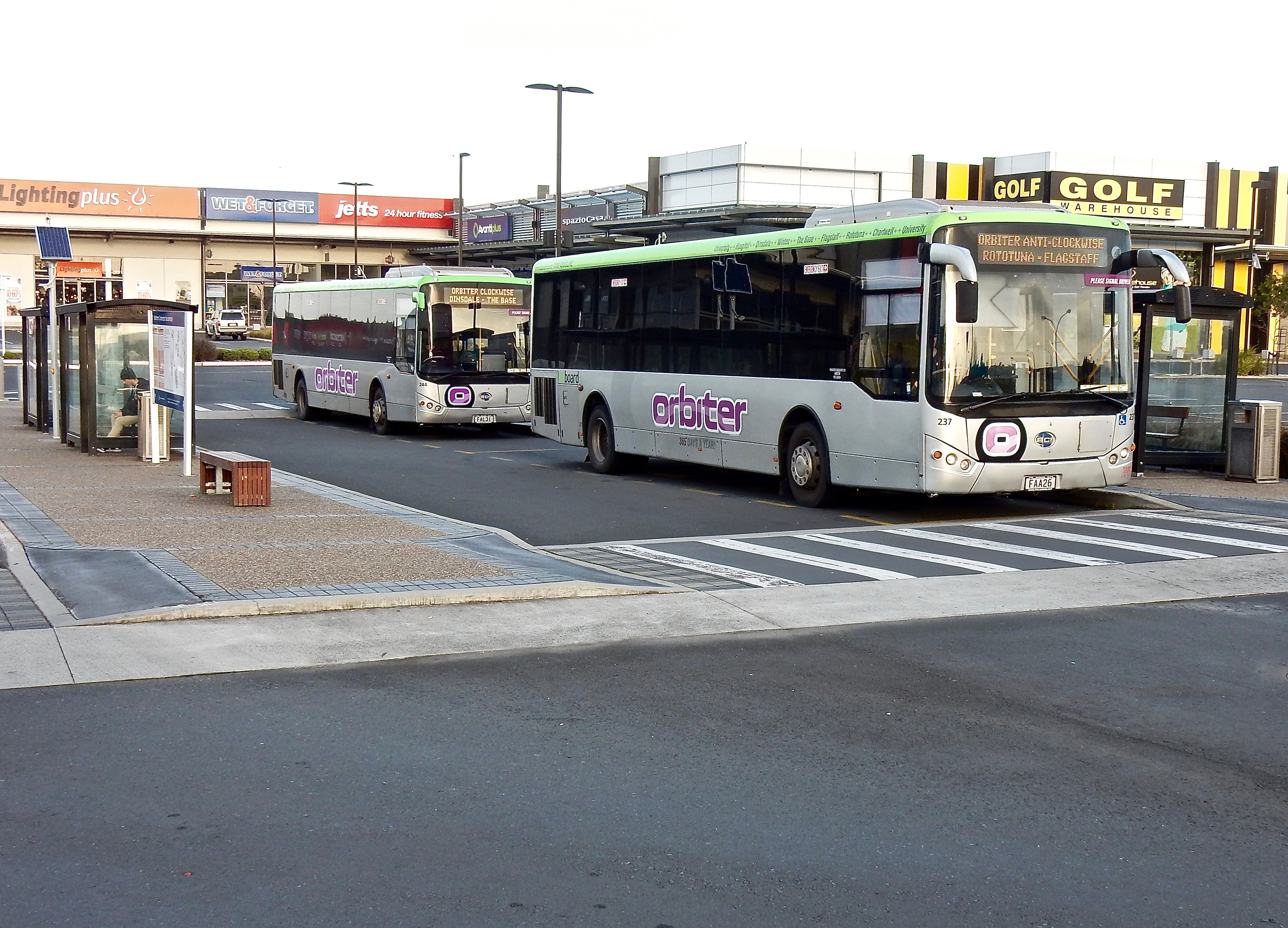
2009 39-seat BCI Orbiter buses at The Base, showing solar powered Radiola passenger information system on left, introduced in 2005

== See also (railways, etc) ==
- Public transport in New Zealand
- Railways: North Island Main Trunk, Glen Afton Branch, Glen Massey Line, East Coast Main Trunk, Cambridge Branch, Thames Branch, Kinleith Branch, Rotorua Branch.
