= The Base (shopping centre) =

Shopping centre in Hamilton, New Zealand

Coordinates: 37°44′51.27″S 175°13′54.34″E

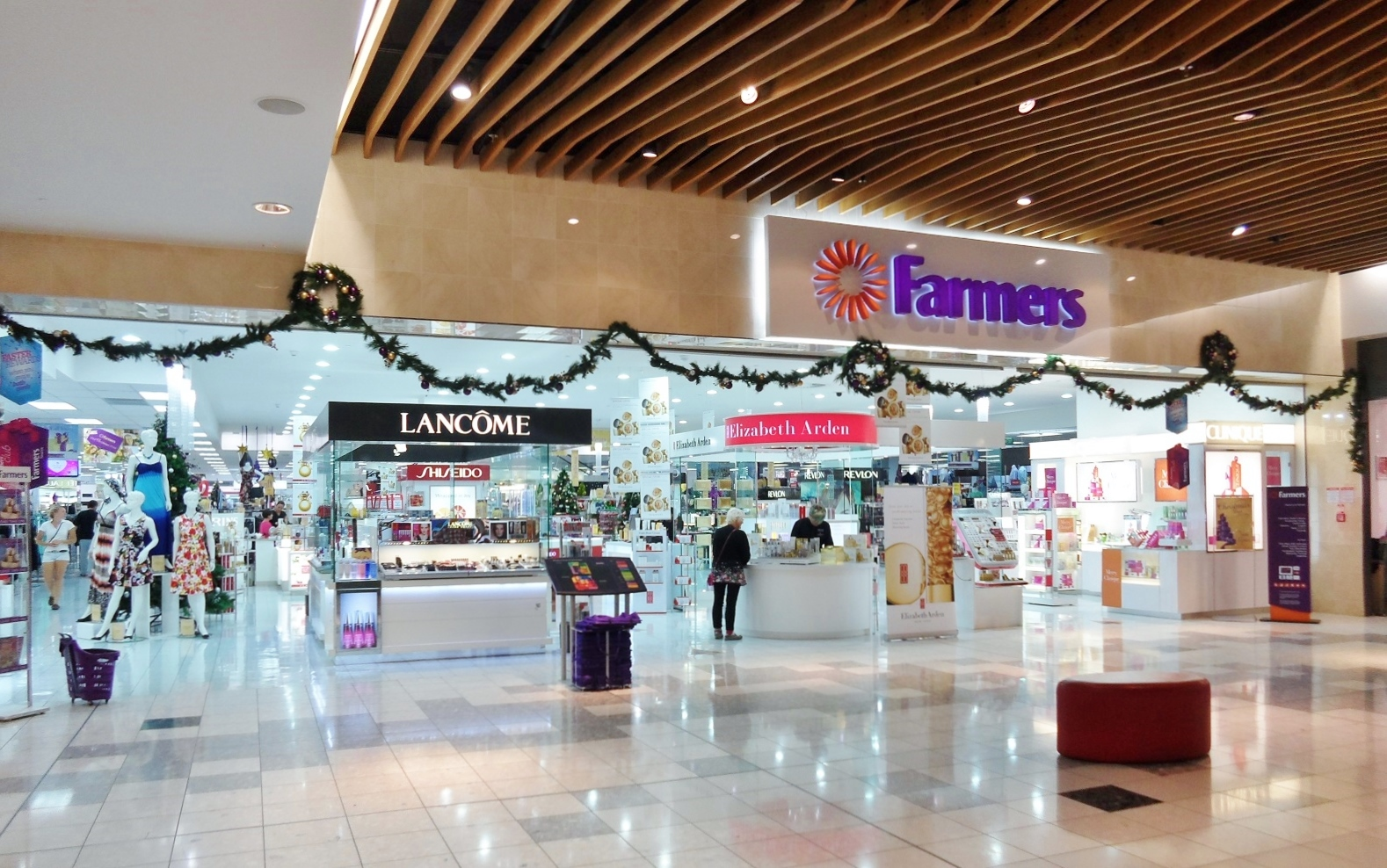
- The Base in 2013
- Location: Hamilton, New Zealand
- Address: Cnr Te Rapa Road & Avalon Drive, Te Rapa
- Opened: May 2005
- Owner: Tainui Group Holdings (50%); Kiwi Property Group (50%)
- Num. of stores: 172
- Num. of anchor tenants: 9
- Floor area: 81,000 sq m
- Website: https://www.kiwiproperty.com/the-base/

The Base is a regional shopping centre located in Te Rapa, in the New Zealand city of Hamilton. The centre consists of the original outdoor strip mall, and the more recent Te Awa enclosed shopping mall.

== History ==
The 30-hectare block of land that The Base sits on traditionally belonged to Waikato-Tainui. It was taken prior to World War II by the Crown under the Public Works Act for defence purposes, and became the Te Rapa Air Force Base (hence the name), which eventually closed in 1992. The land came back to the tribe in 1995 as part of the Waikato-Tainui Raupatu (land confiscation) settlement. It was put into what is known as Pōtatau Te Wherowhero title (named after the first Māori king), which means it can never be sold or alienated.

In 2002 Tainui Group Holdings announced that they would build a $50 million retail development that would eventually cover over 60,000 square metres of retail and commercial space. The initial resource consents were lodged, requiring a change to the Hamilton City District Plan, which the Council agreed to. However, there was a year of delays while a number of objectors appealed the Council approval to both the Environment and High Courts. Both challenges were lost and work finally began in August 2004.

In 2002 The Warehouse Group (TWG) was signed up as the anchor tenant of stage one of The Base. The first 16,000 square metres was to house one of their largest stores, and the first with the new store format that is in use today throughout the country. TWG later became part of a joint venture company with Tainui to operate the mall. In 2007, Tainui Group Holdings paid $37.4M to buy out The Warehouse Group's 50% stake in the joint venture company.

At the core of the site are three very important pou (carved poles). The first is symbolic, representing traditional guardianship of the site; the second acknowledges the recent presence of the Royal New Zealand Air Force; the third is a contemporary design that depicts the present day, and modernisation of the tribe.

The Base design was awarded a silver medal at the 2012 Asia Pacific Shopping Centre Awards in China.

== Ownership and value ==
The Base was formerly wholly owned by Tainui Group Holdings, the holding company for the assets of the Waikato-Tainui Iwi, and has been valued at over $250M. However, in 2016 NZX-listed Kiwi Property Group invested $192.5 million in acquiring a 50% stake. This investment values the property at $385 million.

== Buses ==
Previous timetabled stop	Route	Next timetabled stop
Terminus	Comet	Hamilton Transport Centre towards Waikato Hospital
Maui Street towards Terminus	01; Pukete	Hamilton Transport Centre
Terminus	18; Te Rapa	Waterworld Hamilton towards Hamilton Transport Centre
Horotiu towards Ngaruawahia	21; Huntly/Northern Connector	Hamilton Transport Centre

== See also ==
- List of shopping centres in New Zealand
- Rotokauri Public Transport Hub
