= Sylvia Park =

Coordinates: 36.915313°S 174.841415°E

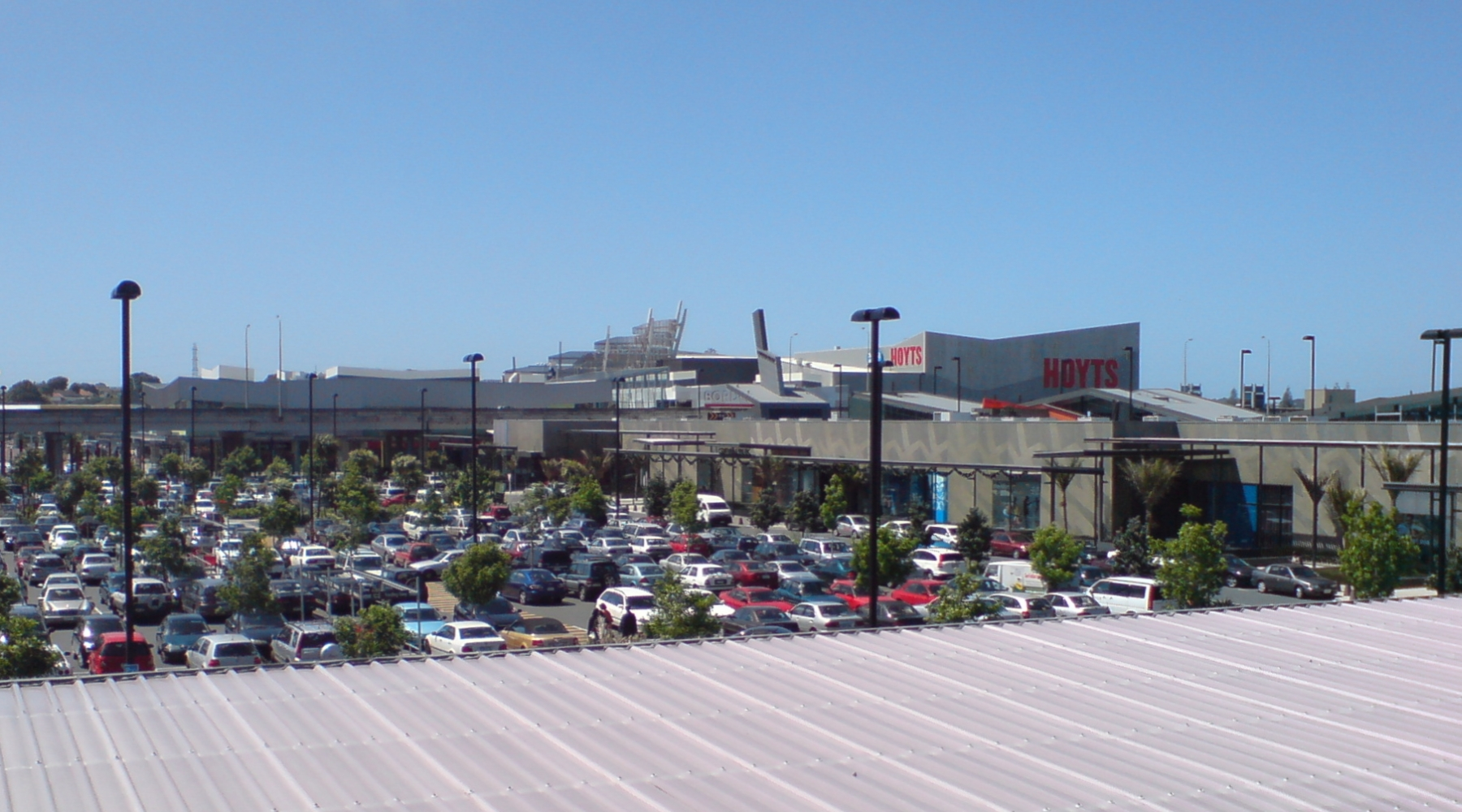
- A view over the main carpark and length of the centre, with the cinemas and railway station at the right rear
- Location: Mount Wellington, Auckland
- Address: Mount Wellington Highway
- Opened: 10 June 2006; 20 years ago
- Owner: Kiwi Property Group
- Num. of stores: 200+
- Floor area: 106,427 m^{2} (1,145,570 sq ft)
- Floors: 2
- Parking: 3,800 spaces
- Website: www.sylviapark.com

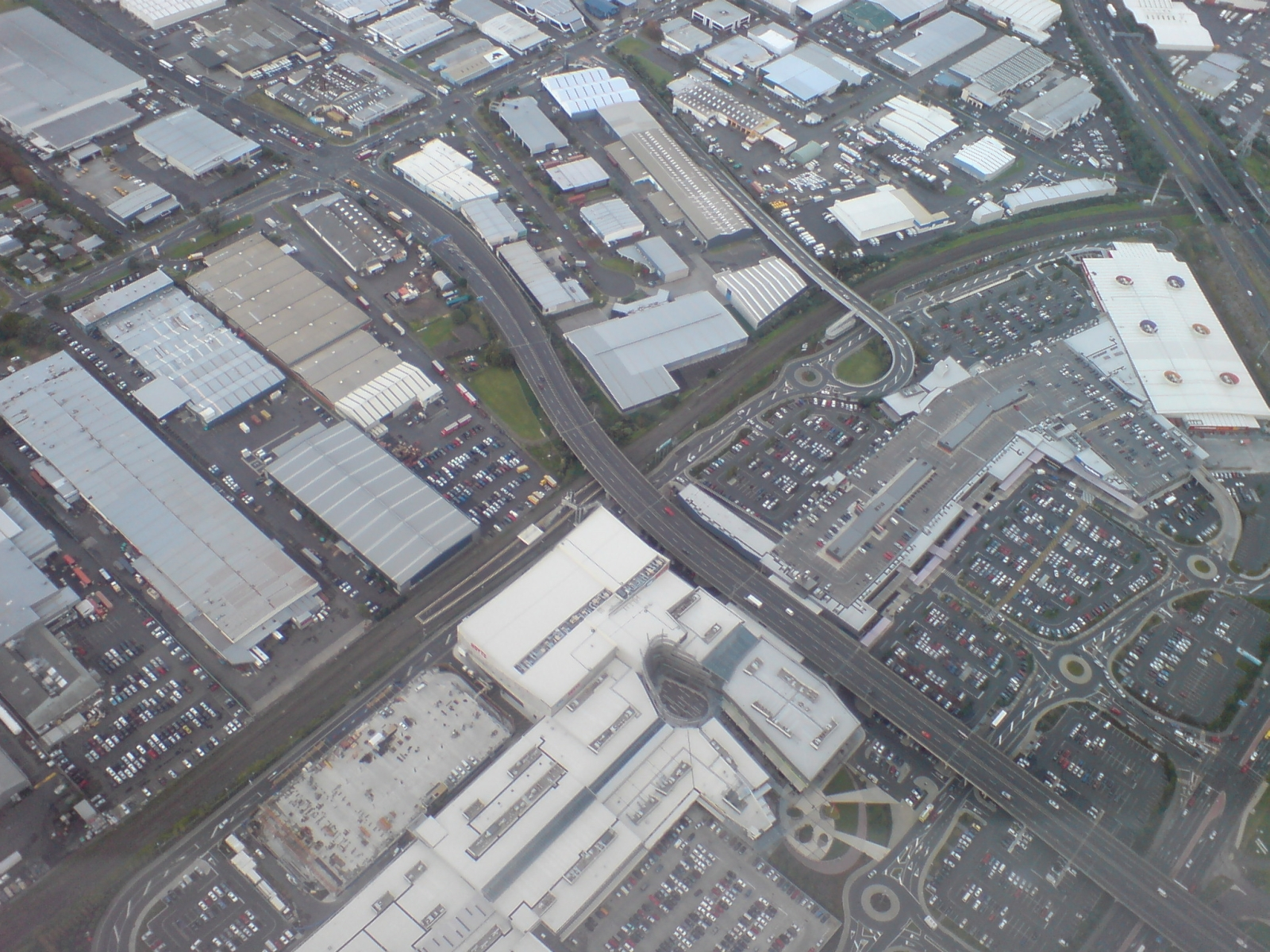
An aerial view showing most of the centre in mid-2008

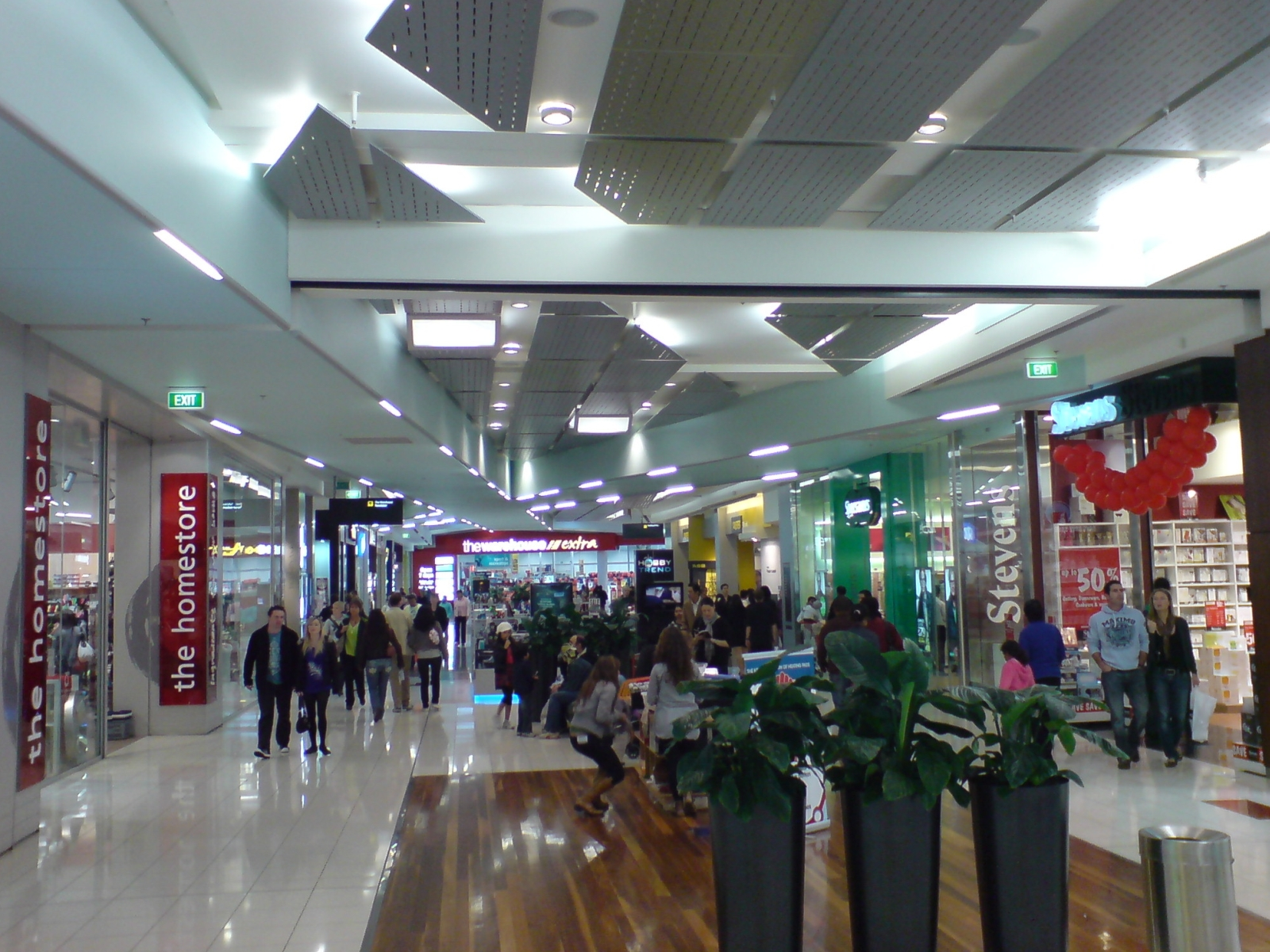
Inside, the main mall strip

Sylvia Park is a large business park and shopping centre in the Auckland suburb of Mount Wellington in New Zealand. Less commonly known, the area around the centre (which includes some residential and other commercial developments) is also called Sylvia Park (the centre takes its name from the area, not vice versa, but Sylvia Park is not officially a suburb). The area is located adjacent to two major interchanges of the Auckland Southern Motorway – the South Eastern Highway (which passes directly above the shopping centre on a flyover) and Mount Wellington Highway.

Land and store space in the Sylvia Park development is let out to a wide variety of major retailers, one cinema complex and one supermarket. In addition, the centre has franchises of all major New Zealand banks and a wide variety of other retailers. The centre employs approximately 2,500 staff.

In a rating of New Zealand shopping centres by a retail expert group in 2008, Sylvia Park received four stars, the maximum rating, based on the criteria of amount of shopping area, economic performance, amenity and appeal as well as future growth prospects. Especially praised were the wide catchment of shoppers and the motorway accessibility.

== History ==
=== Original site ===
The name Sylvia Park is from the large country house/stud farm built there in the late 19th century. It was the country residence of Sir Maurice O'Rorke, one of the first Speakers of the House. Sir Maurice used the land primarily for horse breeding. The house was demolished in the 1960s. Carbine Road is named after the racehorse Carbine who was foaled at Sylvia Park Stud.

=== Military use ===
During the Second World War the United States Joint Purchasing Board contracted the New Zealand Public Works Department to construct storage facilities on a 21.77 ha site that had originally been part of the Sylvia Park Stud. 48 storehouses, each 46 x 37 m, were constructed between April 1943 and May 1944. The 48 buildings were linked by a system of interconnecting sealed roads and serviced by a 3.2-km railway siding, built onsite. The total cost of the stores, the largest built in Auckland, was £425,922 (around $34,000,000 in 2011).

As the United States Forces reduced their presence after the war the New Zealand Army began to occupy the site from 1946 as a storage area with full occupancy achieved in 1948. During its time at a New Zealand Military installation Sylvia Park would be the home to a number of units including a RNZAOC Vehicle Depot, a RNZEME Field Workshop and a RNZAMC Field Hospital. By 1992 the site had outlived its usefulness as a military installation and the New Zealand government sold the Sylvia Park site for $7 million. The buildings, which gradually became empty, were demolished for the shopping mall.

The Waitangi Tribunal called the sale of Sylvia Park "a fraud by any fair law".

=== Development ===
The development is owned by Sylvia Park Business Centre Ltd (SPBCL), a subsidiary of Kiwi Property Group. The development is situated on 24 hectares of land, a large part of which is still to be developed as of the late 2000s. Kiwi Property acquired the land in two transactions in 1995.

However, the land was at that stage zoned for industrial use by the Auckland City Council. The developers asked the council to modify the District Plan to allow high-density commercial use, a change which the council supported, and drafted into "Plan Change 4". However, the plan change was opposed by the Ngati Maru Iwi authority, which represents Māori interests in the area. A December 2001 decision of the Environment Court of New Zealand confirmed the plan change. Demolition and construction began in 2004, with retail construction beginning in 2005.

==== Opening issues ====
Stage One of the development opened to the public on 6 June 2006. The opening received nationwide television and radio coverage the day before, as the development is one of the largest in New Zealand. This resulted in a very high shopper turnout on the opening day, and despite planning by SPBCL, caused severe gridlock on the notoriously busy Auckland Southern Motorway as well as major arterial routes in the vicinity of the centre, including the South-Eastern and Mount Wellington Highways. Transit New Zealand and SPBCL took the unusual step of recommending people postpone trips to the mall. As part of the conditions of being granted planning permission SPBCL was required to manage traffic flows to the site, and had the traffic jams continued would have faced an accelerated timetable for upgrading key roads. The congestion did force SPBCL to implement a traffic monitoring programme ahead of schedule. Stage Two of the development opened in August 2006 and expanded the fashion, beauty and food retailers of the centre.

In contrast to the initial interest, weekday retail sales were soon considered to be flagging, with the centre being nicknamed 'Spooky Park' by some. The owners noted that this did not extend to weekend sales, and that the centre had in the meantime gained during the weekdays as well.

The centre is today one of New Zealand's busiest malls, attracting over 12 million customers per year. Kiwi Property is currently investigating plans to undertake a $150 million expansion of the centre.

==== Expansion ====
Stage Three was opened 29 March 2007, and included a cinema (along with the biggest 35 mm permanent movie screen in the world, according to the Guinness World Records), Borders bookstore, 45 new stores, bars and restaurants, and 26 stores which were either new to New Zealand or did not yet have stores in shopping centres.

Stage Four opened in June 2007, and finished the retail area of the centre, which now has 200 shops covering 6.5 hectares (700,000 ft^{2}) of indoors space and is valued at NZ$450 million.

The opening of the relocated Sylvia Park railway station in July 2007, directly adjacent to the eastern side of the shopping centre, as required by the resource consent of the centre, links Sylvia Park to the Auckland rail network via the Eastern Line (pre-CRL). Since the opening of the City Rail Link on 13 September 2026, Sylvia Park is served by East West line trains at least every 15 minutes on weekdays from each direction.

A residential expansion within the shopping centre and business park's grounds opened in July 2024 with 295 build-to-rent apartments.

On 4 December 2025, IKEA opened its first New Zealand store at Sylvia Park. The 34,000-square-metre (370,000 sq ft) store includes free parking, a Swedish Bistro, Swedish Restaurant, Swedish Food Market, as well as a Småland kids play area.

== Plans ==
The opening of Stage Five was planned for 2008 and to add NZ$200 million of office space in four separate buildings. Kiwi Income noted that it had always planned to develop offices around the perimeter of the centre, but had delayed this until the retail was starting to take off. Kiwi Property have begun the $280 million expansion, which sees the construction of a nine-floor office block and 20,000 square meters of addition retail space. It opened on 15 October 2020.

== See also ==
- List of shopping centres in New Zealand
