= Ashmore, New Zealand =

Ashmore
- Suburb
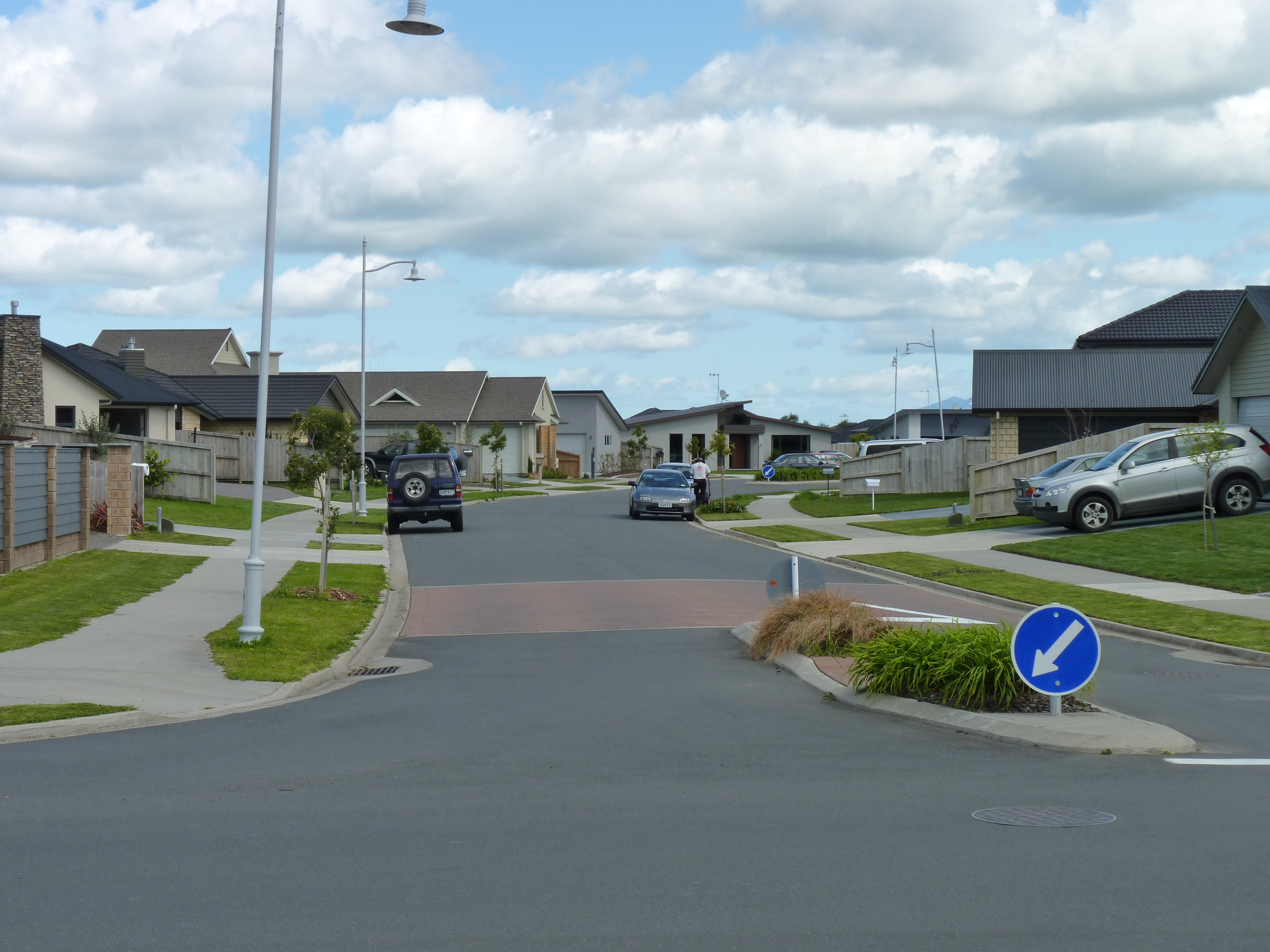
- Neighbourhood in Ashmore, Hamilton.
- Interactive map of Ashmore
- Coordinates: 37.726140°S 175.263347°E
- Country: New Zealand
- City: Hamilton, New Zealand
- Electoral ward: Hamilton East

| | Horsham Downs |
| Magellan Rise | Ashmore | Somerset Heights |
| | Rototuna |

Ashmore is a name used for a suburb in north-eastern Hamilton in New Zealand by Hamilton City Council on its 2010 map and by the developer, CDL Land New Zealand Limited. It is more commonly described as being part of Rototuna North. It is in Rototuna Central census area.

== See also ==
- Suburbs of Hamilton, New Zealand
