= Queenwood =

Suburb of Hamilton, New Zealand

- Suburb
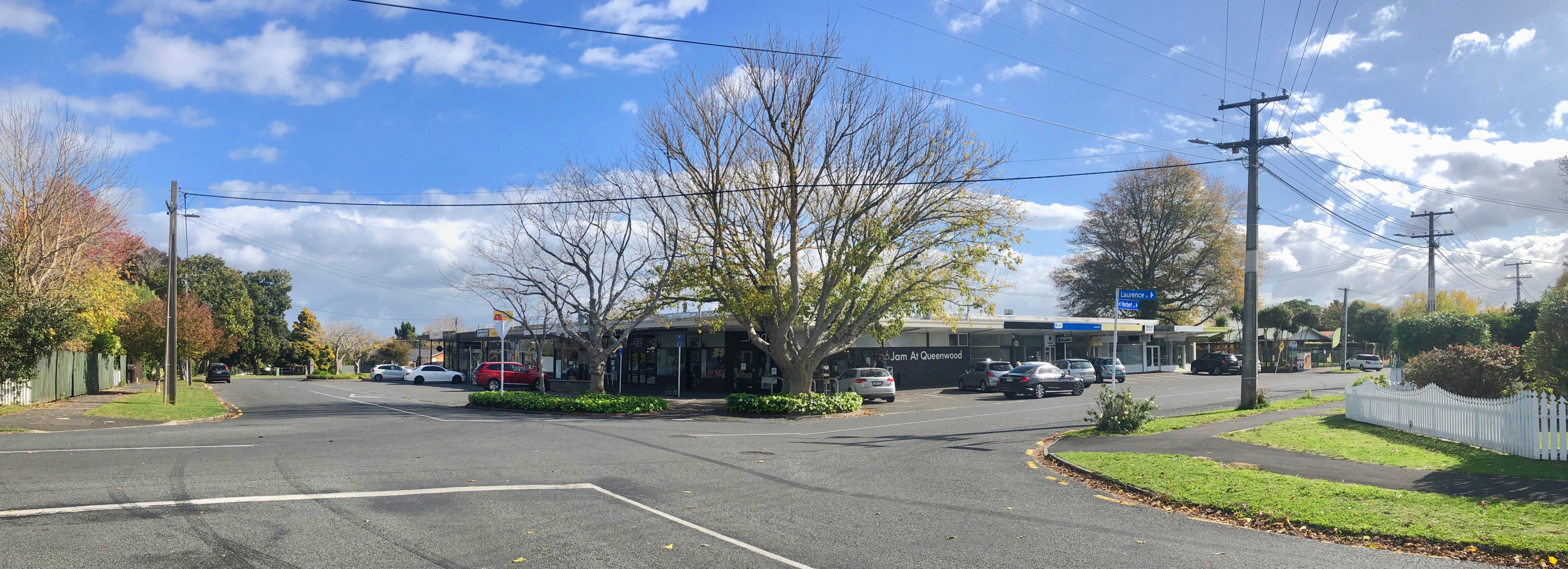
- Queenwood Rd and shopping area
- Interactive map of Queenwood
- Coordinates: 37°44′52.37″S 175°15′56.24″E
- Country: New Zealand
- City: Hamilton, New Zealand
- Local authority: Hamilton City Council
- Electoral ward: East Ward

Area
  - Land: 149 ha (370 acres)

Population (June 2025)
  - Total: 2,600
  - Density: 1,700/km^{2} (4,500/sq mi)

Pukete	Flagstaff	Rototuna
St Andrews	Queenwood	Chartwell
	River Road

Queenwood is a suburb in northern Hamilton in New Zealand. This place is separated by Chartwell Park from Chartwell. It is mostly a residential area, with the typical range of local shops. It is located between River Road and Hukanui Road.

== Demographics ==
Queenwood statistical area, which also includes Harrowfield, covers 1.49 km^{2} (0.58 sq mi) and had an estimated population of 2,600 as of June 2025, with a population density of 1,745 people per km^{2}.

Historical population
Year	Pop.	±% p.a.
2006	2,238	—
2013	2,265	+0.17%
2018	2,382	+1.01%
2023	2,436	+0.45%

Queenwood had a population of 2,436 in the 2023 New Zealand census, an increase of 54 people (2.3%) since the 2018 census, and an increase of 171 people (7.5%) since the 2013 census. There were 1,167 males, 1,260 females and 9 people of other genders in 888 dwellings. 3.4% of people identified as LGBTIQ+. The median age was 38.5 years (compared with 38.1 years nationally). There were 444 people (18.2%) aged under 15 years, 471 (19.3%) aged 15 to 29, 1,131 (46.4%) aged 30 to 64, and 390 (16.0%) aged 65 or older.

People could identify as more than one ethnicity. The results were 75.7% European (Pākehā); 16.4% Māori; 4.2% Pasifika; 15.4% Asian; 1.1% Middle Eastern, Latin American and African New Zealanders (MELAA); and 2.6% other, which includes people giving their ethnicity as "New Zealander". English was spoken by 95.0%, Māori language by 4.3%, Samoan by 0.4%, and other languages by 17.0%. No language could be spoken by 2.0% (e.g. too young to talk). New Zealand Sign Language was known by 0.4%. The percentage of people born overseas was 26.6, compared with 28.8% nationally.

Religious affiliations were 31.7% Christian, 1.2% Hindu, 0.6% Islam, 0.4% Māori religious beliefs, 1.4% Buddhist, 0.4% New Age, 0.2% Jewish, and 2.2% other religions. People who answered that they had no religion were 55.5%, and 6.5% of people did not answer the census question.

Of those at least 15 years old, 723 (36.3%) people had a bachelor's or higher degree, 951 (47.7%) had a post-high school certificate or diploma, and 315 (15.8%) people exclusively held high school qualifications. The median income was $50,900, compared with $41,500 nationally. 345 people (17.3%) earned over $100,000 compared to 12.1% nationally. The employment status of those at least 15 was that 1,107 (55.6%) people were employed full-time, 273 (13.7%) were part-time, and 60 (3.0%) were unemployed.

== See also ==
- List of streets in Hamilton
- Suburbs of Hamilton, New Zealand
