= Somerset Heights =

Coordinates: 37°43′38.94″S 175°16′58.04″E

- Suburb
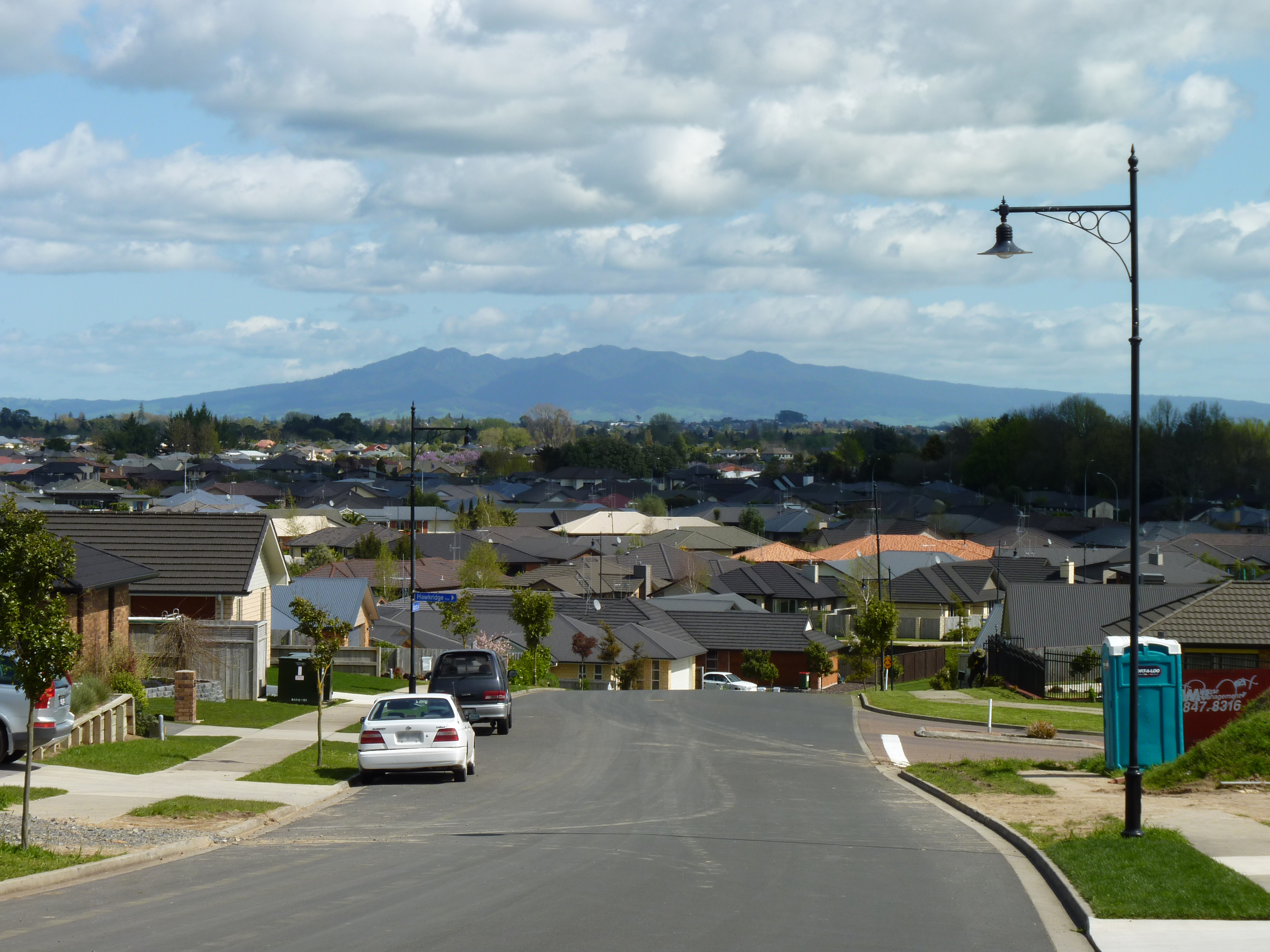
- Somerset Heights, with Mount Pirongia on the horizon.
- Interactive map of Somerset Heights
- Country: New Zealand
- City: Hamilton, New Zealand
- Electoral ward: Hamilton East
- Established: 2000

	Horsham Downs
Rototuna	Somerset Heights	Puketaha
	Huntington

Somerset Heights is a suburb in north-eastern Hamilton in New Zealand, often known as Huntington, or Rototuna. The name Rototuna is also often used to include Grosvenor, Callum Brae, Huntington and St James. Somerset Heights forms part of Te Manatu census area.

In 2000 Somerset Heights Ltd got consent for 107 houses on 13.1 ha (32 acres). Buchanan Place and Westbury Mews were named by Somerset Heights Joint Venture in 2002, using classical English names. A transmission line was taken down and replaced by a cable under Barrington Drive to allow Somerset Heights to be built.

The Thomas Homestead at 219 Gordonton Road was built in 1929 on 100 acres (40 ha), part of which is now Somerset Heights.

The Rototuna Circular bus has provided a half hourly service through the area since 2018.

Waikato Waldorf school and Te Manatu Park are on the edge of Somerset Heights.

Alligator weed was a problem in the Somerset Heights sediment pond, requiring it to be dredged in September 2005. Somerset Heights is at the head of Kirikiriroa gully, where cabbage trees, grey willow, hawthorn, Astelia grandis, whekiponga and ferns grow. The area covered wooded sites increased due to vegetation restoration, such as that around the pond.

== See also ==
- Suburbs of Hamilton, New Zealand
