= Harrowfield =

Suburb of Hamilton, New Zealand

- Suburb
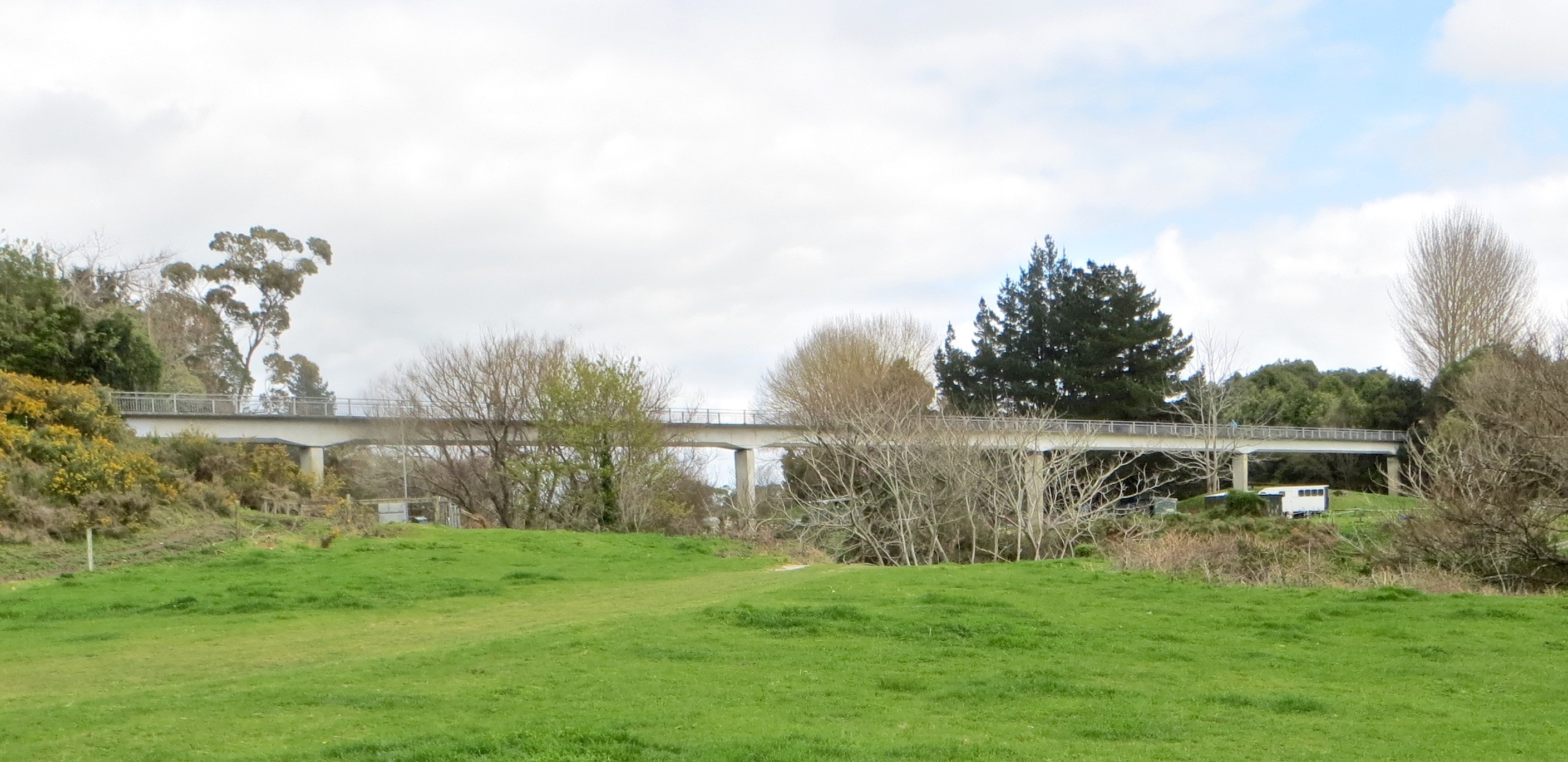
- Sewer bridge over the Kirikiriroa Stream carries a walkway/cycleway linking Harrowfield with Queenwood
- Interactive map of Harrowfield
- Coordinates: 37°44′30.5″S 175°15′31.67″E
- Country: New Zealand
- City: Hamilton, New Zealand
- Local authority: Hamilton City Council
- Electoral ward: East Ward
- Established: 1980s

Area
  - Land: 42 ha (100 acres)

Population (2023 Census)
  - Total: 579
  - Density: 1,400/km^{2} (3,600/sq mi)

St Petersburg	Flagstaff	Rototuna
Pukete	Harrowfield	Callum Brae
St Andrews	Beerescourt	Queenwood

Harrowfield is a suburb in eastern Hamilton in New Zealand. It was built in about 1991.

Part of Tauhara Park borders the suburb. The park has a mini golf area, a playground, sports fields and walkway/cycleway paths, which connect Harrowfield to the Kirikiriroa Stream valley, Queenwood and Flagstaff. Some of the park, on the far side of Wairere Drive, covers the old Rototuna landfill. Since the late 1990s, much of the leachate from the landfill has been collected for disposal at Pukete sewage works. However residents were expressing concerns about it in 2012.

Christmas lights in the suburb attract many visitors.

In 2017, development of a further 22 dwellings, including 8 duplexes, was approved. Previous developments were on plots of around 1,200 m^{2} (13,000 sq ft), rather than the higher 320 m^{2} (3,400 sq ft) density of the new one, which backs on to Wairere Drive.

== Demographics ==
Harrowfield is marked on the 1:50,000 map and is referred to as a suburb in its own right, but as a census area it is part of Queenwood.

Harrowfield covers 0.42 km^{2} (0.16 sq mi)

Historical population
Year	Pop.	±% p.a.
2006	474	—
2013	471	−0.09%
2018	438	−1.44%
2023	579	+5.74%

Harrowfield had a population of 579 in the 2023 New Zealand census, an increase of 141 people (32.2%) since the 2018 census, and an increase of 108 people (22.9%) since the 2013 census. There were 273 males and 306 females in 207 dwellings. 2.1% of people identified as LGBTIQ+. There were 96 people (16.6%) aged under 15 years, 120 (20.7%) aged 15 to 29, 258 (44.6%) aged 30 to 64, and 105 (18.1%) aged 65 or older.

People could identify as more than one ethnicity. The results were 75.1% European (Pākehā), 13.5% Māori, 2.1% Pasifika, 19.7% Asian, and 3.6% other, which includes people giving their ethnicity as "New Zealander". English was spoken by 94.8%, Māori language by 3.6%, Samoan by 1.0%, and other languages by 21.2%. No language could be spoken by 1.6% (e.g. too young to talk). The percentage of people born overseas was 28.0, compared with 28.8% nationally.

Religious affiliations were 36.3% Christian, 1.6% Hindu, 1.6% Islam, 1.6% Buddhist, 0.5% Jewish, and 3.1% other religions. 49.7% of people answered that they had no religion, and 5.7% did not answer the census question.

Of those at least 15 years old, 174 (36.0%) had a bachelor's or higher degree, 243 (50.3%) had a postsecondary certificate or diploma, and 66 (13.7%) had only a high school diploma. 93 people (19.3%) earned over $100,000 compared to 12.1% nationally. The employment status of those aged 15 or older was that 267 (55.3%) were employed full-time, 69 (14.3%) were employed part-time, and 18 (3.7%) were unemployed.

	meshblock 0952109 south/ SA1 7011948				0952108 centre/ SA1 7011947				0952107 north/ SA1 7011946				National median income
Year	Pop	Average age	Households	Median income	Pop	Average age	Households	Median income	Pop	Average age	Households	Median income	National median income
2001	204	43.1	63	$27,900	129	44.5	45	$32,000	156	38.3	54	$35,000	$18,500
2006	174	49	63	$43,800	132	48	45	$33,800	165	44	57	$44,000	$24,100
2013	168	53.3	66	$43,800	117	50.2	45	$36,700	186	47.5	63	$33,800	$27,900
2018	174	49.3	66	$53,300	117	49.0	45	$44,600	147	52.3	66	$44,800	$31,800
2023	189	42.3	66	$57,200	120	45.4	45	$50,700	270	37.3	96	$59,400	$41,500

== See also ==
- List of streets in Hamilton
- Suburbs of Hamilton, New Zealand
