= Magellan Rise =

Magellan Rise may refer to:

- Magellan Rise (ocean plateau), an oceanic plateau in the Pacific Ocean.
- Magellan Rise, New Zealand, a suburb of Hamilton, New Zealand
- North Magellan Rise, an ocean floor feature south west of Hawaii and east of the Marshall Islands
- Former name for Magellan Seamounts
