= St Andrews, Hamilton =

Suburb of Hamilton, New Zealand

St Andrews
- Suburb
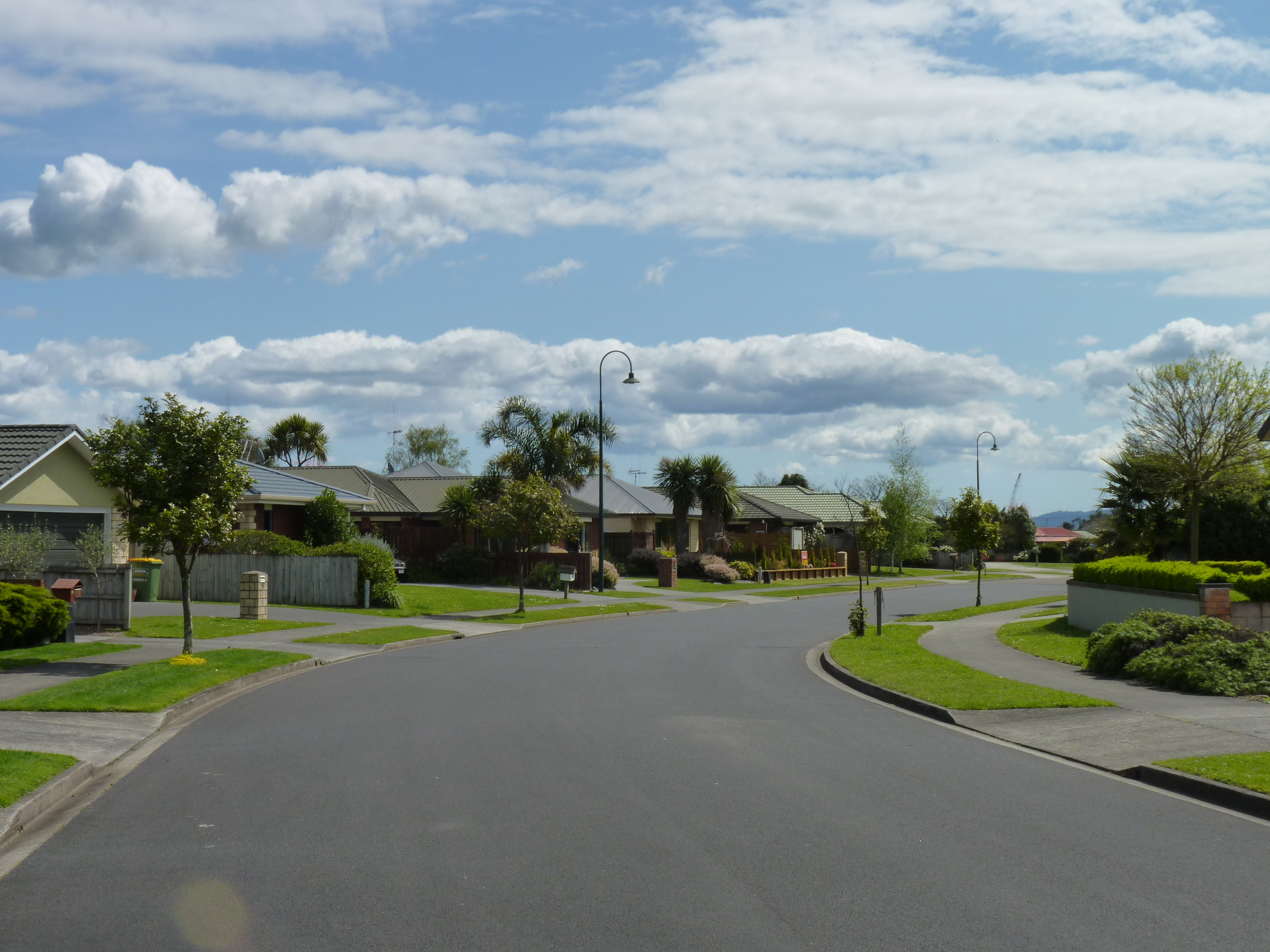
- A neighbourhood in St Andrews, Hamilton
- Interactive map of St Andrews
- Coordinates: 37°45′8.31″S 175°15′19.7″E
- Country: New Zealand
- City: Hamilton, New Zealand
- Local authority: Hamilton City Council
- Electoral ward: West Ward

Area
  - Land: 260 ha (640 acres)

Population (June 2025)
  - Total: 6,010
  - Density: 2,300/km^{2} (6,000/sq mi)

Pukete	Flagstaff	Harrowfield
Te Rapa	St Andrews	Queenwood
Forest Lake	Beerescourt	Chartwell

St Andrews is a suburb in north-western Hamilton in New Zealand. One of its main features is an 18-hole golf course built on an old flood plain on the west bank of the Waikato River. This area was regularly flooded before the construction of the Karapiro HEP dam further up river.

== Demographics ==
Saint Andrews covers 2.60 km^{2} (1.00 sq mi) and had an estimated population of 6,010 as of June 2025, with a population density of 2,312 people per km^{2}.

Historical population
Year	Pop.	±% p.a.
2006	5,151	—
2013	4,998	−0.43%
2018	5,361	+1.41%
2023	5,577	+0.79%

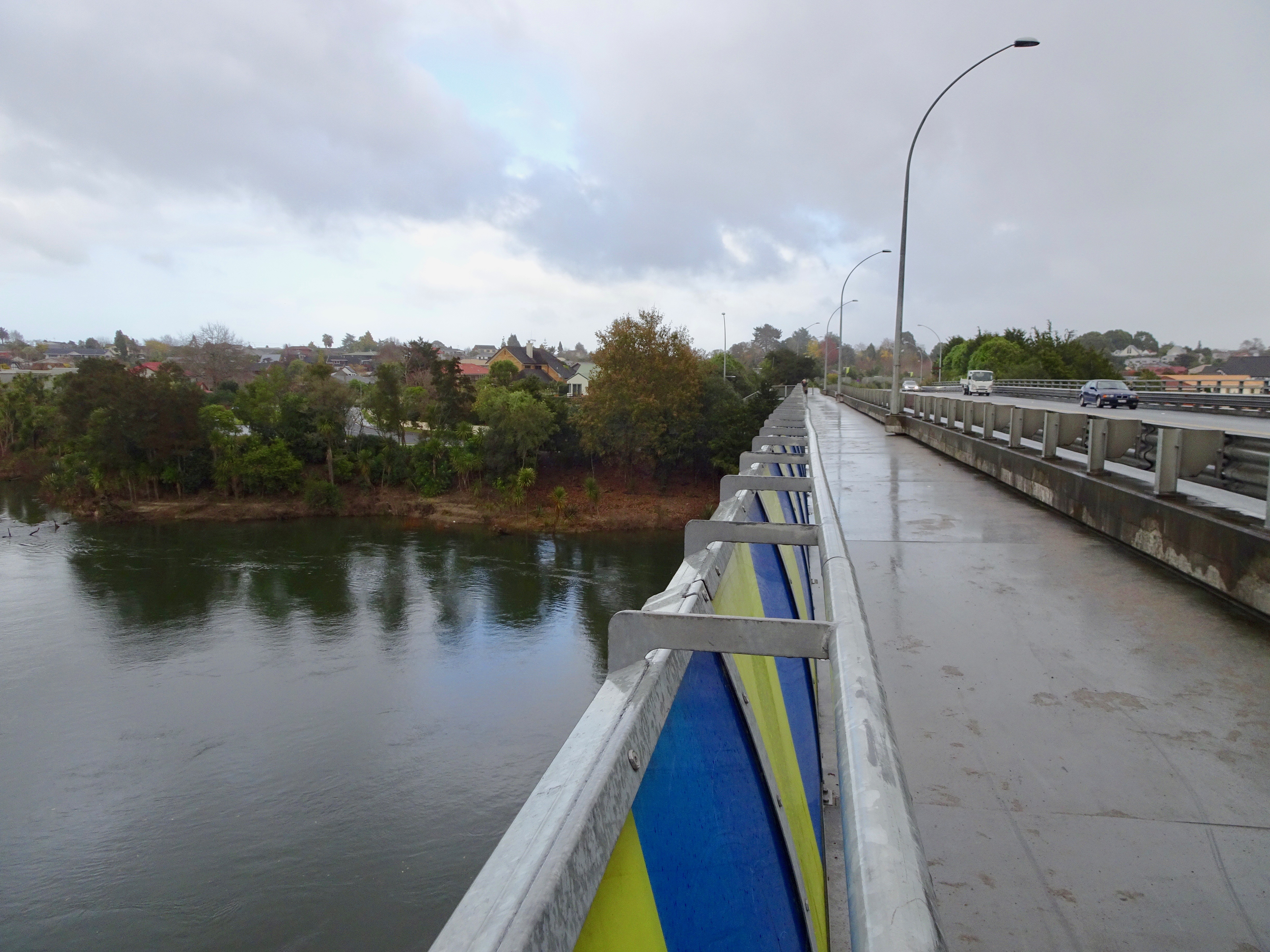
St Andrews from Pukete Bridge

Saint Andrews had a population of 5,577 in the 2023 New Zealand census, an increase of 216 people (4.0%) since the 2018 census, and an increase of 579 people (11.6%) since the 2013 census. There were 2,697 males, 2,850 females and 30 people of other genders in 2,055 dwellings. 3.5% of people identified as LGBTIQ+. The median age was 35.6 years (compared with 38.1 years nationally). There were 1,071 people (19.2%) aged under 15 years, 1,140 (20.4%) aged 15 to 29, 2,484 (44.5%) aged 30 to 64, and 882 (15.8%) aged 65 or older.

People could identify as more than one ethnicity. The results were 68.0% European (Pākehā); 26.5% Māori; 5.9% Pasifika; 14.7% Asian; 1.6% Middle Eastern, Latin American and African New Zealanders (MELAA); and 1.9% other, which includes people giving their ethnicity as "New Zealander". English was spoken by 94.7%, Māori language by 6.3%, Samoan by 0.8%, and other languages by 14.0%. No language could be spoken by 2.4% (e.g. too young to talk). New Zealand Sign Language was known by 0.4%. The percentage of people born overseas was 21.7, compared with 28.8% nationally.

Religious affiliations were 30.4% Christian, 3.6% Hindu, 0.9% Islam, 1.5% Māori religious beliefs, 0.9% Buddhist, 0.4% New Age, 0.1% Jewish, and 2.9% other religions. People who answered that they had no religion were 52.6%, and 7.0% of people did not answer the census question.

Of those at least 15 years old, 1,098 (24.4%) people had a bachelor's or higher degree, 2,286 (50.7%) had a post-high school certificate or diploma, and 1,128 (25.0%) people exclusively held high school qualifications. The median income was $45,200, compared with $41,500 nationally. 498 people (11.1%) earned over $100,000 compared to 12.1% nationally. The employment status of those at least 15 was that 2,439 (54.1%) people were employed full-time, 510 (11.3%) were part-time, and 141 (3.1%) were unemployed.

Individual statistical areas
Name	Area (km^{2})	Population	Density (per km^{2})	Dwellings	Median age	Median income
Saint Andrews West	1.01	2,997	2,967	1,023	32.7 years	$43,300
Saint Andrews East	1.59	2,577	1,621	1,029	40.7 years	$47,600
New Zealand					38.1 years	$41,500

== Education ==
St Andrews Middle School is a school catering for years 7–10. It has 142 students. It opened as an intermediate school in 1977 and expanded to cover years 9 and 10. It has previously had the name Hamilton Junior High School.

Hamilton North School is a special school catering for students with intellectual disabilities. It has 167 students.

Both these schools are coeducational. Rolls are as of March 2026.

== See also ==
- List of streets in Hamilton
- Suburbs of Hamilton, New Zealand
