= Rototuna =

Suburb of Hamilton, New Zealand

- Suburb
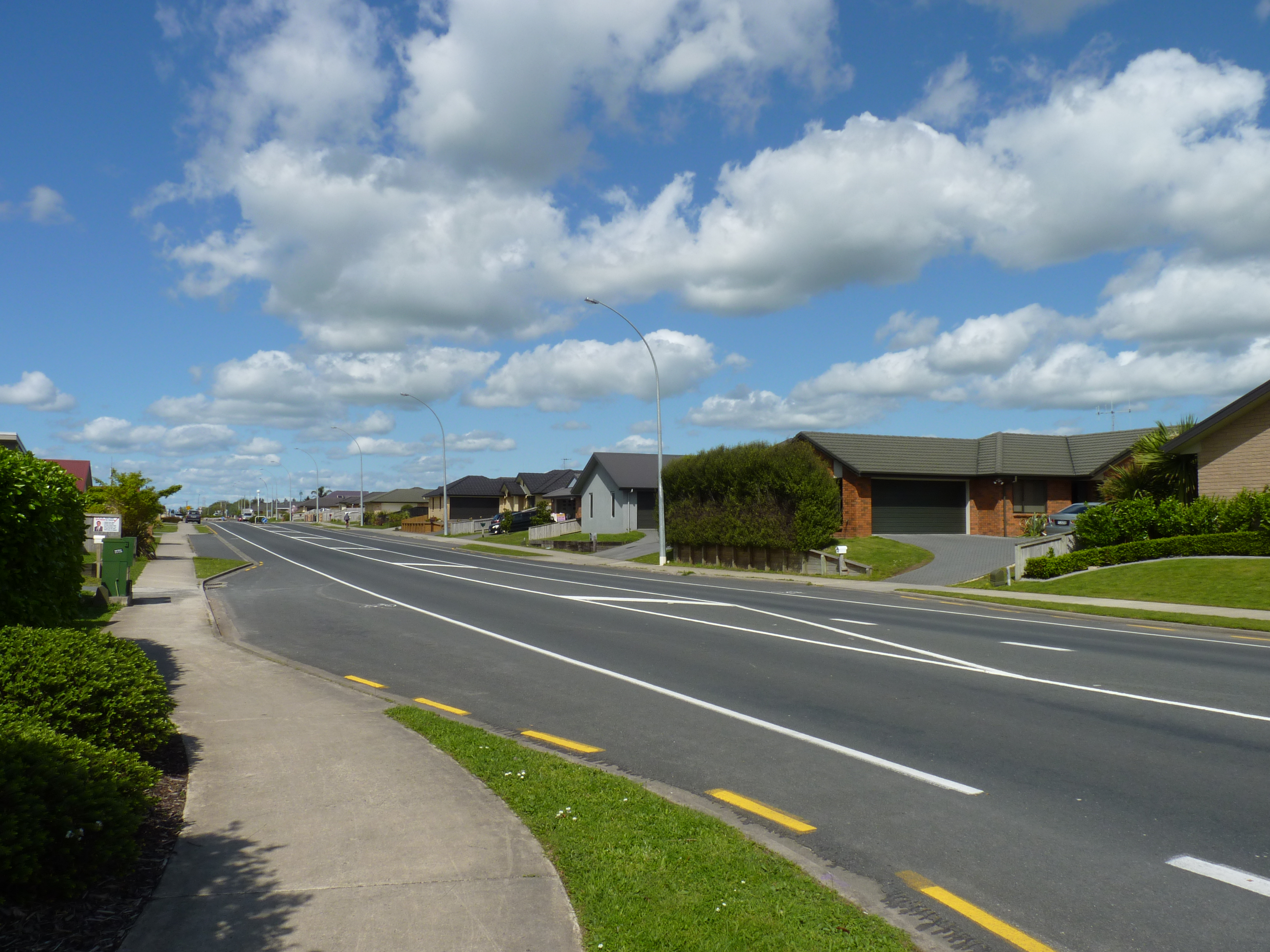
- Thomas Road, Rototuna
- Interactive map of Rototuna
- Coordinates: 37°43′49.82″S 175°16′0.87″E
- Country: New Zealand
- City: Hamilton
- Local authority: Hamilton City Council
- Electoral ward: East Ward

Area
  - Land: 600 ha (1,500 acres)

Population (June 2025)
  - Total: 13,780
  - Density: 2,300/km^{2} (5,900/sq mi)
- Postcode: 3210

Magellan Rise	Horsham Downs	Gordonton
Flagstaff	Rototuna	St James Park
Harrowfield	Chartwell	Huntington

Rototuna is a suburb in northern Hamilton, New Zealand, east of Flagstaff. It is one of the newest and fastest-growing suburbs in Hamilton, along with neighbouring Huntington and Flagstaff.

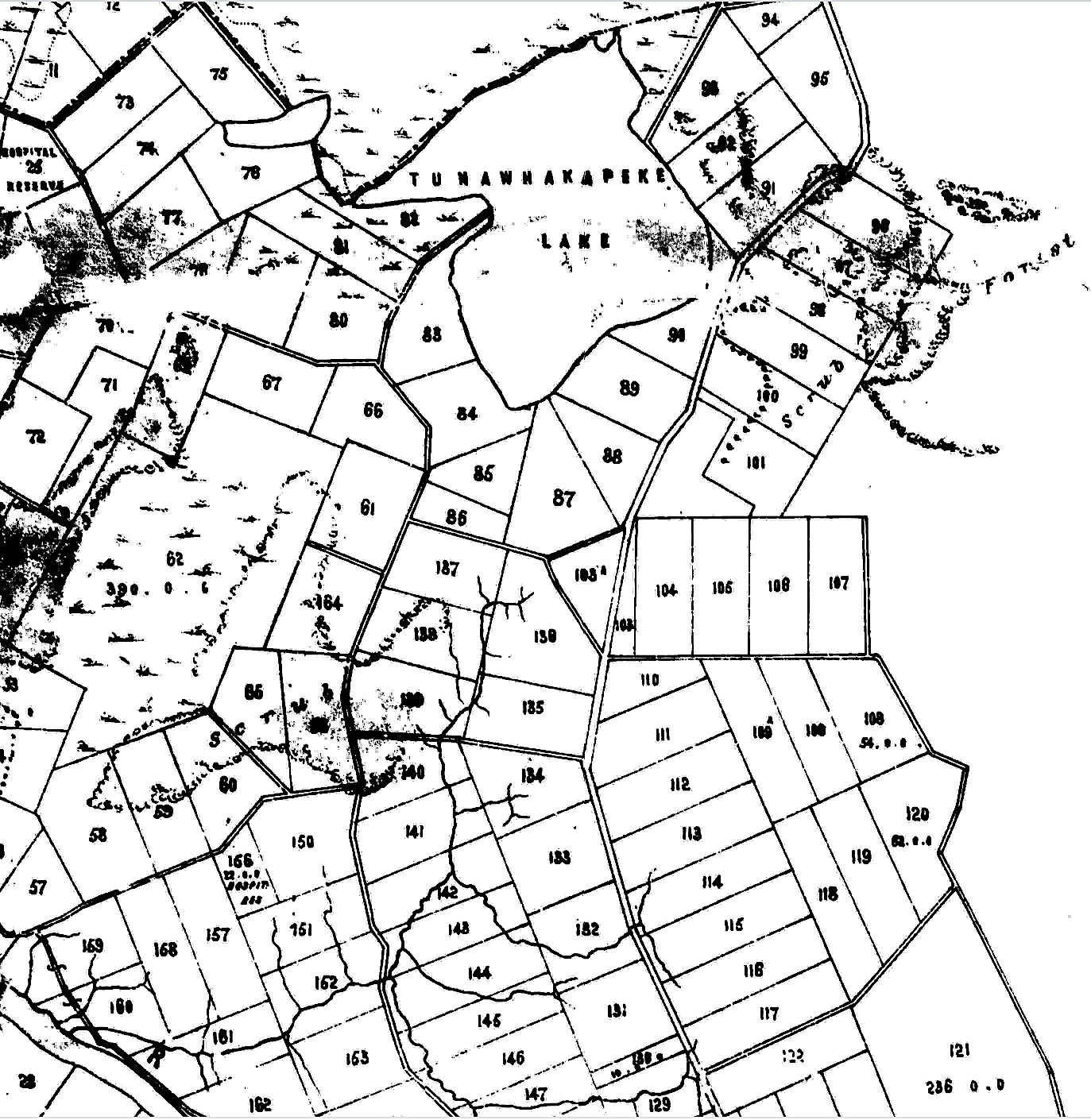
1865 Plan of the Military settlements in the Upper Waikato District showing Lake Tunawhakapeka. Rototuna is to the south

Sometimes the name Rototuna is used to collectively refer to all of the city north of Wairere Drive and east of the Waikato River, including Flagstaff, St Petersburg, Magellan Rise, Ashmore, Somerset Heights, St James, Callum Brae and Huntington.

Although many Hamilton City publications say it was built on what was previously the bed of an ancient lake of which Rototuna was a tiny remnant, Lake Tunawhakapeka was to the north in Horsham Downs. However, its alternative name of Lake Rototuna, was the inspiration for the name given to a new post office in 1907 and later adopted for the area. The New Zealand Ministry for Culture and Heritage gives a translation of "eel lake" for Rototuna.

== History ==
Carbon dating of 1550 to 1625 was put on charcoal from a cultivation ground, which was uncovered on the corner of Hukanui Road and Wairere Drive in 1999.

Until around 1915 Rototuna Lake was described as "an ornament", but by 1919 it had been largely drained. It lay to the north of Rototuna, in Horsham Downs. Further drainage was done in 1926 and the lake bed was given to surrounding farms in 1928. It remained as Lake E, more recently given its original name of Lake Tunawhakapeka, where the peat deposits date back over 17,000 years. Like most of Waikato it would have been inundated by a flood of water and ignimbrite debris from Lake Taupo about 22,000 years ago. The remaining lake is a metre deep and covers 6.7 ha (17 acres). Lake Tunawhakapeka is said to have been 600 acres (240 ha).

Like most of western Waikato the land at Rototuna was confiscated following the 1863 invasion of the Waikato. It was surveyed into 50-acre parcels as grants to militiamen of the Fourth Waikato Regiment. By 1880 enough farmers had settled to be worth forming a school committee for the 30 children, which opened as Kirikiriroa School in 1881. The school was renamed Rototuna in 1907 and enlarged in 1914. More development came in the 1900s, with a post office and a church in 1907, a store in 1910, a casein factory in 1913 and a grocery and butcher in 1914. Rototuna Road was gravelled in 1909, but it was still muddy enough to cause a death in 1916 and complaints were still being made in 1920. Electricity came to the area about 1922. The post office was replaced by rural delivery before 1926. Another church opened in 1931 and a hall was open at about the same time. The school closed between 1944 and 1963. Its site is now occupied by a church. The old dairy factory was used as a chocolate factory until 2017.

== Geography ==
Rototuna is mainly in the Kirikiriroa Stream valley. It ranges from 35 m (115 ft) to 62 m (203 ft) above sea level.

== Demographics ==
Rototuna covers 6.00 km^{2} (2.32 sq mi) and had an estimated population of 13,780 as of June 2025, with a population density of 2,297 people per km^{2}.

Historical population
Year	Pop.	±% p.a.
2006	6,480	—
2013	9,018	+4.83%
2018	10,029	+2.15%
2023	12,213	+4.02%

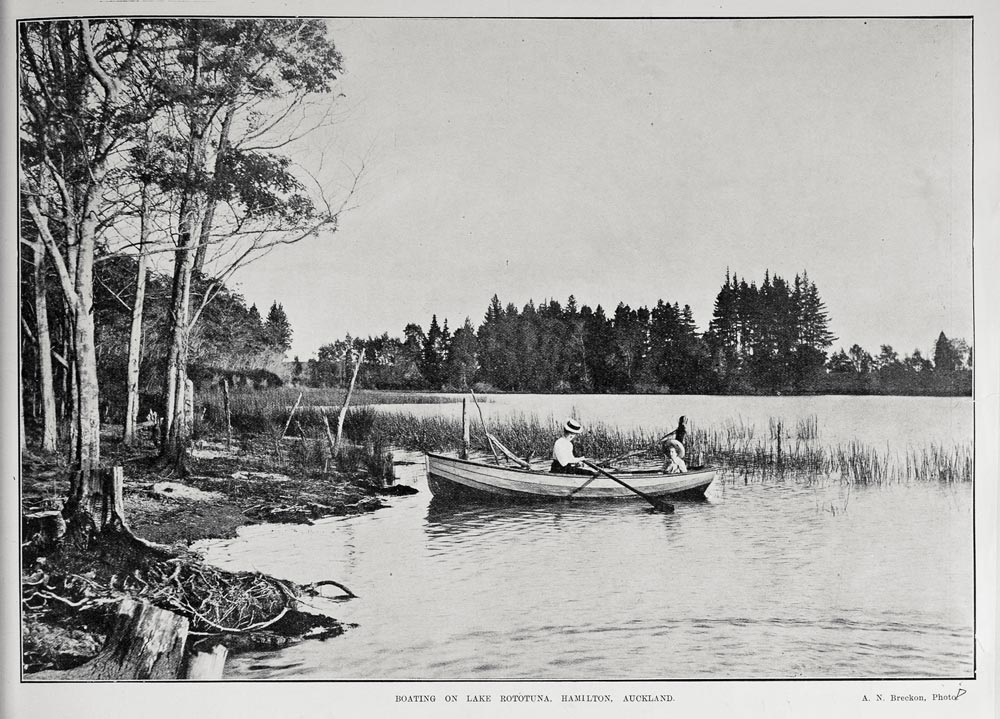
Rototuna Lake in 1908

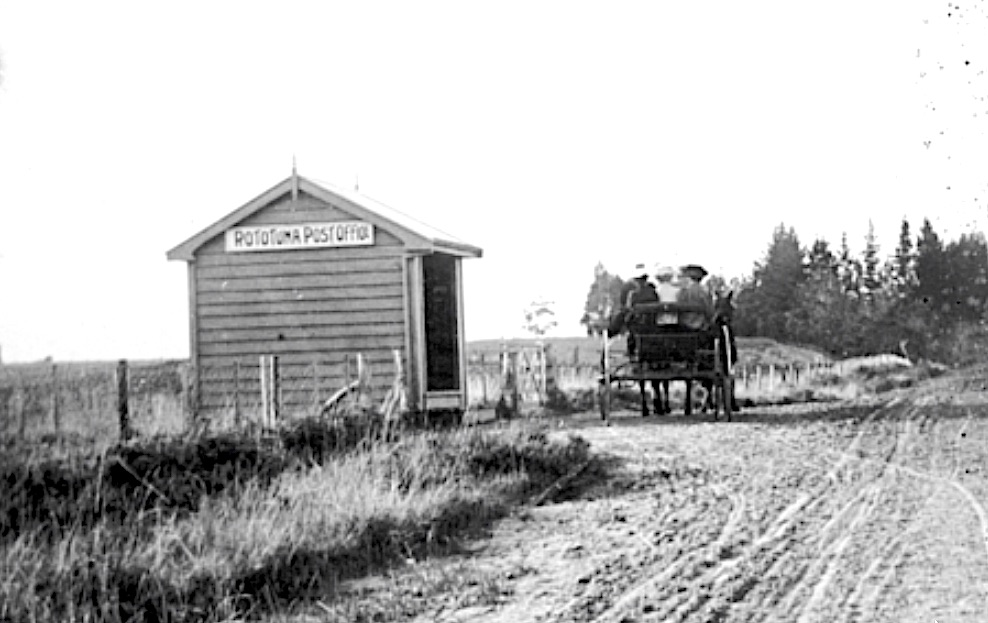
Rototuna Post Office about 1907

Rototuna had a population of 12,213 in the 2023 New Zealand census, an increase of 2,184 people (21.8%) since the 2018 census, and an increase of 3,195 people (35.4%) since the 2013 census. There were 5,928 males, 6,255 females and 33 people of other genders in 3,927 dwellings. 2.6% of people identified as LGBTIQ+. The median age was 36.6 years (compared with 38.1 years nationally). There were 2,781 people (22.8%) aged under 15 years, 2,259 (18.5%) aged 15 to 29, 5,463 (44.7%) aged 30 to 64, and 1,713 (14.0%) aged 65 or older.

People could identify as more than one ethnicity. The results were 59.7% European (Pākehā); 11.8% Māori; 3.1% Pasifika; 31.6% Asian; 3.4% Middle Eastern, Latin American and African New Zealanders (MELAA); and 2.7% other, which includes people giving their ethnicity as "New Zealander". English was spoken by 92.7%, Māori language by 2.6%, Samoan by 0.4%, and other languages by 30.8%. No language could be spoken by 2.4% (e.g. too young to talk). New Zealand Sign Language was known by 0.6%. The percentage of people born overseas was 40.3, compared with 28.8% nationally.

Religious affiliations were 34.5% Christian, 5.3% Hindu, 3.0% Islam, 0.5% Māori religious beliefs, 1.6% Buddhist, 0.3% New Age, 0.1% Jewish, and 4.4% other religions. People who answered that they had no religion were 44.5%, and 5.9% of people did not answer the census question.

Of those at least 15 years old, 2,901 (30.8%) people had a bachelor's or higher degree, 4,263 (45.2%) had a post-high school certificate or diploma, and 2,268 (24.0%) people exclusively held high school qualifications. The median income was $45,600, compared with $41,500 nationally. 1,341 people (14.2%) earned over $100,000 compared to 12.1% nationally. The employment status of those at least 15 was that 5,004 (53.1%) people were employed full-time, 1,239 (13.1%) were part-time, and 231 (2.4%) were unemployed.

Individual statistical areas
Name	Area (km^{2})	Population	Density (per km^{2})	Dwellings	Median age	Median income
Rototuna North	2.44	2,310	947	765	35.4 years	$39,300
Rototuna West	0.84	2,778	3,307	831	36.3 years	$49,900
Rototuna East	0.75	2,682	3,576	819	32.9 years	$49,100
Rototuna South West	1.09	2,193	2,012	741	41.4 years	$44,000
Rototuna South East	0.88	2,247	2,553	768	40.0 years	$45,100
New Zealand					38.1 years	$41,500

Rototuna's population has risen rapidly, from 453 in 1996 to 12,213 in 2023. Its median income remains above the national median, but the median age in the northern areas is below the national median age of 38.1 years in 2023.

For censuses prior to 2018 Rototuna was formed of census areas for Rototuna (in 2018 largely renamed Rototuna South) and Horsham Downs (in 2018 forming Rototuna North and Central). Growth was initially to the south, then the north.

== Facilities and Attractions ==
Rototuna has three shopping centres including Rototuna Shopping Centre and St James Shopping Centre. The recently completed mixed-use development called Rototuna Village is a mixture of retail, hospitality, office and high end apartments.

Future plans for a Rototuna "town-centre" is included in council planning. This is to be located at the corner of Resolution Drive & Borman Road. It is likely to include community facilities such as a library and possibly a pool - although both of these may be shared with the High Schools. $24m was proposed for library, pool and sports fields in the 2018 plan. Completion is planned by 2022.

=== Parks ===
Four large parks are being developed. Mangaiti Park, Te Manatu Park, Hare Puke Park and Rototuna Sports Parks. Construction started at the Sports Park in 2018. It was renamed Korokori Park in 2019 and officially opened in 2020. It will have 5 pitches by 2021. Hare Puke Park playground opened in 2018, with a theme of eels and the hinaki used to catch them. Plans for Mangaiti Park Te Manatu Park were developed in 2015 and a playground opened at Mangaiti in 2019. There are also smaller parks at Eden Park Reserve, Moonlight Drive Reserve, Rototuna Park, Te Awa O Katapaki Esplanade, Te Toe Toe Reserve and Wiltshire Drive Reserve.

== Infrastructure ==
=== Roads ===
Rototuna roads have been enlarged from the previous country lane network since 2001, when the southern part of Resolution Drive was gazetted. Extension to Borman Road cost $1.4m in 2004. To be completed in 2021, Resolution Drive extension will link Rototuna to the Waikato Expressway to the north and the ring road at Wairere Drive to the south. The 1.9 km (1.2 mi) extension will cost $9.8m and a benefit–cost ratio of 4.1% is expected. East–west links are being provided by extension of Borman Rd (in 2006 it cost $840,000 to extend it to Cate Road) and North City Rd at a further cost of about $21m. All have two lanes and roundabouts.

The main traffic flows are on the north–south roads; Gordonton, Horsham Downs and Resolution, with lesser flows east–west on Thomas Road.

==== Buses ====
Buses on the Orbiter route serve Rototuna at 15 minute intervals. The Orbiter route was lengthened to serve Rototuna in 2009. The Rototuna Circular bus has provided a half hourly service since 2018. Bus 16 has linked Rototuna to the Transport Centre on a circuitous route via Callum Brae, at half hourly intervals, since 2018. Prior to 2009 that route was largely served by a Northerner bus from Chartwell. School routes to St Paul's, Southwell, Peachgrove Intermediate, Hamilton Boys' High and Sacred Heart were added in 2016.

==== Cycleways ====
3 m (9.8 ft) wide shared paths are being built beside Resolution Drive and Borman Rd and $1m is being spent on cycleways, mostly running north–south on the eastern edge of Rototuna.

=== Water ===
A 24 million litre reservoir opened at Kay Rd, beside the Expressway, in 2017. It is connected to the city's mains pipe network.

== Education ==
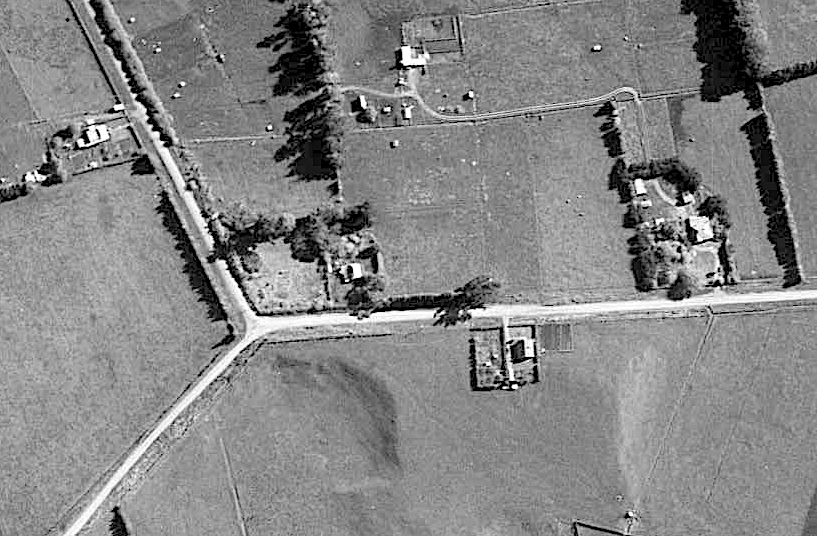
Rototuna School aerial photo 1952 at corner of Cate and Rototuna School Roads

Rototuna Primary School and Te Totara Primary School are contributing primary schools (years 1–6) with rolls of 821 and 716 students respectively. Rototuna Primary opened in 2003 and Te Totara opened in 2008.

Rototuna Junior High School opened in early 2016 for the start of the school year which serves Years 7 to 10. It cost $40m to build the school for 1,200 pupils. Rototuna Senior High School opened in early 2017 for the start of the school year which serves Years 11 to 13. The Junior & Senior high schools are based on the same grounds and share some facilities. The junior school has a roll of 1,372 and the senior school has 1,031 students.

Hamilton Christian School is a state-integrated non-denominational composite school for years 1 to 13 with a roll of 979.

All these schools are coeducational. Rolls are as of July 2026.

There are also many early childhood centres throughout the suburb.

== See also ==
- List of streets in Hamilton
- Suburbs of Hamilton, New Zealand
