= Pukete =

Suburb of Hamilton, New Zealand

- Suburb
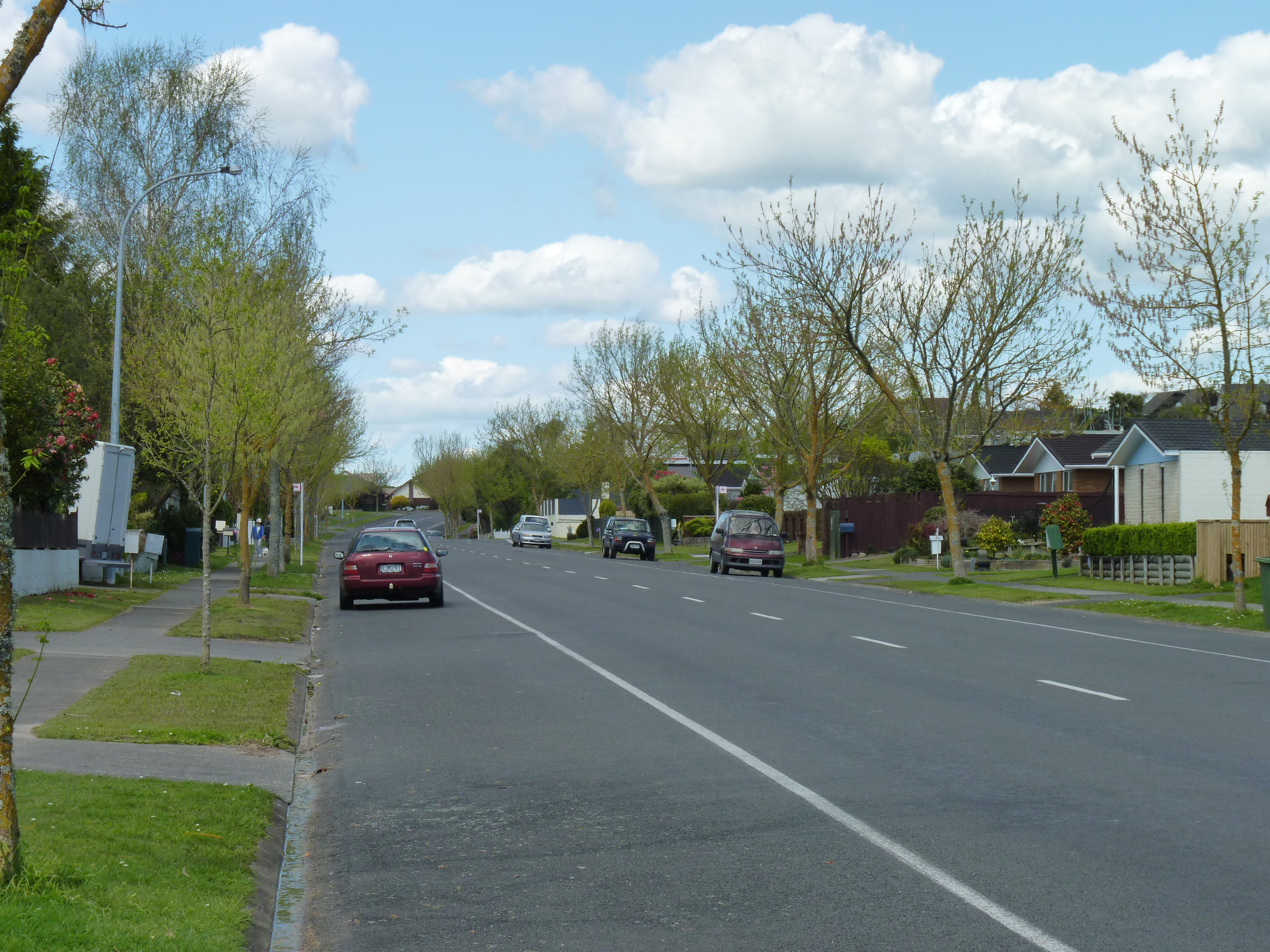
- Pukete, Hamilton
- Interactive map of Pukete
- Coordinates: 37°44′37.65″S 175°14′22.92″E
- Country: New Zealand
- City: Hamilton, New Zealand
- Local authority: Hamilton City Council
- Electoral ward: West Ward
- Established: 1969

Area
  - Land: 193 ha (480 acres)

Population (June 2025)
  - Total: 4,960
  - Density: 2,570/km^{2} (6,660/sq mi)

Te Kowhai	Horotiu	Flagstaff
Burbush	Pukete	Harrowfield
Te Rapa	St Andrews	Queenwood

Pukete is a 1970s riverside suburb in northwestern Hamilton in New Zealand.

The cobblestoned walk in the park has a grass dog exercise area. The riverside walkway, which includes many pedestrian bridges, can be used by walkers or cyclists, but the lower sections are subject to flooding in winter. A pedestrian bridge links Braithwaite Park to Flagstaff on the eastern side of the Waikato River. A 2015 River Plan proposed it become 'a flower garden bridge'.

There is a small beach on the west side of the river at Braithwaite Park often used in summer by water skiers and picnickers. To the north of the residential area is the Pukete Mountain Bike track, an equestrian centre, and a two-lane launching ramp into the Waikato River, all on the Pukete Farm Park. A concreted riverside track, for bikes and pedestrians, runs north from Mountain View Lane, starting by the southeast side of the Fonterra Te Rapa Milk powder factory.

The eastern part of Pukete and neighbouring St Andrews is built on an old river terrace. This rises to the flat alluvial fan that covers most of Hamilton. The land rises to one of Hamilton's many small hills at Ngaio Place giving views over most of Hamilton.

Four-laning of the Pukete Bridge was completed in Easter 2013, well ahead of schedule due to the long dry summer.

== Demographics ==
Pukete covers 1.93 km^{2} (0.75 sq mi) and had an estimated population of 4,960 as of June 2025, with a population density of 2,570 people per km^{2}.

Historical population
Year	Pop.	±% p.a.
2006	4,497	—
2013	4,296	−0.65%
2018	4,605	+1.40%
2023	4,716	+0.48%

Pukete had a population of 4,716 in the 2023 New Zealand census, an increase of 111 people (2.4%) since the 2018 census, and an increase of 420 people (9.8%) since the 2013 census. There were 2,295 males, 2,409 females and 12 people of other genders in 1,581 dwellings. 3.1% of people identified as LGBTIQ+. The median age was 34.9 years (compared with 38.1 years nationally). There were 1,065 people (22.6%) aged under 15 years, 918 (19.5%) aged 15 to 29, 2,184 (46.3%) aged 30 to 64, and 552 (11.7%) aged 65 or older.

People could identify as more than one ethnicity. The results were 73.4% European (Pākehā); 23.1% Māori; 5.5% Pasifika; 13.9% Asian; 1.6% Middle Eastern, Latin American and African New Zealanders (MELAA); and 2.6% other, which includes people giving their ethnicity as "New Zealander". English was spoken by 95.5%, Māori language by 4.5%, Samoan by 0.7%, and other languages by 13.4%. No language could be spoken by 2.5% (e.g. too young to talk). New Zealand Sign Language was known by 0.4%. The percentage of people born overseas was 23.0, compared with 28.8% nationally.

Religious affiliations were 29.8% Christian, 2.7% Hindu, 0.9% Islam, 1.1% Māori religious beliefs, 0.7% Buddhist, 0.2% New Age, 0.1% Jewish, and 2.5% other religions. People who answered that they had no religion were 54.6%, and 7.4% of people did not answer the census question.

Of those at least 15 years old, 852 (23.3%) people had a bachelor's or higher degree, 1,983 (54.3%) had a post-high school certificate or diploma, and 810 (22.2%) people exclusively held high school qualifications. The median income was $48,000, compared with $41,500 nationally. 390 people (10.7%) earned over $100,000 compared to 12.1% nationally. The employment status of those at least 15 was that 2,079 (56.9%) people were employed full-time, 453 (12.4%) were part-time, and 102 (2.8%) were unemployed.

=== Individual census areas ===
Pukete includes two census areas, East and West. The population is stable, and is wealthier and younger than the national average, as shown below.

	East				West				National median income
Year	Population	Average age	Households	Median income	Population	Average age	Households	Median income	National median income
1996	2,409		777		1,980		618		
2001	2,409	33.2	801	$25,500	2,085	30.2	675	$24,100	$18,500
2006	2,397	33.3	810	$31,800	2,103	29.8	675	$29,900	$24,100
2013	2,280	35.8	816	$38,100	2,016	32.7	675	$32,900	$27,900
2018	2,361	35.0	825	$40,600	2,244	32.2	717	$36,900	$31,800
2023	2,433	36.0	849	$49,500	2,283	33.9	729	$46.700	$41,500

In 2023 the main ethnic groups were:

Area	European	Māori	Asian
East	77.7%	20.2%	12.1%
West	68.9%	26.1%	15.9%

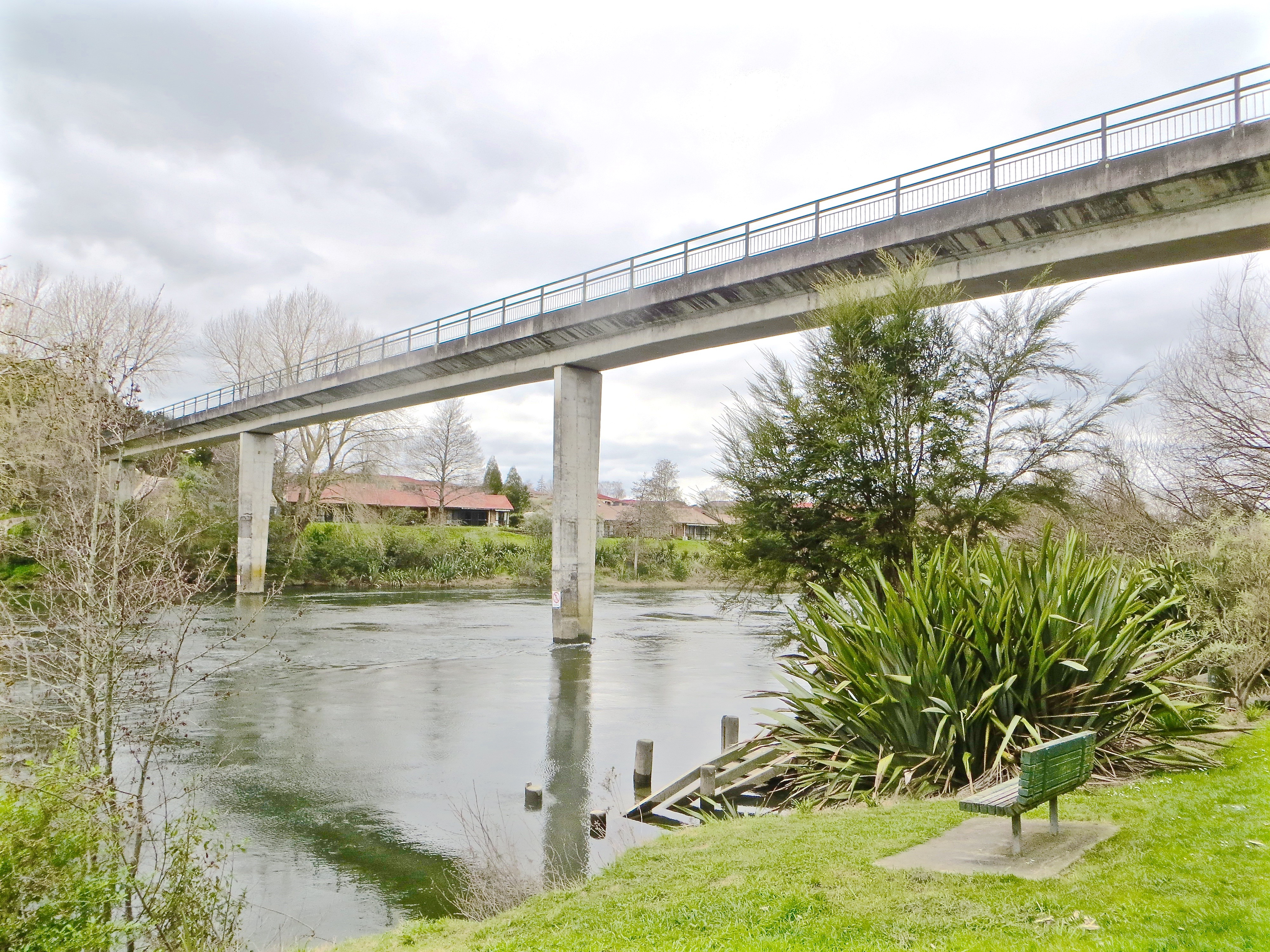
Pedestrian bridge over the Waikato at Pukete, built to carry sewage from the east side of the city in 1975

== History ==
Pukete Pā is located in the north of the suburb on a cliff on the Waikato River bank, at the northern end of the riverside Braithwate Park. It is thought to have been built by Nga Iwi and later conquered by Ngati Koura. The name Pukete comes from a locally made bag used to soak hinau berries in streams to ferment and preserve them. The area was confiscated in 1864, after the invasion of the Waikato. A double ditch remains to the north of the Pa. Carved wooden items, found close to the pā, are in Waikato Museum. Habitation was sparse, as one early European traveller noted no other settlement for 15 mi (24 km) along the Waikato.

Pukete parish existed from at least 1867, but, until the 1900s, Horotiu was often referred to as Pukete. The Horotiu railway station changed its name from Pukete on 23 June 1907, when the proposed post office was referred to as Horotiu (Pukete), and the name of Horotiu school changed from Pukete in 1911.

Pukete and neighbouring Te Rapa were important sites for the kauri gum trade of the late 19th/early 20th centuries, being some of the southern-most locations where gum could be found.

In 2011, Hamilton Libraries compiled a list of street names, showing that most development in Pukete occurred over about a decade from 1969, that many roads were named after trees and several developers were involved. Before long, Pukete School was opened in 1972, and a swimming pool in 1975. Rather slower to open were a library in 1999, and Te Manawa Hall in 2002.

Street name	Date	Named by	Source of name
Church Road	1945-50	Waipa County Council	after a Waipa County councillor of 1945
Ashurst Avenue	1969	Taupo Totara Timber Company	tree theme
Sherwood Drive	1969	Taupo Totara Timber Company	tree theme
Totara Drive	1969	Taupo Totara Timber Company	tree theme
Challinor Street	1969	Builders Land Services	after R.C. Clough, chairman of the board
Clematis Avenue	1969	Builders Land Services	tree theme
Pukete Road	1969	Builders Land Services	parish name
Fuchsia Avenue	1971	Builders Land Services	tree theme
Houhere Place	1971	Builders Land Services	tree theme
Kohekohe Place	1971	Builders Land Services	tree theme
Pohutukawa Drive	1971	Builders Land Services	tree theme
Tanekaha Place	1971	Builders Land Services	tree theme
Titoki Place	1973	Builders Land Services	tree theme
Elmwood Crescent	1973	Taupo Totara Timber Company	tree theme
Oakfield Crescent	1973	Taupo Totara Timber Company	tree theme
Cullimore Street	1974	Peerless Homes Ltd	after Bert Cullimore, Housing Corporation
Frost Place	1974	Peerless Homes Ltd	land owner
Highland Drive	1974	Peerless Homes Ltd	
Manuka Street	1974	Builders Land Services	tree theme
Nikau Place	1975	Builders Land Services	tree theme
Norfolk Place	1975	Peerless Homes Ltd	tree theme
Ash Place	1976	Peerless Homes Ltd	tree theme
Cypress Crescent	1976	Peerless Homes Ltd	tree theme
Matipo Crescent	1976	Brian Perry Developments	tree theme
Ngaio Place	1977	Builders Land Services	tree theme
Cherrywood Street	1977	Taupo Totara Timber Company	tree theme
Chestnut Place	1977	Taupo Totara Timber Company	tree theme
Sycamore Place	1977	Taupo Totara Timber Company	tree theme
Willowfield Place	1977	Taupo Totara Timber Company	tree theme
O'Connell Court	1977	Housing Corporation	land owner
Horoeka Court	1978	Paramount Builders Ltd	tree theme
Kupe Place	1999	Grasshopper Developments	Taranaki gas field
Maui Street	1999	Grasshopper Developments	Taranaki gas field
McKee Street	1999	Grasshopper Developments	Taranaki gas field
Karewa Place	2002	Wairere Drive Properties Ltd	Karewa Island, Bay of Plenty

=== Braithwaite Park ===
Braithwaite Park was owned by Waikato Hospital Board, who sold it to developers in 1990, and the park was transferred to Hamilton City Council on 12 June 1990. It has a jetty, which is the terminus of a ferry to Hamilton.

== Education ==
Pukete School is a co-educational state primary school for Year 1 to 6 students with a roll of 416 as of July 2026. The first Pukete School was established in 1879, and burned down in 1909. The current school opened in 1973.

Te Rapa School also serves the area.

== See also ==
- List of streets in Hamilton
- Suburbs of Hamilton, New Zealand
- The Base (shopping centre)
- Pukete sewage works
- Te Rapa railway station
