= Callum Brae =

Coordinates: 37°44′20″S 175°16′18.02″E

- Suburb
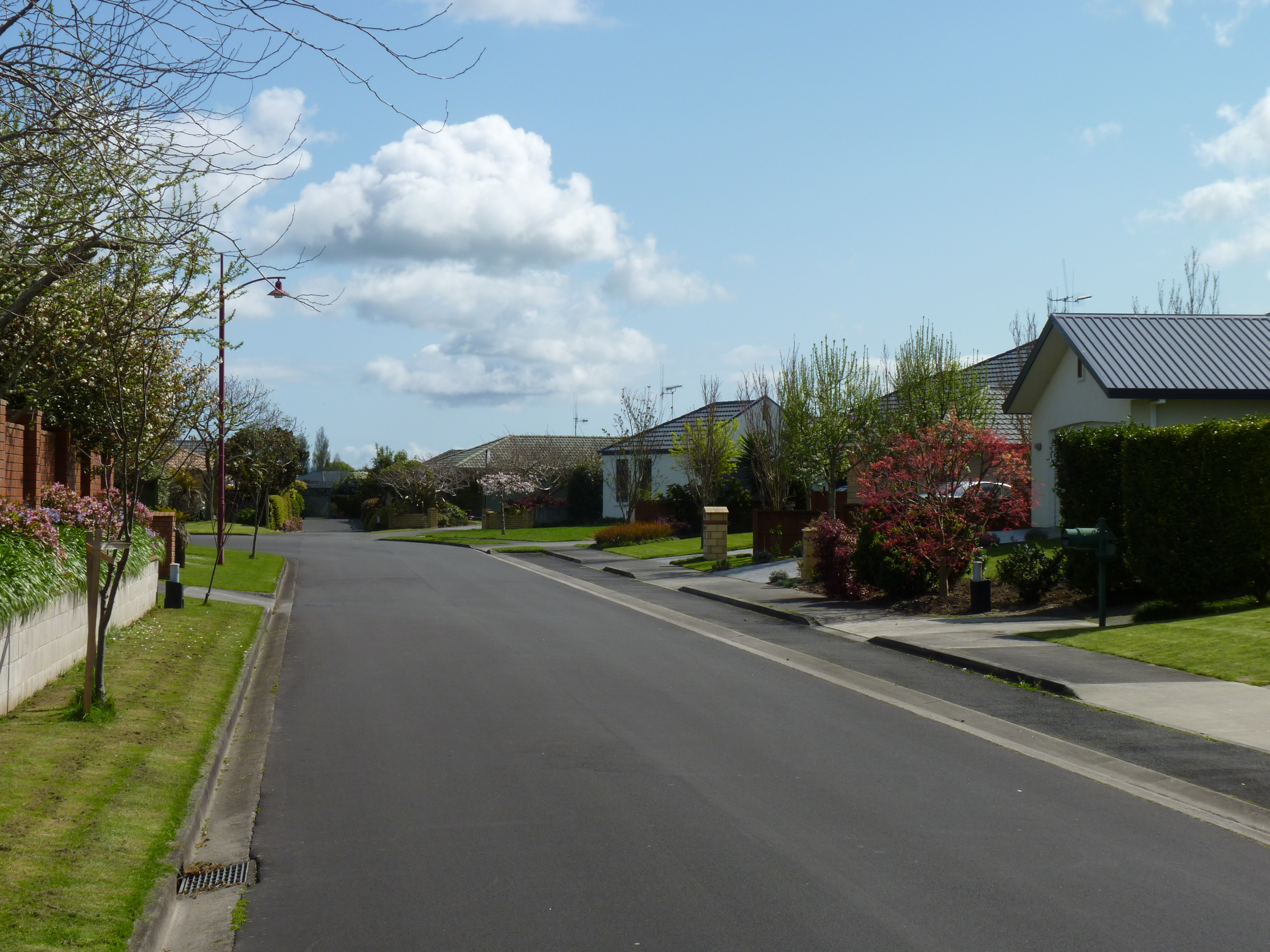
- A neighbourhood in Callum Brae, Hamilton.
- Interactive map of Callum Brae
- Country: New Zealand
- City: Hamilton, New Zealand
- Electoral ward: Hamilton East
- Established: 2000

Callum Brae is a suburb in north-eastern Hamilton in New Zealand.

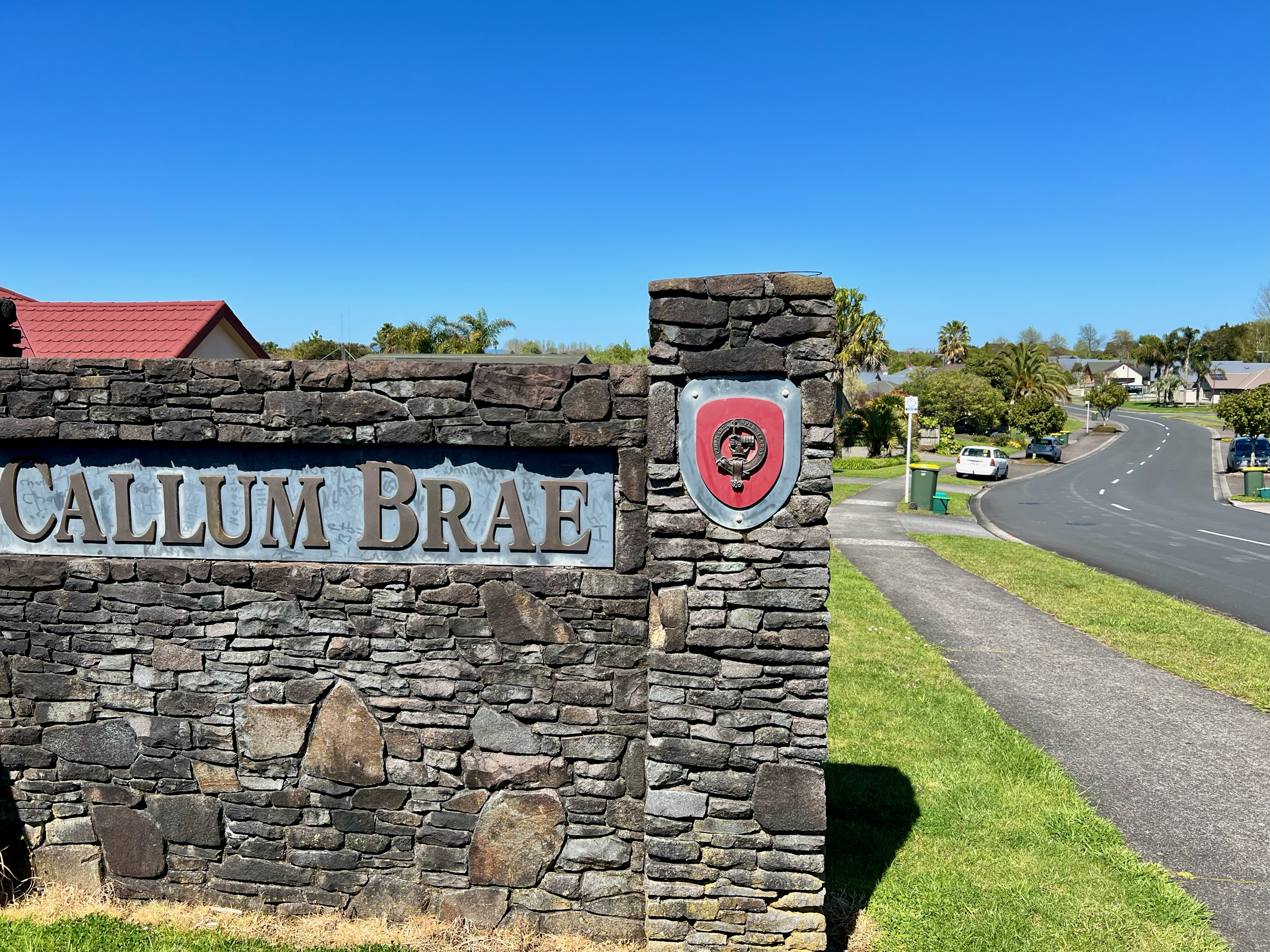
Callum Brae entrance on the corner of Rototuna and Callum Brae Roads, with Clan Donald crest.

It is part of the Rototuna South census area. Hamilton City Council includes Callum Brae as part of Rototuna, often understood to include other neighbouring suburbs: Grosvenor, Somerset Heights, Huntington and St James. In 2012 Hamilton Libraries said Callum Court is in the suburb of Rototuna. It was named in 2000 by developer Bramley Ltd., following a theme of naming all streets in the Callum Brae development with Scottish names.

Tauhara Park lies to the west of Callum Brae. Work was done in 2002 to prevent methane from the old Rototuna landfill migrating to Callum Brae and monitoring continues. The leachate is also collected.

Bus 16 has served Callum Brae at half hourly intervals since 2018.

== See also ==
- Suburbs of Hamilton, New Zealand
