= Magellan Rise, New Zealand =

Magellan Rise
- Suburb
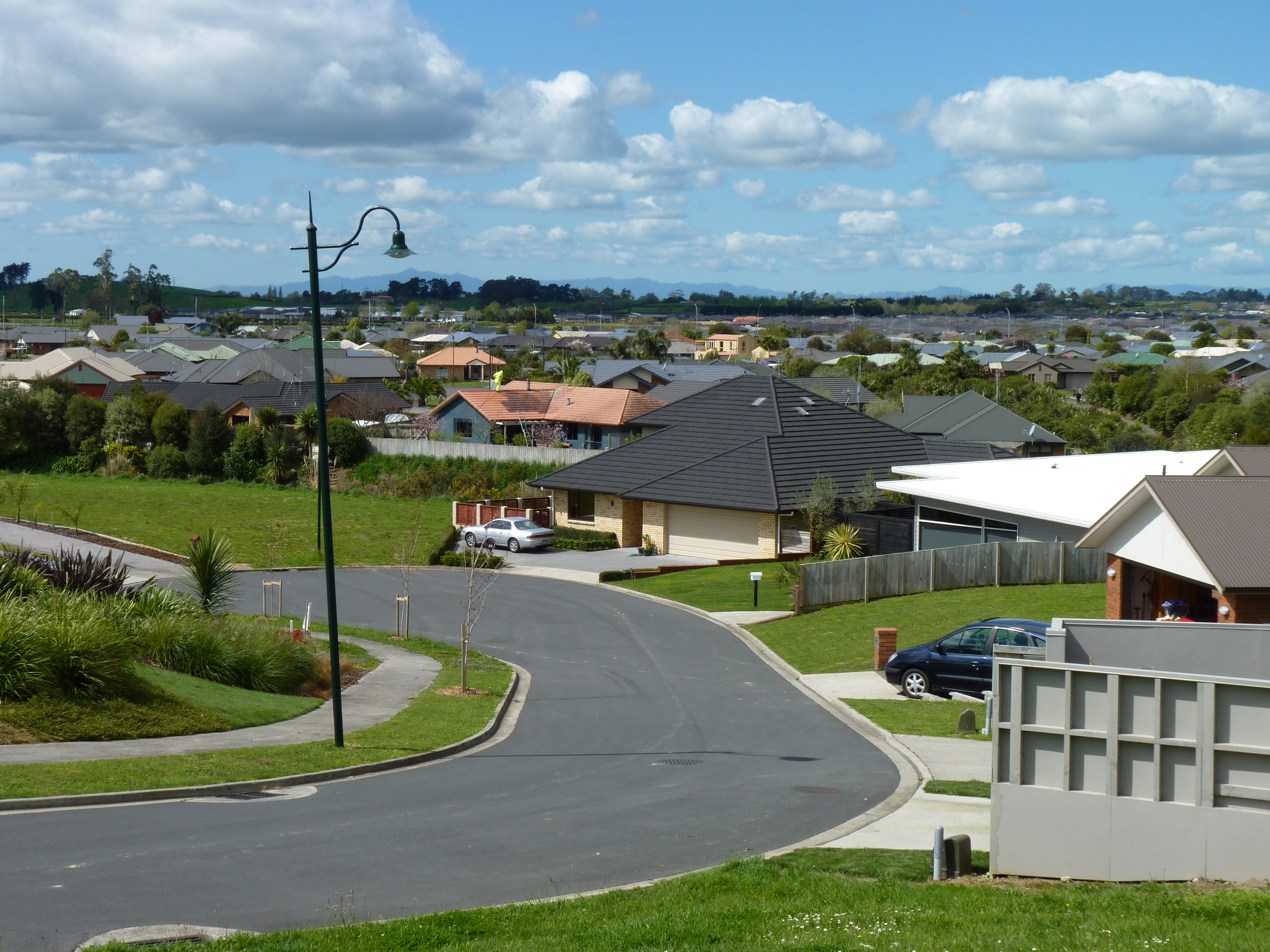
- A neighbourhood in Magellan Rise, Hamilton.
- Interactive map of Magellan Rise
- Coordinates: 37°43′35.28″S 175°14′49.03″E
- Country: New Zealand
- City: Hamilton, New Zealand
- Electoral ward: Hamilton East
- Established: 1990s

	Horsham Downs
St Petersburg	Magellan Rise	Gordonton
	Flagstaff

Magellan Rise is a new suburb in north-eastern Hamilton in New Zealand. In the 2018 census it is at the boundaries of Flagstaff North, East and South areas and is described by others as Flagstaff.

The area was rezoned for development in 2005 and there were houses to the east of Te Awa O Katapaki Stream by 2009. It was still being marketed in 2020 by the developer, CDL Land New Zealand Limited, who also developed the adjacent Ashmore subdivision.

Lake Magellan was created by damming Te Awa O Katapaki Stream to provide stormwater treatment. It was upgraded in 2019, following a 2013 modelling of flooding in the area.

A culvert rebuild in 2013 made the stream more accessible for eels and other fish. Parts of the stream valley, including Te Awa o Katapaki Reserve, provide a cycle track.

Buses on the Orbiter route serve Discovery Drive at 15 minute intervals.

== See also ==
- Suburbs of Hamilton, New Zealand
