= Flagstaff, Hamilton =

Suburb of Hamilton, New Zealand

Flagstaff
- Suburb
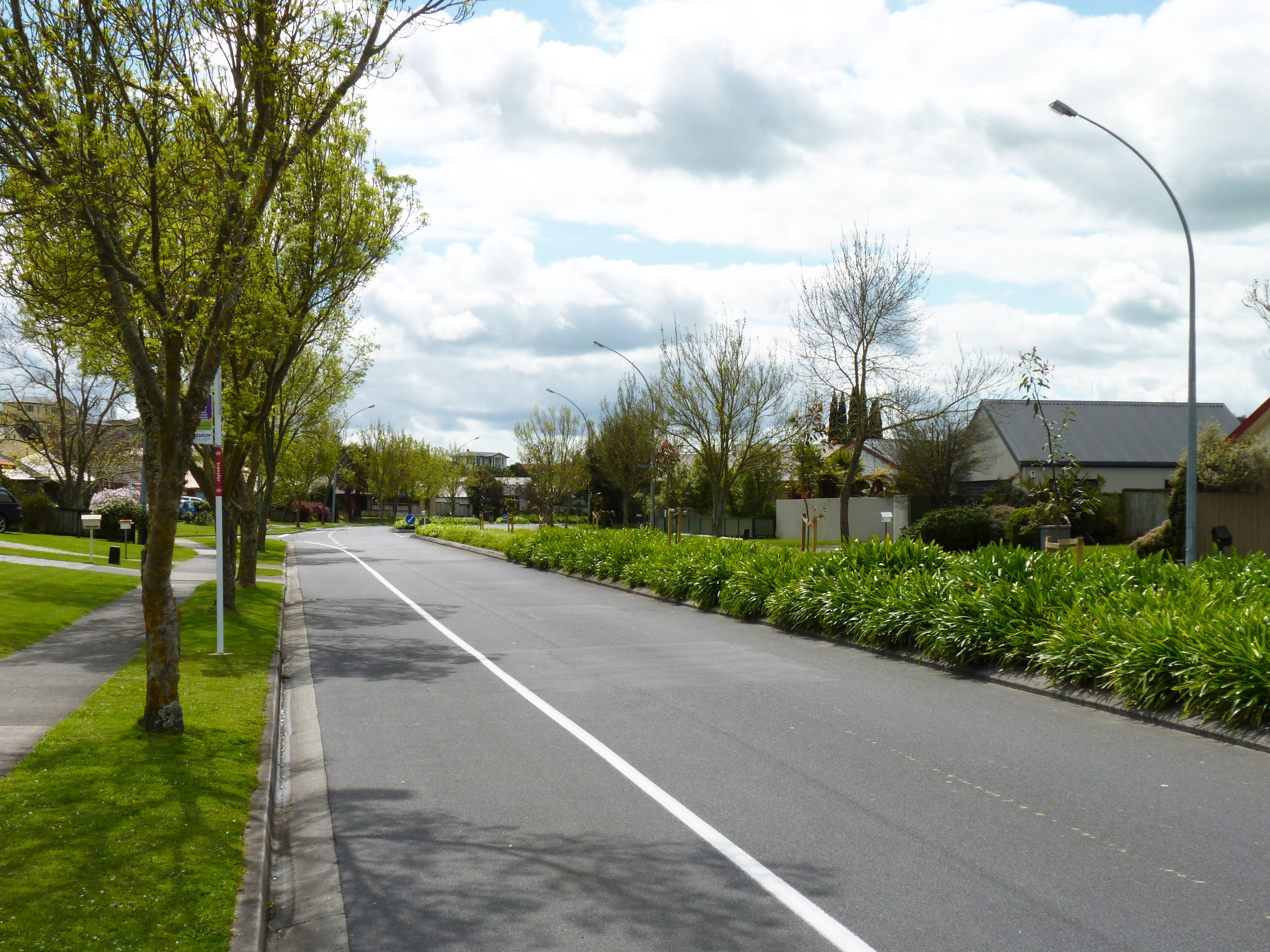
- Discovery Drive in Flagstaff, Hamilton
- Interactive map of Flagstaff
- Coordinates: 37°44′19.26″S 175°15′13.44″E
- Country: New Zealand
- City: Hamilton, New Zealand
- Local authority: Hamilton City Council
- Electoral ward: East Ward
- Established: 1986

Area
  - Land: 521 ha (1,290 acres)

Population (June 2025)
  - Total: 14,130
  - Density: 2,710/km^{2} (7,020/sq mi)

	Magellan Rise	Gordonton
Pukete	Flagstaff	Rototuna
Te Rapa	Harrowfield	Chartwell

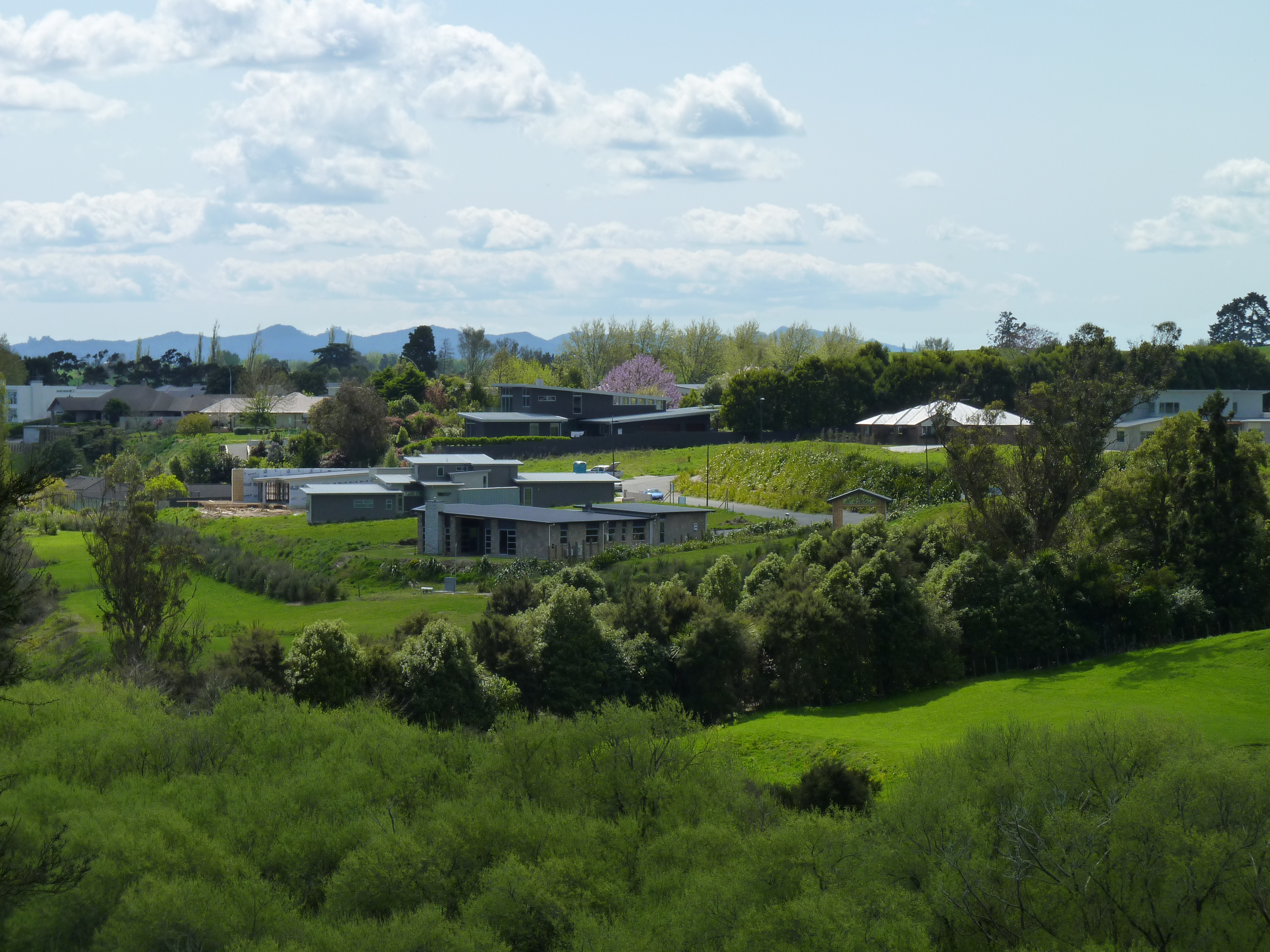
Development in 'St Petersburg', Hamilton

Flagstaff is a suburb in north-east Hamilton, New Zealand. It was originally called Dulverton on council plans, but it was officially named Flagstaff in 1986 when it was declared as a suburb. The area was heavily developed in the 1990s.

Sometimes the name Rototuna is used to collectively refer to all of the city north of Wairere Drive and east of the Waikato River, including Flagstaff and its developments, including Magellan Rise.

The name "Flagstaff" comes from the flagstaff that was located on the hillock at the western end of Sylvester Road in the 1870s. A flag was raised by the local farmer when a steamer passed to alert the port authorities in the settlement 7 km further south.

Flagstaff is connected to Pukete by a 5 m wide pedestrian bridge that connects with a series of walkways on both banks of the Waikato River. The suburb is served by a shopping centre with parks for 50 cars. It has 18 shops and a gym.

Two playgrounds serve the new suburbs in northern Flagstaff at Hare Puke Park and Te Huia Reserve.

== History ==
The District Plan lists two middens in the Te Awa O Katapaki valley.

Like most of western Waikato the land at Flagstaff was confiscated following the 1863 invasion of the Waikato. It was surveyed into 50-acre parcels as grants to militiamen of the Fourth Waikato Regiment.

=== Roads ===
Until Hamilton's suburbs extended to Flagstaff in the 1990s, the only roads through the area were Rototuna School Rd, River Rd and Sylvester Rd. River Road was shown on an 1865 map of the military settlements and extended form Hamilton to Ngāruawāhia by 1879. A request to improve Flagstaff Hill Rd was made in 1909 and it was inspected in 1910. Rototuna School Road was also on the 1865 map and was gravelled in 1909. In 1908 J. and C. Sylvester asked Kirikiriroa Road Board for a road and by 1917 the Board were planning to improve the road.

== Geography ==
Southern Flagstaff is in the Te Awa O Katapaki stream valley, which has a 385 ha (950 acres) catchment. It has short-finned eels, mosquitofish and common smelt. In 2013 fish passage was improved by a new culvert under River Rd. Flows from the urban area are attenuated by Lake Magellan.

The north of Flagstaff is in the 3.2 km (2.0 mi) long southern branch of the Otama-ngenge stream valley. Giant kokopu live the stream. Glaisdale West lakes and wetland were built in 2015 to attenuate flows from the developed area and keep heavy metal run-off from vehicles out of Otama-ngenge stream.

== Demographics ==
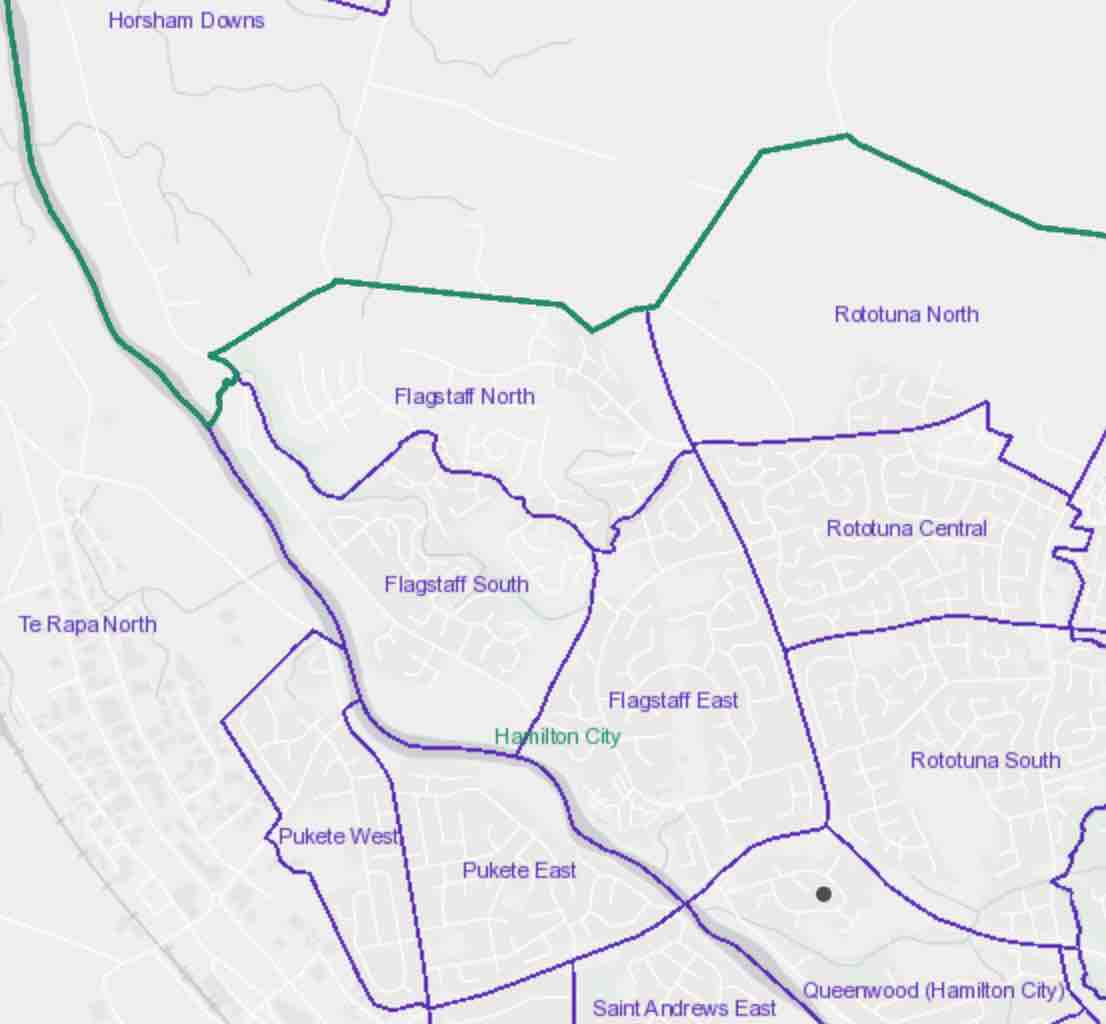
Flagstaff census areas 2018

Flagstaff covers 5.21 km^{2} (2.01 sq mi) and had an estimated population of 14,130 as of June 2025, with a population density of 2,712 people per km^{2}.

Historical population
Year	Pop.	±% p.a.
2006	3,945	—
2013	5,898	+5.91%
2018	9,828	+10.75%
2023	12,777	+5.39%

Flagstaff had a population of 12,777 in the 2023 New Zealand census, an increase of 2,949 people (30.0%) since the 2018 census, and an increase of 6,879 people (116.6%) since the 2013 census. There were 6,168 males, 6,576 females and 30 people of other genders in 4,113 dwellings. 2.4% of people identified as LGBTIQ+. The median age was 37.5 years (compared with 38.1 years nationally). There were 2,991 people (23.4%) aged under 15 years, 2,013 (15.8%) aged 15 to 29, 5,571 (43.6%) aged 30 to 64, and 2,199 (17.2%) aged 65 or older.

People could identify as more than one ethnicity. The results were 61.3% European (Pākehā); 11.1% Māori; 2.3% Pasifika; 32.8% Asian; 2.7% Middle Eastern, Latin American and African New Zealanders (MELAA); and 1.5% other, which includes people giving their ethnicity as "New Zealander". English was spoken by 93.5%, Māori language by 2.1%, Samoan by 0.3%, and other languages by 29.6%. No language could be spoken by 2.3% (e.g. too young to talk). New Zealand Sign Language was known by 0.4%. The percentage of people born overseas was 37.9, compared with 28.8% nationally.

Religious affiliations were 32.6% Christian, 5.2% Hindu, 2.3% Islam, 0.4% Māori religious beliefs, 1.6% Buddhist, 0.2% New Age, 0.1% Jewish, and 4.1% other religions. People who answered that they had no religion were 47.1%, and 6.5% of people did not answer the census question.

Of those at least 15 years old, 3,246 (33.2%) people had a bachelor's or higher degree, 4,353 (44.5%) had a post-high school certificate or diploma, and 2,187 (22.3%) people exclusively held high school qualifications. The median income was $47,500, compared with $41,500 nationally. 1,725 people (17.6%) earned over $100,000 compared to 12.1% nationally. The employment status of those at least 15 was that 5,217 (53.3%) people were employed full-time, 1,233 (12.6%) were part-time, and 162 (1.7%) were unemployed.

Individual statistical areas
Name	Area (km^{2})	Population	Density (per km^{2})	Dwellings	Median age	Median income
Flagstaff North West	0.94	2,046	2,177	612	35.7 years	$50,900
Flagstaff North East	0.90	3,093	3,437	879	33.2 years	$53,700
Flagstaff South	1.55	3,495	2,295	1,128	41.7 years	$46,600
Flagstaff East	1.82	4,143	2,276	1,491	39.7 years	$41,700
New Zealand					38.1 years	$41,500

== Education ==
Endeavour School and Te Ao Mārama School are coeducational contributing primary schools (years 1–6) with rolls of 442 and 491 students respectively as of July 2025. Endeavour opened in 2015 and Te Ao Mārama opened in 2019.

== See also ==
- List of streets in Hamilton
- Suburbs of Hamilton, New Zealand
