= Huntington, New Zealand =

Suburb of Hamilton, New Zealand

Huntington
- Suburb
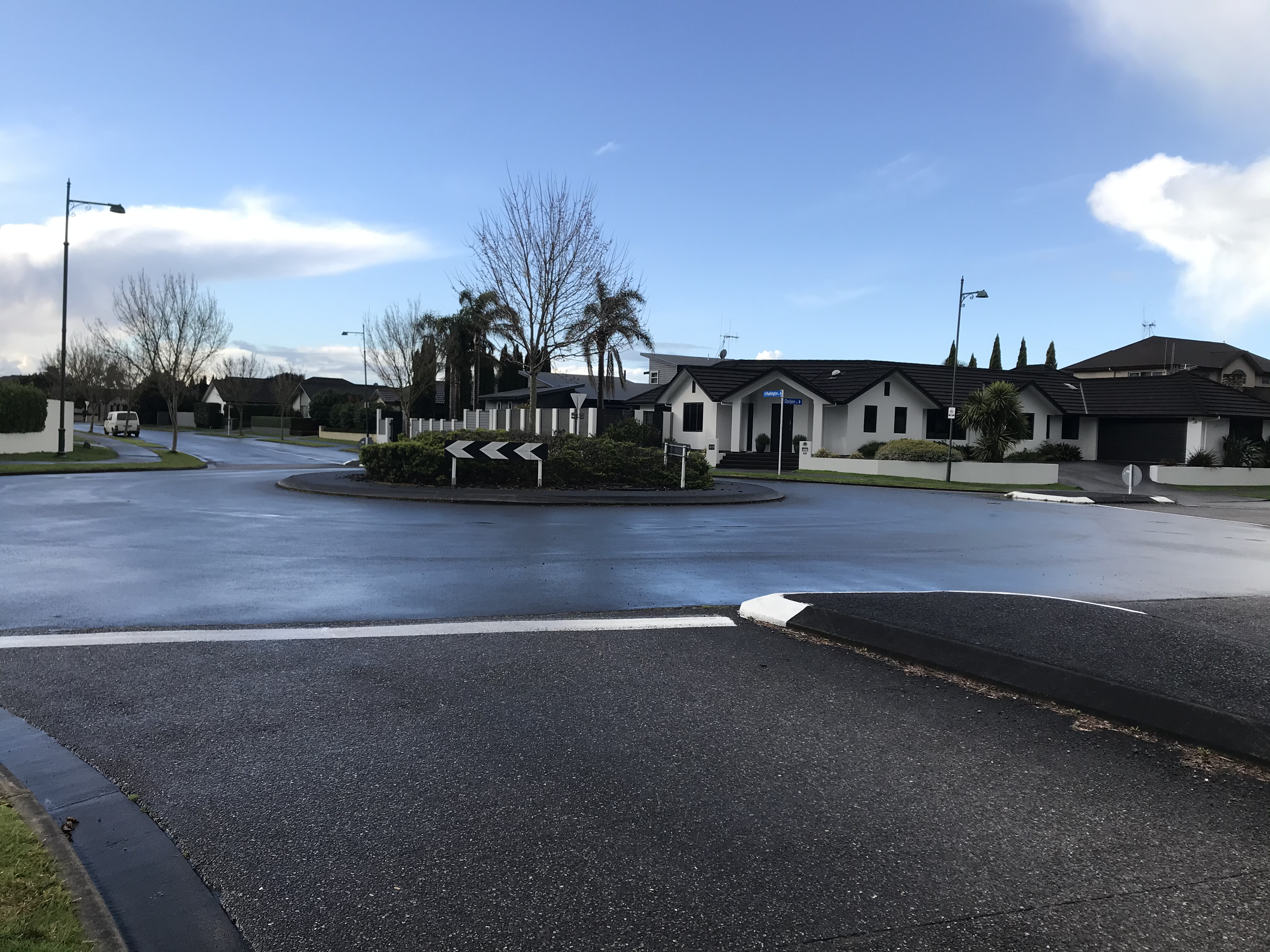
- Photograph of Huntington, Hamilton at the Darjon Rd and Huntington Drive roundabout.
- Interactive map of Huntington
- Coordinates: 37°44′34.05″S 175°16′54.18″E
- Country: New Zealand
- City: Hamilton, New Zealand
- Local authority: Hamilton City Council
- Electoral ward: East Ward
- Established: 1990s

Area
  - Land: 341 ha (840 acres)

Population (June 2025)
  - Total: 9,840
  - Density: 2,890/km^{2} (7,470/sq mi)

	St James Park	Puketaha
Rototuna	Huntington
Chartwell	Chedworth Park	Fairview Downs

Huntington is a suburb of Hamilton, New Zealand.

== Demographics ==
Huntington covers 3.41 km^{2} (1.32 sq mi) and had an estimated population of 9,840 as of June 2025, with a population density of 2,886 people per km^{2}.

Historical population
Year	Pop.	±% p.a.
2006	3,243	—
2013	6,975	+11.56%
2018	8,277	+3.48%
2023	8,832	+1.31%
The 2006 population is for a smaller area of 3.31 km^{2}. Source:

Huntington had a population of 8,832 in the 2023 New Zealand census, an increase of 555 people (6.7%) since the 2018 census, and an increase of 1,857 people (26.6%) since the 2013 census. There were 4,350 males, 4,461 females and 24 people of other genders in 2,820 dwellings. 2.6% of people identified as LGBTIQ+. The median age was 35.9 years (compared with 38.1 years nationally). There were 1,995 people (22.6%) aged under 15 years, 1,650 (18.7%) aged 15 to 29, 4,152 (47.0%) aged 30 to 64, and 1,035 (11.7%) aged 65 or older.

People could identify as more than one ethnicity. The results were 60.2% European (Pākehā); 12.4% Māori; 2.9% Pasifika; 31.5% Asian; 2.8% Middle Eastern, Latin American and African New Zealanders (MELAA); and 3.0% other, which includes people giving their ethnicity as "New Zealander". English was spoken by 92.8%, Māori language by 2.8%, Samoan by 0.4%, and other languages by 29.6%. No language could be spoken by 2.5% (e.g. too young to talk). New Zealand Sign Language was known by 0.3%. The percentage of people born overseas was 40.3, compared with 28.8% nationally.

Religious affiliations were 35.2% Christian, 5.0% Hindu, 3.1% Islam, 0.3% Māori religious beliefs, 1.3% Buddhist, 0.2% New Age, and 4.7% other religions. People who answered that they had no religion were 45.0%, and 5.3% of people did not answer the census question.

Of those at least 15 years old, 2,469 (36.1%) people had a bachelor's or higher degree, 3,012 (44.1%) had a post-high school certificate or diploma, and 1,365 (20.0%) people exclusively held high school qualifications. The median income was $50,800, compared with $41,500 nationally. 1,155 people (16.9%) earned over $100,000 compared to 12.1% nationally. The employment status of those at least 15 was that 3,873 (56.6%) people were employed full-time, 939 (13.7%) were part-time, and 168 (2.5%) were unemployed.

Individual statistical areas
Name	Area (km^{2})	Population	Density (per km^{2})	Dwellings	Median age	Median income
Te Manatu	1.41	4,296	962	1,356	32.9 years	$50,600
St James	0.73	2,025	2,774	627	35.7 years	$50,600
Huntington	1.26	2,511	1,993	837	43.7 years	$51,600
New Zealand					38.1 years	$41,500

== Education ==
Waikato Waldorf School is a coeducational state integrated school providing Waldorf education from kindergarten to Year 11. It has a roll of 182 as of July 2025. The school opened in 1996.

== See also ==
- List of streets in Hamilton
- Suburbs of Hamilton, New Zealand
