= Horsham Downs =

Locality in Waikato, New Zealand

- Locality
- Interactive map of Horsham Downs
- Coordinates: 37.699°S 175.250°E
- Country: New Zealand
- Region: Waikato
- District: Waikato District
- Wards: Newcastle-Ngāruawāhia General Ward; Tai Runga Takiwaa Maaori Ward
- Electorates: Waikato; Hauraki-Waikato (Māori)

Government
  - Territorial Authority: Waikato District Council
  - Regional council: Waikato Regional Council
  - Mayor of Waikato: Aksel Bech
  - Waikato MP: Tim van de Molen
  - Hauraki-Waikato MP: Hana-Rawhiti Maipi-Clarke

Area
  - Total: 15.79 km^{2} (6.10 sq mi)
- Elevation: 39 m (128 ft)

Population (June 2025)
  - Total: 880
  - Density: 56/km^{2} (140/sq mi)
- Time zone: UTC+12 (NZST)
  - Summer (DST): UTC+13 (NZDT)

Horsham Downs is a locality about 9.5 km north of Hamilton.

Before 1906, the area was undeveloped and covered in tea trees and ferns. After August 1906, sheep and cattle farms were successfully developed.

A group of protected areas, the Horsham Downs Wildlife Management Reserves, are located in Horsham Downs.

== Demographics ==
Horsham Downs covers 15.79 km^{2} (6.10 sq mi) and had an estimated population of 880 as of June 2025, with a population density of 56 people per km^{2}.

Historical population
Year	Pop.	±% p.a.
2006	537	—
2013	687	+3.58%
2018	714	+0.77%
2023	834	+3.16%

Horsham Downs had a population of 834 in the 2023 New Zealand census, an increase of 120 people (16.8%) since the 2018 census, and an increase of 147 people (21.4%) since the 2013 census. There were 411 males and 420 females in 270 dwellings. 2.5% of people identified as LGBTIQ+. The median age was 41.5 years (compared with 38.1 years nationally). There were 162 people (19.4%) aged under 15 years, 168 (20.1%) aged 15 to 29, 375 (45.0%) aged 30 to 64, and 129 (15.5%) aged 65 or older.

People could identify as more than one ethnicity. The results were 76.3% European (Pākehā); 13.3% Māori; 1.8% Pasifika; 18.3% Asian; 0.7% Middle Eastern, Latin American and African New Zealanders (MELAA); and 1.4% other, which includes people giving their ethnicity as "New Zealander". English was spoken by 93.9%, Māori language by 2.5%, and other languages by 16.9%. No language could be spoken by 1.8% (e.g. too young to talk). New Zealand Sign Language was known by 0.4%. The percentage of people born overseas was 23.4, compared with 28.8% nationally.

Religious affiliations were 38.1% Christian, 3.6% Hindu, 0.4% Māori religious beliefs, and 2.5% other religions. People who answered that they had no religion were 49.3%, and 6.8% of people did not answer the census question.

Of those at least 15 years old, 207 (30.8%) people had a bachelor's or higher degree, 324 (48.2%) had a post-high school certificate or diploma, and 135 (20.1%) people exclusively held high school qualifications. The median income was $53,700, compared with $41,500 nationally. 147 people (21.9%) earned over $100,000 compared to 12.1% nationally. The employment status of those at least 15 was that 354 (52.7%) people were employed full-time, 114 (17.0%) were part-time, and 9 (1.3%) were unemployed.

== Education ==
Horsham Downs School is a co-educational state primary school covering years 1 to 8, with a roll of 379 as of July 2026. The school opened in 1916, and has expanded as the suburbs of Hamilton have expanded northwards.
