= Mercer railway station =

Defunct railway station in New Zealand

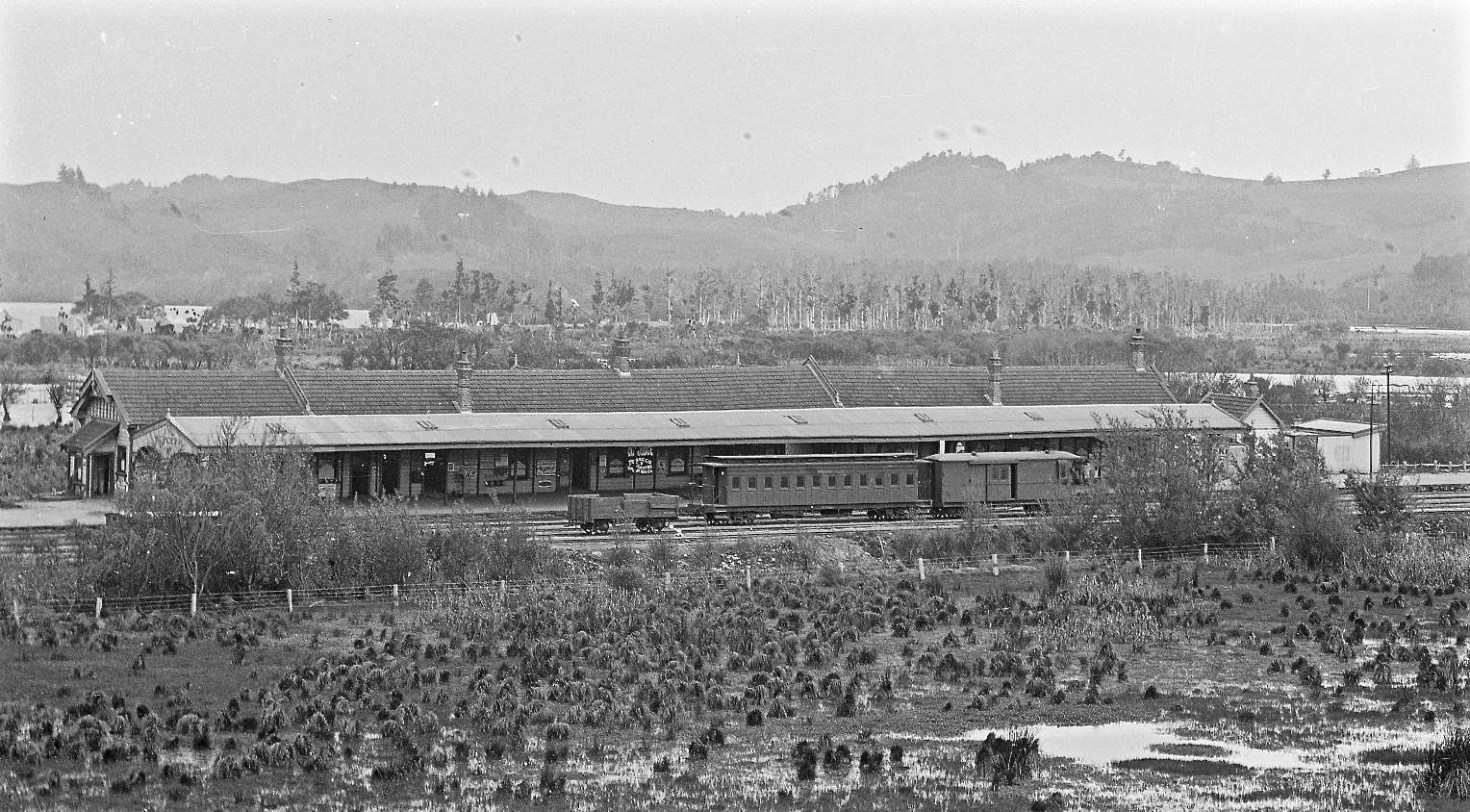
- 1910 Mercer station viewed from east with Waikato River in middle distance. Price, William Archer, 1866–1948 Collection of post card negatives. Ref: 1/2-001041-G. Alexander Turnbull Library, Wellington

General information
- Location: South Great Road, Mercer, New Zealand
- Coordinates: 37°16′39″S 175°02′52″E
- Elevation: 6 m (20 ft)
- Owner: KiwiRail Network
- Line: North Island Main Trunk
- Distance: Wellington 609.06 km (378.45 mi)
- Tracks: double track from 11 November 1951

History
- Opened: 20 May 1875
- Closed: to passengers by December 1975; 1993
- Rebuilt: 1879, 1902, 1959

Services
Preceding station	Historical railways	Following station
Pōkeno; Line open, station closed 4.6 km (2.9 mi) towards Auckland	North Island Main Trunk; KiwiRail	Amokura; Line open, station closed 4.63 km (2.88 mi) towards Wellington
Location

Mercer railway station in Mercer, New Zealand, is 72 km (45 mi) from Auckland and 609 km (378 mi) from Wellington on the North Island Main Trunk line. It opened on 20 May 1875 and was closed to passengers about 1970 and to goods in the 1990s. It burnt down in 1879 and also in 1900. Until 1958 it was the first refreshment stop south of Auckland.

In 1883 Mercer was 43 mi 54 ch (70.3 km) from Auckland and, from the opening of the new Auckland station in 1930, until Britomart replaced it in 2003, Mercer was 41 miles 69 chains from Auckland, via Newmarket, and 44 miles 5 chains via Ōrākei.

== History ==
The line was extended from Penrose to Mercer on 20 May 1875, though the pioneer British contractors, John Brogden & Sons, ran an excursion train the day before. The New Zealand Herald said, "This will be a busy station for some time to come, it being the terminus." It described the route as crossing Mangatawhiri swamp, then running beside the South Road, with a short branch line being constructed to connect with the Waikato Steam Navigation Company's (WSNC) boats. It said the station and other buildings were still being built. 'Some time to come' ended just over 2 years later, when the line was extended to Ngāruawāhia on 13 August 1877.

The service began with two trains per day each way between Auckland and Mercer taking 2hrs 50mins. The station was unfinished when the railway opened.

=== Refreshment room ===
The refreshment room was built by 10 August 1877 for £245 and extended in 1878/79 for £180. An 1880 advert for reopening of the refreshment room said trains waited 20 minutes. Until New Zealand Railways took over in 1917, the Mercer Railway Hotel, opposite the original station, managed the refreshment room. The hotel was rebuilt in 1898, with 15 bedrooms, 3 sitting rooms and a 50-seat dining room. The refreshment room gained importance when dining cars on main trunk expresses were removed as a wartime measure. The refreshment room was the target of poet A. R. D Fairburn's, with his famous quip. "The thought occurs to those who are entrained: The squalid tea of Mercer is not strained." Sit-down” meals were discontinued from 13 December 1923. From 1940 a hostel accommodated female refreshment room staff. On Tuesday, 28 October 1958 the refreshment room closed, following the introduction of railcars. It had employed 4 to 12 staff.

=== Flooding ===
Until the Lower Waikato-Waipa Flood Control Scheme was built, between 1961 and 1983, the station area regularly flooded, including in 1906, 1907, 1917, 1924, 1925

=== 1879 station ===
The original station burnt down on 19 May 1879, due to an old stove in the refreshment room. A new station opened on 4 October 1879. In 1883 a plan was made to re-arrange the station. By 1884 there was a special station, platform, cart approach, 20 ft (6.1 m) x 15 ft (4.6 m) goods sheds and another of 63 ft (19 m) x 25 ft (7.6 m) for WSNC, loading bank, crane, water, coal, turntable, wagon turntable, engine shed, fixed signals, stationmaster's house, urinals and a passing loop for 50 wagons. A verandah was added in 1893. Only the chimneys were left standing after the 1879 station was also destroyed by a fire begun in the refreshment room, on 23 December 1900. A temporary station was formed from 5 huts, which had housed prisoners at Rotorua.

=== Goods ===
In 1889 provision was made for loading sheep and in 1890 cattle yards and in 1896 sheep yards were added. By 1911 the goods shed had been extended to 30 ft (9.1 m) x 20 ft (6.1 m).

=== 1902 station ===
The new station opened on 2 June 1902, described as, "a long wood and iron building, which contains a large refreshment room and bar, ladies' room, public room, booking office, stationmaster's room, and post and telegraph department. There is also a large engine shed, besides a pump house and coal shed, and there are eight cottages in the immediate vicinity", with 9 staff – stationmaster, porter, cadet, 2 engine drivers, 2 firemen, and 2 greasers. There was criticism of the small bar, refreshment and luncheon room entrances and improvements were made in 1908, 1916 and 1919. There was also criticism that it was further north than the old one, on lower, swampier, land, requiring it to be supported. By the time of the 1907 flood the station had further tilted. By 1956 its floor had a 1 in 12 slope, leading to its demolition in 1958. In 1907 Mercer was one of three stations in the Auckland Section to get a larger 55 ft (17 m) turntable, the others being Rotorua, and Taumarunui.

=== Double tracking ===
From Sunday, 11 November 1951 Tuakau to Mercer had 6 mi 63 ch (10.9 km) of double track and from Sunday, 1 July 1956 from Mercer to Mile Peg 44, 1 mi 64 ch (2.9 km) was also doubled.

=== 1959 station ===
A new 64 ft (20 m) x 19 ft (5.8 m) station, with a 4 ft (1.2 m) verandah, costing £9,000, opened on Sunday 16 August 1959. It was sold in October 1987. In 1982 the goods shed was sold to Cooks New Zealand Wine Co Ltd. By November 1987 there was no station, or platform and only a small goods shed and low level loading bank remained.

=== Railway houses ===
A stationmaster's house was built in 1878 and in 1882 two 5th class stationmasters' houses were built. By 1884 there were 4 stationmasters' houses. In 1882 four additional cottages were proposed at Mercer, in March 1884 platelayers' cottages were finished, in 1896 additions were made to cottage No 105. and in 1898 a house was provided for a pumper. In 1955 a new chlorinated water supply for the railway houses, station, police station and town hall cost £8,000, replaced untreated water from the Waikato River, which continued to be used for locomotives.

=== Post office ===
On 20 May 1875 a Post Office operated by Postal Department staff opened, which from 11 August 1885 also took on railway duties and from 16 February 1903 was operated by Railways Department staff. On 1 September 1929 it was moved from the station.

=== Wharf ===
From the beginning a branch ran down the main street to a wharf on the Waikato River to link the railway with places upstream, including a steam crane operated by WSNC. In March 1884 a 3-ton steam crane for working coal was added. A 1½ ton crane on Mercer Wharf was moved to Te Puke in 1929.

=== Gallery ===
Images of the station in date order (for other photos see External links below) -

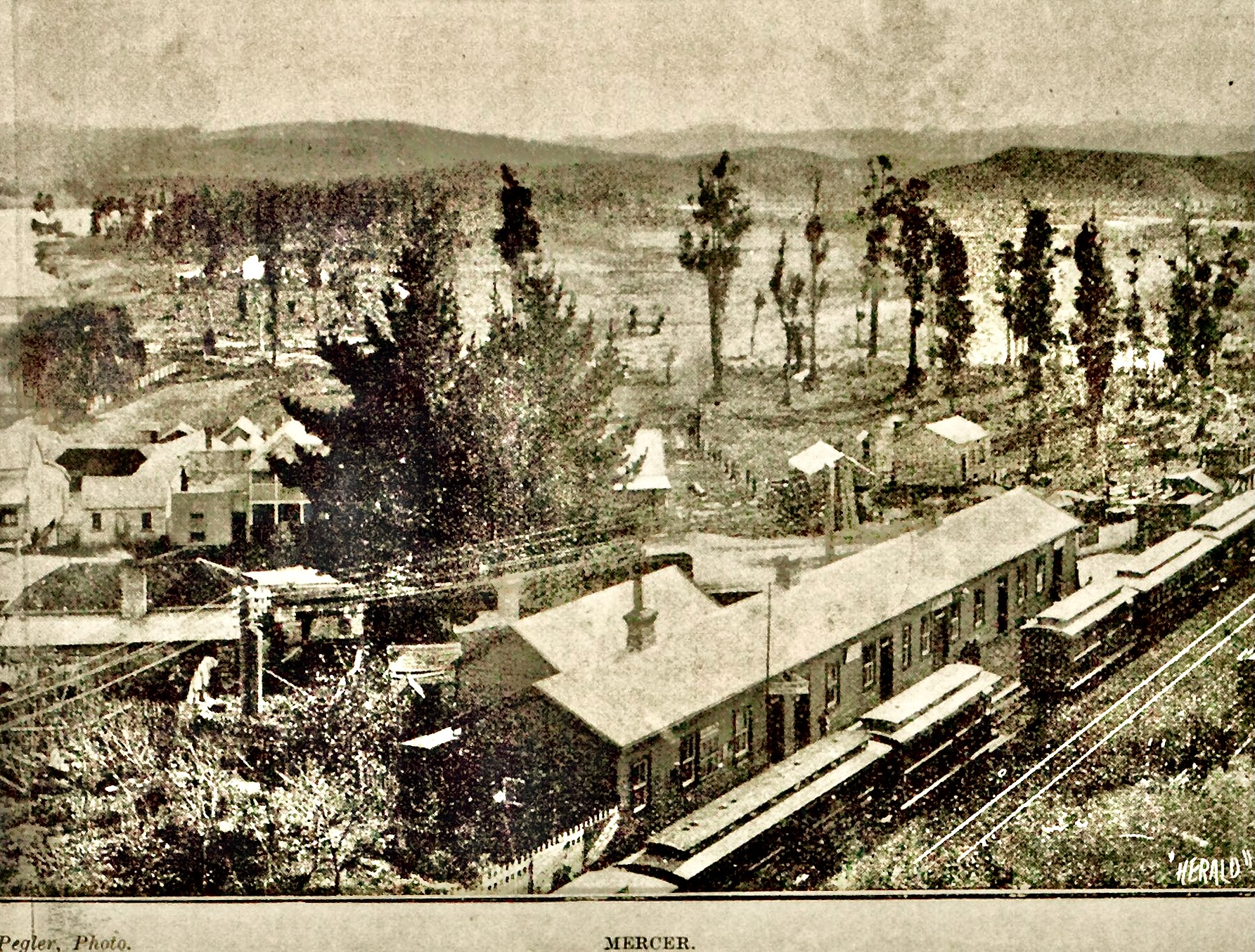
Before 1893 verandah

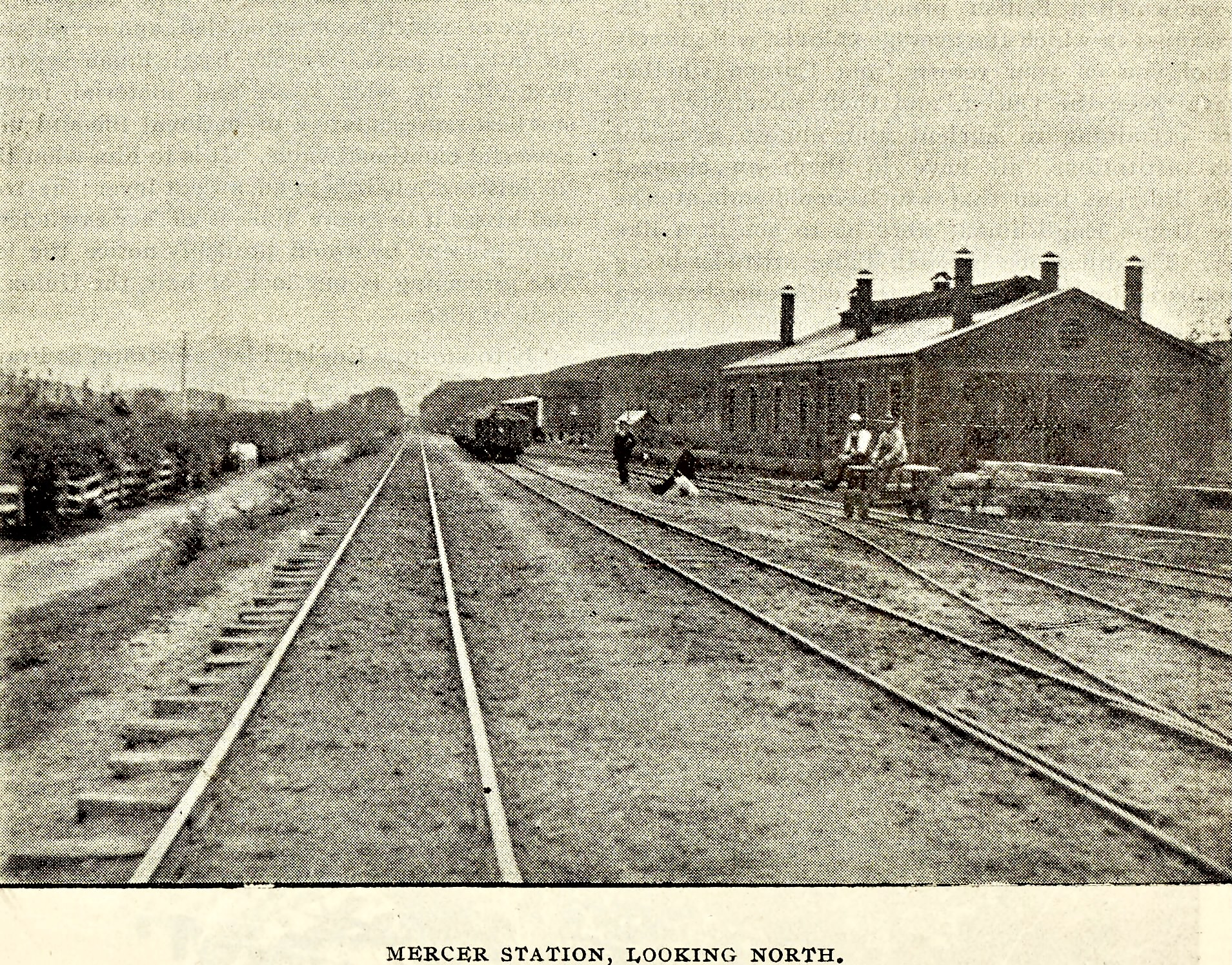
1896 engine shed

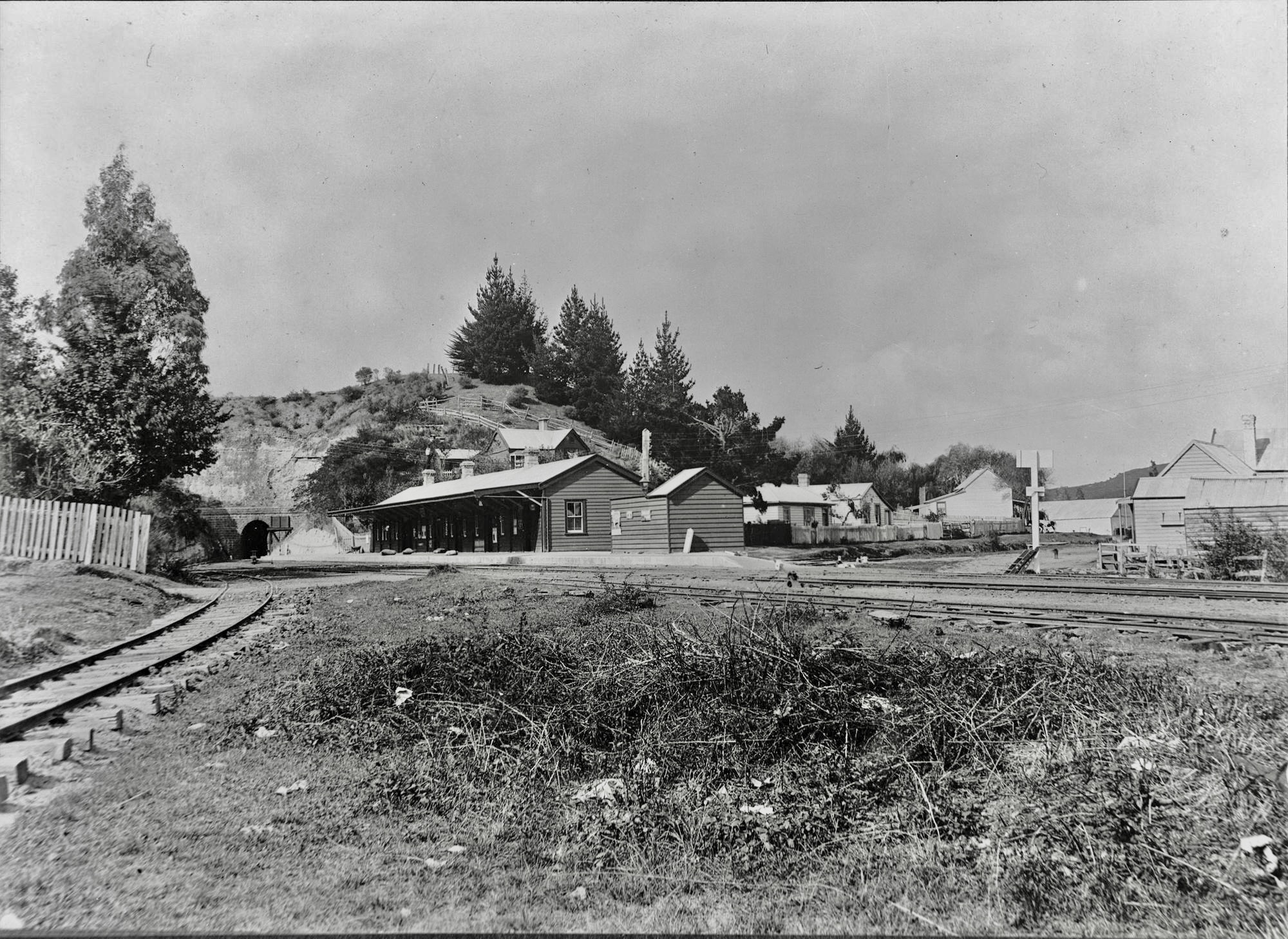
1890s station and tunnel

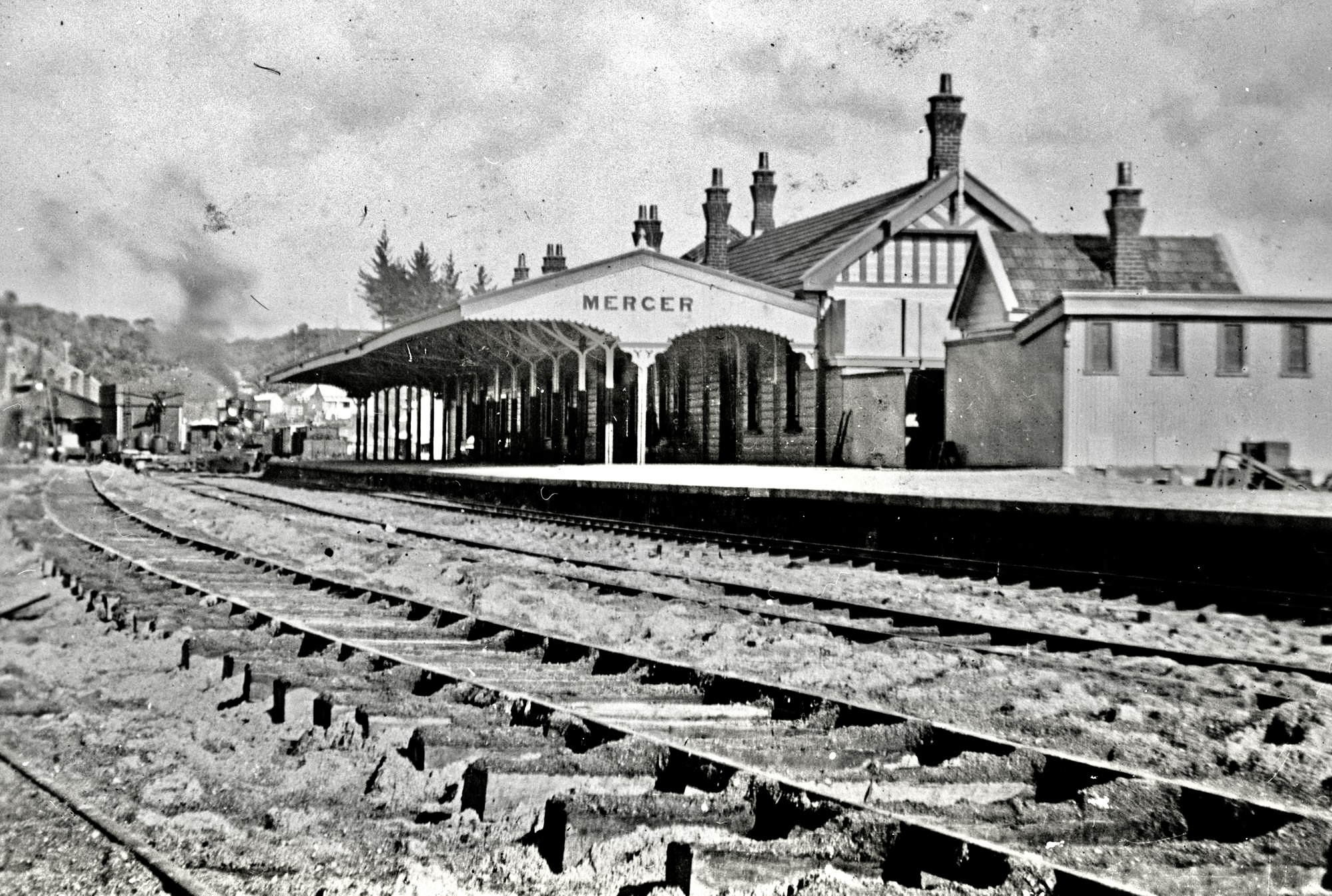
About 1902

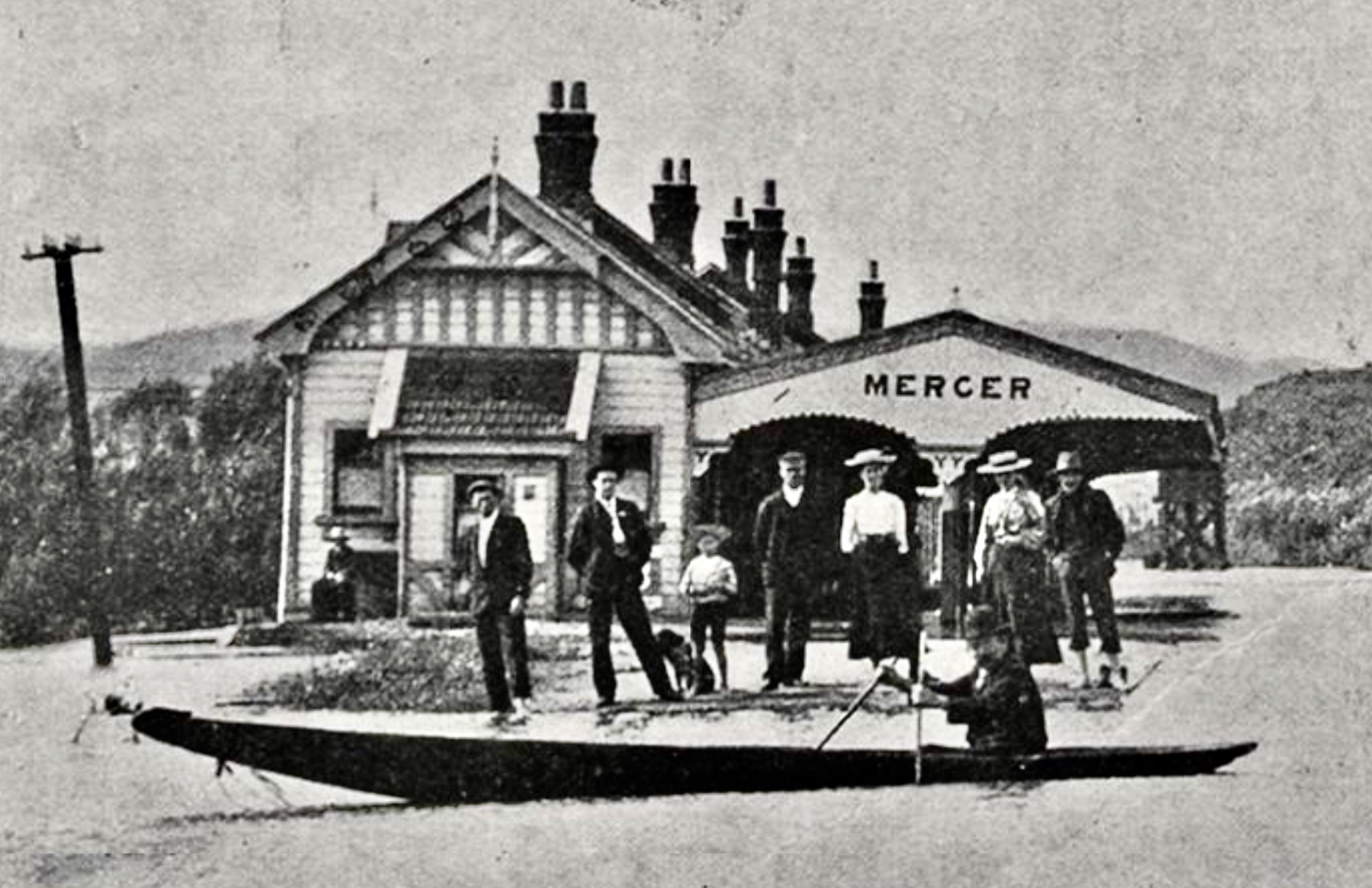
1907 flood

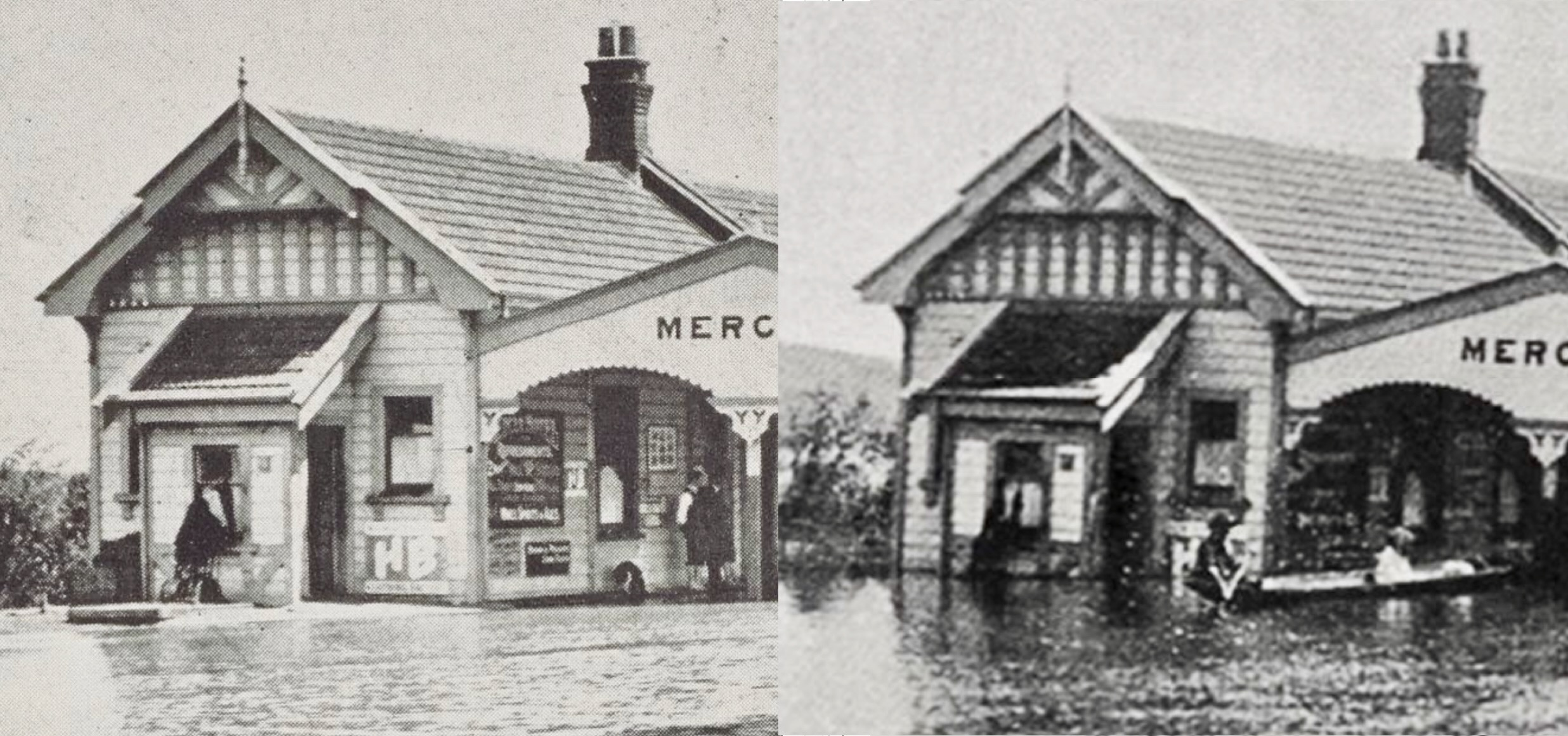
Progress of 1907 flood and tilt of the station

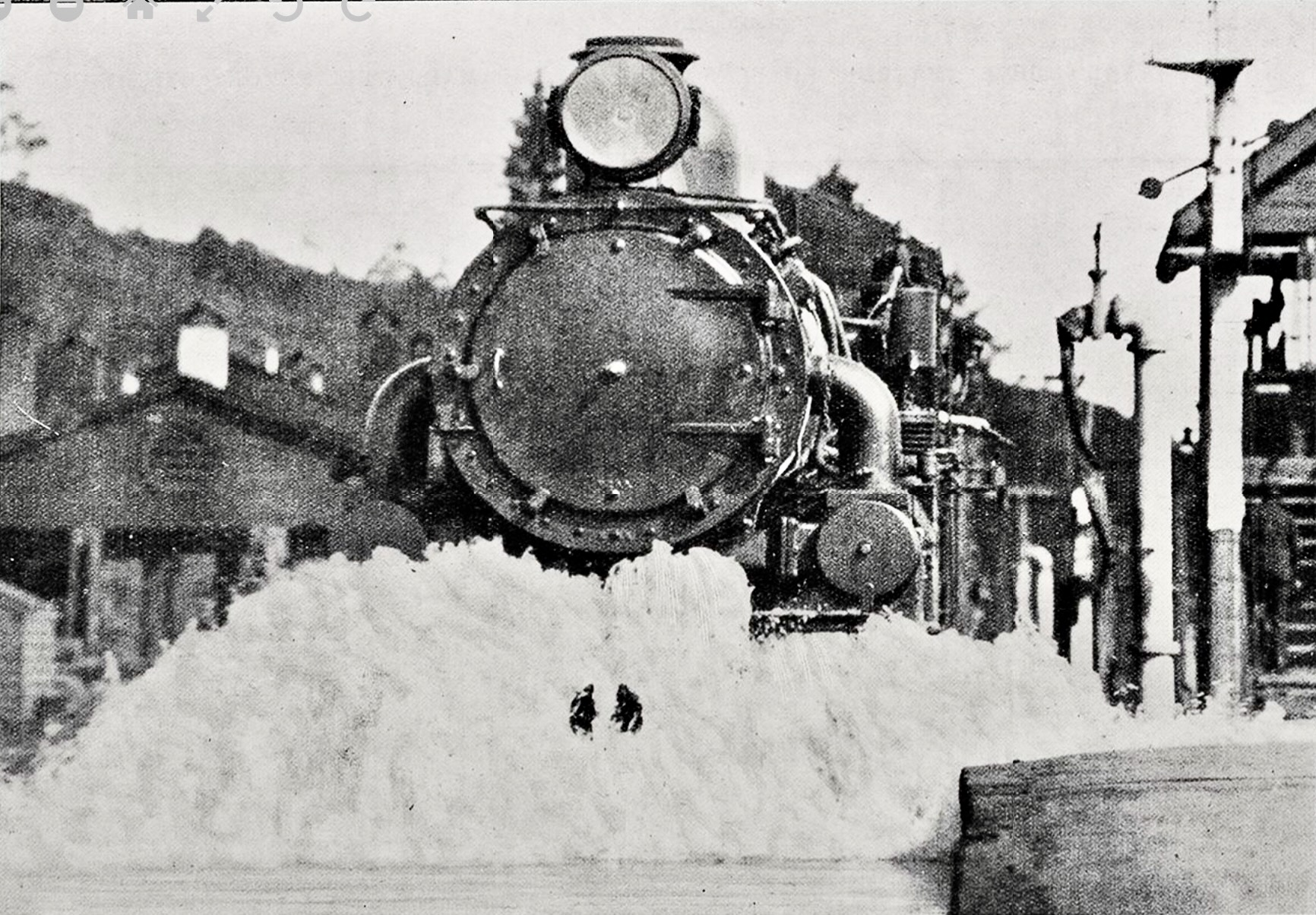
Rotorua express in 1907 flood

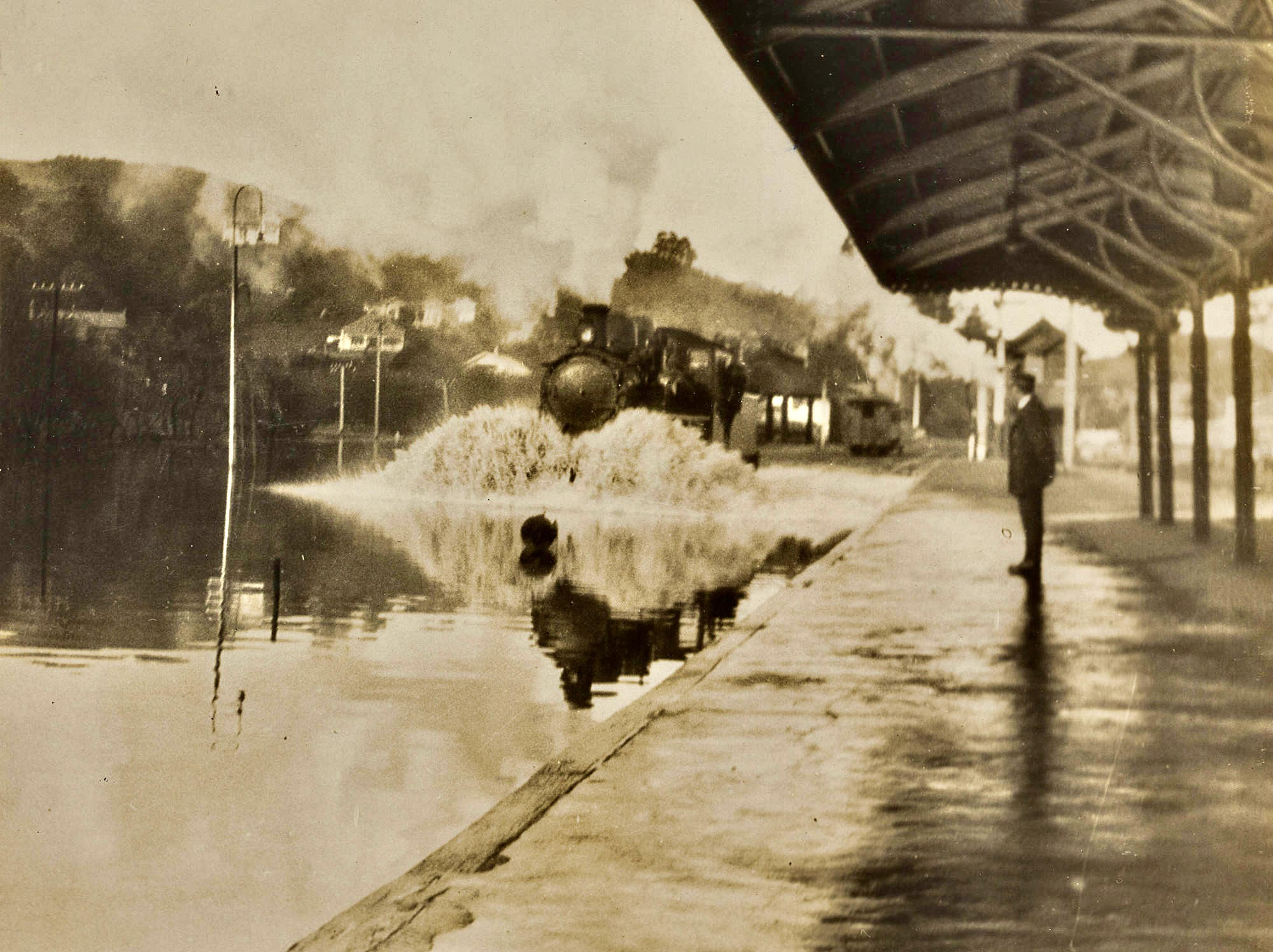
1925 flood

=== Patronage ===
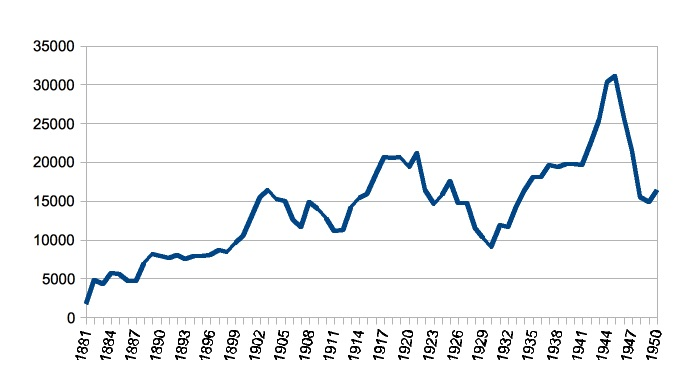
tickets sales 1881–1950 – derived from annual returns to Parliament of "Statement of Revenue for each Station for the Year ended"

Traffic grew to a peak in World War 2, as shown in the graph and table below.

year	tickets	season tickets	staff	ref.
1881	1,763		3	
1882	4,824		1	
1883	4,330		3	
1884	5,726		4	
1885	5,536	2	5	
1886	4,614	5	4	
1887	4,675	1	2	
1888	7,045	5	2	
1889	8,127	3	3	
1890				
1891	7,686	3	3	
1892	7,969	3	3	
1893	7,519	5	3	
1894	7,869	5	4	
1895	7,951	7	4	
1896	7,953	4	4	
1897	8,652	4	5	
1898	8,446	6	5	
1899	9,605	3	5	
1900	10,482	3	5	
1901				
1902	15,449		6	
1903	16,365	1	8	
1904	15,183	1	9	
1905	14,912	14	9	
1906	12,529	21	11	
1907	11,619	29	10	
1908	14,898	4	12	
1909	13,977	8	12	
1910	12,768	9	12	
1911	11,055	20	11	
1912	11,295	13	17	
1913	14,199	52	17	
1914	15,337	156		
1915	15,898	144		
1916	18,400	135		
1917	20,601	113		
1918	20,560	154		
1919	20,680	111		
1920	19,363	142		
1921	21,203	125		
1922	16,450	106		
1923	14,535	101		
1924	15,700	102		
1925	17,615	107		
1926	14,711	107		
1927	14,696	68		
1928	11,536	84		
1929	10,218	133		
1930	9,110	133		
1931	11,892	94		
1932	11,587	95		
1933	14,141	99		
1934	16,227	131		
1935	18,030	127		
1936	18,030	124		
1937	19,560	111		
1938	19,365	138		
1939	19,802	175		
1940	19,718	114		
1941	19,667	128		
1942	22,580	89		
1943	25,422	92		
1944	30,297	166		
1945	31,073	145		
1946	25,651	119		
1947	21,410	185		
1948	15,495	478		
1949	14,838	337		
1950	16,452	240		

=== Accidents and tunnel ===
An engine cleaner died in 1899 after trying to jump onto a moving engine.

A Wellington to Auckland "Limited" express derailed on 28 October 1940 killing the driver and fireman and injuring 12 passengers. An estimate put the speed at 75 mph (though some at the inquiry gave evidence of normal speed) on the 30 mph (48 km/h) 8-chain radius curve, just south of the station, near the former 30.5 m (100 ft) tunnel opened out in 1937. The engine, K900, tipped on its side and was overrun by six carriages. Removal of the tunnel allowed double tracking and easing of the speed limit to 45 mph (72 km/h). The curve has been greatly eased in the 2006 Mercer to Long Swamp Expressway 4-laning of 12 km of SH1, which included this 1 km of rail deviation.

Another derailment at Mercer was on 3 September 2013, when a freight train blocked both the road and railway.

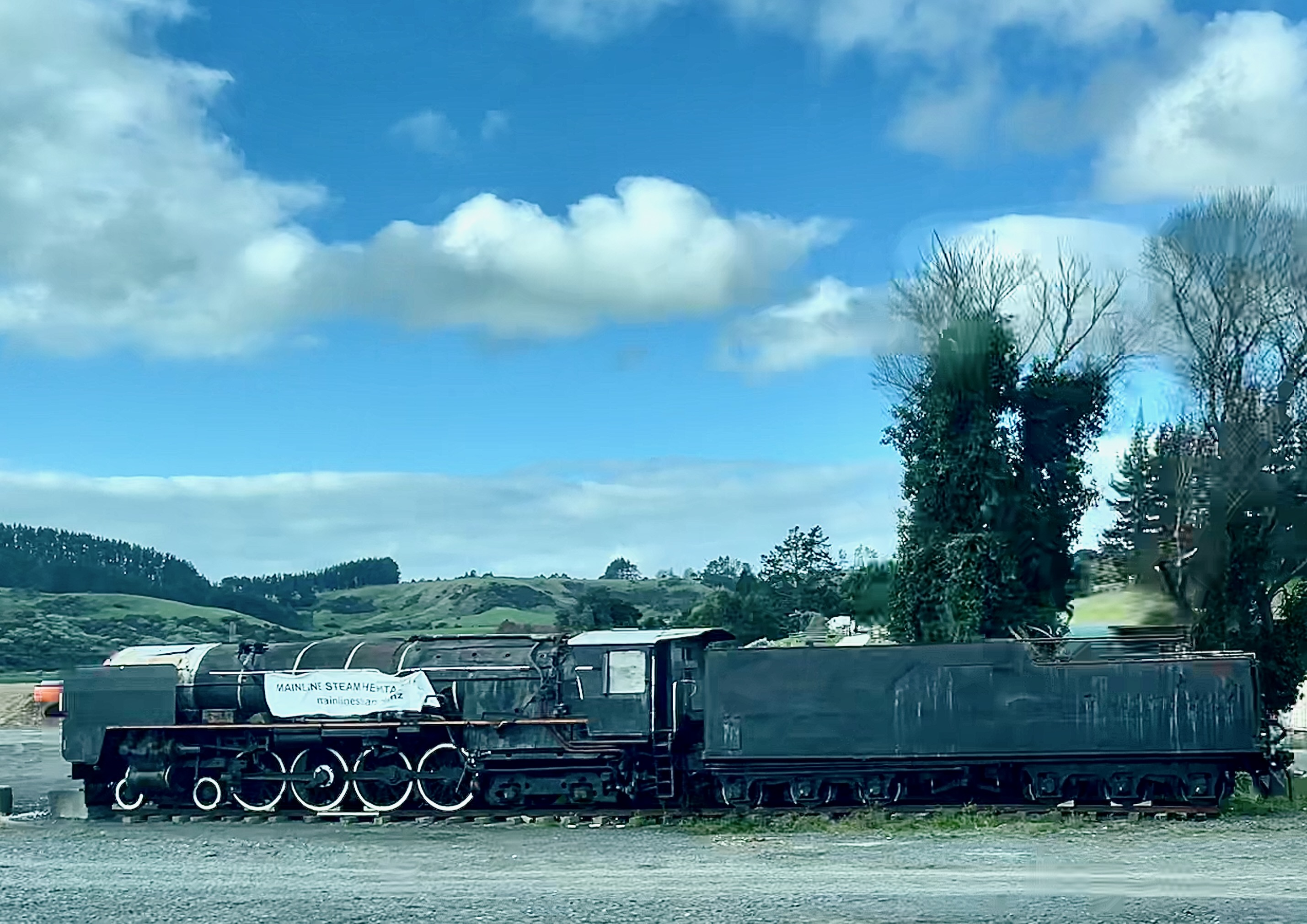
One of three South African locomotives at Mercer

== Mainline Steam depot ==
Heritage operator Mainline Steam Heritage Trust is developing a new depot at Mercer. By June 2020 three of their locomotives were stored in a siding at Mercer.

== Future services ==
In 2011 a feasibility report on reinstating passenger services said a station with a platform 155m long and 750mm high for 6-car trains would cost $4m. The proposal was shelved. It is believed by some that the figure is overly inflated to kill off the proposal. Today, the Te Huia Hamilton - Papakura services passes Mercer but does not stop.
