= Whangarata railway station =

Defunct railway station in New Zealand

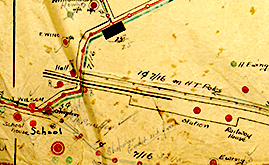
- Map of Whangarata railway station in 1920s

General information
- Location: Pokeno Road, Whangarata, New Zealand
- Coordinates: 37.260°S 174.987°E
- Line: North Island Main Trunk
- Platforms: 2
- Tracks: 2

History
- Opened: 20 May 1875
- Closed: 3 October 1966

Services
Preceding station	Historical railways	Following station
Tuakau; Line open, station closed 4.39 km (2.73 mi)	North Island Main Trunk; KiwiRail	Pokeno; Line open, station closed 3.17 km (1.97 mi)
Location

Whangarata railway station was a station on the North Island Main Trunk, and in the Waikato region of New Zealand. It was originally known as Wangarata.

The station was opened on 20 May 1875, and was closed on 3 October 1966.

Whangarata was a flag station, 37 mi (60 km) south of Auckland. It was on a steep gradient, 618.4 km (384.3 mi) north of Wellington, 3.17 km (1.97 mi) east of Tuakau, 4.28 km (2.66 mi) west of Pokeno and 60 m (200 ft) above sea level.

A deviation in 1914 allowed for an easier curve and gradient.

Preceding station	Historical railways	Following station
Tuakau; Line open, station closed	North Island Main Trunk; New Zealand Railways Department	Pokeno; Line open, station closed
