= Tuakau railway station =

Defunct railway station in New Zealand

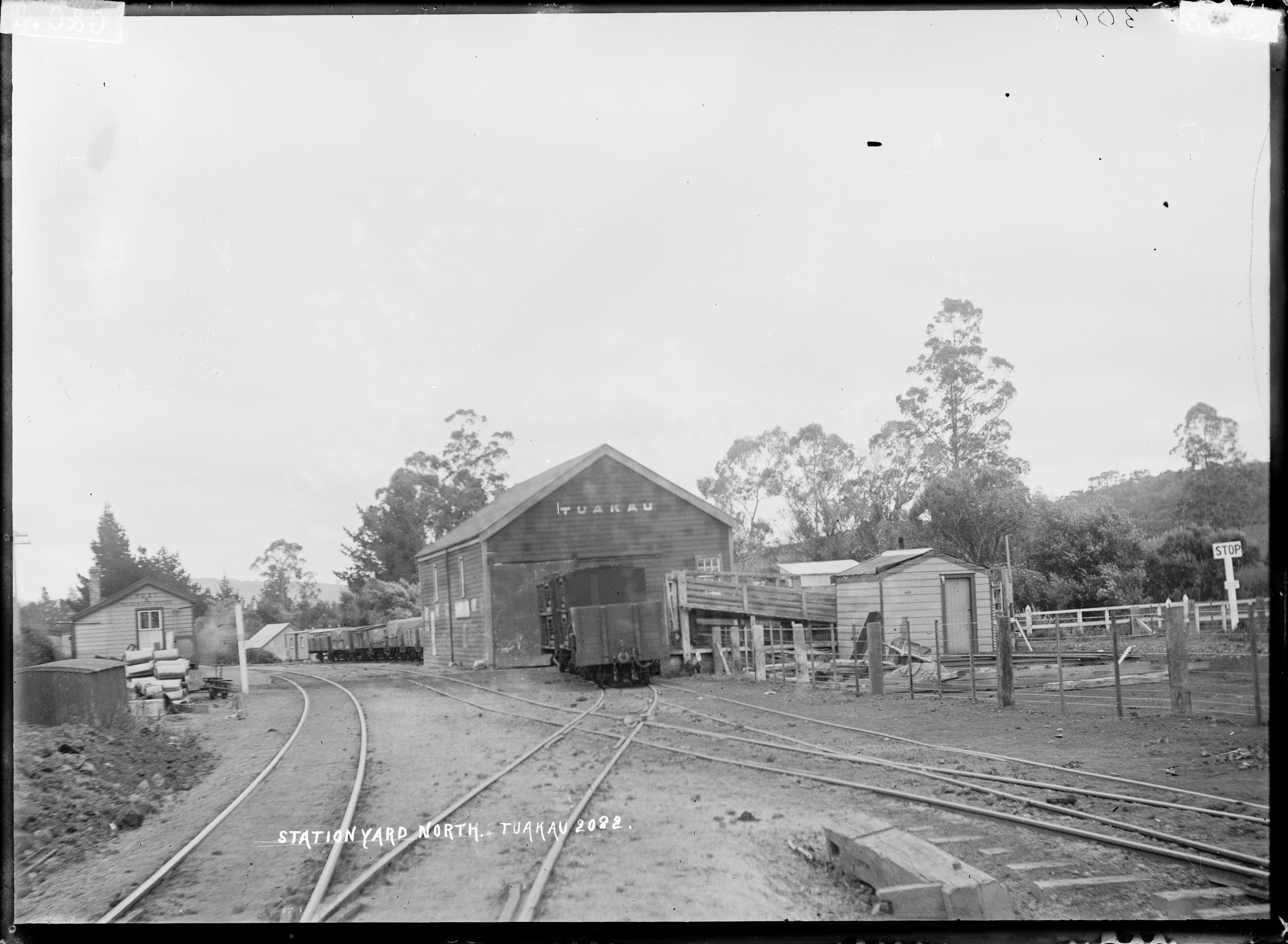
- Railway yard at Tuakau about 1920

General information
- Location: Dominion Road, Tuakau, New Zealand
- Coordinates: 37.258411°S 174.950409°E
- Elevation: 37 m (121 ft)
- Line: North Island Main Trunk
- Distance: Wellington 621.31 km (386.06 mi)
- Platforms: 2
- Tracks: double to Mercer 11 November 1951 and to Paerata from 21 Nov 1954

History
- Opened: 20 May 1875
- Closed: 2 March 1986
- Rebuilt: 1910
- Former names: Tuakau Road

Services
Preceding station	Historical railways	Following station
Buckland; Line open, station closed 4.39 km (2.73 mi)	North Island Main Trunk; KiwiRail	Whangarata; Line open, station closed 3.17 km (1.97 mi)
Location

Tuakau railway station was a railway station (now closed) in the town of Tuakau in the Waikato District of New Zealand.

The station was on the North Island Main Trunk line, and opened on 20 May 1875. Originally it was called Tuakau Road.

Tuakau was 34 mi 51 ch (55.7 km) south of Auckland (via Newmarket) and 36 mi 67 ch (59.3 km) (via Orakei).

The station was rebuilt in 1910, opening on 10 September 1911, and closed to passengers on 14 March 1983. The station closed on 2 March 1986.

The station was on the route of the former Waikato Connection, although it did not stop at Tuakau. The Hamilton-Auckland passenger service is to resume as Te Huia in 2020; and as the new service may stop at Tuakau, in 2018 the District Council allocated money for reopening the station. In 2020 reopening of the platform was put forward as part of a scheme to help the region recover from the economic impact of the COVID-19 pandemic, at an estimated cost of $15m.

== History ==
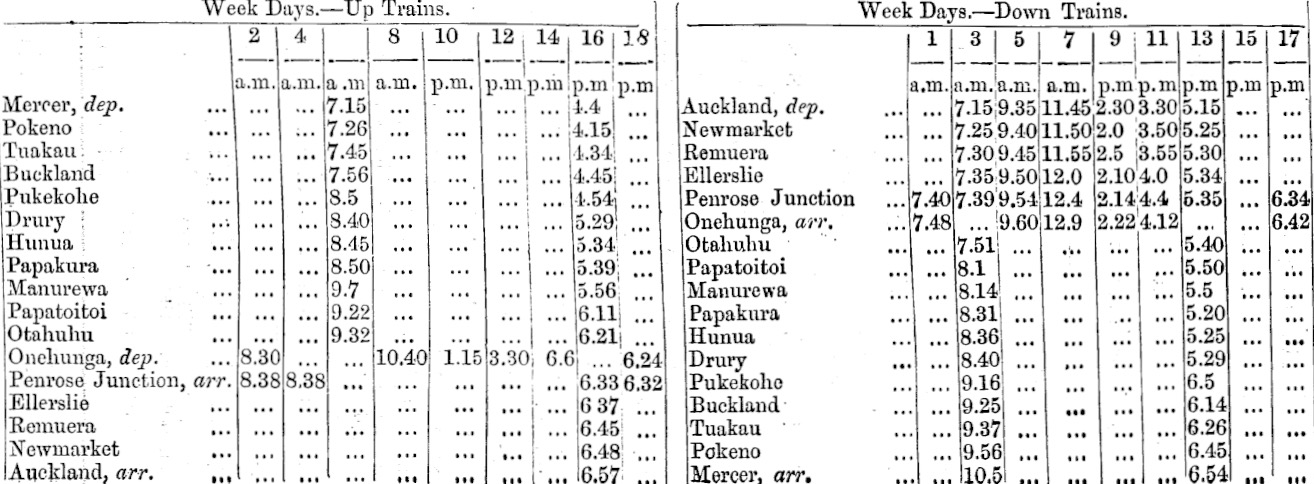
Auckland & Mercer Railway timetable 1876

The railway, some 1.5 mi (2.4 km) north of the original Tuakau village, opened as part of the Auckland and Mercer Railway on 20 May 1875, built by Brogden & Co, when it was extended from Penrose. Trains had been able to reach Tuakau since at least February 1875. Tuakau wasn't shown in the 1875 timetable, but was in that of 1876. There was a stationmaster by June 1876 and fencing of the stationmaster's house was mentioned in September 1878.

By 1884 Tuakau had a 4th class station, platform, cart approach, 60 ft (18 m) by 30 ft (9.1 m) goods shed (extended to 90 ft (27 m) in 1905 and sold in 1985), loading bank, cattle yards, stationmaster's house, urinals and a passing loop for 15 wagons. From 1887 to 1911 a Post Office was run by railway staff. The station was rebuilt in 1910, opening on 10 September 1911, From 1913 it was moved away from the station. A state house was added in 1956.

The stockyards were sold in 1974 and Tuakau closed to passengers and all goods traffic, except in wagon lots, on 14 March 1983. By then there was an island platform, station building, footbridge, low-level loading bank, fitter's shed and New Zealand Co-op Dairy Co's siding at the north end. The station closed on 2 March 1986.

Passenger numbers reached a peak during the Second World War, as shown in the graph and table below.

year	tickets	season tickets	staff	source	title
1885	2,593	18	1	https://paperspast.natlib.govt.nz/parliamentary/appendix-to-the-journals-of-the-house-of-representatives/1885/I/1156	RETURN No. 10. STATEMENT of Revenue and Expenditure of each Station for the Twelve Months ending 31 March 1885
1886	2,128	70	1	https://paperspast.natlib.govt.nz/parliamentary/appendix-to-the-journals-of-the-house-of-representatives/1886/I/1138	RETURN No. 10. STATEMENT of Revenue and Expenditure of each Station for the Twelve Months ending 31 March 1886
1887	2,456	76	1	https://paperspast.natlib.govt.nz/parliamentary/appendix-to-the-journals-of-the-house-of-representatives/1887/I/920	RETURN No. 10. STATEMENT of Revenue and Expenditure of each Station for the Twelve Months ending 31 March 1887
1888	2,007	47	1	https://paperspast.natlib.govt.nz/parliamentary/appendix-to-the-journals-of-the-house-of-representatives/1889/I/1068?large_image=true	RETURN No. 10. STATEMENT of Revenue and Expenditure of each Station for the Twelve Months ending 31 March 1888
1889	2,569	31	1	https://paperspast.natlib.govt.nz/parliamentary/appendix-to-the-journals-of-the-house-of-representatives/1889/I/1068	RETURN No. 10. STATEMENT of Revenue and Expenditure of each Station for the Twelve Months ending 31 March 1889
1891	2,118	29	1	https://paperspast.natlib.govt.nz/parliamentary/appendix-to-the-journals-of-the-house-of-representatives/1891/II/1264	RETURN No. 10. STATEMENT of Revenue and Expenditure of each Station for the Twelve Months ending 31 March 1891
1892	2,505	48	1	https://paperspast.natlib.govt.nz/parliamentary/appendix-to-the-journals-of-the-house-of-representatives/1892/I/1164	RETURN No. 10. STATEMENT of Revenue and Expenditure of each Station for the Twelve Months ending 31 March 1892
1893	2,353	22	1	https://paperspast.natlib.govt.nz/parliamentary/appendix-to-the-journals-of-the-house-of-representatives/1893/I/1494	RETURN No. 10. STATEMENT of Revenue and Expenditure of each Station for the Twelve Months ending 31 March 1893
1894	2,424	8	1	https://paperspast.natlib.govt.nz/parliamentary/appendix-to-the-journals-of-the-house-of-representatives/1894/I/1388	RETURN No. 10. STATEMENT of Revenue and Expenditure of each Station for the Twelve Months ending 31 March 1894
1895	2,336	16	1	https://paperspast.natlib.govt.nz/parliamentary/appendix-to-the-journals-of-the-house-of-representatives/1895/I/1586	RETURN No. 10. STATEMENT of Revenue and Expenditure of each Station for the Twelve Months ending 31 March 1895
1896	2,444	10	1	https://paperspast.natlib.govt.nz/parliamentary/appendix-to-the-journals-of-the-house-of-representatives/1896/I/1624	RETURN No. 10. STATEMENT of Revenue and Expenditure of each Station for the Twelve Months ending 31 March 1896
1897	2,643	3	1	https://paperspast.natlib.govt.nz/parliamentary/appendix-to-the-journals-of-the-house-of-representatives/1897/II/1610	RETURN No. 12. STATEMENT of Revenue and Expenditure of each Station for the Year ended 31 March 1897
1898	3,199	3	2	https://paperspast.natlib.govt.nz/parliamentary/appendix-to-the-journals-of-the-house-of-representatives/1898/I/1670	RETURN No. 12. STATEMENT of Revenue and Expenditure of each Station for the Year ended 31 March 1898
1899	3,998	10	2	https://paperspast.natlib.govt.nz/parliamentary/appendix-to-the-journals-of-the-house-of-representatives/1899/I/1824	RETURN No. 12. STATEMENT of Revenue and Expenditure of each Station for the Year ended 31 March 1899
1900	4,277	14	2	https://paperspast.natlib.govt.nz/parliamentary/appendix-to-the-journals-of-the-house-of-representatives/1900/I/1612	RETURN No. 12. STATEMENT of Revenue and Expenditure of each Station for the Year ended 31 March 1900
1902	6,742	33	2	https://paperspast.natlib.govt.nz/parliamentary/appendix-to-the-journals-of-the-house-of-representatives/1902/I/1436	RETURN No. 12. STATEMENT of Revenue and Expenditure of each Station for the Year ended 31 March 1902
1903	7,871	35	3	https://paperspast.natlib.govt.nz/parliamentary/appendix-to-the-journals-of-the-house-of-representatives/1903/I/1873	RETURN No. 12. STATEMENT of Revenue and Expenditure of each Station for the Year ended 31 March 1903
1904	8,638	52	3	https://paperspast.natlib.govt.nz/parliamentary/appendix-to-the-journals-of-the-house-of-representatives/1904/I/1848	RETURN No. 12. STATEMENT of Revenue and Expenditure of each Station for the Year ended 31 March 1904
1905	8,466	53	4	https://paperspast.natlib.govt.nz/parliamentary/appendix-to-the-journals-of-the-house-of-representatives/1905/I/3767	RETURN No. 12. STATEMENT of Revenue and Expenditure of each Station for the Year ended 31 March 1905
1906	7,782	40	4	https://paperspast.natlib.govt.nz/parliamentary/appendix-to-the-journals-of-the-house-of-representatives/1906/II/1600	RETURN No. 12. STATEMENT of Revenue and Expenditure of each Station for the Year ended 31 March 1906
1907	8,711	60	5	https://paperspast.natlib.govt.nz/parliamentary/appendix-to-the-journals-of-the-house-of-representatives/1907/I/2542	RETURN No. 12. STATEMENT of Revenue and Expenditure of each Station for the Year ended 31 March 1907
1908	9,644	61	3	https://paperspast.natlib.govt.nz/parliamentary/appendix-to-the-journals-of-the-house-of-representatives/1908/I/2061	RETURN No. 12. STATEMENT of Revenue and Expenditure of each Station for the Year ended 31 March 1908
1909	9,352	47	3	https://paperspast.natlib.govt.nz/parliamentary/appendix-to-the-journals-of-the-house-of-representatives/1909/II/1832	RETURN No. 12. STATEMENT of Revenue and Expenditure of each Station for the Year ended 31 March 1909
1910	10,001	33	3	https://paperspast.natlib.govt.nz/parliamentary/appendix-to-the-journals-of-the-house-of-representatives/1910/I/2050	RETURN No. 12. STATEMENT of Revenue and Expenditure of each Station for the Year ended 31 March 1910
1911	11,940	74	3	https://paperspast.natlib.govt.nz/parliamentary/appendix-to-the-journals-of-the-house-of-representatives/1911/I/2497	RETURN No. 12. STATEMENT of Revenue and Expenditure of each Station for the Year ended 31 March 1911
1912	12,709	33	4	https://paperspast.natlib.govt.nz/parliamentary/appendix-to-the-journals-of-the-house-of-representatives/1912/II/2420	RETURN No. 12. STATEMENT of Revenue and Expenditure of each Station for the Year ended 31 March 1912
1913	14,603	163	5	https://paperspast.natlib.govt.nz/parliamentary/appendix-to-the-journals-of-the-house-of-representatives/1913/I/3693	RETURN No. 12. STATEMENT of Revenue and Expenditure of each Station for the Year ended 31 March 1913
1914	15,032	249		https://paperspast.natlib.govt.nz/parliamentary/appendix-to-the-journals-of-the-house-of-representatives/1914/I/2031	RETURN No. 12. Statement of Revenue for each Station for the Year ended 31 March 1914
1915	14,140	234		https://paperspast.natlib.govt.nz/parliamentary/appendix-to-the-journals-of-the-house-of-representatives/1915/I/1638	RETURN No. 12. Statement of Revenue for each Station for the Year ended 31 March 1915
1916	14,928	284		https://paperspast.natlib.govt.nz/parliamentary/appendix-to-the-journals-of-the-house-of-representatives/1916/I/1053	RETURN No. 12. Statement of Revenue for each Station for the Year ended 31 March 1916
1917	14,220	250		https://paperspast.natlib.govt.nz/parliamentary/appendix-to-the-journals-of-the-house-of-representatives/1917/I/1123	RETURN No. 12. Statement of Revenue for each Station for the Year ended 31 March 1917
1918	14,662	238		https://paperspast.natlib.govt.nz/parliamentary/appendix-to-the-journals-of-the-house-of-representatives/1918/I-II/1159	RETURN No. 12. Statement of Revenue for each Station for the Year ended 31 March 1918
1919	14,119	278		https://paperspast.natlib.govt.nz/parliamentary/appendix-to-the-journals-of-the-house-of-representatives/1919/I/1231	RETURN No. 12. Statement of Revenue for each Station for the Year ended 31 March 1919
1920	15,239	301		https://paperspast.natlib.govt.nz/parliamentary/appendix-to-the-journals-of-the-house-of-representatives/1920/I/1349	RETURN No. 12. Statement of Revenue for each Station for the Year ended 31 March 1920
1921	16,159	478		https://paperspast.natlib.govt.nz/parliamentary/appendix-to-the-journals-of-the-house-of-representatives/1921/I-II/1452	RETURN No. 12. Statement of Revenue for each Station for the Year ended 31 March 1921
1922	15,077	497		https://paperspast.natlib.govt.nz/parliamentary/appendix-to-the-journals-of-the-house-of-representatives/1922/I/1409	RETURN No. 12. Statement of Revenue for each Station for the Year ended 31 March 1922
1923	15,875	462		https://paperspast.natlib.govt.nz/parliamentary/appendix-to-the-journals-of-the-house-of-representatives/1923/I-II/1321	RETURN No. 12. Statement of Revenue for each Station for the Year ended 31 March 1923
1924	16,320	428		https://paperspast.natlib.govt.nz/parliamentary/appendix-to-the-journals-of-the-house-of-representatives/1924/I/2458	RETURN No. 12. Statement of Revenue for each Station for the Year ended 31 March 1924
1925	16,773	519		https://paperspast.natlib.govt.nz/parliamentary/appendix-to-the-journals-of-the-house-of-representatives/1925/I/1804	RETURN No. 12. Statement of Traffic and Revenue for each Station for the Year ended 31 March 1925
1926	17,186	656		https://paperspast.natlib.govt.nz/parliamentary/appendix-to-the-journals-of-the-house-of-representatives/1926/I/1930	STATEMENT No. 18 Statement of Traffic and Revenue for each Station for the Year ended 31 March 1926
1927	15,693	522		https://paperspast.natlib.govt.nz/parliamentary/appendix-to-the-journals-of-the-house-of-representatives/1927/I/2230	STATEMENT No. 18 Statement of Traffic and Revenue for each Station for the Year ended 31 March 1927
1928	14,701	330		https://paperspast.natlib.govt.nz/parliamentary/appendix-to-the-journals-of-the-house-of-representatives/1928/I/2628	STATEMENT No. 18 Statement of Traffic and Revenue for each Station for the Year ended 31 March 1928
1929	11,127	375		https://paperspast.natlib.govt.nz/parliamentary/appendix-to-the-journals-of-the-house-of-representatives/1929/I/2090	STATEMENT No. 18 Statement of Traffic and Revenue for each Station for the Year ended 31 March 1929
1930	9,489	252		https://paperspast.natlib.govt.nz/parliamentary/appendix-to-the-journals-of-the-house-of-representatives/1930/I/2212	STATEMENT No. 18 Statement of Traffic and Revenue for each Station for the Year ended 31 March 1930
1931	12,935	298		https://paperspast.natlib.govt.nz/parliamentary/appendix-to-the-journals-of-the-house-of-representatives/1931/I-II/1778	STATEMENT No. 18 Statement of Traffic and Revenue for each Station for the Year ended 31 March 1931
1932	12,341	343		https://paperspast.natlib.govt.nz/parliamentary/appendix-to-the-journals-of-the-house-of-representatives/1932/I-II/1934	STATEMENT No. 18 Statement of Traffic and Revenue for each Station for the Year ended 31 March 1932
1933	19,032	280		https://paperspast.natlib.govt.nz/parliamentary/appendix-to-the-journals-of-the-house-of-representatives/1933/I/1388	STATEMENT No. 18 Statement of Traffic and Revenue for each Station for the Year ended 31 March 1933
1934	20,857	339		https://paperspast.natlib.govt.nz/parliamentary/appendix-to-the-journals-of-the-house-of-representatives/1934/I/2278	STATEMENT No. 18 Statement of Traffic and Revenue for each Station for the Year ended 31 March 1934
1935	21,597	313		https://paperspast.natlib.govt.nz/parliamentary/appendix-to-the-journals-of-the-house-of-representatives/1935/I/1326	STATEMENT No. 18 Statement of Traffic and Revenue for each Station for the Year ended 31 March 1935
1936	21,743	313		https://paperspast.natlib.govt.nz/parliamentary/appendix-to-the-journals-of-the-house-of-representatives/1936/I/1552	STATEMENT No. 18 Statement of Traffic and Revenue for each Station for the Year ended 31 March 1936
1937	24,107	495		https://paperspast.natlib.govt.nz/parliamentary/appendix-to-the-journals-of-the-house-of-representatives/1937/I/1896	STATEMENT No. 18 Statement of Traffic and Revenue for each Station for the Year ended 31 March 1937
1938	24,894	356		https://paperspast.natlib.govt.nz/parliamentary/appendix-to-the-journals-of-the-house-of-representatives/1938/I/1652	STATEMENT No. 18 Statement of Traffic and Revenue for each Station for the Year ended 31 March 1938
1939	23,363	405		https://paperspast.natlib.govt.nz/parliamentary/appendix-to-the-journals-of-the-house-of-representatives/1939/I/1970	STATEMENT No. 18 Statement of Traffic and Revenue for each Station for the Year ended 31 March 1939
1940	22,551	332		https://paperspast.natlib.govt.nz/parliamentary/appendix-to-the-journals-of-the-house-of-representatives/1940/I/1314	STATEMENT No. 18 Statement of Traffic and Revenue for each Station for the Year ended 31 March 1940
1941	24,813	280		https://paperspast.natlib.govt.nz/parliamentary/appendix-to-the-journals-of-the-house-of-representatives/1941/I/1203	STATEMENT No. 18 Statement of Traffic and Revenue for each Station for the Year ended 31 March 1941
1942	27,872	322		https://paperspast.natlib.govt.nz/parliamentary/appendix-to-the-journals-of-the-house-of-representatives/1942/I/651	STATEMENT No. 18 Statement of Traffic and Revenue for each Station for the Year ended 31 March 1942
1943	35,803	389		https://paperspast.natlib.govt.nz/parliamentary/appendix-to-the-journals-of-the-house-of-representatives/1943/I/679	STATEMENT No. 18 Statement of Traffic and Revenue for each Station for the Year ended 31 March 1943
1944	36,655	473		https://paperspast.natlib.govt.nz/parliamentary/appendix-to-the-journals-of-the-house-of-representatives/1944/I/895	STATEMENT No. 18 Statement of Traffic and Revenue for each Station for the Year ended 31 March 1944
1945	27,037	264		https://paperspast.natlib.govt.nz/parliamentary/appendix-to-the-journals-of-the-house-of-representatives/1945/I/969	STATEMENT No. 18 Statement of Traffic and Revenue for each Station for the Year ended 31 March 1945
1946	33,910	216		https://paperspast.natlib.govt.nz/parliamentary/appendix-to-the-journals-of-the-house-of-representatives/1946/I/1548	STATEMENT No. 18 Statement of Traffic and Revenue for each Station for the Year ended 31 March 1946
1947	24,333	154		https://paperspast.natlib.govt.nz/parliamentary/appendix-to-the-journals-of-the-house-of-representatives/1947/I/2495	STATEMENT No. 18 Statement of Traffic and Revenue for each Station for the Year ended 31 March 1947
1948	22,730	258		https://paperspast.natlib.govt.nz/parliamentary/appendix-to-the-journals-of-the-house-of-representatives/1948/I/2521	STATEMENT No. 18 Statement of Traffic and Revenue for each Station for the Year ended 31 March 1948
1949	22,023	291		https://paperspast.natlib.govt.nz/parliamentary/appendix-to-the-journals-of-the-house-of-representatives/1949/I/2104	STATEMENT No. 18 Statement of Traffic and Revenue for each Station for the Year ended 31 March 1949
1950	22,244	214		https://paperspast.natlib.govt.nz/parliamentary/appendix-to-the-journals-of-the-house-of-representatives/1950/I/2366	STATEMENT No. 18 Statement of Traffic and Revenue for each Station for the Year ended 31 March 1950

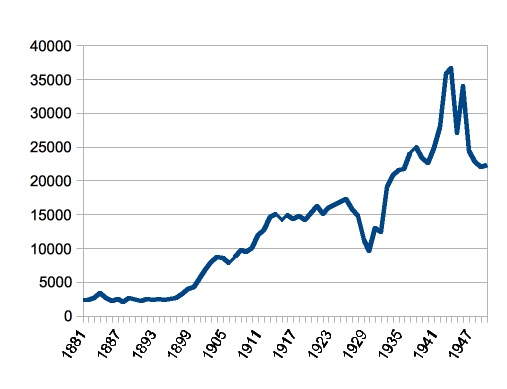
tickets sales 1881–1950 – derived from annual returns to Parliament of "Statement of Revenue for each Station for the Year ended"
