= Pokeno railway station =

Defunct railway station in New Zealand

Pokeno
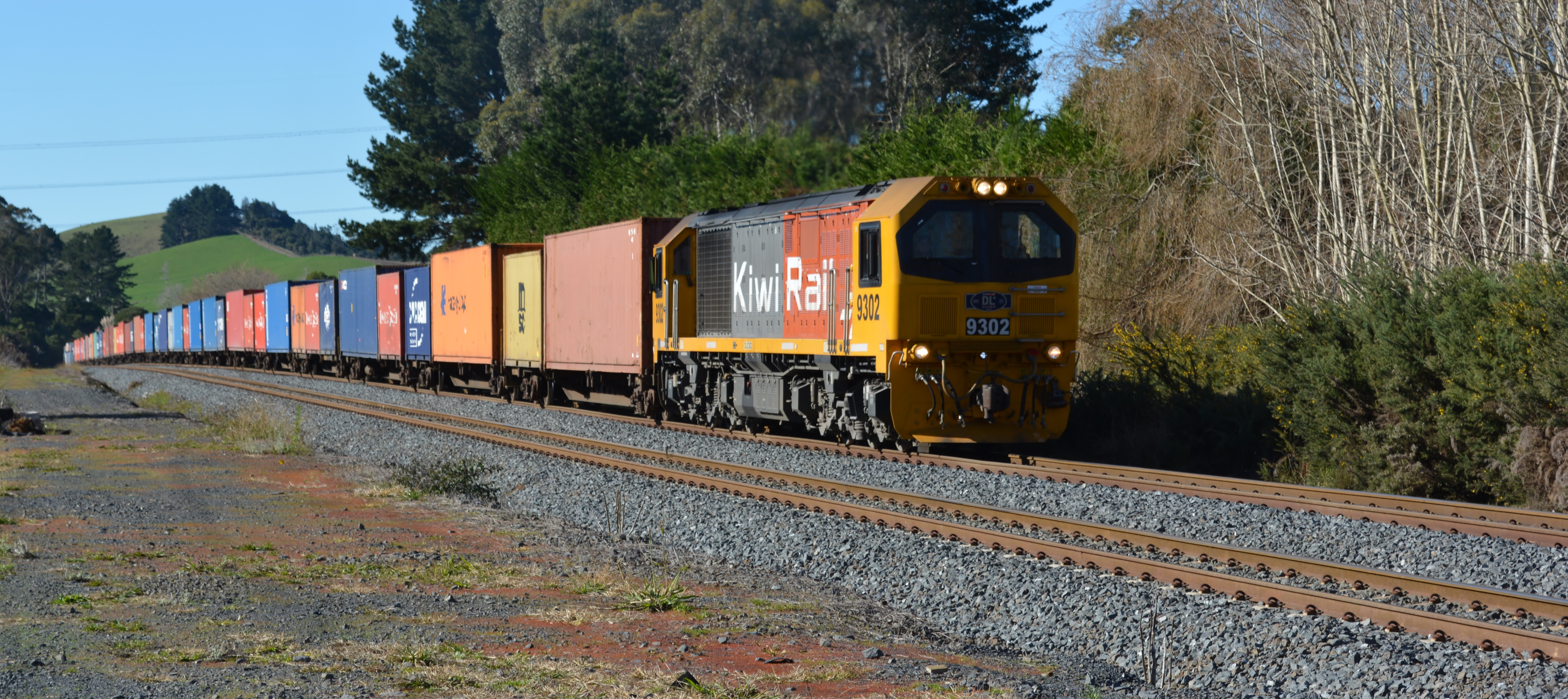
- DL9302 pulling goods train between Pōkeno and Tuakau

General information
- Location: Marlborough Street, Pōkeno, New Zealand
- Coordinates: 37.247548°S 175.020704°E
- Line: North Island Main Trunk
- Platforms: 2
- Tracks: doubled from 11 November 1951

History
- Opened: 20 May 1875
- Closed: passengers 24 June 1973 goods 30 March 1980

Services
Preceding station	Historical railways	Following station
Whangarata; Line open, station closed 4.28 km (2.66 mi)	North Island Main Trunk; KiwiRail	Mercer; Line open, station closed 2 mi 68 ch (4.6 km)
Location

Pokeno railway station is a former railway station in Pōkeno, New Zealand on the North Island Main Trunk line. It opened for passengers on 20 May 1875, and for goods on 6 April 1879. It was 39 mi 36 ch (63.5 km) south of Auckland (via Newmarket) and 41 mi 52 ch (67.0 km) (via Ōrākei).

The station closed to passengers on 24 June 1973, and to goods on 30 March 1980.

Work on the proposed Paeroa–Pōkeno Line commenced in 1938, and whilst approximately 13 km of earthworks were completed at each end, the proposal was halted due to the Second World War. Work was still making slow progress in 1950. The line was to be the first part of the East Coast Main Trunk Railway.

== History ==
A 4th class stationmasters house and 5th class Class B station were built in 1878. From 1 December 1879 to 31 October 1924 there was a Post Office at the station. By 1884 there was also a platform, cart approach, 40 ft (12 m) by 30 ft (9.1 m) goods shed, loading bank, cattle yards, urinals and a 21 wagon passing loop. In 1914 the goods shed was moved to the other side of the line and in 1939 Marlborough Street level crossing was closed and the station yard was altered. About 1969 $2,600 was spent on half-arm barriers and alarms at the Cameron Street crossing. In 1974 a hand crane was donated to the Museum of Transport & Technology, which also took kauri planks from the closed station at about the same time. After closure in 1980, the goods shed was used as a workshop and storage area for a railway bridge gang, until vandalism and burglary brought about its demolition in 1981. Traffic grew as shown in the graph and table below.

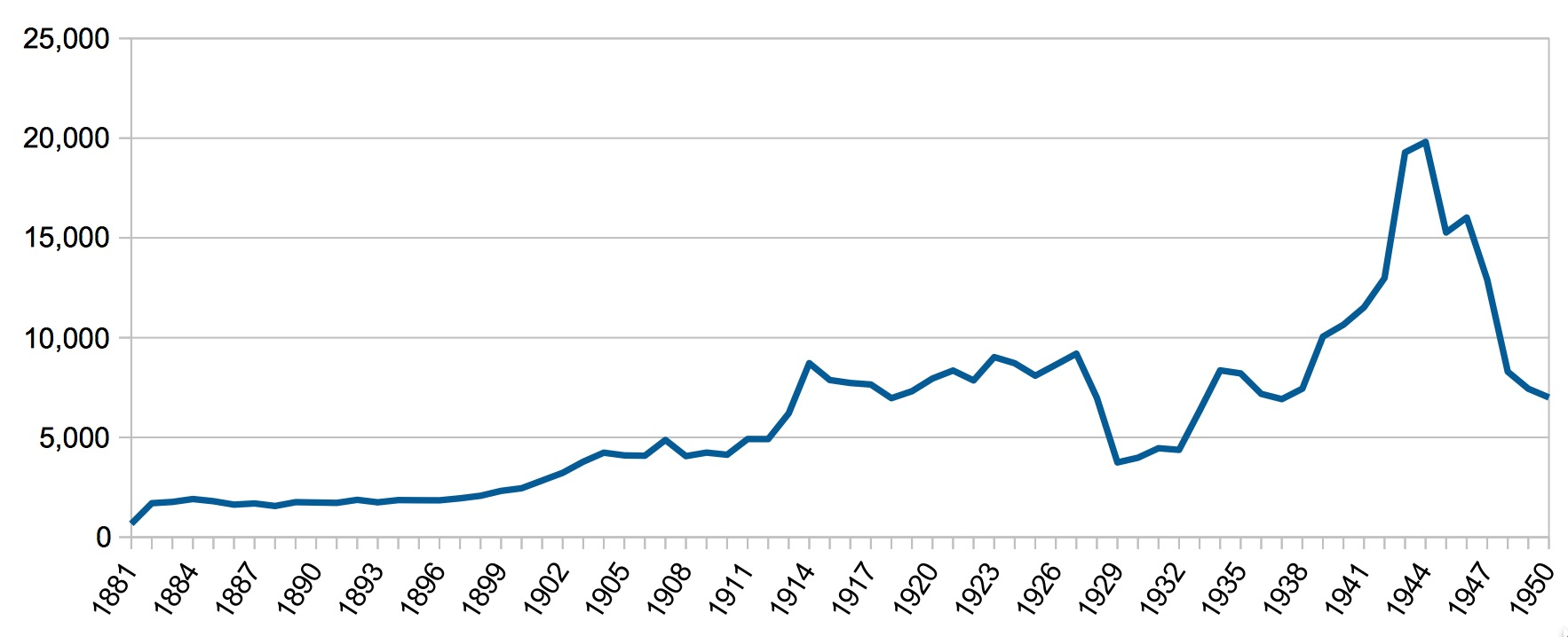
tickets sales 1881–1950 – derived from annual returns to Parliament of "Statement of Revenue for each Station for the Year ended"

year	tickets	season tickets	staff	ref.
1881	668		1	
1882	1,700		1	
1883	1,766		1	
1884	1,908		1	
1885	1,802	1	1	
1886	1,629	4	1	
1887	1,687	3	1	
1888	1,560	1	1	
1889	1,753	2	1	
1890				
1891	1,717	2	1	
1892	1,870	1	1	
1893	1,743	2	1	
1894	1,855	1	1	
1895	1,848	1	1	
1896	1,846		1	
1897	1,945	2	1	
1898	2,074	3	1	
1899	2,317	2	1	
1900	2,449	2	1	
1901				
1902	3,223	50	1	
1903	3,781	33	1	
1904	4,234	26	1	
1905	4,096	33	1	
1906	4,079	21	2	
1907	4,868	36	2	
1908	4,059	40	3	
1909	4,238	16	3	
1910	4,129	20	3	
1911	4,918	28	3	
1912	4,912	21	3	
1913	6,204	29	4	
1914	8,718	129		
1915	7,873	120		
1916	7,727	117		
1917	7,651	48		
1918	6,965	52		
1919	7,315	76		
1920	7,951	96		
1921	8,352	92		
1922	7,853	113		
1923	9,025	193		
1924	8,714	167		
1925	8,091	104		
1926	8,640	97		
1927	9,195	136		
1928	6,979	99		
1929	3,742	104		
1930	3,980	126		
1931	4,456	117		
1932	4,371	93		
1933	6,337	87		
1934	8,361	75		
1935	8,207	71		
1936	7,180	74		
1937	6,919	91		
1938	7,440	59		
1939	10,052	58		
1940	10,649	98		
1941	11,521	104		
1942	12,987	184		
1943	19,285	183		
1944	19,810	186		
1945	15,269	211		
1946	16,021	266		
1947	12,900	82		
1948	8,290	109		
1949	7,438	188		
1950	7,000	131		

== Proposed reopening ==
In 2020, reopening of the station was put forward as a scheme to help the region recover from the economic impacts of the COVID-19 pandemic, at an estimated cost of $10m. In 2022 it was said to be at least 10 years away and planned to be on the old station site, between High and Market Streets.

== See also ==
- Paeroa-Pokeno Line
- Paeroa railway station
- Taneatua Express
