= 2013 ITM Cup =

2013 rugby union competition in New Zealand

2013 ITM Cup season
- Countries: New Zealand
- Date: 15 August – 26 October
- Champions: Canterbury
- Runners-up: Wellington
- Promoted: Tasman
- Relegated: Bay of Plenty
- Matches played: 76
- Tries scored: 434 (average 5.7 per match)
- Top point scorer: Marty Banks (Tasman) and Hayden Parker (Otago); 170 points
- Top try scorer: Milford Keresoma (Canterbury); 8 tries

Official website
- www.provincial.rugby

The 2013 ITM Cup season was the eighth season of New Zealand's provincial rugby union competition since it turned professional in 2006. The regular season began on 15 August, when Counties Manukau hosted Wellington. It involved the top fourteen rugby unions of New Zealand. For sponsorship reasons, the competition was known as the ITM Cup and it was the fourth season under the lead sponsor. The winner of the Championship, Tasman was promoted to the Premiership, the seventh placed Premiership team, Bay of Plenty was relegated to the Championship.

== Format ==
The ITM Cup standings were sorted by a competition points system. Four points were awarded to the winning team, a draw equaled two points, whilst a loss amounted to zero points. Unions could also win their side a respectable bonus point. To receive a bonus point, they must have scored four tries or more or lose by seven or fewer points or less. Each team was placed on their total points received. If necessary of a tiebreaker, when two or more teams finish on equal points, the union who defeated the other in a head-to-head got placed higher. In case of a draw between them, the side with the biggest points deferential margin got rights to be ranked above. If they were tied on points difference, it was then decided by a highest scored try count or a coin toss. This seeding format was implemented since the beginning of the 2006 competition.

The competition included a promotion-relegation process with the winner of the Championship receiving automatic promotion to the Premiership, replacing the seventh-placed team in the Premiership which was relegated to the Championship for the following year. The regular season consisted of two types of matches. The internal division matches were when each team played the other six unions in their division once, home or away. The cross-division matches were when each team played four teams from the other division, thus missing out on three teams, each from the opposite division. Each union played home or away games against teams from the other division, making a total of ten competition games for each union. The finals format allowed the top four teams from each division move on to the semi-finals. The top two division winners, based on table points, received a home semi-final. In the first round of the finals, the semi-finals, the second division winner hosted the third division winner, and the first division winner hosted the fourth division winner. The final was hosted by the top remaining seed.

== Standings ==
Source: ITM Cup standings 2013

Premiership Division
#	Team	GP	W	D	L	PF	PA	PD	TB	LB	PTS
1	Wellington	10	9	0	1	330	178	+152	6	0	42
2	Canterbury	10	8	0	2	371	163	+208	7	1	40
3	Auckland	10	7	0	3	306	236	+70	7	1	36
4	RS – Counties Manukau	10	6	0	4	287	262	+25	3	1	28
5	Waikato	10	4	0	6	235	298	–63	2	3	21
6	Taranaki	10	3	0	7	137	242	–105	0	2	14
7	Bay of Plenty	10	1	0	9	206	298	–92	0	4	8

Championship Division
#	Team	GP	W	D	L	PF	PA	PD	TB	LB	PTS
1	Tasman	10	8	0	2	333	186	+147	4	0	36
2	Otago	10	6	0	4	304	305	–1	4	2	30
3	Hawke's Bay	10	6	0	4	272	204	+68	3	2	29
4	Southland	10	4	0	6	202	232	–30	2	2	20
5	Manawatu	10	4	0	6	189	340	–151	1	1	18
6	Northland	10	2	1	7	184	275	–91	1	2	13
7	North Harbour	10	1	1	8	193	330	–137	1	3	10

=== Standings progression ===
Premiership
Team	W1	W2	W3	W4	W5	W6	W7	W8	W9
Auckland	5 (3rd)	9 (3rd)	14 (3rd)	23 (2nd)	24 (3rd)	29 (2nd)	34 (2nd)	34 (3rd)	36 (3rd)
Bay of Plenty	1 (5th)	5 (5th)	5 (4th)	5 (6th)	5 (7th)	5 (7th)	6 (7th)	7 (7th)	8 (7th)
Canterbury	5 (2nd)	9 (2nd)	14 (2nd)	19 (3rd)	24 (2nd)	25 (3rd)	30 (3rd)	35 (2nd)	40 (2nd)
Counties Manukau	0 (7th)	5 (6th)	5 (5th)	10 (4th)	15 (4th)	20 (4th)	24 (4th)	24 (4th)	28 (4th)
Taranaki	0 (6th)	0 (7th)	4 (7th)	4 (7th)	8 (6th)	12 (5th)	13 (5th)	14 (6th)	14 (6th)
Waikato	4 (4th)	5 (4th)	5 (6th)	6 (5th)	11 (5th)	11 (6th)	12 (6th)	17 (5th)	21 (5th)
Wellington	5 (1st)	10 (1st)	20 (1st)	25 (1st)	29 (1st)	33 (1st)	37 (1st)	42 (1st)	42 (1st)
Championship
Team	W1	W2	W3	W4	W5	W6	W7	W8	W9
Hawke's Bay	5 (1st)	6 (2nd)	10 (1st)	11 (2nd)	15 (1st)	15 (2nd)	20 (2nd)	24 (2nd)	29 (3rd)
Manawatu	0 (7th)	1 (6th)	1 (7th)	5 (7th)	9 (4th)	10 (5th)	14 (5th)	18 (5th)	18 (5th)
North Harbour	1 (4th)	1 (7th)	4 (5th)	5 (6th)	9 (5th)	10 (6th)	10 (6th)	10 (6th)	10 (7th)
Northland	0 (5th)	4 (4th)	7 (4th)	7 (4th)	8 (6th)	8 (7th)	8 (7th)	9 (7th)	13 (6th)
Otago	4 (3rd)	8 (1st)	9 (3rd)	9 (3rd)	9 (3rd)	14 (4th)	16 (4th)	21 (3rd)	30 (2nd)
Southland	0 (6th)	1 (5th)	2 (6th)	6 (5th)	6 (7th)	15 (3rd)	20 (3rd)	20 (4th)	20 (4th)
Tasman	4 (2nd)	4 (3rd)	9 (2nd)	14 (1st)	14 (2nd)	18 (1st)	22 (1st)	31 (1st)	36 (1st)
The table above shows a team's progression throughout the season. For each week, their cumulative points total is shown with the overall division log position in brackets.
Key:	Win	Draw	Loss	Bye					

== Regular season ==
The 2013 ITM Cup was played across nine weeks with every team playing one Wednesday night fixture in a double-up round where they played twice that week. The competition started on Thursday, 15 August, with Counties Manukau taking on Wellington at ECOLight Stadium.

=== Week 1 ===
15 August 2013
19:35 NZST

Counties Manukau	16–55	Wellington
Try: Maama Vaipulu 47'; Con: Baden Kerr (1/1) 48'; Pen: Baden Kerr (3/3) 14', 28', 35'	Report	Try: Sinoti Sinoti 6'; Jeffery Toomaga-Allen 23'; Dane Coles 29'; Matt Proctor 40'; Tim Bateman 52'; Shaun Treeby 59'; Taniela Koroi 69'; Joe Hill 74'; Con: Lima Sopoaga (6/8) 24', 30', 40', 53', 60', 75'; Pen: Lima Sopoaga (1/1) 16'

ECOLight Stadium, Pukekohe
Referee: Nick Briant

16 August 2013
19:35 NZST

Canterbury	30–6	Taranaki
Try: Patrick Osborne 22'; Matt Todd 31'; Luke Katene 44'; Adam Whitelock 58'; Con: Tyler Bleyendaal (2/4) 23', 59'; Pen: Tyler Bleyendaal (2/2) 13', 49'	Report	Pen: Andre Taylor (2/2) 26', 40'

Rugby League Park, Christchurch
Referee: Shane McDermott

17 August 2013
14:35 NZST

Hawke's Bay	45–18	Manawatu
Try: Brendon O'Connor 12'; Gillies Kaka 15'; Telusa Veainu 22'; Zac Guildford 40'; Alby Mathewson 43'; Ihaia West 52'; Karl Lowe 70'; Con: Ihaia West (5/7) 13', 24', 41', 43', 71'	Report	Try: Lewis Marshall 48'; Bryn Templeman 66'; Con: Jade Te Rure (1/2) 49'; Pen: Jade Te Rure (2/2) 1', 5'

McLean Park, Napier
Referee: Kane McBride

17 August 2013
17:35 NZST

Southland	15–25	Tasman
Pen: Scott Eade (5/5) 9', 25', 45', 50', 63'	Report	Try: James Lowe (2) 18', 66'; Con: Andy Symons (0/1); Billy Guyton (0/1); Pen: Andy Symons (2/4) 6', 12'; Billy Guyton (3/3) 35', 57', 60'

Rugby Park Stadium, Invercargill
Referee: Richard Kelly

17 August 2013
19:35 NZST

RS – Waikato	31–22	Northland
Try: Rory Grice 15'; Joe Webber 25'; Toby Smith 74'; Con: Trent Renata (2/3) 16', 75'; Pen: Trent Renata (4/5) 12', 32', 45', 66'	Report	Try: Sonatane Takulua 42'; Con: Ben Seymour (1/1) 43'; Pen: Ben Seymour (5/5) 18', 29', 36', 50', 68'

Waikato Stadium, Hamilton
Referee: Jonathon White

18 August 2013
14:35 NZST

Auckland	27–20	North Harbour
Try: Lolagi Visinia 3'; Piri Weepu 14'; Sam Prattley 28'; Luke Braid 57'; Con: Simon Hickey (2/4) 15', 29'; Pen: Simon Hickey (1/1) 23'	Report	Try: James Parsons 37'; Raymond Niuia 78'; Con: Jon Elrick (2/2) 38', 79'; Pen: Jon Elrick (2/2) 16', 54'

Eden Park, Auckland
Referee: Sheldon Eden-Whaitiri

18 August 2013
16:35 NZST

Otago	32–29	Bay of Plenty
Try: Peter Breen 25'; TJ Ioane 58'; Con: Hayden Parker (2/2) 27', 59'; Pen: Hayden Parker (6/7) 22', 36', 43', 50', 63', 75'	Report	Try: Maritino Nemani 7'; Joe Royal 52'; Con: Willie Ripia (2/2) 7', 53'; Pen: Willie Ripia (5/5) 11', 14', 31', 33', 67'

Forsyth Barr Stadium, Dunedin
Referee: Mike Fraser

=== Week 2 ===
22 August 2013
19:35 NZST

North Harbour	14–44	Counties Manukau
Try: Adrian Smith 40'; Con: Jon Elrick (0/1); Pen: Jon Elrick (3/3) 8', 17', 43'	Report	Try: Maama Vaipulu 5'; Adam Cathcart 12'; Frank Halai (2) 30', 44'; Ahsee Tuala 80'; Con: Baden Kerr (4/4) 6', 14', 32', 45'; Ki Anufe (1/1) 80'; Pen: Baden Kerr (3/4) 24', 27', 29'

North Harbour Stadium, Albany
Referee: Richard Kelly

23 August 2013
18:05 NZST

Taranaki	10–29	Taranaki
Try: Daniel Brooks 66'; Con: Andre Taylor (1/1) 67'; Pen: Andre Taylor (1/1) 22'	Report	Try: Joe Hill 12'; Ross Filipo (2) 19', 38'; Kaipati Gaualofa 42'; Con: Lima Sopoaga (3/4) 13', 19', 43'; Pen: Lima Sopoaga (1/3) 9'

Yarrow Stadium, New Plymouth
Referee: Kane McBride

23 August 2013
20:05 NZST

Waikato	19–26	Otago – RS
Try: Tim Mikkelson 36'; Con: Trent Renata (1/1) 37'; Pen: Trent Renata (4/4) 6', 19', 50', 55'	Report	Try: Hayden Parker 24'; TJ Ioane 63'; Con: Hayden Parker (2/2) 25', 64'; Pen: Hayden Parker (4/4) 12', 15', 31', 58'

Waikato Stadium, Hamilton
Referee: Glen Jackson

24 August 2013
14:35 NZST

Tasman	13–28	Canterbury
Try: James Lowe 15'; Kaide Whiting 63'; Con: Andy Symons (0/1); Billy Guyton (0/1); Pen: Andy Symons (1/1) 12'; Billy Guyton (0/1)	Report	Try: Adam Whitelock (2) 30', 73'; Ryan Crotty 46'; Con: Tyler Bleyendaal (2/3) 46', 74'; Pen: Tyler Bleyendaal (3/4) 21', 60', 67'

Lansdowne Park, Blenheim
Referee: Sheldon Eden-Whaitiri

24 August 2013
16:35 NZST

Northland	13–9	Southland
Try: Ben Seymour 17'; Con: Ben Seymour (1/1) 18'; Pen: Ben Seymour (2/3) 39', 73'	Report	Pen: Scott Eade (3/6) 3', 21', 62'

Okara Park, Whangārei
Referee: Brendon Pickerill

25 August 2013
14:35 NZST

Bay of Plenty	24–20	Hawke's Bay
Try: Joe Tupe 47'; Willie Ripia 62'; Con: Willie Ripia (1/2) 63'; Pen: Willie Ripia (4/4) 20', 56', 65', 69'	Report	Try: Telusa Veainu 5'; Ihaia West 71'; Con: Ihaia West (2/2) 6', 73'; Pen: Ihaia West (2/4) 15', 51'; Cards: Zac Guildford (yellow card) 55'

Baypark Stadium, Tauranga
Referee: Mike Fraser

25 August 2013
16:35 NZST

Manawatu	18–21	Auckland
Try: Nic Stirzaker 10'; Tomasi Cama 25'; Con: Jade Te Rure (1/2) 25'; Pen: Jade Te Rure (2/2) 6', 48'; Cards: Tomasi Cama (yellow card) 40'	Report	Try: Patrick Tuipulotu 51'; Sean Polwart 45'; Con: Simon Hickey (1/2) 52'; Pen: Simon Hickey (3/4) 3', 36', 40'

Arena Manawatu, Palmerston North
Referee: Nick Briant

=== Week 3 ===
28 August 2013
19:35 NZST

Wellington	35–27	North Harbour
Try: TJ Perenara 2'; Lima Sopoaga 21'; Charlie Ngatai (2) 26', 58'; Con: Lima Sopoaga (3/4) 3', 22', 27'; Pen: Lima Sopoaga (3/3) 54', 64', 80'; Cards: Eric Sione (yellow card) 70'	Report	Try: Nafi Tuitavake 35'; Tevita Li 39'; Francis Saili 71'; Con: Codey Rei (3/3) 36', 40', 72'; Pen: Codey Rei (2/2) 51', 68'

Wellington Regional Stadium, Wellington
Referee: Richard Kelly

29 August 2013
19:35 NZST

Canterbury	47–10	Waikato
Try: Milford Keresoma (2) 14', 23'; Ben Funnell 31'; Adam Whitelock 61'; George Whitelock 72'; Colin Slade 75'; Patrick Osborne 79'; Con: Tyler Bleyendaal (1/4) 62'; Colin Slade (2/3) 73', 80'; Pen: Tyler Bleyendaal (2/2) 6', 19'	Report	Try: Brayden Mitchell 42'; Con: Wharenui Hawera (1/1) 43'; Pen: Wharenui Hawera (1/1) 28'

Rugby League Park, Christchurch
Referee: Glen Jackson

30 August 2013
19:35 NZST

Counties Manukau	20–40	Tasman
Try: Augustine Pulu 19'; Bundee Aki 26'; Con: Ahsee Tuala (2/2) 20', 27'; Pen: Ahsee Tuala (1/1) 37'; Ki Anufe (1/1) 58'	Report	Try: Liam Squire 34'; Shane Christie 55'; Kieron Fonotia 65'; Tom Marshall 76'; Con: Marty Banks (4/4) 35', 56', 66', 77'; Pen: Marty Banks (4/6) 13', 23', 40', 62'

ECOLight Stadium, Pukekohe
Referee: Grant Stuart

31 August 2013
14:35 NZST

Auckland	32–17	Bay of Plenty
Try: Malakai Fekitoa 28'; Luke Braid 40'; George Moala 69'; Hadleigh Parkes 79'; Con: Simon Hickey (3/4) 29', 41', 80'; Pen: Simon Hickey (2/3) 17', 77'	Report	Try: Kimami Sitauti 53'; Con: Willie Ripia (0/1); Pen: Willie Ripia (4/5) 25', 62', 67', 73'

Eden Park, Auckland
Referee: Ben O'Keeffe

31 August 2013
17:35 NZST

North Harbour	33–33	Northland
Try: Jordan Manihera 16'; Greg Pleasants-Tate 43'; James Parsons 48'; Nafi Tuitavake 76'; Con: Codey Rei (1/3) 49'; Jon Elrick (1/1) 77'; Pen: Codey Rei (1/2) 2'; Jon Elrick (2/2) 68', 70'; Cards: Zak Judge (red card) 65'	Report	Try: Rupeni Caucaunibuca (2) 20', 34'; Whiria Meltzer 23'; Dan Pryor 54'; Con: Ben Seymour (2/4) 25', 55'; Pen: Ben Seymour (3/5) 6', 47', 73'; Cards: Rene Ranger (yellow card) 67'

North Harbour Stadium, Albany
Referee: Chris Pollock

31 August 2013
19:35 NZST

Southland	14–15	Taranaki
Try: Tim Cornforth 45'; Con: Scott Eade (0/1); Pen: Scott Eade (2/4) 30', 42'; Marty McKenzie (1/2) 60'	Report	Try: Jackson Ormond 34'; Isaia Tuifua 43'; Con: Andre Taylor (1/2) 44'; Pen: Andre Taylor (1/3) 27'

Rugby Park Stadium, Invercargill
Referee: Shane McDermott

1 September 2013
14:35 NZST

Wellington	42–15	Manawatu
Try: Joe Hill 26'; Ross Filipo (2) 38', 72'; Tim Bateman 74'; Afa Fa'atau 77'; Con: Lima Sopoaga (4/5) 39', 73', 75', 78'; Pen: Lima Sopoaga (3/5) 59', 67', 70'	Report	Try: Nic Stirzaker (2) 15', 29'; Con: Nathan George (1/2) 30'; Pen: Nathan George (1/1) 2'; Jade Te Rure (0/1)

Wellington Regional Stadium, Wellington
Referee: Matt O'Brien (Australia)

1 September 2013
16:35 NZST

Otago	19–20	Hawke's Bay – RS
Try: Jayden Spence 61'; Buxton Popoali'i 73'; Con: Hayden Parker (0/2); Pen: Hayden Parker (3/4) 13', 16', 36'	Report	Try: Telusa Veainu 32'; Ihaia West 57'; Con: Ihaia West (2/2) 33', 58'; Pen: Ihaia West (2/3) 31', 38'

Forsyth Barr Stadium, Dunedin
Referee: Mike Fraser

=== Week 4 ===
4 September 2013
19:35 NZST

Auckland	22–20	Counties Manukau
Try: Tom McCartney 74'; Con: Simon Hickey (1/1) 75'; Pen: Simon Hickey (5/6) 17', 37', 42', 52', 56'	Report	Try: Frank Halai 40'; Rey Lee-Lo 66'; Con: Ki Anufe (1/1) 40'; Ahsee Tuala (1/1) 67'; Pen: Ki Anufe (2/5) 18', 25'; Cards: Sherwin Stowers (yellow card) 41'

Eden Park, Auckland
Referee: Glen Jackson

5 September 2013
19:35 NZST

Bay of Plenty	18–48	Canterbury
Try: Kendrick Lynn 55'; Carl Axtens 66'; Con: Willie Ripia (1/2) 56'; Pen: Willie Ripia (2/3) 4', 26'	Report	Try: Milford Keresoma (2) 36', 62'; Ryan Crotty 37'; George Whitelock (2) 46', 72'; Rob Thompson 80'; Con: Tyler Bleyendaal (5/5) 36', 39', 47', 64', 74'; Richie Mo'unga (1/1) 80'; Pen: Tyler Bleyendaal (2/2) 11', 20'; Cards: Jordan Taufua (yellow card) 29'

Rotorua International Stadium, Rotorua
Referee: Richard Kelly

6 September 2013
18:05 NZST

Southland	20–16	Waikato
Try: Cardiff Vaega 32'; Josh Bekhuis 47'; Con: Marty McKenzie (1/1) 33'; Scott Eade (1/1) 47'; Pen: Marty McKenzie (1/2) 37'; Scott Eade (1/1) 73'; Cards: Tayler Adams (yellow card) 68'	Report	Try: Semisi Masirewa 69'; Con: Trent Renata (1/1) 70'; Pen: Trent Renata (3/3) 9', 14', 21'

Rugby Park Stadium, Invercargill
Referee: Matt O'Brien (Australia)

6 September 2013
20:05 NZST

Tasman	49–16	Otago
Try: Liam Squire 29'; Shane Christie 36'; Tevita Koloamatangi 48'; James Lowe (2) 55', 61'; Mitchell Scott 69'; Con: Marty Banks (5/6) 31', 37', 49', 56', 70'; Pen: Marty Banks (3/4) 16', 34', 51'	Report	Try: Craig Millar 12'; Con: Hayden Parker (1/1) 13'; Pen: Hayden Parker (3/3) 22', 39', 44'; Cards: Kieran Moffat (yellow card) 33'; Liam Coltman (yellow card) 59'

Trafalgar Park, Nelson
Referee: Akihisa Aso (Japan)

7 September 2013
14:35 NZST

Taranaki	15–51	Auckland
Try: James Broadhurst 16'; Rhys Marshall 43'; Con: Daniel Brooks (1/2) 17'; Pen: Daniel Brooks (1/1) 6'	Report	Try: Hadleigh Parkes 1'; Lolagi Visinia (2) 28', 62'; Vince Aso 32'; Malakai Fekitoa 48'; Saleaula Silipa 66'; Con: Simon Hickey (4/4) 1', 29', 33', 49'; Piri Weepu (2/2) 64', 67'; Pen: Simon Hickey (1/1) 53'; Piri Weepu (1/2) 56'; Orene Ai'i (1/1) 77'

Yarrow Stadium, New Plymouth
Referee: Chris Pollock

7 September 2013
16:35 NZST

Hawke's Bay	24–27	Counties Manukau – RS
Try: Gillies Kaka 15'; Mark Atkins 52'; Con: Ihaia West (1/2) 16'; Pen: Ihaia West (4/5) 26', 30', 36', 68'	Report	Try: Sherwin Stowers 11'; Sean Reidy 69'; Sikeli Nabou 74'; Con: Baden Kerr (0/1); Ahsee Tuala (0/2); Pen: Baden Kerr (4/4) 6', 21', 32', 43'

McLean Park, Napier
Referee: Jonathon White

8 September 2013
14:35 NZST

Manawatu	15–12	North Harbour
Try: James Oliver 9'; Nehe Milner-Skudder 41'; Rob Foreman 56'; Con: Jade Te Rure (0/3)	Report	Try: Nafi Tuitavake 29'; Michael Little 73'; Con: Jon Elrick (1/1) 30'; Codey Rei (0/1); Pen: Jon Elrick (0/2)

Arena Manawatu, Palmerston North
Referee: Grant Stuart

8 September 2013
16:35 NZST

Northland	10–30	Wellington
Try: Tom Murday 24'; Con: Ben Seymour (1/1) 24'; Pen: Ben Seymour (1/1) 10'	Report	Try: Motu Matu'u 2'; Ross Filipo 13'; Ardie Savea 29'; Ambrose Curtis 53'; Tim Bateman 66'; Con: Lima Sopoaga (1/5) 67'; Pen: Lima Sopoaga (1/2) 63'

Okara Park, Whangārei
Referee: Brendon Pickerill

=== Week 5 ===
11 September 2013
19:35 NZST

Taranaki	23–10	Hawke's Bay
Try: Jamison Gibson-Park 36'; Ope Peleseuma 70'; Con: Andre Taylor (2/2) 37', 71'; Pen: Andre Taylor (3/4) 13', 40', 55'; Cards: Ryan Cocker (yellow card) 38'	Report	Try: Mark Atkins 78'; Con: Régis Lespinas (1/1) 79'; Pen: Régis Lespinas (1/1) 15'

Yarrow Stadium, New Plymouth
Referee: Akihisa Aso (Japan)

12 September 2013
19:35 NZST

Wellington	33–16	Bay of Plenty
Try: Jeffery Toomaga-Allen 8'; Tim Bateman 24'; Shaun Treeby 67'; Con: Lima Sopoaga (3/3) 9', 25', 68'; Pen: Lima Sopoaga (4/5) 4', 28', 49', 58'	Report	Try: Dave Thomas 43'; Con: Willie Ripia (1/1) 44'; Pen: Willie Ripia (3/4) 16', 40', 53'

Wellington Regional Stadium, Wellington
Referee: Michael Lash

13 September 2013
18:05 NZST

Manawatu	27–17	Southland
Try: Jason Emery 15'; Papa Wharewera 31'; Fraser Stone 45'; Con: Jade Te Rure (3/3) 16', 33', 46'; Pen: Jade Te Rure (2/3) 6', 65'	Report	Try: John Hardie 8'; Tim Boys 55'; Con: Marty McKenzie (1/1) 9'; Scott Eade (1/1) 55'; Pen: Marty McKenzie (1/1) 41'

Arena Manawatu, Palmerston North
Referee: Francisco Pastrana (Argentina)

13 September 2013
20:05 NZST

North Harbour	23–12	Tasman
Try: Ben Afeaki 48'; Francis Saili 74'; Con: Jon Elrick (2/2) 49', 75'; Pen: Jon Elrick (3/3) 14', 40', 58'	Report	Pen: Marty Banks (4/4) 8', 11', 19', 32'

North Harbour Stadium, Albany
Referee: Ben O'Keeffe

14 September 2013
14:35 NZST

Waikato	42–24	Auckland
Try: Rory Grice 5'; Brad Weber (2) 12', 58'; Wharenui Hawera 22'; Semisi Masirewa 31'; Trent Renata 65'; Con: Trent Renata (6/6) 6', 14', 24', 32', 59', 67'; Cards: Rory Grice (yellow card) 68'	Report	Try: Hadleigh Parkes 20'; Patrick Tuipulotu 29'; Vince Aso 54'; Liaki Moli 61'; Con: Piri Weepu (2/4) 30', 62'; Pen: Piri Weepu (0/2)

Waikato Stadium, Hamilton
Referee: Chris Pollock

14 September 2013
16:35 NZST

Canterbury	32–22	Otago
Try: Adam Whitelock 5'; Tom Taylor 36'; Corey Flynn 50'; Paea Faʻanunu 71'; Con: Tom Taylor (3/4) 7', 51', 72'; Pen: Tom Taylor (2/2) 32', 80'	Report	Try: Fa'asiu Fuatai 8'; Con: Hayden Parker (1/1) 10'; Pen: Hayden Parker (5/5) 24', 27', 60', 64', 76'

Rugby League Park, Christchurch
Referee: Shane McDermott

15 September 2013
14:35 NZST

RS – Counties Manukau	44–7	Taranaki
Try: Hika Elliot 3'; Jimmy Tupou 8'; Frank Halai (2) 25', 42'; Kane Hancy 73'; Rey Lee-Lo 74'; Con: Baden Kerr (3/4) 5', 27', 43'; Ahsee Tuala (1/2) 75'; Pen: Baden Kerr (2/3) 12', 29'	Report	Try: Carl Carmichael 48'; Con: Beaudein Waaka (1/1) 49'

ECOLight Stadium, Pukekohe
Referee: Nick Briant

15 September 2013
16:35 NZST

Hawke's Bay	31–26	Northland
Try: Zac Guildford 55'; Penikolo Latu 72'; Richard Buckman 75'; Con: Ihaia West (2/3) 56', 73'; Pen: Ihaia West (4/5) 8', 31', 45', 49'	Report	Try: Jake Paringatai 5'; Roy Griffin 33'; Con: Daniel Hawkins (2/2) 6', 34'; Pen: Daniel Hawkins (3/3) 27', 39', 66'; Drop: Daniel Hawkins 37'; Cards: Daniel Hawkins (yellow card) 69'

McLean Park, Napier
Referee: Kane McBride

=== Week 6 ===
18 September 2013
19:35 NZST

Bay of Plenty	25–33	Southland
Try: Kimami Sitauti 40'; Con: Willie Ripia (1/1) 40'; Pen: Willie Ripia (6/7) 4', 19', 35', 38', 46', 58'	Report	Try: Talemaitoga Tuapati 28'; Elliot Dixon 65'; Marty McKenzie 67'; Con: Scott Eade (3/3) 28', 66', 67'; Pen: Scott Eade (4/4) 22', 31', 69', 74'

Baypark Stadium, Tauranga
Referee: Grant Stuart

19 September 2013
19:35 NZST

Auckland	41–10	Northland
Try: Hadleigh Parkes 12'; Vince Aso 31'; George Moala 48'; Simon Hickey 61'; Lolagi Visinia 72'; Ofa Tu'ungafasi 75'; Con: Piri Weepu (4/5) 13', 32', 49', 62'; Lolagi Visinia (0/1); Pen: Piri Weepu (1/2) 51'	Report	Try: Mathew Wright 40'; Con: Daniel Hawkins (1/1) 40'; Pen: Daniel Hawkins (1/2) 56'

Eden Park, Auckland
Referee: Shane McDermott

20 September 2013
19:35 NZST

Otago	52–41	Manawatu
Try: Gareth Evans 1'; Jayden Spence (2) 17', 36'; Peter Breen 24'; Buxton Popoali'i 30'; TJ Ioane 70'; Con: Hayden Parker (5/6) 2', 18', 25', 31', 71'; Pen: Hayden Parker (4/4) 14', 49', 60', 67'	Report	Try: Callum Gibbins 3'; Papa Wharewera 10'; Niko Malo 32'; Tevita Taufuʻi 43'; Leroy Van Dam 54'; Con: Jade Te Rure (5/5) 4', 11', 33', 44', 55'; Pen: Jade Te Rure (2/3) 21', 40'

Forsyth Barr Stadium, Dunedin
Referee: Glen Jackson

21 September 2013
14:35 NZST

RS – Counties Manukau	37–25	Waikato
Try: Sherwin Stowers 10'; Augustine Pulu 31'; Fritz Lee 47'; Toni Pulu 58'; Con: Baden Kerr (4/4) 11', 32', 48', 59'; Pen: Baden Kerr (3/5) 23', 39', 52'; Cards: Augustine Pulu (yellow card) 75'	Report	Try: Trent Renata 5'; Rory Grice 49'; Sam Christie 55'; Con: Trent Renata (2/3) 50', 56'; Pen: Trent Renata (2/2) 14', 35'; Cards: Paul Alo-Emile (yellow card) 61'

ECOLight Stadium, Pukekohe
Referee: Chris Pollock

21 September 2013
17:35 NZST

Wellington	25–19	Canterbury
Try: Joe Hill 12'; Ardie Savea 33'; Tomasi Palu 48'; Con: Lima Sopoaga (2/2) 34', 49'; Charlie Ngatai (0/1); Pen: Lima Sopoaga (2/4) 3', 58'; Cards: Ardie Savea (yellow card) 45'; Adam Hill (red card) 72'	Report	Try: Joe Moody 40'; Con: Tyler Bleyendaal (1/1) 40'; Pen: Tyler Bleyendaal (4/6) 18', 21', 28', 46'

Wellington Regional Stadium, Wellington
Referee: Nick Briant

21 September 2013
19:35 NZST

Taranaki	21–3	Bay of Plenty
Try: Blade Thomson 33'; Kurt Baker 50'; Con: Andre Taylor (1/2) 51'; Pen: Andre Taylor (3/5) 8', 26', 31'	Report	Pen: Willie Ripia (1/2) 3'

Yarrow Stadium, New Plymouth
Referee: Jonathon White

22 September 2013
14:35 NZST

Tasman	18–9	Hawke's Bay
Try: Shane Christie 37'; Liam Squire 65'; Con: Billy Guyton (1/1) 66'; Tom Marshall (0/1); Pen: Tom Marshall (1/2) 41'; Billy Guyton (1/1) 69'; Cards: Alex Ainley (yellow card) 25'	Report	Pen: Ihaia West (3/5) 10', 26', 52'; Cards: Chris Eaton (yellow card) 25'

Trafalgar Park, Nelson
Referee: Ben O'Keeffe

22 September 2013
16:35 NZST

Southland	34–31	North Harbour
Try: Cardiff Vaega 34'; Marty McKenzie (2) 40', 50'; Hale T-Pole 59'; Tim Boys 74'; Con: Scott Eade (1/3) 41'; Marty McKenzie (2/2) 60', 75'; Drop: Marty McKenzie 80'	Report	Try: Jordan Manihera 8'; Bryn Hall 54'; Pita Ahki 64'; Con: Jon Elrick (2/3) 9', 65'; Pen: Jon Elrick (4/5) 3', 17', 37', 63'

Rugby Park Stadium, Invercargill
Referee: Mike Fraser

=== Week 7 ===
25 September 2013
19:35 NZST

Canterbury	72–7	Manawatu
Try: Andy Ellis 8'; Richie Mo'unga 14'; Sione Faletau 24'; Johnny McNicholl 35'; Ryan Crotty 40'; Milford Keresoma (4) 52', 69', 75', 79'; Paea Faʻanunu 58'; Con: Richie Mo'unga (8/10) 15', 25', 36', 40', 53', 70', 76', 80'; Pen: Richie Mo'unga (2/2) 7', 23'; Cards: Sione Faletau (yellow card) 62'	Report	Try: Chris Eves 37'; Con: Nathan George (1/1) 38'; Cards: Antonio Kiri Kiri (yellow card) 74'

Rugby League Park, Christchurch
Referee: Chris Pollock

26 September 2013
19:35 NZST

Northland	13–28	Tasman
Try: Mathew Wright 32'; Con: Daniel Hawkins (1/1) 33'; Pen: Daniel Hawkins (2/2) 10', 58'	Report	Try: Marty Banks 80'; Con: Marty Banks (1/1) 80'; Pen: Marty Banks (7/9) 6', 20', 35', 38', 45', 56', 60'

Okara Park, Whangārei
Referee: Mike Fraser

27 September 2013
19:35 NZST

Waikato	14–19	Wellington
Try: Ben Tameifuna 37'; Con: Trent Renata (0/1); Pen: Trent Renata (3/6) 6', 43', 67'	Report	Try: Afa Fa'atau 11'; Joe Hill 28'; Ardie Savea 49'; Con: Lima Sopoaga (2/3) 12', 29'; Pen: Lima Sopoaga (0/1); Cards: Ardie Savea (yellow card) 74'

Waikato Stadium, Hamilton
Referee: Glen Jackson

28 September 2013
14:35 NZST

Otago	32–38	Southland
Try: Buxton Popoali'i (2) 14', 64'; Hayden Parker 37'; Kieran Moffat 49'; Con: Hayden Parker (3/4) 15', 38', 50'; Pen: Hayden Parker (2/3) 3', 28'	Report	Try: Willis Halaholo 20'; Cardiff Vaega 41'; Elliot Dixon 58'; Scott Eade 68'; Tayler Adams 72'; Con: Marty McKenzie (0/1); Scott Eade (2/4) 42', 73'; Pen: Marty McKenzie (1/2) 11'; Scott Eade (2/2) 26', 46'

Forsyth Barr Stadium, Dunedin
Referee: Kane McBride

28 September 2013
18:05 NZST

Manawatu	12–6	Taranaki
Pen: Jade Te Rure (4/7) 11', 21', 60', 71'	Report	Pen: Andre Taylor (2/3) 19', 55'

Arena Manawatu, Palmerston North
Referee: Jonathon White

28 September 2013
19:35 NZST

Auckland	39–19	Canterbury
Try: Simon Hickey 9'; Lolagi Visinia 14'; Tenina Sauileoge 21'; Kara Pryor 35'; George Moala 59'; Con: Simon Hickey (4/5) 10', 15', 35', 60'; Pen: Simon Hickey (2/4) 7', 18'; Cards: Malakai Fekitoa (yellow card) 39'	Report	Try: Patrick Osborne 40'; Rob Thompson (2) 45', 48'; Con: Richie Mo'unga (2/3) 40', 46'

Eden Park, Auckland
Referee: Nick Briant

29 September 2013
14:35 NZST

Hawke's Bay	55–10	North Harbour
Try: Andrew Horrell 12'; Michael Allardice 39'; Zac Guildford 49'; Telusa Veainu (3) 61', 63', 79'; Brendon Edmonds 73'; Con: Ihaia West (3/5) 13', 50', 64'; Andrew Horrell (1/1) 73'; Trinity Spooner-Neera (0/1); Pen: Ihaia West (4/4) 6', 20', 34', 45'	Report	Try: Bryn Hall 7'; Con: Jon Elrick (1/1) 8'; Pen: Jon Elrick (1/1) 40'

McLean Park, Napier
Referee: Ben O'Keeffe

29 September 2013
16:35 NZST

Bay of Plenty	30–31	Counties Manukau
Try: Beau Robinson 25'; Nathan Harris 50'; Kane Hames 75'; Con: Willie Ripia (3/3) 26', 51', 76'; Pen: Willie Ripia (3/3) 14', 44', 66'	Report	Try: Maama Vaipulu 2'; Fritz Lee 11'; Hika Elliot 62'; Con: Baden Kerr (2/3) 12', 63'; Pen: Baden Kerr (4/5) 36', 53', 72', 80'

Rotorua International Stadium, Rotorua
Referee: Brendon Pickerill

=== Week 8 ===
2 October 2013
19:35 NZST

Tasman	64–28	Waikato
Try: Mitchell Scott 4'; Robbie Malneek 25'; Tom Marshall 40'; Joe Wheeler 45'; Liam Squire (2) 57', 80'; James Lowe 59'; Tevita Koloamatangi 77'; Con: Marty Banks (6/8) 5', 26', 40', 46', 58', 60'; Pen: Marty Banks (4/4) 9', 12', 22', 28'; Cards: Alex Ainley (red card) 67'	Report	Try: Vance Elliott 33'; Latu Talakai 52'; Josh Tyrell 70'; Toby Smith 73'; Con: Trent Renata (4/4) 34', 53', 71', 74'

Trafalgar Park, Nelson
Referee: Mike Fraser

3 October 2013
19:35 NZST

Southland	15–23	Hawke's Bay
Try: John Hardie 40'; Willis Halaholo 45'; Con: Scott Eade (1/2) 46'; Pen: Scott Eade (1/3) 17'	Report	Try: Zac Guildford 52'; Ihaia West 59'; Con: Ihaia West (2/2) 53', 60'; Pen: Ihaia West (3/3) 19', 36', 50'

Rugby Park Stadium, Invercargill
Referee: Richard Kelly

4 October 2013
19:35 NZST

Manawatu	22–16	Northland
Try: Heiden Bedwell-Curtis (2) 20', 61'; Lewis Marshall 72'; Con: Jade Te Rure (2/3) 21', 73'; Pen: Jade Te Rure (1/3) 45'	Report	Try: Whiria Meltzer 38'; Derek Carpenter 75'; Con: Daniel Hawkins (0/1); Ben Seymour (0/1); Pen: Daniel Hawkins (2/2) 2', 27'

Arena Manawatu, Palmerston North
Referee: Shane McDermott

5 October 2013
14:35 NZST

Bay of Plenty	25–28	Waikato
Try: Josh Sole 29'; Johan Bardoul 36'; Maritino Nemani 41'; Con: Willie Ripia (2/3) 38', 43'; Pen: Willie Ripia (2/2) 24', 50'	Report	Try: Jackson Willison 75'; Con: Trent Renata (1/1) 76'; Pen: Trent Renata (7/8) 11', 22', 27', 35', 46', 61', 66'

Baypark Stadium, Tauranga
Referee: Ben O'Keeffe

5 October 2013
17:35 NZST

North Harbour	23–37	Otago
Try: Francis Saili 37'; Brenton Helleur 78'; Con: Jon Elrick (2/2) 38', 79'; Pen: Jon Elrick (3/3) 7', 33', 57'	Report	Try: Jayden Spence 2'; Tony Ensor 34'; Sam Anderson-Heather 61'; Gareth Evans 70'; Con: Hayden Parker (3/3) 2', 35', 62'; Peter Breen (1/1) 71'; Pen: Hayden Parker (3/4) 13', 28', 31'

North Harbour Stadium, Albany
Referee: Michael Lash

5 October 2013
19:35 NZST

Wellington	38–16	Auckland
Try: Shaun Treeby 27'; Apisai Naikatini 36'; Ardie Savea 48'; Motu Matu'u 69'; Con: Lima Sopoaga (3/4) 28', 49', 70'; Pen: Lima Sopoaga (4/5) 7', 14', 26', 41'	Report	Try: Nathan Vella 77'; Con: Simon Hickey (1/1) 78'; Pen: Simon Hickey (3/4) 10', 24', 45'; Cards: Melani Nanai (yellow card) 64'

Wellington Regional Stadium, Wellington
Referee: Jonathon White

6 October 2013
14:35 NZST

Canterbury	38–23	Counties Manuaku
Try: Patrick Osborne 58'; Nasi Manu 62'; Luke Whitelock (2) 69', 73'; Con: Tyler Bleyendaal (2/3) 59', 70'; Richie Mo'unga (1/1) 74'; Pen: Tyler Bleyendaal (4/4) 3', 15', 33', 67'	Report	Try: Tyrone Lefau 27'; Sean Reidy 52'; Con: Ki Anufe (2/2) 28', 53'; Pen: Ki Anufe (3/3) 17', 22', 49'

Rugby League Park, Christchurch
Referee: Brendon Pickerill

6 October 2013
16:35 NZST

Taranaki	20–27	Tasman
Try: Seta Tamanivalu 54'; Andre Taylor 69'; Con: Andre Taylor (2/2) 55', 70'; Pen: Andre Taylor (2/2) 21', 28'	Report	Try: Joe Wheeler 24'; Mitchell Scott 35'; Con: Billy Guyton (1/2) 25'; Pen: Billy Guyton (5/6) 5', 9', 34', 50', 78'; Cards: Tim Perry (yellow card) 26'

Yarrow Stadium, New Plymouth
Referee: Grant Stuart

=== Week 9 ===
9 October 2013
19:35 NZST

Northland	21–31	Otago
Try: Sonatane Takulua 56'; Ross Wright 60'; Robbie Abel 72'; Con: Daniel Hawkins (3/3) 57', 61', 73'; Pen: Ben Seymour (0/1)	Report	Try: Scott Manson 18'; Matt Faddes 49'; Jayden Spence 66'; TJ Ioane 78'; Con: Peter Breen (0/2); Hayden Parker (1/2) 79'; Pen: Peter Breen (2/2) 35', 47'; Hayden Parker (1/1) 64'

Okara Park, Whangārei
Referee: Ben O'Keeffe

10 October 2013
19:35 NZST

Hawke's Bay	35–24	Wellington
Try: Zac Guildford 12'; Telusa Veainu 17'; Adam Bradey 62'; Ihaia West 74'; Con: Ihaia West (3/4) 13', 18', 75'; Pen: Ihaia West (3/3) 10', 35', 40'	Report	Try: Victor Vito 24'; Mark Reddish 37'; Afa Fa'atau 41'; Con: Lima Sopoaga (3/3) 25', 38', 42'; Pen: Lima Sopoaga (1/2) 60'

McLean Park, Napier
Referee: Glen Jackson

11 October 2013
19:35 NZST

RS – Counties Manukau	25–7	Southland
Try: Ronald Raaymakers 7'; Fritz Lee 11'; Ahsee Tuala 36'; Con: Baden Kerr (2/3) 8', 37'; Pen: Baden Kerr (2/3) 34', 72'	Report	Try: Robbie Robinson 58'; Con: Scott Eade (1/1) 59'; Pen: Scott Eade (0/1)

ECOLight Stadium, Pukekohe
Referee: Mike Fraser

12 October 2013
14:35 NZST

North Harbour	0–38	Canterbury
	Report	Try: Patrick Osborne 18'; Tyler Bleyendaal 23'; Luke Whitelock 28'; Rob Thompson 33'; Tom Taylor 66'; Willi Heinz 74'; Con: Tyler Bleyendaal (2/3) 24', 29'; Tom Taylor (2/3) 67', 75'; Pen: Tom Taylor (0/1)

North Harbour Stadium, Albany
Referee: Sheldon Eden-Whaitiri

12 October 2013
17:35 NZST

Northland	20–19	Bay of Plenty
Try: Mateo Malupo (2) 36', 51'; Rene Ranger 9'; Con: Daniel Hawkins (1/3) 10'; Pen: Daniel Hawkins (1/3) 34'; Cards: Bryce Williams (yellow card) 80'	Report	Try: Carl Axtens 18'; Nick Evemy 41'; Te Aihe Toma 80'; Con: Willie Ripia (1/2) 19'; Kendrick Lynn (1/1) 80'; Pen: Willie Ripia (0/1)

Okara Park, Whangārei
Referee: Kane McBride

12 October 2013
19:35 NZST

Waikato	22–14	Taranaki
Try: Jackson Willison 18'; Penalty try 32'; Sam Christie 41'; Con: Trent Renata (2/3) 33', 42'; Pen: Trent Renata (1/2) 8'	Report	Try: Seta Tamanivalu 55'; Andre Taylor 61'; Con: Andre Taylor (2/2) 56', 62'; Pen: Andre Taylor (0/2); Cards: Jarrad Hoeata (yellow card) 32'

Waikato Stadium, Hamilton
Referee: Shane McDermott

13 October 2013
14:35 NZST

Otago	37–33	Auckland
Try: Buxton Popoali'i 8'; Tom Donnelly 21'; Paul Grant 46'; Con: Hayden Parker (2/3) 9', 47'; Pen: Hayden Parker (6/7) 18', 25', 35', 51', 63', 66'	Report	Try: George Moala (2) 14', 68'; Hadleigh Parkes 29'; Lolagi Visinia 80'; Con: Simon Hickey (2/3) 30', 69'; Lolagi Visinia (0/1); Pen: Simon Hickey (3/3) 4', 40', 44'

Forsyth Barr Stadium, Dunedin
Referee: Jonathon White

13 October 2013
16:35 NZST

Tasman	57–14	Manawatu
Try: Billy Guyton 13'; Mitchell Scott 35'; Francis Smith 43'; Tim Perry (2) 48', 61'; Marty Banks (2) 68', 78'; Andy Symons 71'; Con: Marty Banks (7/8) 14', 36', 49', 62', 69', 72', 79'; Pen: Marty Banks (1/2) 2'	Report	Try: Jade Te Rure 8'; Lewis Marshall 26'; Con: Jade Te Rure (2/2) 9', 27'

Lansdowne Park, Blenheim
Referee: Michael Lash

== Play-offs ==
Championship

Semi-finals
1	Tasman	49
4	Southland	28
2	Otago	24
3	Hawke's Bay	29

Final
1	Tasman	26
3	Hawke's Bay	25

Premiership

Semi-finals
1	Wellington	41
4	Counties Manukau	10
2	Canterbury	56
3	Auckland	26

Final
1	Wellington	13
2	Canterbury	29

=== Semi-finals ===
==== Championship ====
19 October 2013
16:35 NZST

Tasman	49–28	Southland
Try: Koloamatangi 16' c Squire 27' c Scott 38' c Heem 59' m Malneek 63' c Banks 73' c Con: Banks (5/6) 17', 28', 39', 64', 74'; Pen: Banks (3/6) 19', 26', 34'	Report	Try: Eade 22' c Milne 48' c Dixon 56' c Murray 68' c Con: Eade (4/4) 23', 49', 57', 69'

Lansdowne Park, Blenheim
Referee: Kane McBride

20 October 2013
14:35 NZST

Otago	24–29	Hawke's Bay
Try: Faddes 12' c Evans 64' c Franklin 79' c Con: Parker (3/3) 13', 65', 79'; Pen: Parker (1/1) 7'; Cards: Manson (yellow card) 41'	Report	Try: Mathewson 33' c Buckman 58' c Con: West (2/2) 33', 59'; Pen: West (5/5) 10', 18', 25', 62', 67'

Forsyth Barr Stadium, Dunedin
Referee: Mike Fraser

==== Premiership ====
18 October 2013
19:35 NZST

Wellington	41–10	Counties Manukau
Try: Wilson 12' m Leiua (2) 33' c, 75' m Treeby 46' c Levave 64' c Curtis 69' c Con: Sopoaga (4/6) 34', 47', 64', 70'; Pen: Sopoaga (1/2) 25'	Report	Try: Lee 43' m Pulu 79' m Con: Anufe (0/1); Kerr (0/1)

Wellington Regional Stadium, Wellington
Referee: Nick Briant

19 October 2013
14:05 NZST

Canterbury	56–26	Auckland
Try: Bleyendaal 16' c Ellis 34' c Manu 38' m Whitelock 42' c Taufua 61' c Crotty 68' c Siataga 76' c Con: Bleyendaal (6/7) 17', 35', 43', 62', 69', 77'; Pen: Bleyendaal (3/3) 25', 33', 59'	Report	Try: Hickey 21' c Aso 56' c Con: Hickey (2/2) 22', 57'; Pen: Hickey (4/4) 7', 12', 28', 40'

Rugby League Park, Christchurch
Referee: Glen Jackson

=== Finals ===
==== Championship ====
25 October 2013
19:35 NZST

Tasman	26–25	Hawke's Bay
Try: Heem 11' c Squire 36' m Banks 49' m Con: Banks (1/3) 12'; Pen: Banks (3/4) 23', 27', 70'	Report	Try: Guildford 3' c O'Connor 59' c Eaton 79' m Con: West (2/3) 4', 60'; Pen: West (2/5) 15', 72'; Drop: West (0/1)

Trafalgar Park, Nelson
Referee: Glen Jackson

==== Premiership ====
26 October 2013
19:35 NZST

Wellington	13–29	Canterbury
Try: Sopoaga 34' c Con: Sopoaga (1/1) 35'; Pen: Sopoaga (2/3) 13', 66'	Report	Try: Ellis 9' c Crotty 46' m Bleyendaal 59' c G. Whitelock 79' c Con: Taylor (3/4) 10', 60', 80'; Pen: Taylor (1/1) 69'

Wellington Regional Stadium, Wellington
Referee: Chris Pollock

FB	15	Charlie Ngatai
RW	14	Matt Proctor	(substituted off) 62'
OC	13	Tim Bateman
IC	12	Shaun Treeby
LW	11	Alapati Leiua
FH	10	Lima Sopoaga
SH	9	Frae Wilson	(substituted off) 66'
N8	8	Victor Vito (c)
OF	7	Ardie Savea	(substituted off) 71'
BF	6	Brad Shields
RL	5	Apisai Naikatini	(substituted off) 55'
LL	4	Mark Reddish	(substituted off) 74'
TP	3	Jeffrey Toomaga-Allen	(substituted off) 72'
HK	2	Motu Matu'u
LP	1	John Schwalger	(substituted off) 55'
Replacements:
PR	16	Reggie Goodes	(substituted on) 55'
PR	17	Eric Sione	(substituted on) 72'
LK	18	Genesis Mamea Lemalu	(substituted on) 74'
FL	19	Faifili Levave	(substituted on) 55'
FL	20	Adam Hill	(substituted on) 71'
SH	21	Tomasi Palu	(substituted on) 66'
WG	22	Ambrose Curtis	(substituted on) 62'

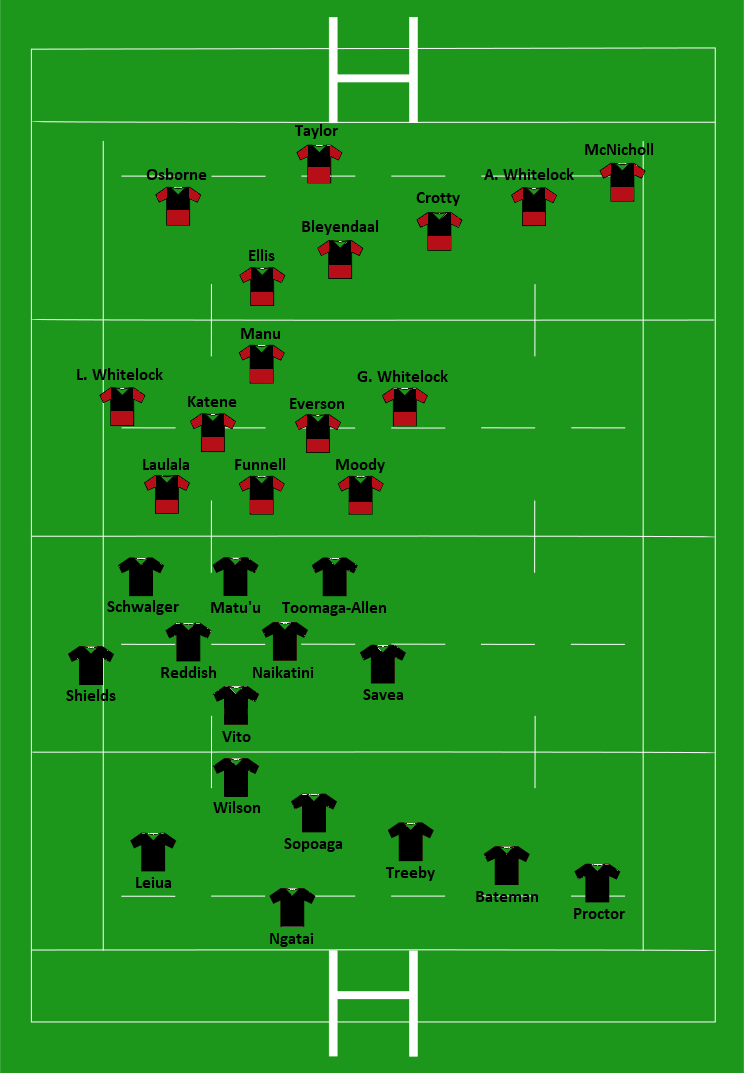

FB	15	Tom Taylor
RW	14	Patrick Osborne	(substituted off) 69'
OC	13	Adam Whitelock
IC	12	Ryan Crotty
LW	11	Johnny McNicholl
FH	10	Tyler Bleyendaal	(substituted off) 69'
SH	9	Andy Ellis	(substituted off) 60'
N8	8	Nasi Manu	(substituted off) 66'
OF	7	George Whitelock (c)
BF	6	Luke Whitelock
RL	5	Luke Katene	(substituted off) 47'
LL	4	Joel Everson
TP	3	Nepo Laulala
HK	2	Ben Funnell	(substituted off) 77'
LP	1	Joe Moody	(substituted off) 55'
Replacements:
HK	16	Marcel Cummings-Toone	(substituted on) 77'
PR	17	Paea Faʻanunu	(substituted on) 55'
LK	18	Dominic Bird	(substituted on) 47'
N8	19	Jordan Taufua	(substituted on) 66'
SH	20	Willi Heinz	(substituted on) 60'
CE	21	Rob Thompson	(substituted on) 69'
FH	22	Colin Slade	(substituted on) 69'

== Statistics ==
=== Leading point scorers ===
No.	Player	Team	Points	Average	Details
1	Marty Banks	Tasman	170	21.25	5 T, 29 C, 29 P, 0 D
2	Hayden Parker	Otago	170	15.45	2 T, 23 C, 38 P, 0 D
3	Ihaia West	Hawke's Bay	169	15.36	5 T, 24 C, 32 P, 0 D
4	Lima Sopoaga	Wellington	149	12.42	2 T, 35 C, 23 P, 0 D
5	Simon Hickey	Auckland	127	12.70	3 T, 20 C, 24 P, 0 D
6	Trent Renata	Waikato	120	12.00	2 T, 19 C, 24 P, 0 D
7	Willie Ripia	Bay of Plenty	119	11.90	1 T, 12 C, 30 P, 0 D
8	Tyler Bleyendaal	Canterbury	117	11.70	3 T, 21 C, 20 P, 0 D
9	Baden Kerr	Counties Manukau	95	11.88	0 T, 16 C, 21 P, 0 D
10	Scott Eade	Southland	92	8.36	2 T, 14 C, 18 P, 0 D

Source: The weekly reviews of the matches published on provincial.rugby (see "Report" in the individual match scoring stats).

=== Leading try scorers ===
No.	Player	Team	Tries	Average
1	Milford Keresoma	Canterbury	8	1.00
2	Telusa Veainu	Hawke's Bay	7	0.58
3	James Lowe	Tasman	6	0.55
4	Liam Squire	Tasman	6	0.55
5	Lolagi Visinia	Auckland	6	0.55
6	Zac Guildford	Hawke's Bay	6	0.60
7	Ross Filipo	Wellington	5	1.67
8	Marty Banks	Tasman	5	0.63
9	Frank Halai	Counties Manukau	5	0.56
10	George Moala	Auckland	5	0.50

Source: The weekly reviews of the matches published on provincial.rugby (see "Report" in the individual match scoring stats).

=== Points by week ===
Team	1		2		3		4		5		6		7		8		9		Total		Average	
Auckland	27	20	21	18	32	17	73	35	24	42	41	10	39	19	16	38	33	37	306	236	34.00	26.20
Bay of Plenty	29	32	24	20	17	32	18	48	16	33	28	54	30	31	25	28	19	20	206	298	22.90	33.10
Canterbury	30	6	28	13	47	10	48	18	32	22	19	25	91	46	38	23	38	0	371	163	41.20	18.10
Counties Manukau	16	55	44	14	20	40	47	46	44	7	37	25	31	30	23	38	25	7	287	262	31.90	29.10
Hawke's Bay	45	18	20	24	20	19	24	27	41	49	9	18	55	10	23	15	35	24	272	204	30.20	22.70
Manawatu	18	45	18	21	15	42	15	12	27	17	41	52	19	78	22	16	14	57	189	340	21.00	37.70
North Harbour	20	27	14	44	60	68	12	15	23	12	31	34	10	55	23	37	0	38	193	330	24.10	36.70
Northland	22	31	13	9	33	33	10	30	26	31	10	41	13	28	16	22	41	50	184	275	20.40	30.60
Otago	32	29	26	19	19	20	16	49	22	32	52	41	32	38	37	23	68	54	304	305	33.80	33.90
Southland	15	25	9	13	14	15	20	16	17	27	67	56	38	32	15	23	7	25	202	232	22.40	25.80
Taranaki	6	30	10	29	15	14	15	51	30	54	21	3	6	12	20	27	14	22	137	242	15.20	26.90
Tasman	25	15	13	28	40	20	49	16	12	23	18	9	28	13	91	48	57	14	333	186	37.00	20.70
Waikato	31	22	19	26	10	47	16	20	42	24	25	37	14	19	56	89	22	14	235	298	26.10	33.10
Wellington	55	16	29	10	77	42	30	10	33	16	25	19	19	14	38	16	24	35	330	178	36.70	19.80

Source: ITM Cup Fixtures and Results 2013

=== Tries by week ===
Team	1		2		3		4		5		6		7		8		9		Total		Average	
Auckland	4	2	2	2	4	1	7	4	4	6	6	1	5	3	1	4	4	3	37	26	4.10	2.90
Bay of Plenty	2	2	2	2	1	4	2	6	1	3	1	5	3	3	3	1	3	3	18	29	2.00	3.20
Canterbury	4	0	3	2	7	1	6	2	4	1	1	3	13	6	4	2	6	0	48	17	5.30	1.90
Counties Manukau	1	8	5	1	2	4	5	3	6	1	4	3	3	3	2	4	3	1	31	28	3.40	3.10
Hawke's Bay	7	2	2	2	2	2	2	3	4	4	0	2	7	1	2	2	4	3	30	21	3.30	2.30
Manawatu	2	7	2	2	2	5	3	2	3	2	5	6	1	10	3	2	2	8	23	44	2.60	4.90
North Harbour	2	4	1	5	7	8	2	3	2	0	3	5	1	7	2	4	0	6	20	42	2.50	4.70
Northland	1	3	1	0	4	4	1	5	2	3	1	6	1	1	2	3	6	7	19	32	2.10	3.60
Otago	2	2	2	1	2	2	1	6	1	4	6	5	4	5	4	2	7	7	29	34	3.20	3.80
Southland	0	2	0	1	1	2	2	1	2	3	8	4	5	4	2	2	1	3	21	22	2.30	2.40
Taranaki	0	4	1	4	2	1	2	6	3	7	2	0	0	0	2	2	2	3	14	27	1.60	3.00
Tasman	2	0	2	3	4	2	6	1	0	2	2	0	1	1	10	6	8	2	35	17	3.90	1.90
Waikato	3	1	1	2	1	7	1	2	6	4	3	4	1	3	5	11	3	2	24	36	2.70	4.00
Wellington	8	1	4	1	9	5	5	1	3	1	3	1	3	1	4	1	3	4	42	16	4.70	1.80

For	Against

Source: The weekly reviews of the matches published on provincial.rugby (see "Report" in the individual match scoring stats).

=== Sanctions ===
Player	Team	Red	Yellow	Sent off match(es)
Alex Ainley	Tasman	1	1	vs Hawke's Bay and Waikato
Zak Judge	North Harbour	1	0	vs Northland
Adam Hill	Wellington	1	0	vs Canterbury
Ardie Savea	Wellington	0	2	vs Canterbury and Waikato
Zac Guildford	Hawke's Bay	0	1	vs Bay of Plenty
Tomasi Cama	Manawatu	0	1	vs Auckland
Eric Sione	Wellington	0	1	vs North Harbour
Rene Ranger	Northland	0	1	vs North Harbour
Sherwin Stowers	Counties Manukau	0	1	vs Auckland
Jordan Taufua	Canterbury	0	1	vs Bay of Plenty
Tayler Adams	Southland	0	1	vs Waikato
Kieran Moffat	Otago	0	1	vs Tasman
Liam Coltman	Otago	0	1	vs Tasman
Ryan Cocker	Taranaki	0	1	vs Hawke's Bay
Rory Grice	Waikato	0	1	vs Auckland
Daniel Hawkins	Northland	0	1	vs Hawke's Bay
Paul Alo-Emile	Waikato	0	1	vs Counties Manukau
Augustine Pulu	Counties Manukau	0	1	vs Waikato
Chris Eaton	Hawke's Bay	0	1	vs Tasman
Sione Faletau	Canterbury	0	1	vs Manawatu
Antonio Kiri Kiri	Manawatu	0	1	vs Canterbury
Malakai Fekitoa	Auckland	0	1	vs Canterbury
Melani Nanai	Auckland	0	1	vs Wellington
Tim Perry	Tasman	0	1	vs Taranaki
Bryce Williams	Northland	0	1	vs Bay of Plenty
Jarrad Hoeata	Taranaki	0	1	vs Waikato
Scott Manson	Otago	0	1	vs Hawke's Bay

== Ranfurly Shield ==
=== Pre-season challenges ===
17 July 2013
14:35 NZST

Waikato	85–0	Horowhenua-Kapiti
Try: Douglas 2' c Leonard 5' c Webber (4) 17' c, 25' c, 31' c, 78' c Collier (2) 38' m, 50' m Graham 44' c Alainu'uese 57' c Robertson (2) 63' c, 67' m Faiva 65' c Con: Renata (8/11) 3', 6', 18', 26', 32', 45', 64', 79'; Hawera (1/1) 58'; Collier (1/1) 66'	Report	Pen: McBride (0/1)

Campbell Park, Morrinsville
Attendance: 3,000
Referee: Richard Kelly

30 July 2013
14:35 NZST

Waikato	65–10	Ngāti Porou East Coast
Try: Masirewa (3) 15' m, 56' c, 70' m Alainu'uese 17' c Mikkelson (2) 37' c, 54' c Talakai 45' m Douglas (2) 59' m, 78' c Snowden 65' c Con: Renata (6/10) 18', 38', 55', 57, 66', 79'; Pen: Renata (1/2) 29'	Report	Try: Ingram 22' m Parata 40' m Con: Vorenasu (0/2)

Whakarua Park, Ruatoria
Attendance: 2,000
Referee: Nick Briant

== See also ==
- 2013 Heartland Championship
