= 2014 Chiefs (Super Rugby) season =

Chiefs
- 2014 season
- Head coach: Dave Rennie
- Captain: Liam Messam; Aaron Cruden; Brodie Retallick
- Stadium: Waikato Stadium, Hamilton; Baypark Stadium, Mount Maunganui; ECOLight Stadium, Pukekohe; Yarrow Stadium, New Plymouth
- Overall competition: 5th
- N.Z. Conference: 2nd
- Record: Won 8, Drew 2, Lost 7
- Top try scorer: All: Tim Nanai-Williams (7)
- Top points scorer: All: Aaron Cruden (104)

The year 2014 was a challenging year for the Chiefs rugby team as they looked for their third straight super rugby title. They won eight of their Super Rugby games and finished fifth overall on the table, and second behind the Crusaders in the New Zealand Conference. Playing the Brumbies in the qualifying finals, they had a narrow loss, losing 32-30, which ended their super rugby season.

== Standings ==
The final standings of the 2014 Super Rugby season were:

New Zealand Conference
Pos	Team	P	W	D	L	PF	PA	PD	TF	TA	TB	LB	Pts
1	Crusaders	16	11	0	5	445	322	+123	41	36	4	3	51
2	Chiefs	16	8	2	6	384	378	+6	44	35	5	3	44
3	Highlanders	16	8	0	8	401	442	−41	39	52	5	5	42
4	Hurricanes	16	8	0	8	439	374	+65	49	36	6	3	41
5	Blues	16	7	0	9	419	395	+24	46	43	6	3	37

Overall standings
Pos	Team	P	W	D	L	PF	PA	PD	TF	TA	TB	LB	Pts
1	(Australia) Waratahs	16	12	0	4	481	272	+209	55	24	9	1	58
2	(New Zealand) Crusaders	16	11	0	5	445	322	+123	41	36	4	3	51
3	(South Africa) Sharks	16	11	0	5	406	293	+113	29	22	2	4	50
4	(Australia) Brumbies	16	10	0	6	412	378	+34	49	35	4	1	45
5	(New Zealand) Chiefs	16	8	2	6	384	378	+6	44	35	5	3	44
6	(New Zealand) Highlanders	16	8	0	8	401	442	−41	39	52	5	5	42
7	(New Zealand) Hurricanes	16	8	0	8	439	374	+65	49	36	6	3	41
8	(Australia) Force	16	9	0	7	343	393	−50	37	40	3	1	40
9	(South Africa) Bulls	16	7	1	8	365	335	+30	28	29	3	5	38
10	(New Zealand) Blues	16	7	0	9	419	395	+24	46	43	6	3	37
11	(South Africa) Stormers	16	7	0	9	290	326	−36	30	29	2	2	32
12	(South Africa) Lions	16	7	0	9	367	413	−46	31	46	2	1	31
13	(Australia) Reds	16	5	0	11	374	493	−119	42	52	4	4	28
14	(South Africa) Cheetahs	16	4	1	11	372	527	−155	38	59	3	3	24
15	(Australia) Rebels	16	4	0	12	303	460	−157	29	49	1	4	21

== Results ==
The following fixtures were released 7 October 2013.

Round 2	21 February 2014	Crusaders	10–18	Chiefs	AMI Stadium, Christchurch
	19:35	Try: Sam Whitelock 49'; Con: Tom Taylor 50' (1/1); Pen: Tyler Bleyendaal (0/5); Tom Taylor 74' (1/3); Cards: Dominic Bird (yellow card) 37' to 42'; George Whitelock (yellow card) 44' to 56'	Report; Scoreboard	Try: Robbie Fruean 10'; James Lowe 79'; Con: Aaron Cruden 80' (1/2); Pen: Aaron Cruden 39', 45' (2/2); Cards: Ben Tameifuna (yellow card) 40' to 50'	Attendance: 17,300; Referee: Chris Pollock

Round 3	1 March 2014	Chiefs	21–19	Highlanders	Waikato Stadium, Hamilton
	19:35	Try: Tim Nanai-Williams 10'; Liam Messam 48'; Charlie Ngatai 68'; Con: Aaron Cruden 11', 49', 69' (3/3); Pen: Aaron Cruden (0/2)	Report; Scoreboard	Try: John Hardie 32'; Con: Lima Sopoaga 33' (1/1); Pen: Lima Sopoaga 3', 20', 38', 58' (4/4)	Attendance: 14,120; Referee: Rohan Hoffmann

Round 5	14 March 2014	Chiefs	36–20	Stormers	Waikato Stadium, Hamilton
	19:35	Try: James Lowe 16'; Tom Marshall 40'; Tawera Kerr-Barlow 41'; Tevita Koloamatangi 77'; Tanerau Latimer 81'; Con: Aaron Cruden 17', 40', 42', 78' (4/4); Tanerau Latimer (0/1); Pen: Aaron Cruden 5' (1/2)	Report; Scoreboard	Try: Gio Aplon 62'; Nizaam Carr 75'; Con: Peter Grant 63', 76' (2/2); Pen: Demetri Catrakilis 2', 20' (2/3)	Attendance: 14,000; Referee: Craig Joubert

Round 6	22 March 2014	Force	18–15	Chiefs	{{{s}}}, [[{{{slan}}}]]
	19:00	Try: Matt Hodgson 13', 46'; Con: Sias Ebersohn 47' (1/2); Pen: Sias Ebersohn 26', 58' (2/3)	Report; Scoreboard	Pen: Aaron Cruden 18', 31', 40', 62' (4/4); Gareth Anscombe 44' (1/1); Cards: Michael Fitzgerald (yellow card) 36' to 47'	Attendance: 16,380; Referee: Lourens van der Merwe

Round 7	29 March 2014	Bulls	34–34	Chiefs	Loftus Versfeld, Pretoria
	15:00	Try: Deon Stegmann 30' penalty try 45'; Bjorn Basson 49'; Con: Jacques-Louis Potgieter 46', 50' (2/3); Pen: Jacques-Louis Potgieter 10', 23', 40', 55', 75' (5/5); Drop: Jacques-Louis Potgieter (0/1)	Report; Scoreboard	Try: Mils Muliaina 14'; Liam Messam 18'; Gareth Anscombe 70'; Matt Symons 76'; Aaron Cruden 80'; Con: Aaron Cruden 19' (1/2); Gareth Anscombe 71', 81' (2/3); Pen: Aaron Cruden 37' (1/3); Cards: Matt Symons (yellow card) 46' to 56'	Attendance: 24,164; Referee: Craig Joubert

Round 8	5 April 2014	Cheetahs	43–43	Chiefs	Free State Stadium, Bloemfontein
	15:00	Try: Sarel Pretorius 7', 35'; Rayno Benjamin 15'; Boom Prinsloo 38'; Con: Johan Goosen 8', 16', 36', 39' (4/4); Pen: Johan Goosen 19', 30', 55', 72', 78' (5/7); Drop: Johan Goosen (0/1)	Report; Scoreboard	Try: Augustine Pulu 27', 52'; Tim Nanai-Williams 60', 82'; Asaeli Tikoirotuma 63', 70'; Con: Aaron Cruden 28', 53', 64', 70', 83' (5/6); Pen: Aaron Cruden 13' (1/1); Asaeli Tikoirotuma (0/1)	Attendance: 14,993; Referee: Craig Joubert

Round 9	12 April 2014	Chiefs	22–16	Rebels	Waikato Stadium, Hamilton
	19:35	Try: Michael Fitzgerald 15'; Con: Gareth Anscombe 16' (1/1); Pen: Gareth Anscombe 3', 8', 12', 25', 58' (5/5); Cards: Pauliasi Manu (yellow card) 76'	Report; Scoreboard	Try: Shota Horie 44'; Con: Jason Woodward 45' (1/1); Pen: Jason Woodward 28', 40', 65' (3/4); Cards: Scott Higginbotham (yellow card) 55' to 66'	Attendance: 11,845; Referee: Matt O'Brien

Round 10	19 April 2014	Chiefs	17–18	Crusaders	Waikato Stadium, Hamilton
	19:35	Try: Tom Marshall 40'; Con: Gareth Anscombe (0/1); Pen: Gareth Anscombe 14', 29', 32', 38' (4/5)	Report; Scoreboard	Pen: Colin Slade 5', 10', 16', 50', 69', 72' (6/8); Cards: Dominic Bird (yellow card) 28' to 39'	Attendance: 17,097; Referee: Garratt Williamson

Round 11	25 April 2014	Brumbies	41–23	Chiefs	GIO Stadium, Canberra
	17:40	Try: Matt To'omua 30', 81'; Joe Tomane 47'; Tevita Kuridrani 57', 61'; Con: Christian Lealiifano 31' (1/4); Nic White 62' (1/1); Pen: Christian Lealiifano 18', 37' (2/3); Nic White 54', 64' (2/2)	Report; Scoreboard	Try: Brad Weber 74'; Josh Hohneck 79'; Con: Andrew Horrell 74', 80' (2/2); Pen: Gareth Anscombe 10', 25', 45' (3/4); Cards: James Lowe (yellow card) 53' to 63'	Attendance: 16,159; Referee: Steve Walsh

Round 12	3 May 2014	Chiefs	38–8	Lions	Waikato Stadium, Hamilton
	19:35	Try: Gareth Anscombe 23'; Tanerau Latimer 38'; Charlie Ngatai 40'; Pauliasi Manu 44'; Bundee Aki 72'; Tim Nanai-Williams 76'; Con: Gareth Anscombe 24', 40', 45' (3/4); Andrew Horrell 77' (1/2); Pen: Gareth Anscombe (0/1)	Report; Scoreboard	Try: Courtnall Skosan 47'; Con: Elton Jantjies (0/1); Pen: Elton Jantjies 9' (1/2)	Attendance: 11,168; Referee: Chris Pollock

Round 13	9 May 2014	Chiefs	32–20	Blues	Yarrow Stadium, New Plymouth
	19:35	Try: Ben Tameifuna 11', 43'; Tim Nanai-Williams 21'; Tom Marshall 51'; Con: Gareth Anscombe 12', 22', 52' (3/4); Pen: Gareth Anscombe 29', 40' (2/3); Cards: Tim Nanai-Williams (yellow card) 65' to 75'	Report; Scoreboard	Try: Lolagi Visinia 7'; George Moala 68'; Con: Simon Hickey 8' (1/1); Ihaia West 69' (1/1); Pen: Simon Hickey 31', 36' (2/2)	Attendance: 10,888; Referee: Mike Fraser

Round 15	24 May 2014	Hurricanes	45–8	Chiefs	Westpac Stadium, Wellington
	19:35	Try: Andre Taylor 4'; Ben Franks 21'; Julian Savea 30', 51'; Jack Lam 63'; Brad Shields 72'; Con: Beauden Barrett 5', 22', 31', 52', 64', 73' (6/6); Pen: Beauden Barrett 47' (1/1); Cards: Reggie Goodes (yellow card) 55' to 65'	Report; Scoreboard	Try: Liam Squire 15'; Con: Gareth Anscombe (0/1); Pen: Gareth Anscombe 3' (1/1); Cards: Brodie Retallick (yellow card) 60' to 70'	Attendance: 10,334; Referee: Angus Gardner

Round 16	31 May 2014	Chiefs	17–33	Waratahs	Yarrow Stadium, New Plymouth
	16:35	Try: Bundee Aki 55', 62'; Con: Aaron Cruden 56', 63' (2/2); Pen: Aaron Cruden 3' (1/2)	Report; Scoreboard	Try: Israel Folau 15'; Dave Dennis 72'; Bernard Foley 80'; Con: Bernard Foley 16', 73', 81' (3/3); Pen: Bernard Foley 9', 27', 68' (3/3); Kurtley Beale 58' (1/1)	Referee: Chris Pollock

Round 17	27 June 2014	Highlanders	29–25	Chiefs	Forsyth Barr Stadium, Dunedin
	19:35	Try: Patrick Osborne 14'; Ben Smith 49'; Con: Lima Sopoaga 15', 50' (2/2); Pen: Lima Sopoaga 35', 43', 54', 60' (4/4); Hayden Parker 73' (1/1); Drop: Hayden Parker (0/1)	Report; Scoreboard	Try: Dwayne Sweeney 17'; Tim Nanai-Williams 67'; Josh Hohneck 76'; Con: Aaron Cruden 18', 76' (2/3); Pen: Aaron Cruden 7' (1/1); Gareth Anscombe 30' (1/1)	Referee: Garratt Williamson

Round 18	4 July 2014	Chiefs	24–16	Hurricanes	Waikato Stadium, Hamilton
	19:35	Try: Jamie Mackintosh 28'; Brodie Retallick 62'; Con: Aaron Cruden 29' (1/2); Pen: Aaron Cruden 21', 37', 40', 58' (4/6)	Report; Scoreboard	Try: Hadleigh Parkes 65'; Con: Beauden Barrett 66' (1/1); Pen: Beauden Barrett 23', 34', 46' (3/5)	Referee: Nick Briant

Round 19	11 July 2014	Blues	8–11	Chiefs	Eden Park, Auckland
	19:35	Try: George Moala 69'; Con: Ihaia West (0/1); Pen: Ihaia West 44' (1/2); Cards: Ma'a Nonu (yellow card) 36' to 47'	Report; Scoreboard	Try: Liam Messam 49'; Con: Aaron Cruden (0/1); Pen: Aaron Cruden 24', 62' (2/4); Gareth Anscombe (0/1); Cards: Michael Fitzgerald (yellow card) 66' to 76'	Referee: Glen Jackson

Qualifier	19 July 2014	Brumbies	32–30	Chiefs	GIO Stadium, Canberra
	19:40	Try: Nic White 6'; Robbie Coleman 10'; Jesse Mogg 21'; Jarrad Butler 61'; Con: Christian Lealiifano 7', 11', 62' (3/4); Pen: Christian Lealiifano 29', 45' (2/4); Cards: Henry Speight (yellow card) 48' to 58'	Report; Scoreboard	Try: Bundee Aki 35'; Tawera Kerr-Barlow 50'; Tim Nanai-Williams 55'; Gareth Anscombe 77'; Con: Aaron Cruden 36', 51' (2/4); Pen: Aaron Cruden 3', 42' (2/2); Cards: Tim Nanai-Williams (yellow card) 5' to 16'	Attendance: 14,284; Referee: Craig Joubert

== Squad ==
The Chiefs squad for the 2014 Super Rugby season were:

2014 Chiefs squad
**Props**: (New Zealand) **Ben Afeaki**; (New Zealand) Nick Barrett; (New Zealand) Josh Hohneck; (New Zealand) **Jamie Mackintosh**; (Tonga) Pauliasi Manu; (New Zealand) Ben Tameifuna; **Hookers**: (New Zealand) **Hika Elliot**; (New Zealand) Nathan Harris; (New Zealand) Rhys Marshall; (Samoa) **Mahonri Schwalger**; **Locks**: (New Zealand) **Ross Filipo**; (New Zealand) Michael Fitzgerald; (New Zealand) **Brodie Retallick** (c); (England) Matt Symons; (Samoa) **Kane Thompson**	**Loose forwards**: (New Zealand) Carl Axtens; (New Zealand) **Sam Cane**; (New Zealand) Nick Crosswell; (New Zealand) Tevita Koloamatangi; (New Zealand) **Tanerau Latimer**; (New Zealand) **Liam Messam** (c); (New Zealand) **Liam Squire**; **Scrum-halves**: (Australia) **Tawera Kerr-Barlow**; (New Zealand) **Augustine Pulu**; (New Zealand) **Brad Weber**; **Fly-halves**: (New Zealand) **Aaron Cruden** (c); (New Zealand) Andrew Horrell	**Midfield**: (New Zealand) Bundee Aki; (New Zealand) Robbie Fruean; (New Zealand) Anton Lienert-Brown; (New Zealand) **Charlie Ngatai**; (New Zealand) Jordan Payne; (New Zealand) Dwayne Sweeney; **Wingers**: (New Zealand) James Lowe; (New Zealand) Tom Marshall; (New Zealand) **Tim Nanai-Williams**; (Fiji) **Asaeli Tikoirotuma**; **Fullbacks**: (New Zealand) **Gareth Anscombe**; (Samoa) **Mils Muliaina**; (New Zealand) Robbie Robinson
(c) denotes team captain, **Bold** denotes player is internationally capped.

== Player statistics ==
The Chiefs players' appearance and scoring statistics for the 2014 Super Rugby season are:

Player	Apps	Tries	Cons	Pens	DGs	Pts	YC	RC
Ben Afeaki	1	-	-	-	-	-	-	-
Bundee Aki	11	4	-	-	-	20	-	-
Gareth Anscombe	14	3	9	17	-	84	-	-
Carl Axtens	-	-	-	-	-	-	-	-
Nick Barrett	1	-	-	-	-	-	-	-
Sam Cane	10	-	-	-	-	-	-	-
Nick Crosswell	3	-	-	-	-	-	-	-
Aaron Cruden	12	1	21	19	-	104	-	-
Hika Elliot	-	-	-	-	-	-	-	-
Ross Filipo	3	-	-	-	-	-	-	-
Michael Fitzgerald	16	1	-	-	-	5	2	-
Robbie Fruean	4	1	-	-	-	5	-	-
Nathan Harris	10	-	-	-	-	-	-	-
Josh Hohneck	13	2	-	-	-	10	-	-
Andrew Horrell	11	-	3	-	-	6	-	-
Tawera Kerr-Barlow	15	2	-	-	-	10	-	-
Tevita Koloamatangi	5	1	-	-	-	5	-	-
Tanerau Latimer	15	2	-	-	-	10	-	-
Anton Lienert-Brown	3	-	-	-	-	-	-	-
James Lowe	10	2	-	-	-	10	1	-
Jamie Mackintosh	17	1	-	-	-	5	-	-
Pauliasi Manu	17	1	-	-	-	5	1	-
Rhys Marshall	9	-	-	-	-	-	-	-
Tom Marshall	15	3	-	-	-	15	-	-
Liam Messam	17	3	-	-	-	15	-	-
Mils Muliaina	6	1	-	-	-	5	-	-
Tim Nanai-Williams	17	7	-	-	-	35	2	-
Charlie Ngatai	6	2	-	-	-	10	-	-
Jordan Payne	2	-	-	-	-	-	-	-
Augustine Pulu	11	2	-	-	-	10	-	-
Brodie Retallick	16	1	-	-	-	5	1	-
Robbie Robinson	-	-	-	-	-	-	-	-
Mahonri Schwalger	13	-	-	-	-	-	-	-
Liam Squire	10	1	-	-	-	5	-	-
Dwayne Sweeney	8	1	-	-	-	5	-	-
Matt Symons	14	1	-	-	-	5	1	-
Ben Tameifuna	17	2	-	-	-	10	1	-
Kane Thompson	6	-	-	-	-	-	-	-
Asaeli Tikoirotuma	12	2	-	-	-	10	-	-
Brad Weber	7	1	-	-	-	5	-	-
Total	17	48	34	35	-	413	9	-
