= Ben Seymour =

Ben Seymour may refer to:

- Ben Seymour (rugby union)
- Ben Seymour (footballer)

== See also ==
- Benjamin Seymour, Canadian politician
