= Billy Guyton =

New Zealand rugby union player (1990–2023)

- Born: Billy-John Guyton; 17 March 1990 Timaru, New Zealand
- Died: 15 May 2023 (aged 33) Nelson, New Zealand
- Height: 1.86 m (6 ft 1 in)
- Weight: 90 kg (198 lb)
- School: Shirley Boys' High School; Nelson College

Rugby union career
- Position(s): Halfback; First five-eighth
Provincial / State sides
Years	Team	Apps	(Points)
2010–2012	North Otago	29	(89)
2013–2017	Tasman	52	(90)
Super Rugby
Years	Team	Apps	(Points)
2014	Hurricanes	1	(0)
2015	Crusaders	1	(0)
2016−2017	Blues	24	(10)
International career
Years	Team	Apps	(Points)
2016	Māori All Blacks	2	(0)

Billy-John Aaron Guyton (17 March 1990 – 15 May 2023) was a New Zealand rugby union player. His position was halfback, he played 52 games for provincial side Tasman between 2013 and 2017 as well as playing for the Blues, Hurricanes, Crusaders and the Māori All Blacks.

== Tasman ==
Guyton established himself as the starting halfback for Tasman during the 2013 ITM Cup in what was a successful season for the side where they won the championship division, with a one-point win over Hawke's Bay in the final, 26–25. This promoting the Mako to the premiership division.

== Super Rugby ==
After a strong season for the Mako, Guyton was part of the Hurricanes squad for the 2014 Super Rugby season. After only 1 game for the Hurricanes he was signed as an injury replacement for the Crusaders during the 2015 Super Rugby season after a season ending injury to Willi Heinz.

After only playing another 1 game for the Crusaders, Guyton signed with the Blues for the 2016 and 2017 seasons where he played 24 games.

== Māori All Blacks ==
In October 2016 Guyton, who affiliated with the Ngāpuhi, Ngāti Pikiao, and Ngāti Raukawa iwi, was named in the Māori All Blacks squad for their end of year tour to the Northern Hemisphere.

== Retirement and death ==
Guyton announced his retirement from playing rugby in October 2018, aged 28, after repeated concussions suffered in official matches had left him with symptoms of chronic traumatic encephalopathy (CTE).

He died in Nelson on 15 May 2023, at the age of 33. Reports in New Zealand media suggested Guyton died from suspected suicide.

Guyton's family decided to donate his brain to the Neurological Foundation Human Brain Bank at the University of Auckland; following post mortem analyses conducted in New Zealand and Australia, he was diagnosed with stage 2 CTE in March 2024, becoming the first New Zealand based player to be officially diagnosed with the disease. The pathologist's report also found that Guyton's brain presented trauma induced cavum septi pellucidi, as well as age related tau deposits.
