= Hayden Parker =

New Zealand rugby union player

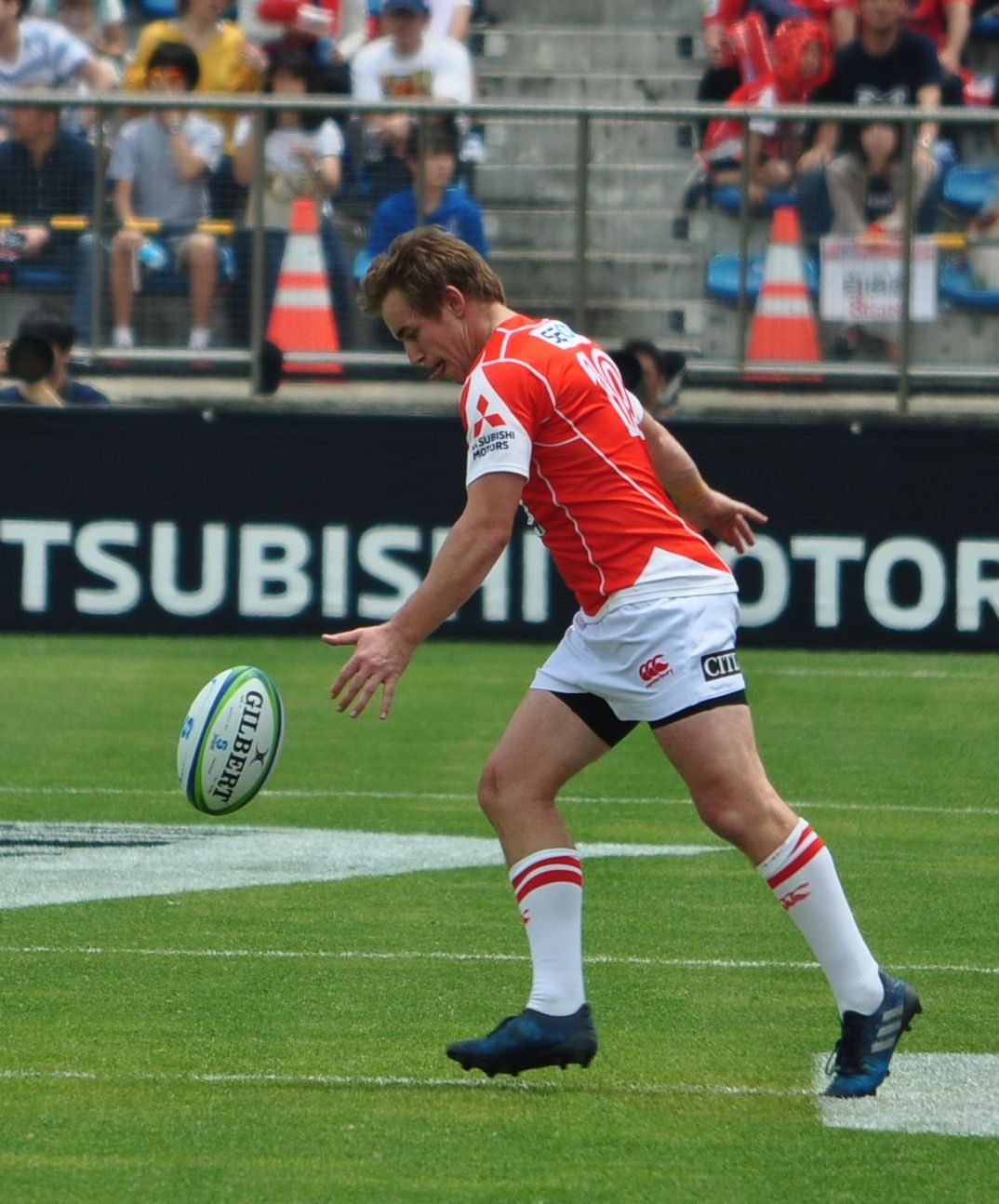
- Parker playing for the Sunwolves, May 2018
- Full name: Hayden John Parker
- Born: 19 November 1990 (age 35) Oamaru, New Zealand
- Height: 175 cm (5 ft 9 in)
- Weight: 84 kg (185 lb; 13 st 3 lb)
- School: Otago Boys' High School

Rugby union career
- Position: First five-eighth
Senior career
Years	Team	Apps	(Points)
2010–2017	Otago	47	(442)
2013–2016	Highlanders	30	(101)
2015–2016	Panasonic Wild Knights	7	(80)
2018–2019	Sunwolves	29	(248)
2018–2022	Kobelco Steelers	20	(168)
- Correct as of 10 May 2021
International career
Years	Team	Apps	(Points)
2010	New Zealand U20	5	(25)
- Correct as of 10 May 2021

Hayden John Parker (born 19 November 1990) is a New Zealand rugby union player who currently plays as a first five-eighth for the Japanese based HITO-Communications Sunwolves in Super Rugby and Otago in New Zealand's domestic Mitre 10 Cup.

== Early career ==
Born in Oamaru, the largest town in the district of North Otago on New Zealand's South Island, Parker was raised on his family's dairy and beef farm in the small community of Kurow 60 km to the north-west of his birthplace. He later headed south to Dunedin to attend the prestigious Otago Boys' High School and played first XV rugby for them. After graduating from high school, he began playing for the Taieri Eels in Dunedin's Premier club rugby competition.

== Senior career ==
Parker first played provincial rugby at the age of 19, debuting in a match against Taranaki on 26 August 2010. The season was a miserable one for Otago, who finished 14th and last, consigning themselves to a place in the newly formed Championship division for 2011, while the match against Taranaki was to be Parker's sole appearance for the season. He played 6 times the following year to help Otago to 3rd place on the Championship log, which saw them miss out on a playoff place only due to the shortened domestic season needed to accommodate the 2011 Rugby World Cup, but by 2012, he had become his province's first choice in the number 10 shirt. He played all 12 games for the Razorbacks as they made it to the final of the Championship playoffs before going down to Counties Manukau by a score of 41-16.

Parker continued to be a regular in Otago's starting XV through 2013 and 2014, playing 21 times across the 2 years as his side finished 2nd and 6th respectively on the log. He sat out the 2015 ITM Cup after undergoing surgery on a long-standing shoulder injury, however at the tournament's conclusion, back to full fitness, he headed to Japan to take up a short-term contract with Top League side the Panasonic Wild Knights. Originally a back-up to experienced Australian number 10, Berrick Barnes, Parker took over the reins following Barnes' injury and kept his place in the side as the Wild Knights defeated the Toshiba Brave Lupus in the final to lift their 3rd Top League title in as many years.

Returning to Otago for the 2016 Mitre 10 Cup, an ACL knee injury sustained in training with the Highlanders earlier in the year ruled him out of the entire campaign, and he was left to kick his heels as the Razorbacks topped the Championship log before a surprising defeat at home to North Harbour in the playoff final consigned them to another season of championship rugby in 2017.

== Super Rugby ==
After an excellent 2012 domestic season with Otago, it was announced that Parker would join Dunedin-based Super Rugby side, the Highlanders for the 2013 Super Rugby season. Facing tough competition from future All Black Lima Sopoaga to be back up to the experienced Colin Slade, Parker acquitted himself well, playing 10 times, including 3 starts as well as kicking 29 points as the Highlanders finished a disappointing 14th out 15 teams.

Slade departed for the Crusaders ahead of the 2014 Super Rugby season, but Parker once again found himself playing back up, this time to Sopoaga. He featured 11 times but started only 3 games as the Highlanders finished in 6th spot on the log to earn a place in the playoffs here they were eliminated by the Sharks at the quarter-final stage.

2015 would prove to be a historic year for the Highlanders, lifting the Super Rugby title for the first time in their history following a 21-14 victory over the Hurricanes in the final. Unfortunately for Parker, a shoulder injury which required surgery, limited him to just a solitary appearance and he had to watch from the sidelines as his teammates celebrated their great success.

Following a 3-month loan spell in Japan with the Panasonic Wild Knights, Parker returned ready to go in 2016 Super Rugby season, however with Sopoaga firmly entrenched as the franchise's first choice in the first five-eighth role, he once again found game time difficult to come by, starting just once and making a total of 8 appearances as the Highlanders surrendered their Super Rugby title, going down to the Lions in the semi-finals. A knee injury ruled him out of the latter half of the Super Rugby season and the whole of New Zealand's 2016 domestic season, however, despite this, new Highlanders head-coach, Tony Brown who had worked with Parker at domestic level, retained him in the squad for his first year in charge.

== International ==
Parker was a member of the New Zealand Under-20 side which won the 2010 IRB Junior World Championship in Argentina, scoring 25 points in 5 games which included 2 conversions in the 62-17 victory over Australia in the final.

== Career Honours ==
New Zealand Under-20

- IRB Junior World Championship - 2010

Highlanders

- Super Rugby - 2015

Panasonic Wild Knights

- Top League - 2015–16

== Super Rugby statistics ==
As of 12 January 2017

Season	Team	Games	Starts	Sub	Mins	Tries	Cons	Pens	Drops	Points	Yel	Red
2013	Highlanders	10	3	7	270	0	4	8	0	32	0	0
2014	Highlanders	11	3	8	361	1	5	10	2	51	0	0
2015	Highlanders	1	0	1	17	0	0	1	0	3	0	0
2016	Highlanders	8	1	7	146	0	3	3	0	15	0	0
2018	Sunwolves	10								99		
Total		30	7	23	794	1	12	22	0	101	0	0
