= Vince Aso =

NZ rugby union player

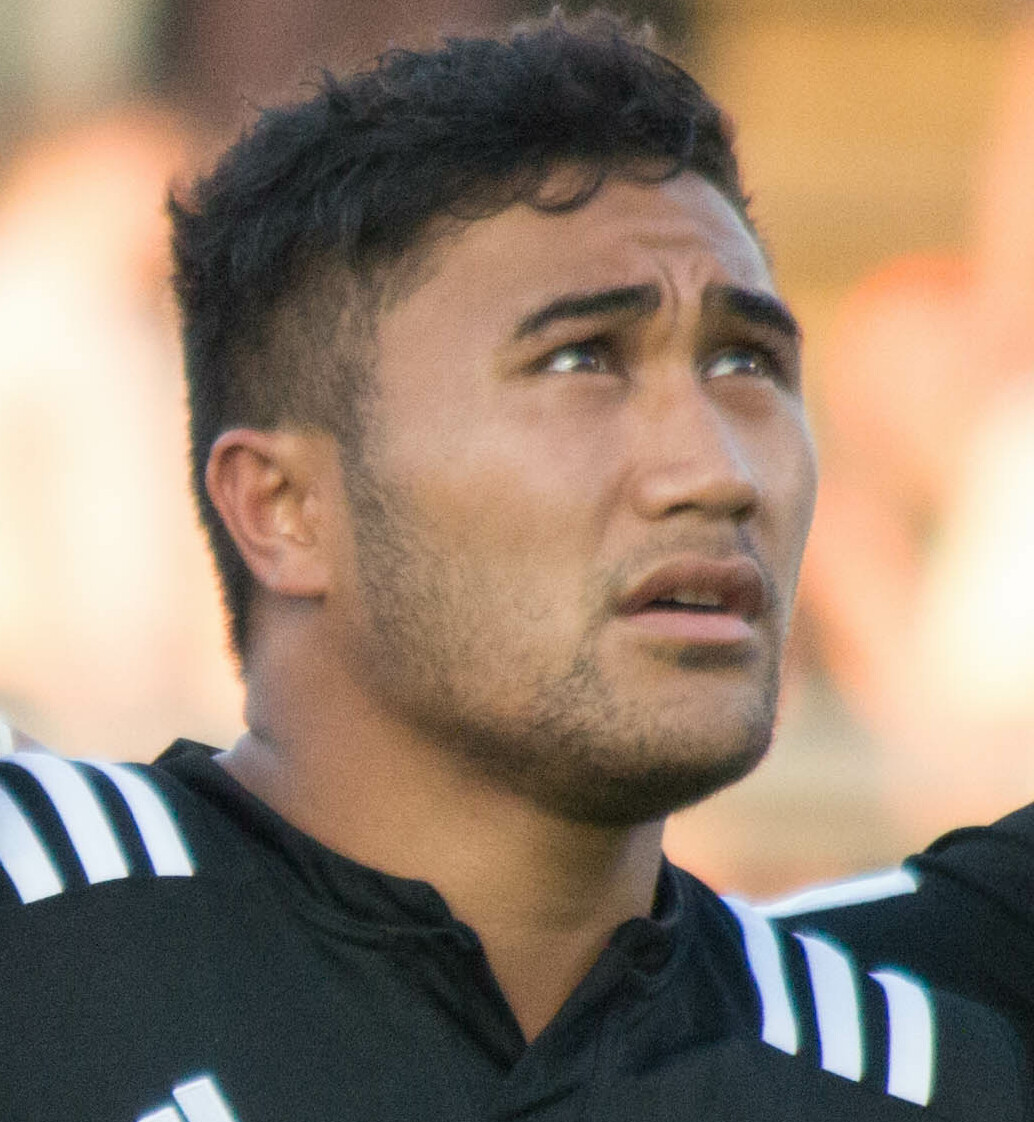
- Full name: Vincent Tavae Aso
- Born: 5 January 1995 (age 31) Auckland, New Zealand
- Height: 181 cm (5 ft 11 in)
- Weight: 90 kg (198 lb; 14 st 2 lb)
- School: St. Peter's College
- Notable relative(s): Akira Ioane (cousin); Rieko Ioane (cousin)

Rugby union career
- Position(s): Centre, Wing
- Current team: Urayasu D-Rocks
Senior career
Years	Team	Apps	(Points)
2013–2017	Auckland	38	(75)
2016–2021	Hurricanes	57	(110)
2019–2021	Wellington	25	(50)
2022–2026	Panasonic Wild Knights	60	(70)
2026–	Urayasu D-Rocks		
- Correct as of 16 March 2022
International career
Years	Team	Apps	(Points)
2014–2015	New Zealand U20	11	(25)
2017	Barbarian F.C.	2	(0)
- Correct as of 16 March 2022

Vince Aso (born 5 January 1995) is a New Zealand rugby union player who currently plays as a midfield back for Wellington in New Zealand's domestic Mitre 10 Cup and the Hurricanes in the international Super Rugby competition.

== Early career ==
Born and raised in Auckland, Aso attended St Peter's College in his hometown where he played first XV rugby. After finishing high school, he began playing for Ponsonby in the Gallaher Shield, Auckland's Premier club rugby competition. He also started working his way towards a Bachelor of Human Studies degree at the Victoria University of Wellington while supplementing his earnings with a part-time job as a builder.

== Senior career ==
Aso debuted for Auckland during the 2013 ITM Cup and racked up 4 tries in 7 appearances despite being aged just 18. He found opportunities harder to come by in 2014 especially in his preferred position in the midfield, playing only 3 times and scoring a solitary try. However, he was back in favour in 2015, featuring 8 times as Auckland reached the ITM Cup Premiership final before losing 25-23 to Canterbury. 2016 was not such a good season for the blue and whites as they ended up in 5th place on the Premiership log which saw them miss out on the playoffs, Aso started all 10 games for them during the year and helped himself to 2 tries.

== Super Rugby ==
Aged just 20 and with only 10 provincial games, Aso was named in the Hurricanes squad for the 2015 Super Rugby season. Having worked with 'Canes head-coach Chris Boyd before at New Zealand Under-20 level, Aso arrived in New Zealand's capital highly-rated, but lacking in experience, therefore it was perhaps no surprise that despite making the replacements bench several times during the year, he was unable to get on the park at any point to make his Super Rugby debut.

He did make the breakthrough in 2016, debuting in Conrad Smith's old number 13 jersey in the week 1, 52-10 hammering away to the Brumbies. Things would pick up considerably for the Hurricanes as the season progressed and they went on to finish the year as Super Rugby champions following a 20-3 victory over the Lions in the final. Aso struck up a fine midfield partnership with both Ngani Laumape and Willis Halaholo and scored 2 tries in 16 appearances during his first season as a regular in the Hurricanes starting XV.

== International ==
Aso was a New Zealand Schools representative in 2012 and later went on to be a member of the New Zealand Under-20 sides which competed in the 2014 IRB Junior World Championship and 2015 World Rugby Under 20 Championship. After finishing 3rd in the 2014 edition, Aso's stunning solo effort helped propel them to a 21-16 victory over England in the final of the 2015 tournament which was held in Italy.

== Career Honours ==
New Zealand Under-20

- World Rugby Under 20 Championship - 2015

Hurricanes

- Super Rugby - 2016

== Super Rugby Statistics ==
As of 24 January 2017

Season	Team	Games	Starts	Sub	Mins	Tries	Cons	Pens	Drops	Points	Yel	Red
2015	Hurricanes	0	0	0	0	0	0	0	0	0	0	0
2016	Hurricanes	16	11	5	883	2	0	0	0	10	0	0
Total		16	11	5	883	2	0	0	0	10	0	0
