= Jon Elrick =

Jonathan Elrick
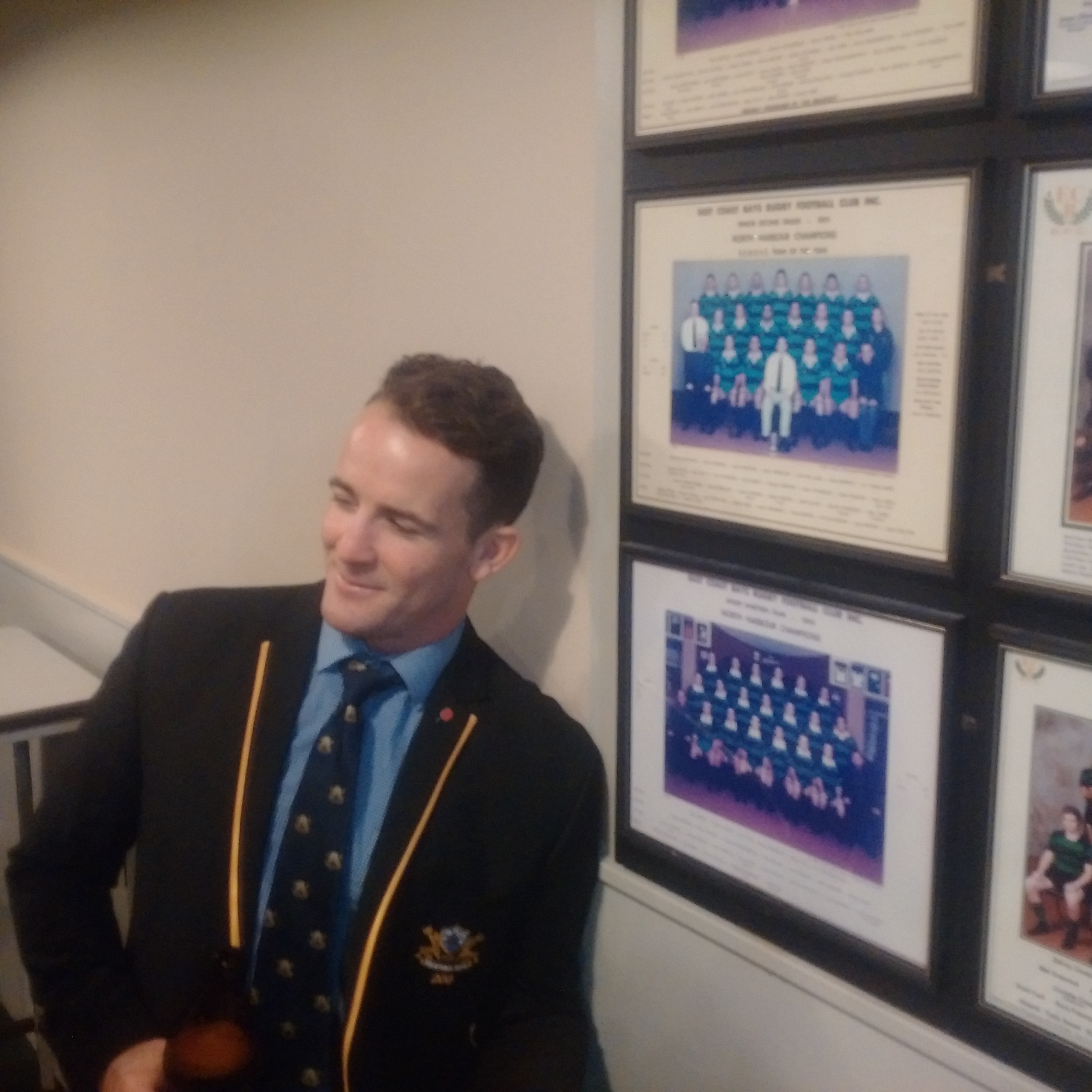
- Elrick in 2020
- Born: 11 October 1983 (age 43)
- Height: 1.80 m (5 ft 11 in)
- Weight: 88 kg (194 lb)
- School: Rangitoto College
- Notable relative: Adrian Elrick (father)

Rugby union career
- Position: Fly-half
Amateur team(s)
Years	Team	Apps	(Points)
2011–12	USA Limoges		
2012–13	CA Périgueux		
- Correct as of 31 August 2013
Senior career
Years	Team	Apps	(Points)
2006–07	Llandovery	10	(131)
2007–08	Bedford Blues	28	(144)
- Correct as of 26 April 2008
Provincial / State sides
Years	Team	Apps	(Points)
2005, 08, 13	North Harbour	19	(85)
2009	Northland	10	(0)
- Correct as of 22 October 2013

Jonathan "Jon" Elrick (born 11 October 1983) is a New Zealand rugby union player. He plays in the fly-half (and occasionally inside centre) position for the provincial based ITM Cup side North Harbour.

== Playing career ==
Elrick made his provincial debut for North Harbour in 2005, and in 2006 was signed by Welsh club Llandovery. Initially playing mainly at first five-eighth Elrick reached 131 points in ten appearances he also showed to be very good kicker and this was shown in Wales when he scored all of the team's points in six matches. In 2007 Elrick had moved to England to feature in the Bedford Blues. The move came about because of Elrick's agent knew Mike Rayer and he got in touch about coming to Bedford. The main reason Elrick came to Bedford was because the standard in Wales wasn't as good as he had hoped and he also was a second pick at fly half and wasn't getting enough playing time in New Zealand. He finished the season as the second highest individual points scorer with 144 points in 28 matches. Elrick left the team following their 2007/08 season. In 2008 Elrick returned to North Harbour and in 2009 he was linked with New Zealand club, Northland. He regularly played first-five eighth but again was a second pick in the position playing most of the season in the reserves.

In 2011 Elrick moved to France playing in the amateur Fédérale 1 competition for USA Limoges and CA Périgueux. He then returned to New Zealand for a second time to play for his home provincial union, North Harbour, in the opening game of the 2013 ITM Cup.

== Early life ==
Elrick come from a football background with both his parents playing for New Zealand. His dad Adrian won 91 caps playing football for New Zealand and starred in the 1982 World Cup even grabbing Zico's top after the Kiwis played Brazil. His mum Nadine played more than 60 times for the New Zealand ladies' team. Even Elrick himself received a call-up for the under-17 World Cup squad, but it was rugby that finally came calling.

Elrick didn't actually start playing rugby until he was 14 or 15 years old. When he went to college he was playing rugby in the morning and football in the afternoon. He finally had to make a decision and he chose rugby. All of his mates played rugby and he enjoyed the training and social side a lot more. Elrick's Dad was pretty disappointed because he was in the under-17 football squad, but Elrick never looked back. At 23 years old Elrick had definitely fitted plenty into his rugby playing career. The number 10 played his rugby for Takapuna Tigers in New Zealand and the provincial rugby team North Harbour.
