= Jayden Spence =

- Full name: Jayden John Spence
- Born: 14 August 1991 (age 35)
- Height: 181 cm (5 ft 11 in)
- Weight: 92 kg (203 lb)
- School: Dunstan High School

Rugby union career
- Position: Centre / Wing
Senior career
Years	Team	Apps	(Points)
2014–18	Union Bordeaux Bègles	27	(20)
Provincial / State sides
Years	Team	Apps	(Points)
2011–15	Otago	49	(55)

Jayden John Spence (born 14 August 1991) is a New Zealand former professional rugby union player.

Hailing from Alexandra in Central Otago, Spence attended Dunstan High School and was a member of the Highlanders wider training squad, while putting together 49 provincial appearances for Otago from 2011 to 2015. He was a Ranfurly Shield-winner with Otago in 2013 and featured in Kaikorai's 2016 premiership team.

Spence was signed by French club Union Bordeaux Bègles during the 2014–15 Top 14 season. He returned to Bordeaux in 2016, featuring in a further two Top 14 campaigns, before retiring from rugby due to concussion.
