= Scott Eade =

- Full name: Scott David Eade
- Born: 19 October 1992 (age 34) Invercargill, New Zealand
- Height: 1.75 m (5 ft 9 in)
- Weight: 83 kg (183 lb; 13 st 1 lb)
- School: Southland Boys' High School

Rugby union career
- Position(s): Scrum-half, Fly-half
- Current team: Southland
Senior career
Years	Team	Apps	(Points)
2011–2015	Southland	48	(196)
2015	Highlanders	1	(0)
2016	Otago	11	(30)
2017–2020	Southland	24	(103)
- Correct as of 3 February 2026
International career
Years	Team	Apps	(Points)
2012	New Zealand U20	5	(8)
- Correct as of 3 February 2026
Coaching career
- Years: Team
- 2025: Southland (assistant)
- 2026–: Southland
- Correct as of 3 February 2026

Scott David Eade (born 19 October 1992) is a New Zealand professional rugby union coach and former player who serves as the head coach of National Provincial Championship club Southland.
