= Tevita Koloamatangi =

- Born: Tevita Michael Paula Ma'afu Koloamatangi; 7 September 1988 (age 38) Auckland, New Zealand
- Height: 1.83 m (6 ft 0 in)
- Weight: 105 kg (16 st 7 lb; 231 lb)
- School: Nelson College

Rugby union career
- Position(s): Flanker, Number 8
Senior career
Years	Team	Apps	(Points)
2017	London Irish	1	(0)
2017–2021	Skyactivs Hiroshima	25	(40)
- Correct as of 17 October 2021
Provincial / State sides
Years	Team	Apps	(Points)
2010–2016, 2021	Tasman	43	(25)
- Correct as of 17 October 2021
Super Rugby
Years	Team	Apps	(Points)
2014–2016	Chiefs	10	(10)
- Correct as of 17 October 2021
International career
Years	Team	Apps	(Points)
2016	Tonga	3	(0)
- Correct as of 17 October 2021

Tevita Michael Paula Ma'afu Koloamatangi (born 7 September 1988) is a New Zealand rugby union player. His position is flanker.

== Career ==
As a result of his impressive showings during the 2013 ITM Cup, Koloamatangi was named in the Chiefs wider training squad ahead of the 2014 Super Rugby season. Good preseason form coupled with injuries to more established loose forwards such as Sam Cane and Tanerau Latimer saw Koloamatangi make his debut in Round 1 of the season, an 18-10 victory away to the Crusaders.

In February 2017 he was signed by English Championship side London Irish until the end of the season.

Koloamatangi attended Nelson College in 2006.

In 2021 Koloamatangi returned to New Zealand and was called in to the Tasman squad during the 2021 Bunnings NPC for a non competition match against Bay of Plenty. The Mako went on to make the premiership final before losing 23–20 to Waikato.
