= Augustine Pulu =

New Zealand-born Tongan rugby union player (born 1990)

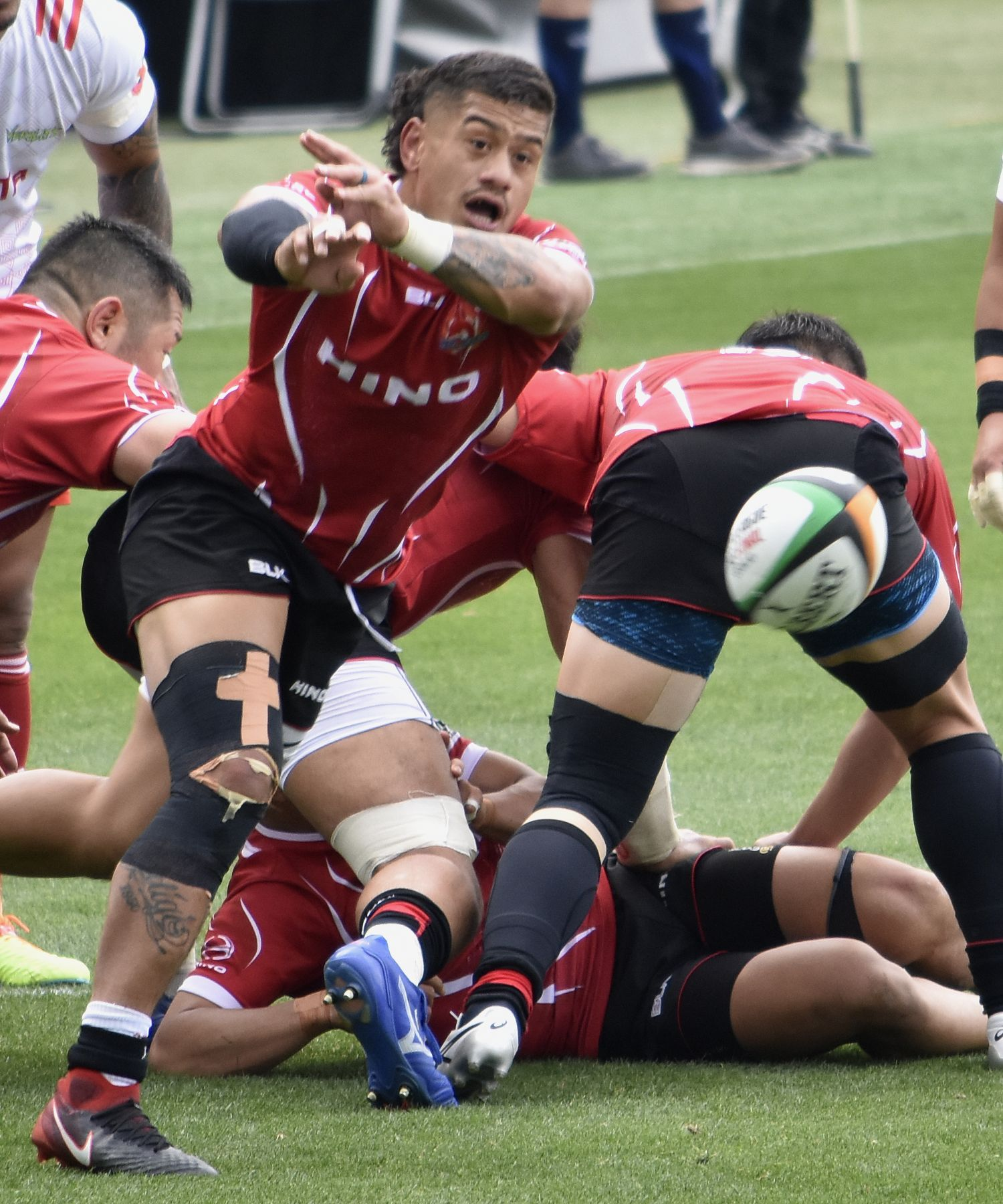
- Pulu representing Hino Red Dolphins during the Top League
- Born: 4 January 1990 (age 36) Auckland, New Zealand
- Height: 1.80 m (5 ft 11 in)
- Weight: 95 kg (209 lb; 14 st 13 lb)
- School: Wesley College

Rugby union career
- Position(s): Scrum-half, Fly-half, Centre
Senior career
Years	Team	Apps	(Points)
2009–2017	Counties Manukau	73	(80)
2012–2015	Chiefs	51	(30)
2017–2019	Blues	37	(45)
2018–2025	Hino Red Dolphins	39	(86)
2026	Moana Pasifika	1	(0)
- Correct as of 6 August 2026
International career
Years	Team	Apps	(Points)
2014	New Zealand	2	(0)
2022–	Tonga	10	(15)
- Correct as of 6 August 2026
National sevens team
Years	Team		Comps
2015–2016	New Zealand		7
- Correct as of 6 August 2026

Augustine Pulu (born 4 January 1990) is a professional rugby union player who plays as a scrum-half for Japan Rugby League One club Hino Red Dolphins. Born in New Zealand, he represents Tonga at international level after qualifying on ancestry grounds.

== Club career ==
Pulu began his senior career at the Karaka Rugby Football Club, where he debuted for the premier side in 2008. He was a member of the Chiefs wider training group for the 2012 season in which the Hamilton-based franchise claimed their first ever Super Rugby title, and was named in Dave Rennie's full squad for the 2013 season after playing an integral role in the Steelers' ITM Cup Championship triumph in 2012.

He helped the Chiefs win their second Super Rugby title in the final of the 2013 season against the Brumbies with a strong showing from the bench.

Pulu signed with the Blues for the 2017 season and instantly became a regular starter for the team, delivering many solid performances across the season. Pulu's 2017 season included a start against the touring British & Irish Lions team in the Blues' historic 22–16 win against them on 7 June 2017. Pulu played for almost the entire match before being replaced by rookie Sam Nock with nine minutes left. Pulu also had a good Mitre 10 Cup campaign, but had his season ended prematurely after receiving a two-week suspension due to being red-carded against Manawatu for a dangerous tackle on Jade Te Rure. Counties Manukau went on to win the match 29-24 without Pulu.

Despite being red-carded for Counties Manukau at the end of the 2017 season, Pulu was named by Blues Head Coach Tana Umaga as captain for the 2018 season, replacing veteran hooker James Parsons.

== International career ==
Pulu was called in to the All Blacks to cover for the injured Tawera Kerr-Barlow in 2014. Pulu made his debut for New Zealand in the 59th minute of a 74–6 win over the United States in Chicago, coming on for future Sevens and Blues team-mate Sonny Bill Williams. Pulu also replaced TJ Perenara with two minutes left in the 24–16 win over Scotland that year.

He made his New Zealand sevens debut in 2015. Pulu was selected for the New Zealand Rugby sevens at the 2016 Summer Olympics team but the team did not ultimately win a medal. Pulu was called into the All Blacks as a temporary replacement for troublesome veteran Aaron Smith during training for the third Bledisloe cup test of 2016, but did not play in that fixture.
