= Ryan Cocker =

- Born: 3 July 1992 (age 34) New Plymouth, Taranaki, New Zealand
- Height: 1.87 m (6 ft 1 1/2 in)
- Weight: 111 kg (245 lb)
- School: Waitara High School

Rugby union career
- Position: Prop
Provincial / State sides
Years	Team	Apps	(Points)
2013–	Taranaki	32	(0)
- Correct as of 23 October 2016
Super Rugby
Years	Team	Apps	(Points)
2016	Rebels	0	(0)
- Correct as of 6 August 2016

Ryan Cocker (born 3 July 1992) is a New Zealand rugby union footballer who currently plays as a tighthead prop for Taranaki in the ITM Cup. From the 2016 Super Rugby season he will also represent the Melbourne Rebels in Super Rugby after signing a 1-year deal with the franchise.
