= Andre Taylor =

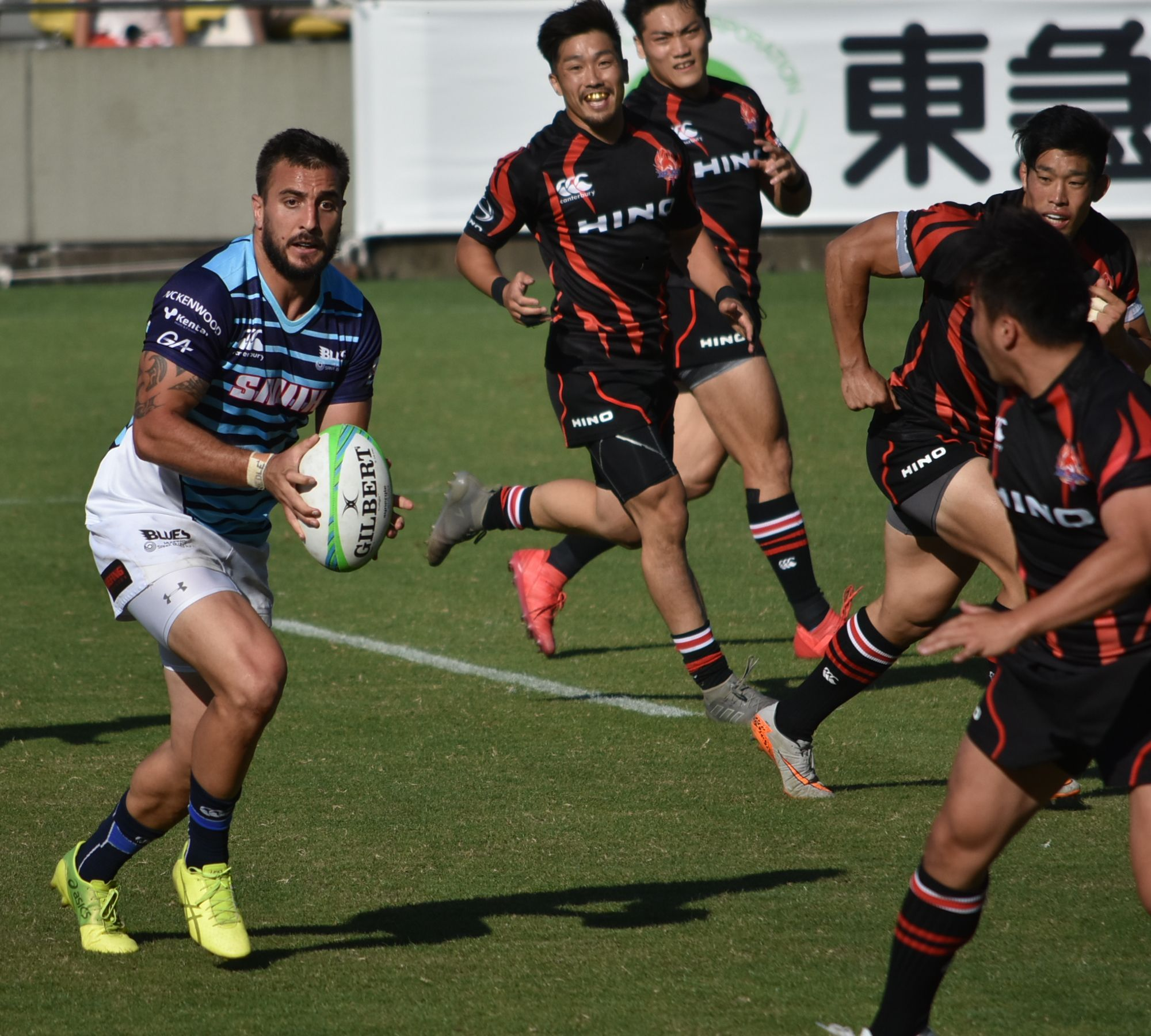
- Full name: Andre Steven Taylor
- Born: 11 January 1988 (age 38) Palmerston North, New Zealand
- Height: 180 cm (5 ft 11 in)
- Weight: 92 kg (203 lb; 14 st 7 lb)
- School: Palmerston North Boys' High School

Rugby union career
- Position(s): Fullback, Wing
- Current team: Munakata Sanix Blues
Senior career
Years	Team	Apps	(Points)
2006–2009, 2019	Manawatu	40	(100)
2010–2014	Hurricanes	54	(82)
2010–2013	Taranaki	33	(135)
2014–2017	Kintetsu Liners	22	(68)
2017–2019	Munakata Sanix Blues	6	(10)
- Correct as of 20 October 2018
International career
Years	Team	Apps	(Points)
2008	New Zealand U20	4	(25)
2010–2013	Māori All Blacks	4	(9)
- Correct as of 3 November 2013

Andre Taylor (born 11 January 1988) is a New Zealand rugby union player. He plays in the fullback (and occasionally wing or centre) position and most recently played for Kintetsu Liners of Japan, and previously played for the Wellington-based Super Rugby franchise, the Hurricanes. He has played for New Zealand's Māori international side, the Māori All Blacks. Also a former New Zealand under-20 rep, Taylor endeared himself to Hurricanes' fans with a superb Super Rugby season in 2012. Starting at fullback, he became a regular try-scoring threat, drawing comparisons with the great Christian Cullen. At provincial level he began his career with Manawatu, his home province before making the switch to Taranaki in early 2010.

== Early life ==
Born in Palmerston North, Taylor originally came out of the town of Ashhurst, just out of Palmerston North and attended the local school. He possibly made his way into Palmerston North as he grew older.

== Domestic career ==
Taylor came to the attention of rugby selectors at the age of 18, after he was selected in the Manawatu team to take part in the inaugural 2006 Air New Zealand Cup season while still at school. Taylor made his provincial debut for the side later that year against Taranaki. The following year he was signed by the Super Rugby side the Hurricanes to feature in their wider training squad. Taylor first joined the Hurricanes in 2010 on the back of an exciting Air New Zealand Cup season in which he proved a constant threat for opposition defences. Taylor capped off an excellent season by scoring 27 points in the Turbos’ final game of the 2009 season against North Harbour. He earned five caps for the Hurricanes in his first season, making his starting debut on the wing against the Sharks.

Taylor returned for another full season with the Hurricanes in 2011, and then helped his second province Taranaki to third place in the ITM Cup and reaching the Ranfurly Shield. At home at either wing or fullback, he chimed in with another big points scoring haul of 19 in the win over Tasman. The Hurricanes had scored 58 tries in 2012 and Taylor was part of many of these. He scored ten tries in 2012 and assisted in several more sharing the top try scorer of the season with Bjorn Basson of the Bulls.

Taylor's form in 2012 for Taranaki in the No 15 jersey was limited due to injury, he played five matches and recorded seven points. He made another 10 appearances at fullback with the Hurricanes in 2013.

== International career ==
In 2008 Taylor was selected in the New Zealand under-20 which won the world championship. Previously Taylor had played for the New Zealand Secondary Schools and New Zealand under-17 sides. Taylor had also been part of the triumphant New Zealand Māori side that won the 2010 Māori centenary series against the New Zealand Barbarians, Ireland and England.

Taylor rejoined the New Zealand Māori in their 2012 end of year tour, crossing the line once in three matches.
