= Chris Pollock =

New Zealand rugby union referee (born 1972)

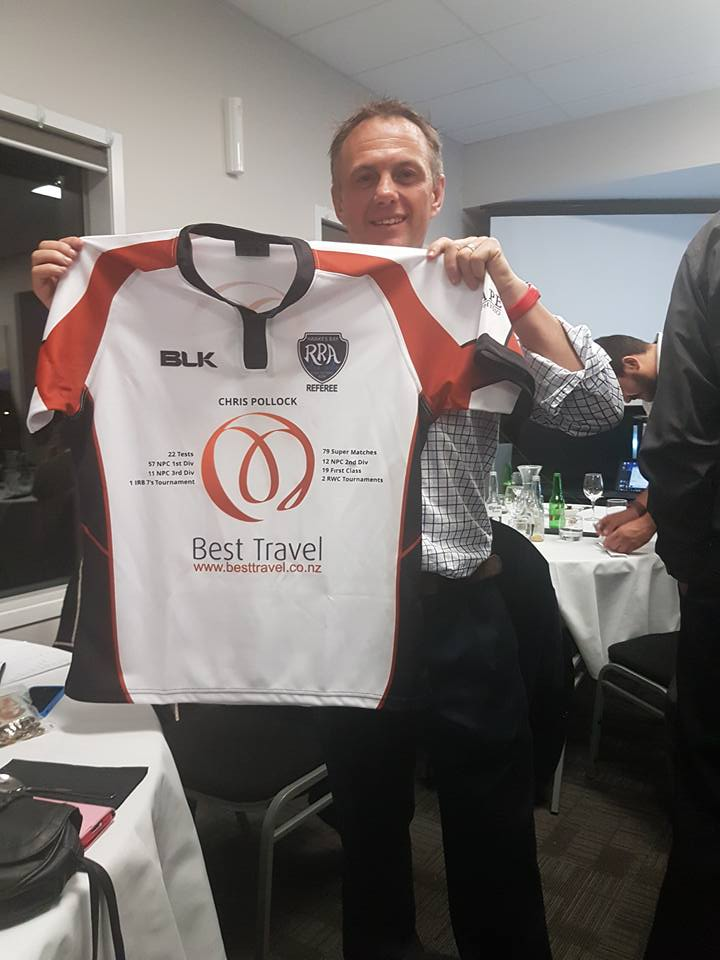
- Chris Pollock receiving a commemorative jersey from the Hawke's Bay Rugby Referees Association
- Born: Chris Pollock; 9 November 1972 (age 54) Taranaki

Rugby union career
Refereeing career
Years	Competition	Apps
2009	IRB Junior World Championship	
2011–15	Test Matches	22
2005–15	Six Nations Championship	
2013–15	Super Rugby	70
–	Rugby World Cup	11

Chris Pollock is a former rugby union referee who represented the New Zealand Rugby Union. In 2008, he was part of the IRB's touch judge panel. He made his international referee debut in 2005, when he refereed Niue vs Tahiti, while his first IRB appointment was in 2006, taking charge of Hong Kong vs Japan.

He was part of the 2011 Rugby World Cup referee panel, where he was assistant referee in 6 matches. After refereeing the match between Ireland and Scotland in the 2012 Six Nations Championship, he was among the game's elite officials with a place in the IRB selection for the 2012 June tests refereeing in the second test of Wales' tour to Australia.

In 2013, Pollock was responsible for introducing the ref-cam in the Super Rugby. During the round 2 derby match between Queensland Reds and New South Wales Waratahs, Pollock has a cam strapped round his head to show a different perspective to the game.

He was one of three referees who refereed a test during the 2013 British & Irish Lions tour to Australia, taking charge in the first test, and touch judging in the second and third alongside; Craig Joubert and Romain Poite. He claimed he was happy to be a part of this tour.

He was a referee in the 2015 Rugby World Cup, where he officiated 7 matches, two of which as the lead referee; England vs Uruguay and Scotland vs United States.

On 11 November 2015, the NZRU announced Pollock's retirement from international refereeing, having been refereeing since 1997 as well as internationally since 2008. He retired after officiating 22 tests. His last test match came on 10 October 2015, when England played Uruguay during the 2015 Rugby World Cup, though, he was one of the assistant referees for the Bronze Final between South Africa vs Argentina on 30 October 2015.

He is now NZR's High Performance Referee Manager taking over from Bryce Lawrence in 2022.
