= Ben Seymour (rugby union) =

- Born: Ben Seymour; 1 September 1990 (age 36) Napier, New Zealand
- Height: 1.81 m (5 ft 11 1/2 in)
- Weight: 90 kg (14 st 2 lb)

Rugby union career
- Position: Fly-Half / Full-Back
Senior career
Years	Team	Apps	(Points)
2012–13	Agen	13	(15)
- Correct as of 7 August 2013
Provincial / State sides
Years	Team	Apps	(Points)
2013–	Northland	10	(48)
- Correct as of 22 October 2013
Super Rugby
Years	Team	Apps	(Points)
2012	Force	13	(32)
- Correct as of 20 July 2012

Ben Seymour (born 1 September 1990) is an Australian rugby union footballer. His usual playing position is as a fly-half. He currently represents the Western Force in Super Rugby. He made his debut for the franchise in Round 2 of the 2012 Super Rugby season against the Reds in Brisbane.
