= Lima Sopoaga =

Fiji & NZ international rugby union player

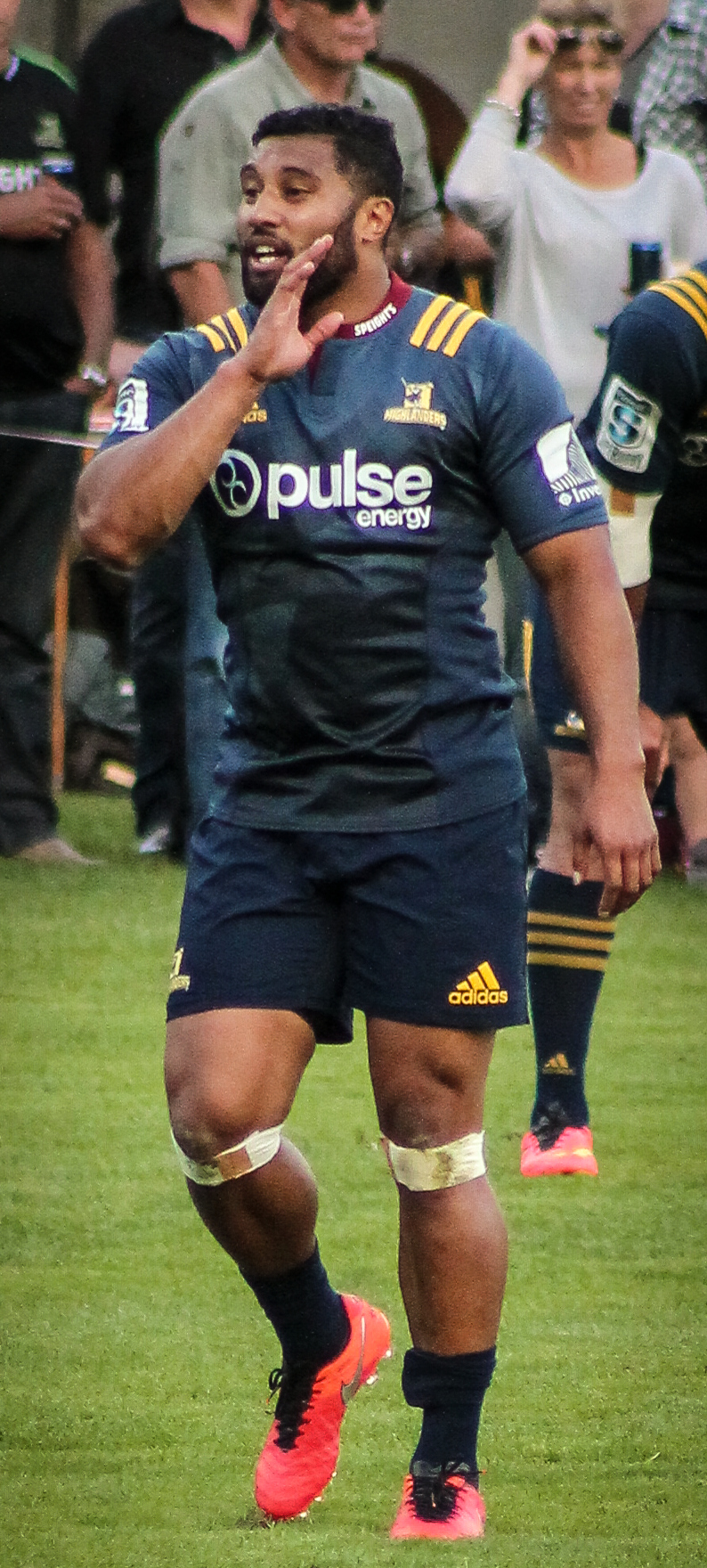
- Sopoaga representing the Highlanders during Super Rugby
- Full name: Lima Zachariah Sopoaga
- Born: 3 February 1991 (age 35) Wellington, New Zealand
- Height: 1.75 m (5 ft 9 in)
- Weight: 91 kg (201 lb; 14 st 5 lb)
- School: Wellington College; Hutt Valley High School
- Notable relative: Tupou Sopoaga (brother)

Rugby union career
- Position(s): Fly-half, Centre
- Current team: Waikato
Senior career
Years	Team	Apps	(Points)
2010–2013	Wellington	37	(370)
2011–2018	Highlanders	88	(853)
2014–2017	Southland	17	(187)
2018–2021	Wasps	53	(287)
2021–2023	Lyon	29	(147)
2023–2025	Shimizu Blue Sharks	21	(77)
2025–	Waikato	6	(28)
- Correct as of 28 July 2025
International career
Years	Team	Apps	(Points)
2011	New Zealand U20	4	(15)
2015–2017	New Zealand	16	(55)
2023	Samoa	4	(27)
- Correct as of 28 July 2025

Lima Zachariah Sopoaga (born 3 February 1991) is a professional rugby union player who plays as a fly-half for Japan Rugby League One club Shimizu Blue Sharks, and for Bunnings NPC club Waikato. Born in New Zealand, he represents Samoa at international level after qualifying on ancestry grounds.

== Club career ==
=== Wellington ===
At the age of 19, Sopoaga played for Wellington in the 2010 ITM Cup, making his debut against Manawatu. His strong performances established himself as the squad's starting number 10. He finished the season with 88 points in 9 appearances to help Wellington to reach the final of the competition, where he scored 21 points despite losing to Canterbury.

=== Southland ===
In late May 2014, Sopoaga announced that he will be joining the Southland Stags for the 2014 and 2015 seasons. The transfer from the Wellington Lions to the Stags keeps Sopoaga in Highlanders territory.

Sopoaga, excited by the move as reported by Rugby Southland; "The opportunity came up and it is a good fit to stay in the Highlander franchise and represent the region in the Super 15 and ITM Cup. I’m really starting to feel at home in the south now and proud to be part of the region.

=== Highlanders ===
Sopoaga followed his former Wellington coach Jamie Joseph south, signing on with the Highlanders for the 2011 Super Rugby season. Expected to back up Colin Slade, he ended up starting the opening game of the season against the Hurricanes due to Slade being injured. He responded in fine fashion by scoring a try and kicking two penalties in a 14–9 victory. In 2015 he helped guide the Highlanders to their first super rugby title by defeating the 1st place Hurricanes 21–14. Sopoaga scored the most points of any Super Rugby player in 2015, scoring 191 points that season.

The Highlanders failed to make the Grand Final in 2016, losing 42–30 against the Lions in the semi-final.

Sopoaga was pulled from the field in a 16–12 win over the Blues on 11 March 2017 after suffering a hamstring injury when he performed a try-saving tackle on All Blacks team-mate and Blues midfielder George Moala. Sopoaga made his return from injury to replace Marty Banks off the bench in a 55–6 win over the Western Force on 20 May 2017. The departing Banks scored more points in the 2017 Super Rugby season than Sopoaga due to Sopoaga spending two months out injured.

Sopoaga started for the Highlanders against the touring British and Irish Lions side on 13 June 2017, contributing eight points to the Highlanders' narrow 23–22 win over the Lions before being replaced by Banks in the 54th minute.

=== Wasps ===
On 15 January 2018, Sopoaga confirmed to be leaving the Highlanders and New Zealand to join top English side Wasps in the Gallagher Premiership from the 2018–19 season. Sopoaga made his Wasps debut on 8 September 2018 in a 31–42 defeat to Exeter Chiefs, he came on as a substitute in the second half and scored a conversion from a try scored by Dan Robson. He made his full starting debut the following game week, on 16 September, scoring 18 points (three conversions and four penalties) in a high scoring, 41–35 win over the Leicester Tigers.

=== Lyon ===
On 13 April 2021, Sopoaga would leave Wasps as he will travel to France to join Top 14 outfit Lyon from the 2021-22 season.

== International career ==
After an injury to Chiefs captain Aaron Cruden, Sopoaga's Super Rugby efforts in 2015 saw him gaining selection for New Zealand. Sopoaga was named in the All Blacks' 41-man squad for the 2015 Rugby Championship, making his international debut against South Africa in Johannesburg on 25 July 2015, debuting alongside lock James Broadhurst. Sopoaga started the match and was not subbed off, with replacement Beauden Barrett replacing Israel Dagg off the bench instead of Sopoaga who scored 12 points on debut, guiding the All Blacks to a 27–20 win. Sopoaga narrowly missed out on selection for the 2015 Rugby World Cup, with selectors preferring 100-plus test veteran Dan Carter and the versatility of Colin Slade and Barrett.

Sopoaga was re-selected for the All Blacks in the Steinlager series against Wales in 2016. After Cruden was injured again, Sopoaga made his second test appearance in the third test against Wales on 25 June 2016 which was a 46–6 win at Sopoaga'a home crowd in Dunedin. Sopoaga replaced Ryan Crotty off the bench in the 55th minute, covering inside centre for the rest of the test.

Following the departure of Aaron Cruden to France and the inexperienced Damian McKenzie being used at fullback, Sopoaga carried a far heavier workload for the All Blacks in the 2017 season. Sopoaga replaced Beauden Barrett in the 59th minute of a 78–0 win over Samoa, converting two tries. Sopoaga also went across for what would have been his first try that match, but it was disallowed after he received a forward pass from replacement scrum-half TJ Perenara. Following the win over Samoa, Sopoaga made another 11 appearances for the All Blacks that year.

Concussion to Barrett saw Sopoaga step up in the second test against South Africa in 2017, replacing Barrett only 33 minutes into the game. Sopoaga scored 7 points that day, converting tries by McKenzie and winger Rieko Ioane. Sopoaga also attempted a drop goal in the 76th minute but missed. Springbok replacement back Damian de Allende attempted to charge down the kick but was controversially red-carded for a late hit on Sopoaga. The Springboks were further punished by De Allende's mistake because of Sopoaga turning the penalty given into 3 points, the deciding factor in the All Blacks' 25–24 win that day.

Barrett's continued concussion symptoms saw Sopoaga named to start for only the second time in his international career, starting against the Wallabies for 2017's third Bledisloe Cup test on 22 October 2017. An attempted pass from Sopoaga to midfielder Sonny Bill Williams went wrong in the 6th minute of the test, with Wallabies winger Reece Hodge intercepting to score a try. Sopoaga recovered well to score 8 points but was subbed off in the 60th minute for David Havili, with McKenzie moving into first-five. The Wallabies went on to win 23–18.

Sopoaga made an appearance in every All Blacks fixture on the 2017 end-of-season tour, replacing Havili and McKenzie against the Barbarians and France. Sopoaga earned a mid-week start against a French XV on 14 November 2017 where Sopoaga did not miss a kick at goal. He was replaced by debutant Richie Mo'unga in the 53rd minute. Sopoaga followed up the performance against the French XV by replacing Waisake Naholo off the bench against Scotland and Wales. Sopoaga's signing announced with the Wasps will likely mean his appearance off the bench against Wales on 25 November 2017 will be his last test for New Zealand.

In late 2023, Sopoaga was selected to play for Samoa for the 2023 Rugby World Cup in France. He made his first appearance in a 28 to 14 victory over the Barbarians. He earned his first official cap the following week in a close 13 to 17 loss to Ireland. During pool play at the World Cup, Sopoaga appeared in two matches: the first was off of the bench in a dominant win over Chile, while the second match saw him start at fly-half in a one point loss to England.
