= Simon Hickey =

- Full name: Simon Christopher Hickey
- Born: 12 January 1994 (age 32) Auckland, New Zealand
- Height: 174 cm (5 ft 9 in)
- Weight: 83 kg (183 lb; 13 st 1 lb)
- School: King's College
- Notable relative: Jono Hickey (brother)

Rugby union career
- Position: First five-eighth
Senior career
Years	Team	Apps	(Points)
2012–2016, 2020-2021	Auckland	48	(418)
2014–2015	Blues	14	(124)
2015–2018	Bordeaux Bègles	44	(318)
2018–2020	Edinburgh	34	(182)
2020–21	Hurricanes	0	(0)
2022	Crusaders	5	(14)
2022-2026	Hino Red Dolphins	24	(161)
- Correct as of 20 May 2022
International career
Years	Team	Apps	(Points)
2013–2014	New Zealand U20	7	(49)
- Correct as of 22 November 2021

Simon Hickey (born 12 January 1994) is a New Zealand rugby union player who plays for Crusaders (rugby union) in the Super Rugby.

He has represented Auckland in the National Provincial Championship, playing as a first five-eighth. He is a former New Zealand Schools representative and was captain of both the King's College 1st XV and its 1st XI cricket team. He made his Auckland debut after coming off the bench in a 59–16 win over Manawatu at Eden Park, contributing two conversions.

Simon Hickey had signed for the Hurricanes (rugby union) for the 2021 season, however ruptured his ACL during pre season ending his season prematurely. This led to him being signed by the Crusaders (rugby union) for 2022.
