= Jade Te Rure =

- Born: 18 June 1993 (age 33) Palmerston North, New Zealand
- Height: 1.80 m (5 ft 11 in)
- Weight: 85 kg (13 st 5 lb)
- School: Palmerston North Boys' High School

Rugby union career
- Position: Fly-half
- Current team: Yorkshire Carnegie
Amateur team(s)
Years	Team	Apps	(Points)
2013–14, 17	Kia Toa		
Senior career
Years	Team	Apps	(Points)
2014–16	Edinburgh	4	(10)
2018–	Yorkshire Carnegie		
Provincial / State sides
Years	Team	Apps	(Points)
2013–14, 17–	Manawatu	34	(129)
- Correct as of 14 October 2018
International career
Years	Team	Apps	(Points)
2013	New Zealand U20	3	(8)
- Correct as of 2 February 2015

Jade Te Rure (born 18 June 1993) is a New Zealand rugby union player who is currently signed for Yorkshire Carnegie in the English RFU Championship have previously played for Manawatu in the Mitre 10 Cup. He plays as a fly-half.

He previously played for Edinburgh in the Pro12.

Scottish-qualified, through his Edinburgh-born grandmother, Te Rure has played in the capital before as part of a touring under-18 side.

He played for New Zealand under-20s in the 2013 IRB Junior World Championship in France.
