= George Moala =

NZ & Tonga international rugby union player

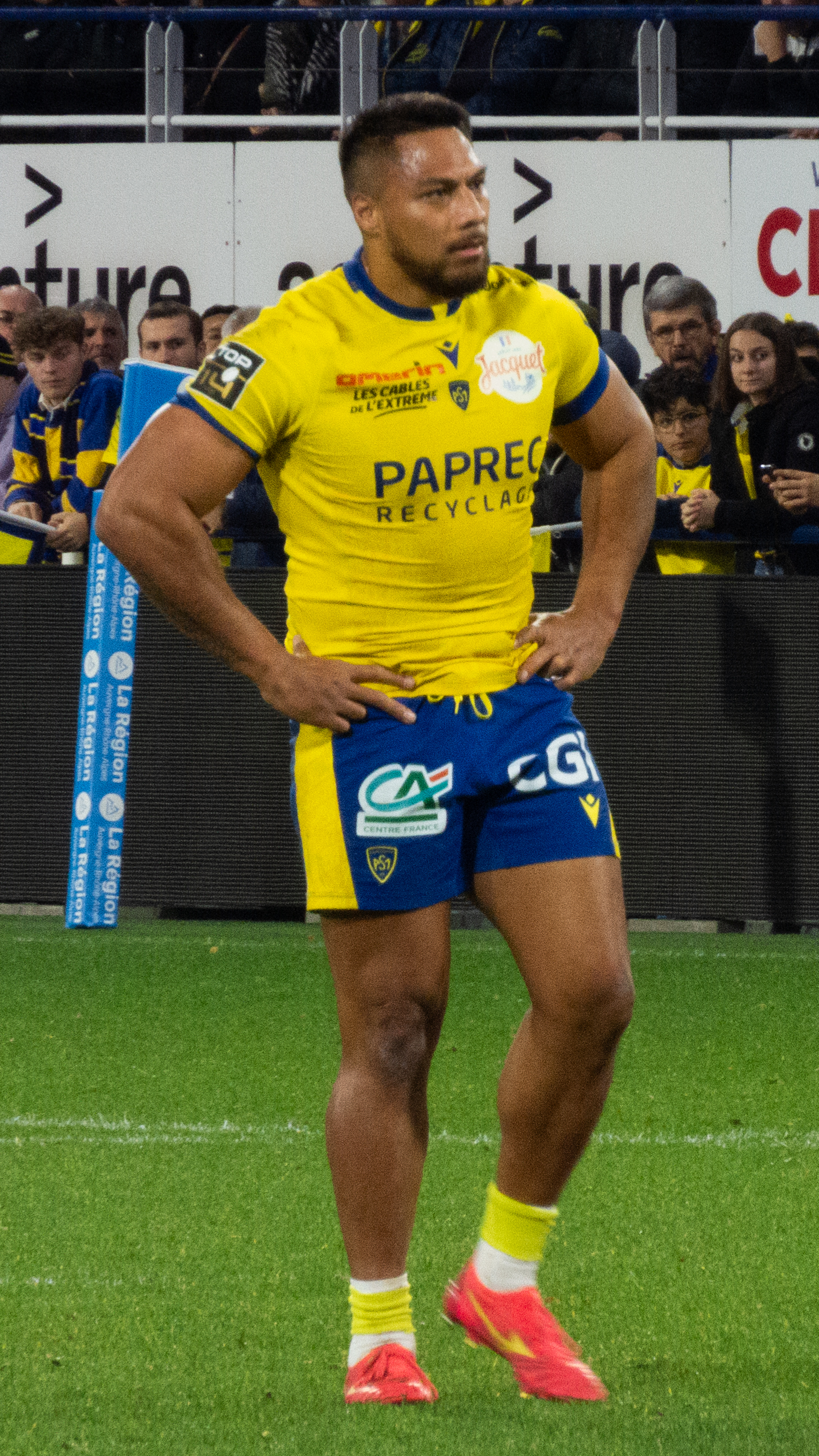
- Born: 5 November 1990 (age 36) Auckland, New Zealand
- Height: 1.88 m (6 ft 2 in)
- Weight: 99 kg (218 lb; 15 st 8 lb)
- School: Tamaki College

Rugby union career
- Position(s): Centre, Wing
- Current team: Clermont
Senior career
Years	Team	Apps	(Points)
2011–2017	Auckland	53	(150)
2012–2018	Blues	74	(110)
2018–	Clermont	105	(175)
- Correct as of 28 August 2023
International career
Years	Team	Apps	(Points)
2009–2010	Tonga U20	10	(5)
2015–2016	New Zealand	4	(15)
2022–	Tonga	5	(0)
- Correct as of 28 August 2023

George Moala (born 5 November 1990) is a professional rugby union player who plays as a centre for Top 14 club Clermont. Born in New Zealand, he represents Tonga at international level after qualifying on ancestry grounds.

== Early life ==
Moala attended Tamaki College where he was prominent in 2008 inter-collegiate rugby season, including scoring a stunning try against New Zealand rugby powerhouse school Auckland Grammar School. In 2010, Moala was selected in the Auckland Under 20 squad.

== Club career ==
In 2011, Moala was selected for Auckland, in which he played 10 games. In November 2011, Moala was selected in the Blues squad for the 2012 Super Rugby season. He was a standout player for the Blues in 2013, covering left wing for most of the season. In Moala's third season with the franchise he started the year by scoring tries in games against the Crusaders and the Cheetahs. However, due to Francis Saili's recovery from an injury and Ma'a Nonu making it back into the squad, he regained his preferred position at left wing.

Having made countless appearances for the Blues in 2015, he established himself at inside centre. His aggressive playing style, attacking flair and upper-body strength give him the potential to become one of the Blues' most consistent player in years to come.

Moala was the stand-out player in the Super Rugby 2015 season, notching up approximately 60 tackle busts, covering 900m with ball in hand and continuously being a threat to the opposition. In the final match of the 2015 season against the Highlanders, former All-Black Jeff Wilson compared Moala to Ma'a Nonu, due to similarities in physic and playing style but also the fact that Moala, like Nonu, originated playing on the wing and then transitioned into centre.

On 22 December 2017, Moala left New Zealand to sign for top French side Clermont Auvergne in the Top 14 competition on a three-year deal from the 2018–19 season.

== International career ==
In 2010, Moala represented Tonga in the IRB Junior World Championship. By July 2015, Moala impressed All Blacks selectors' with an impressive Super Rugby campaign and debuted for New Zealand as wing, in a historic one-off test match in Apia, Samoa. He scored New Zealand's only try in the match that ended 25–16. Despite a strong All Blacks debut and consistent performance's in the ITM Cup, Moala was not included in the 31-man squad for Rugby World Cup 2015.

Moala made his All Blacks debut on the wing against Samoa on 8 July 2015, scoring his maiden try.

Moala, who wasn't even part of the initial squad to face Wales, started at centre in the 3rd test against Wales in Dunedin on 25 June 2016. He starred in the midfield during the 46–6 victory, making several line breaks and scoring a try in the 34th minute diving over from close range after a wheeled scrum. He subsequently suffered an elbow injury during the game, ruling him out for the Auckland Blues for up to four weeks.

== Personal life ==
=== Assault ===
Moala was found guilty of injuring with intent after a bar fight in 2012. Prosecutor Josh Shaw said at the trial of Moala and his brother Siua for assault at a Karangahape Road, Auckland nightclub in December 2012, that Moala's victim was described as being "on the ground with blood pouring away as blows continued to come." George Moala had continued to attack Mr Matoka even after bar security tried to lead the victim to safety. He was discharged without conviction and ordered to pay $2500 reparation to the victim.
