= Maadi Cup =

Rowing regatta in New Zealand

The Maadi Cup is the prize for the New Zealand Secondary Schools Boys' Under 18 Rowing Eights. More colloquially, it is the name given to the New Zealand Secondary Schools Rowing Regatta, at which the Maadi Cup is raced. The regatta is the largest school sports event in the Southern Hemisphere, with over 2,087 rowers from 113 secondary schools participating in 2023 The regatta is held annually in late March, alternating between the country's two main rowing venues: Lake Karapiro near Cambridge (odd years), and Lake Ruataniwha near Twizel (even years).

The top prizes at the regatta are the Maadi Cup, Springbok Shield, Levin Jubilee Cup, Dawn Cup and Star Trophy. The fastest time recorded in the Maadi Cup event was by St Bede's College in 2023 with a time of 5:42.17, which is also the overall record time for the Boys' Under 18 Eight in New Zealand. This was also the closest race for the Maadi Cup in the event's history, with St Bede's College winning by 0.06 seconds over Hamilton Boys' High School. Also in the same year was the fastest time recorded in the Levin Jubilee Cup event by Rangi Ruru Girls' School with a time of 6:27.68.

== History ==
During World War II, members of the 2nd NZEF based at Maadi Camp in Egypt competed in regattas on the Nile against local Egyptian rowing clubs. At a regatta held on 20 November 1943 the Maadi Camp Rowing Club "Kiwi" oarsmen beat the Cairo River Club by 11 points to six to win the Freyberg Cup, which they then gifted to the competitors. In return, as a token of friendship, Youssef Baghat presented the Kiwis with a cup. Youssef Baghat's cup was offered to the NZARA (now NZRA) as a trophy for an annual boys' eight-oared race between secondary schools and was brought to New Zealand at the end of the war.

Renamed the Maadi Cup it was first raced for in 1947 at Wanganui where it was won by Mount Albert Grammar School, who beat Sacred Heart College by a half-length. Four boats took part in the original race, with Allan Tong a member of Wanganui Technical College; he would later compete in the New Zealand at the 1956 Summer Olympics in Melbourne, Australia, in the coxed four. The fourth boat was from St Augustine's College. The Maadi Cup gained its native timber pyramid shaped base from Mt Albert Grammar's woodwork master and first rowing coach, Jack Jenkin, in 1951. Only 17 schools have ever won the cup, with Wanganui Collegiate School the most successful, having won it 17 times.

Members for the 2nd NZEF competed in rowing regattas and won races run by the Cairo River Club until they were shipped back to New Zealand at the end of the War.

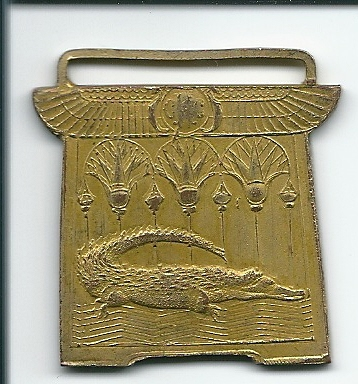
Regates Du Caire – Cairo River Club Rowing Medal 1945

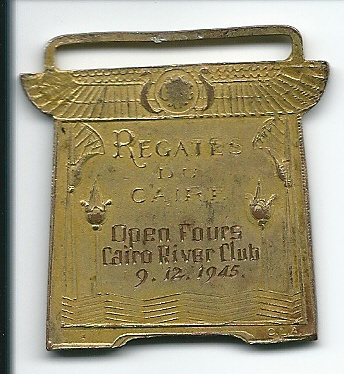
Regates Du Caires – Cairo River Club – Open Fours Rowing Medal – 9 December 1945

== Major event wins ==
Schools that have won the Maadi Cup:

As of the 2026 event, 17 schools have won the Maadi Cup.

Rank	Name	Titles	Years
1	Whanganui Collegiate School	17	1952, 1963, 1964, 1965, 1966, 1967, 1968, 1969, 1971, 1973, 1974, 1977, 1985, 1986, 2000, 2001, 2004
2	Christ's College	13	1988, 1989, 1990, 1993, 1995, 1996, 1998, 1999, 2006, 2012, 2016, 2018, 2021
3	Hamilton Boys' High School	12	1970, 1987, 2005, 2007, 2008, 2009, 2010, 2013, 2014, 2015, 2022, 2024
4	Mt Albert Grammar School	8	1947, 1951, 1954, 1955, 1956, 1957, 1958, 1961
5	Tauranga Boys' College	7	1978, 1979, 1980, 1981, 1982, 1994, 1997
6=	Westlake Boys' High School	4	1976, 1983, 1984, 2025
6=	King's College	4	1953, 1959, 1960, 2026
8=	Wanganui Technical School	2	1949, 1950
8=	Auckland Grammar School	2	1992, 2011
8=	St Paul's Collegiate	2	2002, 2003
8=	St Bede's College	2	1991, 2023
12=	Fraser High School	1	1975
12=	Sacred Heart College	1	1948
12=	New Plymouth Boys' High School	1	1962
12=	Whanganui High School	1	1972
12=	St Andrew's College	1	2017
12=	Christchurch Boys' High School	1	2019

Springbok Shield (BU184+)

The Springbok Shield is the prize for the boys' under 18 coxed four. It was instigated in 1964 by Mr Cecil Purvis who was visiting South Africa at the time and met with members of the Johannesburg youth rowing community. After much discussion the Springbok Shield eventuated. The Shield is made from segments of all the woods from South Africa and was first rowed for in 1965 when it was won by Hamilton Boys' High School.

As of the 2026 event, 19 schools have won the Springbok Shield.

Rank	Name	Titles	Years
1	Hamilton Boys' High School	17	1965, 1969, 1971, 1972, 1973, 1974, 1976, 1995, 2005, 2006, 2007, 2008, 2009, 2010, 2013, 2018, 2024
2	Tauranga Boys' College	8	1979, 1980, 1981, 1984, 1986, 1987, 1994, 1997
3	Christ's College	6	1988, 1989, 1990, 1996, 1998, 2016
4	Westlake Boys' High School	5	1982, 1991, 1993, 2002, 2025
5	Whanganui Collegiate School	4	1966, 1977, 1985, 2004
6	St Paul's Collegiate	3	2000, 2003, 2015
7=	Fairfield College	2	1968, 1970
7=	St Andrew's College	2	1983, 2017
7=	Christchurch Boys' High School	2	1999, 2019
7=	Auckland Grammar School	2	2011, 2021
7=	King's College	2	1992, 2026
12=	Rongotai College	1	1967
12=	Whanganui High School	1	1975
12=	Otumoetai College	1	1978
12=	Wellington College	1	2001
12=	Marlborough Boys' College	1	2012
12=	Napier Boys' High School	1	2014
12=	Mt Albert Grammar School	1	2022
12=	St Bede's College	1	2023

Levin 75th Jubilee Cup (GU188+)

The Levin Cup is awarded to the winner of the girls' under 18 eight. In 1981 the Maadi Regatta was held on Lake Horowhenua. That year the Levin Borough Council was holding its 75th Jubilee. The mayor, Jack Bolderson, decided that a fitting memorial would be for a cup for the girls senior eight. The inaugural winner was Wanganui Girls College.

As of the 2026 event, 11 schools have won the Levin 75th Jubilee Cup.

Rank	Name	Titles	Years
1	Rangi Ruru Girls' School	18	1991, 1992, 1993, 1994, 1995, 1996, 1997, 1998, 1999, 2000, 2005, 2007, 2008, 2009, 2010, 2021, 2022, 2023
2	St Margaret's College	8	2001, 2003, 2004, 2012, 2013, 2015, 2019, 2025
3	Waikato Diocesan School	4	2002, 2011, 2014, 2026
4=	Whanganui Girls' College	3	1981, 1984, 1985
4=	Marlborough Girls' College	3	1986, 1987, 1988
6=	Whanganui High School	2	1982, 1983
6=	Westlake Girls' High School	2	1989, 1990
6=	Diocesan School for Girls	2	2016, 2017
9=	Wanganui Collegiate School	1	2006
9=	St Peter's School, Cambridge	1	2018
9=	Christchurch Girls' High School	1	2024

Dawn Cup (GU184+)

The Dawn Cup is awarded to the winner of the girls' under 18 coxed four. At the Maadi Regatta of 1980 held on the Wairoa River, a cup was donated by Noel Lynch for the Girls Under 18 Four. On finals day, officials were unable to keep to time and by dark, the Boys Under 17 Eight and the Girls Under 18 Four had not been rowed. These races were then scheduled to be held at 6:30 am Sunday morning (no daylight saving). Because of this, Noel Lynch and Enoka Macdonald decided this trophy should be called the Dawn Cup and it was first won by Queen Charlotte College.

As of the 2026 event, 16 schools have won the Dawn Cup.

Rank	Name	Titles	Years
1	Rangi Ruru Girls' School	18	1990, 1992, 1993, 1994, 1995, 1997, 1998, 1999, 2001, 2003, 2007, 2008, 2009, 2010, 2022, 2023, 2025, 2026
2	Westlake Girls' High School	4	1989, 1991, 2002, 2014
3=	Whanganui High School	3	1982, 1983, 1985
3=	St Margaret's College	3	2004, 2006, 2013
3=	St Peter's School, Cambridge	3	2011, 2012, 2018
3=	Waikato Diocesan School	3	2015, 2019, 2024
7=	Marlborough Girls' College	2	1987, 1988
7=	Gisborne Girls' High School	2	1996, 2000
9=	Queen Charlotte College	1	1980
9=	Te Awamutu College	1	1981
9=	Nayland College	1	1984
9=	Whanganui Girls' College	1	1986
9=	Sacred Heart Girls College	1	2005
9=	Diocesan School for Girls	1	2016
9=	St Paul's Collegiate	1	2017
9=	Christchurch Girls' High School	1	2021

Star Trophy

Since 1997, the Star Trophy is the prize awarded to the top overall school at the Regatta, and therefore come to denote the top rowing school in New Zealand. The Star trophy was donated by Star Boating Club, which it is named after. The award is determined on a points basis: schools winning events get 5 points, runners up get 3 points, and third place-getters get one point.

As of the 2026 event, 7 schools have won the Star Trophy

Rank	Name	Titles	Years
1	Rangi Ruru Girls' School	10	1997, 1998, 1999, 2000, 2006, 2007, 2010, 2021, 2022, 2023
2	Hamilton Boys' High School	8	2005, 2008, 2009, 2013, 2014, 2015, 2017, 2024
3	St Margaret's College	4	2001, 2002, 2003, 2004
4	St Peter's School, Cambridge	3	2012, 2016, 2018
5	Waikato Diocesan School	2	2011, 2026
6=	Christchurch Boys' High School	1	2019
6=	Kings College	1	2025

Executive Trophy

Since 2003, the Executive Trophy is the prize awarded to the top overall school in sweep-oar events (i.e. pairs, fours and eights) at the Regatta.

As of the 2026 event, 5 schools have won the Executive Trophy.

Rank	Name	Titles	Years
1	Hamilton Boys' High School	11	2005, 2006, 2007, 2008, 2009, 2013, 2014, 2015, 2017, 2018, 2019
2	Rangi Ruru Girls' School	6	2010, 2016, 2021, 2022, 2023, 2024
3	St Margaret's College	3	2003, 2004, 2012
4	Waikato Diocesan School	2	2011, 2026
5	Kings College	1	2025

Presidents Scull

Since 2003, the Presidents Scull is the prize awarded to the top overall school in sculling events (i.e. singles, doubles and quads) at the Regatta.

As of the 2026 event, 13 schools have won the Presidents Scull.

Rank	Name	Titles	Years
1	St Peter's School, Cambridge	8.5	2010, 2011, 2012 (tie), 2014, 2015, 2016, 2017, 2018, 2019
2	Wakatipu High School	4.5	2022, 2023, 2024 (tie), 2025, 2026
3	Kavanaugh College	1.5	2012 (tie), 2013
4=	St Margaret's College	1	2003
4=	Queen Charlotte College	1	2004
4=	Whanganui High School	1	2005
4=	Marlborough Girls' College	1	2006
4=	Roncalli College	1	2008
4=	James Hargest College	1	2009
4=	Dunstan High School	1	2021
11=	Nelson College	0.5	2007 (tie)
11=	Hauraki Plains College	0.5	2007 (tie)
11=	Cashmere High School	0.5	2024 (tie)

== Eligibility ==
Rowers and coxswains in the Maadi Cup must be full-time students (at least 0.8 FTE) at a registered New Zealand school, and must be studying at secondary level (Year 9 or above). They must also have a satisfactory school attendance record, in the opinion of the school's principal, in order to participate.

The regatta is split into four age classification: under 15, under 16, under 17, and under 18. Only students who are under the specified age at 1 January preceding the regatta may compete in that class. For example, a student who is aged 15 on 1 January may compete in the under 16, under 17 and under 18 classifications, but not the under 15 classification.

Females may cox male boats, and vice versa. The minimum weight for coxswains is 55 kg for all events at the regatta. Lightweight events used to be part of the regatta but were banned in 2016 following health concerns of the teenage athletes.

In mid-2007, the New Zealand Secondary Schools Sports Council introduced a quota system restricting the number of new-to-school and international students a school can field at national championships, including the Maadi Cup, in an aim to reduce top sporting schools "poaching" athletes from other schools. A new-to-school student is a student who has enrolled at the school in the 24 months prior to the event, excluding students who enrolled at the school in Year 9 or below. An international student is a student who is not a New Zealand or Australian citizen, or the holder of a New Zealand resident visa or domestic-endorsed student visa. For eights, no more than three crew members that are classified as a new-to-school or international students are permitted per boat, with no more than two crew members being international students. For all other events, no more than one crew member that is classified as a new-to-school or international student is permitted per boat.

At a special general meeting held on 24 January 2025, the New Zealand Secondary School Rowing Associations (NZSSRA) voted to ban year 14 rowers from competing at Maadi regattas, unless an exemption has been granted.

== Events ==
As of 2026

	Under 15		Under 16		Under 17		Under 18		Under 18 Novice	
	Girls	Boys	Girls	Boys	Girls	Boys	Girls	Boys	Girls	Boys
Single scull (1x)			•	•	•	•	•	•		
Pair (2−)					•	•	•	•		
Double scull (2x)	•	•	•	•	•	•	•	•	•	•
Coxed four (4+)	•	•	•	•	•	•	•	•	•	•
Coxed quad scull (4x+)	•	•	•	•	•	•	•	•	•	•
Eight (8+)	•	•	•	•	•	•	•	•	•	•
Octuple scull (8x+)	•	•								

== Participation ==
The Maadi Cup regatta regularly has over 2000 competitors from over 100 schools competing

Year	Venue	Competitors	Schools
2003	Karapiro	1853	107
2004	Ruataniwha	1752	98
2005	Karapiro	2040	104
2006	Ruataniwha	1849	101
2007	Karapiro	1955	105
2008	Ruataniwha	1716	105
2009	Karapiro	1870	106
2010	Ruataniwha	1819	114
2011	Karapiro	1888	122
2012	Ruataniwha	1692	118
2013	Karapiro	2020	120
2014	Ruataniwha	2083	125
2015	Karapiro	2155	120
2016	Ruataniwha	2112	119
2017	Karapiro	2137	126
2018	Ruataniwha	2090	120
2019	Karapiro	2152	129
2020	Cancelled due to COVID-19 coronavirus pandemic		
2021	Karapiro	2432	123
2022	Ruataniwha	1306	95
2023	Karapiro	2087	113
2024	Ruataniwha	2112	104
2025	Karapiro	2236	116
2026	Ruataniwha	2176	129

== Major event winners ==
=== Major events ===
Year	Venue	Maadi Cup (B U18 8+)	Springbok Shield (B U18 4+)	Levin 75th Jubilee Cup (G U18 8+)	Dawn Cup (G U18 4+)
1947	Whanganui River	Mount Albert Grammar School			
1948	Westhaven Marina	Sacred Heart College; 2nd: Mount Albert Grammar School; 3rd: Wanganui Collegiate School			
1949	Whanganui	Wanganui Technical School; 2nd: Wanganui Collegiate School; 3rd: Sacred Heart College			
1950		Wanganui Technical School			
1951		Mount Albert Grammar School			
1952		Wanganui Collegiate School			
1953		King's College			
1954		Mount Albert Grammar School; 2nd:: Seddon Memorial Technical College; 3rd:			
1955		Mount Albert Grammar School			
1956		Mount Albert Grammar School			
1957	Auckland	Mount Albert Grammar School; 2nd: Whakatane High School; 3rd: King Edward Technical College			
1958		Mount Albert Grammar School			
1959		King's College			
1960		King's College			
1961		Mount Albert Grammar School			
1962		New Plymouth Boys' High School			
1963	Whanganui	Wanganui Collegiate School; 2nd: Fairfield College; 3rd:			
1964		Wanganui Collegiate School			
1965	Oriental Bay	Wanganui Collegiate School	Hamilton Boys High School		
1966		Wanganui Collegiate School	Wanganui Collegiate School		
1967		Wanganui Collegiate School	Rongotai College		
1968		Wanganui Collegiate School	Fairfield College		
1969		Wanganui Collegiate School	Hamilton Boys High School; 2nd: Fairfield College; 3rd:		
1970		Hamilton Boys High School	Fairfield College		
1971		Wanganui Collegiate School	Hamilton Boys High School		
1972		Whanganui High School	Hamilton Boys High School		
1973	Karapiro	Wanganui Collegiate School	Hamilton Boys High School		
1974	Whanganui	Wanganui Collegiate School; 2nd: Hamilton Boys' High School; 3rd: Westlake Boys High School	Hamilton Boys High School		
1975	Kerrs Reach	Fraser High School; 2nd: Westlake Boys High School; 3rd: St Bede's College	Whanganui High School		
1976	Karapiro	Westlake Boys High School; 2nd: St Bede's College; 3rd: Fairfield College	Hamilton Boys High School		
1977	Whanganui	Wanganui Collegiate School; 2nd: Westlake Boys High School; 3rd:	Wanganui Collegiate School		
1978	Karapiro	Tauranga Boys' College	Otumoetai College		
1979	Lake Waihola	Tauranga Boys' College; 2nd: Kings' College; 3rd: Westlake Boys High School	Tauranga Boys' College		
1980	Wairoa River	Tauranga Boys' College	Tauranga Boys' College		Queen Charlotte College
1981	Lake Horowhenua	Tauranga Boys' College	Tauranga Boys' College	Whanganui Girls' College	Te Awamutu College
1982	Wairoa River	Tauranga Boys' College; 2nd: Westlake Boys High School; 3rd:	Westlake Boys' High School	Whanganui High School	Whanganui High School
1983	Karapiro	Westlake Boys High School; 2nd: Hamilton Boys' High School; 3rd:	St Andrew's College; 2nd: Tauranga Boys' College; 3rd:	Whanganui High School	Whanganui High School
1984	Karapiro	Westlake Boys High School; 2nd: Saint Kentigern College; 3rd: Kings' College	Tauranga Boys' College; 2nd: 3rd: Westlake Boys High School	Whanganui Girls' College	Nayland College
1985	Ruataniwha	Wanganui Collegiate School; 2nd: Westlake Boys High School; 3rd: Marlborough Boys' College	Wanganui Collegiate School; 2nd: Wanganui High School; 3rd: Westlake Boys High School	Whanganui Girls' College	Whanganui High School
1986		Wanganui Collegiate School; 2nd: Tauranga Boys' College; 3rd: Westlake Boys High School	Tauranga Boys' College; 2nd: Westlake Boys High School; 3rd:	Marlborough Girls' College	Whanganui Girls' College
1987	Karapiro	Hamilton Boys High School (5:51:80); 2nd: Christ's College, Christchurch; 3rd: St Kentigern College	Tauranga Boys' College	Marlborough Girls' College	Marlborough Girls' College
1988	Ruataniwha	Christ's College	Christ's College; 2nd: Christ's College #2; 3rd: Westlake Boys High School	Marlborough Girls' College	Marlborough Girls' College
1989	Karapiro	Christ's College	Christ's College	Westlake Girls' High School	Westlake Girls' High School
1990	Ruataniwha	Christ's College; 2nd: Westlake Boys High School; 3rd:	Christ's College	Westlake Girls' High School	Rangi Ruru Girls' School
1991	Karapiro	St Bede's College; 2nd: Westlake Boys High School; 3rd:	Westlake Boys High School; 2nd: Christ's College; 3rd:	Rangi Ruru Girls' School	Westlake Girls' High School
1992	Ruataniwha	Auckland Grammar School (6:59.50)	King's College	Rangi Ruru Girls' School	Rangi Ruru Girls' School
1993	Karapiro	Christ's College; 2nd: Westlake Boys High School; 3rd:	Westlake Boys' High School	Rangi Ruru Girls' School	Rangi Ruru Girls' School
1994	Ruataniwha	Tauranga Boys' College	Tauranga Boys' College; 2nd: Westlake Boys High School; 3rd:	Rangi Ruru Girls' School	Rangi Ruru Girls' School
1995	Karapiro	Christ's College (6:30.82); 2nd: Tauranga Boys' College (6:36.93); 3rd: Wanganui Collegiate School (6:38.02)	Hamilton Boys' High School (7:06.60); 2nd: Christ's College (7:12.26); 3rd: Tauranga Boys' College (7:14.24)	Rangi Ruru Girls' School (7:18.69); 2nd: Takapuna Grammar School (7:26.76); 3rd: Rangi Ruru Girls School #2 (7:27.04)	Rangi Ruru Girls' School (7:58.13); 2nd: Rangi Ruru Girls School #2 (8:02.42); 3rd: St Margaret's College (8:05.44)
1996	Ruataniwha	Christ's College (6:09.84); 2nd: Tauranga Boys' College (6:10.69); 3rd: Auckland Grammar School (6:15.33)	Christ's College (6:43.51); 2nd: Tauranga Boys' College (6:49.01); 3rd: Saint Kentigern College (6:52.85)	Rangi Ruru Girls' School (6:58.31); 2nd: Gisborne Girls' High School (7:01.37); 3rd: St Margaret's College (7:06.42)	Gisborne Girls' High School (7:28.24); 2nd: Marlborough Girls' College(7:29.89); 3rd: Rangi Ruru Girls' School (7:34.73)
1997	Karapiro	Tauranga Boys' College (6:15.66); 2nd: King's College, Auckland (6:18.41); 3rd: St Paul's Collegiate School (6:20.60)	Tauranga Boys' College (6:57.80); 2nd: Saint Kentigern College (7:03.57); 3rd: St Paul's Collegiate School (7:11.59)	Rangi Ruru Girls' School (7:12.14); 2nd: St Margaret's College (7:23.74); 3rd: Wanganui Collegiate School (7:29.34)	Rangi Ruru Girls' School (8:10.80); 2nd: Wanganui Collegiate School (8:19.45); 3rd: Karamu High School (8:22.47)
1998	Ruataniwha	Christ's College (6:00.14); 2nd: Christchurch Boys' High School (6:06.08); 3rd: Tauranga Boys' College (6:08.22)	Christ's College (6:37.78); 2nd: Tauranga Boys' College (6:42.39); 3rd: Christchurch Boys' High School (6:46.34)	Rangi Ruru Girls' School (6:52); 2nd: St Margaret's College (7:02); 3rd: Wanganui Collegiate School (7:04)	Rangi Ruru Girls' School (7:32.26); 2nd: St Margaret's College (7:40.11); 3rd: Rangi Ruru Girls School #2 (7:44.73)
1999	Karapiro	Christ's College (6:03.71); 2nd: Christchurch Boys' High School (6:04.70); 3rd: Wanganui Collegiate School (6:08.60)	Christchurch Boys' High School (6:45.14); 2nd: St Paul's Collegiate School(6:47.94); 3rd: Westlake Boys High School (6:52.45)	Rangi Ruru Girls' School (6:49.80); 2nd: Gisborne Girls' High School (6:50.90); 3rd: Rangi Ruru Girls School #2 (6:53.15)	Rangi Ruru Girls' School (7:43.52); 2nd: Rangi Ruru Girls School #2 (7:46.10); 3rd: Columba College (7:48.24)
2000	Ruataniwha	Wanganui Collegiate School (6:24.86); 2nd: Christ's College (6:26.73); 3rd: St Paul's Collegiate School (6:30.03)	St Paul's Collegiate School (6:40.79); 2nd: Wanganui Collegiate School (6:45.90); 3rd: Auckland Grammar School (6:50.18)	Rangi Ruru Girls' School 1 (7:17.32); 2nd: St Margaret's College (7:22.98); 3rd: Rangi Ruru Girls' School 2 (7:30.72)	Gisborne Girls' High School (7:30.55); 2nd: St Margaret's College (7:32.09); 3rd: Rangi Ruru Girls' School (7:32.11)
2001	Karapiro	Wanganui Collegiate School (6:00.76); 2nd: Christ's College (6:02.29); 3rd: King's College (6:06.25)	Wellington College (6:44.09); 2nd: Auckland Grammar School (6:46.78); 3rd: Wanganui Collegiate School (6:49.03)	St Margaret's College (6:47.33); 2nd: Rangi Ruru Girls' School (6:50.90); 3rd: Marlborough Girls' College (6:52.38)	Rangi Ruru Girls' School (7:37.76); 2nd: St Margaret's College (7:45.61); 3rd: Marlborough Girls' College (7:49.57)
2002	Ruataniwha	St Paul's Collegiate School (6:43.59); 2nd: Wanganui Collegiate School (6:54.03); 3rd: Westlake Boys' High School (6:54.57)	Westlake Boys' High School (8:07.24); 2nd: Christ's College (8:11.09); 3rd: St Paul's Collegiate School (8:30.04)	Waikato Diocesan School (7:39.07); 2nd: St Margaret's College (7:39.89); 3rd: Rangi Ruru Girls' School (7:46.26)	Westlake Girls' High School (9:27.72); 2nd: Marlborough Girls' College (9:29.20); 3rd: Diocesan School for Girls (9:43.81)
2003	Karapiro	St Paul's Collegiate School (6:12.12); 2nd: Wanganui Collegiate School (6:15.20); 3rd: Auckland Grammar School (6:18.93)	St Paul's Collegiate School (6:34.58); 2nd: Auckland Grammar School (6:41.56); 3rd: Otago Boys' High School (6:43.75)	St Margaret's College (7:10:01); 2nd: Baradene College (7:12.48); 3rd: Gisborne Girls' High School (7:18.36)	Rangi Ruru Girls' School (7:40.50); 2nd: St Margaret's College (7:43.19); 3rd: Gisborne Girls' High School (7:43.69)
2004	Ruataniwha	Wanganui Collegiate School (6:34.22); 2nd: Kings' College (6:37.51); 3rd: Christ's College (6:38.28)	Wanganui Collegiate School (7:54.84); 2nd: Auckland Grammar School (7:55.01); 3rd: Christ's College (7:56.98)	St Margaret's College (7:32.21); 2nd: Rangi Ruru Girls' School (7:33.19); 3rd: Sacred Heart Girls' College (7:38.36)	St Margaret's College (7:45.61); 2nd: Rangi Ruru Girls' School 2 (7:58.68); 3rd: Rangi Ruru Girls' School 1 (8:04.94)
2005	Karapiro	Hamilton Boys' High School (5:53:17); 2nd: Wanganui Collegiate School (5:59.38); 3rd: St Kentigern College (6:01.85)	Hamilton Boys' High School (6:30.79); 2nd: Wanganui Collegiate School (6:37.22); 3rd: Westlake Boys' High School (6:45.68)	Rangi Ruru Girls' School (6:47:16); 2nd: Sacred Heart Girls' College (6:49.25); 3rd: St Margaret's College (6:52.82)	Sacred Heart Girls' College (7:21.32); 2nd: Rangi Ruru Girls' School (7:29.18); 3rd: Gisborne Girls' High School (7:32.53)
2006	Ruataniwha	Christ's College (5:56:48); 2nd: Kings' College (5:57.41); 3rd: Hamilton Boys' High School (5:58.68)	Hamilton Boys' High School (6:45.07); 2nd: Wanganui Collegiate School (6:50.35); 3rd: St Kentigern College (6:50.62)	Whanganui Collegiate School (6:41.18); 2nd: Rangi Ruru Girls' School (6:42.99); 3rd: Sacred Heart Girls' College (6:50.08)	St Margaret's College (7:38.46); 2nd: Gisborne Girls' High School (7:41.81); 3rd: Wanganui Collegiate School (7:44.62)
2007	Karapiro	Hamilton Boys' High School (6:22.50); 2nd: Christ's College (6:30.96); 3rd: Kings' College (6:37.11)	Hamilton Boys' High School (6:26.40); 2nd: Christ's College (6:32.01); 3rd: Marlborough Boys' College (6:37.12)	Rangi Ruru Girls' School (7:15:19); 2nd: Nelson College for Girls (7:19.26); 3rd: Wanganui Collegiate School (7:20.96)	Rangi Ruru Girls' School (7:25.44); 2nd: St Margaret's College (7:25.83); 3rd: Wanganui Collegiate School (7:30.28)
2008	Ruataniwha	Hamilton Boys' High School (5:54.71); 2nd: Kings' College (5:58.17); 3rd: Wanganui Collegiate School (6:00.37)	Hamilton Boys' High School 1 (6:42.44); 2nd: Wanganui Collegiate School (6:51.88); 3rd: Hamilton Boys' High School 2 (6:52.76)	Rangi Ruru Girls' School (6:39:63); 2nd: Wanganui Collegiate School (6:42.05); 3rd: Nelson College for Girls (6:45.90)	Rangi Ruru Girls' School (7:28.52); 2nd: Wanganui Collegiate School (7:30.44); 3rd: Waikato Diocesan School (7:35.93)
2009	Karapiro	Hamilton Boys' High School (5:53.21); 2nd: Westlake Boys' High School (5:53.76); 3rd: Christ's College (5:58.37)	Hamilton Boys' High School 1 (6:50.39); 2nd: Westlake Boys' High School (6:52.05); 3rd: Hamilton Boys' High School 2 (6:52.11)	Rangi Ruru Girls' School (6:37.58); 2nd: Waikato Diocesan School (6:43.48); 3rd: Wanganui Collegiate School (6:44.17)	Rangi Ruru Girls' School (7:35.83); 2nd: Wanganui Collegiate School (7:42.98); 3rd: Marlborough Girls' College (7:45.91)
2010	Ruataniwha	Hamilton Boys' High School (5:55.64); 2nd: Westlake Boys' High School (5:57.83); 3rd: Auckland Grammar School (6:02.52)	Hamilton Boys' High School (6:51.96); 2nd: Westlake Boys' High School (6:53.25); 3rd: St Paul's Collegiate School (7:00.06)	Rangi Ruru Girls' School (6:42.11); 2nd: Westlake Girls' High School (6:48.53); 3rd: Marlborough Girls' College (6:48.96)	Rangi Ruru Girls' School (7:41.84); 2nd: Marlborough Girls' College (7:46.13); 3rd: Sacred Heart Girls' College (7:49.73)
2011	Karapiro	Auckland Grammar School (5:55.72); 2nd: Christ's College (5:58.31); 3rd: Westlake Boys' High School (6:00.96)	Auckland Grammar School (6:36.99); 2nd: Napier Boys' High School (6:39.74); 3rd: Marlborough Boys' College (6:42.79)	Waikato Diocesan School (6:46.40); 2nd: Christchurch Girls' High School (6:52.73); 3rd: St Kevin's College (6:54.84)	St Peter's School (7:48.07); 2nd: Christchurch Girls' High School (7:53.65); 3rd: Wellington Girls' College (7:54.06)
2012	Ruataniwha	Christ's College (5:57.41); 2nd: Auckland Grammar School (5:58.11); 3rd: Westlake Boys' High School (5:59.43)	Marlborough Boys' College (6:26.76); 2nd: Auckland Grammar School (6:29.40); 3rd: Westlake Boys' High School (6:31.21)	St Margaret's College (6:46.54); 2nd: Waikato Diocesan School (6:48.65); 3rd: St Peter's School (6:51.52)	St Peter's School (7:20.15); 2nd: Marlborough Girls' College (7:53.65); 3rd: Waikato Diocesan School (7:25.82)
2013	Karapiro	Hamilton Boys' High School (5:54.71); 2nd: Napier Boys' High School (5:54.95); 3rd: Westlake Boys' High School (5:58.47)	Hamilton Boys' High School (6:31.71); 2nd: Auckland Grammar School (6:32.26); 3rd: Napier Boys' High School (6:34.35)	St Margaret's College (6:43.23); 2nd: Waikato Diocesan School (6:47.84); 3rd: Craighead Diocesan School (6:51.14)	St Margaret's College (7:17.94); 2nd: Waikato Diocesan School (7:24.22); 3rd: Craighead Diocesan School (7:24.94)
2014	Ruataniwha	Hamilton Boys' High School (5:55.84); 2nd: St Bede's College (5:57.99); 3rd: Napier Boys' High School (5:58.52)	Napier Boys' High School (6:49.53); 2nd: Hamilton Boys' High School (6:54.61); 3rd: Christ's College (6:57.91)	Waikato Diocesan School (6:51.43); 2nd: Westlake Girls' High School (7:00.11); 3rd: St Margaret's College (7:01.72)	Westlake Girls' High School (7:51.60); 2nd: Waikato Diocesan School (8:02.78); 3rd: St Margaret's College (8:04.59)
2015	Karapiro	Hamilton Boys' High School (6:07.43); 2nd: Christ's College (6:07.85); 3rd: Auckland Grammar School (6:15.39)	St Paul's Collegiate School (6:30.22); 2nd: Hamilton Boys' High School (6:33.09); 3rd: Christ's College (6:34.25)	St Margaret's College (7:09.10); 2nd: Epsom Girls' Grammar School (7:11.42); 3rd: Waikato Diocesan School (7:12.05)	Waikato Diocesan School (7:24.56); 2nd: Rangi Ruru Girls' School (7:28.09); 3rd: Wellington East Girls' College (7:29.88)
2016	Ruataniwha	Christ's College (5:58.09); 2nd: Hamilton Boys' High School (6:00.93); 3rd: Christchurch Boys' High School (6:02.23)	Christ's College (6:38.49); 2nd: Marlborough Boys' College (6:39.94); 3rd: Hamilton Boys' High School (6:41.47)	Diocesan School for Girls (6:46.63); 2nd: St Margaret's College (6:47.58); 3rd: Sacred Heart Girls' College (Ham) (6:52.59)	Diocesan School for Girls (7:29.73); 2nd: Sacred Heart Girls' College (Ham) (7:33.29); 3rd: St Margaret's College (7:34.10)
2017	Karapiro	St Andrew's College (6:02.12); 2nd: Christ's College (6:03.10); 3rd: Hamilton Boys' High School (6:04.41)	St Andrew's College (6:33.82); 2nd: Westlake Boys' High School (6:41.57); 3rd: Saint Kentigern College (6:42.50)	Diocesan School for Girls (6:55.09); 2nd: St Margaret's College (6:58.09); 3rd: St Paul's Collegiate School (6:58.81)	St Paul's Collegiate School (7:15.52); 2nd: Nelson College for Girls (7:18.92); 3rd: Diocesan School for Girls (7:20.07)
2018	Ruataniwha	Christ's College (6:01.90); 2nd: Hamilton Boys' High School (6:03.82); 3rd: Christchurch Boys' High School (6:09.49)	Hamilton Boys' High School (6:36.58); 2nd: Christchurch Boys' High School (6:36.75); 3rd: Westlake Boys' High School (6:49.92)	St Peter's School, Cambridge (6:55.10); 2nd: Rangi Ruru Girls' School (6:58.68); 3rd: Wanganui Collegiate School (6:59.33)	St Peter's School, Cambridge (7:30.70); 2nd: Rangi Ruru Girls' School (7:39.88); 3rd: Waikato Diocesan School (7:40.89)
2019	Karapiro	Christchurch Boys' High School (5:54.31); 2nd: Christ's College (5:55.71); 3rd: Auckland Grammar School (6:03.86)	Christchurch Boys' High School (6:25.39); 2nd: Westlake Boys' High School (6:29.18); 3rd: Christ's College (6:30.60)	St Margaret's College (6:39.54); 2nd: Waikato Diocesan School (6:40.83); 3rd: St Peter's School, Cambridge (6:43.40)	Waikato Diocesan School (7:14.88); 2nd: Christchurch Girls' High School (7:19.18); 3rd: Rangi Ruru Girls' School (7:19.32)
2020	Ruataniwha	Cancelled due to COVID-19 coronavirus pandemic			
2021	Karapiro	Christ's College (6:06.47); 2nd: Auckland Grammar School (6:12.88); 3rd: St Andrew's College (6:13.32)	Auckland Grammar School (6:50.39); 2nd: St Andrew's College (6:53.21); 3rd: Christ's College (6:55.76)	Rangi Ruru Girls' School (6:54.35); 2nd: Christchurch Girls' High School (6:55.80); 3rd: St Margaret's College (6:59.27)	Christchurch Girls' High School (7:40.71); 2nd: Rangi Ruru Girls' School (7:46.44); 3rd: Waikato Diocesan School (7:49.70)
2022	Ruataniwha	Hamilton Boys' High School (6:04.01); 2nd: Christ's College (6:07.22); 3rd: Christchurch Boys' High School (6:08.10)	Mount Albert Grammar School l (6:38.63); 2nd: St Andrew's College (6:41.06); 3rd: Christchurch Boys' High School (6:42.74)	Rangi Ruru Girls' School (6:54.19); 2nd: St Margaret's College (6:56.63); 3rd: Rangi Ruru Girls School #2 (6:58.88)	Rangi Ruru Girls' School (7:22.23); 2nd: St Margaret's College (7:23.01); 3rd: Epsom Girls Grammar School (7:28.65)
2023	Karapiro	St Bede's College (5:42.17); 2nd: Hamilton Boys' High School (5:42.23)3rd: Westlake Boys High School (5:46.51)	St Bede's College (6:41.93); 2nd: Sacred Heart College (Auckland) (6:42.75)3rd: Westlake Boys High School (6:49.35)	Rangi Ruru Girls' School (6:27.68); 2nd: Rangi Ruru Girls School #2 (6:33.54)3rd: St Margaret's College (6:35.78)	Rangi Ruru Girls' School (7:36.91); 2nd: Waikato Diocesan School (7:45.67)3rd: Wellington Girls College (7:47.37)
2024	Ruataniwha	Hamilton Boys' High School (5:59.34); 2nd: St Bede's College (6:02.34); 3rd: St Peters College (6:02.49)	Hamilton Boys' High School (6:32.43); 2nd: St Andrews College (6:36.98); 3rd: Mt Albert Grammar (6:37.18)	Christchurch Girls' High School (6:45.56); 2nd: St Margaret's College (6:48.54); 3rd: Rangi Ruru Girls' School (6:51.83)	Waikato Diocesan School (7:17.58); 2nd: Rangi Ruru Girls' School (7:21.09); 3rd: Marlborough Girls' College (7:22.23)
2025	Karapiro	Westlake Boys High School (6:07.48) 2nd: St Bede's College (6:10.23)3rd: Christ's College (6:14.22)	Westlake Boys High School (6:39.73) 2nd: Hamilton Boys' High School (6:46.01)3rd: Christ's College (6:47.31)	St Margaret's College (7:06.96); 2nd: Waikato Diocesan School (7:09.16); 3rd: Rangi Ruru Girls' School (7:09.70)	Rangi Ruru Girls' School (7:30.58); 2nd: Waikato Diocesan School (7:32.62)3rd: St Margaret's College (7:34.18)
2026	Ruataniwha	Kings College (6:11.26); 2nd: Auckland Grammar School (6:14.82); 3rd: St Bede's College (6:16.36)	Kings College (6:38.89); 2nd: Hamilton Boys' High School (6:40.66); 3rd: Westlake Boys High School (6:40.73)	Waikato Diocesan School (6:53.13); 2nd: Rangi Ruru Girls' School (6:55.54); 3rd: St Margaret's College (6:57.23)	Rangi Ruru Girls' School (7:23.88); 2nd: Waikato Diocesan School (7:29.87)3rd: Cashmere High School (7:31.41)

== List of overall points ==
Year	Venue	Star Trophy (all events)	Executive Trophy (sweep-oar)	Presidents Scull (sculling)
1997	Karapiro	Rangi Ruru Girls' School (62); 2nd: St Margaret's College (33); 3rd: Southland Boys' High School (32)		
1998	Ruataniwha	Rangi Ruru Girls' School (51); 2nd: St Margaret's College (42); 3rd: Christchurch Boys' High School (22)		
1999	Karapiro	Rangi Ruru Girls' School (69); 2nd: St Margaret's College (37); 3rd: Christ's College (26)		
2000	Ruataniwha	Rangi Ruru Girls' School (60); 2nd: St Margaret's College (41); 3rd: St Paul's Collegiate (20)		
2001	Karapiro	St Margaret's College (45); 2nd: Rangi Ruru Girls' School (27); 3rd: St Paul's Collegiate (24)		
2002	Ruataniwha	St Margaret's College (33); 2nd: James Hargest High School (30); 3rd: Rangi Ruru Girls' School (23)		
2003	Karapiro	St Margaret's College (60); 2nd: Hamilton Boys' High School (25); 3rd: Queen Charlotte College (21)	St Margaret's College (38); 2nd: Hamilton Boys' High School (25); 3rd: Rangi Ruru Girls' School (20)	St Margaret's College (22); 2nd: Queen Charlotte College (20); 3rd: Tauranga Girls' College (13)
2004	Ruataniwha	St Margaret's College (53); 2nd: Hamilton Boys' High School (28); 3rd: Queen Charlotte College (21)	St Margaret's College (36); 2nd: Hamilton Boys' High School (28); 3rd: Rangi Ruru Girls' School (20)	Queen Charlotte College (21); 2nd: Rotorua Lakes High School (18); 3rd: St Margaret's College (21)
2005	Karapiro	Hamilton Boys' High School (42); 2nd: Sacred Heart Girls' College (Hamilton) (29); 3rd: St Margaret's College / Kings' College (23, tie)	Hamilton Boys' High School (42); 2nd: Sacred Heart Girls' College (Hamilton) (29); 3rd: Rangi Ruru Girls' School (21)	Wanganui High School (18); 2nd: King's College (15); 3rd: Queen Charlotte College (14)
2006	Ruataniwha	Rangi Ruru Girls' School (32); 2nd: Hamilton Boys' High School (29); 3rd: Christ's College (26)	Hamilton Boys' High School (29); 2nd: Rangi Ruru Girls' School (27); 3rd: Christ's College (21)	Marlborough Girls' College (19); 2nd: St Andrew's College (16); 3rd: Bethlehem College / Takapuna Grammar School (10, tie)
2007	Karapiro	Rangi Ruru Girls' School (38); 2nd: Hamilton Boys' High School (37); 3rd: Nelson College for Girls (28)	Hamilton Boys' High School (32); 2nd: Rangi Ruru Girls' School (29); 3rd: Nelson College for Girls (18)	Hauraki Plains College / Nelson College (22, tie); 3rd: Bethlehem College (15)
2008	Ruataniwha	Hamilton Boys' High School (55); 2nd: Rangi Ruru Girls' School (39); 3rd: Roncalli College (26)	Hamilton Boys' High School (50); 2nd: Rangi Ruru Girls' School (33); 3rd: Wanganui Collegiate School (21)	Roncalli College (26); 2nd: Marlborough Girls' College (11); 3rd: Wanganui High School (10)
2009	Karapiro	Hamilton Boys' High School (54); 2nd: Rangi Ruru Girls' School (49); 3rd: James Hargest College (27)	Hamilton Boys' High School (49); 2nd: Rangi Ruru Girls' School (44); 3rd: Waikato Diocesan School (16)	James Hargest College (24); 2nd: Roncalli College (19); 3rd: Edgecumbe College (10)
2010	Ruataniwha	Rangi Ruru Girls' School (33); 2nd: Marlborough Boys' College (27); 3rd: St Peter's School / James Hargest College (26, tie)	Rangi Ruru Girls' School (33); 2nd: Hamilton Boys' High School (25); 3rd: Waikato Diocesan School (22)	St Peter's School (25); 2nd: Marlborough Boys' College (19); 3rd: James Hargest College (18)
2011	Karapiro	Waikato Diocesan School (53); 2nd: St Peter's School (26); 3rd: St Margaret's College (21)	Waikato Diocesan School (45); 2nd: Auckland Grammar School (21); 3rd: St Margaret's College (18)	St Peter's School (20); 2nd: Kavanagh College (18); 3rd: Craighead Diocesan School (17)
2012	Ruataniwha	St Peter's School (37); 2nd: St Margaret's College (31); 3rd: Auckland Grammar School (24)	St Margaret's College (30); 2nd: Auckland Grammar School (24); 3rd: Christ's College (19)	Kavanagh College / St Peter's School (22, tie); 3rd: Timaru Boys' High School (19)
2013	Karapiro	Hamilton Boys' High School (44); 2nd: St Margaret's College (38); 3rd: Waikato Diocesan School (32)	Hamilton Boys' High School (40); 2nd: St Margaret's College (37); 3rd: Waikato Diocesan School (27)	Kavanagh College (31); 2nd: Whakatane High School (17); 3rd: St Peter's School (14)
2014	Ruataniwha	Hamilton Boys' High School (39); 2nd: St Peter's School (26); 3rd: St Margaret's College (25)	Hamilton Boys' High School (27); 2nd: St Margaret's College (25); 3rd: Waikato Diocesan School (23)	St Peter's School (25); 2nd: Whakatane High School (17); 3rd:Glendowie College (16)
2015	Karapiro	Hamilton Boys' High School (46); 2nd: St Peter's School (37); 3rd: Waikato Diocesan School (29)	Hamilton Boys' High School (40); 2nd: Waikato Diocesan School (24); 3rd: St Margaret's College (21)	St Peter's School (37); 2nd: Whakatane High School (25); 3rd:Kings College / Southland Girls' High School (11, tie)
2016	Ruataniwha	St Peter's School (43); 2nd: Hamilton Boys' High School (36); 3rd: Christchurch Boys' High School (26)	Rangi Ruru Girls' School (24); 2nd: Hamilton Boys' High School (20); 3rd: Christ's College (17)	St Peter's School (30); 2nd=: Ashburton College / Hauraki Plains College (21, tie)
2017	Karapiro	Hamilton Boys' High School (51); 2nd: St Peter's School (48); 3rd: Ashburton College (26)	Hamilton Boys' High School (30); 2nd: Rangi Ruru Girls' School (23); 3rd: St Andrew's College (21)	St Peter's School (40); 2nd: Ashburton College (26); 3rd: Hamilton Boys' High School (21)
2018	Ruataniwha	St Peter's School (52); 2nd: Hamilton Boys' High School (39); 3rd: Christchurch Boys' High School (31)	Hamilton Boys' High School (27); 2nd: Rangi Ruru Girls' School (25); 3rd: Waikato Diocesan School (24)	St Peter's School (31); 2nd: Ashburton College (21); 3rd: Christchurch Boys' High School (16)
2019	Karapiro	Christchurch Boys' High School (42); 2nd: Hamilton Boys' High School (37); 3rd: St Peter's School (28)	Hamilton Boys' High School (27); 2nd=: Christchurch Boys' High School / Christ's College (21, tie)	St Peter's School (24); 2nd=: Christchurch Boys' High School / Dunstan High School (21, tie)
2020	Ruataniwha	Cancelled due to COVID-19 coronavirus pandemic		
2021	Karapiro	Rangi Ruru Girls' School (47); 2nd: Auckland Grammar School (30); 3rd: Dunstan High School (28)	Rangi Ruru Girls School (47); 2nd: Auckland Grammar School (24); 3rd: Hamilton Boys' High School (17)	Dunstan High School (28); 2nd: Whakatane High School (19); 3rd=: Takapuna Grammar School / St Peter's College (16, tie)
2022	Ruataniwha	Rangi Ruru Girls' School (29); 2nd=: Wakatipu High School / Hamilton Boys' High School (24, tie)	Rangi Ruru Girls' School (29); 2nd: Hamilton Boys High School (19); 3rd: St Bedes College, Christchurch (17)	Wakatipu High School (24); 2nd: St Pauls Collegiate School (16); 3rd=: Macleans College / Hamilton Girls / Takapuna Grammar(10, tie)
2023	Karapiro	Rangi Ruru Girls' School (43); 2nd: St Bede's College (28); 3rd: St Margaret's College (24)	Rangi Ruru Girls' School (43); 2nd: St Margaret's College (24)3rd: St Bede's College (23)	Wakatipu High School (23); 2nd: Cashmere High School (18); 3rd=: Timaru Boys / Cambridge High (15, tie)
2024	Ruataniwha	Hamilton Boys' High School (29); 2nd:Rangi Ruru Girls' School (27); 3rd: St Margaret's College (24)	Rangi Ruru Girls' School (27); 2nd=: St Margaret's College (24)2nd=: Hamilton Boys' High School (24)	Wakatipu High School / Cashmere High School (20); 3rd: Whanganui High School (19)
2025	Karapiro	Kings College (32); 2nd:Rangi Ruru Girls' School (29); 3rd: St Margaret's College (27)	Kings College (32); 2nd:Rangi Ruru Girls' School (29); 3rd: St Margaret's College (24)	Wakatipu High School (23); 2nd: St Peter's School (22); 3rd: St Pauls Collegiate School (21)
2026	Ruataniwha	Waikato Diocesan School (43); 2nd: Kings College (32); 3rd=: Rangi Ruru Girls' School (31)3rd= Wakatipu High School (31)	Waikato Diocesan School (43); 2nd=: Kings College (31); 2nd=: Rangi Ruru Girls' School (31)	Wakatipu High School (31); 2nd: Whanganui High School (23); 3rd: St Pauls Collegiate School (19)

== Single sculls champions ==
The following is the list of recent single sculls champions

	Boys			Girls		
Year	U16	U17	U18	U16	U17	U18
1995		(Kings College)	(Southland Boys)		(Steiner Hastings)	(Steiner Hastings)
1996		(Southland Boys)	(Kings College)		(Gisborne Girls)	(St Margarets)
1997		(St Peters School)	(Southland Boys)		(Pukekohe High)	(Marlborough Girls)
1998		(Southland Boys)	(St Peters School)		(Pukekohe High)	(Pukekohe High)
1999		(Hauraki Plains College)	(Southland Boys)		(Pukekohe High)	(Diocesan School)
2000		N.Jones (Wanganui City)	R.Stephens (St Kentigern)		R.Scott (St Peters School)	Z.Gordon (Wellington Girls)
2001		K.Taaffe (Hauraki Plains)	N.Jones (Wanganui City)		EJ. Feathery (Avonside Girls)	S.Hudson (Otago Girls)
2002		N.Cohen (James Hargest)	K.Taaffe (Hauraki Plains)		S.Kelly (Wanganui Girls)	EJ. Feathery (Avonside Girls)
2003		N.Cohen (James Hargest)	N.Cohen (James Hargest)		E.Twigg (Napier Girls)	E.Twigg (Napier Girls)
2004		J.Sullivan (Queen Charlotte)	J.Sullivan (Queen Charlotte)		E.Twigg (Napier Girls)	E.Twigg (Napier Girls)
2005		G.Oberlin-Brown (Te Awamutu)	J.Sullivan (Queen Charlotte)		A.Stantiall (Cullinane College)	R.Ryall (Kings College)
2006		H.Poor (Takapuna Grammar)	H.Poor (Takapuna Grammar)		L.Fischer (Rotorua Lakes)	G.Armstrong (Mt Maunganui)
2007		J.Orsbourn (Nelson College)	J.Orsbourn (Nelson College)		E.Stocker (Craighead Diocesan)	A.Pulford (Hauraki Plains)
2008		S.Wells (Wellington College)	M.O'Connor (James Hargest)		J.Edward (Rotorua Girls)	S.Gray (Wanganui High)
2009		H.Cohen (James Hargest)	G.Thomas (Havelock North)		S.Murray (Edgecumbe College)	C.Anderson (Hutt Valley High)
2010		S.Jones (St Peters College)	O.Beherent (James Hargest)		C.Hyde (John Paul College)	L.Livesey (Roncalli College)
2011	M.Boonen (Trident High)	R.Wilson (Marlborough Boys)	R.Morrell (Western Heights)	Z.McBride (Kavanaugh College)	H.Osborne (Waikato Diocesan)	T.Young (James Hargest)
2012	A.Possegger (Wanganui Collegiate)	M.Mackenzie-Mol (Queen Charlotte)	C.Crampton (Timaru Boys)	H.Bailey (Woodford House)	Z.McBride (Kavanaugh College)	Z.McBride (Kavanaugh College)
2013	R.Bruce (Mt Aspiring College)	J.O'Leary (Kavanaugh College)	M.Mackenzie-Mol (Queen Charlotte)	J.Fauth (St Kevins)	H.Bailey (Woodford House)	Z.McBride (Kavanaugh College)
2014	R.Bruce (Mt Aspiring College)	H.Robertson (Onslow College)	J.O'Leary (Kavanaugh College)	G.King (Napier Girls)	G.King (Napier Girls)	G.Allen (Hamilton Girls)
2015	M.Taylor (Waitaki Boys)	B.Camp (St Peters School)	B.Watkinson (Dilworth School)	V.Wall (Ashburton College)	C.MacDonald (Fraser High)	M.Townshend (Southland Girls)
2016	X.Wright (Verdon College)	M.Taylor (Waitaki Boys)	J.Lopas (Christchurch Boys)	V.Wall (Ashburton College)	V.Wall (Ashburton College)	V.Wall (Ashburton College)
2017	J.Nel (St Peters School)	G.Olifers (Trident High)	B.Leydon (John McGlashan College)	M.Gibson (Ashburton College)	V.Wall (Ashburton College)	V.Wall (Ashburton College)
2018	E.Williams (Takapuna Grammar)	J.McLaughlan (John McGlashan College)	J.Gibbs (Roncalli College)	S.Mirfin (Southland Girls)	M.Gibson (Ashburton College)	V.Wall (Ashburton College)
2019	H.Fitzpatrick (St Peters College)	S.Shackleton (Christchurch Boys)	J.Nel (St Peters School)	A.Wright (Iona College)	S.Mirfin (Southland Girls)	P.Trolove (Craighead Diocesan)
2020	Cancelled due to COVID-19 coronavirus pandemic					
2021	J.Henry (Onewhero Area School)	R.Wills (St Pauls Collegiate)	O.Ruston (Gisborne Boys)	G.Thomson (St Andrews College)	S.Hodson (Sacred Heart New Plymouth)	S.Smith (Dunstan High)
2022	L.Turral (MacLeans College)	M.King-Smith (Wakatipu High)	R.Wills (St Pauls Collegiate)	A.Lennard (Onslow College)	P.Horan (Dunstan High)	C.Lightfoot (Queen Charlotte)
2023	B.Allan (Timaru Boys)	J. McConnochie (Tauranga Boys)	M.King-Smith (Wakatipu High)	S.Gibson (Ashburton College)	T.O'Dwyer (Cambridge High)	F.Todhunter (St Andrews)
2024	H.Kavanagh (Wellington College)	B.Allan (Timaru Boys)	J.Dimock (MacLeans College)	A.Everitt (Mt Maunganui College)	O.Tattersfield (Mt Albert Grammar)	E.Bagrie (Wellington Girls College)
2025	G.Talbot (Timaru Boys)	G.Benjamin (St Pauls Collegiate)	N.Strachan (MacLeans College)	I.Moffett (Ashburton College)	E.Clare (Cashmere High)	A.Carney (Waikato Diocesan)
2026	J.Sadler (Timaru Boys)	T.Rattray (Mt Albert Grammar)	A.Bennett (Marlborough Boys)	L.Earl (Columba College)	Z.Blackie (St Cuthberts College)	E.Clare (Cashmere High)

== Karapiro vs Ruataniwha ==
A comparison of recorded gold medal-winning times from 1995 to 2026 yields the following results, Based on average winning times, Karapiro tends to record faster times.

1995–2026 Maadi Regatta Final winning times											
Style	Category	Sex	Age	Event	Fastest Karapiro	Fastest Ruataniwha	Slowest Karapiro	Slowest Ruataniwha	Average Karapiro	Average Ruataniwha	
Scull	Singles	Boys	U16	BU161X	7:19.91 (2023)	7:29.25 (2012)	7:51.95 (2015)	7:49.13 (2022)	7:39.83	7:43.08	Difference in average gold medal-winning times (1995–2026)
Scull	Singles	Boys	U17	BU171X	7:15.26 (2019)	7:22.35 (2026)	7:51.48 (2003)	8:10.00 (2004)	7:32.65	7:41.16	Difference in average gold medal-winning times (1995–2026)
Scull	Singles	Boys	U18	BU181X	7:09.33 (2015)	7:15.05 (2016)	8:08.69 (1997)	8:10.65 (2004)	7:27.78	7:33.39	Difference in average gold medal-winning times (1995–2026)
Scull	Singles	Girls	U16	GU161X	7:59.57 (2015)	8:20.02 (2014)	8:30.10 (2025)	8:55.43 (2022)	8:14.40	8:33.48	Difference in average gold medal-winning times (1995–2026)
Scull	Singles	Girls	U17	GU171X	8:04.71 (2009)	8:05.48 (2012)	8:49.35 (2023)	9:30.74 (2002)	8:20.88	8:30.20	Difference in average gold medal-winning times (1995–2026)
Scull	Singles	Girls	U18	GU181X	7:50.28 (2017)	8:00.88 (2016)	10:33.08 (1997)	10:06.32 (2002)	8:22.31	8:33.76	Difference in average gold medal-winning times (1995–2026)
Scull	Doubles	Boys	U15	BU152X	6:51.91 (2015)	7:07.54 (2008)	8:00.88 (2007)	8:46.19 (2004)	7:21.07	7:29.52	Difference in average gold medal-winning times (1995–2026)
Scull	Doubles	Boys	U16	BU162X	6:44.27 (2023)	6:56.91 (2022)	7:50.49 (1997)	8:56.29 (2002)	7:06.25	7:19.15	Difference in average gold medal-winning times (1995–2026)
Scull	Doubles	Boys	U17	BU172X	6:44.05 (2009)	6:44.60 (2012)	7:37.92 (2003)	8:16.47 (2004)	7:06.04	7:06.92	Difference in average gold medal-winning times (1995–2026)
Scull	Doubles	Boys	U18	BU182X	6:31.19 (2025)	6:40.76 (2016)	7:22.26 (2003)	7:57.08 (2000)	6:51.29	6:57.40	Difference in average gold medal-winning times (1995–2026)
Scull	Doubles	Girls	U15	GU152X	7:34.21 (2017)	7:50.79 (2014)	8:30.47 (2009)	10:25.72 (2004)	7:52.10	8:17.56	Difference in average gold medal-winning times (1995–2026)
Scull	Doubles	Girls	U16	GU162X	7:31.93 (2007)	7:41.48 (2016)	8:57.31 (1999)	9:05.85 (2002)	7:55.87	8:05.58	Difference in average gold medal-winning times (1995–2026)
Scull	Doubles	Girls	U17	GU172X	7:26.55 (2009)	7:40.27 (2014)	9:19.94 (1997)	10:33.35 (2004)	7:53.57	8:04.06	Difference in average gold medal-winning times (1995–2026)
Scull	Doubles	Girls	U18	GU182X	7:18.31 (2013)	7:34.05 (2010)	8:26.03 (2003)	9:05.96 (2004)	7:39.94	7:53.40	Difference in average gold medal-winning times (1995–2026)
Scull	Quad	Boys	U15	BU154X	6:36.78 (2015)	6:50.46 (2016)	7:24.17 (1997)	8:19.05 (2002)	6:55.26	7:09.09	Difference in average gold medal-winning times (1995–2026)
Scull	Quad	Boys	U16	BU164X	6:23.75 (2015)	6:41.34 (2024)	7:12.86 (1995)	8:02.42 (2002)	6:42.84	7:00.15	Difference in average gold medal-winning times (1995–2026)
Scull	Quad	Boys	U17	BU174X	6:22.24 (2025)	6:30.77 (2016)	7:27.75 (1997)	7:36.22 (2004)	6:45.28	6:49.67	Difference in average gold medal-winning times (1995–2026)
Scull	Quad	Boys	U18	BU184X	6:20.25 (2015)	6:24.87 (2024)	6:39.64 (1999)	8:01.75 (2002)	6:30.57	6:41.69	Difference in average gold medal-winning times (1995–2026)
Scull	Quad	Girls	U15	GU154X	7:18.80 (2015)	7:30.61 (2006)	8:23.23 (2003)	8:35.47 (2000)	7:39.19	7:52.20	Difference in average gold medal-winning times (1995–2026)
Scull	Quad	Girls	U16	GU164X	7:15.14 (2023)	7:24.92 (2010)	8:17.85 (2003)	8:45.69 (2000)	7:29.41	7:42.27	Difference in average gold medal-winning times (1995–2026)
Scull	Quad	Girls	U17	GU174X	7:11.30 (2015)	7:09.46 (2024)	8:02.20 (2007)	9:12.62 (2004)	7:29.29	7:39.94	Difference in average gold medal-winning times (1995–2026)
Scull	Quad	Girls	U18	GU184X	7:03.92 (2025)	7:10.26 (2010)	7:59.99 (2003)	7:53.84 (2000)	7:22.91	7:25.70	Difference in average gold medal-winning times (1995–2026)
Sweep	Pair	Boys	U17	BU172-	6:52.08 (2025)	7:10.22 (2024)	7:28.21 (2021)	7:15.60 (2022)	7:04.56	7:12.40	Difference in average gold medal-winning times (1995–2026)
Sweep	Pair	Boys	U18	BU182-	6:46.15 (2013)	6:59.70 (2024)	7:25.17 (2001)	8:34.60 (2002)	6:58.50	7:21.27	Difference in average gold medal-winning times (1995–2026)
Sweep	Pair	Girls	U17	GU172-	7:30.75 (2025)	7:43.49 (2026)	8:28.50 (2021)	8:00.35 (2022)	7:51.00	7:54.54	Difference in average gold medal-winning times (1995–2026)
Sweep	Pair	Girls	U18	GU182-	7:30.47 (2023)	7:42.34 (2024)	8:05.77 (2007)	8:51.24 (2002)	7:48.38	8:00.63	Difference in average gold medal-winning times (1995–2026)
Sweep	Four	Boys	U15	BU154+	6:50.12 (2009)	6:53.83 (2014)	7:55.61 (1997)	8:00.38 (2000)	7:09.10	7:13.31	Difference in average gold medal-winning times (1995–2026)
Sweep	Four	Boys	U16	BU164+	6:40.46 (2005)	6:43.01 (2024)	7:18.80 (2007)	7:24.23 (2000)	6:53.34	6:58.38	Difference in average gold medal-winning times (1995–2026)
Sweep	Four	Boys	U17	BU174+	6:24.39 (2023)	6:38.68 (2022)	7:10.51 (2007)	7:39.67 (2002)	6:39.04	6:52.96	Difference in average gold medal-winning times (1995–2026)
Sweep	Four	Boys	U18	BU184+	6:25.39 (2019)	6:26.76 (2012)	7:06.60 (1995)	8:07.24 (2002)	6:40.35	6:51.00	Difference in average gold medal-winning times (1995–2026)
Sweep	Four	Girls	U15	GU154+	7:27.74 (2017)	7:29.07 (2006)	8:41.52 (2007)	9:39.30 (2004)	7:50.30	7:58.56	Difference in average gold medal-winning times (1995–2026)
Sweep	Four	Girls	U16	GU164+	7:12.16 (2023)	7:24.08 (2022)	8:01.05 (1997)	9:30.13 (2002)	7:32.69	7:52.14	Difference in average gold medal-winning times (1995–2026)
Sweep	Four	Girls	U17	GU174+	7:08.89 (2019)	7:27.34 (2024)	9:23.63 (1997)	8:13.39 (2000)	7:34.68	7:41.28	Difference in average gold medal-winning times (1995–2026)
Sweep	Four	Girls	U18	GU184+	7:14.88 (2019)	7:17.58 (2024)	8:17.80 (1997)	9:27.72 (2002)	7:36.21	7:39.87	Difference in average gold medal-winning times (1995–2026)
Sweep	Eight	Boys	U15	BU158+	6:14.48 (2007)	6:19.63 (2012)	7:03.74 (1997)	7:42.20 (2004)	6:23.78	6:43.36	Difference in average gold medal-winning times (1995–2026)
Sweep	Eight	Boys	U16	BU168+	5:56.95 (2023)	6:07.60 (2026)	7:16.64 (1997)	7:24.51 (2004)	6:18.05	6:23.72	Difference in average gold medal-winning times (1995–2026)
Sweep	Eight	Boys	U17	BU178+	5:50.11 (2019)	5:55.73 (2024)	6:49.75 (2003)	7:18.26 (2000)	6:07.99	6:17.07	Difference in average gold medal-winning times (1995–2026)
Sweep	Eight	Boys	U18	BU188+	05:42.17 (2023)	5:54.71 (2008)	6:30.82 (1995)	6:43.59 (2002)	6:03.90	6:07.16	Difference in average gold medal-winning times (1995–2026)
Sweep	Eight	Girls	U15	GU158+	6:48.75 (2007)	6:56.75 (2014)	8:43.85 (1997)	8:24.49 (2002)	7:14.13	7:21.45	Difference in average gold medal-winning times (1995–2026)
Sweep	Eight	Girls	U16	GU168+	6:48.80 (2023)	6:48.28 (2022)	7:34.90 (2003)	7:31.93 (1998)	7:02.63	7:06.38	Difference in average gold medal-winning times (1995–2026)
Sweep	Eight	Girls	U17	GU178+	6:31.79 (2023)	6:48.65 (2022)	7:21.00 (2001)	8:49.10 (2002)	6:49.13	7:12.10	Difference in average gold medal-winning times (1995–2026)
Sweep	Eight	Girls	U18	GU188+	6:27.68 (2023)	6:39.63 (2008)	7:18.69 (1995)	7:39.07 (2002)	6:55.02	6:56.96	Difference in average gold medal-winning times (1995–2026)
