= SHGC =

SHGC can mean:

- Sacred Heart Girls' College, Hamilton
- Sacred Heart Girls' College, New Plymouth
- Solar Heat Gain Coefficient
