= Waikato Diocesan School =

Waikato Diocesan School for Girls

Location
- 660 River Road; Chartwell; Hamilton 3210; New Zealand; 37.7645°S 175.2694°E

Information
- Type: State integrated single-sex girls secondary school, years 9–13
- Motto: Veritate, Simplicitate, Fidelitate
- Established: 1909
- Ministry of Education Institution no.: 140
- Principal: Angee Robertson
- Enrolment: 680 (July 2026)
- Socio-economic decile: 10Z
- Website: www.waikatodiocesan.school.nz

Waikato Diocesan School for Girls is a state-integrated single-sex girls' secondary school in Hamilton, New Zealand. It is an Anglican girls' boarding and day school for students of years 9 to 13.

== History ==
Dio was first established as Sonning School in 1909, situated on Milton Street, Hamilton. With only a small roll of four pupils the school began to grow, and as it did there was need for larger premises so it was moved to Anglesea Street. Larger land was then purchased and a new school built on the eastern side of the railway bridge. This school was named Sonning after the Berkshire Village from which the Whitehorn family originated. It was then that the first Bishop of the Waikato, Cecil Cherrington, wanted to establish an Anglican Girls School in Hamilton and the Waikato Board for Diocesan Schools, formed in 1927, leased Sonning School from Mrs Whitehorn. Property at the current site in River Road, Hamilton, New Zealand was then bought in 1929. Waikato Diocesan School was officially opened in 1928 with a roll of 13 boarders and 70 day girls. The school opened at its permanent site in 1930, consisting of its flagship building, Cherrington, the Homestead, a barn, which was used as both hall and chapel, and open air classrooms.

The school has had 13 principals including Rosamond Robertshawe. Vaudine Barnes, Margaret Peapell, Gillian Simpson, Vicky McLennan, and Mary Curran were principals in the following years.

The school has continued to grow and now has a roll of around 620 students.

Waikato Diocesan School was a private school until March 1983, when it integrated into the state education system.

== Admissions and enrolment ==
As a special character school, Waikato Diocesan School for Girls has a strict admissions procedure emphasising Anglican practice or family history at the school. Prospective students are interviewed by the headmaster annually and are informed of their acceptance in writing. As of 2024, annual dues and fees are $10,014 for day students and $27,500 for boarding students.

As of July 2026, Waikato Diocesan School has a roll of 680 students, of which 58 (8.5%) identify as Māori.

As of 2026, the school has an Equity Index of 391, placing it amongst schools whose students have the fewest socioeconomic barriers to achievement (roughly equivalent to deciles 9 and 10 under the former socio-economic decile system).

== Houses ==
Scott	named after Robert Falcon Scott, British Royal Navy Officer and Antarctic explorer
Hillary	named after Sir Edmund Hillary, the first person to climb Mount Everest
Blake	named after Sir Peter Blake, a yachtsman
Shackleton	named after Sir Ernest Shackleton, an Antarctic explorer
Ross	named after Sir James Clark Ross, an Antarctic explorer
Wilson	named after Edward Adrian Wilson, an Antarctic explorer

== Notable alumnae ==
- Dame Ann Ballin (1932–2003), psychologist and victims' rights advocate
- Kylie Bax (born 1975), model and actress
- June Constance Howden (1918–2007), known as Judy, aviator, one of five New Zealand women who joined the Air Transport Auxiliary during World War Two
- Susan O'Regan, mayor of Waipa
- Hannah Osborne (born 1994), Olympic rower
- Julia Ratcliffe (born 1993), track and field Olympic medalist
- Dame Te Atairangikaahu (1931–2006), Māori queen
- Nanaia Mahuta (born 1970), politician and 28th Minister of Foreign Affairs
- Tarryn Davey (born 1996), New Zealand national field hockey player and Olympian
- Jessie Hodges (born 1996), multiple national cycling champion
- Katie Laurie (born 1986), New Zealand and Australian equestrian champion
