= Wakatipu High School =

High school in Queenstown, New Zealand

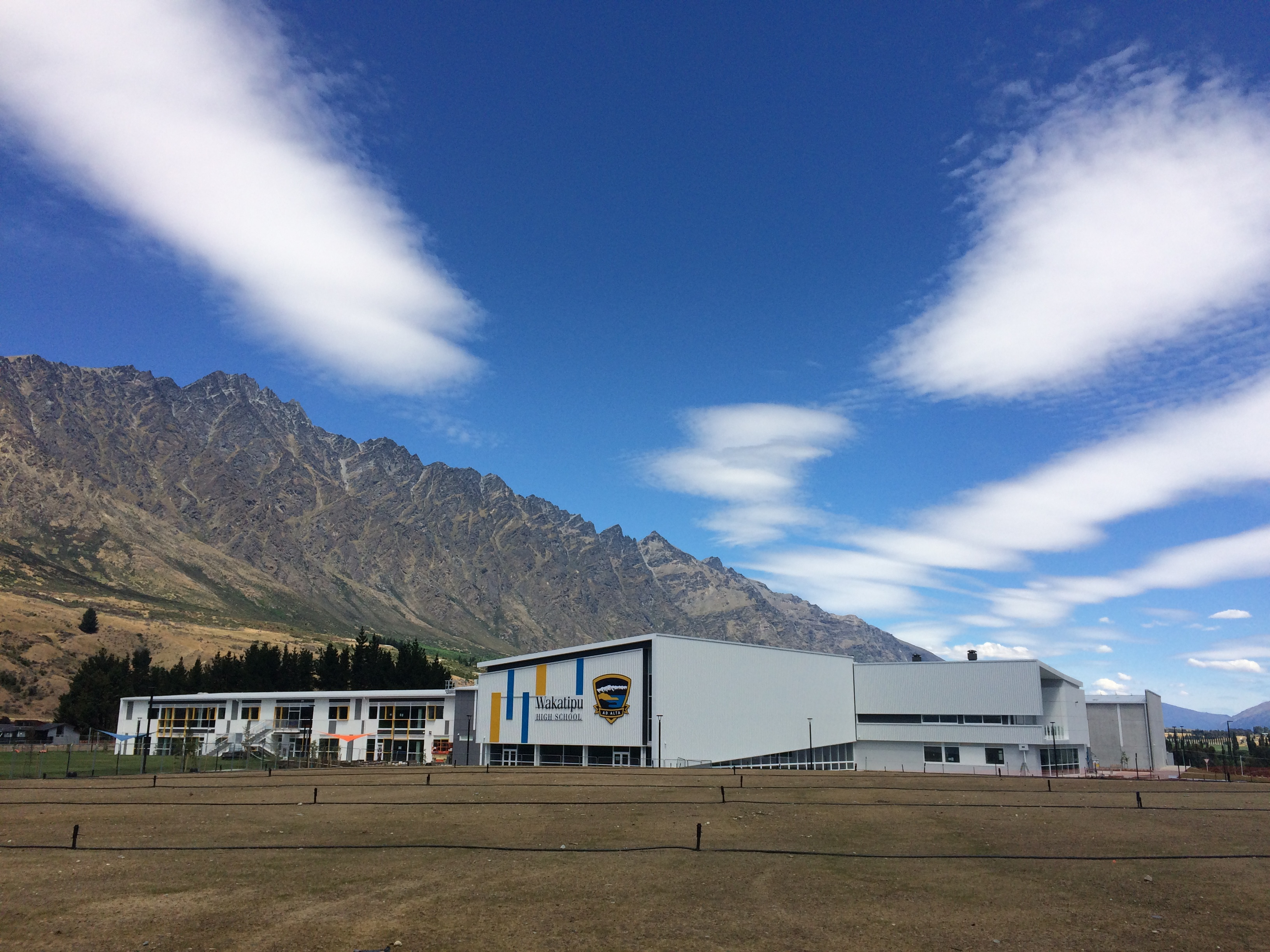

Location
- 47–49 Red Oaks Drive; Frankton; Queenstown 9300; New Zealand; 45.0257°S 168.7487°E

Information
- Type: State Co-Ed Secondary
- Motto: Latin: Ad Alta (Reach for your heights.)
- Established: 1937
- Ministry of Education Institution no.: 374
- Chairman: Adrian Januszkiewicz
- Principal: Oded Nathan
- Staff: 142
- Grades: 9–13
- Enrolment: 1,538 (July 2026)
- Capacity: 1800
- Houses: Arthur; Duncan; Fox; Hay; Mackenzie
- Socio-economic decile: 10Z
- Website: www.wakatipu.school.nz

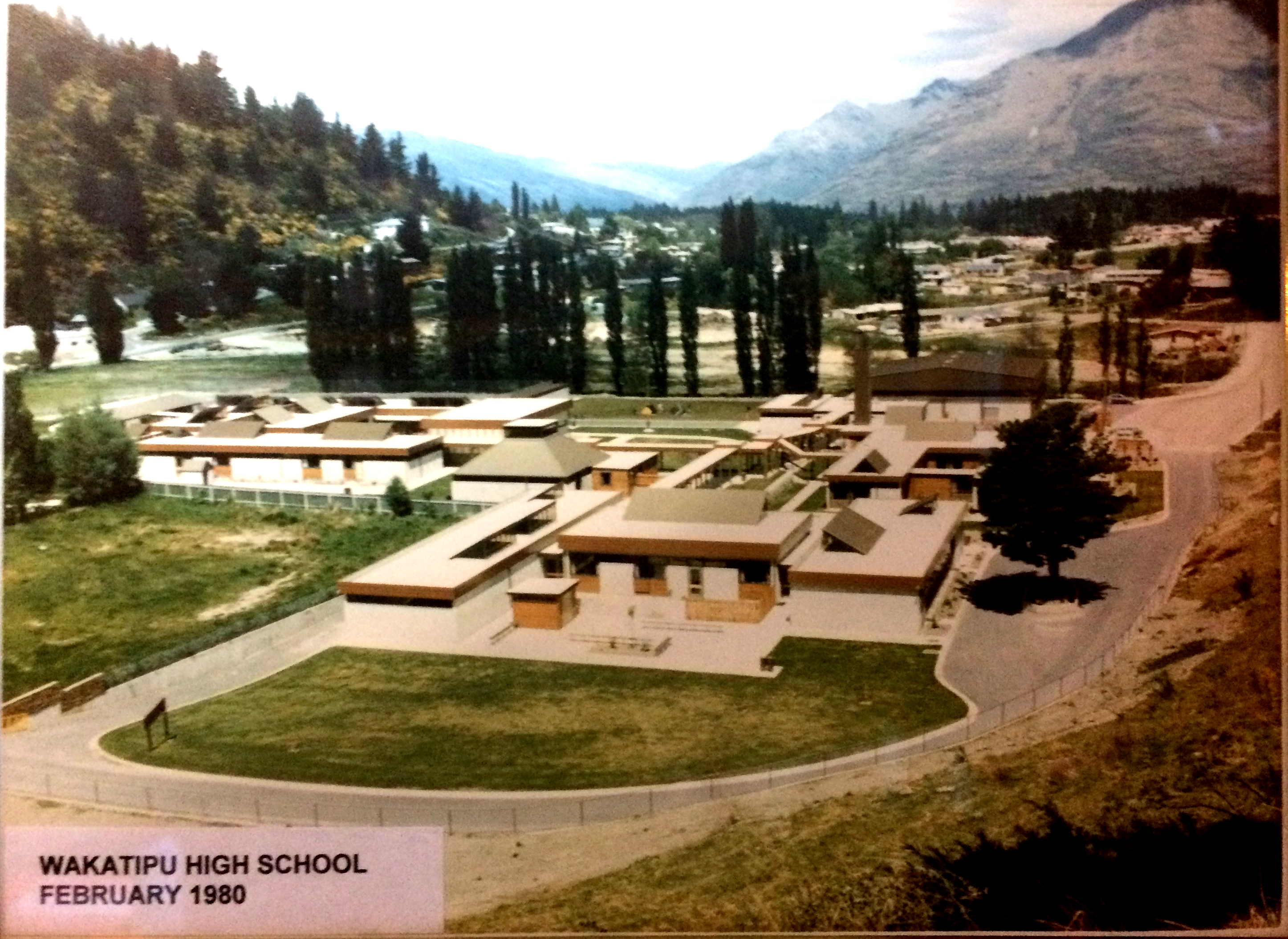
Wakatipu High School, at the former Fryer Street site, in 1980.

Wakatipu High School is a state coeducational secondary school located in Queenstown, New Zealand. Serving Years 9 to 13 (ages 13 to 18). A total of 1,538 students attend the school as of July 2026. As of 2024 it is the only public high school in Queenstown.

== Enrolment ==
As of July 2026, the school has roll of 1,538 students, of which 153 (9.9%) identify as Māori.

As of 2026, the school has an Equity Index of 416, placing it amongst schools whose students have few socioeconomic barriers to achievement (roughly equivalent to deciles 8 and 9 under the former socio-economic decile system).

== Property ==
The school was originally located at 68 Fryer Street in central Queenstown. It was relocated to a new site at 47/49 Red Oaks Drive, Frankton during the 2017/18 summer holidays. Development of the new Wakatipu High School cost approximately $50 million and took place over the course of 2017. The school was developed with a controversial open plan design with the intention of encouraging constructive communication between students. Further development of the school was undertaken in 2020, with an extension of the school being completed in mid-2022 and a second gymnasium being completed at the start of 2023.

In 2023, the maximum student capacity at the site was said to be 1,800. In 2024, it was forecast that continuing growth in the school roll would require that within three years, the 17 temporary classrooms that had been removed from the Frankton site following completion of property upgrades would need to be returned, unless a site for a second school could be obtained.

== Curriculum ==
Wakatipu High School uses National Certificate of Educational Achievement (NCEA) based assessments; the “credits” earned from these exams go towards a student's NCEA qualification. Junior students (year 9 and 10) can gain badges through their "Ākonga Passport" which recognises students for exemplifying the school's values. They can gain 30 points to achieve bronze, 60 points to achieve silver and 100 points to gain the gold level of the Ākonga Passport. To earn points, students need to consistently demonstrate 'the Wakatipu Way', a name for the school's five values; excellence, respect, resilience, inclusion, and responsibility.

== Education Review Office reports ==
In 2024, the Education Review Office reported favourably on the progress that the school had made over the past three years, particularly in reading and writing in the junior school. Disparities in learning outcomes between boys and girls had reduced, and outcomes for Māori and Pacific students had improved.

== Houses ==
Wakatipu High School uses a house system with different colours: Arthur House (blue), Duncan House (black), Fox House (red), Hay House (green), and Mackenzie House (orange). Within these houses are a dean, an assistant dean, and 4-5 student leaders. The houses are named after historical figures from the region.

== Notable alumni ==
- Cool Wakushima – New Zealand snowboarder
- Harriet Miller-Brown – alpine skier and champion slalom skier
- Alice Robinson – alpine skier and champion slalom skier
- Matty McLean – TV personality
- Brianne West – entrepreneur
