= Dunstan High School =

Location
- 12 Enterprise Street; Alexandra 9320; New Zealand; 45.2454°S 169.3864°E

Information
- Type: State co-ed secondary (years 9 to 13)
- Motto: "Seek Wisdom As Gold"
- Established: 1962
- Ministry of Education Institution no.: 372
- Principal: Andrew King
- Enrolment: 590 (July 2026)
- Socio-economic decile: 8P
- Website: dunstan.school.nz

Dunstan High School is a state secondary school located in Alexandra, in the Central Otago district in the South Island of New Zealand.

Dunstan High School also runs the Tititea Outdoor Education Centre, which is located in the old homestead in the East Matukituki Valley on the outskirts of the Mount Aspiring National Park.

In 2009, the school installed an $800,000 clean-burning heating system, replacing a coal-fuelled system, and constructed a new $2.3 million gymnasium.

== Enrolment ==
As of July 2026, Dunstan High School has roll of 590 students, of which 120 (20.3%) identify as Māori.

As of 2026, Dunstan High School has an Equity Index of 445, placing it amongst schools whose students have below average socioeconomic barriers to achievement (roughly equivalent to decile 7 under the former socio-economic decile system).

== Notable alumni ==
- James Te Huna – first New Zealander to enter the Ultimate Fighting Championships (2010)
- Murray Pierce – All Black rugby player
- Ken Rutherford – New Zealand cricket captain; represented the First XI as a player coach
- Elizabeth van Welie – Olympic swimmer (Sydney 2000) and Commonwealth Games silver medalist in the 200m butterfly (Manchester 2002)
- Bevan Wilson – All Black rugby player
- Finn Butcher – New Zealand Canoe Slalom Athlete (2021 Extreme slalom vice world champion). Inaugural Olympic champion in kayak cross in 2024.

== Principals ==
	Name	Term
1	James Beath	1962–1968
2	Gary Jeffery	1969–1976
3	Graham Robinson	1977–1985
4	Rory Gollop	1986–1987
5	Dave Richardson	1988–1999
6	Dave Smyth	1999–2010
7	Brent Russell	2010–2017
8	Reece Goldsmith	2017–2024
9	Andrew King	2024–present
