= Whanganui High School =

Location
- Purnell Street; Springvale; Wanganui 4500; New Zealand; 39.9335°S 175.0331°E

Information
- Established: 1958
- Ministry of Education Institution no.: 189
- Principal: Martin McAllen
- Years offered: 9–13
- Gender: Coeducational
- Enrolment: 1,461 (July 2026)
- Socio-economic decile: 4L
- Website: www.whanganuihigh.school.nz

Whanganui High School is a large state co-educational New Zealand secondary school located in Whanganui, New Zealand. Founded in 1958, the school has a roll of 1479 students, including international students as of July 2018, making it the largest school in Whanganui.

The school spelled its name Wanganui High School until May 2016, when it changed to "Whanganui".

== History ==
In February 1958 a group of 148 Third Formers gathered for the first Assembly in the present D1. There was a staff of nine.

By 1969 the roll had risen to 1100. The first Principal, Mr A.T. Gibson, emphasised 'manners, character, scholarship and human relations'. He stressed that the School was not an 'it' – the 'family' life of the school was vital. These emphases have remained.

The school developed a tradition of 'self-help' and through much fundraising has built up some very good facilities for the use of the students and staff. Facilities such as the Swimming Pool (1962), the Gymnasium (1968), the Centre Court, the extensions to the Cafeteria and Theatrette (1980's), the Shelters (1990's), The Department/Ministry of Education has added the Library (1970), The Music Block (1972), Te Atawhai (1996), Music and Drama renovations (1999), Staffroom – Te Arahi (1999), Science Block and Deans' House – Te Whare Kaiārahi (2002), and new Gymnasium facilities (2006). In 2008 the school celebrated its 50th reunion.

== School motto and life values ==
The school's motto is 'That we might have life' and comes from the Book of John, in the New Testament (Chapter 10, Verse 10) "I am come that they might have life, and they might have it more abundantly". The school interprets this to mean that through academic, cultural, sporting and socialisation opportunities the school provides, each individual will have the opportunity to live life to the full.

Stemming from this motto is Whanganui High School's LIFE values. These are; Learning, Integrity, Fellowship, Excellence. These values form the bases of daily teaching and learning at Whanganui High School

== Enrolment ==
As of July 2026, Whanganui High School has a roll of 1,461 students, of which 459 (31.4%) identify as Māori.

As of 2026, the school has an Equity Index of 482, placing it amongst schools whose students have the above average socioeconomic barriers to achievement (roughly equivalent to decile 4 under the former socio-economic decile system).

== Academics ==
Whanganui High School follows the New Zealand Curriculum (NZC). In Years 11 to 13, students work towards the National Certificate of Educational Achievement (NCEA) the main secondary school qualification in New Zealand, and international qualifications such as Cambridge Assessment International Education in Mathematics.

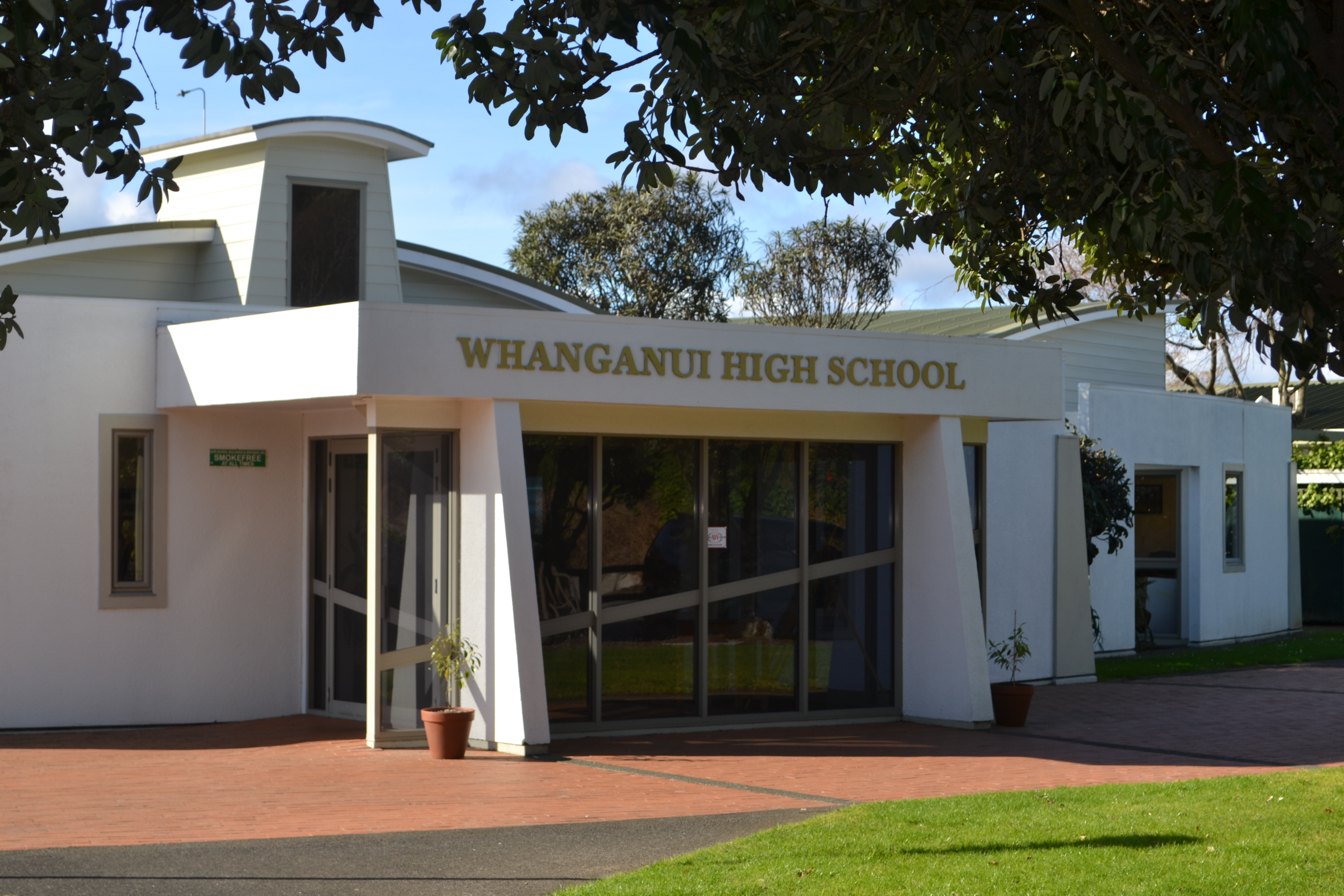
Whanganui High School Front Entrance – August 2017

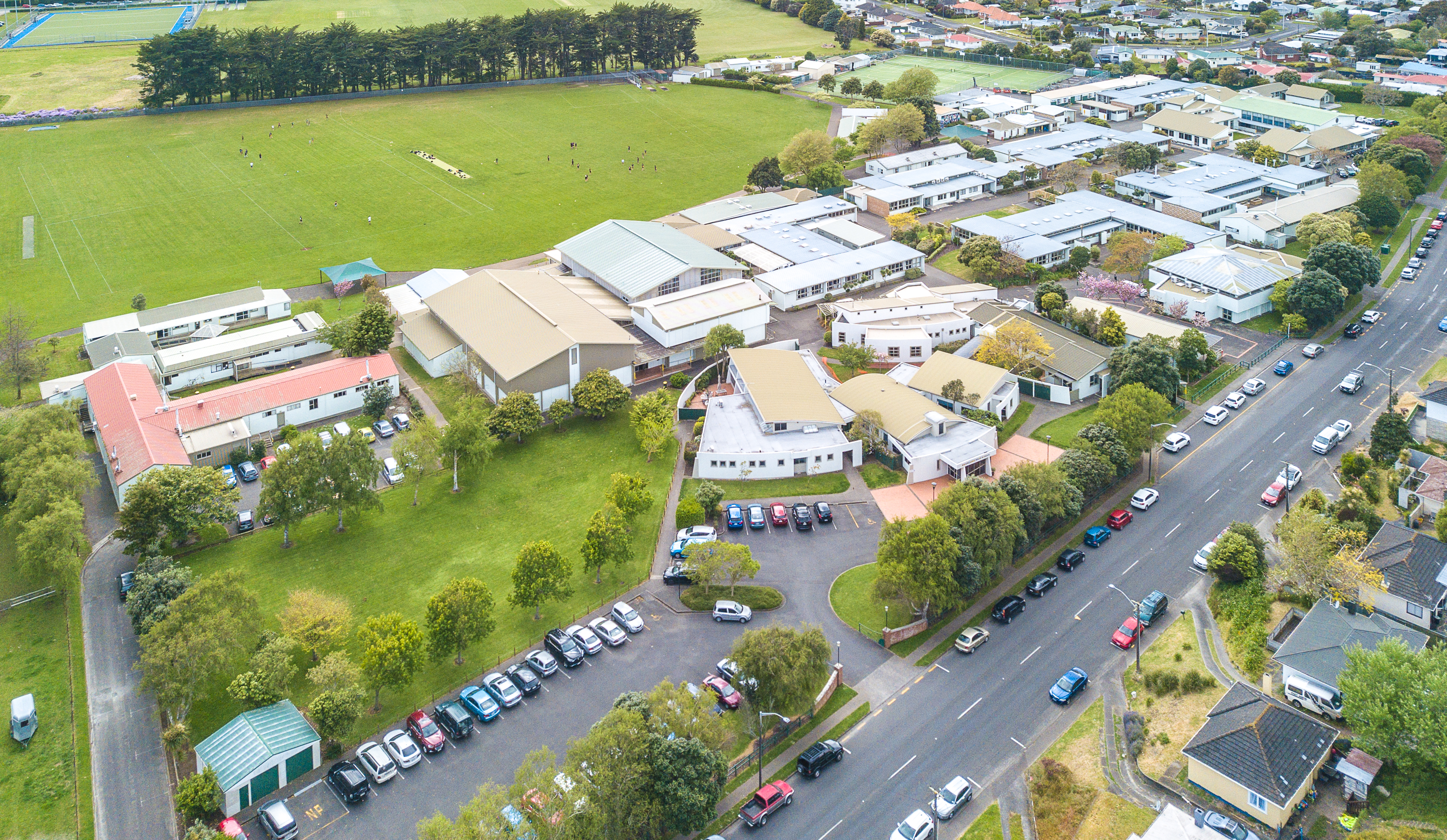
Aerial View of Whanganui High School – October 2018

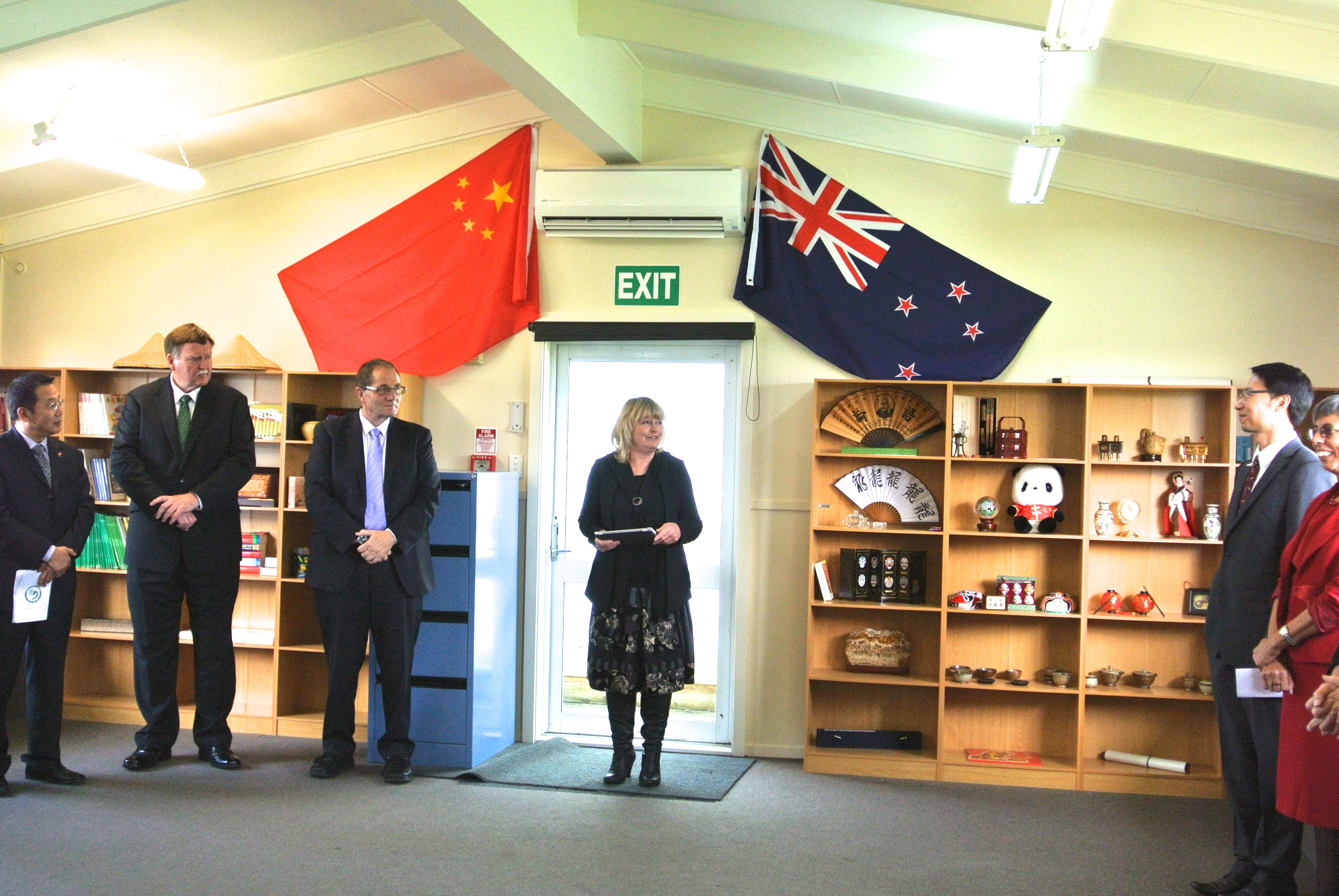
Opening of Whanganui High School's Confucius Classroom – 21 May 2013

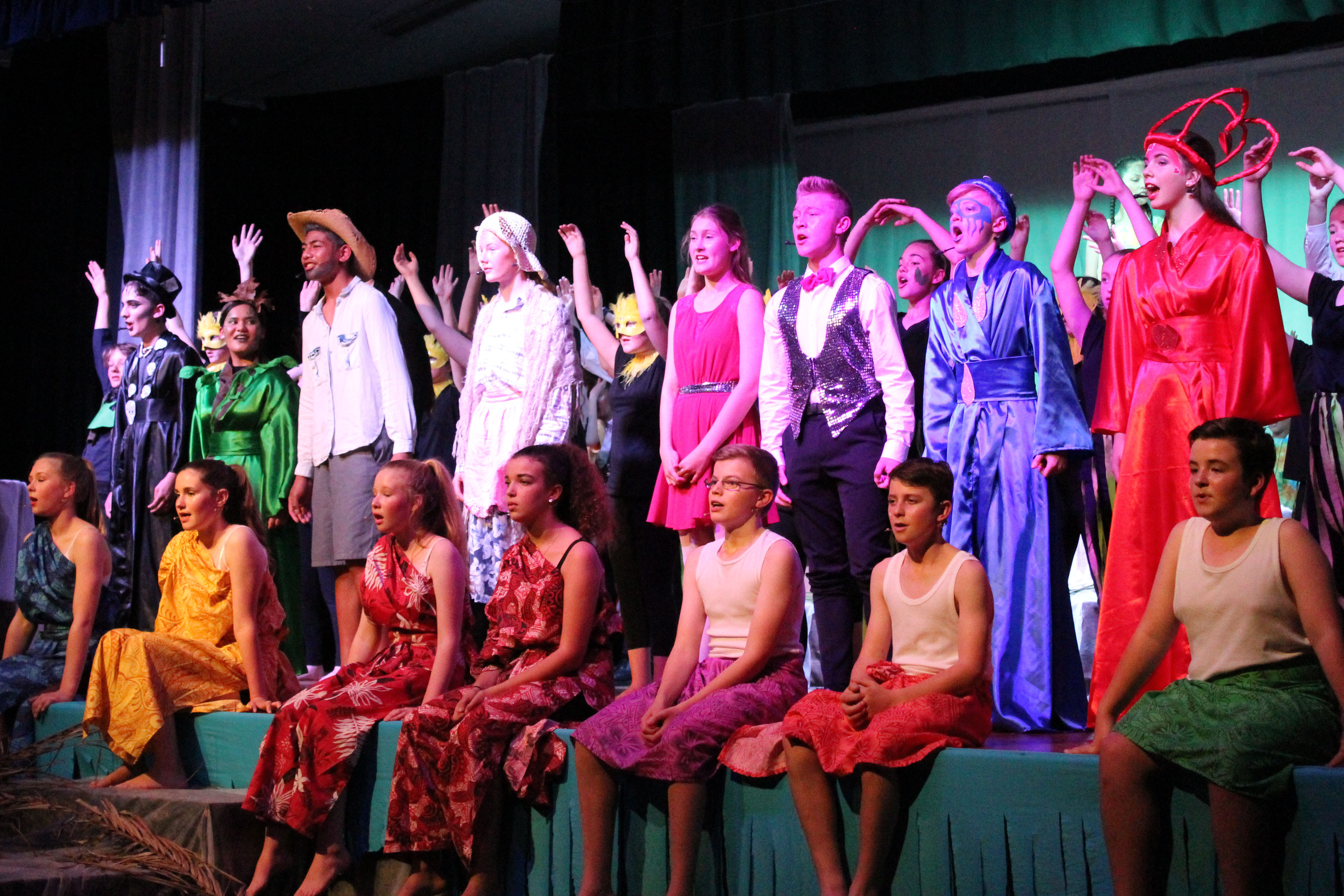
Whanganui High School's Production 'Once on This Island' – June 2018

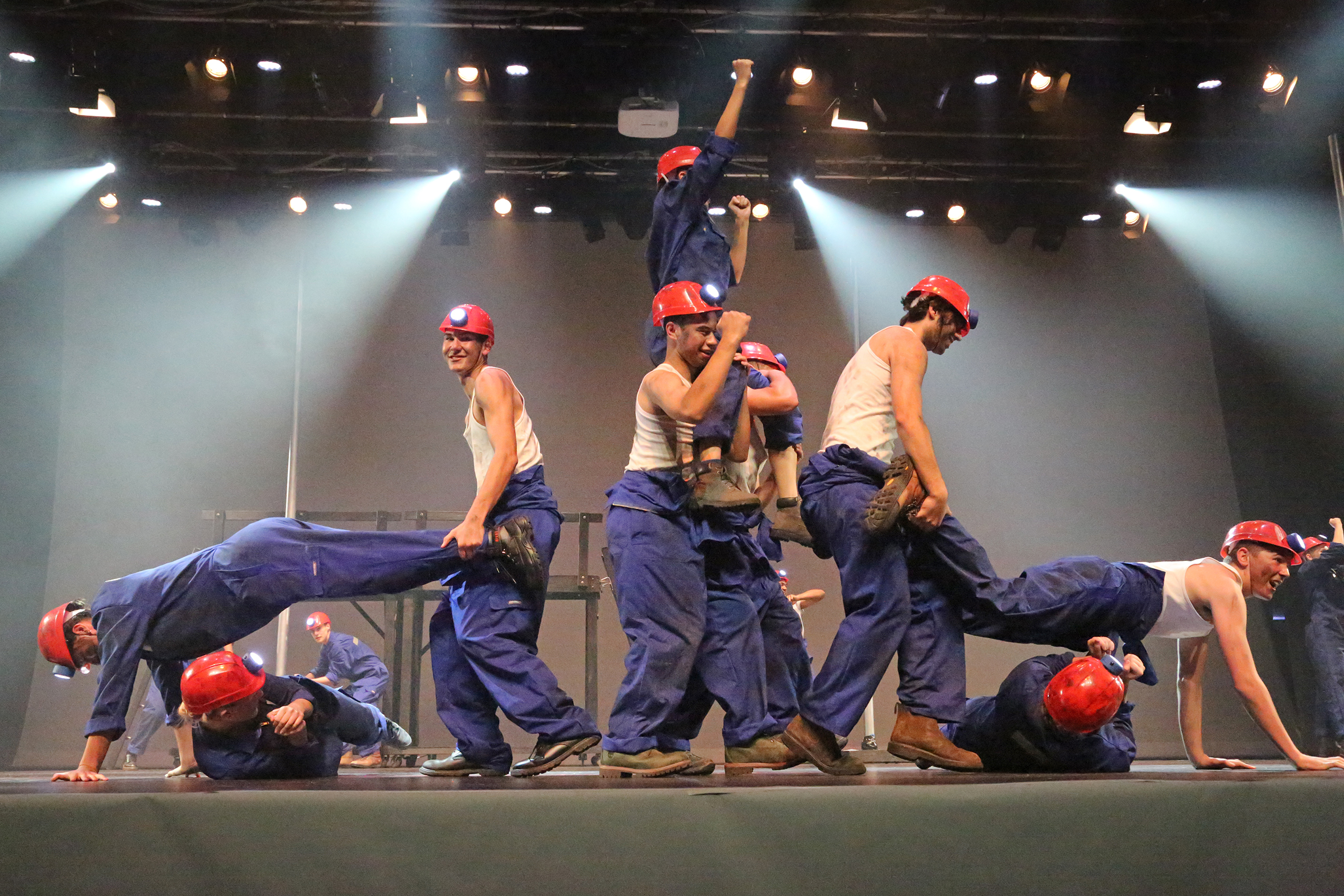
National Stage Challenge Winners – 2016

== Principals ==
The school has had eight principals in its history:

- A.T. Gibson (1958–1967)
- M.D. Fountain (1968–1978)
- P.G. Canham (1979–1985)
- L.I. Power (1985–1993)
- W.J. Maguire (1994–2009)
- N.G. Hanton (2010–2012)
- G. Olver (2012–2016)
- M.G. McAllen (2017–present)

== School houses ==
The official Houses Opening Day for all students and staff of Whanganui High School took place on Friday 16 February 2018 at the Jubilee Stadium, Whanganui. Whanganui High School historically had a house system but it lapsed in 1972; eight Houses were introduced in 1982 just for swimming and athletics but this lapsed in 1989. During 2017 the community was consulted about possible House names and identities. The four House names chosen were Awa, Maunga, Moana and Whenua. Those names were gifted to the school, along with the iwi story of the origin of the Whanganui River at the Houses Opening Day.

The houses of Whanganui High School are:

- AWA
- MOANA
- WHENUA
- MAUNGA

The houses originate from a well-known whakataukī proverb

E rere kau mai te awa nui, Mai i te kāhui maunga ki Tangaroa, Ko au te awa, Ko te awa ko au.

The river flows from the mountain to the sea. I am the river, the river is me.

== Confucius Classroom ==
In 2013 Whanganui High School was approved by the International Confucius Institute in Beijing to set up a Confucius Classroom – one of only four secondary schools in New Zealand and only 400 worldwide. Confucius Institutes are non-profit public institutions aligned with China that aim to promote Chinese language and culture, support local Chinese teaching internationally and organise student cultural exchanges.

== Performing arts ==
Smokefreerockquest

- 2021 Regional Winners – 'Jansen and the Amps'
- 2020 Regional Winners – 'In Business'
- 2019 Regional Winners – 'In Business'
- 2018 Regional Winners – 'The Remnant'
- 2018 National Finalist in the top seven bands
- 2018 Smokefree Tangata Beats – 'The Remnant'
- 2017 Regional Winners – 'Straight Lace'
- 2016 Regional Winners – 'Why Vibrations'
- 2015 Regional Winners – 'Contraband'
- 2014 Regional Winners – 'Contraband'
- 2013 Regional Winners – 'Functional'
- 2012 Regional Winners – 'Red Velvet Cheesecake'
- 2012 National Finalist – 'Red Velvet Cheesecake'
- 2011 Runner Up – 'Red Velvet Cheesecake'
- 2010 Runner Up
- 2009 Regional Winners 'Lambic Rhythms'
- 2007 Regional Winners
- 2005 Third Place Nationally 'The Legions of Sound'
- 2002 National Winners – 'The Have'

DanceNZMade Stage Art

- 2020 Regional Second Place
- 2018 Regional Winners – 'Uncovering Alice'

Smokefree Stage Challenge

- Ten times winners of the New Zealand Regional Smokefree Stage Challenge
- 2016 Regional & National Winners – '29 Below'
- 2014 Regional Winners – 'Invisible Children'
- 2012 Regional Winners – 'Where There's Smoke There's Fire'
- 2009 Second Place Nationally – 'Women's Suffrage'
- 2004 National Winners – 'Scratch the Surface'

== Renaming of gymnasiums ==
In June, 2019 Whanganui High School renamed the school's gymnasiums.

- Vogel Gymnasium was named Te Ihi (excitement)
- Seddon Gymnasium became Te Wehi (awesome)
- Reeves Gymnasium became Te Mana (prestige)
- Ballance Courtyard became The Courtyard

The whakataukī 'te ihi, te wehi, te mana' used in its entirety, refers to the qualities which collectively spark the feeling of exhilaration. Given the purpose of the gymnasiums, these are accurate reflections of the results that are produced.

== Notable alumni ==
- Catherine Bishop, historian
- Sam Blenkinsop, pro downhill mountain biker and medallist at the 2011 UCI Mountain Bike & Trials World Championships
- Max Brown, Olympic canoeist
- Michael Fitzgerald, rugby player
- Chris Harris, olympic rower
- Annette Main, former Mayor of Whanganui
- Sir Jerry Mateparae, Governor General of New Zealand
- Alan McIntyre, hockey player
- James Musa, soccer player
- Sam Malcolm, NZ rugby union player
- Semisi Masirewa, Fijian rugby union player
- Bill Osborne, NZ rugby union player
- Sosoli Talawadua, rugby player NZ Black Ferns
- Jess Watkin, cricketer
- Keightley Watson, international judoka
