= Marlborough Girls' College =

Location
- 21 McLauchlan Street; Springlands; Blenheim 7201; New Zealand; 41°30′25″S 173°56′38″E

Information
- Type: State Single-Sex Girls' Secondary (Year 9–13)
- Motto: Latin: Virtutem Doctrina Parat (Learning Prepares for Life)
- Established: 1963
- Ministry of Education Institution no.: 289
- Principal: Mary-Jeanne Lynch
- Enrolment: 960 (July 2026)
- Socio-economic decile: 7O
- Website: mgc.school.nz

Marlborough Girls' College is a state single-sex secondary school in Blenheim, New Zealand. The school was established in 1963 after splitting from Marlborough College (now Marlborough Boys' College). Serving Years 9 to 13, the college has 960 students as of July 2026.

== History ==
This school was established in 1963. Previously Blenheim was served by the co-educational Marlborough College, which subsequently continued to serve as Marlborough Boys' College.

== Enrolment ==
As of July 2026, Marlborough Girls' College has a roll of 960 students, of which 233 (24.3%) identify as Māori.

As of 2026, the school has an Equity Index of 455, placing it amongst schools whose students have average socioeconomic barriers to achievement (roughly equivalent to deciles 5 and 6 under the former socio-economic decile system).

== Houses ==
The Marlborough Girls' College has four houses:

- Awatere
- Ōpaoa
- Kaituna
- Wairau

== Notable staff ==
- J. S. Parker – artist

== Notable alumnae ==
- Megan Craig (born 1992) – squash player
- Sophie MacKenzie (born 1992) – Olympic rower
- Anna Tempero (born 1994) – gymnast at 2014 Commonwealth Games
- Jenny Shipley (née Robson, born 1952) – former Prime Minister of New Zealand
