= Catherine Bishop (historian) =

New Zealand-born gender and business historian

Catherine Bishop is a New Zealand-born, Australian-based historian specialising in gender and business history. In 2016 she won the Ashurst Business Literature Prize.

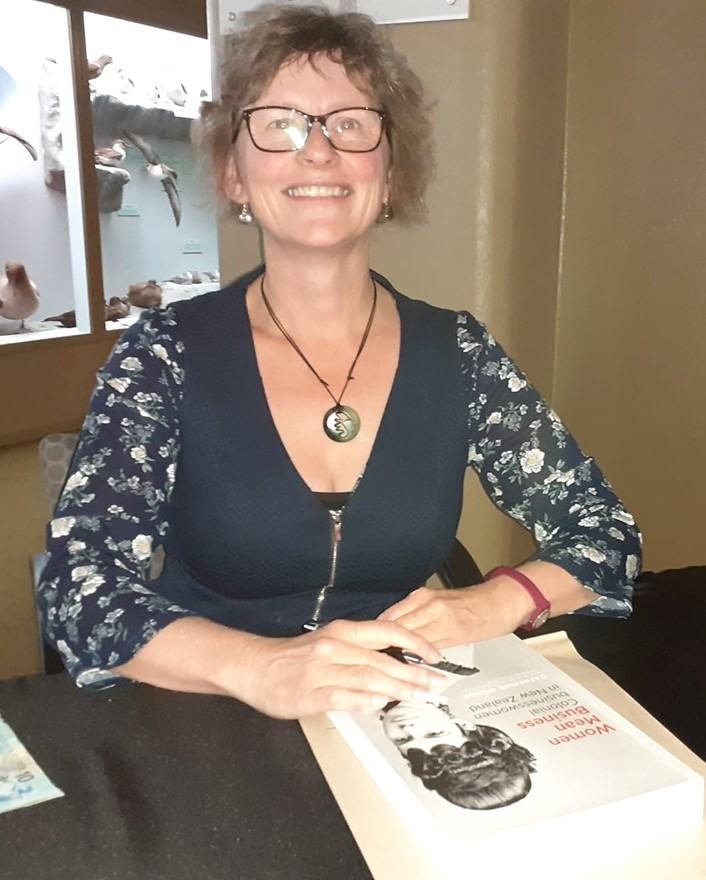
Bishop at Canterbury Museum, Christchurch, New Zealand, October 2019

== Early life and education ==
Bishop grew up in the North Island town of Whanganui, where her father was a teacher at Whanganui Collegiate School and the family lived on the school grounds. Bishop attended Whanganui High School and then moved to Wellington to study history and maths at Victoria University of Wellington. She completed a master's degree in history at the Australian National University in Canberra. In 2012 she completed a PhD in history at the Australian National University, studying the lives of businesswomen in Sydney and Wellington.

== Career ==
In 2015, Bishop published some of her PhD research as the book Minding Her Own Business: Colonial businesswomen in Sydney. The following year, it won the Ashurst Business Literature Prize. In 2016, she was the Australian Religious History Fellow at the State Library of New South Wales. The same year she won the Australian Women's History Network Mary Bennett prize and received a New Zealand History Trust Award to help fund her research for her second book extending her PhD research, Women Mean Business: Colonial businesswomen in New Zealand (Otago University Press, 2019).

In 2019, she was a visiting fellow at Northumbria University in England. From 2019 to 2021 she has a postdoctoral fellowship at Macquarie University and is working on research into Australian businesswomen since 1880.

In 2021 Bishop published Too much cabbage and Jesus Christ : Australia's 'mission girl' Annie Lock (Wakefield Press), this was an extension of her master's degree thesis, about Australian missionary Annie Lock.

Bishop is also a contributor to the Dictionary of Sydney and the Australian Dictionary of Biography.
