= Sacred Heart Girls' College, Hamilton =

New Zealand secondary school

Sacred Heart Girls' College

Location
- 52 Clyde St, Hamilton East, Hamilton; 37°47′31″S 175°17′41″E

Information
- Type: State single-sex girls, Secondary (Year 9–13).
- Motto: Age Quod Agis
- Established: 1884; 142 years ago
- Ministry of Education Institution no.: 139
- Headmaster: Catherine Gunn
- Enrolment: 937 (July 2026)
- Socio-economic decile: 7O
- Website: www.shgcham.school.nz

Sacred Heart Girls College is a state integrated Catholic Girls' secondary school in Hamilton, New Zealand. The school was established by the Sisters of Our Lady of the Missions in 1884. The school crest features the monogram SH and the symbol †, with the motto "Age Quod Agis" across the bottom, translating loosely into "What ever you do, do to the best of your ability".

Sacred Heart Girls' College has a strong relationship with its brother Catholic school, St John's College.

== History ==
In 1884, Sacred Heart Girls' College was opened as a Catholic Secondary School by the Sisters of Our Lady of the Missions to provide an education for Catholic women in the Waikato. Originally small, the campus has now extended both buildings and land. New netball and tennis courts were added and there is now a new Arts Block and library. The school has around 900 students.

In November 2017, the school was set on fire by a former student who threw a firework into the staffroom, causing part of the building to be destroyed. The fire, which amounted to millions of dollars in damage, took almost four hours to be put out by 60 firefighters. The former staffroom has since been replaced by several new rooms, including three science laboratories, an atrium, a students centre and learning centres, which has cost approximately NZ$5 million.

== Enrolment ==
As of July 2026, Sacred Heart Girls' College has a roll of 937 students, of which 169 (18.0%) identify as Māori.

As of 2026, the school has an Equity Index of 439, placing it amongst schools whose students have below average socioeconomic barriers to achievement (roughly equivalent to deciles 6 and 7 under the former socio-economic decile system).

== Houses ==
The College has six houses named after famous women in the Catholic faith:

=== Aubert ===
(Orange) – Suzanne Aubert, foundress of Daughters of Our Lady of Compassion

=== Avila ===
(Purple) – St Teresa of Avila

=== Barbier ===
(Yellow) – Adèle Euphrasie Barbier, foundress of the Sisters of Our Lady of the Missions

=== Mackillop ===
(Green) – St Mary Mackillop

=== Lisieux ===
(Blue) – St Theresa of Lisieux

=== Siena ===
(Pink) – St Catherine of Siena

== Sports ==
The physical education facilities consist of a fitness centre, a squash court, a gymnasium, turfed tennis and netball courts, and use of Steele Park.

School Sports days (Athletics and Swimming) are held outside of the school campus at facilities such as Porritt Stadium and Te Rapa Waterworld.

Major sports are practised outside class times, with games being played after school and in the weekends. Students have been selected as Waikato representatives in most sports.

An incomplete list of sports currently available include: inline hockey, aerobics, athletics, badminton, basketball, bowls, cricket, cycling, duathlon, equestrian, fitness centre, lacrosse, golf, gymnastics, hockey, kickboxing, netball, rowing, rugby, soccer, softball, squash, talent squad, tennis, touch rugby, triathlon, volleyball, waka ama and waterpolo.

== See also ==
- List of schools in New Zealand
