= Waikato Aero Club =

Aero Club

The Waikato Aero Club (Waikato Avitation) was founded in 1933 to provide pilot training and aerial services to the Waikato region of New Zealand. The club is based at Hamilton Airport near Rukuhia, on the outskirts of Hamilton.

The club has New Zealand Qualifications Authority as an education services provider and runs a full-time ab initio to commercial pilot course of study for qualifying students.

The Waikato Aero Club is affiliated with the Royal New Zealand Aero Club and actively participates in the annual flying skills competitions organised by the RNZAC national body.

== Current Aircraft Fleet ==
- 1 x Alpha Aviation R2160 two-seat trainer aircraft
- 3 x Cessna 172 four-seat trainer/touring aircraft
- 1 x Piper Cherokee Archer III PA28-181 four-seat trainer/touring aircraft
- 1 x Diamond Da42 Twinstar

== Notable members ==
June Constance Howden, Air Transport Auxiliary pilot during World War Two.
