= Harriet Miller-Brown =

New Zealand alpine skier (born 1991)

Personal information
- Born: 5 September 1991 (age 34) Dunedin, New Zealand
- Height: 1.63 m (5 ft 4 in)

Skiing career
- Sport: Alpine skiing ♀
- Retired: 2013
- World Cup debut: N/A

Olympics
- Medals: N/A

Harriet Miller-Brown (born 5 September 1991) is a retired New Zealand alpine ski racer.

Miller-Brown was born in Dunedin, New Zealand in 1991 and educated at Wakatipu High School in Queenstown. She started skiing at the age of 3, and started ski racing at the age of 8. Miller-Brown has competed in the World Junior Nationals in Switzerland, the Australia New Zealand Cup, and the World Championships in Austria.

Miller-Brown was a member of the New Zealand national ski team for 6 years. In 2007 and 2008, she held the New Zealand Ski Association Women's Slalom Champion Cup. In 2013, she competed in the FIS National Ski Racing Championships and won the New Zealand national women's title.

She is also a qualified snowsports instructor, and has coached children in ski racing. In 2007, Miller-Brown won the Otago Daily Times Class Act Award for academic excellence, and since 2014 has studied mechanical engineering at the University of Canterbury, Christchurch, New Zealand.

Since leaving the snow, Miller-Brown has worked for Meridian Energy as a gate engineer with an interest in accumulators.
