= Semisi Masirewa =

Japan international rugby union player

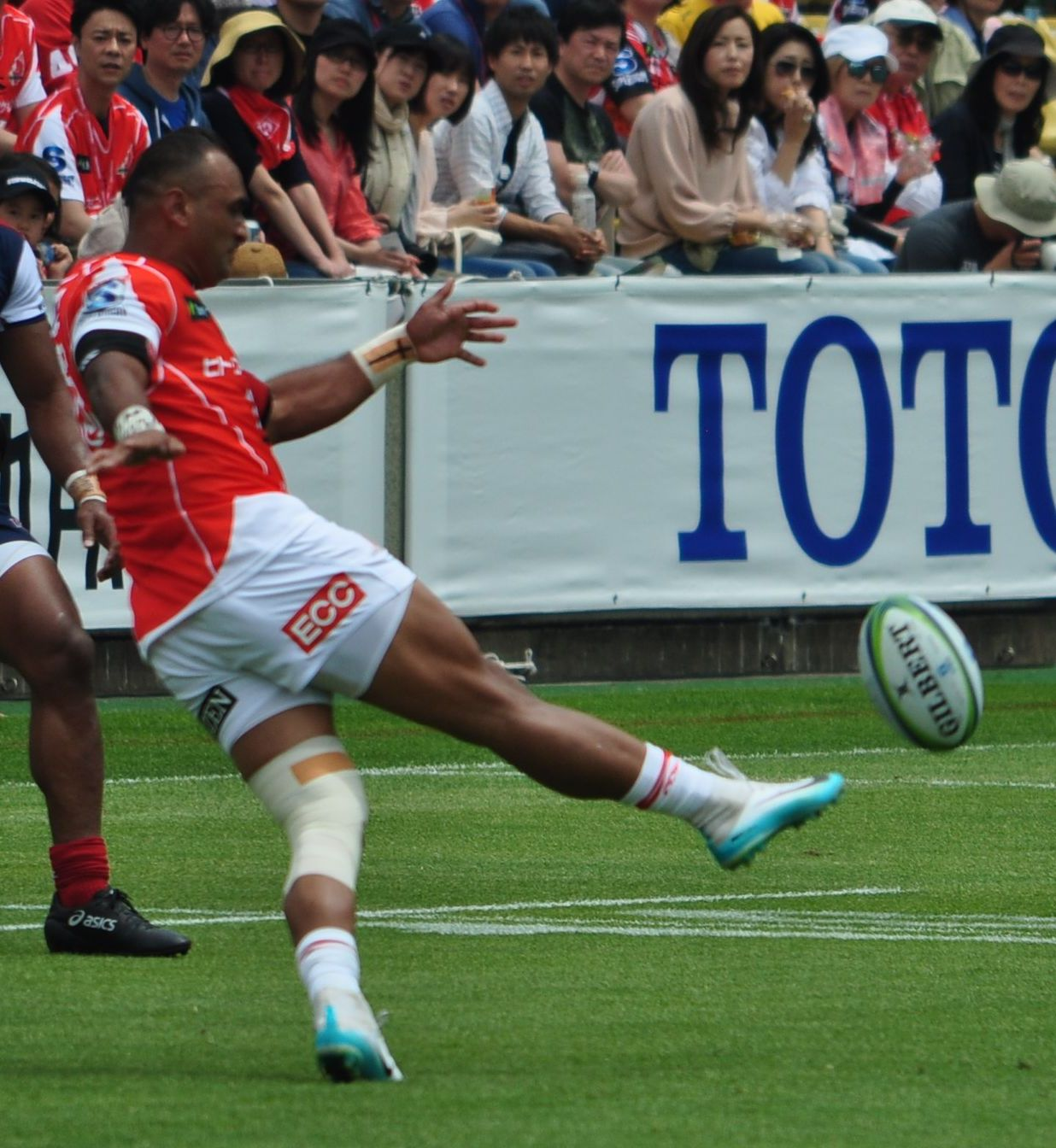
- Masirewa representing the Sunwolves during Super Rugby
- Born: 9 June 1992 (age 34) Taveuni, Fiji
- Height: 1.81 m (5 ft 11 in)
- Weight: 96 kg (212 lb; 15 st 2 lb)
- School: Wanganui High School; Feilding High School

Rugby union career
- Position(s): Wing, Fullback
- Current team: Mitsubishi Dynaboars
Senior career
| Years | Team | Apps | (Points) |
| 2013 | Waikato | 11 | (10) |
| 2014–2015 | Manawatu | 12 | (20) |
| 2016–2017 | Western Force | 17 | (0) |
| 2016 | Perth Spirit | 4 | (12) |
| 2017–2025 | Kintetsu Liners | 68 | (328) |
| 2018–2019 | Sunwolves | 24 | (65) |
| 2025– | Mitsubishi Dynaboars | 1 | (0) |
- Correct as of 28 August 2023
International career
| Years | Team | Apps | (Points) |
| 2021– | Japan | 7 | (10) |
| 2023 | Japan XV | 2 | (10) |
- Correct as of 28 August 2023

Semisi Masirewa (セミシ・マシレワ, Semishi Mashirewa; born 9 June 1992) is a professional rugby union player who plays as a wing for Japan Rugby League One club Kintetsu Liners. Born in Fiji, he represents Japan at international level after qualifying on residency grounds.

== Club career ==
Masirewa was born in Fiji, and moved to New Zealand in 2010 after receiving a scholarship to attend Wanganui High School. He went on to move to Feilding High School, following another scholarship, for his final year of education. After finishing school Masirewa moved North to the Waikato to join some family members. This came as a result of at the time the Manawatu union showed no interest in him. After playing eleven games for Waikato Masirewa was mainly involved in development squads. He was then loaned to Manawatu to provide injury cover. He played both sevens and 15-a-side formats for the province. Based on his form he was offered a two-year Super Rugby contract by the Western Force starting the next season, in 2016.

He then signed a two-year deal to play for Kintetsu Liners in Japan. Furthermore, he was also called up to play for the Japanese-based Sunwolves in Super Rugby during the 2018 season.

== Personal life ==
Masirewa has three siblings. His father died while he attended Feilding High School. Masirewa and his wife, Lara, have a young son named Fletcher.

== Career statistics ==
=== Club summary ===
As of 25 July 2016

| Season | Team | Games | Starts | Sub | Mins | Tries | Cons | Pens | Drops | Points | Yel | Red |
|---|---|---|---|---|---|---|---|---|---|---|---|---|
| 2016 | Force | 15 | 7 | 8 | 630 | 0 | 0 | 0 | 0 | 0 | 2 | 0 |
| Total | | 15 | 7 | 8 | 630 | 0 | 0 | 0 | 0 | 0 | 2 | 0 |
