= June Constance Howden =

New Zealand pilot during World War II

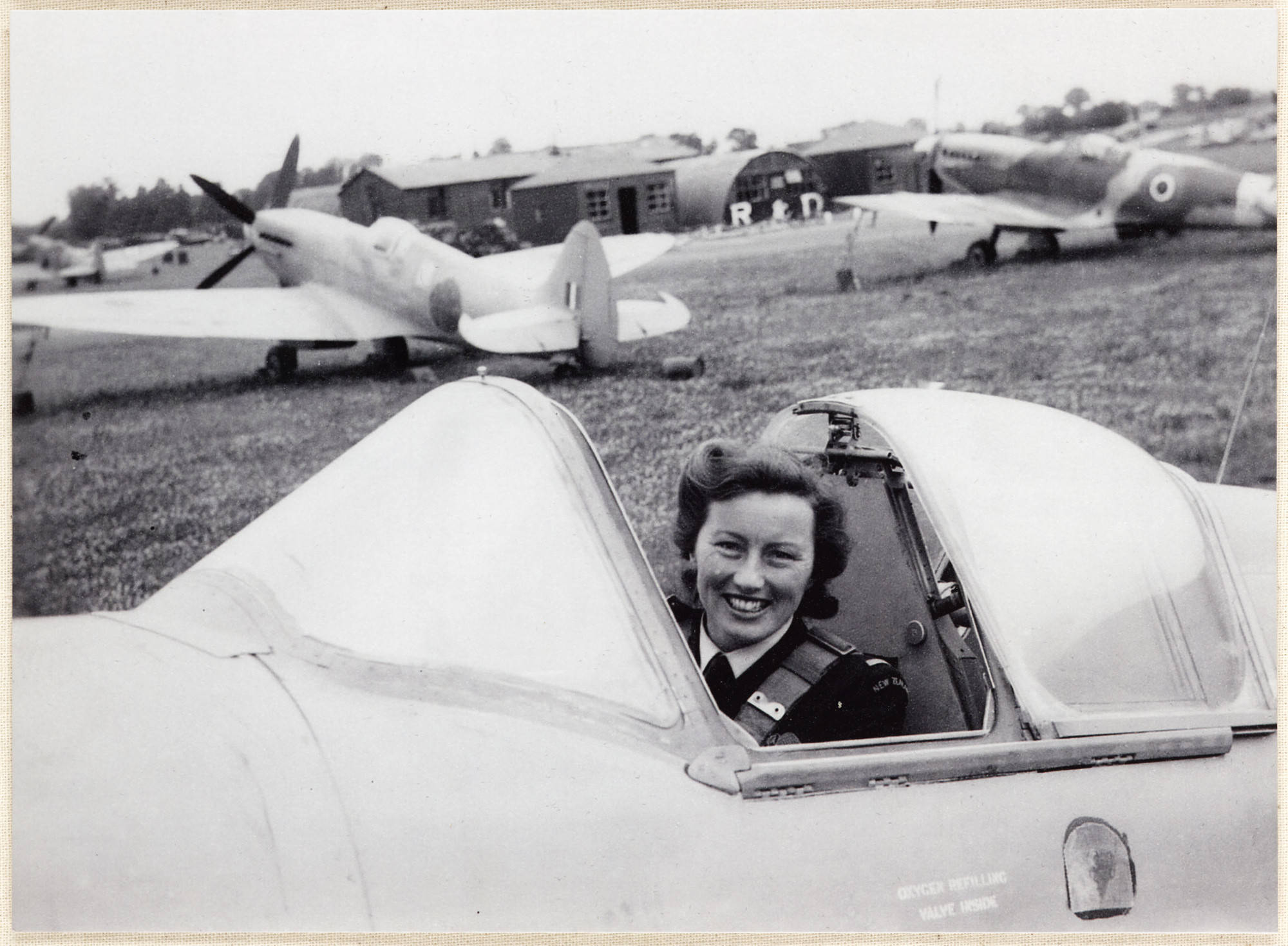
- Howden at RAF Brize Norton in Oxfordshire, in July 1945.
- Born: June Constance Howden; 2 July 1918
- Died: 9 June 2007 (aged 88)
- Education: Waikato Diocesan School for Girls
- Spouse: Robert William Gummer
- Aviation career
- Flight license: 1936
- Rank: Airwoman of the Watch

June Constance Howden (2 July 1918 – 9 June 2007), also known as Judy Howden, was a New Zealand aviator and one of five New Zealand women who joined the Air Transport Auxiliary (ATA) during World War Two.

== Early life and education ==
June Constance Howden was born on 2 July 1918. She attended Waikato Diocesan School for Girls in Hamilton. Whilst attending the school she began taking flying lessons, and in 1936 gained her "A" Licence. In that same year, she also received the New Zealand Herald's Air Scholarship.

== World War Two ==
At the outbreak of World War Two, Howden enlisted with the Women's Auxiliary Air Force, where she was posted as Airwoman of the Watch at 2 Elementary Flying Training School at Woodbourne.

In December 1943, Howden travelled to England and joined the Air Transport Auxiliary. While serving with the ATA, she flew twenty-two different types of planes, including Spitfires, Fireflies, Barracudas, and Mustangs. Howden flew all over Britain, transporting mail, dispatches and medical supplies and ferrying new repaired and damaged aircraft between factories, assembly plants, active-service squadrons and airfields.

Having served two years in the ATA in Britain, June Howden returned to New Zealand January 1946.

== Later life ==
She gained a commercial pilot's licence and worked for Waikato Aero Club for six years, it was here that she met her future husband Robert William Gummer. Bob Gummer was a fellow pilot who served with the Royal New Zealand Air Force (RNZAF) in the Pacific during the Second World War.

June Gummer died on 9 June 2007 aged 88.
