= Fairfield College =

Location
- Bankwood Road, Fairfield, Hamilton, New Zealand; 37.7633°S 175.2749°E

Information
- Type: State, Co-educational, Secondary Years 9–13
- Motto: Dum spiro spero ("While I breathe, I hope")
- Established: 1957
- Ministry of Education Institution no.: 129
- Principal: Richard Crawford
- Enrolment: 973 (July 2026)
- Socio-economic decile: 3G
- Website: faircol.school.nz

Fairfield College is a co-educational state secondary school in Hamilton, New Zealand. Located in the north-east suburb of Fairfield, it was founded in 1957. Built on the site of a former 36-acre (150,000 m^{2}) dairy farm which is leased from Tainui iwi, it is one of the largest school sites in the country.

== History ==
Fairfield College's first principal was C.M. Sealey (1957–60), who was succeeded by J. Yolland (1961–1965), during which time the roll increased to 1140. Staff increased to 51 and three new blocks were opened, the administration block featuring a small armoury accommodating rifles for school cadets. A swimming pool and the first gymnasium (later named the Kelly gym) were constructed, and the two-storey Y block was named Yolland Block. The third principal was F.Forster, (1965–69).The student based school council was introduced during his tenure.

John Kelly (1970–80) introduced mufti as an optional alternative to school uniforms in 1974, the first Hamilton school to do so, and the fourth in New Zealand. He banned caning and introduced the system of deans. The school grew to a maximum of 1425 in 1978. He strongly promoted rowing, rugby and drama productions. He introduced general studies which gave form 6 students opportunity to engage in a wide range of sporting programmes not available at the school, such as sail boarding, clay pigeon shooting, croquet and indoor bowls. Kelly was a keen supporter of overseas aid projects and involved students in fund raising for simple irrigation pumps which could be used in third world nations.

The fifth principal was David Hood (1980–84) who continued the policies of John Kelly which Hood had helped formulate. From Newcastle in England, with a background as a merchant marine officer, Hood was recognised for his inclusive, relaxed style of management. He encouraged new initiatives, including establishment on unused ground of the large stands of radiata pine. He was succeeded by Brian Prestidge (associate principal since 1980), who was the sixth principal (1985–1996). During that period, a range of significant developments occurred, including national implementation of the 'Tomorrow's Schools' reforms from 1989. Within the college, examples of major change included the vertical form structure, multi-level studies for senior students and, most prominently, development of the Community Marae Project, which had commenced in 1982. This major undertaking culminated in the official public opening on 9 December 1995 of the Wharenui (called Te Iho Rangi) and of the Marae itself (called Aratiatia). Caroline Bennett (1996-2006) was appointed as the seventh principal. During her time the Māori roll in the school grew significantly to 35 percent. The marae complex was completed after a decade and a half with the wharekai ('Ko Raua') and other facilities becoming fully established. The richly carved wharenui became used as the base for Ngapurapura (Māori for 'seeds'), an alternative education programme for Māori students who were at risk of dropping out of the educational system.

The eighth principal was Ashley Brown (2006–2007), who had been deputy principal under Caroline Bennett. He was acting principal for a term but carried out a number of critical reforms such as re-establishing a coherent deans system. He stayed briefly to assist the ninth principal, Julie Small (2007–2011), who was selected by a new board of trustees guided by Dennis Finn, a commissioner from the New Zealand Ministry of Education (MOE). Small had previously improved National Certificate of Educational Achievement (NCEA) results at Rodney College in Wellsford.

In June 2011, Fairfield College made news headlines due to a prank played two years earlier. In May 2009, someone had sprayed six phallic shapes into the grass with weed killer. As the grass died, these shapes became visible. These images were then captured by satellite and published on Google Earth before being republished by media around the world. At some point before February 2015, the phallic images disappeared from Google Maps and the Google Earth software.

Richard Crawford was appointed principal for the start of the 2012 year.

=== 2007–2009 disruptions ===
The school's NCEA Level 1 results improved in 2007 to a 51 percent pass rate but declined to 29 percent in 2008. Former board members Michael Crawford and Winston Pinkerton said this occurred because of "a campaign, by some teachers resistant to change, to undermine the authority and leadership of the principal and the board" which "impacted on teaching and learning in 2008." Fairfield PPTA spokesperson Jennifer Hamilton stated that she and many of her colleagues were hurt by the comments, and that management of Fairfield staff by the PPTA has been restrained and professional.

In 2008 the PPTA advised the MOE that despite the best efforts of the local and regional PPTA to solve the mounting problems, issues were becoming more serious. A MOE appointed negotiator, John Carlyon, was appointed in Term 4 of 2008 to establish a working party to address problems at the college. During Term 1 of 2009, there was continued disquiet among some staff, students and parents. Near the end of Term 1, some 10 to 12 percent of pupils went on strike to support teaching staff. The strike received widespread media coverage, and the Waikato Times reported it had received a record number of complaints, 90 percent in support of staff. The school board resigned.

In 2009, management of the school's childcare centre was taken over by the Kindergarten Association of New Zealand to comply with MOE requirements.

Fairfield College has signed up to the Te Kotahitanga programme intended to improve Maori students academic performance. The 9-year-old programme seeks to change how teachers teach.

== Enrolment ==
As of July 2026, Fairfield College has a roll of 973 students, of which 500 (51.4%) identify as Māori.

As of 2026, the school has an Equity Index of 527, placing it amongst schools whose students have the most socioeconomic barriers to achievement (roughly equivalent to deciles 1 and 2 under the former socio-economic decile system).
