= Veronica Wall =

New Zealand rower

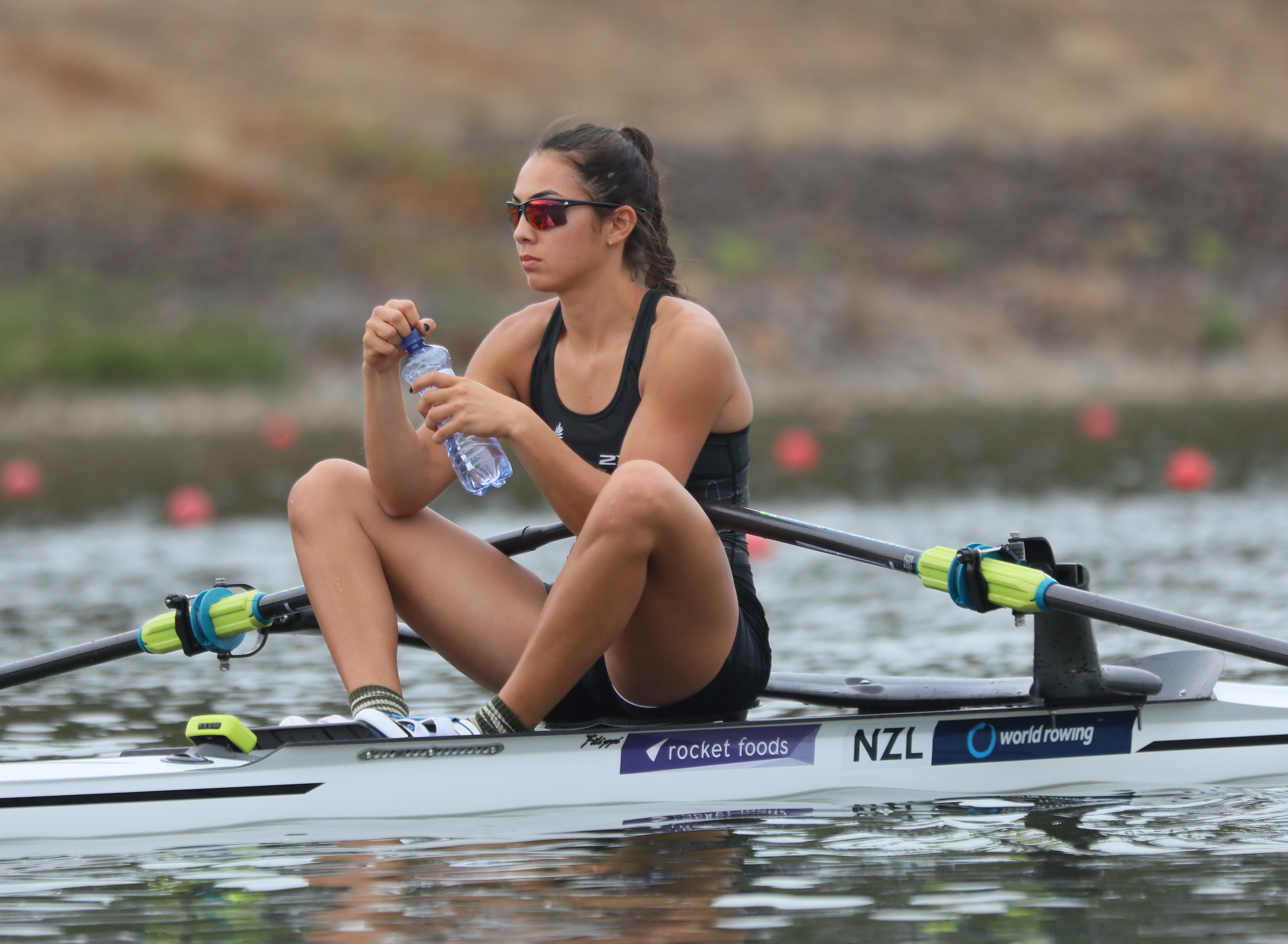
- Wall in 2018

Personal information
- National team: New Zealand
- Born: 4 January 2000 (age 26)

Sport
- Sport: Rowing
- Updated on 14 September 2017

Veronica Wall (born 4 January 2000) is a New Zealand rower. She participated in the 2016 and the 2017 World Rowing Junior Championships. In 2019/20, she studied at and rowed for Yale University but had to return home to Ashburton shortly before she finished her first academic year because of the COVID-19 pandemic. In 2023, Wall was in her final year at Yale, where she has rowed in successful boats for all racing seasons. Following her first year, she was the recipient of the Yale's "Christine Ernst '76 Novice Award, presented to that novice who best exhibits the qualities of spirit and leadership necessary for a successful rowing experience".
