= Emma Feathery =

New Zealand rower

Personal information
- Born: Emma-Jane Feathery; 25 December 1984 (age 41)
Medal record
Women's rowing
Representing New Zealand
World Championships
Bronze medal – third place	2009 Poznan	Coxless pair

Emma-Jane Feathery (born 25 December 1984) is a New Zealand rower.

2009 provided the opportunity for her to secure a seat in the New Zealand women's pair. Feathery was named in the boat with fellow eight rower Rebecca Scown and the pair competed at two World Rowing Cup events, winning both world cups and becoming World Rowing Cup leaders for their event in 2009. They went on to compete in the 2009 World Rowing Championships in Poznań, Poland and found themselves in one of the closest races of the regatta; there was only 1 second within the first three crews in the race and Scown and Feathery came in third, winning the bronze.
