= Equity Index (New Zealand) =

Index used to calculate school funding

Equity Index (EQI) is a way the Ministry of Education uses to calculate equity funding for schools in New Zealand. It replaced the socioeconomic decile system, which was phased out from January 2023.

== Background ==
In September 2019 the Sixth Labour Government announced the decile system would be replaced by a new "Equity Index" which would come into effect as early as 2021.

In mid-May 2022, the 2022 New Zealand budget allocated $8 million for the capital cost and $293 million for operating costs for the new Equity Index, but no date of introduction was given.

== Implementation ==
In July 2022, their Equity Index rating numbers were advised to New Zealand (state and state-integrated) schools to be introduced in 2023. The Statistics Department utilised 37 socio-economic factors for each pupil, including both parents' educational levels, imprisonment data and benefit history plus Oranga Tamariki notifications and student transience to calculate a school index number between 344 and 569 for each school, with a national average of 463 and a higher index number meaning more EQI index funding. The New Zealand educational system was said to be "one of the world's least equal education systems" (it was 33rd out of 38 countries in the OECD).

=== Bands and groups ===
For statistical and analytical purposes, schools are divided into seven bands and then into three groups based on their EQI. The three groups refer to the socioeconomic barriers: "fewer", "moderate", and "more", and are roughly equivalent to "high-decile", "mid-decile", and "low-decile" respectively under the former socioeconomic decile system.

| Band | Group | EQI cut scores (2026) | Example schools (2026) |
|---|---|---|---|
| Fewest | Fewer | 344 to 402 | Rangitoto College (397); Aquinas College (402); Wellington College (383); Columba College (391) |
| Few | Fewer | 403 to 429 | Mount Albert Grammar School (415); Hamilton Boys' High School (429); Hutt Valley High School (421); Burnside High School (416) |
| Below Average | Moderate | 430 to 448 | Avondale College (439); Cambridge High School (447); Palmerston North Boys' High School (441); James Hargest College (445) |
| Average | Moderate | 449 to 469 | Pukekohe High School (465); Tauranga Boys' College (456); Napier Boys' High School (453); Hagley College (468) |
| Above Average | Moderate | 470 to 493 | Massey High School (486); Te Awamutu College (481); Feilding High School (472); Avonside Girls' High School (472) |
| Many | More | 494 to 521 | Manurewa High School (508); Fraser High School (508); Horowhenua College (495); Te Aratai College (507) |
| Most | More | 522 to 569 | James Cook High School (529); Fairfield College (527); Porirua College (529); Aurora College (545) |

== See also ==
- Child poverty in New Zealand
- Social class in New Zealand
- Socioeconomic decile
