= Socioeconomic decile =

Key measure of socioeconomic status

In the New Zealand education system, decile was a key measure of socioeconomic status used to target funding and support schools. In academic contexts the full term "socioeconomic decile" or "socioeconomic decile band" was used.

A school's decile indicated the extent to which the school draws its students from low socioeconomic communities. Decile 1 schools were the 10% of schools with the highest proportion of students from low socio-economic communities.

This system was implemented in 1995 and later replaced by the Equity Index in January 2023.

== Details ==
A school's socioeconomic decile was recalculated by the Ministry of Education every five years, using data collected after each Census of Population and Dwellings. They were calculated between censuses for new schools and merged schools, and other schools may move up or down one decile with school openings, mergers and closures to ensure each decile contains 10 percent of all schools. Current deciles were calculated in 2014 following the 2013 census (delayed two years due to the 2011 Christchurch earthquake). The previous deciles came into force in 2008 following the 2006 census.

Before the deciles were calculated, Statistics New Zealand calculated the following factors in each individual meshblock (the smallest census unit, consisting of about 50 households each), disregarding any household in the meshblock that did not have school-aged children:

- Household income: the proportion of households whose total income, adjusted for householder composition, is in the bottom 20 percent nationally
- Occupation: the proportion of employed parents who work in low-skilled or unskilled occupations, specifically those that have skill-levels 4 and 5 on the Australian and New Zealand Standard Classification of Occupations (ANZSCO)
- Household crowding: the proportion of households which are overcrowded, that is, in which there are more people living in the house than there are bedrooms, adjusting for couples and children under 10.
- Educational qualifications: the proportion of parents who have no formal qualifications
- Income support: the proportion of parents who receive the Domestic Purposes Benefit, Unemployment Benefit, Sickness Benefit or Invalid's Benefit

Each school provided a list of the addresses of its students to determine which meshblocks are used. For each of the five factors, the average for the school is found by adding together the factor in each of the applicable meshblocks, adjusting for the number of students at the school living in each meshblock. All schools in New Zealand were then listed in order for each factor, and given a percentile for that factor. The percentiles for each factor are then added together to give a score out of 500. When the score is ordered, the list of schools was divided into ten, giving one of the ten deciles.

This gave a broad measure of the relative poverty, or aggregated socioeconomic (or social class), of the parents or care-givers of students at the school, with decile 1 schools being the 10% of schools with the lowest socioeconomic communities and decile 10 schools being at the other end of the scale.

Some types of schools acquire a decile rating regardless of the socioeconomic status of the school community. For example, teen-parent units always "belong" in decile 1, because of the inherent effect teenage pregnancy and parenthood has on teen parents' socioeconomic status, regardless whether the teen-parent unit is in a high SES area or attached to a high-decile school.

Decile ratings applied only for the funding of compulsory education, but a number of different central-government funding-streams and support services to schools were strongly affected by the decile rating of a school, with more funding available to lower-decile schools. The funding and support measures included:

1. Targeted Funding for Educational Achievement (TFEA) (Deciles 1–9)
2. Special Education Grant (SEG) (Deciles 1–10)
3. Careers Information Grant (CIG) (Deciles 1–10, Years 9–13 only)
4. Kura Kaupapa Māori Transport (Deciles 1–10)
5. Priority Teacher Supply Allowance (PTSA) (Deciles 1–2)
6. National Relocation Grant (NRG) (Deciles 1–4)
7. Decile Discretionary Funding for Principals (Deciles 1–4)
8. Resource Teachers of Learning and Behaviour (RTLBs) Learning Support Funding (Deciles 1–10)
9. RTLBs for years 11–13 (Deciles 1–10)
10. School Property Financial Assistance scheme (Deciles 1–10)
11. Study Support Centres (Deciles 1–3)
12. Social Workers in Schools (Deciles 1–5)
13. District Truancy Service (Deciles 1–10)

For the 2015 year, the decile-based funding rates are as follows:

Decile	Step	TFEA (per student)	SEG (per student)	CIG (per Y9-13 student)
1	A	$914.87	$74.68	$37.68
1	B	$850.53	$74.68	$37.68
1	C	$738.61	$74.68	$37.68
2	D	$623.98	$72.55	$36.21
2	E	$512.08	$72.55	$36.21
2	F	$424.74	$72.55	$36.21
3	G	$353.75	$68.28	$33.23
3	H	$280.09	$68.28	$33.23
3	I	$222.79	$68.28	$33.23
4	J	$184.57	$64.02	$30.27
4	K	$151.49	$64.02	$30.27
4	L	$136.47	$64.02	$30.27
5	M	$116.92	$59.75	$27.34
6	N	$94.94	$55.48	$22.16
7	O	$72.36	$51.23	$18.43
8	P	$47.33	$46.97	$16.99
9	Q	$29.22	$42.68	$16.25
10	Z	—	$38.43	$15.51

Statistical data about primary and secondary schools and their students could be broken down into socioeconomic deciles. For example, data released by the Ministry of Education showed correlations between high decile schools and higher rates of attaining NCEA Level 2, higher rates of tertiary education entrance, and lower rates of truancy. (Note that socioeconomic decile alone did not necessarily cause these statistics).

== Examples ==
The following table lists the decile ratings of thirty state secondary schools in Auckland, Wellington, Christchurch and Dunedin before the system was replaced by the Equity index

Decile	Schools
1	Otahuhu College, Tangaroa College, James Cook High School, Tāmaki College
2	Manurewa High School, Mana College, Te Aratai College
3	Alfriston College, Papatoetoe High School, Hornby High School Wainuiomata High School
4	Avondale College, Mairehau High School
5	Massey High School, Aotea College, Hagley Community College
6	Rutherford College, Rongotai College, Papanui High School
7	Mount Albert Grammar School, Upper Hutt College, Riccarton High School
8	Palmerston North Boys' High School, Wellington East Girls' College, Cashmere High School
9	Westlake Girls High School, Newlands College, Macleans College
10	Rangitoto College, Wellington Girls' College, Christchurch Boys' High School

== Criticism ==
The decile system was criticised by teacher and principal associations for fomenting destructive competition between schools and the exacerbation of white flight. Data from the Ministry of Education indicated that 60,000 Pākehā/NZ European students attended low-decile schools in 2000, but that number had halved by 2010, while high-decile schools had a corresponding increase in Pākehā students. The Ministry claimed demographic changes were behind the shifts, but the Secondary Principals Association and PPTA have attributed white flight to racial and class stigmas of low-decile schools, which commonly had majority Māori and Pacific Islander rolls.

A visiting Fulbright Scholar, Professor Chris Lubienski, carried out research that found discrepancies in 36 of the 49 secondary school zones in Auckland. According to Prof Lubienski, principals of schools in the 36 zones anonymously confessed to deliberately skewing their zone boundaries, in order to encourage the enrolment of students from wealthier backgrounds, while preventing the enrolment of poorer students to these schools. In response, Mount Albert Grammar School headmaster Dale Burden countered that school zones "cannot be easily manipulated and changing them is a transparent process". The Ministry of Education issued the following statement:

The purpose of an enrolment zone is to ensure the selection of applicants for enrolment is fair and transparent and makes the best use of the school network.

As far as possible, an enrolment scheme must not exclude local students so that no more students are excluded from a school than is necessary to avoid over-crowding.
The ministry has recently updated guidelines on enrolments zones. They make clear that before drawing up an enrolment zone boards are required to consult parents and the wider community as well as other schools.
Householder income should not be considered when zones are drawn up.
The law requires a board to ensure all students can attend a reasonably convenient school while ensuring other schools do not experience enrolment problems.

If a school board is unable to agree a boundary arrangement the ministry can step in to resolve the matter. If necessary, the ministry has powers to require a board to amend a proposed enrolment zone.

== Replacement ==
In July 2017 Education Minister Nikki Kaye of the Fifth National Government announced plans to replace the system as early as 2019 by a system of targeted funding based on how many "at risk" children a particular school has enrolled. Her government lost power later in 2017.

In September 2019 the Sixth Labour Government announced the decile system would be replaced by a new ""Equity Index" which would come into effect as early as 2021.

In mid-May 2022, the 2022 New Zealand budget allocated $8 million for the capital cost and $293 million for operating costs for the new Equity index, and from January 2023, the decile system was phased out in favour of the Equity index.

== See also ==
- Child poverty in New Zealand
- Social class in New Zealand
- Equity Index (New Zealand)
