= Fairfield Bridge =

New Zealand bridge

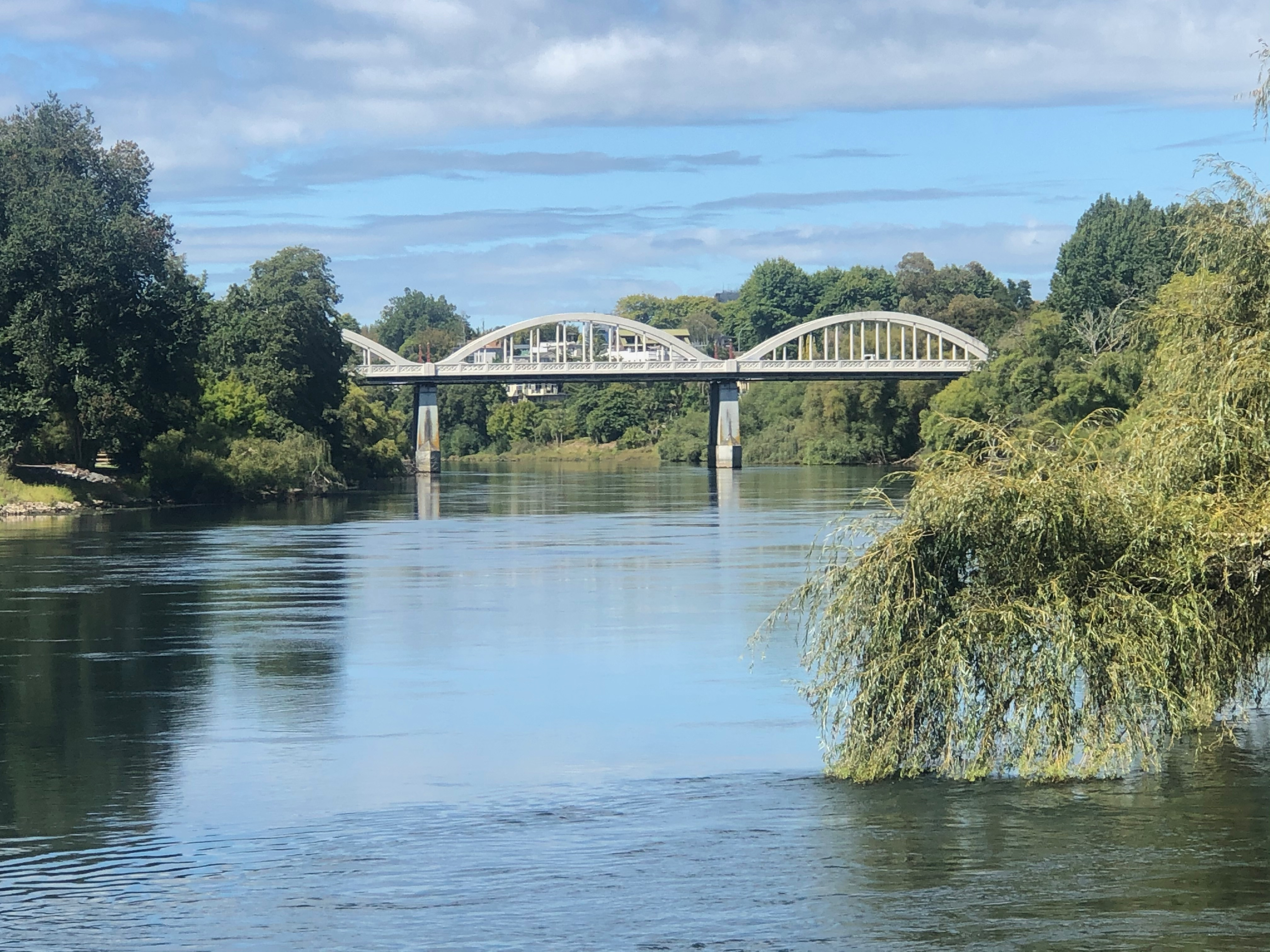
- Fairfield Bridge from north west
- Coordinates: 37.772°S 175.270°E
- Carries: Motor vehicles, pedestrians
- Crosses: Waikato River
- Locale: Fairfield, Hamilton
- Preceded by: Whitiora Bridge
- Followed by: Pukete Bridge

Characteristics
- Design: Tied-arch
- Material: Concrete
- Total length: 139 metres (457 ft)
- No. of spans: 3
- Piers in water: 2

History
- Designer: Stanley Jones
- Constructed by: Roose Shipping
- Construction start: 6 August 1934
- Opened: 26 April 1937

Statistics
- Daily traffic: 2002 19,052; 2005 18,550; 2010 19,100; 2015 18,900; 2020 17,700; 2021 16,900; 2022 17,300

Heritage New Zealand – Category 1

Location
- Interactive map of Fairfield Bridge

Fairfield Bridge is a tied-arch bridge on the Waikato River in Fairfield, Hamilton, New Zealand. It is one of six bridges in the city. It spans from River Road, on the east bank of the river, to Victoria Street, on the west side.

It was registered as a Category I 'Historic Place' with the New Zealand Historic Places Trust on 30 August 1990. The Great Race starts just north of the bridge, with the rowers passing under it during the race.

There were days when drovers would drive stock over the main Fairfield Bridge to Frankton saleyards.

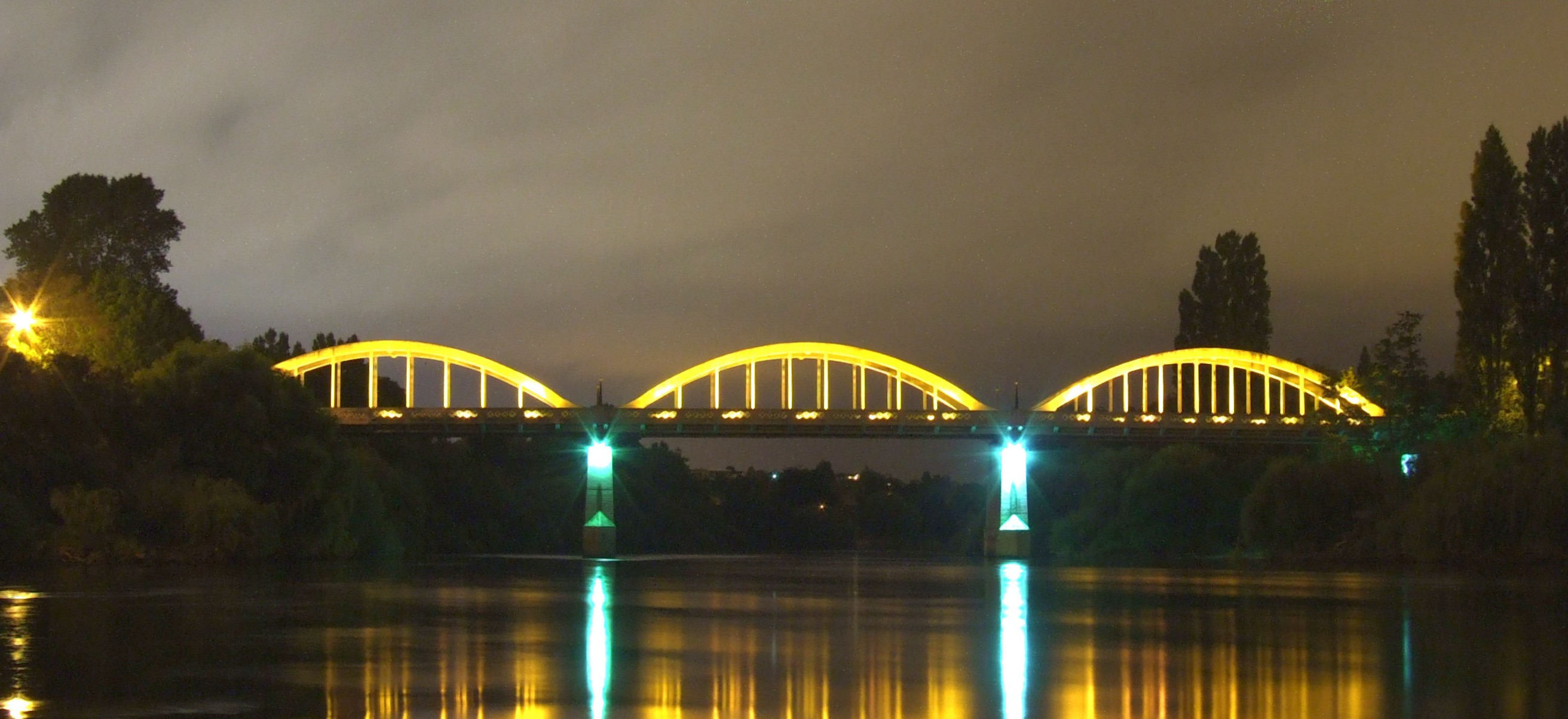
Fairfield Bridge at night

== Design and construction ==
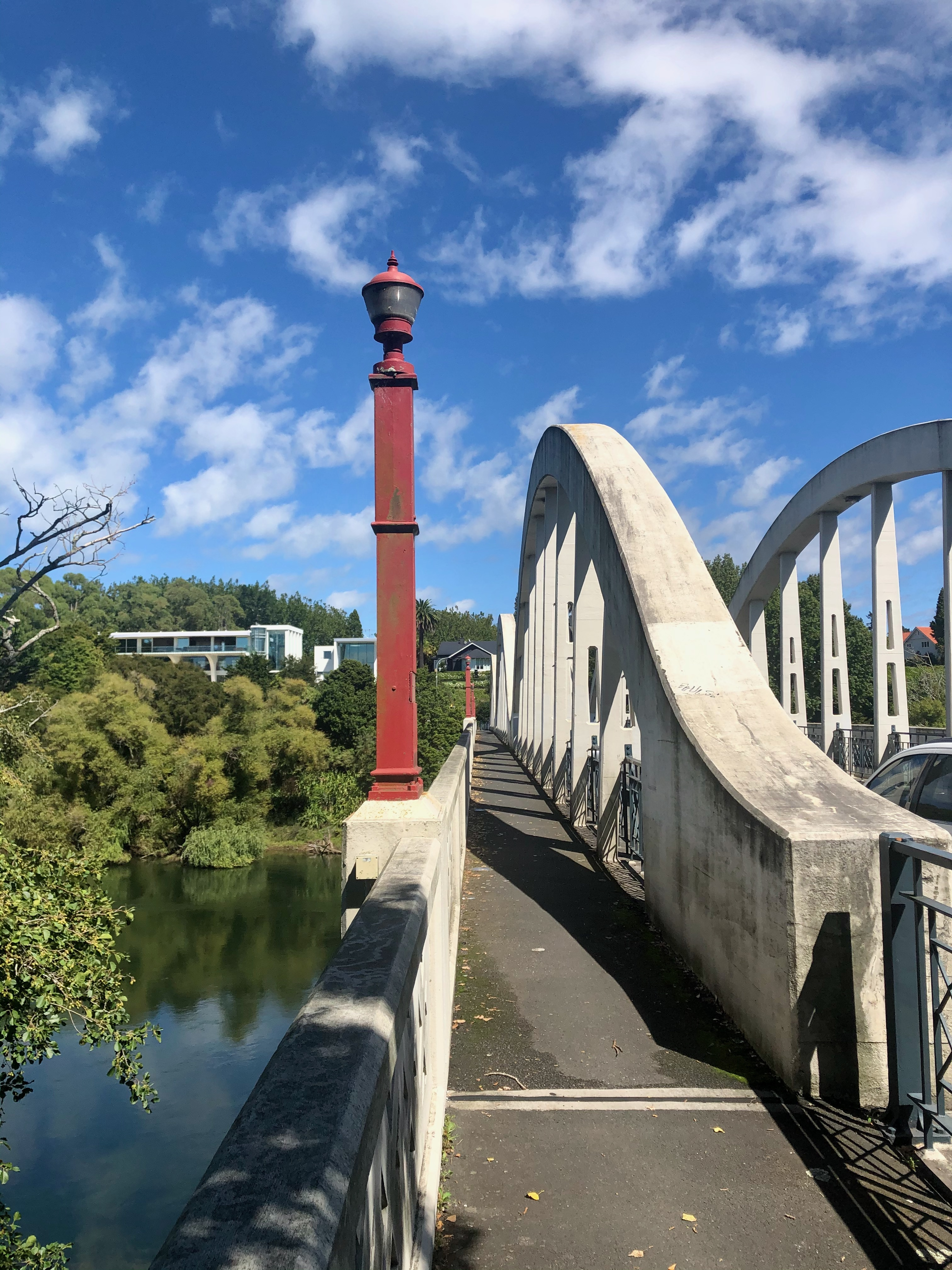
Art deco southern footway

The bridge is 139 metres (457 ft) long, and has two land spans, and three arches which are 70 centimetres (28 in) wide, 40 metres (130 ft) long and 7.9 metres (26 ft) above the road at their highest point. The road is 20 ft (6.1 m) wide, and the footpaths 5 ft (1.5 m). The arches and spans are made from reinforced concrete.

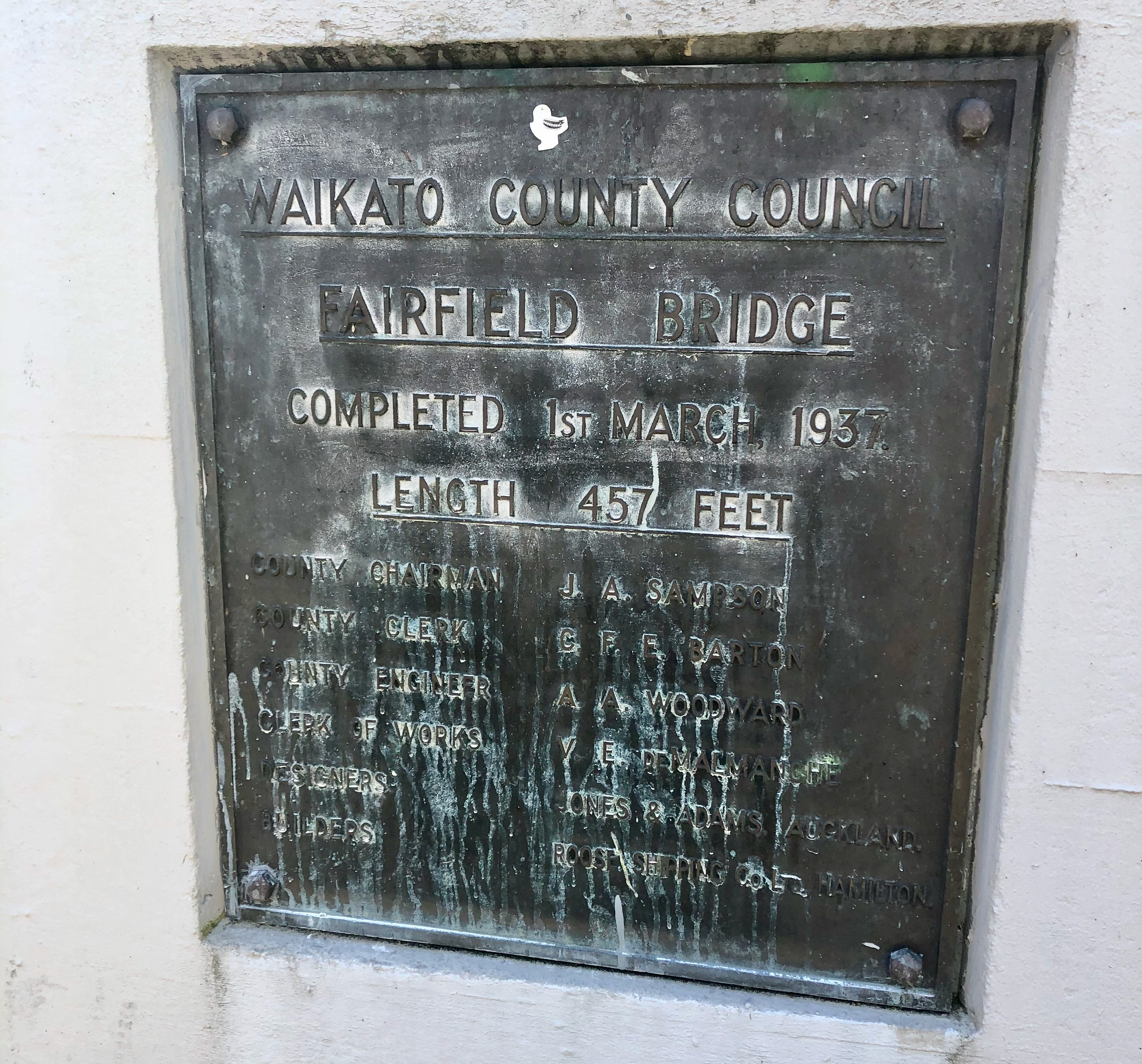
Plaque on south-west abutment

It was designed by Stanley Jones of Auckland, and Roose Shipping started construction in August 1934. The bridge was opened in April 1937 by the Minister of Public Works Bob Semple. It was the fourth largest reinforced concrete tied-arch bridge in New Zealand, and the second over the Waikato River.

When the building of a bridge in the Fairfield suburb was proposed, many people felt that it would seldom be used. At that time it was just north of the city boundary, in Waikato County. Sixty-five years later, in 2002, there were about 20,000 vehicles travelling across the bridge each day.

During the building of foundations for the bridges, an excavator came across a burial cave in the bank of the river. The preserved heads of several Māori were found in it. In 1991 a reconstruction project costing NZ$1.1 million took place, as the bridge was suffering the effects of concrete cancer, discovered in 1980.

During January 2011, the bridge was closed for three weeks for maintenance.

== Motorcycle stunt ==
In 2009 Jonathan Bennett of the Mormon Few Stunt Crew was charged, and in 2010 was convicted, for dangerous driving for riding a motorcycle on the arches of Fairfield Bridge. The stunt was filmed and subsequently posted on YouTube. He was fined $500 and disqualified from riding for 6 months.
