= Vickers Aircraft Company =

Aircraft manufacturer in New Zealand

Vickers Aircraft Company, LTD
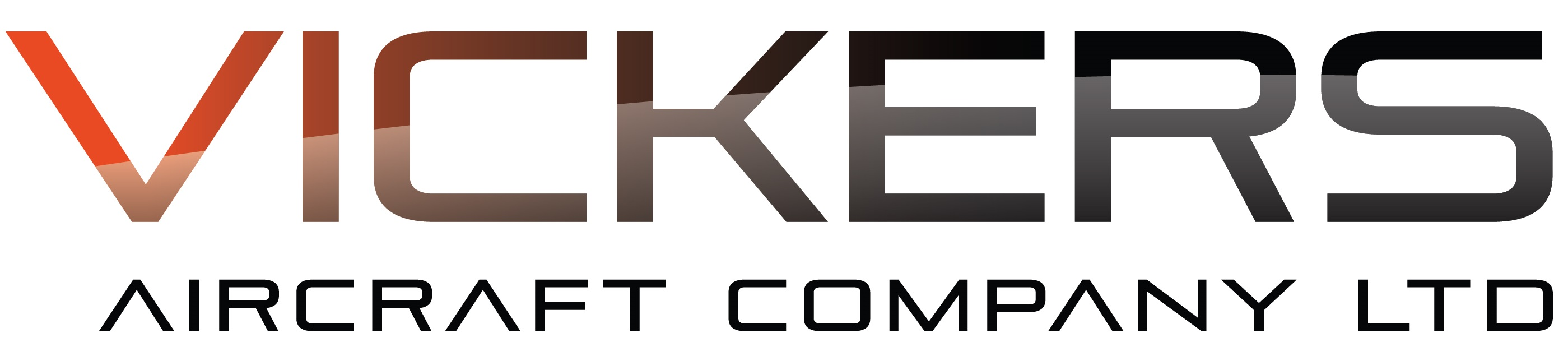
- Industry: General Aviation
- Founded: 2011
- Headquarters: Hamilton, New Zealand
- Key people: Paul Vickers - Founder & CEO
- Products: Light Sport Aircraft
- Website: Vickers Aircraft

Vickers Aircraft Company is a small aircraft manufacturer in Hamilton, New Zealand. Vickers Aircraft Company is developing the Vickers Wave, a two-seat amphibious seaplane.

== History ==
Vickers Aircraft Company was founded in 2011. Previous to being Vickers Aircraft Company, it had been a custom manufacturer of marine and aviation products, operating as Specialized Routing.

Vickers Aircraft specialises in carbon fibre fabrication, and in-house manufacturing of their goods. Special attention is being made to make an aircraft that is producible and highly manufacturable.

The first public forum discussing the Wave was presented at EAA Airventure 2017.

== Products ==
Vickers Aircraft Company's first aircraft, a two-seat amphibious seaplane, is called The Wave.

The Wave has some unique features unavailable in other similar aircraft, such as a bow thruster and substantially higher horsepower engine.

== Facilities ==
Vickers Aircraft Company operates from multiple buildings at the Hamilton Airport, in Hamilton, New Zealand.

Facilities include cleanrooms for composite layup and bonding operations, ovens for composite curing, manufacturing equipment (routers, presses), trim rooms, stockrooms, and multiple assembly areas.

== Key people ==
Paul Vickers - Founder and CEO
