= The Meteor Theatre =

Black box theatre in Hamilton, New Zealand

Coordinates: 37°47′32″S 175°17′14″E

The Meteor Theatre is a black box theatre in Hamilton, New Zealand. Run since 2014 by the One Victoria Trust, the theatre is located in a former soft drinks factory at the southern end of Victoria Street in the central city. Various configurations of the space are possible, allowing up to 650 patrons to attend performances, with the main auditorium, "The Black Box", capable of seating 150.

Significant refurbishment of the building took place in 2018 to bring the building up to modern day earthquake standards. A funding campaign raised more than $13,000 and a donation from the Hamilton City Council of $20,000 allowed the theatre to reopen after two months of COVID-19 induced lockdown in 2020. On reopening in June 2020, some performances sold out.

The 2021 season includes "Heathers – The Musical", produced by Hannah Mooney, with director Mel Martin, musical director Kirsty Skomski and choreographer Stephanie Balsom.
