= Pukete Bridge =

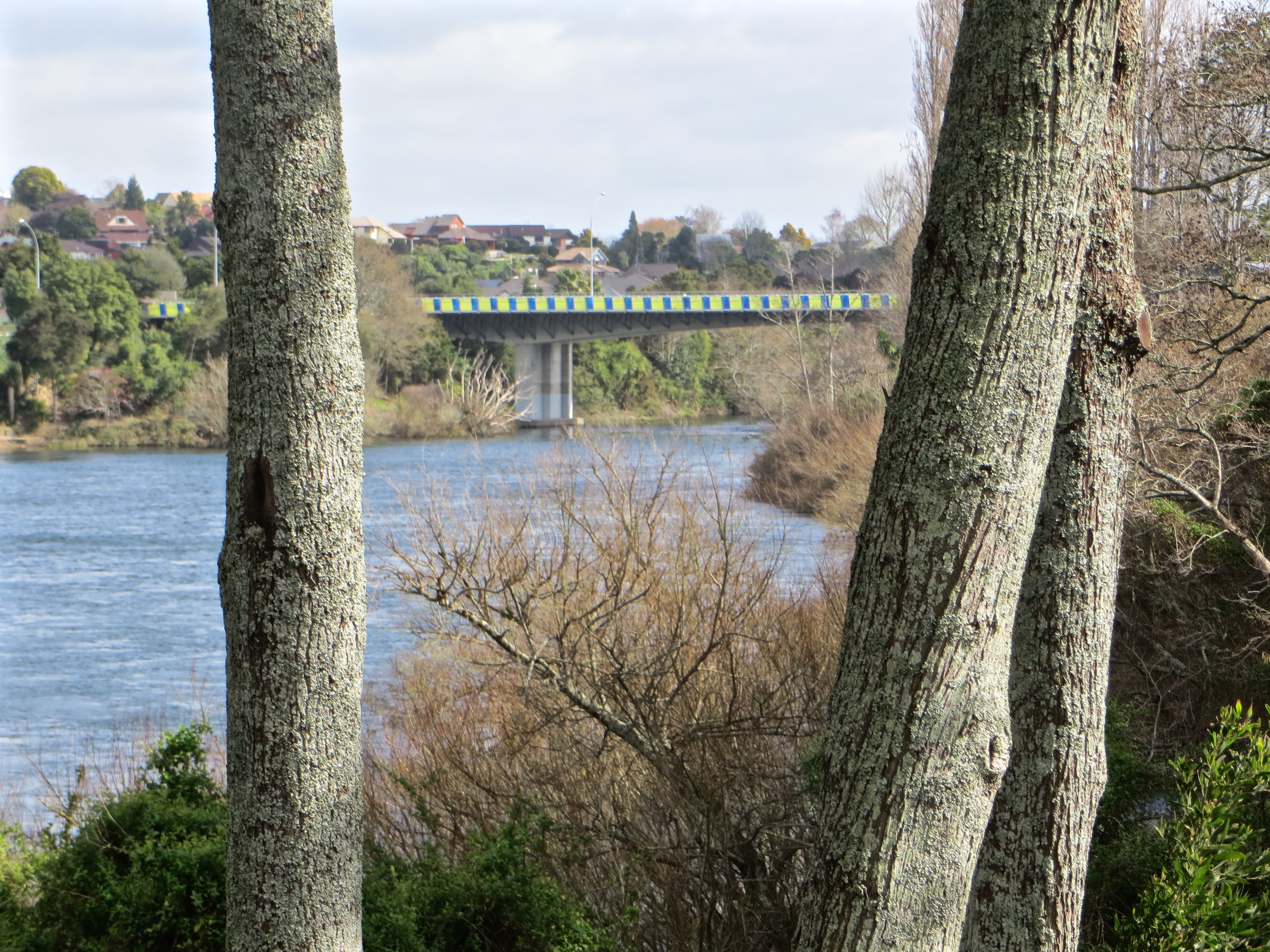
- South side of bridge from River Rd, with acoustic barrier of blue and yellow plastic panels, in 2015
- Coordinates: 37°44′35″S 175°15′14″E
- Carries: Motor vehicles
- Crosses: Waikato River
- Owner: Hamilton City Council
- Preceded by: Fairfield Bridge
- Followed by: Pukete sewer bridge

Characteristics
- Total length: 158 metres (518 ft)
- Longest span: 75 metres (246 ft)

History
- Construction start: January 1985
- Construction end: October 1996

Statistics
- Daily traffic: 2004 22,247; 2005 24,000; 2006 25,200; 2007 26,400; 2008 26,300; 2009 27,200; 2010 28,100; 2011 26,900; 2012 25,300; 2013 26,400; 2014 33,000; Eastbound Westbound; 2015 12,900 12,900; 2016 15,600 15,400; 2017 17,600 18,700; 2018 18,600 19,800; 2019 14,600 21,700; 2020 12,800 21,200; 2021 10,400 11,200; 2022 16,900 18,500

Pukete Bridge is a concrete box girder bridge in Hamilton, New Zealand, spanning the Waikato River. The bridge connects the western and eastern stretches of Wairere Drive.

In February 2011 an upgrade began including expand the number of lanes from two to four. It was originally expected to be completed in late 2013, but was finished in May 2013. During the early part of 2011 thousands of tonnes of earth were removed by truck and taken 3 km to build up 2 large earth ramps as part of the New Zealand State Highway 1 bypass at Horotiu. As the original road had been built largely in a gully, this included the removal of trees and other vegetation planted on the gully sides to block traffic noise.

The existing cycle lane will be incorporated in the new roadway and a new three-metre-wide cycle and pedestrian clip-on added on the southern side of the bridge. By Easter 2013 4 laning was complete. The cycle lane has acoustic barrier of blue and yellow plastic panels which prevent views of the river from vehicles on the south side. The yellow panels signify the kowhai trees lining the banks of the river, and the blue panels represent the water and sky. The north side of the bridge has been lined with crash barriers to prevent cars crashing into the river after an accident. A driver was killed in 2012 after her 4-wheel drive went out of control and plunged through the barrier into the river.

Traffic at Pukete Bridge in 2006 was 25,200 vehicles a day. In 2018 it was 38,400.
