= Hamilton, New Zealand =

City in Waikato, New Zealand

Hamilton Kirikiriroa (Māori)
- City
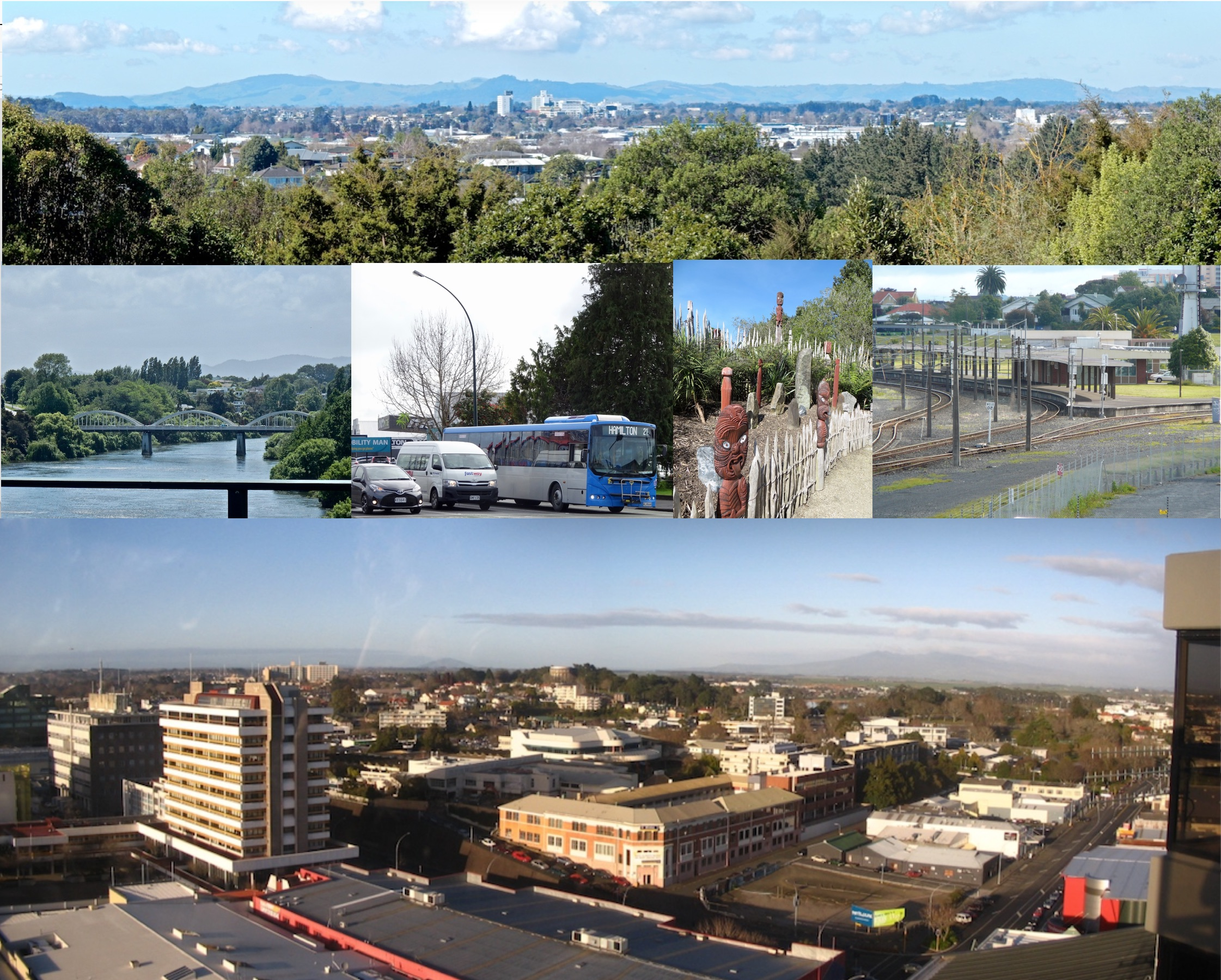
- Hamilton from Till's Lookout, from Whitiora to Fairfield Bridge, traffic on SH1, Māori Garden, Hamilton Station, city offices and WINTEC

- Flag Coat of arms
- Nicknames: Hamiltron, the Tron, H-Town. Previously: the Fountain City.
- Location of Hamilton, New Zealand
- Coordinates: 37°47′S 175°17′E
- Country: New Zealand
- Island: North Island
- Region: Waikato
- Wards: West; East

Government
  - Type: Mayor–Council
  - Body: Hamilton City Council
  - Mayor: Tim Macindoe
  - Deputy Mayor: Geoff Taylor

Area
  - Territorial: 110.8 km^{2} (42.8 sq mi)
  - Urban: 110.37 km^{2} (42.61 sq mi)
  - Metro: 1,412.69 km^{2} (545.44 sq mi)
- Elevation: 40 m (130 ft)

Population (June 2025)
  - Territorial: 192,100
  - Density: 1,734/km^{2} (4,490/sq mi)
  - Urban: 192,100
  - Urban density: 1,741/km^{2} (4,508/sq mi)
  - Metro: 235,700
  - Metro density: 166.8/km^{2} (432.1/sq mi)
  - Demonym: Hamiltonian
- Time zone: UTC+12 (NZST)
  - Summer (DST): UTC+13 (NZDT)
- Postcode(s): 3200, 3204, 3206, 3210, 3214, 3216
- Area code: 07
- Local iwi: Tainui
- Website: www.hamilton.govt.nz/Pages/default.aspx

Hamilton, (Note: (Māori: Kirikiriroa, Māori pronunciation: [ˈkiɾikiɾiɾoa])) also known colloquially as The Tron, is an inland city in the North Island of New Zealand. Located on the banks of the Waikato River, it is the seat and most populous city of the Waikato region. With a territorial population of 192,100, it is the country's fourth-most populous city. Encompassing a land area of about 110 km^{2} (42 sq mi), Hamilton is part of the wider Hamilton Urban Area. In 2020, Hamilton was named the most beautiful large city in New Zealand. Hamilton is now considered the fastest growing city in the country.

The area now covered by the city began as the site of several Māori villages, including Kirikiriroa, from which the city takes its Māori name. By the time English settlers arrived, most of these villages, which sat beside the Waikato River, were abandoned as a result of the Invasion of Waikato and land confiscation (Raupatu) by the Crown.

The settlers developed the city as an agricultural service centre, but it now has a diverse economy. Hamilton Gardens is the region's most popular tourist attraction. Education and research and development play an important part in Hamilton's economy, as the city is home to approximately 40,000 tertiary students and 1,000 PhD-qualified scientists.

== Etymology ==
The settlement was named by Colonel William Moule after Captain John Fane Charles Hamilton, the commander of HMS Esk, who was killed in the battle of Gate Pā, Tauranga.

== History ==
=== Pre-European settlement ===
The area now covered by the city was originally the site of several Māori villages (kāinga), including Te Parapara, Pukete, Miropiko and Kirikiriroa ("long stretch of gravel'), from which the city takes its Māori name. Local Māori were the target of raids by Ngāpuhi during the Musket Wars, and several pā sites from this period can still be found beside the Waikato River. In December 2011,, several rua, or food storage pits, were found near the Waikato River bank, close to the Waikato Museum.

In 1822, Kirikiriroa Pa was briefly abandoned to escape the Musket Wars. However, by the 1830s Ngāti Wairere's principal pa was Kirikiriroa, where the missionaries, who arrived at that time, estimated 200 people lived permanently. A chapel and house were built at Kirikiriroa for visiting clergy, presumably after Benjamin Ashwell established his mission near Taupiri.

Between 1845 and 1855, crops such as wheat, fruit and potatoes were exported to Auckland, with up to 50 canoes serving Kirikiriroa. Imports included blankets, clothing, axes, sugar, rum, and tobacco. Millstones were acquired and a water wheel constructed, though possibly the flour mill wasn't completed. However, one article said Kirikiriroa flour was well known.

Magistrate Gorst, estimated that Kirikiriroa had a population of about 78 before the Invasion of Waikato via the Waikato Wars of 1863–64. The government estimated the Waikato area had a Māori population of 3,400 at the same time. After the war in the Waikato, large areas of land (1.2 Million Acres), including the area of the present city of Hamilton were confiscated by the Crown under the New Zealand Settlements Act 1863. Over the next year, most of these villages were abandoned as a result of the land confiscation, also known as Raupatu.

=== Pākehā settlement ===
After the Invasion of the Waikato and confiscation of the invaded land, militia-settlers were recruited in Melbourne and Sydney. On 10 August 1864 the government advertised for tenders to build 10 huts and a hospital at Kirikiriroa. Hamilton was settled by the 4th Waikato Regiment Militia, led by Captain William Steele. The 1st Regiment was at Tauranga, the 2nd at Pirongia, the 3rd at Cambridge and the 4th at Kirikiriroa. The first military settlers arrived on the Rangiriri on 24 August 1864. Members of Ngāti Wairere assembled on the banks of the river as the Rangiriri arrived and threw peaches at her. One of the passengers, Teresa Vowless, passed her baby to another passenger and leapt overboard in order to be the first settler ashore.

Many of the soldier/settlers who intended to farm after the 1863 war, walked off their land in 1868 due to its poor quality. Much of the land was swampy or under water. In 1868 Hamilton's population, which was about 1,000 in 1864, dropped to 300 as farmers left. On 22 December 1875 the first brickworks opened in Hamilton.

=== 19th century development ===
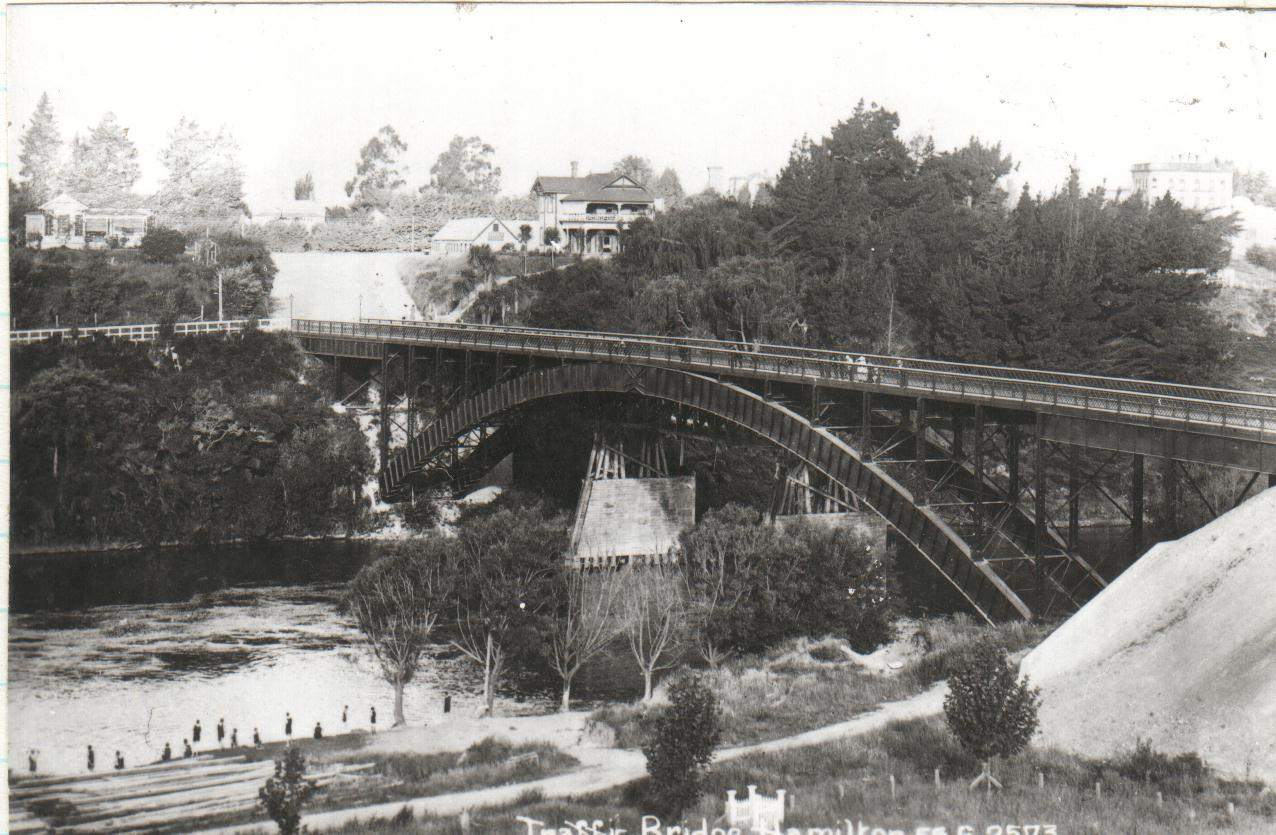
Victoria Bridge in 1910

The road from Auckland reached Hamilton in 1867 and the railway in December 1877. That same month, the towns of Hamilton West and Hamilton East merged under a single borough council. The first traffic bridge between Hamilton West and Hamilton East, known as the Union Bridge, opened in 1879. It was replaced by the Victoria Bridge in 1910.

The first railway bridge, the Claudelands Bridge, was opened in 1884. It was converted to a road traffic bridge in 1965. Hamilton reached 1,000 people in 1900, and the town of Frankton merged with the Hamilton Borough in 1917. Between 1912 and 1936, Hamilton expanded with new land in Claudelands (1912), Maeroa (1925), and Richmond – modern day Waikato Hospital and northern Melville (1936). Hamilton was proclaimed a city in 1945.

In the latter 19th century, the areas of Te Rapa and Pukete were important sites for the kauri gum trade of the late 19th/early 20th centuries, being some of the southern-most locations where gum could be found.

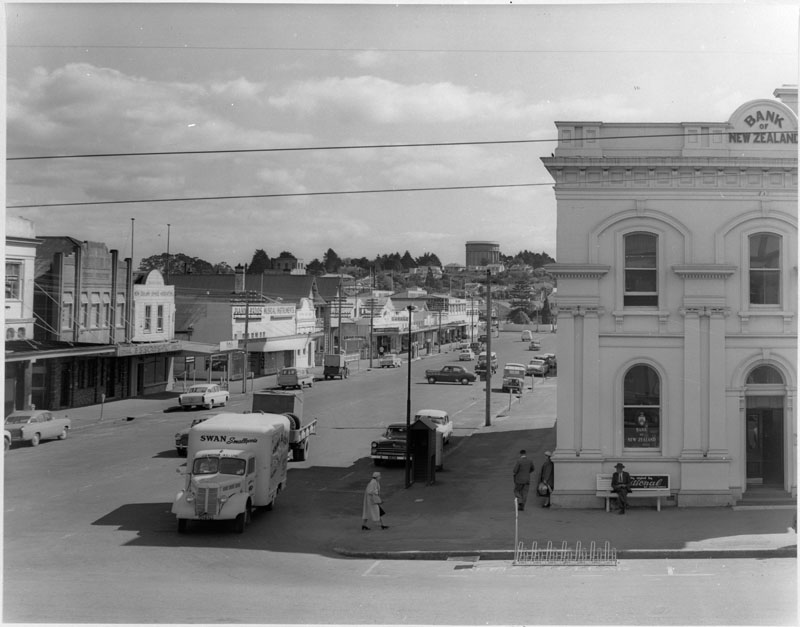
Hood Street in 1962

Beale Cottage is an 1872 listed building in Hamilton East.

=== Contemporary history ===
From 1985 MV Waipa Delta provided excursions along the river through the town centre. In 2009 Waipa Delta was moved to provide trips on Waitematā Harbour in Auckland, but replaced by a smaller boat. That too ceased operation and the pontoon at Parana Park was removed in 2013. The Delta moved to Taupō in 2012. The former Golden Bay vessel, Cynthia Dew, ran 4 days a week on the river from 2012, but was in liquidation in December 2022.

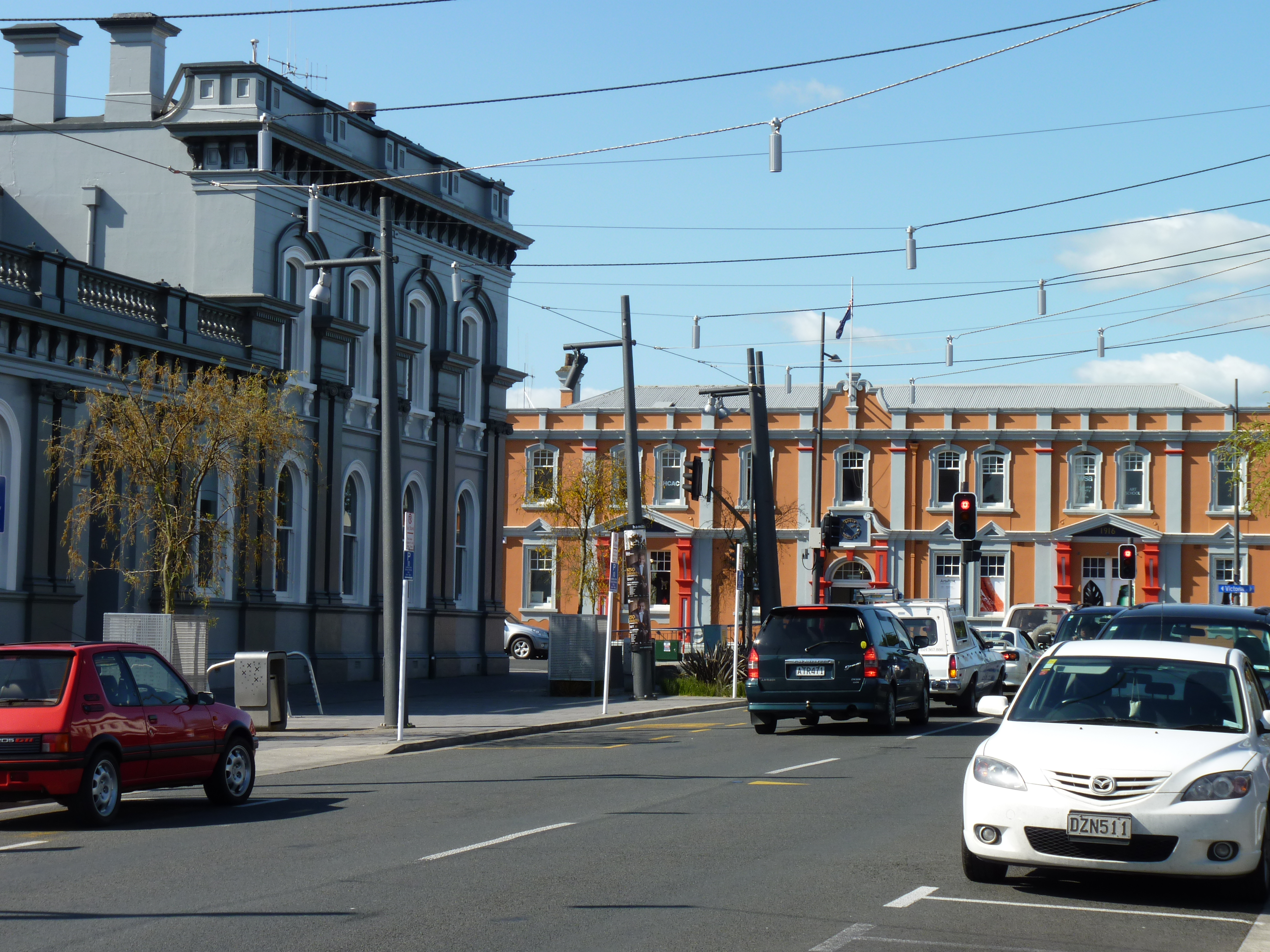
Hood Street in Hamilton Central, with two heritage buildings: former Bank of New Zealand (left) and the former Post Office (right)

As of 2016, the city continues to grow rapidly. Development is focused on the northern end of the city although in 2012 the council made a decision to balance the city's growth by approving an urban development to the south. Traffic congestion is increasing due to population growth, though the council has undertaken many road development projects to try to keep up with the rapid growth. The Hamilton City Council is building a 2/4-lane arterial road, Wairere Drive, through the northern and eastern suburbs to form a 25 km suburban ring road with State Highway 1, which is due for completion in early 2015, while the New Zealand Transport Agency plans to complete the Hamilton section of the Waikato Expressway by 2019, easing congestion taking State Highway 1 out of the city and bypassing it to the east.

The rapid growth of Hamilton has brought with it the side effects of urban sprawl especially to the north east of the city in the Rototuna area. Further development is planned in the Rototuna and Peacocke suburbs. There has been significant development of lifestyle blocks adjacent to the Hamilton Urban Area, in particular Tamahere, and Matangi.

== Geography ==
Waikato River in Hamilton Central from Parana Park

Hamilton's geography is largely the result of successive volcanic ash falls, plus debris, which swept down the Waikato River in at least two massive floods, created by ash blocking the outlet of Lake Taupō. In its present form the landscape originated around 20,000 years ago (20 kya), after the Oruanui eruption of the Taupō Volcano. The dates given for the eruption vary. A 2007 study said it was between 22.5 and 14 kya. Another in 2004 put it 26.5 kya. After the eruption Lake Taupō rose to about 145 m (476 ft) above the present lake. Around 20 kya. the ash dam eroded and the lake rapidly fell some 75 m (246 ft), creating massive floods. The ash they carried formed the main Hinuera Surface into an alluvial fan of volcanic ash, which extends north of Hamilton and drops about 60 m (200 ft) from Karapiro. The Waikato changed its course from flowing into the sea at Thames at about that time, possibly just because sediment built up. The peat lakes and bogs also formed about that time; carbon dating gives maximum ages of 22.5 to 17 kya. Due to an ice age, vegetation was slow to restabilise the ash, so dunes formed up to 25 m (82 ft) above the local Hinuera surface. The current Waikato valley had cut into the debris by about 12 kya. and was further modified by the 181 CE Hatepe eruption, when again Lake Taupō level fell 34 m (112 ft), generating a 20 km^{3} (4.8 cu mi) flood, equivalent to 5 years' normal flow in just a few weeks. About 800 years ago, aggradation began raising the river bed by about 8 m (26 ft).

With the exceptions of the many low hills such as those around the University of Waikato, Hamilton Lake, Beerescourt, Sylvester Road, Pukete, and to the west of the city, and an extensive network of gullies, the terrain of the city is relatively flat. In some areas such as Te Rapa, one old path of an ancient river can be traced. The relatively soft and unconsolidated soil material is still being actively eroded by rain and runoff.

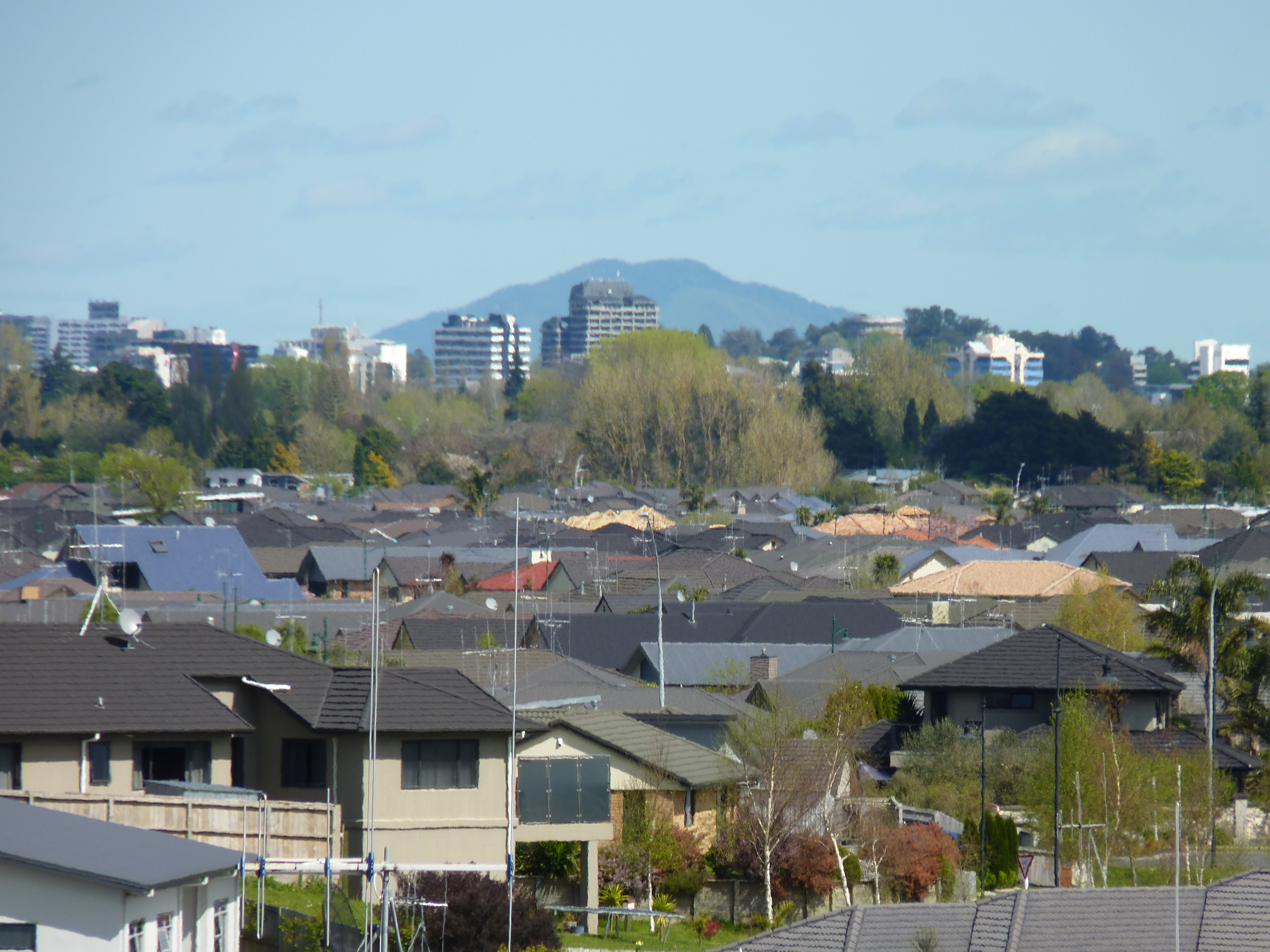
Hamilton Central, from Somerset Heights.

In its natural state, Hamilton and environs was very swampy in winter with 30 small lakes connected to surrounding peatlands. Hamilton was surrounded by 7 large peat bogs such as Komakorau to the North and Rukuhia and Moanatuatua to the South, as well as many smaller ones all of which have now been drained with only small remnants remaining. The total area of peat bog was about 655 km^{2}. Early photos of Hamilton East show carts buried up to their axles in thick mud. Up until the 1880s it was possible to row and drag a dinghy from the city to many outlying farms to the North East. This swampy, damp environment was at the time thought to be an ideal breeding ground for the TB bacillus, which was a major health hazard in the pioneering days. The first Hamilton hospital was constructed on a hill to avoid this problem. One of the reasons why population growth was so slow in Hamilton until the 1920s was the great difficulty in bridging the many arms of the deep swampy gullies that cross the city. Hamilton has 6 major dendritic gully complexes with the 15 km long, 12 branch, Kirikiriroa system being in the north of the city and the southern Mystery creek-Kaipaki gully complex being the largest. Others are Mangakotukutuku, Mangaonua and Waitawhiriwhiri.

In the 1930s, Garden Place Hill, one of the many small hills sometimes referred to as the Hamilton Hills, was removed by unemployed workers working with picks and shovels and model T Ford trucks. The Western remains of the hill are retained by a large concrete wall. The original hill ran from the present Wintec site eastwards to the old post office (now casino). The earth was taken 4 km north to partly fill the Maeroa gully adjacent to the Central Baptist Church on Ulster Street, the main road heading north.

Lake Rotoroa (Hamilton Lake) began forming about 20,000 years ago (20 kya). Originally it was part of an ancient river system that was cut off by deposition material and became two small lakes divided by a narrow peninsula. With higher rainfall and drainage from the extensive peat land to the west, the water level rose so the narrow peninsula was drowned so forming one larger lake. To the north the lake is 8 m deep and in the southern (hospital) end 6 m deep. The old dividing peninsula, the start of which is still visible above water on the eastern side, is only 2 m below the surface. Lake Rotoroa offers a diverse range of recreational activities, including walking trails, picnic areas, and water sports, making it a popular destination for both locals and tourists. The well-maintained paths around the lake are ideal for jogging, walking, and cycling. These trails offer stunning views of the lake and surrounding landscapes, providing a tranquil setting for exercise enthusiasts and nature lovers alike.

=== Suburbs ===
==== Western Hamilton suburbs ====
Beerescourt; Bader; Crawshaw; Deanwell; Dinsdale; Fitzroy; Forest Lake; Frankton; Glenview; Grandview Heights; Hamilton Central; Hamilton North; Hamilton West; Livingstone; Maeroa; Melville; Nawton; Peacocke; Pukete; Rotokauri; St Andrews; Stonebridge; Te Rapa; Temple View; Thornton; Western Heights; Whitiora.

==== Eastern Hamilton suburbs ====
Ashmore; Callum Brae; Chartwell; Chedworth Park; Claudelands; Enderley; Fairfield; Fairview Downs; Flagstaff; Hamilton East; Harrowfield; Hillcrest; Huntington; Magellan Rise; Queenwood; Ruakura; Riverlea; Rototuna; Silverdale; Somerset Heights; St James Park.

=== Climate ===
Hamilton's climate is oceanic (Köppen: Cfb ), with highly moderated temperatures due to New Zealand's location surrounded by ocean. As the largest inland city in the country, winters are cool and mornings can feature the lowest temperatures of the North Island's main centres, dropping as low as −3 °C (27 °F) several times per year, experiencing on average 17.1 nights that drop below freezing. Nighttime temperatures are even cooler outside of the city. Likewise, summers can be some of the warmest in the country with on average 51.6 days with temperatures exceeding 25 °C (77 °F). Ground frosts are common and snow is possible but rare. The only recorded snowfall in modern times was light snowflakes in mid-August 2011 during a prolonged cold period that saw snowfall as far north as Dargaville.

Hamilton receives considerable precipitation amounting to around 1,100 mm over 125 days per year. This coupled with annual sunshine hours of around 2,000 makes Hamilton and the surrounding Waikato an extremely fertile region.

Typically summers are dry and winters are wet. Fog is common during winter mornings, especially close to the Waikato River which runs through the city centre. Hamilton is one of the foggiest cities on earth, however, fog usually burns off by noon to produce sunny and calm winter days.

Hamilton also has the lowest average wind speed of New Zealand's main centres as a result of its inland location, in a depression surrounded by high hills and mountains.

Climate data for Hamilton (1991–2020 normals, extremes 1906–present)
Month	Jan	Feb	Mar	Apr	May	Jun	Jul	Aug	Sep	Oct	Nov	Dec	Year
Record high °C (°F)	32.9 (91.2)	33.3 (91.9)	32.6 (90.7)	29.7 (85.5)	24.3 (75.7)	22.3 (72.1)	20.2 (68.4)	21.8 (71.2)	23.6 (74.5)	26.6 (79.9)	28.4 (83.1)	34.7 (94.5)	34.7 (94.5)
Mean maximum °C (°F)	29.0 (84.2)	29.0 (84.2)	27.7 (81.9)	24.6 (76.3)	21.2 (70.2)	18.5 (65.3)	17.6 (63.7)	18.2 (64.8)	20.4 (68.7)	21.9 (71.4)	25.4 (77.7)	26.9 (80.4)	30.2 (86.4)
Mean daily maximum °C (°F)	24.6 (76.3)	25.1 (77.2)	23.4 (74.1)	20.3 (68.5)	17.2 (63.0)	14.8 (58.6)	14.1 (57.4)	14.9 (58.8)	16.6 (61.9)	18.1 (64.6)	20.1 (68.2)	22.5 (72.5)	19.3 (66.7)
Daily mean °C (°F)	18.7 (65.7)	19.1 (66.4)	17.4 (63.3)	14.7 (58.5)	12.0 (53.6)	9.7 (49.5)	9.0 (48.2)	9.8 (49.6)	11.6 (52.9)	13.1 (55.6)	14.8 (58.6)	17.2 (63.0)	13.9 (57.0)
Mean daily minimum °C (°F)	12.8 (55.0)	13.1 (55.6)	11.4 (52.5)	9.1 (48.4)	6.8 (44.2)	4.7 (40.5)	3.8 (38.8)	4.7 (40.5)	6.5 (43.7)	8.1 (46.6)	9.4 (48.9)	11.9 (53.4)	8.5 (47.3)
Mean minimum °C (°F)	7.1 (44.8)	7.2 (45.0)	5.3 (41.5)	2.6 (36.7)	−1.1 (30.0)	−2.6 (27.3)	−3.4 (25.9)	−1.8 (28.8)	0.4 (32.7)	1.4 (34.5)	3.4 (38.1)	5.9 (42.6)	−3.8 (25.2)
Record low °C (°F)	1.1 (34.0)	0.5 (32.9)	−2.0 (28.4)	−3.9 (25.0)	−5.0 (23.0)	−9.9 (14.2)	−7.5 (18.5)	−5.6 (21.9)	−4.1 (24.6)	−2.9 (26.8)	−0.8 (30.6)	−2.2 (28.0)	−9.9 (14.2)
Average rainfall mm (inches)	75.4 (2.97)	65.0 (2.56)	75.4 (2.97)	92.3 (3.63)	103.3 (4.07)	117.8 (4.64)	124.2 (4.89)	106.5 (4.19)	100.1 (3.94)	86.0 (3.39)	79.0 (3.11)	99.2 (3.91)	1,124.2 (44.27)
Average rainy days (≥ 1.0 mm)	6.6	5.8	6.1	9.5	11.4	12.1	12.7	13.8	12.8	10.6	9.0	9.1	119.5
Average relative humidity (%)	78.3	83.0	86.1	86.9	90.6	91.1	90.9	88.8	82.9	83.4	78.1	78.3	84.9
Mean monthly sunshine hours	237.1	184.4	198.0	163.3	141.5	119.6	127.6	146.9	147.5	171.7	194.4	201.8	2,033.8
Source: NIWA Climate Data

== Demographics ==
Historical population

Year	Pop.
1886	1,201
1901	1,253
1906	2,150
1911	4,655
1916	5,677
1921	11,441
1926	13,980
1931	15,400
1936	16,150
1945	21,982
1951	29,838
1956	35,941
1961	42,212

Year	Pop.
1966	63,000
1971	74,784
1976	87,968
1981	91,109
1986	94,511
1991	101,448
1996	109,043
2001	116,604
2006	129,588
2013	141,612
2018	160,911
2023	174,741

New Zealand census

Hamilton had a population of 174,741 in the 2023 New Zealand census, an increase of 13,830 people (8.6%) since the 2018 census, and an increase of 33,129 people (23.4%) since the 2013 census. There were 85,437 males, 88,497 females and 807 people of other genders in 60,897 dwellings. 3.9% of people identified as LGBTIQ+. The median age was 33.2 years (compared with 38.1 years nationally). There were 36,570 people (20.9%) aged under 15 years, 40,836 (23.4%) aged 15 to 29, 75,549 (43.2%) aged 30 to 64, and 21,783 (12.5%) aged 65 or older.

Of those at least 15 years old, 30,033 (21.7%) people had a bachelor's or higher degree, 66,924 (48.4%) had a post-high school certificate or diploma, and 32,769 (23.7%) people exclusively held high school qualifications. The median income was $42,200, compared with $41,500 nationally. 13,599 people (9.8%) earned over $100,000 compared to 12.1% nationally. The employment status of those at least 15 was that 72,741 (52.6%) people were employed full-time, 16,971 (12.3%) were part-time, and 5,346 (3.9%) were unemployed.

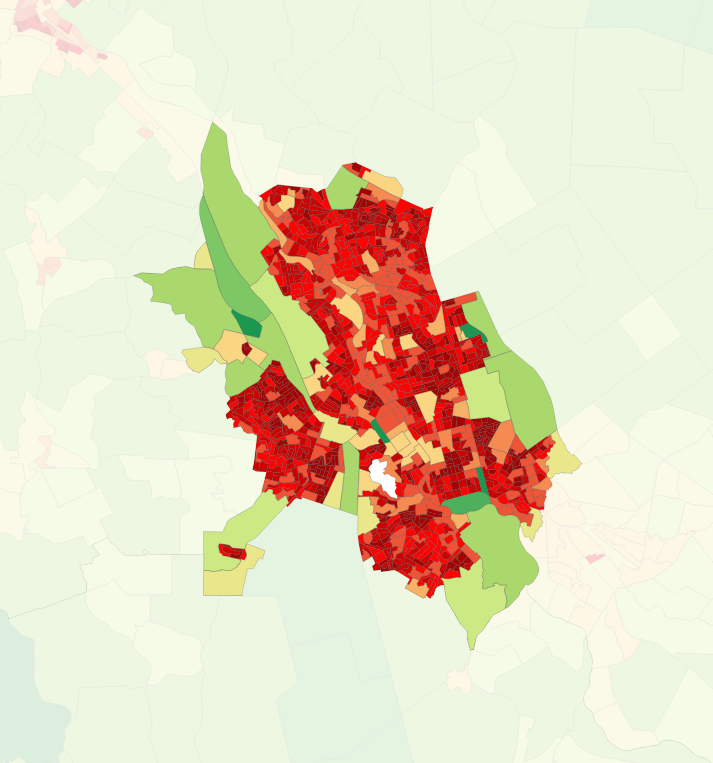
Population density in the 2023 census

Individual wards
Name	Area (km^{2})	Population	Density (per km^{2})	Dwellings	Median age	Median income
West General Ward	64.18	80,817	1,259	29,235	33.1 years	$43,600
East General Ward	46.19	93,921	2,033.4	31,662	33.2 years	$40,900
New Zealand					38.1 years	$41,500

The main area of population growth is in the Flagstaff-Rototuna area. With its large tertiary student population at Wintec and Waikato University, approximately 40,000 tertiary students, Hamilton has a significant transient population. Hamilton is the second fastest growing population centre after Auckland.

=== Culture and identity ===
People could identify as more than one ethnicity. The results were 58.5% European (Pākehā); 25.4% Māori; 6.8% Pasifika; 22.8% Asian; 2.7% Middle Eastern, Latin American and African New Zealanders (MELAA); and 2.0% other, which includes people giving their ethnicity as "New Zealander". English was spoken by 94.0%, Māori language by 6.8%, Samoan by 0.9% and other languages by 20.6%. No language could be spoken by 2.6% (e.g. too young to talk). New Zealand Sign Language was known by 0.6%. The percentage of people born overseas was 30.1%, compared with 28.8% nationally.

Religious affiliations were 32.4% Christian, 4.4% Hindu, 2.7% Islam, 1.5% Māori religious beliefs, 1.3% Buddhist, 0.4% New Age, 0.1% Jewish, and 3.2% other religions. People who answered that they had no religion were 47.8%, and 6.3% of people did not answer the census question.

== Government and politics ==
=== Local government ===
Hamilton is located in the administrative area of the Hamilton City Council. The current mayor of Hamilton is Tim Macindoe, who was first elected to the position in 2025.

Hamilton City is itself part of the Waikato region, controlled administratively by the Waikato Regional Council.

=== Central government ===
Hamilton has three electorate MPs in the New Zealand Parliament. Both Hamilton East and Hamilton West electorates are considered bellwether seats.

The electorates are currently represented by:

General electorates:

- Hamilton East: Ryan Hamilton (National)
- Hamilton West: Tama Potaka (National)

Māori electorate:

- Hauraki-Waikato: Hana-Rawhiti Maipi-Clarke (Maori Party).

== Economy ==
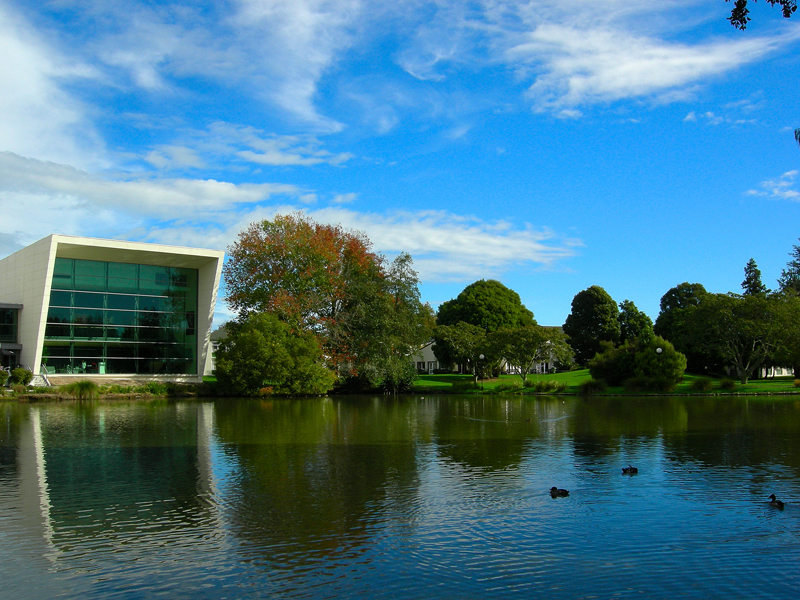
University of Waikato campus

Hamilton has a modelled gross domestic product (GDP) of $8,041 million in the year to March 2024, 4.4% of New Zealand's national GDP. The GDP per capita was $94,871, the third-highest of all territorial authorities (behind Wellington City and the South Taranaki District).

Education and research are important to the city—Hamilton is home to two institutes of higher education, the University of Waikato and the Waikato Institute of Technology (Wintec). Research at the Ruakura research centres have been responsible for much of New Zealand's innovation in agriculture. Hamilton's main revenue source is the dairy industry, due to its location in the centre of New Zealand's largest dairying area.

Hamilton annually hosts the National Agricultural Fieldays at Mystery Creek, the southern hemisphere's biggest agricultural trade exhibition. Mystery Creek is the country's largest event centre and hosts other events of national importance, such as Parachute Christian Music Festival, the National Car Show and the National Boat Show.

Manufacturing and retail are also important to the local economy, as is the provision of health services through the Waikato Hospital. The city is home to New Zealand's largest aircraft manufacturer, Pacific Aerospace, which manufactured its 1,000th aircraft in August 2009, and previously Micro Aviation NZ which manufactured and exported high-quality microlight aircraft. It also has its largest concentration of trailer-boat manufacturers such as Buccaneer. Hamilton is also the home of Gallagher Group Ltd, a manufacturer and exporter of electric fencing and security systems. Employing 600 people Gallagher has been doing business in Hamilton since 1938. Hamilton is also home to Vickers Aircraft Company, a startup aircraft manufacturer making a carbon fibre amphibious aircraft called the Wave.

Recent years have seen the firm establishment of the New Zealand base of the British flight training organisation L3. L3 trains over 350 airline pilots a year at its crew training centre at Hamilton Airport.

Tainui Group Holdings Ltd, the commercial arm of the Waikato tribe, is one of Hamilton's largest property developers. The Waikato tribe is one of the city's largest landowners. Tainui owns land at The Base, Centre Place, The Warehouse Central, University of Waikato, Wintec, the Courthouse, Fairfield College, and the Ruakura AgResearch centre. The Waikato tribe is a major shareholder of the Novotel Tainui and the Hotel Ibis.

It has developed the large retail centre The Base in the old Te Rapa airforce base site which was returned to Tainui, following confiscation in the 1860s, as part of a 1995 Treaty of Waitangi settlement. In mid-2010, The Base was further expanded with Te Awa Mall complex stage 1. Many large retailers such as Farmers and other nationwide speciality chains have located at Te Awa. In 2011 a further stage was opened, with cinemas, restaurants, shops and an underground carpark.

The city's three major covered shopping malls are Centre Place (formerly Downtown Plaza) in the CBD, Chartwell Shopping Centre and most recently Te Awa at The Base. After Farmers Hamilton moves from its existing site on corner of Alexandra and Collingwood streets into the redeveloped Centre Place in late 2013, each major mall will have the department store as an anchor tenant.

The western suburb of Frankton is home to a smaller shopping centre and long-standing local furniture and home department store Forlongs. There are many other small suburban shopping centres or plazas, often centred on a New World or Countdown supermarket, such as in Rototuna, Hillcrest and Glenview.

== Culture ==
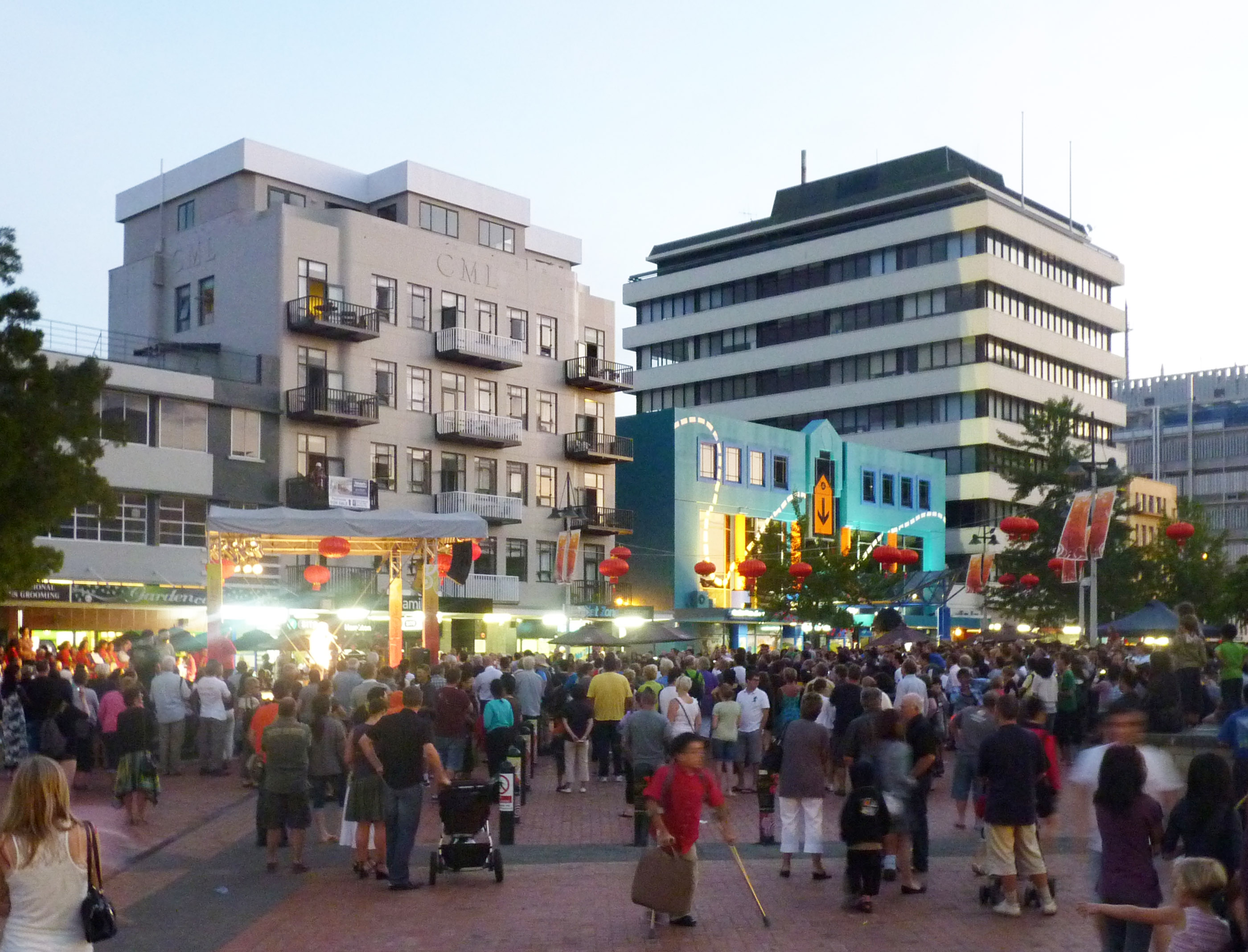
Garden Place

In 2004, Hamilton City Council honoured former resident Richard O'Brien with a life-size bronze statue of him as character Riff Raff, of The Rocky Horror Picture Show, in his space suit. The statue was designed by Wētā Workshop, props makers for The Lord of the Rings films. It stands on the former site of the Embassy Cinema, where O'Brien watched science fiction-double features.

Several Māori Pa have been part restored at Pukete, Hikuwai and Miropiko along the banks of the Waikato River.

The city is host to a large number of small galleries and the Waikato Museum. The latter includes Te Winika, one of the best-preserved waka taua (Māori war canoe) from the pre-colonisation era. It is also home to one of the country's premier experimental black box theatres, The Meteor Theatre.

=== Music ===
Hamilton is host to several large scale music festivals including the Soundscape music festival, which is one of New Zealand's largest street parties. The city also hosts the Opus Chamber Orchestra which draws musicians from around the Waikato Region and is the home of the New Zealand Chamber Soloists. An ongoing classical concert series featuring world class musicians is held throughout the year at the Gallagher Concert Chamber, organised by the University of Waikato, Conservatorium of Music.

=== Events ===
- January: Parachute music festival (discontinued after 2014), Festival One (from 2015)
- February: Hamilton Gardens Arts Festival, Couch Soup Festival of One-Act Plays
- March: Waikato Food & Wine Festival
- March: Soundscape
- March: Indigo Festival
- April: The Great Pumpkin Carnival at Hamilton Gardens
- April: Armageddon Expo Sci Fi & Comics Convention*
- April: Balloons over Waikato hot air ballooning festival
- April: 5 Bridges River Swim
- May: Hamilton Circle Jerk music event
- June: National Agricultural Fieldays
- June: Hamilton Fuel Festival
- July: Soundscape

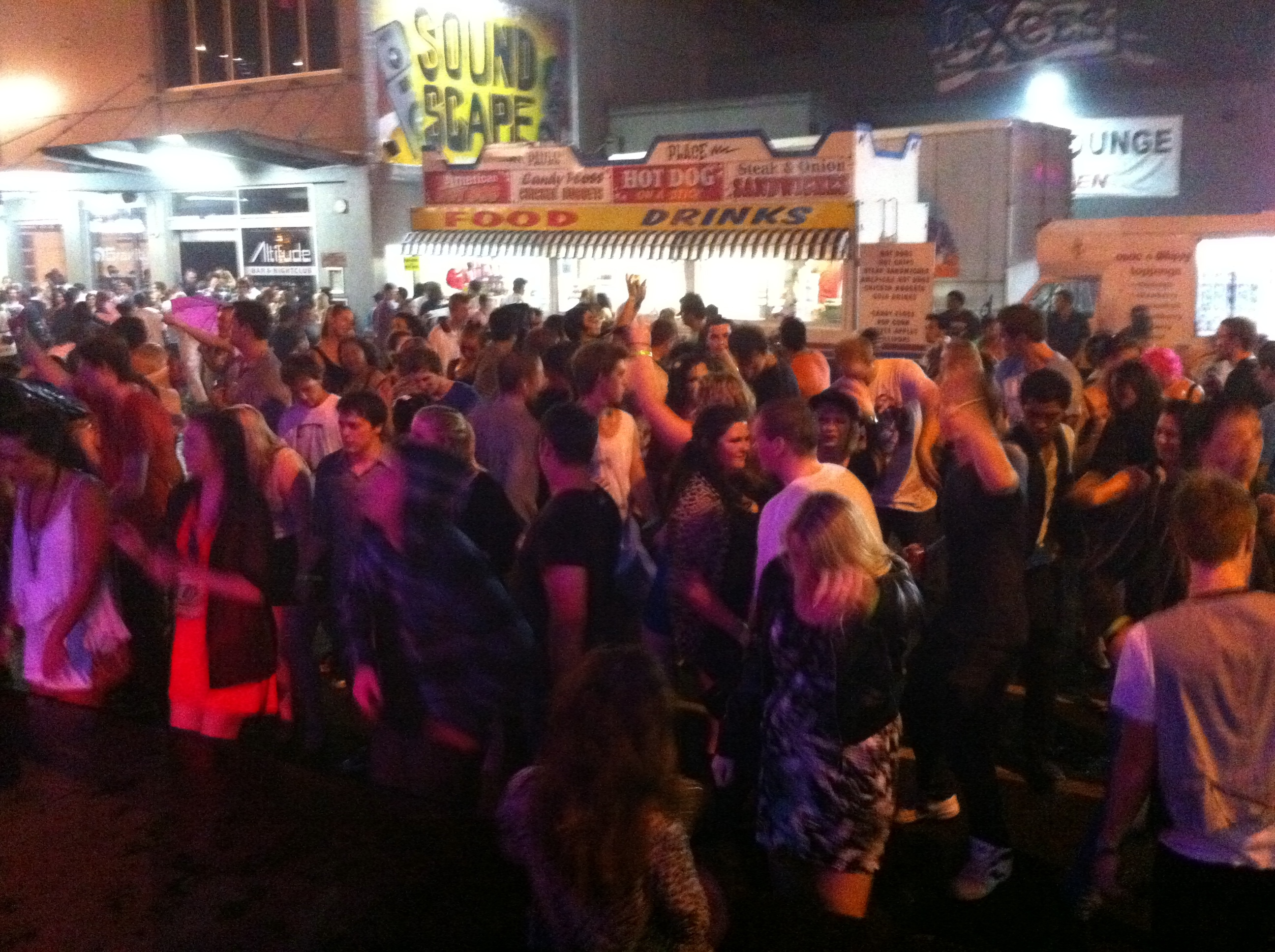
Tronik DJs play at the sellout Soundscape street party

- August: World Rally Championship
- August: International Festival of Media, Arts and Design
- August: International Film Festival
- September: Hamilton Pride Festival
- September: The Great Race
- September: Hamilton Underground Film Festival
- October: Hamilton Fringe Festival
- November: Bridge to Bridge water skiing event
- November: Round the Bridges running event

=== Sport ===
The local rugby union teams are Waikato (Mitre 10 Cup) and the Chiefs (Super Rugby). The local colours are red, yellow and black, and the provincial mascot is Mooloo, an anthropomorphic cow. Both teams play at Waikato Stadium. Hamilton is also home to a football club, WaiBOP United, that competes in the ASB Premiership during summer. The winter football clubs Hamilton Wanderers and Melville United competing in the Lotto Sport Italia NRFL Premier League are also based in Hamilton.

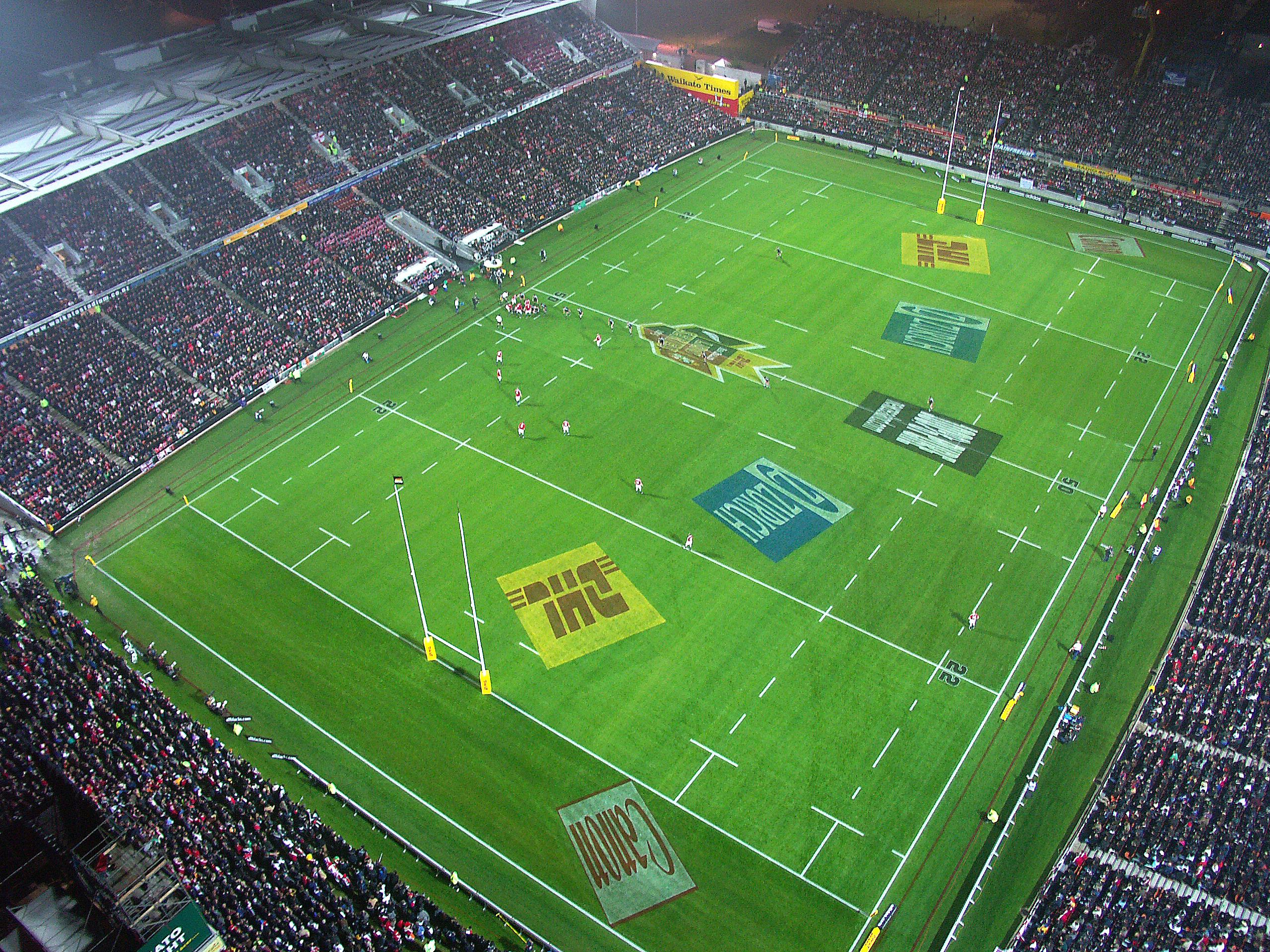
Waikato Stadium, Lions vs. NZ Māori, 2005.

Seddon Park (formerly Westpac Park) is Hamilton's main cricket venue and hosts Test matches, One Day Internationals and T20 Internationals. It is the home ground of the Northern Districts Cricket Association.

Hamilton is fast becoming a motorsport venue as well. A round of the WRC was held in 2006 and the annual V8 Supercars race on a street circuit started in 2008 and ended in 2012.

Rugby league is also played in Hamilton with the two local teams, Hamilton City Tigers and Hamilton Hornets/College Old Boys, playing in the Premier Division of the Waikato Rugby League.

Sailing takes place on Hamilton lake for 9 months of the year. The Hamilton Yacht Club has its clubrooms, slipway and ramp on the western side of Lake Rotoroa. Motor boats are not allowed on the lake, with an exception of the Yacht Club rescue boats.

Each year in April, Hamilton supports the '5 Bridges' swimming challenge. The course starts in Hamilton Gardens, and continues for 6 kilometres finishing at Ann St Beach. The swim is assisted by the current, with the full distance typically covered in under an hour. The event celebrated its 71st year on 11 April 2010.

== Media ==
The major daily newspaper is the Waikato Times. Weekly community newspapers include the Hamilton Press, Hamilton News and Waikato University student magazine Nexus.

Local radio stations include The Breeze, Free FM, More FM, Contact FM. The Edge and The Rock, two of New Zealand's most popular radio stations, were originally based in Hamilton.

== City facilities and attractions ==
Hamilton Gardens is the region's most popular tourist attraction and hosts the Hamilton Gardens Summer Festival each year. The Base is New Zealand's third largest shopping centre, with over 7.5 million visitors per year to the 190 stores. Te Awa, an enclosed speciality retail mall at The Base, was awarded a silver medal by the International Council of Shopping Centres for the second-best expansion in the Asia Pacific region.

Other local attractions include Hamilton Zoo, Waikato Museum, the Hamilton Astronomical Society Observatory, the Arts Post art gallery, and the SkyCity casino. Just 20 minutes' drive away is Ngāruawāhia, the location of Turangawaewae Marae and the official residence of Māori queen Nga wai hono i te po.

Hamilton has six public libraries located throughout the city, with the Central Library housing the main reference and heritage collection. Hamilton City Theaters provides professional venue and event management at two of the three theatrical venues in the city: Waikato Regional Theatre, opened in 2026(Known as BNZ Theatre for sponsorship reasons), and Clarence St Theater. The Meteor Theatre was bought by the One Victoria Trust in 2013 after the Hamilton City Council proposed selling it, and it is now privately operated.

St Peter's Cathedral, built in 1916, is the Anglican cathedral in Hamilton, on Cathedral Hill at the southern end of Victoria Street. There is also St Mary's Roman Catholic cathedral on the opposite side of the river.

The Hamilton New Zealand Temple of the Church of Jesus Christ of Latter-day Saints is located in Temple View, Hamilton. It was opened along with the Church College of New Zealand, a large high school owned by the church, in the late 1950s. Both the college and the temple were built by labour missionaries. The school was closed in December 2009. Every year, the temple hosts a large Christmas lighting show that attracts crowds from all over the country.

== Hospitals ==
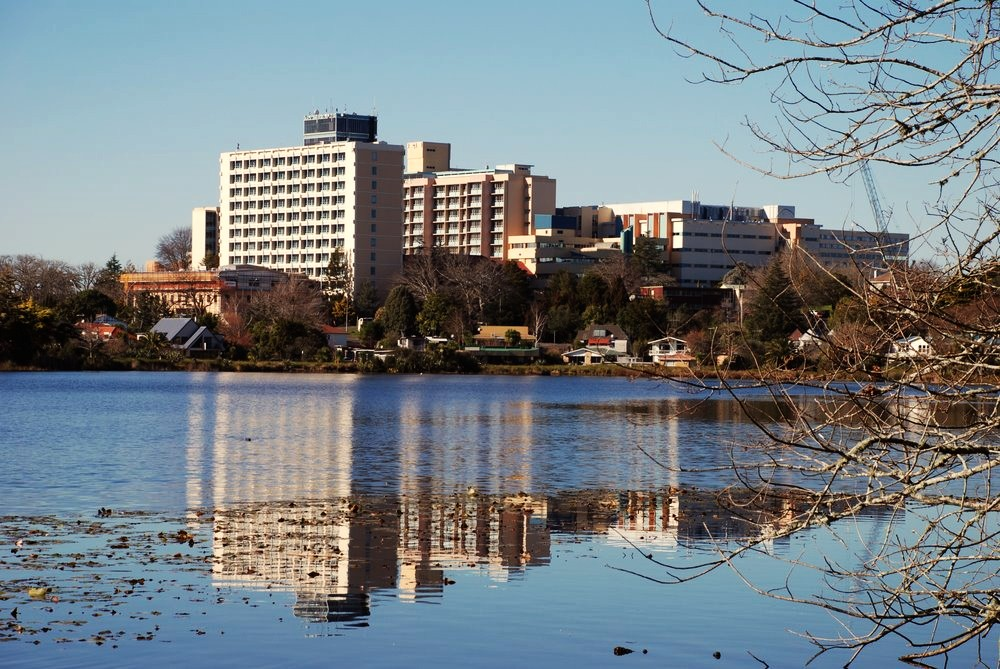
Waikato Hospital in Hamilton West

Hamilton's public hospital is Waikato Hospital with 722 beds and 22 operating theatres. About 5,000 people worked there in 2014. It is the fourth largest public hospital in New Zealand in number of beds. There are two other major private hospitals in Hamilton City; Braemar Hospital, located in the same area that Waikato Hospital is located, and Southern Cross Hospital, located in Hamilton East. Hamilton also has a two private primary maternity hospitals, which are fully funded by the Waikato District Health Board, Waterford Birth Centre and River Ridge East Birth Centre.

== Transport ==
The New Zealand Household Travel Survey 2015 – 2018 said that 86% of Hamilton trip legs were made by car (60% as driver, 26% as passenger), 10% were walking, 2% cycling and 1% by bus.

=== Air ===
Hamilton Airport serves both domestic and international flights. It is jointly owned by Hamilton City and neighbouring district councils. The airport is located just outside Hamilton's boundary, within the Waipa District. There are direct flights with Air New Zealand to Christchurch and Wellington and Origin Air to Napier, Nelson and Palmerston North. Sunair served Hamilton for 30 years before withdrawing due to insufficient demand. The airport also served as a major base for now-defunct low-cost airlines Freedom Air and Kiwi Air. International flights were discontinued in 2012, primarily due to a small market. In June 2025 international flights returned, with services to Sydney and Gold Coast operated by Jetstar, with them also operating daily flights to Christchurch .

The airport is the base for pilot training schools and the aircraft manufacturer, Pacific Aerospace, is located at the northern end of the runway.

=== Cycling ===
Hamilton has 97 km (60 mi) of on-road, 21 km (13 mi) of off-road and 28 km (17 mi) of riverside cycleways, which link the city centre with the outlying suburbs. These cycleways consist of a mixture of dedicated cycle lanes, which are 1-metre-wide strips either coloured green or with a painted outline of a cycle and mixed use cycle/walk ways which are mainly located alongside the Waikato River. The city's design guide says the preferred width for cycleways is 3 m (9.8 ft). A cycleway was built beside Greenwood Street and Kahikatea Drive in 2015 and beside Ohaupo Road and Normandy Avenue in 2016. A $6.7m, 2.7 km (1.7 mi) Western Rail Trail opened in 2017 linking Glenview, Melville, and Deanwell, Hamilton Girls' High School, WINTEC and the city centre.

=== Road ===
One of New Zealand's main road artery State Highway 1C runs through several of Hamilton's suburbs and connects with State Highway 3 at a major intersection within the city boundaries. The Hamilton section of the Waikato Expressway, which was completed in 2022 shifted State Highway 1 to the east of Hamilton City, effectively bypassing the city and easing congestion between commuting city traffic and through traffic. It will also, as expressed in a City Council report, "undermine the attractiveness of public transport as a mode of choice for many years to come."

Safer Speed Areas 40 km/h limits were first introduced in Hamilton in 2011 and by 2014 there were 36 of them, many in suburbs near the river.

From 1864 Hamilton was on the Great South Road, created to connect Auckland to Te Awamutu and facilitate the invasion of the Waikato.

==== Ring Road ====
As well as being bypassed by the Expressway, Hamilton will also have the Ring Road and, prior to those, the city centre was bypassed by Anglesea Street in 1964 and the main road diverted from the north end of Victoria Street onto Ulster Street, which was extended to absorb Gurnell Avenue and form a 4-lane main road, by putting Waitewhiriwhiri Stream in a culvert and filling the valley.

The Hamilton Ring Road project was initiated to free some of the city's streets from peak-traffic congestion and improve connectivity around the city. It consists of five segments, opening between 1963 and 2024. It was linked to the Te Rapa Section of the Waikato Expressway in 2012.

===== Cobham Drive =====
The first part of the ring road, Cobham Drive, from Tristram St to Cambridge Road, was named in 1963 after the Governor-General, Viscount Cobham. It was originally named Southern Outlet. It linked to SH3 along Normandy Drive. Prior to that the junction with SH3 had been at Victoria Street / Bridge Street and SH1 had used Grey Street and Cambridge Road.

===== Greenwood Street and Kahikatea Drive =====
To the west and south, Greenwood Street, which had existed since 1907, was extended south to Kahikatea Drive, which was named in 1971 and opened about 1974.

===== Avalon Drive =====
The next part of the ring road, on the western side, opened when SH1 was diverted from the city centre to run east of the city, through Nawton from 1 July 1992. Norton Road Extension was renamed Avalon Drive. The road was originally built about 1919. Currently this road is quite congested in morning and evening peak-hour however space has been allocated to upgrade the road from its current two lanes to four lanes in the near future.

===== Wairere Drive =====
Wairere Drive forms the north east part of the ring road. Initially it ran from Avalon Drive to River Road at Flagstaff, via Pukete Bridge. The land for it was gazetted in 1995 and the road was on the 1998 map. It had a 70 km/h speed limit. The extension to Hukanui Rd was on the 2009 map. It was then extended from Hukanui Rd to Crosby Rd in 2010, to Ruakura Rd in 2013 and 5.5 km (3.4 mi) to Cambridge Rd in 2014, when the Pukete Rd to Resolution Dr section was widened from 2 to 4 lanes, and roundabouts replaced with traffic lights, at a cost of $84m. The extension from Hukanui Road to Tramway Road cost $1.5m in 2005/06, plus $3.3m in 2007/08. In 2008, on the budget had been over $14m. The road includes a 3 m (9.8 ft) wide cycleway. Completion is planned for 2022.

Traffic at Pukete Bridge in 2006 was 25,200 vehicles a day. In 2018 it was 38,400. Many sections of Wairere Drive are congested during morning and evening peak-hour traffic. Hamilton City Council removed funding from its 2024-2034 Long Term Plan to widen many sections of the road, which included the construction of new bus priority and transit lanes.

In 2017, it was noted that a drop in passenger numbers on the Orbiter bus correlated with opening of the extension to Cambridge Rd in 2014.

===== Southern Links =====
The final part of the ring road will be the Southern Links, through Peacocke. Construction of the $150m bridge over the Waikato is planned between 2020 and 2023. The plan for the area says, "it is intended that the arterial routes also make provision for alternative modes of transport such as light rail by maintaining corridors." The sixth National government has promised to build the Southern Links as part of the Roads of National Significance project.

==== Bridges ====
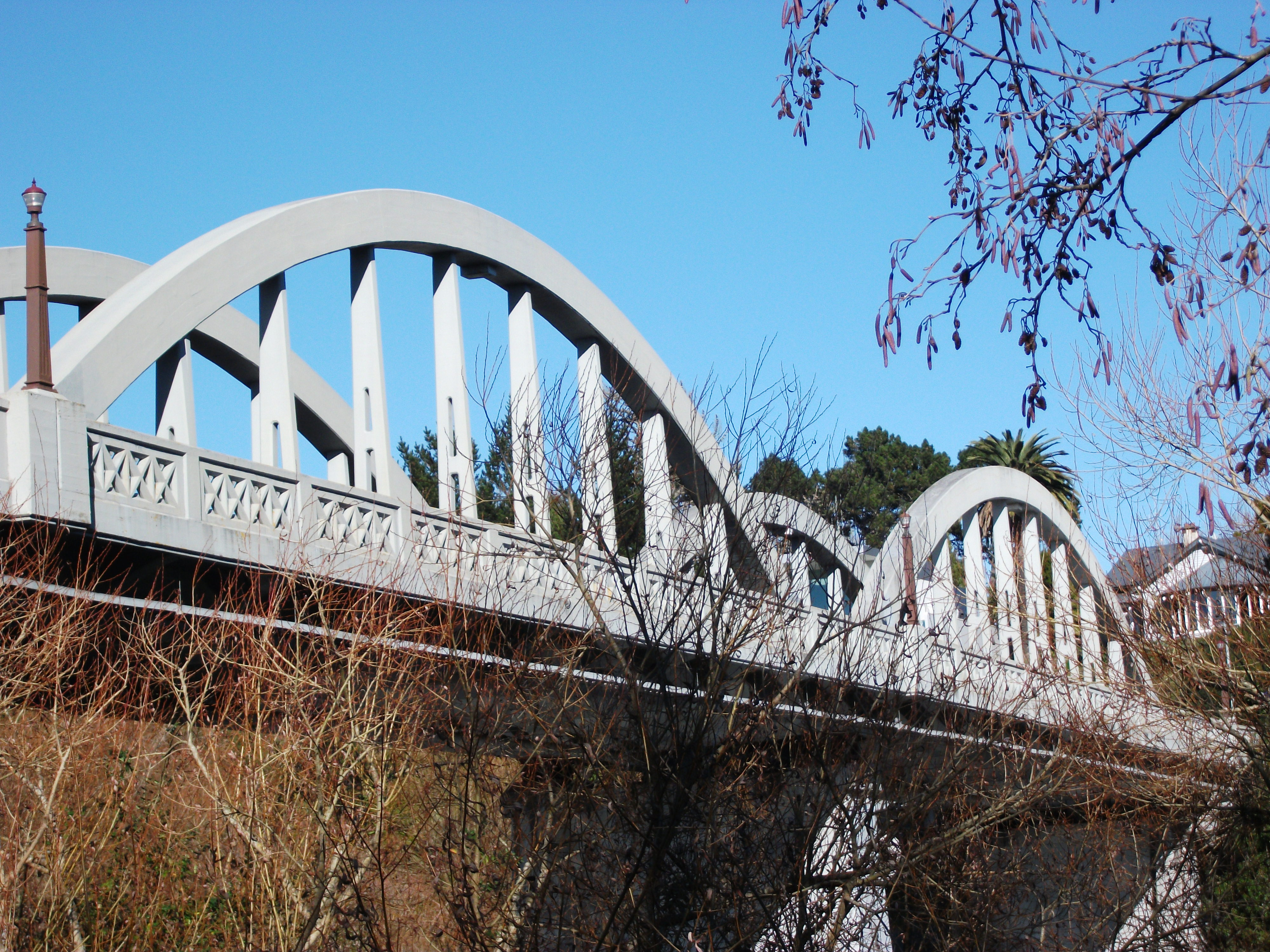
Fairfield Bridge, in central Hamilton.

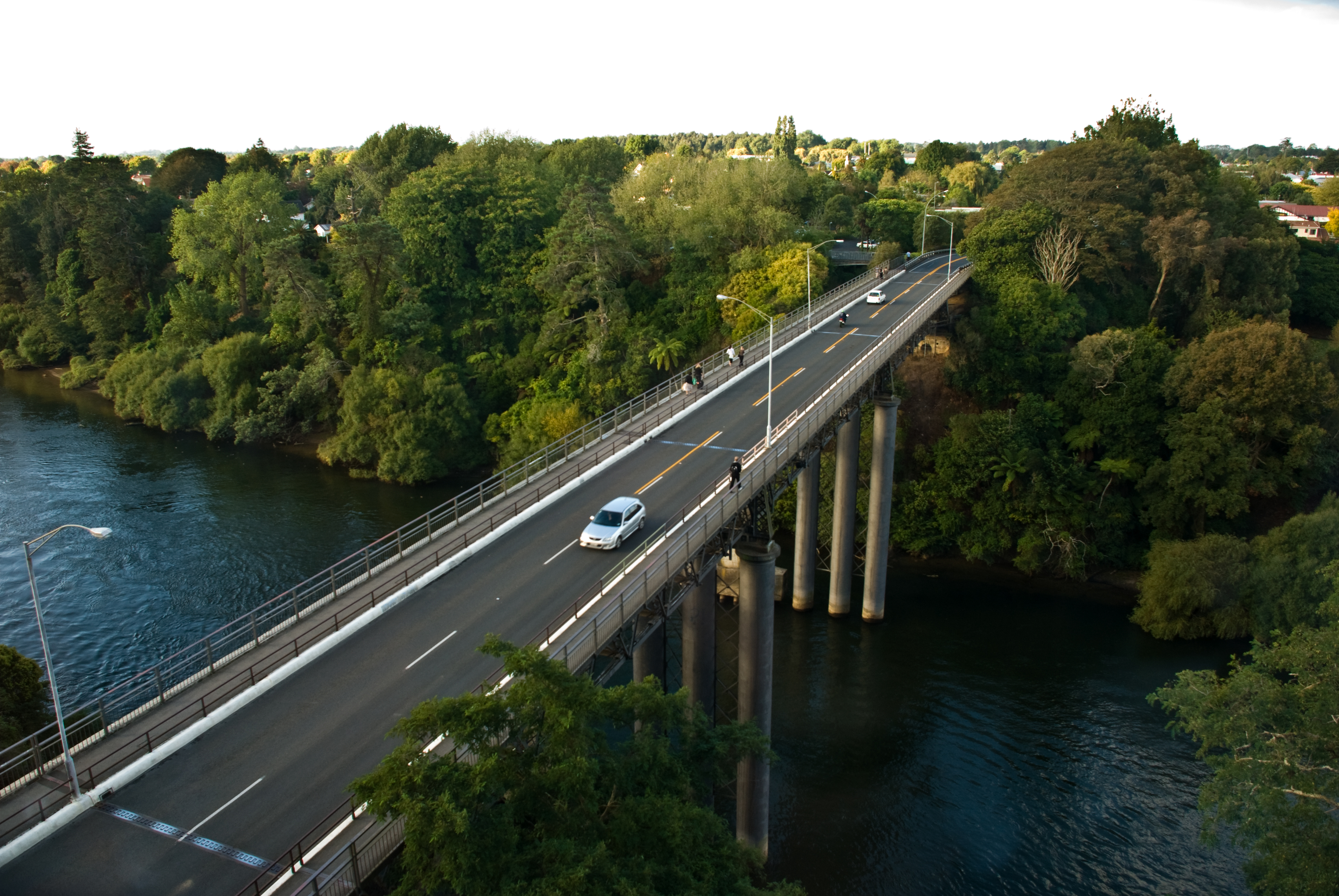
Claudelands Bridge, Waikato

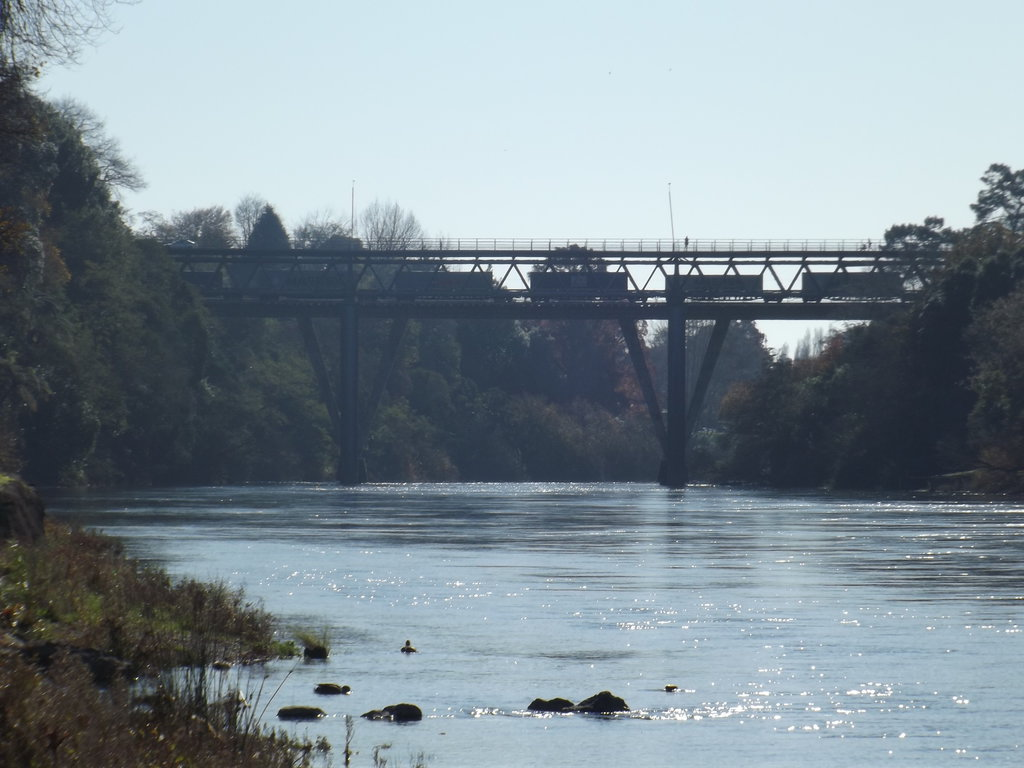
Claudelands Bridge, Hamilton, NZ. Taken from just below the Bridge Street bridge.

The seven road bridges that cross the river are often the focus of morning and evening traffic delays. The road bridges within the city are (from north to south):

- Pukete Bridge
- Fairfield Bridge
- Whitiora Bridge
- Claudelands Bridge
- Victoria Bridge
- Cobham Bridge
- Te Ara Pekapeka Bridge

In addition to the road bridges within the city, the Horotiu bridge is located approximately 10 km north of the city centre and the Narrows Bridge approximately 10 km to the south. The Narrows bridge was closed for reconstruction of its piles in September 2010. In Jan 2011 widening of the 1 km approach road Wairere Drive to Pukete bridge began. The bridge was expanded to 4 lanes in early 2013.

The river is also crossed by a rail bridge and a pedestrian bridge:

- Claudelands Rail Bridge
- Pukete – Flagstaff Pedestrian / Sewer Bridge (see Sewage section below)

Funding for a walking and cycling bridge over the Waikato River that would connect Memorial Park to the CBD was re-allocated in Hamilton City Council's 2024-2034 Long Term Plan.

==== Buses ====
Hamilton has buses linking the CBD to most of its suburbs. It also has three high-frequency bus services named Orbiter, Comet and the Meteor. The Orbiter service loops Hamilton City in both clockwise and anti-clockwise directions connecting Rotokauri Transport Hub, Rototuna, Chartwell, University, CBD South, Hospital, Dinsdale and Wintec Rotokauri Campus. The Comet service runs north to south and vice-versa connecting the southern suburbs to the Hospital, CBD, Transport Centre, Te Rapa and The Base shopping centre. The Meteor service runs east to west and vice-versa connecting the south-eastern suburbs to the University, Hamilton East, CBD, Transport Centre, western suburbs, Wintec Rotokauri and the Rotokauri Transport Hub. The high frequency buses run every 15 minutes during peak times.

=== Rail ===
==== Stations ====
Hamilton City has two railway stations, both servicing the Auckland to Waikato train service, Te Huia. The Rotokauri station (also known as the Rotokauri Transport Hub) is located in Rotokauri behind The Base shopping centre in Hamilton North. The main Hamilton station is located in Frankton at the junction of the East Coast Main Trunk line (ECMT) and the North Island Main Trunk line (NIMT). A disused platform on the ECMT lies beneath the CBD.

In 2006, a study was done into a possible re-introduction of daily commuter train services to Auckland and the benefits that might flow from it. The new service, dubbed Te Huia, commenced on 6 April 2021.

==== Freight ====
Hamilton's rail network serves as a major hub for the distribution of dairy products to the ports of Auckland and Tauranga. This hub is located on Crawford St, on land that was formerly part of the Te Rapa Marshalling Yard, just north of the locomotive depot. Te Rapa is at the northern end of the 25 kV AC 50 Hz electrification between Hamilton and Palmerston North.

==== Preserved stock ====
Hamilton also has two locomotives on display:

- NZR F class 230 was donated by Ellis & Burnand, the central North Island sawmillers, in 1956 for static display. Formerly used as the yard engine at their Mangapehi sawmill, it was placed on display at Lake Rotoroa and its boiler filled with concrete. This engine has become a 0-4-2ST in later years following the loss of her rear coupling rod.
- NZR D^{SA} 230 (TMS DSA359), a 0-6-0DM diesel shunting locomotive built by English Electric for the Drewry Car Company, was withdrawn in 1986 and placed on display at Frankton minus its Gardner 8L3 diesel engine and transmission. It was moved in the early 2000s with its shelter to Minogue Park, where it was united with an open seating wagon built on the underframe of wagon W 960, built in 1946 and converted to Way & Works wagon E 7784 in April 1966.

==== The railway settlement ====
From the arrival of the railway in Hamilton, Frankton was a railway town. In 1923, the suburb became even more railway-orientated when the Frankton Junction Railway House Factory opened, producing the famous George Troup designed railway houses sent to many North Island railway settlements, which are now sought-after pieces of real estate. Its 60 workers produced almost 1400 pre-fabricated railway houses at a peak rate of 400 a year, using rimu and mataī from the railway's central North Island forests. When, in 1926, government cuts reduced the need for railway houses, the factory also started to supply houses for local councils. Those supplied to Lower Hutt were claimed to be £500 cheaper than comparable houses. The sawmill also produced everything else such as signal masts and boxes, bridges, sleepers, and even furniture for railway stations. It was too efficient for private builders, who got the housing factory closed in 1929. When it finally closed in the 1990s it was very dilapidated, but NZHPT supported restoration of the Category 1 historic place, retaining original windows, big sliding doors and the saw-tooth roof. It is now home to a range of businesses.

Frankton also was home to the Way and Works depot, still in operation as the KiwiRail Network depot. This was connected to the main line by a short siding that ran past the factory; this line was last used in 1997 when a shunting locomotive retrieved two flat wagons from the Way and Works depot.

The railway workers' community was centred largely around the W&W depot and sawmill, containing some 200 houses and a Railways Social Hall. Many of the houses are still in place, the majority being the classic 90sq^{2} three-bedroom design used as standard across New Zealand for railway staff.

== Education ==
Hamilton is home to more than 40,000 tertiary students, mostly enrolled in one of the city's three main tertiary institutes; the University of Waikato, Waikato Institute of Technology and Te Wananga o Aotearoa. The city is also home to 53 schools both private and state-owned.

As well as state and private primary, intermediate and high schools, it also notably includes a number of Kura Kaupapa Māori primary schools offering education in the Māori language.

The city has seven state secondary schools, in a clockwise direction from north: Rototuna High School in Rototuna, Fairfield College in Fairfield, Hamilton Boys' High School in Hamilton East, Hillcrest High School in Silverdale, Melville High School in Melville, Hamilton Girls' High School in the central city, and Fraser High School in Nawton. Both Boys' and Girls' High offer boarding facilities. A new state secondary school is opened for the Rototuna area to serve the booming north-eastern corner of the city. The project had been delayed several years as the previous secondary school serving the area, Fairfield College, was below capacity. The new secondary school opened in 2016.

Additionally, Hamilton is home to a number of state-integrated and private schools. There are numerous state-integrated Catholic primary schools throughout the city. Sacred Heart Girls College and St John's College are the integrated Catholic high schools, for girls and boys respectively. Southwell School is a private co-educational Anglican primary school. Waikato Diocesan School for Girls is an integrated Anglican high school.' St Paul's Collegiate School is a private high school for boys, also accepting girls from Year 11. All three Anglican schools are boarding and day schools. Hamilton Christian School is a private coeducational nondenominational Christian school for Years 1–13, founded in 1982.

== Utilities ==
Although telegraph came to Hamilton with the 1864 invasion which established the town, it was quite late in developing its gas (1895), water (1903), sewage (1907) and electricity supplies (1913), probably because its population remained low; in 1911 Hamilton's population was 3,542 and Frankton's 1,113. Optical cables and microwave towers now provide telecommunications links, gas is supplied by pipeline from Taranaki, water from the Waikato River by the Water Treatment Station at Waiora Terrace, sewage flows for treatment at Pukete and electricity is supplied from the national grid. Restrictions are still placed on garden sprinklers in summer and the Pukete sewage works was still not always meeting discharge Resource consent conditions in 2013.

=== Telephone ===
A telegraph line from Auckland came shortly after the invasion, reaching Whatawhata, Te Awamutu and Cambridge by October 1864. Telephones came to Hamilton from 1882. Hamilton got a telephone exchange in 1904 with 39 subscribers. Hamilton telephones were put on an automatic exchange between 1915 and 1920. In 1955 a 4-tube coaxial system linked Auckland and Hamilton, able to take 960 simultaneous calls. In 1956 Cabinet approved a microwave radio link from Palmerston North to Hamilton via hilltop repeaters at Te Awamutu, Te Kūiti. Awakino, Tuahu (south of Urenui), Cardiff, Kakaramea, Pākaraka and Marton, able to take 600 simultaneous calls. A broadband link from Rotorua to Hamilton opened in 1965. Waikato University opened the country's first Internet connection in 1989.

=== Gas ===
Auckland Gas Company had been set up in 1862, but it wasn't until the Hamilton Gasworks Act 1895 that Henry Atkinson (son of the manager of Auckland gasworks) was allowed to set up a gasworks in Clarence St on allotment 322 (see photo of the) and put gas pipes under the streets. Work started on laying about 50 tons of pipes in July 1895.

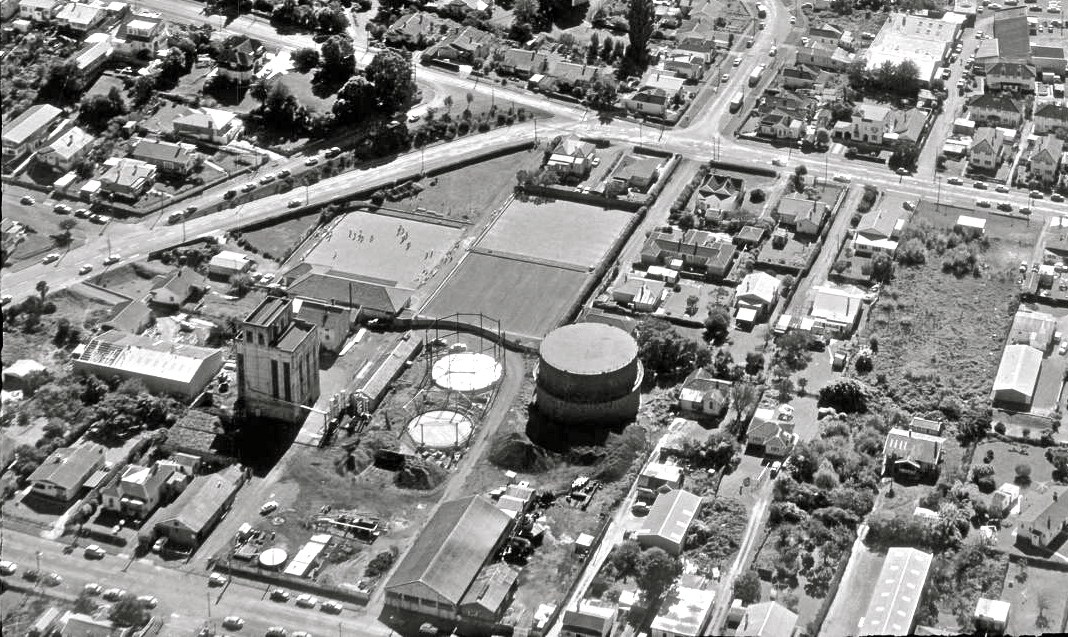
Clarence St gasworks in 1967 with Pembroke Rd, Pembroke La, Thackeray St, Tristram St in background – Hamilton, including city buildings.

It also allowed the city to purchase after 12 years at a price determined by arbitration. A 1907 referendum authorised the city council to take over the gasworks. In 1911 the Privy Council set the purchase price at £34,402/14/3d ($5.7m at 2017 prices), half of which was for goodwill.

A 100,000 cubic feet (2,800 m^{3}) gasholder was authorised in 1911. In 1913 the works was expanded and mains laid over the railway bridge into Hamilton East and along Ohaupo Rd.

As well as gas, coke, tar and tar paint were produced. Additions were made to the works as late as 1961. Waikato coal was mixed with coal shipped via Greymouth and Raglan from 1964 until 25 March 1970, when Hamilton switched to natural gas and the gasworks closed. The site was cleaned up after demolition in the 1990s, but is still monitored by Regional Council for contamination.

Hamilton was one of the original nine towns and cities in the North Island to be supplied with natural gas when the Kapuni gas field enters production in 1970. Gas from the Kapuni field in south Taranaki was transported north via a 373 km long, 200 mm diameter pipeline to Papakura in south Auckland, with Hamilton supplied via an offtake at Temple View.

=== Water ===
By 1890 complaints were being made of a shortage of water in the wells and tanks. In 1902, a poll of ratepayers approved borrowing £5,000 to set up a water supply. In 1903 3.2 km (2 mi) of pipes supplied water to 80 properties in Victoria, Anglesea, Collingwood, Clarence and Selkirk streets and the borough turncock reported average use at 15 imperial gallons (68 L) a day (average consumption is now 224 litres (49 imp gal) a day). By 1908 nearly all of Hamilton West had piped water, extended to Frankton and Claudelands in 1912. A contract to pump the water into a tower was let in 1912. By 1916 a 75-foot-high (23 m) water tower on Lake Rd had been built to give extra pressure, mainly for the Fire Brigade whose station opened in 1917. Use was reported as 6,942,000 imperial gallons (31,558,957 L) in the month of August 1918. In 1931 the system was upgraded, with larger pipes and an 86 ft (26 m) tower on Ruakiwi Rd, holding 2,600,000 imp gal (11,819,834 L). Until 1939 on Sundays visitors could climb the tower for 6d. The old tower remained until 1966. A treatment works was built in 1923, using candy filters and supplying water at 75psi.

The 1930 Hillsborough Terrace Water Treatment Station had a maximum continuous capacity slightly over 30 megalitres per day (ML/d). By 1970 peak demands exceeded 45 ML/d with the average annual daily demand being around 25 ML/d, but the site was too small to expand. So Waiora Terrace Station, Glenview (opposite Hamilton Gardens), was commissioned in mid 1971. It was designed for a maximum capacity of 65 ML/d, expandable to 190 ML/d, was increased to approximately 85ML/d with the addition of polymer dosing in the 1980s and by 2010 had a capacity of 106 ML/d. It was built to a Patterson Candy design with coagulation, rapid sand gravity filtration and chlorine gas disinfection.

Chlorine is added at 0.3 ppm and fluoride has been added since 1966, though with a brief withdrawal in 2013/14 and referendums supporting it in 2006 and 2013. The river water has 0.2 to 0.4 ppm fluoride which is increased to around 0.75ppm through the station. Arsenic in the Waikato River is also monitored. It can be about 3 times above the WHO limit, but treatment effects a 5-fold reduction to a level which meets the standards.

From river level the water is pumped up to 8 reservoirs, which uses 410 kWh of power for each million litres of water pumped. To cope with river levels below the intake pipes, a floating pumping platform was installed in 2016. It can pump up to 70 million litres a day. Average use in 2010 was 224 litres per day per person. The 2006 population was 129,249, so total annual consumption was a bit over 10,000 million litres, using over 4 million kWh. A Hamilton City map shows the location of water, stormwater and sewage infrastructure and a description of the water distribution system is in this 2001 HCC Strategic Planning document.

==== Reservoirs ====
A 24 million litre reservoir opened at Kay Road in north Rototuna in 2017, providing Hamilton's ninth reservoir, the others being at Dinsdale (2), Fairfield, Hillcrest, Maeroa, Pukete and, as above, at Ruakiwi. A 12 million litre reservoir will be added at Ruakura in 2020.

=== Sewage ===
Sewage long lagged behind other utilities. Initially sections were large enough for septic tanks to work as well as they could in peatlands, but it wasn't long before the 1882 drainage scheme was used for sewage connections. By 1904 complaints were being made about the blocked insanitary drain between Victoria and Anglesea Streets, resulting in a faltering start on a night soil service. The 1907 referendum, which approved purchase of the gasworks also agreed to raise a loan for sewage pipes (though rejected a plan for a steam tram). In 1917 Mayor Ellis rejected the Health Minister's suggestion, saying it was impossible to afford a sewage farm. By 1919 only about a third of the city had sewers, but between 1923 and 1925 "considerable progress" was made and sewage reticulation was further extended in 1933. However, there was a sewage related epidemic in Melville in 1940 and Melville, Fairfield and Hillcrest were added to the sewer network from 1949. Although by 1956 80% of Hamilton had sewage pipes, it was only piped to 14 septic tanks (17 when replaced in 1976), which were emptied several times a year, either into the Waitawhirwhiri Stream, or directly into the Waikato. In 1956 the Pollution Advisory Council said, "the daily flow of sewage effluent and trade wastes from Hamilton City is three million gallons… in effect, partly digested sludge and raw sewage is being disposed of into the Waikato River". Downstream from Hamilton contaminants increased 10 times between the 1950s and the early 1970s. The 1953 Water Pollution Act set up a Pollution Advisory Council, but it had no control powers until 1963.

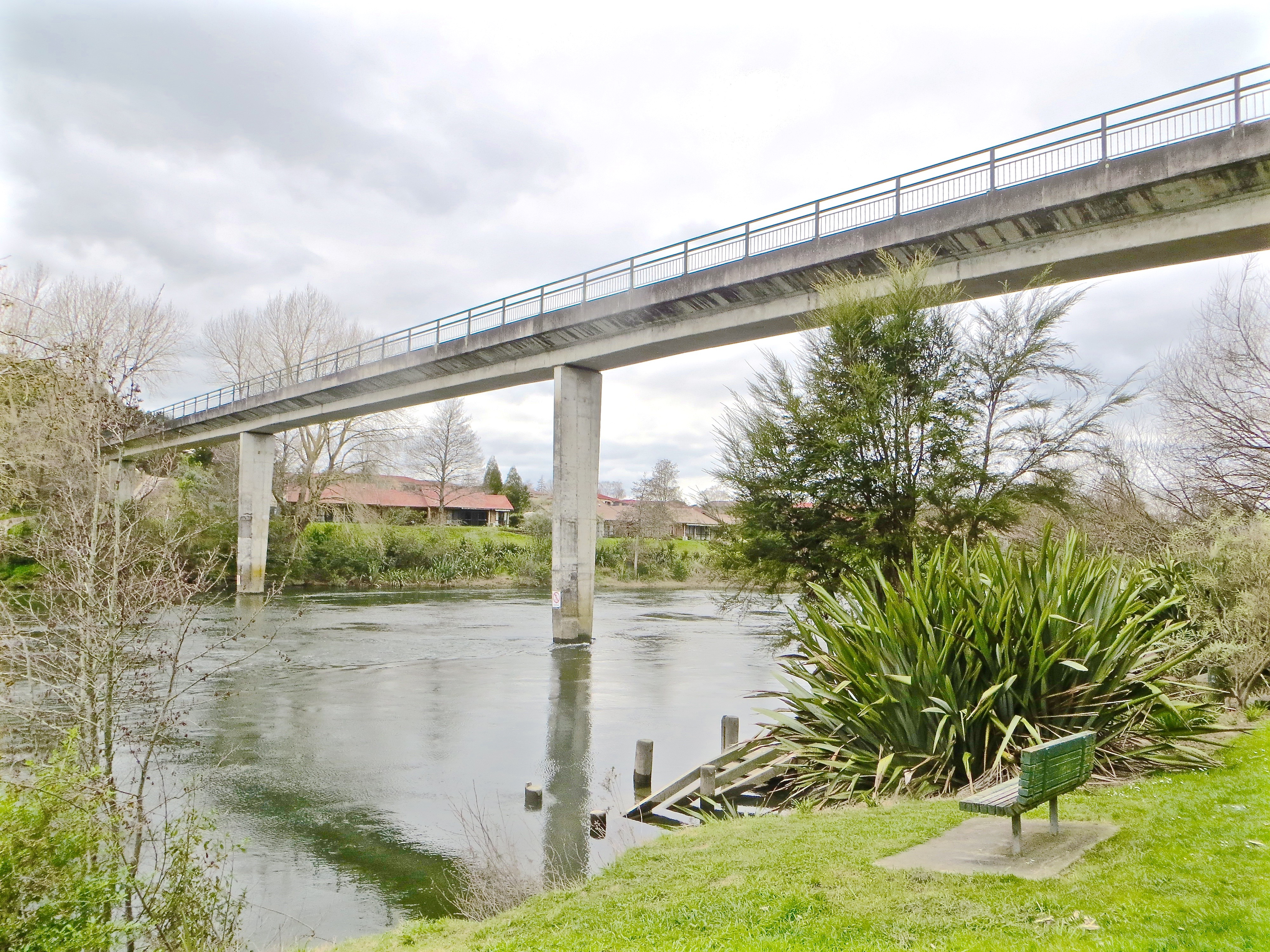
Pukete sewer bridge 165m long 14 m high built mid 1970s. Photo 2015.

In 1964, the Department of Health ordered adequate treatment for the sewage. Steven and Fitzmaurice, Consulting Engineers, presented a plan to Council early in 1966. There was some work on piping new areas in 1966, but work on the major trunks and interceptors didn't start until 1969 and building at Pukete sewage works started in January 1972. The first sewage was treated in July 1975 and was fully connected early in 1977.

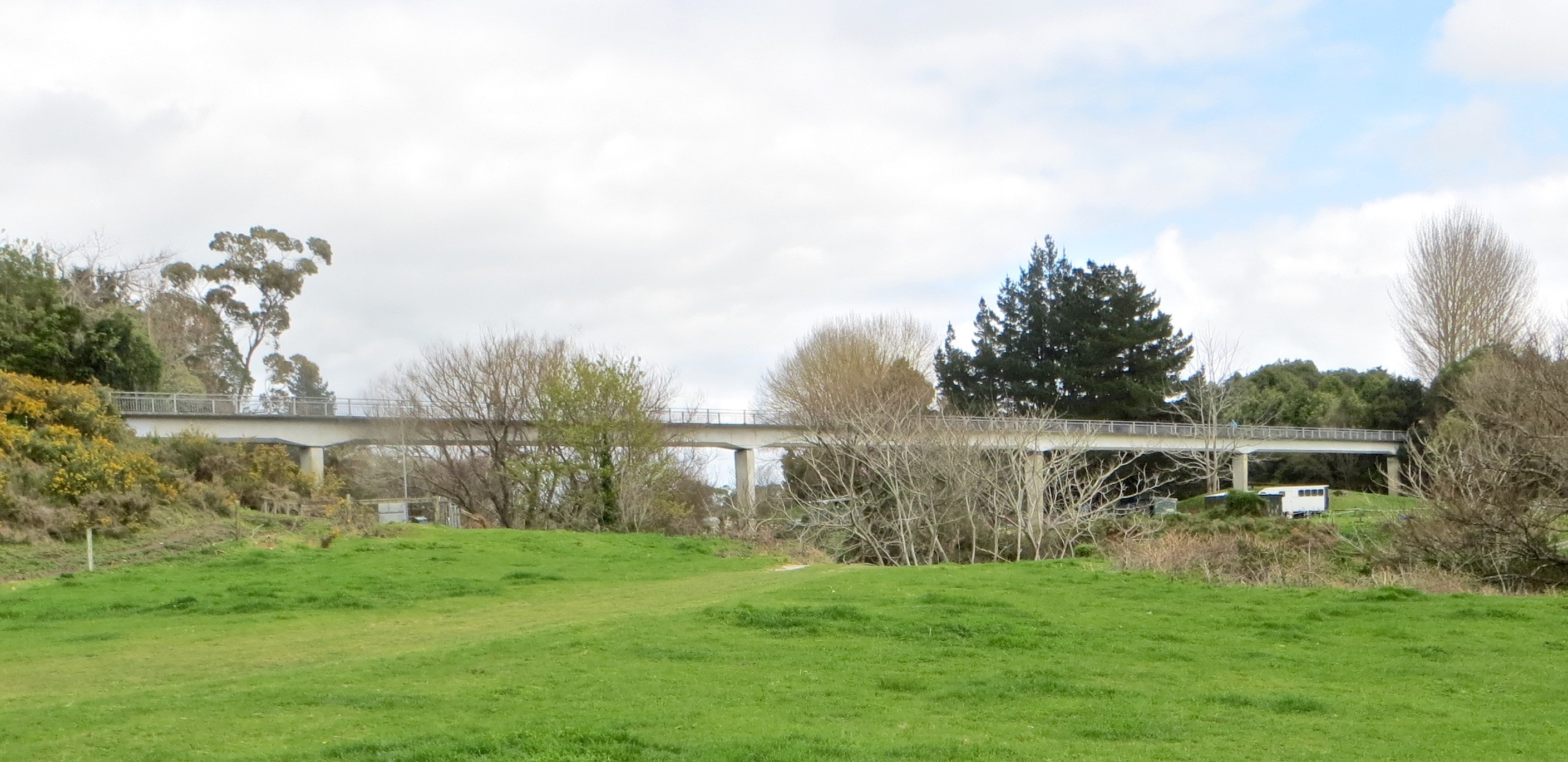
Prestressed concrete box girder bridge over Kirikiriroa Stream at Tauhara Gully. Photo 2015.

The trunk lines needed a 165-metre-long (541 ft) bridge, about 14 m (46 ft) above the Waikato, another prestressed concrete box girder bridge over Kirikiriroa Stream at Tauhara Gully and 2 steel pipe bridges over other gullies. The River bridge was designed by Murray-North Partners and the others by council engineers.

The Pukete sewage works cost $12.5m ($160m at 2015 prices). It now cleans 40 million litres (11,000,000 US gal)/day, which is aerated for about 2 hours in a sedimentation tank, disinfected with chlorine, dechlorinated with sulphur dioxide and discharged into the Waikato through a diffuser outfall on the river bed.

CH2M Beca, successor to the previous engineers, upgraded the plant from 1998 to 2002 to improve nitrogen, BOD and suspended solids levels, with a change from chlorination to UV treatment and biogas and natural gas 1.5 million watts (2,000 hp) cogeneration units, able to power the treatment processes and export surplus to the grid.

A further 5 year upgrade started about 2009 expanding and improving the plant, including phosphorus removal.

Despite the improvements there have been on-going problems. In 2012 the council was prosecuted for a sewage sludge spill and consent conditions were breached in 2013 due to a bacterial problem. In 2014 up to 800 m^{3} (180,000 imp gal) of untreated sewage got into the river.

There are also problems with pumping stations. Out of over 130, up to 20 fail each month.

=== Electricity ===
Hamilton was also late in getting electricity. Reefton had electricity from 1888. Some Hamiltonians had their own dynamos from about 1912, the year the first licence was given for building lines and a generating plant in the Frankton Town Board area. It cost over £8,000 (about $1.3m in 2017 prices) for the initial network, powered by two 45 kW (60 hp) DC Brush generators in Kent St, driven by two 4-cylinder 90 hp (67 kW) suction gas engines (suction gas engines used low pressure gas from coal), which started on 23 April 1913 (officially opened by Prime Minister Massey on 4 June). Lighting was provided for streets, houses and the Empire Hotel in Frankton, initially only from 7.30am to 5pm, using a labourer, a meter reader and two linesmen. Electricity was sold at 10d (2015 equivalent $15) per kWh. The first Chief Electrical Engineer was Mr A Beale, followed by Lloyd Mandeno, (1913–1916) and Israel (Jack) Webster, who stayed for nearly 40 years. From May 1916, Hamilton was connected and, in 1917, the supply area was widened to a 5-mile radius and an 80 kW (110 hp) and then two more 45 kW (60 hp) sets were added at Kent St. Despite this, by 1920, Frankton was unable to cope with demand. The mayor, P H Watts, proposed buying a second-hand steam plant for £17,000, but it was rejected at a poll on 23 April 1920. The mayor, 6 councillors and the electricity staff all resigned.

The problem was resolved by a link to Horahora Power Station completed, like Frankton, in 1913. In 1919 it was bought by the government and, by 1921, an 11 kV AC line linked it to Hamilton., allowing the "noisy, smoky", Kent St power station to close in July 1922, by which time it was rated at 170 kW.

There were over 1,500 connections in Hamilton by 1923. Undergrounding began in 1926, when the 11 kV cable was extended from Peachgrove Rd to Seddon Rd sub-station. By 1928 the council had 3,381 consumers and charges were down to 6d per kWh for lighting and 2d per kWh for power and heating. By 1935 4,458 were connected, with 55 mi (89 km) of line and lighting was down another penny. By 1950, the 11 kV rings in Hamilton East and Claudelands were finished. Soon afterwards mercury vapor street lighting was installed in London Street and Norton Rd. 33kV gas- and oil-filled cables were laid from 1960 and switched on in April 1974. By 1987 there were 12,247 connections, 291 km (181 mi) of line and charges down to 6.577c/kWh (about 13c in 2015 prices). In 2015 prices varied from 11.31 to 22.92 cents per kWh.

Legislation in 1988 amalgamated the Central Waikato Electric Power Board with Hamilton's Electricity Division from April 1989 as Waikato Electricity Limited, now known as WEL Networks, one of the distribution companies.

Hamilton now has a 220kV link to the National Grid and Transpower provides for a peak load of 187MW, expected to rise to 216MW by 2030.

== Notable people ==
- Jayden Bezzant, basketball player.
- Warren Gatland, Most capped Waikato Rugby player in history, born in Hamilton.
- Daniel Gillies, film actor.
- Kimbra Johnson, Grammy winning musician.
- Arthur Leong, NZ football player and captain 1959–64, lives in Hamilton.
- Dame Malvina Major, opera singer, born in Hamilton.
- Scott McLaughlin, racecar driver
- Anjali Mulari, New Zealand international ice and inline hockey player, lives in Hamilton.
- Richard O'Brien, creator of the Rocky Horror Picture Show, lived in Hamilton.
- Dame Patsy Reddy, lawyer and Governor-General, raised and educated in Hamilton.
- Frank Sargeson, author, born in Hamilton.
- Daniel Vettori, NZ cricketer, lives in Hamilton.
- Phum Viphurit, Thai-born singer-songwriter, raised in Hamilton.
- Stan Walker, Australian Idol Winner and singer-songwriter, educated in Hamilton.
- Terry Wiles, thalidomide victim and subject of the film On Giant's Shoulders

== Sister cities ==
Hamilton has five sister cities:

- Sacramento, United States
- Wuxi, People's Republic of China
- Saitama, Japan
- Chengdu, People's Republic of China
- Ypres, Belgium
