= Hamilton Astronomical Society Observatory =

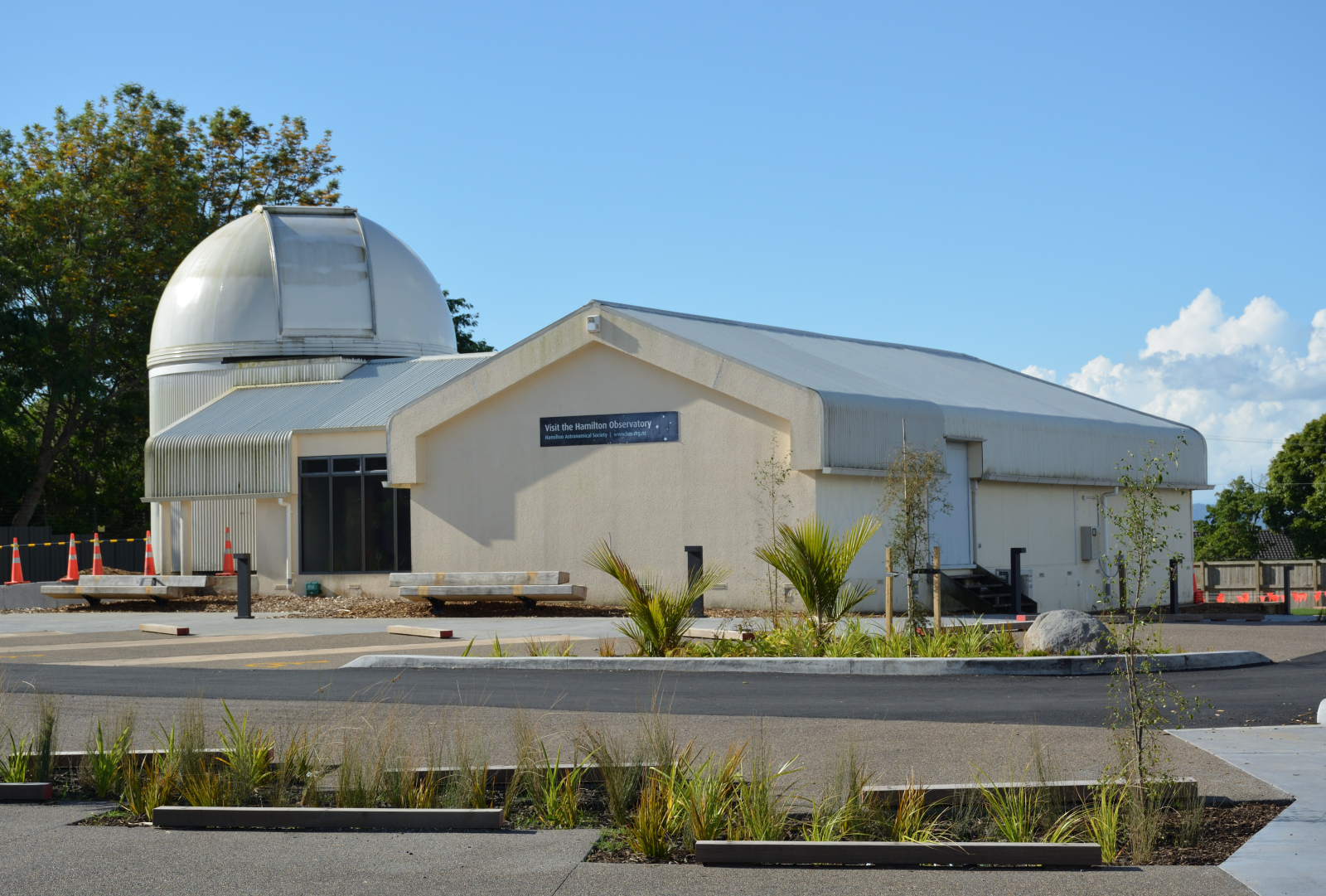
- Location: New Zealand
- Coordinates: 37°46′24″S 175°13′01″E
- Altitude: 40 m (130 ft)

Telescopes
- 24" Cassegrain: Classical Cassegrain

The Hamilton Astronomical Society Observatory is located next to the Hamilton Zoo in Brymer Road to the west of Hamilton City, New Zealand. The Hamilton Astronomical Society was founded on 3 July 1933 and is one of New Zealand's oldest astronomical societies.

The observatory instruments include one 24" Classical cassegrain telescope, a 14" and 8" Schmidt-Cassegrain telescope, a Lunt 60mm Solar telescope, an 8" Dobsonian telescope, and two 12" Dobsonian telescopes.

The observatory is open to the public on the first Wednesday of every month at 7:30 p.m. (8:30 p.m. during daylight saving).

== History ==
The Hamilton Astronomical Society's first dedicated meeting house was the observatory, built at the Hamilton Zoo site in 1984. The observing dome for the 24" Classical Cassegrain telescope was completed in 1997, and opened by Sir Patrick Moore.
