= The Great Race (rowing) =

The Great Race (or Harry Mahon Trophy) was an annual rowing race between the men's eight from the University of Waikato, New Zealand and a prominent university team (or teams) from outside New Zealand. The race was held over a 4.8 kilometre stretch of the Waikato River in Hamilton and was raced upstream. The women race for the Bryan Gould Cup.

== History ==
Previously, the University of Waikato had raced the University of Auckland over the Waikato River course in an annual fixture, which was first held in 1989. Known then as the 'Gallagher Boathouse Eights', the event was organised by Waikato University Sport & Recreation Manager Bill Crome and received huge local support from the people of Hamilton. Waikato won the first encounter against Auckland with a crew that contained three former Olympic representatives, Nigel Atherfold, Greg Johnston and Chris White, with the rest of the crew consisting of Waikato Rowing Club oarsmen, Andy Mahon, Nik Posa and Richard Kirke, and Stephen Hatfield and Chris Spanninga from the Hamilton Rowing Club, and coxswain Russell Robson.

The race in its current (international) format was the creation of British politician Bryan Gould, who was a former vice-chancellor of the University of Waikato and a graduate of the University of Oxford. The winners receive the right to hold the Harry Mahon memorial trophy. Harry Mahon, who was born in New Zealand, was a highly respected rowing coach for the Cambridge rowing team and the Olympic British rowing eight. He led many crews to World Championship and Olympic medals. Harry Mahon died of liver cancer in 2001.

The race has been organised by U Leisure from the University of Waikato and Olympic rower Rob Hamill since its conception.

The first race was held on 1 September 2002 where the University of Waikato crew led from the start and won by many boat lengths over the Cambridge University crew. For the second race, held on 7 September 2003, the Oxford crew got out to an early lead of two boat lengths by the first bridge. By half way, the Waikato crew had caught up and powered home to win the race by two boat lengths.

Since 2011, the tenth anniversary race, the format changed from the two boat competition of previous races, to a three boat competition. In 2011 the Waikato crew beat out University of Melbourne and Cambridge University, after Cambridge was forced to row without a rudder following a collision with Waikato; the race was restarted following the collision, caused by Cambridge failing to yield to the Waikato boat.

== Layout ==
The boats used for the Great Race are custom built identical heavyweight men's eights from KIRS (Kiwi International Rowing Skiffs) in Cambridge, New Zealand. The nature of the river creates a highly technical course, with the current frequently switching from side to side of the river over the length of the course. This creates an advantage to the team on the side that the current is not on. The current ranges in speed from 0.64 m/s to 1.30 m/s. The slower water has the potential of slowing down a rowing boat down by 1.5 km/h over the length of the race. The race passes under four bridges along its length.

The visiting crew is flown out to New Zealand, where their itinerary includes accommodation and use of rowing facilities at Lake Karapiro. The race is organized by both crews and visiting coxswains and coaches are given full briefings on the complexities of the Waikato River and the race course. The event receives coverage from the local media in Hamilton.

Rowing on the river starts at 9 am with corporate crews battling for work place bragging rights. This is followed by the secondary school races, which has the top NZ school crews and girls) racing over a 3 km upstream course. The boys' race is traditionally between Hamilton Boys' High School and various other schools from around the Waikato and Auckland. The day culminates in the two international races – the Bryan Gould Cup (woman) and the Harry Mahon Trophy (men) – raced over the 4.2 km Great Race course.

The event draws crowds of 20,000 + to the river banks in Hamilton and is covered by national radio and television. Spectator entertainment takes on a carnival atmosphere with corporate hosting, street theatre, displays, competitions and markets, and popular NZ and local music acts performing. The day before the race the two teams compete on indoor rowing machines, initially for fun, but now used to determine starting positions for the race. The Waikato River is sacred to the local Tainui Maori tribe, and a ceremonial haka (war dance) is performed on the boat ramp and a waka (traditional Maori canoe) leads off the two crews to the start line.

== Harry Mahon Trophy results ==
Year	Winner	Runner-up	Second runner-up
2002	University of Waikato	University of Cambridge
2003	University of Waikato	University of Oxford
2004	University of Cambridge	University of Waikato
2005	University of Waikato	University of Washington
2006	University of Waikato	University of Cambridge
2007	University of Waikato	Harvard University
2008	University of Cambridge	University of Waikato
2009	University of Waikato	University of Oxford
2010	University of Cambridge	University of Waikato
2011	University of Waikato	University of Melbourne	University of Cambridge
2012	University of Sydney	University of Waikato	University of Queensland
2013	University of Waikato	University of Sydney	University of Cambridge
2014	University of Waikato	Harvard University	University of Melbourne
2015	Harvard University	University of Cambridge	University of Waikato

== Bryan Gould Cup results ==
Year	Winner	Runner-up	Second runner-up
2006	University of Melbourne	University of Waikato
2007	University of Waikato	University of Melbourne
2008	University of Waikato	University of Sydney
2009	University of Waikato	University of Sydney
2010	University of Sydney	University of Waikato
2011	University of Waikato	University of Melbourne	University of Sydney
2012	University of Waikato	University of Sydney	University of Queensland
2013	University of Waikato	University of Sydney	University of Melbourne
2014	University of Washington	University of Waikato	University of Melbourne
2015	University of Waikato	University of Sydney	University of Melbourne

Previous races were against the Australian National Crew (2005), University of Melbourne (2004), NZ Women Academy Crew (2003) and a Cambridge Invitation (2002). Results for these races are not known.
