= List of Super Rugby centurions =

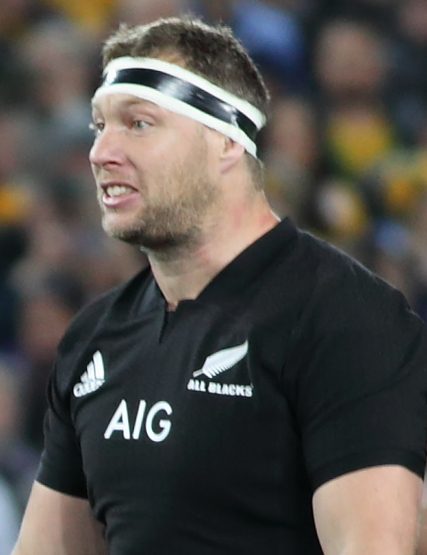
Wyatt Crockett is the top New Zealand centurion, retiring after 202 Super Rugby matches.

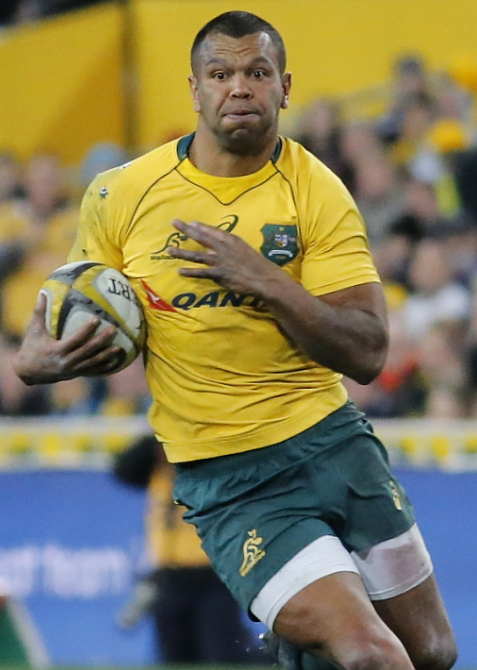
Kurtley Beale has played 187 Super Rugby matches for the Waratahs, the Rebels and Force.

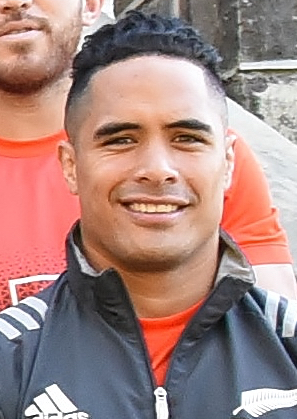
Aaron Smith is the 4th most capped centurion, playing 185 times, all for the Highlanders.

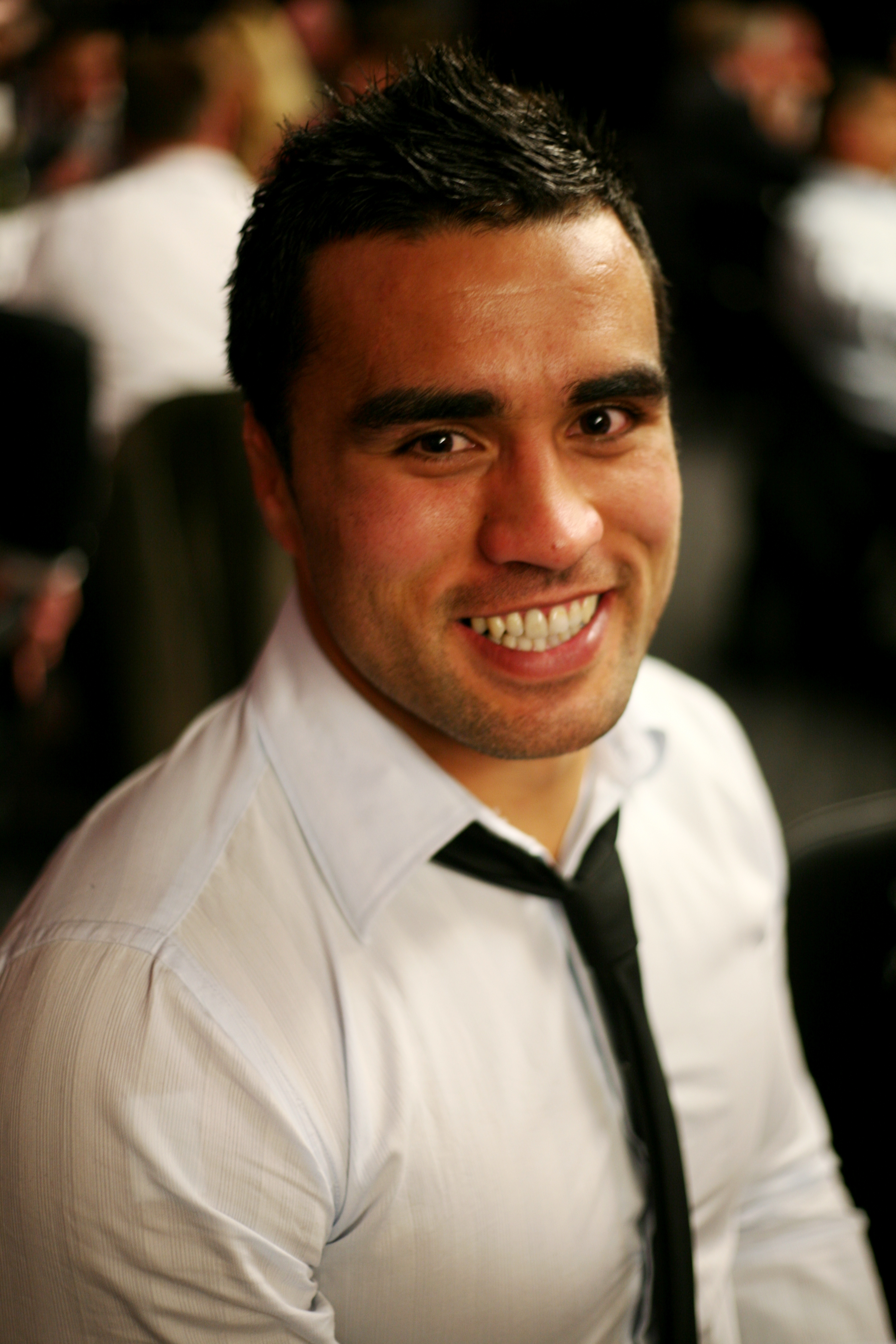
Liam Messam played 182 Super Rugby matches before retiring, all for the Chiefs.

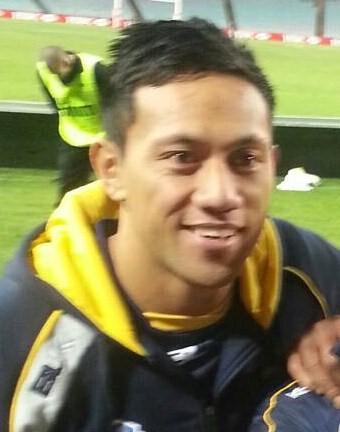
Christian Leali'ifano is one of four centurions to represent Moana Pasifika.

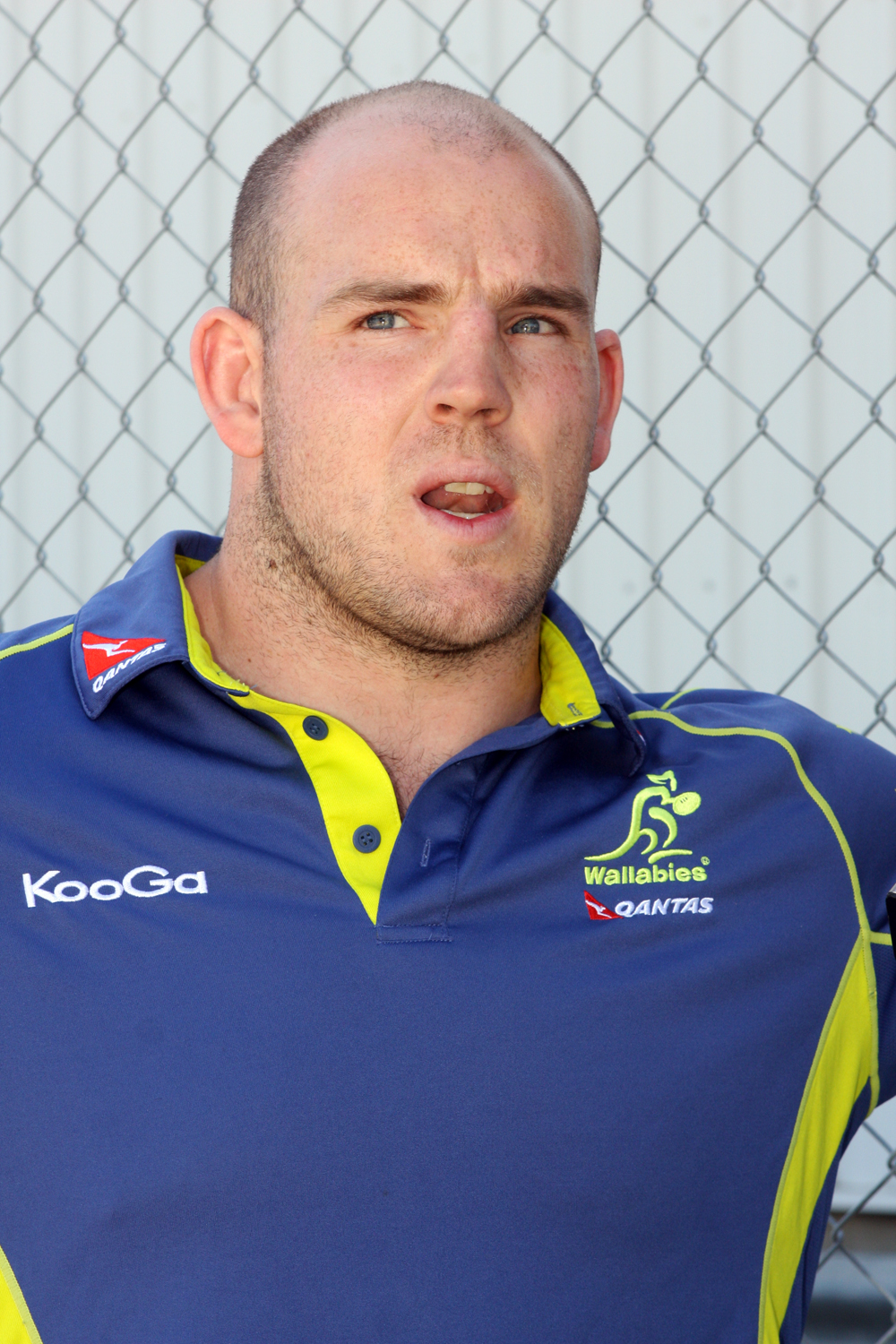
Stephen Moore retired after appearing in 175 Super Rugby matches.

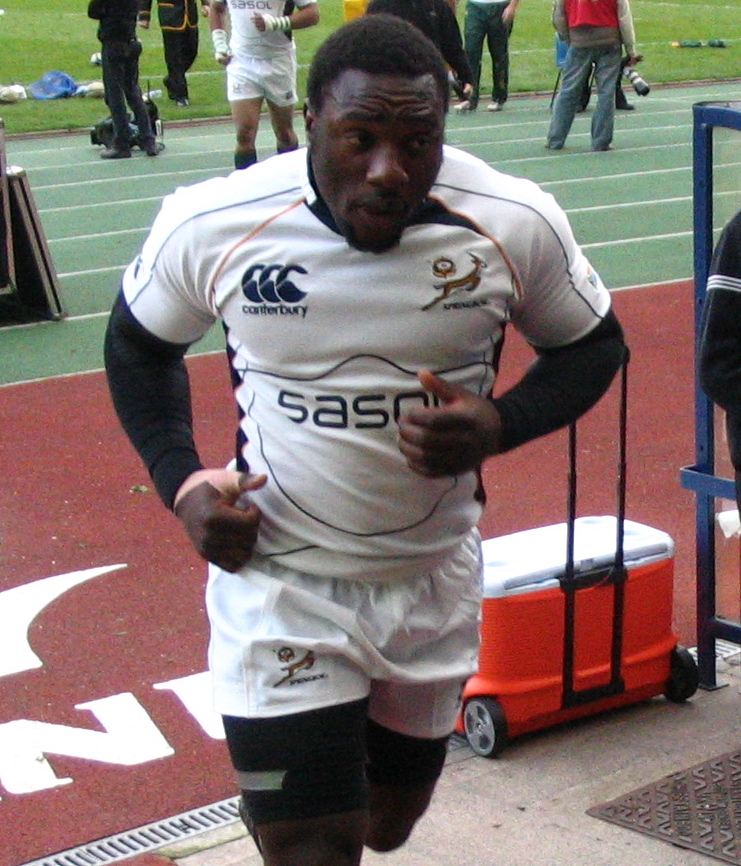
Tendai Mtawarira is the top South African centurion, retiring after 159 Super Rugby matches.

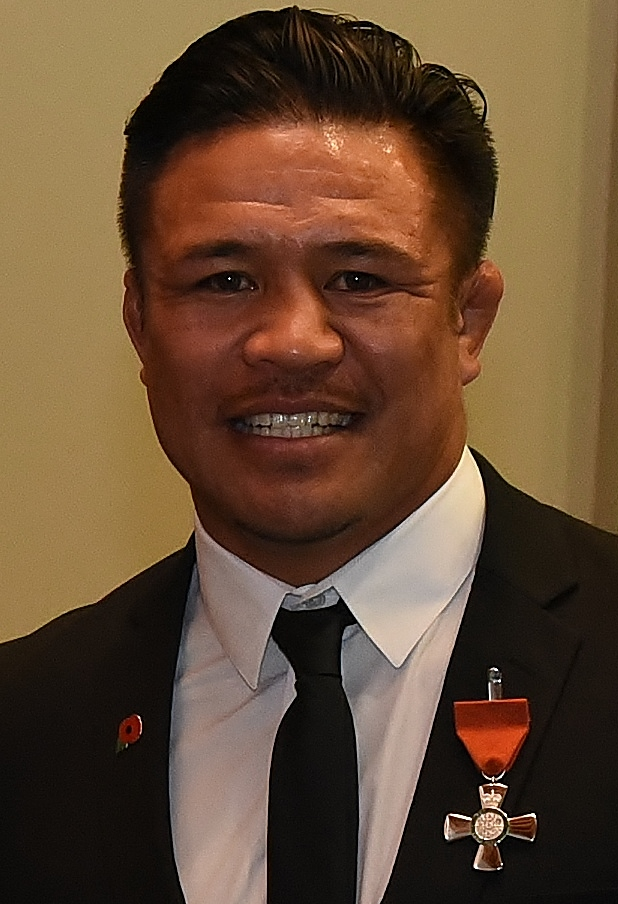
Kevin Mealamu played 175 Super Rugby matches before retiring.

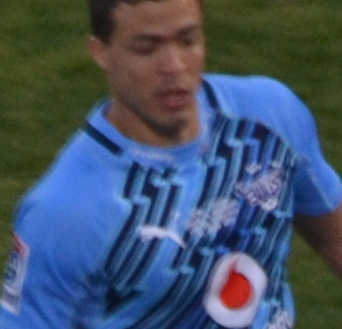
Bjorn Basson is the only Super Rugby centurion to have played for the Griquas in Super Rugby.

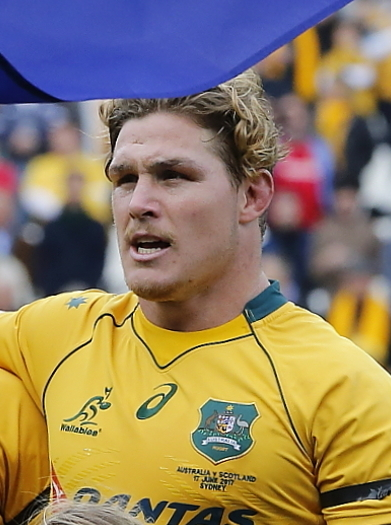
Michael Hooper has played for the Brumbies and the Waratahs in Super Rugby.

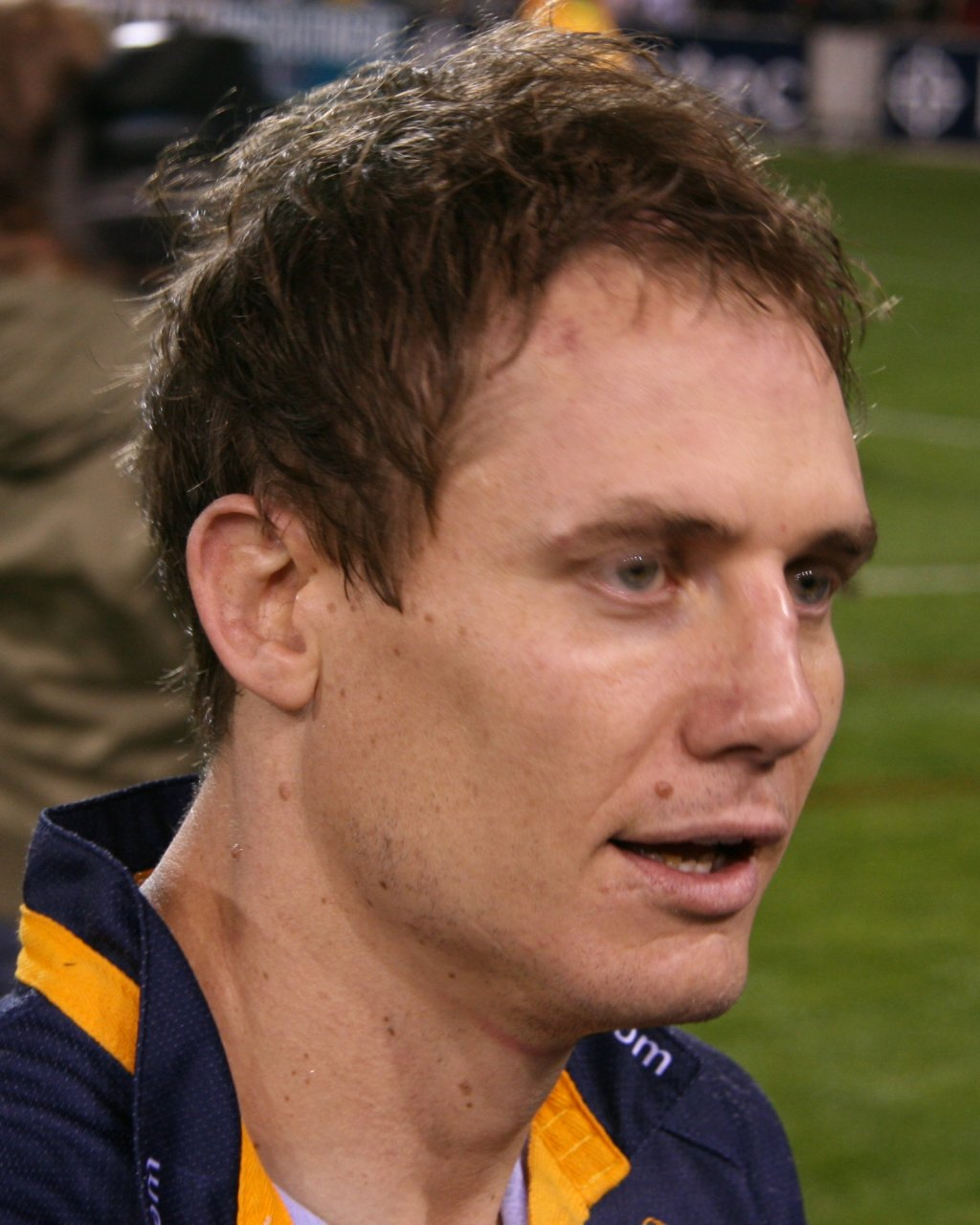
Stephen Larkham made all his Super Rugby appearances for the Brumbies.

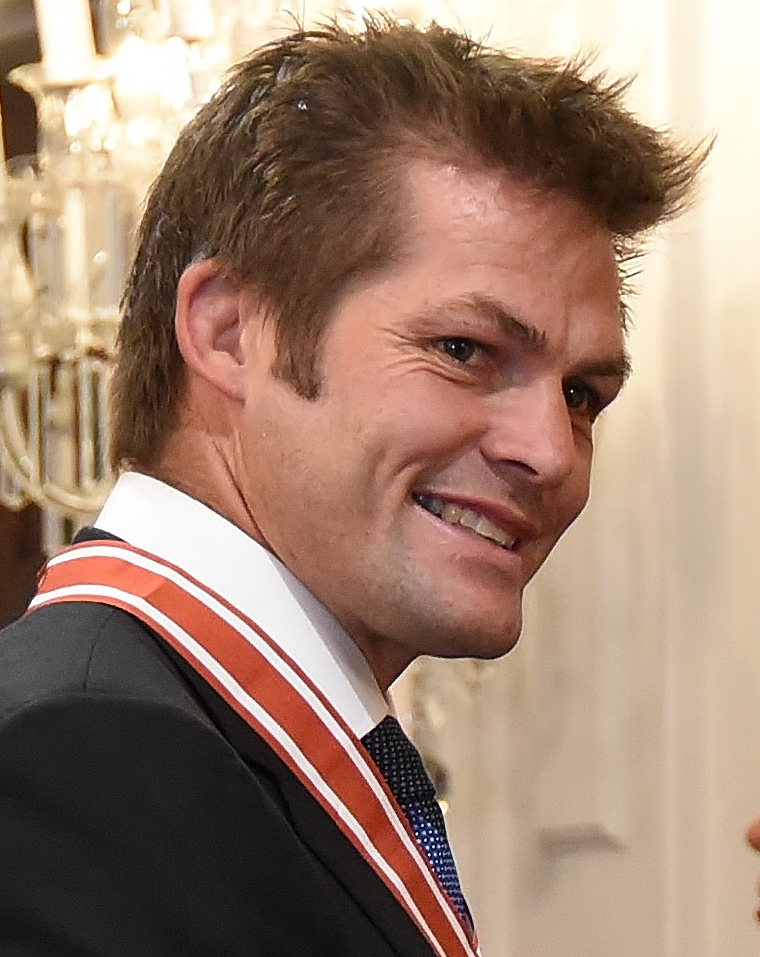
Richie McCaw was a Super Rugby centurion as well as winning World Rugby Men's 15s Player of the Year a joint record three times.

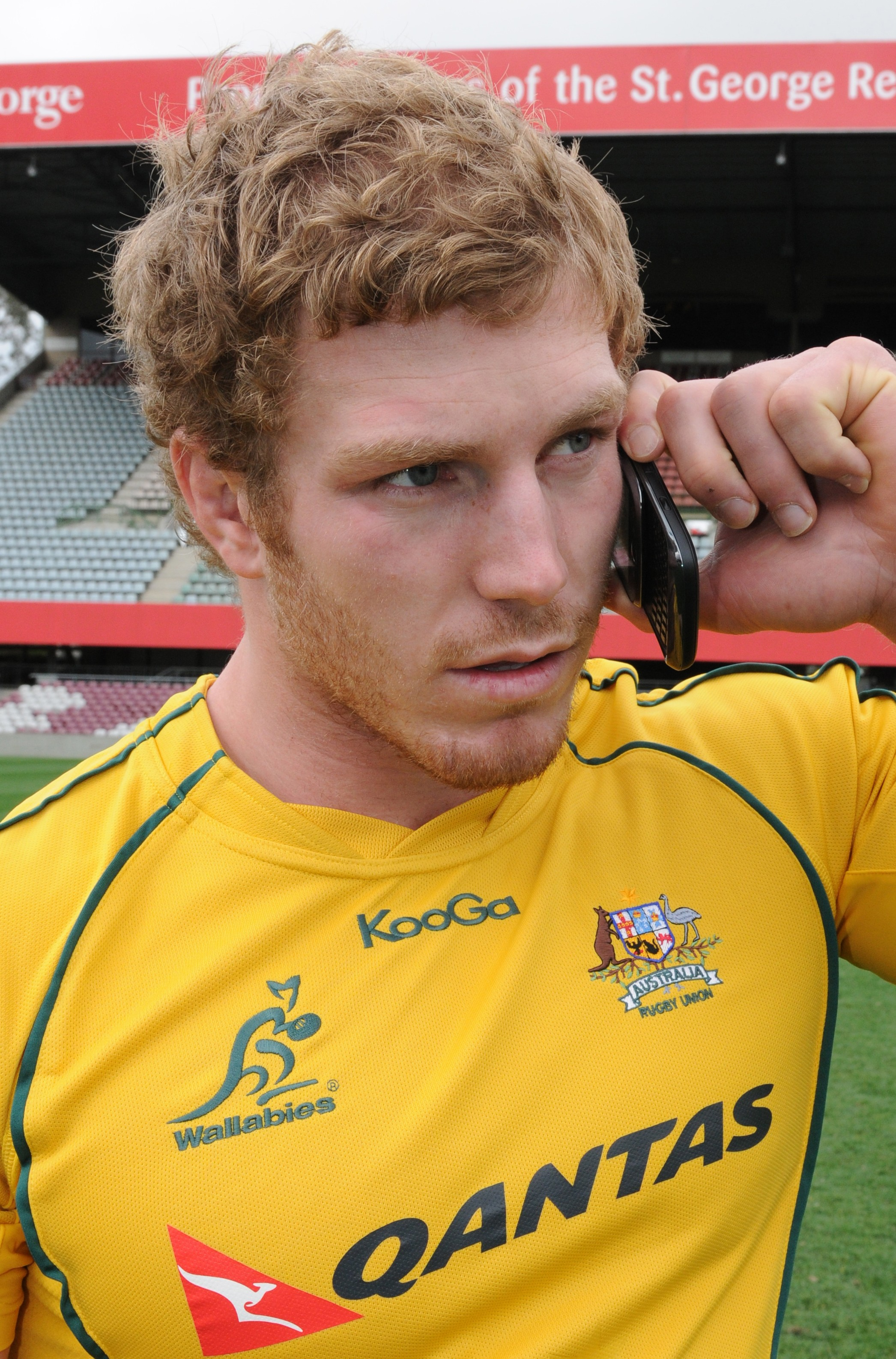
David Pocock played for the Force and the Brumbies in Super Rugby.

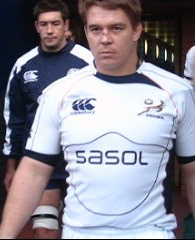
John Smit played for the Sharks for 13 seasons.

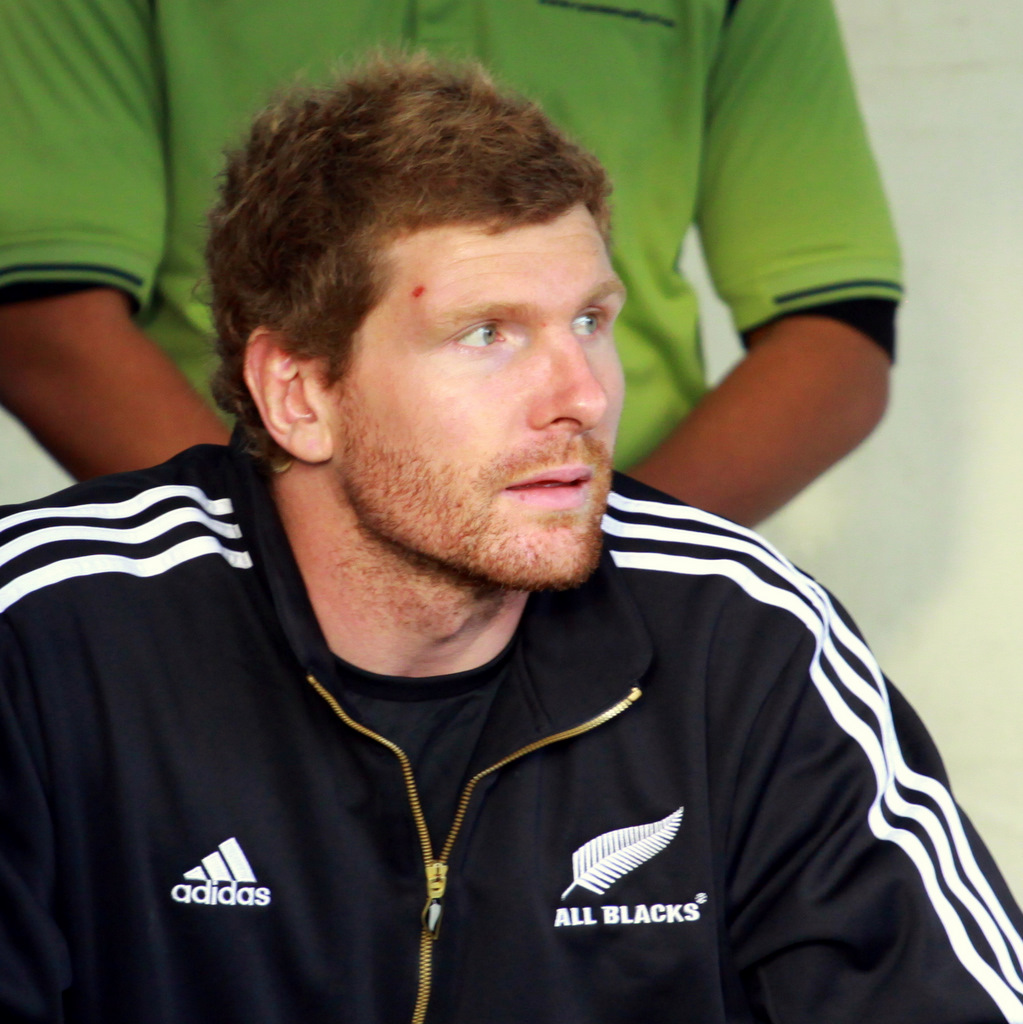
Adam Thomson played for the Highlanders, Reds, Rebels and Chiefs in Super Rugby.

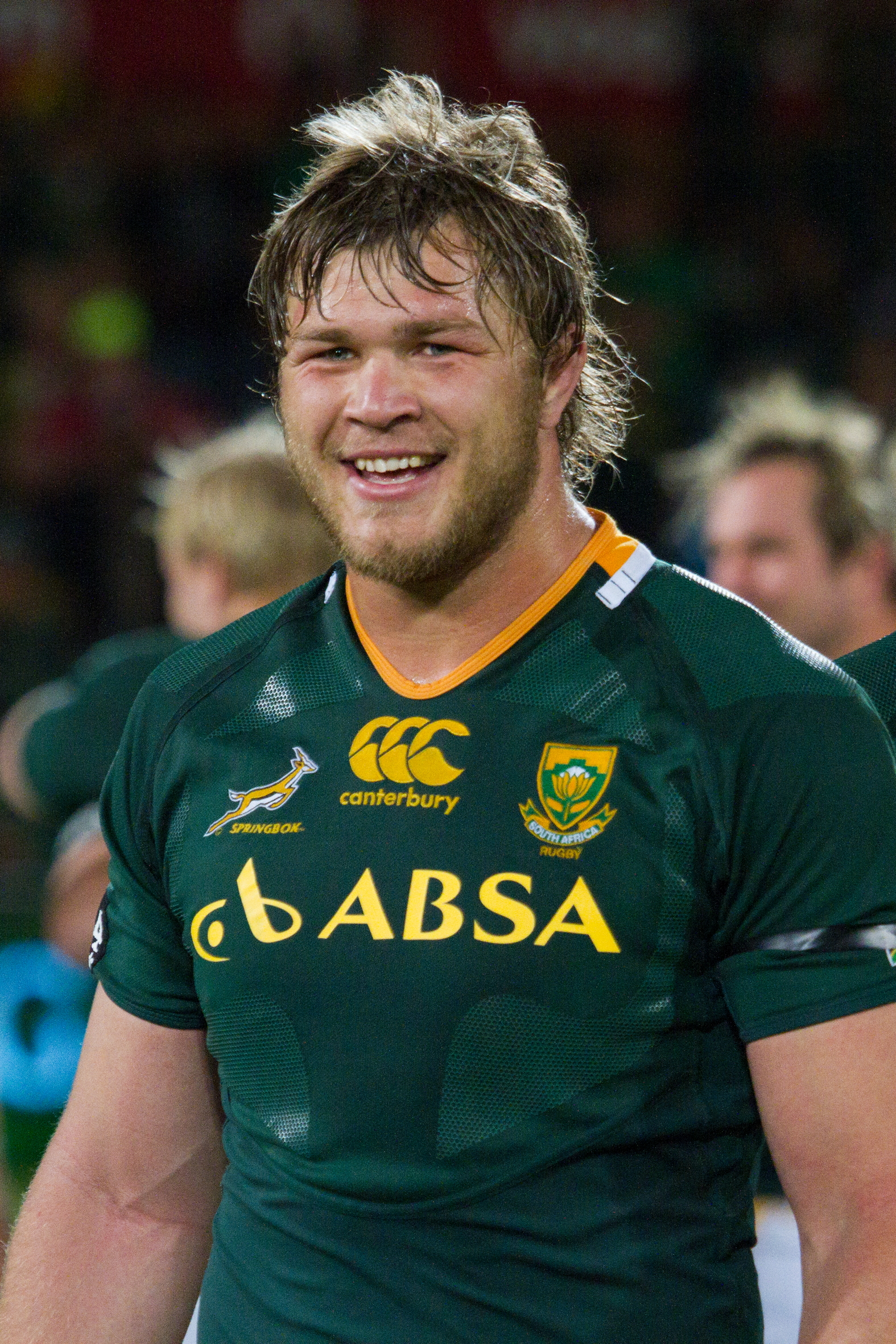
Duane Vermeulen played for the Cheetahs, Stormers and Bulls in Super Rugby.

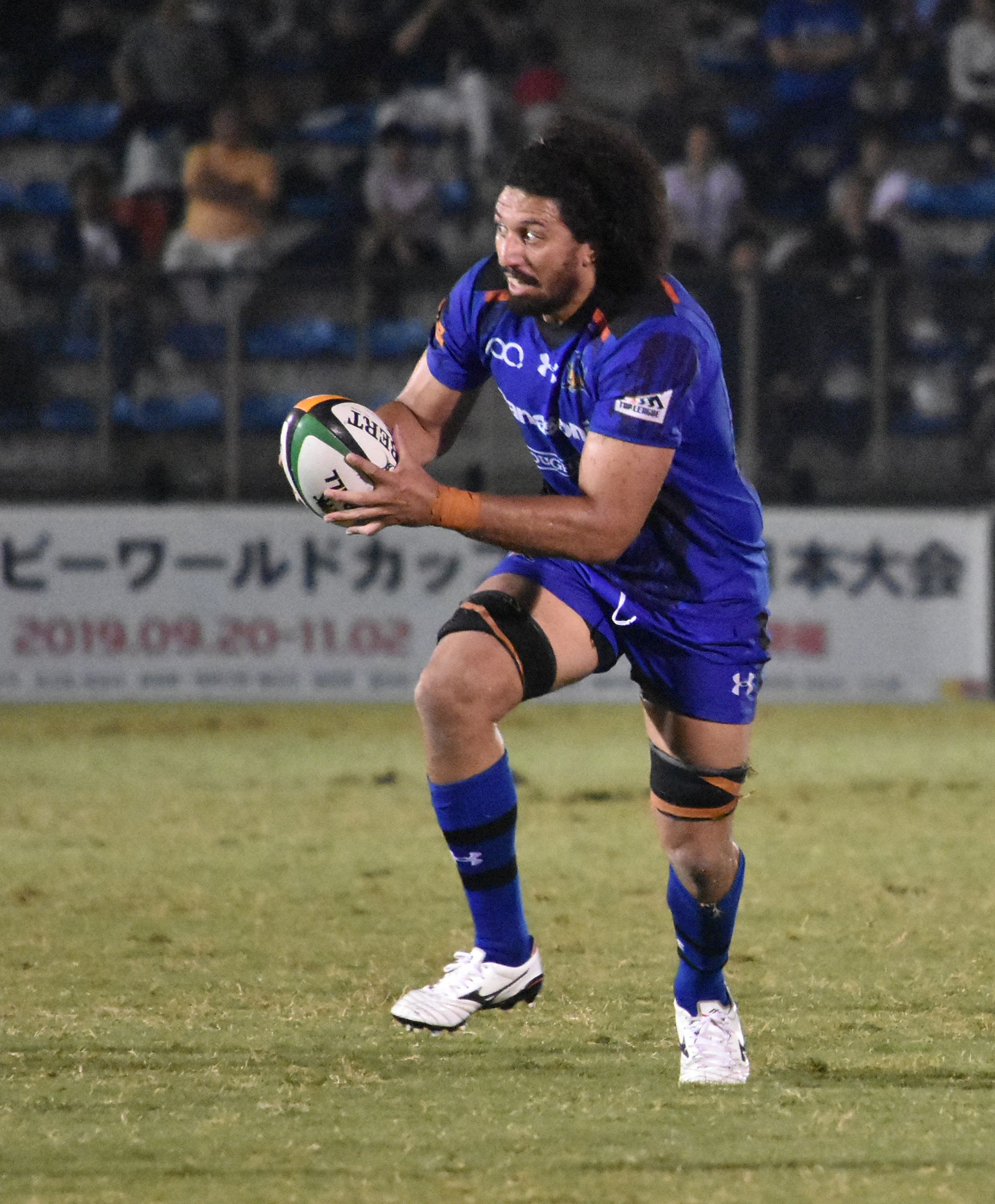
Sam Wykes is the only Super Rugby centurion to have played for the Sunwolves.

Below is a listing of all Super Rugby players that have appeared in 100 or more matches during their career:

== Top 10 ==
The following 10 players are the top appearance makers in Super Rugby.

List of Top 10 Super Rugby appearance makers
Player	Nationality	Teams (years)	Appearances
James Slipper	Australia	Reds (2010–2018), Brumbies (2019–)	212
Wyatt Crockett	New Zealand	Crusaders (2006–2018)	202
Kurtley Beale	Australia	Waratahs (2007–2011, 2014–2016, 2018–2020), Rebels (2012–2013), Force (2024–)	187
Aaron Smith	New Zealand	Highlanders (2011–2023)	185
Liam Messam	New Zealand	Chiefs (2006–2018, 2021)	182
Sam Whitelock	New Zealand	Crusaders (2009–2023)	181
Beauden Barrett	New Zealand	Hurricanes (2011–2019), Blues (2020, 2022–2023, 2025–)	180
Christian Lealiifano	Australia; Samoa	Brumbies (2008–2019), Moana Pasifika (2022–2024)	180
Owen Franks	New Zealand	Crusaders (2009–2019, 2024), Hurricanes (2022–2023)	179
Angus Ta'avao	New Zealand	Blues (2012–2015, 2024–2025), Waratahs (2016–2017), Chiefs (2018–2023), Highlanders (2026–)	178

== Other centurions ==
The following list is of all remaining Super Rugby centurians. As no definitive source of number of appearances exist, players are listed in alphabetical order.

List of Super Rugby centenarians
Player	Nationality	Teams (years)
John Afoa	New Zealand	Blues (2004–2011), Crusaders (2023)
Allan Alaalatoa	Australia	Brumbies (2014–)
Willem Alberts	South Africa	Lions (2005–2009, 2020), Sharks (2010–2015)
Ben Alexander	Australia	Brumbies (2008–2018)
Adam Ashley-Cooper	Australia	Brumbies (2005–2011), Waratahs (2012–2015, 2019)
Jordie Barrett	New Zealand	Hurricanes (2017–2024, 2026–)
Scott Barrett	New Zealand	Crusaders (2014–)
Bjorn Basson	South Africa	Cheetahs (2009–2010), Bulls (2011–2016), Stormers (2017), Griquas (2020)
Al Baxter	Australia	Waratahs (2000–2011)
Josh Bekhuis	New Zealand	Highlanders (2009–2014, 2023), Blues (2015–2016)
Andries Bekker	South Africa	Stormers (2005–2013)
Meyer Bosman	South Africa	Cheetahs (2006–2010), Sharks (2011–2013)
Jacques Botes	South Africa	Sharks (2005–2013)
Bakkies Botha	South Africa	Bulls (2002–2011)
George Bower	New Zealand	Crusaders (2019–)
Tony Brown	New Zealand	Highlanders (1996–2004, 2011), Sharks (2006), Stormers (2008)
Schalk Burger	South Africa	Stormers (2004–2016)
Jock Campbell	Australia	Reds (2019–2026)
Sam Cane	New Zealand	Chiefs (2011–2023)
Brendan Cannon	Australia	Reds (1996–2000), Waratahs (2000–2005), Force (2006–2007)
Nizaam Carr	South Africa	Stormers (2012–2018), Bulls (2020)
Dan Carter	New Zealand	Crusaders (2003–2015)
Sam Carter	Australia	Brumbies (2011–2019), Force (2024–2025)
Mitchell Chapman	Australia	Reds (2005–2007), Brumbies (2009–2011), Waratahs (2013–2015)
Mark Chisholm	Australia	Brumbies (2003–2011)
Finlay Christie	New Zealand	Chiefs (2017), Hurricanes (2018–2019), Blues (2020–)
Dane Coles	New Zealand	Hurricanes (2009–2023)
Justin Collins	New Zealand	Chiefs (1998), Blues (1999–2009)
Liam Coltman	New Zealand	Highlanders (2012–2022)
Quade Cooper	Australia	Reds (2007–2015, 2017–2018), Rebels (2019)
Jimmy Cowan	New Zealand	Highlanders (2003–2012), Blues (2015)
Pekahou Cowan	Australia	Force (2006–2017, 2020), Waratahs (2021)
Ryan Crotty	New Zealand	Crusaders (2006–2019, 2024)
Aaron Cruden	New Zealand	Hurricanes (2010–2011), Chiefs (2012–2017, 2020)
Israel Dagg	New Zealand	Highlanders (2009–2010), Crusaders (2011–2018)
Keegan Daniel	South Africa	Sharks (2006–2014, 2016–2017)
Filipo Daugunu	Australia	Reds (2018–2023, 2025–), Rebels (2024)
Jack Debreczeni	New Zealand	Rebels (2014–2018), Chiefs (2019), Brumbies (2023–2025), Waratahs (2026)
Dave Dennis	Australia	Waratahs (2007–2016)
Jean de Villiers	South Africa	Stormers (2005–2009, 2011–2015)
Ash Dixon	New Zealand	Hurricanes (2013–2014), Highlanders (2015–2021)
Elliot Dixon	New Zealand	Highlanders (2012–2019)
Stephen Donald	New Zealand	Chiefs (2006–2011, 2016–2017, 2019)
Kane Douglas	Australia	Waratahs (2010–2014), Reds (2016–2018)
Mitchell Drummond	New Zealand	Crusaders (2014–)
Matt Dunning	Australia	Waratahs (2001–2009), Force (2010–2011)
Bismarck du Plessis	South Africa	Sharks (2005–2015)
Jannie du Plessis	South Africa	Cheetahs (2006–2007), Sharks (2008–2015), Lions (2020)
Fourie du Preez	South Africa	Bulls (2003–2011)
Hika Elliot	New Zealand	Chiefs (2006–2017)
Andy Ellis	New Zealand	Crusaders (2006–2016)
Tamati Ellison	New Zealand	Blues (2005), Hurricanes (2006–2010), Highlanders (2012–2013), Rebels (2014–2016)
Sef Fa'agase	New Zealand	Reds (2015–2018, 2022–2025), Highlanders (2019), Rebels (2022), Force (2026–)
Colby Fainga'a	Australia	Brumbies (2010–2013), Rebels (2014–2018)
Saia Fainga'a	Australia	Brumbies (2006–2008, 2017), Reds (2009–2016)
Tetera Faulkner	Australia	Force (2011–2017), Rebels (2018–2019), Waratahs (2020–2023)
Corey Flynn	New Zealand	Crusaders (2002–2014)
Bernard Foley	Australia	Waratahs (2011–2019, 2027–)
Ben Franks	New Zealand	Crusaders (2006–2012), Hurricanes (2013–2015)
Adam Freier	Australia	Brumbies (2000–2002), Waratahs (2003–2010), Rebels (2011–2012)
Hosea Gear	New Zealand	Hurricanes (2004–2011), Highlanders (2012–2013), Chiefs (2015)
Will Genia	Australia	Reds (2007–2015), Rebels (2018–2019)
Mark Gerrard	Australia	Waratahs (2001–2002), Brumbies (2003–2009), Rebels (2011–2012)
Matt Giteau	Australia	Brumbies (2001–2006, 2010–2011), Force (2007–2009)
Kyle Godwin	Australia; Zimbabwe	Force (2012–2016, 2020–2022), Brumbies (2017–2018)
Jake Gordon	Australia	Waratahs (2017–)
Peter Grant	South Africa	Stormers (2006–2014), Force (2016–2017)
George Gregan	Australia	Brumbies (1996–2007)
Bryan Habana	South Africa	Bulls (2005–2009), Stormers (2010–2013)
Bryn Hall	New Zealand	Blues (2013–2016), Crusaders (2017–2022), Hurricanes (2027–)
James Hanson	Australia	Reds (2010–2015), Rebels (2016–2017, 2021–2022)
Sean Hardman	Australia	Reds (2000–2010)
David Havili	New Zealand	Crusaders (2015–2026)
Bryce Hegarty	Australia	Rebels (2013–2015, Waratahs (2016–2018), Reds (2019–2021), Force (2023)
Nic Henderson	Australia	Brumbies (2004–2009), Force (2010), Rebels (2011–2013)
Scott Higginbotham	Australia	Reds (2008–2012, 2017–2019), Rebels (2013–2015)
Reece Hodge	Australia	Rebels (2016–2023)
Matt Hodgson	Australia	Force (2006–2017)
Stephen Hoiles	Australia	Waratahs (2004–2006, 2014–2015), Brumbies (2007–2011)
Jed Holloway	Australia	Waratahs (2013–2020, 2022–2024)
Greg Holmes	Australia	Reds (2005–2016), Force (2020–2022)
Michael Hooper	Australia	Brumbies (2010–2012), Waratahs (2013–2020, 2022–2023)
Andrew Hore	New Zealand	Crusaders (2001), Hurricanes (2002–2011), Highlanders (2012–2013)
Rob Horne	Australia	Waratahs (2008–2017)
James Horwill	Australia	Reds (2006–2015)
Doug Howlett	New Zealand	Highlanders (1997), Hurricanes (1998), Blues (1999–2007)
Mitch Inman	Australia	Force (2010–2011), Rebels (2012–2017)
Akira Ioane	New Zealand; Samoa	Blues (2015–2024)
Rieko Ioane	New Zealand	Blues (2016–2025, 2027–)
Chris Jack	New Zealand	Crusaders (1999–2007, 2010–2011)
Adi Jacobs	South Africa	Bulls (2001–2002), Cats (2003), Sharks (2004–2011)
Luke Jacobson	New Zealand	Chiefs (2018–)
Cory Jane	New Zealand	Hurricanes (2007–2012, 2014–2017)
Elton Jantjies	South Africa	Lions (2011–2012, 2014–2020), Stormers (2013)
Harry Johnson-Holmes	Australia	Waratahs (2018–2024), Force (2026)
Jerome Kaino	New Zealand	Blues (2004–2012, 2014–2018)
Ryan Kankowski	South Africa	Sharks (2006–2015)
Sekope Kepu	Australia	Waratahs (2008–2019), Moana Pasifika (2022–2024)
Chris King	New Zealand	Crusaders (2003–2004, 2018), Highlanders (2005–2014)
Du'Plessis Kirifi	New Zealand	Hurricanes (2019–)
Steven Kitshoff	South Africa	Stormers (2011–2015, 2017–2020)
Siya Kolisi	South Africa	Stormers (2012–2020)
Werner Kruger	South Africa	Bulls (2008–2016)
Tevita Kuridrani	Australia	Brumbies (2012–2020), Force (2021)
Stephen Larkham	Australia	Brumbies (1996–2007)
Chris Latham	Australia	Waratahs (1997–1998), Reds (1998–2008)
Tanerau Latimer	New Zealand	Crusaders (2006), Chiefs (2007–2014), Blues (2016)
Nepo Laulala	New Zealand	Crusaders (2013–2015), Chiefs (2017–2020), Blues (2021–2023)
Ollie le Roux	South Africa	Sharks (1996–2003), Cats (2005), Cheetahs (2006–2007)
Anton Lienert-Brown	New Zealand	Chiefs (2014–2025, 2027–)
Daniel Lienert-Brown	New Zealand	Crusaders (2014), Highlanders (2015–2026), Chiefs (2027–)
Tyrel Lomax	New Zealand	Rebels (2017), Highlanders (2018–2019), Hurricanes (2020–)
Ryan Lonergan	Australia	Brumbies (2017–)
David Lyons	Australia	Waratahs (2000–2008)
Leon MacDonald	New Zealand	Crusaders (1997, 1999–2003, 2005–2009), Chiefs (1998)
Frans Malherbe	South Africa	Stormers (2011–2020)
Lionel Mapoe	South Africa	Cheetahs (2010), Lions (2011–2012, 2014–2019), Bulls (2013)
Justin Marshall	New Zealand	Crusaders (1996–2005)
Victor Matfield	South Africa	Cats (1999–2000), Bulls (2001–2011, 2014–2015)
Alby Mathewson	New Zealand	Hurricanes (2007–2009), Blues (2010–2012), Force (2013–2016)
Ben May	New Zealand	Crusaders (2007), Chiefs (2008–2011), Hurricanes (2012–2020, 2022)
Richie McCaw	New Zealand	Crusaders (2001–2015)
Tate McDermott	Australia	Reds (2018–)
Damian McKenzie	New Zealand	Chiefs (2015–2021, 2023–)
Keven Mealamu	New Zealand	Blues (2000–2001, 2003–2015), Chiefs (2002)
Drew Mitchell	Australia	Reds (2004–2005), Force (2006–2009), Waratahs (2010–2013)
Joe Moody	New Zealand	Crusaders (2013–2024)
Stephen Moore	Australia	Reds (2003–2008, 2017), Brumbies (2009–2016)
Stirling Mortlock	Australia	Brumbies (1998–2010), Rebels (2011–2012)
Richie Mo'unga	New Zealand	Crusaders (2016–2023, 2027–)
Tendai Mtawarira	South Africa	Sharks (2007–2019)
Andy Muirhead	Australia	Brumbies (2017–)
Mils Muliaina	New Zealand	Blues (2001–2005), Chiefs (2006–2011, 2014)
Dean Mumm	Australia	Waratahs (2007–2012, 2015–2017)
Lwazi Mvovo	South Africa	Sharks (2010–2020)
Akona Ndungane	South Africa	Bulls (2005–2015)
Odwa Ndungane	South Africa	Bulls (2004), Sharks (2005–2017)
Cadeyrn Neville	Australia	Rebels (2012–2015), Reds (2016–2017, 2027–), Brumbies (2020–2026)
Ma'a Nonu	New Zealand	Hurricanes (2003–2011, 2015), Blues (2012, 2014, 2019), Highlanders (2013)
Trevor Nyakane	South Africa	Cheetahs (2012–2014), Bulls (2015–2020)
James O'Connor	Australia	Force (2008–2011, 2027–), Rebels (2012–2013), Reds (2015, 2020–2024), Crusaders (2025)
Anton Oliver	New Zealand	Highlanders (1996–2007)
Wynand Olivier	South Africa	Bulls (2005–2013)
Coenie Oosthuizen	South Africa	Cheetahs (2010–2015), Sharks (2016–2019)
Wycliff Palu	Australia	Waratahs (2005–2016)
Dalton Papali'i	New Zealand	Blues (2018–2026)
James Parsons	New Zealand	Blues (2012–2020)
Jeremy Paul	Australia	Brumbies (1998–2007)
TJ Perenara	New Zealand	Hurricanes (2012–2020, 2022–2024)
Nick Phipps	Australia	Rebels (2011–2013), Waratahs (2014–2019, 2027–)
JP Pietersen	South Africa	Sharks (2006–2016, 2020)
David Pocock	Australia	Force (2006–2012), Brumbies (2013–2019)
Tatafu Polota-Nau	Australia	Waratahs (2006–2016, 2019), Force (2017)
Joe Powell	Australia	Brumbies (2015–2020), Rebels (2021–2022)
Ian Prior	Zimbabwe	Reds (2011), Brumbies (2012–2013), Force (2014–2017, 2020–2024)
Caleb Ralph	New Zealand	Chiefs (1997), Blues (1998), Crusaders (1999–2008), Reds (2011)
Kieran Read	New Zealand	Crusaders (2007–2019)
Sevu Reece	New Zealand	Crusaders (2019–2026)
Brodie Retallick	New Zealand	Chiefs (2012–2019, 2022–2023)
Ricky Riccitelli	New Zealand	Hurricanes (2016–2021), Blues (2022–2025)
Tom Robertson	Australia	Waratahs (2016–2020), Force (2021–2023, 2025–)
Benn Robinson	Australia	Waratahs (2006–2016)
Luke Romano	New Zealand	Crusaders (2011–2021), Blues (2022)
Aidan Ross	New Zealand; Australia	Chiefs (2016–2025), Reds (2026–)
Danie Rossouw	South Africa	Bulls (2001–2011)
Paddy Ryan	Australia	Waratahs (2011–2018, 2022, 2024)
Pete Samu	Australia	Crusaders (2016–2018), Brumbies (2019–2023), Waratahs (2026–)
Ardie Savea	New Zealand	Hurricanes (2013–2023), Moana Pasifika (2025), Blues (2027–)
Julian Savea	New Zealand	Hurricanes (2011–2018, 2020–2023), Moana Pasifika (2024–2026)
Louis Schreuder	South Africa	Stormers (2011–2016), Southern Kings (2017), Sharks (2018–2020)
Nathan Sharpe	Australia	Reds (1998–2005), Force (2006–2012)
Brad Shields	England	Hurricanes (2012–2018, 2024–)
Rob Simmons	Australia	Reds (2009–2017), Waratahs (2018–2020)
Scott Sio	Australia; Samoa	Brumbies (2012–2022)
John Smit	South Africa	Sharks (1999–2011)
Ben Smith	New Zealand	Highlanders (2009–2019)
Conrad Smith	New Zealand	Hurricanes (2004–2015)
George Smith	Australia	Brumbies (1999–2010, 2013), Reds (2017–2018)
Toby Smith	Australia	Chiefs (2010–2013), Rebels (2014–2017), Hurricanes (2018–2019)
Greg Somerville	New Zealand	Crusaders (1999–2008), Rebels (2011)
Rodney So'oialo	New Zealand	Hurricanes (2001–2011)
Henry Speight	Australia	Brumbies (2011–2019), Reds (2020)
Carlos Spencer	New Zealand	Blues (1996–2005), Lions (2010–2011)
Pierre Spies	South Africa	Bulls (2005–2015)
Scott Staniforth	Australia	Waratahs (1997–2004), Force (2006–2010)
Shaun Stevenson	New Zealand; Samoa	Chiefs (2016–2025)
Hamish Stewart	Australia	Reds (2017–2022), Force (2023–)
Morné Steyn	South Africa	Bulls (2005–2013, 2020)
Adriaan Strauss	South Africa	Bulls (2006, 2015–2018), Cheetahs (2007–2014)
Darcy Swain	Australia	Brumbies (2018–2024), Force (2025–2026)
Steven Sykes	South Africa	Sharks (2007–2012), Southern Kings (2013, 2016), Cheetahs (2015)
Sam Talakai	Australia	Reds (2015–2017), Rebels (2018–2019, 2023–2024)
Jordan Taufua	Samoa	Crusaders (2013–2019)
Samisoni Taukei'aho	New Zealand	Chiefs (2017–)
Codie Taylor	New Zealand	Crusaders (2013–)
Stefan Terblanche	South Africa	Sharks (1998–2003, 2008–2011)
Adam Thomson	New Zealand	Highlanders (2006–2012), Reds (2015), Rebels (2016), Chiefs (2020)
Brad Thorn	New Zealand	Crusaders (2001–2004, 2008–2011), Highlanders (2013–2014)
Reuben Thorne	New Zealand	Crusaders (1997–2008)
Jeremy Thrush	New Zealand	Hurricanes (2006–2015), Force (2020–2023)
Neemia Tialata	New Zealand	Hurricanes (2004–2011)
Matt Todd	New Zealand	Crusaders (2011–2019)
Jeffrey Toomaga-Allen	New Zealand; Samoa	Hurricanes (2012–2019), Reds (2024–2026)
Matt To'omua	Australia	Brumbies (2008–2016), Rebels (2019–2022)
Patrick Tuipulotu	New Zealand	Blues (2014–2021, 2023–)
Taniela Tupou	Australia	Reds (2016–2023), Rebels (2024), Waratahs (2025)
Ofa Tu'ungafasi	New Zealand	Blues (2013–)
Tana Umaga	New Zealand	Hurricanes (1996–2007), Chiefs (2011)
Rob Valetini	Australia	Brumbies (2018–)
Albert van den Berg	South Africa	Cats (1999), Sharks (2000–2008)
AJ Venter	South Africa	Cats (1998–1999), Sharks (2000–2008), Stormers (2009)
Jano Vermaak	South Africa	Lions (2006–2011), Bulls (2012–2013), Stormers (2016–2019)
Duane Vermeulen	South Africa	Cheetahs (2007–2008), Stormers (2009–2015), Bulls (2019–2020)
Victor Vito	New Zealand	Hurricanes (2009–2016)
Pedrie Wannenburg	South Africa	Bulls (2002–2010)
Phil Waugh	Australia	Waratahs (2000–2011)
Brad Weber	New Zealand	Chiefs (2014–2023)
Laurie Weeks	Australia	Reds (2009–2010), Rebels (2011–2017)
Piri Weepu	New Zealand	Hurricanes (2004–2011), Blues (2012–2014)
Michael Wells	Australia	Brumbies (2016), Waratahs (2017–2019), Rebels (2020–2022), Force (2023–2024)
Chris Whitaker	Australia	Waratahs (1997–2006)
Nic White	Australia	Brumbies (2011–2015, 2020–2023), Force (2024–2025)
Luke Whitelock	New Zealand	Crusaders (2012–2015), Highlanders (2016–2019)
Ali Williams	New Zealand	Blues (2002–2007, 2009–2013), Crusaders (2008)
Tony Woodcock	New Zealand	Blues (2002–2012, 2014–2015), Highlanders (2013)
Tom Wright	Australia	Brumbies (2019–)
Sam Wykes	Australia	Force (2008–2015), Sunwolves (2017–2018), Waratahs (2021)
Bill Young	Australia	Brumbies (1998–2006)

- Updated following the conclusion of the 2026 Super Rugby Pacific season.
- Matches include all finals matches and all matches in Super Rugby Aotearoa, Super Rugby AU, Super Rugby Trans-Tasman and Super Rugby Unlocked.
- Players in green were included in 2027 Super Rugby squads.

== See also ==
- Super Rugby
- List of Super Rugby records
