= Palmerston North Intermediate Normal School =

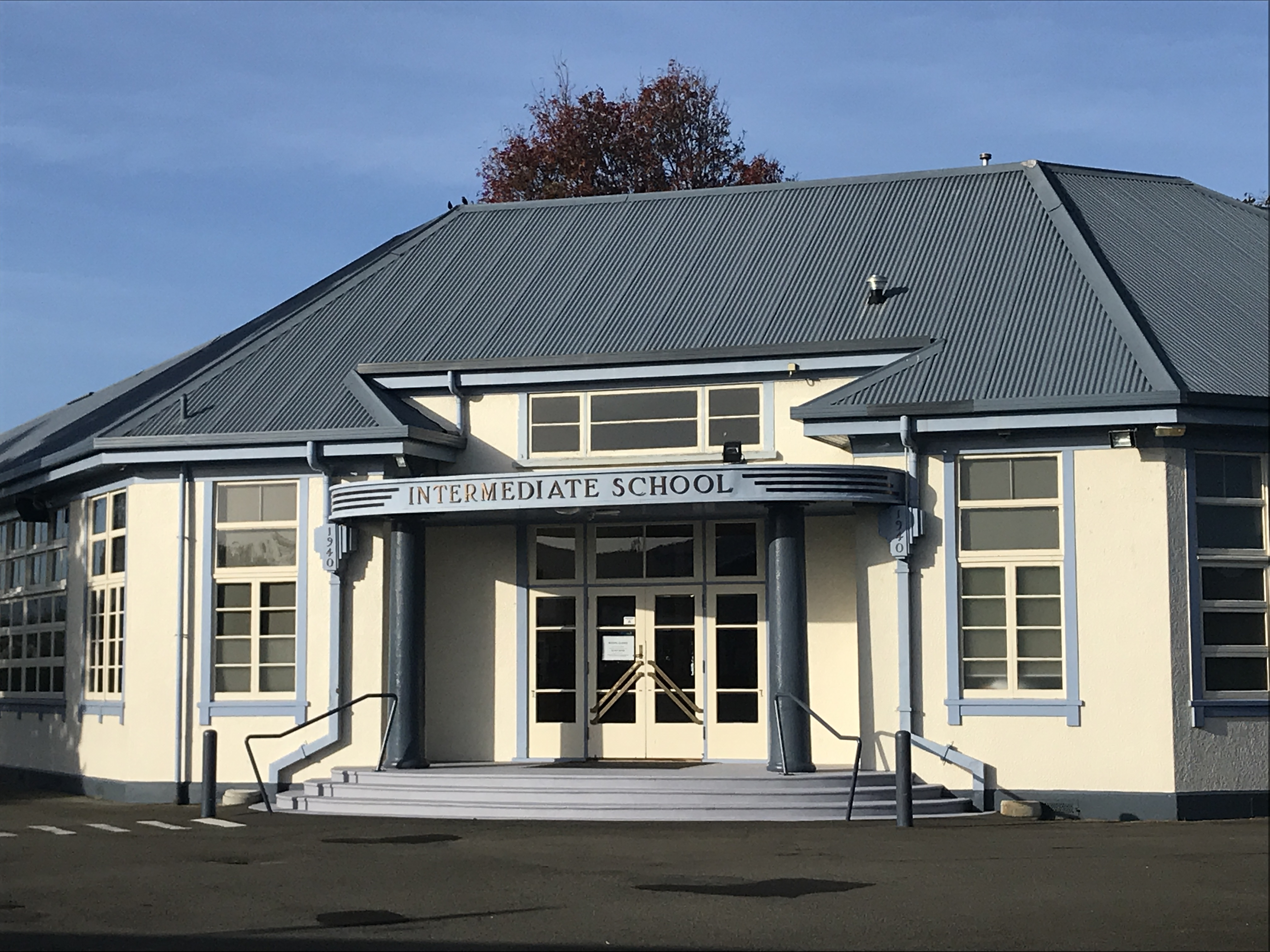

Location
- 56 Linton Street; Palmerston North 4410; New Zealand; 40.3618°S 175.6105°E

Information
- Type: State Co-Ed intermediate, Years 7-8
- Motto: Haere Ake Ra (Onwards and Upwards)
- Established: 1941
- Ministry of Education Institution no.: 2419
- Principal: Hamish Ruawai
- Enrolment: 749 (July 2026)
- Socio-economic decile: 8
- Website: www.pnins.school.nz

Palmerston North Intermediate Normal School (commonly known as PNINS - said PIN-INS) is a state coeducational intermediate school for year seven and year eight, boys and girls located in the central area of Palmerston North, New Zealand.

Students are placed in a composite class on the first day of Year 7 where they will remain for the two years of their time at the school.

== History ==
The school was founded in 1941.

The building was used as a military hospital in World War II for wounded soldiers. And many of the doors in the main building were double hinged to allow stretchers to be transported more easily, most still remain.

== Enrolment ==
As of July 2026, Palmerston North Intermediate Normal School has a roll of 749 students, of which 99 (13.2%) identify as Māori.

As of 2026, the school has an Equity Index of 426, placing it amongst schools whose students have few socioeconomic barriers to achievement (roughly equivalent to decile 8 and 9 under the former socio-economic decile system).

== Sports exchange ==
The school has an annual sports exchange with Hāwera Intermediate school and an annual performing arts exchange with Taradale Intermediate school.

PNINS are also a regular participant at the AIMS Games in Tauranga each year.

== Notable students ==
- Trevor de Cleene (1933–2001), former MP representing Palmerston North
- Kayla Sharland, former Black Sticks captain
- Levi Sherwood, Freestyle motocross rider
- Sam Whitelock, All Black
- Nick Wilson, Men's Black Stick
- Aaron Cruden, All Black
- Luke Whitelock, All Black
- George Whitelock, All Black
- Adam Milne, Black Cap
- Jeremy Corbett Comedian
- Alex Rufer, Wellington Phoenix Football Team
- Jacob Oram, Black Cap
- Emily Naylor, Black Stick
- John Clarke, comedian (also known as Fred Dagg)
- Georgia Barnett, Black Stick
