= Ben Funnell =

New Zealand rugby union player

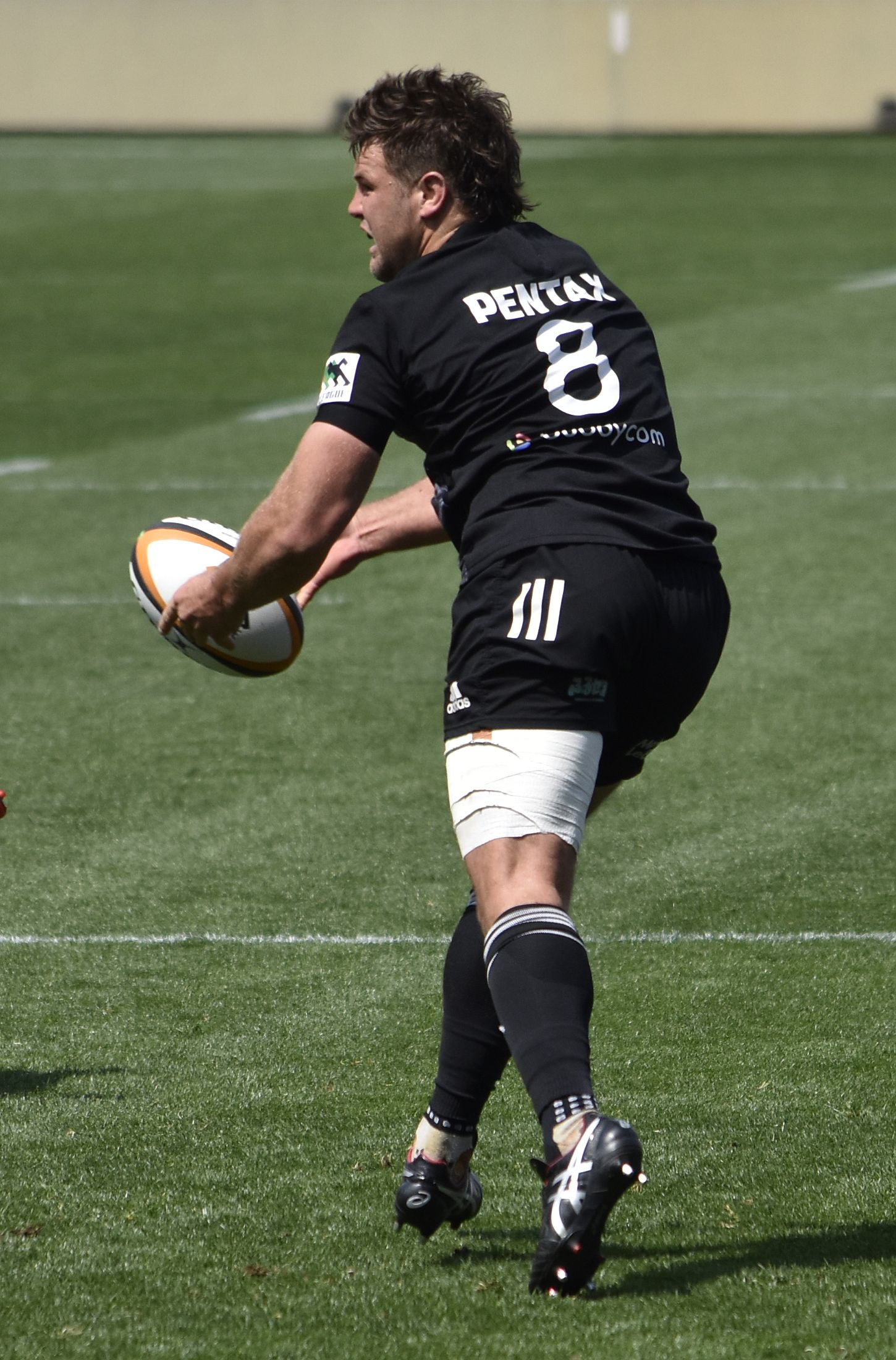
- Funnell on March 27, 2021
- Full name: Benjamin Camden John Funnell
- Born: 6 June 1990 (age 36) Palmerston North, New Zealand
- Height: 180 cm (5 ft 11 in)
- Weight: 109 kg (240 lb; 17 st 2 lb)
- School: Palmerston North Boys' High School
- University: University of Canterbury
- Notable relative(s): Adam Whitelock (cousin); George Whitelock (cousin); Luke Whitelock (cousin); Sam Whitelock (cousin)

Rugby union career
- Position: Hooker
- Current team: Canterbury, Western Force
Senior career
Years	Team	Apps	(Points)
2011–2017, 2022–	Canterbury	100	(85)
2012–2019	Crusaders	92	(40)
2019–2021	Ricoh Black Rams	8	(0)
2024	Western Force	6	(0)
- Correct as of 1 June 2024

Benjamin Camden John Funnell (born 6 June 1990) is a New Zealand rugby union player, who currently plays as a hooker for Canterbury in New Zealand's domestic National Provincial Championship competition and the Western Force in Super Rugby. He previously played for the Crusaders.

== Early career ==
Born in Palmerston North in New Zealand's Manawatū-Whanganui region, Funnell grew up on a dairy farm in the small town of Opiki, 15 km to the south-west of his birthplace. He is a cousin of the Whitelock brothers; George, Adam, Sam and Luke who all went on to play for Canterbury and the Crusaders and attended the same primary school as the boys before attending Palmerston North Boys' High School, where he captained their rugby first XV, while the Whitelocks attended the rival Feilding High School.

While in school, Funnell represented Manawatu at under-18 level before heading south to Christchurch after graduation to study accounting at university. He joined the High School Old Boys side which compete in the local Canterbury club rugby competition and also made his way through the Canterbury youth structures, turning out for both their Academy and Colts sides as well as the Crusaders Knights development team.

== Senior career ==
Funnell first made the Canterbury squad for the 2011 ITM Cup and immediately made a big impression. Taking advantage of an injury to Steve Fualau, he made his national provincial championship debut as a replacement for Paul Ngauamo in the first match of the season against Auckland and went on to play 7 times during his first year at provincial level, lifting the Premiership trophy for the first time as Canterbury overcame Waikato 12–3 in the final.

He was again an ITM Cup winner in 2012 and also established himself as the province's first choice in the number 2 jersey, playing 9 times as Canterbury this time downed Auckland in the final. It was 3 titles in 3 years in 2013 with Funnell appearing in all 12 of Canterbury's games and also contributing 1 try as they finished the year with a comprehensive 29–13 victory away to Wellington.

2014 was more of a struggle both for Canterbury, who were knocked out of the ITM Cup by local rivals Tasman at the semi-final stage and for Funnell who despite playing 10 times faced stiff competition for a starting spot from future All Black Codie Taylor. However, 2015 ITM Cup saw Funnell re-establish himself as first-choice hooker, playing all 12 games, including 10 starts as Canterbury reclaimed their Premiership title by defeating Auckland 25–23 in the final while Taylor's elevation to the All Blacks squad in 2016 left Funnell as the undisputed holder of the number 2 shirt and he once again played every game during the season as the men from Christchurch were crowned champions of New Zealand for the 8th time in 9 years.

== Super Rugby ==
An impressive debut season for Canterbury in 2011 saw Funnell elevated to the Crusaders squad for the 2012 Super Rugby season. Aged just 21, he had to be content serving as back up to the more experienced Corey Flynn and Quentin MacDonald and made just a solitary appearance, as a replacement in a match against the Waratahs in Sydney during his first season with the 'Saders. MacDonald's departure for the Blues in 2013 saw Funnell promoted to second choice hooker behind Flynn and he played 15 times including 3 starts as the Crusaders lost to the Chiefs, 20–19, in the semi-finals.

With Flynn reaching the veteran stage of his career in 2014, Funnell began to be groomed to take over the starting duties from him, with the duo rotating and Flynn starting 10 games to Funnell's 8 as the Crusaders narrowly lost to the Waratahs in the final of the competition. Flynn's departure for Toulouse at the end of 2014 left Funnell as first choice hooker for the 2015 season with Codie Taylor and Ged Robinson serving as his back ups. Funnell played in all 16 games of a disappointing season for the Crusaders, starting 10 games to Taylor's 6 as the men from Christchurch finished in 7th place on the final log, just outside of the play-off spots.

2016 saw the Crusaders return to the Super Rugby play-offs, finishing 7th once again on the overall log, however due to competition restructuring, this was enough to see them advance to the quarter finals where they went down 42–25 to the Lions in Johannesburg. The season was a struggle for Funnell as he lost his starting spot to Taylor and had to make do with just 1 start in 9 appearances.

After a stint in the Japanese Top League competition with Ricoh Black Rams (2019–2021), Funnell returned to Super Rugby in 2024. On 6 February 2024, the Force announced that the franchise had signed Funnell for the 2024 Super Rugby Pacific season.

== International career ==
Funnell was a New Zealand Schools representative in 2008.

== Career honours ==
Canterbury

- National Provincial Championship – 2011, 2012, 2013, 2015, 2016, 2017

== Super Rugby statistics ==
As of 1 January 2017

Season	Team	Games	Starts	Sub	Mins	Tries	Cons	Pens	Drops	Points	Yel	Red
2012	Crusaders	1	0	1	11	0	0	0	0	0	0	0
2013	Crusaders	15	3	12	475	0	0	0	0	0	0	0
2014	Crusaders	17	8	9	664	1	0	0	0	5	0	0
2015	Crusaders	16	10	6	722	1	0	0	0	5	0	0
2016	Crusaders	8	1	8	227	1	0	0	0	5	0	0
Total		58	22	36	2099	3	0	0	0	15	0	0
