= Adam Whitelock =

New Zealand rugby union player

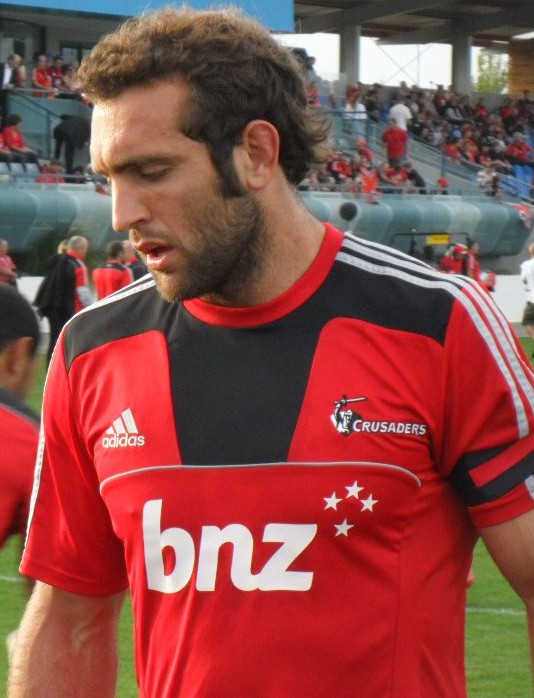
- Born: 17 April 1987 (age 39) Palmerston North, Manawatū-Whanganui, New Zealand
- Height: 1.90 m (6 ft 3 in)
- Weight: 103 kg (16 st 3 lb)
- School: Palmerston North Intermediate Normal School; Feilding High School
- University: University of Canterbury
- Notable relative(s): George Whitelock (brother), Luke Whitelock (brother), Sam Whitelock (brother), Ben Funnell (cousin), Nelson Dalzell (grandfather)

Rugby union career
- Position: Midfield Back / Wing
Senior career
Years	Team	Apps	(Points)
2014–2017	Bayonne	16	(1)
- Correct as of 13 June 2018
Provincial / State sides
Years	Team	Apps	(Points)
2008–14	Canterbury	56	(80)
- Correct as of 13 June 2018
Super Rugby
Years	Team	Apps	(Points)
2009–14	Crusaders	55	(35)
- Correct as of 13 June 2018
National sevens team
Years	Team		Comps
2014	New Zealand		2 (20)

Adam Whitelock (born 17 April 1987) is a former New Zealand rugby union player who played as a midfield back or wing. He previously played for the Crusaders in Super Rugby, Canterbury in the ITM Cup. and Bayonne in the Top 14. Whitelock also played for the All Blacks Sevens team.

== Biography ==
Adam is the son of a former Junior All Black, Braeden Whitelock, and the grandson of All Black Nelson Dalzell. He has three brothers All Blacks George Whitelock, Sam Whitelock and Luke Whitelock. Despite never playing for the All Blacks Adam was the only brother to play for the All Blacks Sevens team. Notably he was also the only brother to play in the backs.

All four of the Whitelock boys were educated in Fielding and played their junior rugby for Palmerston North High School Old Boys' Rugby Football Club. In his early days Adam was identified as a talented middle-distance runner.

Adam was the first of the brothers to move to Christchurch, moving to study accounting at the University of Canterbury in 2006.

Former Crusaders coach Todd Blackadder commenting on Whitelock's well renowned professionalism and work ethic stated that "Adam is one of the hardest workers in this team. He is consistently the fittest member of the squad but still strives to become better every year."

== Career ==
=== Provincial ===
Whitelock debuted for the Canterbury team in 2008 as a 22 year old against Wellington. He would go onto play 56 games for Canterbury playing a staple role in the team. Despite being in the reserves in the final of the 2008 Air New Zealand Cup (now Mitre 10 Cup), Whitelock and the Canterbury team would go on to win the title for the next 5 years setting a new precedent in NPC history.

=== Super Rugby ===
Whitelock made his Crusaders debut against the Brumbies in 2009. His first try for the Crusaders was a crucial try from a brilliant pass from Leon MacDonald which led to the Crusaders overcoming the Stormers 11-7.

In a remarkable occasion in professional sport teams all four Whitelock brothers played together for the first time in a competitive match in March 2013 (vs. Bulls). Other than a preseason match at the beginning of the previous season this was the first time playing together since playing for Feilding High School in 2003. The brothers would play a further 17 games together at their time with the Crusaders.

=== All Blacks Sevens ===
In 2014 Whitelock was called into the All Blacks Sevens after receiving high praise in regards to his fitness from coach Sir Gordon Tietjens.

=== Overseas ===
Whitelock announced in 2014 that he was leaving New Zealand to take up a contract in France with Aviron Bayonnais.
