= Nelson Dalzell =

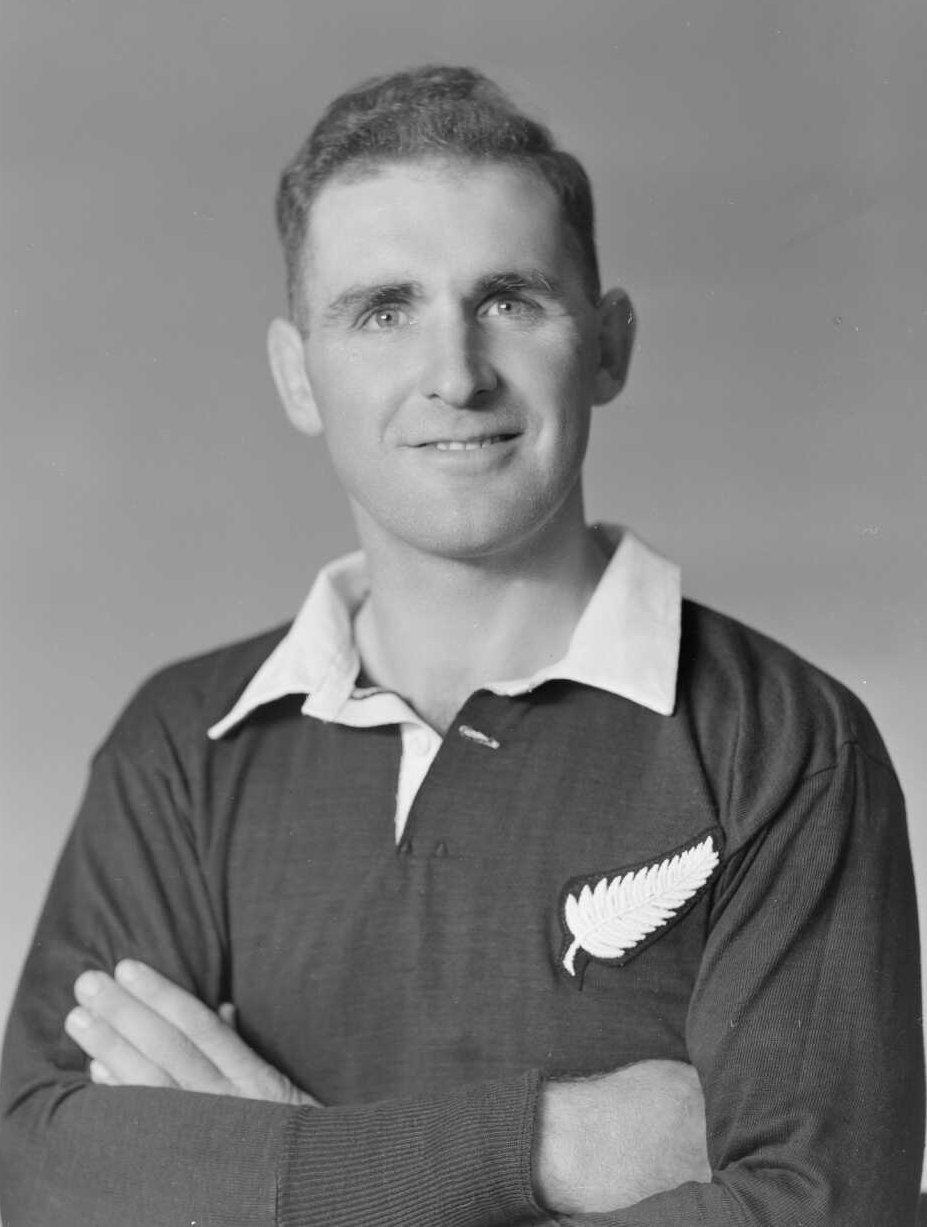
- Dalzell c. 1953
- Born: George Nelson Dalzell; 26 April 1921 Rotherham, New Zealand
- Died: 30 April 1989 (aged 68) Christchurch, New Zealand
- Height: 1.88 m (6 ft 2 in)
- Weight: 102 kg (225 lb)
- School: Culverden School
- Notable relative(s): Allan Elsom (brother-in-law); Graeme Higginson (son-in-law); George Whitelock (grandson); Sam Whitelock (grandson); Luke Whitelock (grandson); Adam Whitelock (grandson); Hamish Dalzell (grandson)
- Occupation(s): Harness racing trainer and breeder

Rugby union career
- Position: Lock
Provincial / State sides
Years	Team	Apps	(Points)
1948–1954	Canterbury	56	
International career
Years	Team	Apps	(Points)
1953–1954	New Zealand	5	(3)

George Nelson Dalzell (26 April 1921 – 30 April 1989) was a New Zealand rugby union player. A lock, Dalzell represented Canterbury at a provincial level, and was a member of the New Zealand national side, the All Blacks, from 1953 to 1954. He played 22 matches for the All Blacks including five internationals.
