= Alfriston College =

Alfriston College / Te Pae o Takaanini

Location
- 550 Porchester Road, Manurewa, Auckland; 37.0185°S 174.9178°E

Information
- Type: State co-ed secondary (year 9–13)
- Motto: Zest for Learning / Te Ihi ki Te Ako
- Established: 2004
- Ministry of Education Institution no.: 6929
- Principal: Kylie Jeffries
- Enrolment: 1,273 (July 2026)
- Socio-economic decile: 2E
- Website: alfristoncollege.school.nz

Alfriston College is a secondary school in the suburb of Alfriston in Auckland, New Zealand.

The college opened in 2004, and along with Botany Downs Secondary College, was the first state secondary school to be built in Auckland in 25 years (the last was Macleans College in 1980). It opened with year 9 students and expanded to cover more senior classes each year as the original students aged. From 2008, all secondary years (9–13) have been taught.

== Enrolment ==
As of July 2026, Alfriston College has a roll of 1,273 students, of which 369 (29.0%) identify as Māori.

As of 2026, the school has an Equity Index of 496, placing it amongst schools whose students have many socioeconomic barriers to achievement (roughly equivalent to deciles 2 and 3 under the former socio-economic decile system).

== Notable alumni ==
- Jordan Taufua – rugby union player

== Kaupapa Māori ==
Alfriston College has a strong connection to kaupapa Māori. The school's whare is called Te Pae o Takaanini.

Alfriston College is also home to Te Kahikatoa, the school's kapa haka. In 2023, Te Kahikatoa won Division 3 of the Māori stage at Polyfest. They performed at the 2024 Kapa Haka Nationals.

Alfriston College is also one of the best schools in New Zealand for Mau Rakau.
