= Georgia Barnett =

New Zealand field hockey player

Personal information
- Born: 27 August 1994 (age 32) Palmerston North, New Zealand
- Height: 1.64 m (5 ft 5 in)

Sport
- Sport: Field hockey
- Position: Goalkeeper
- Club: Central Mysticks
Senior career
Years	Team	Caps	Goals
2015–	Central Mysticks	-	-
National team
Years	Team	Caps	Goals
2015–	New Zealand	29(?)	-
- Updated on 9 June 2016

Georgia Barnett (born 27 August 1994) is a New Zealand field hockey player. A goalkeeper, she represents the Central Mysticks in the New Zealand National Hockey League.

She currently plays for the New Zealand women's national field hockey team. With the national youth team she won the bronze medal at the 2010 Summer Youth Olympics. Barnett's coaching career began in 2019 when she coached the Central U18 women's team to gold at the national tournament.

== Life ==
Barnett was educated at Palmerston North Intermediate Normal School then Palmerston North Girls' High School. She completed her Massey University business studies degree in Palmerston North.

== Awards ==
In 2015, she became Manawatu Sportswoman of the Year.
