= Graeme Higginson =

NZ international rugby union player

- Born: 14 December 1954 (age 71) Rangiora, New Zealand
- Height: 1.93 m (6 ft 4 in)
- Weight: 105 kg (231 lb)
- School: Rangiora High School
- Notable relative: Nelson Dalzell (father-in-law)
- Occupation: Farmer

Rugby union career
- Position: Lock
Provincial / State sides
| Years | Team | Apps | (Points) |
| 1976–81 | Canterbury | 63 | |
| 1982–88 | Hawke's Bay | 31 | |
International career
| Years | Team | Apps | (Points) |
| 1980–83 | New Zealand | 6 | (0) |

Graeme Higginson (born 14 December 1954) is a New Zealand former rugby union player. A lock, Higginson represented Canterbury and Hawke's Bay at a provincial level, and was a member of the New Zealand national side, the All Blacks, from 1980 to 1983. He played 20 matches for the All Blacks including six internationals. He captained the All Blacks in one match, against Australian Universities in 1980.
