= Jordan Taufua =

NZ rugby union player (born 1992)

- Full name: Sa Jordan Taufua
- Born: 29 January 1992 (age 34) Auckland, New Zealand
- Height: 1.85 m (6 ft 1 in)
- Weight: 115 kg (254 lb; 18 st 2 lb)
- School: Alfriston College; Sacred Heart College
- University: Lincoln University

Rugby union career
- Position(s): Flanker, Number 8
- Current team: Lyon
Senior career
Years	Team	Apps	(Points)
2012–2013	Canterbury	14	(10)
2012	Tasman	10	(5)
2013–2018	Crusaders	101	(70)
2014–2016	Counties Manukau	30	(60)
2017–2019	Tasman	20	(15)
2019–2021	Leicester Tigers	18	(15)
2021–	Lyon	43	(40)
- Correct as of 28 August 2023
International career
Years	Team	Apps	(Points)
2011	Samoa U20	4	(10)
2012	New Zealand U20	5	(5)
2022–	Samoa	6	(0)
- Correct as of 28 August 2023

Sa Jordan Taufua (born 29 January 1992) is a professional rugby union player who plays as a flanker for Top 14 club Lyon. Born in New Zealand, he represents Samoa at international level for which he qualifies on ancestry grounds.

== Early life ==
Born in Otahuhu, in the Auckland suburbs, Taufua was educated at Alfriston College before completing his schooling at Sacred Heart College in the city of Auckland. After finishing high school, he moved south to Christchurch to attend Lincoln University and, while there, he played local club rugby for them.

== Senior career ==
Taufua's senior rugby career began in 2012 when he was loaned to the Tasman Mako by Canterbury before the season's commencement. He displayed fine form in his first year of provincial rugby, playing all 10 of the Mako regular season championship games before being controversially recalled by Canterbury ahead of the competition's play-off phase. Taufua played as a replacement in Canterbury's victories over Taranaki and Auckland, which saw them crowned ITM Cup Premiership champions, while things didn't work out quite as well for Tasman who went down to Otago in their Championship play-off semi-final match.

A full Canterbury squad member in 2013, he was an ever-present as the men from Christchurch retained their ITM Cup Premiership crown, finishing second in the round-robin stage and going on to defeat Wellington 29–13 in the final.

He moved back north in 2014 to play for the Pukekohe-based Counties Manukau Steelers and started every game in his first season for them as they finished in 5th place on the Premiership log, just outside the play-off places. The Steelers were once again agonisingly close to making the play-offs in 2015, but ended up in 5th spot once more with Taufua contributing 3 tries in 9 matches. He bagged a career-high 6 tries in one season as he was again an ever-present in the Counties side that finally did make the Mitre 10 Cup play-offs in 2016, before going down to his former side and eventual champions, Canterbury.

After a four-year absence, Jordan Taufua returned to the Tasman Mako in 2017. The Mako went on to reach the Premiership Final that season, which they lost to Canterbury.

An excellent debut season for Tasman and Canterbury in provincial rugby brought him to the attention of Christchurch-based Super Rugby franchise the Crusaders, who named him in their squad for the 2013 Super Rugby season. Aged just 21 and surrounded by experienced loose forwards such as Richie McCaw, Kieran Read, Matt Todd as well as George and Luke Whitelock it was largely a season of learning for the young Taufua, who made just 5 substitute appearances throughout the year. A season spent learning from experienced pros proved to be beneficial to him as he became much more of a regular the following year, playing 14 times as the 'Saders finished as the competition's runner-up, losing narrowly 33–32 to the Waratahs in the final in Sydney.

He was firmly established as a starting member in the Crusaders line up in 2015, playing in all 16 of their games during a season that ended with them in a disappointing 7th place in the overall standings, just outside the play-off positions. They bounced back in 2016 and reached the quarter-finals before bowing out with a 42–25 loss to the Lions in Johannesburg. Taufua played in 15 of their 16 games and helped himself to an impressive 4 tries that season.

In May 2016, it was announced that Taufua had extended his contract with the Crusaders and would stay with them until at least the end of the 2018 Super Rugby season. Taufua re-signed with the Crusaders for one more season (2019) in March 2018.

After joining Premiership Rugby side Leicester Tigers for the 2019–20 season, he was granted an early release in February 2021.

On 27 January 2021, French club Lyon announced that it had signed Taufua as an injury replacement for the remainder of the 2020-21 Top 14 season for the injured Mathieu Bastareaud and Gillian Galan. Taufua made his Lyon and Top 14 debut on 5 February 2021 against Clermont.

== International career ==
Although born in New Zealand, Taufua opted to represent the land of his ancestors, Samoa, at the 2011 IRB Junior World Championship in Italy before switching his allegiance back to New Zealand in 2012, playing 5 times for them in their run to the tournament final where they went down 22–16 to hosts South Africa in Cape Town.

In June 2015, Taufua was part of a World XV side which lost 46–10 to South Africa in Cape Town, he played the whole game in the number 6 shirt. The following year at Wembley Stadium, on 5 November 2016, he faced the same opposition, but this time in a Barbarians jersey. He was selected as the starting openside flanker in a game that ended up as a 31–31 draw and was replaced by Ruan Ackermann in the 75th minute of the match.
