= Sam Wykes =

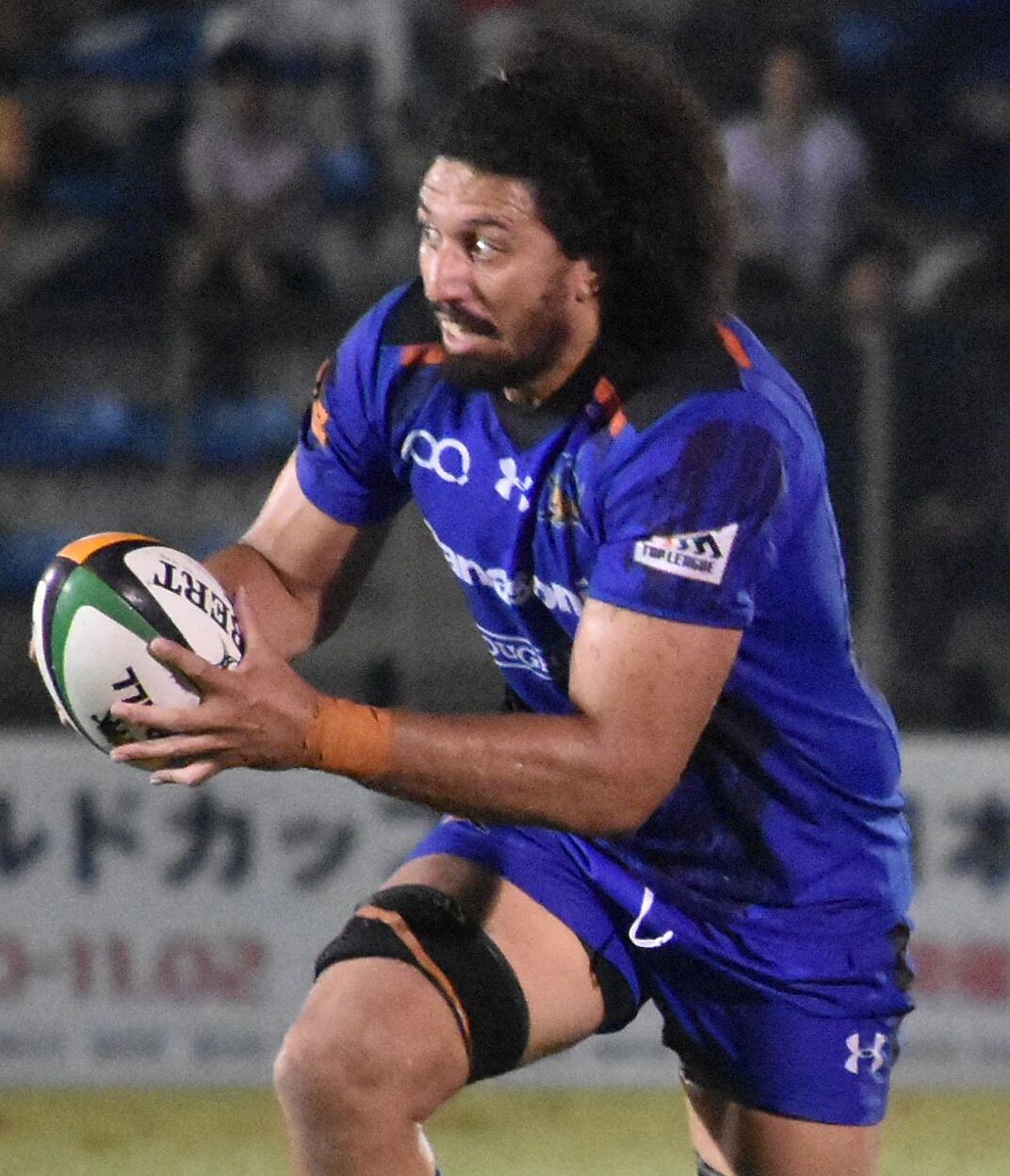
- Wykes with the Wild Knights in 2018
- Born: Samuel Wykes; 25 April 1988 (age 38) Sydney, New South Wales, Australia
- Height: 1.97 m (6 ft 6 in)
- Weight: 109 kg (17 st 2 lb)
- School: Patrician Brothers' College, Blacktown

Rugby union career
- Position: Lock
Senior career
Years	Team	Apps	(Points)
2007	Western Sydney Rams	1	(0)
2008–2015	Force	87	(15)
2014	Perth Spirit	5	(5)
2015–2017	Coca-Cola Red Sparks	19	(25)
2017–2018	Sunwolves	20	(15)
2017–2019	Panasonic Wild Knights	19	(15)
2019–2020	Shimizu Blue Sharks	4	(0)
2021	Waratahs	2	(0)
- Correct as of 20 August 2021
International career
Years	Team	Apps	(Points)
2005	Australian Schoolboys	3	(0)
- Correct as of 16 June 2026

Samuel Wykes (born 25 April 1988) is an Australian radio broadcaster and podcaster for the Australian Broadcasting Corporation (ABC) and former professional rugby union player. His regular playing position was lock. Across his 14 year career, Wykes played for multiple teams in the Super Rugby, and Japanese Top League competitions, becoming a centurion in the former and accruing over 150 combined appearances.

== Early life ==
Wykes was born in Sydney, Australia in 1988. His mother is Tongan, hailing from the village of Muʻa on the country's main island of Tongatapu. Wykes was educated at Patrician Brothers' College, Blacktown, in Sydney's western suburbs where he eventually became an Australian Schoolboys representative in his youth.

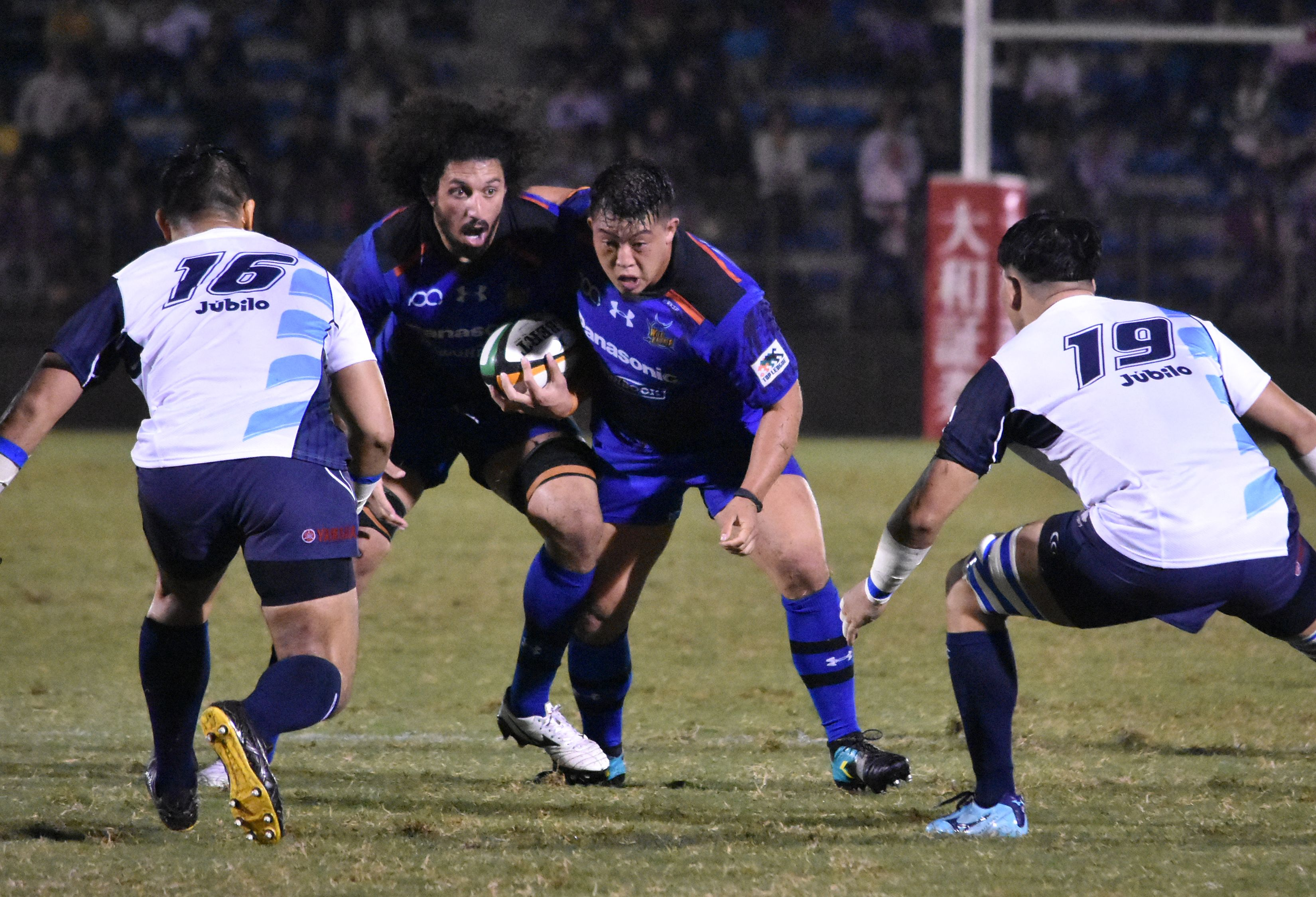
Wykes with the Wild Knights in the Japanese Top League in 2018.

== Super Rugby statistics ==
As of 20 August 2021.

Season	Team	Games	Starts	Sub	Mins	Tries	Cons	Pens	Drops	Points	Yel	Red
2008	Force	9	1	8	188	0	0	0	0	0	0	0
2009	Force	6	4	2	246	0	0	0	0	0	0	0
2010	Force	10	6	4	433	0	0	0	0	0	0	0
2011	Force	16	14	2	1056	2	0	0	0	10	0	0
2012	Force	3	2	1	111	0	0	0	0	0	0	0
2013	Force	15	11	4	845	0	0	0	0	0	0	0
2014	Force	15	15	0	1028	0	0	0	0	0	1	0
2015	Force	13	11	2	850	1	0	0	0	5	0	0
2017	Sunwolves	13	11	2	841	2	0	0	0	10	1	0
2018	Sunwolves	7	5	2	343	1	0	0	0	5	0	0
2021	Waratahs	2	1	1	53	0	0	0	0	0	0	0
Total		107	80	27	5,941	6	0	0	0	30	2	0
