= Allan Elsom =

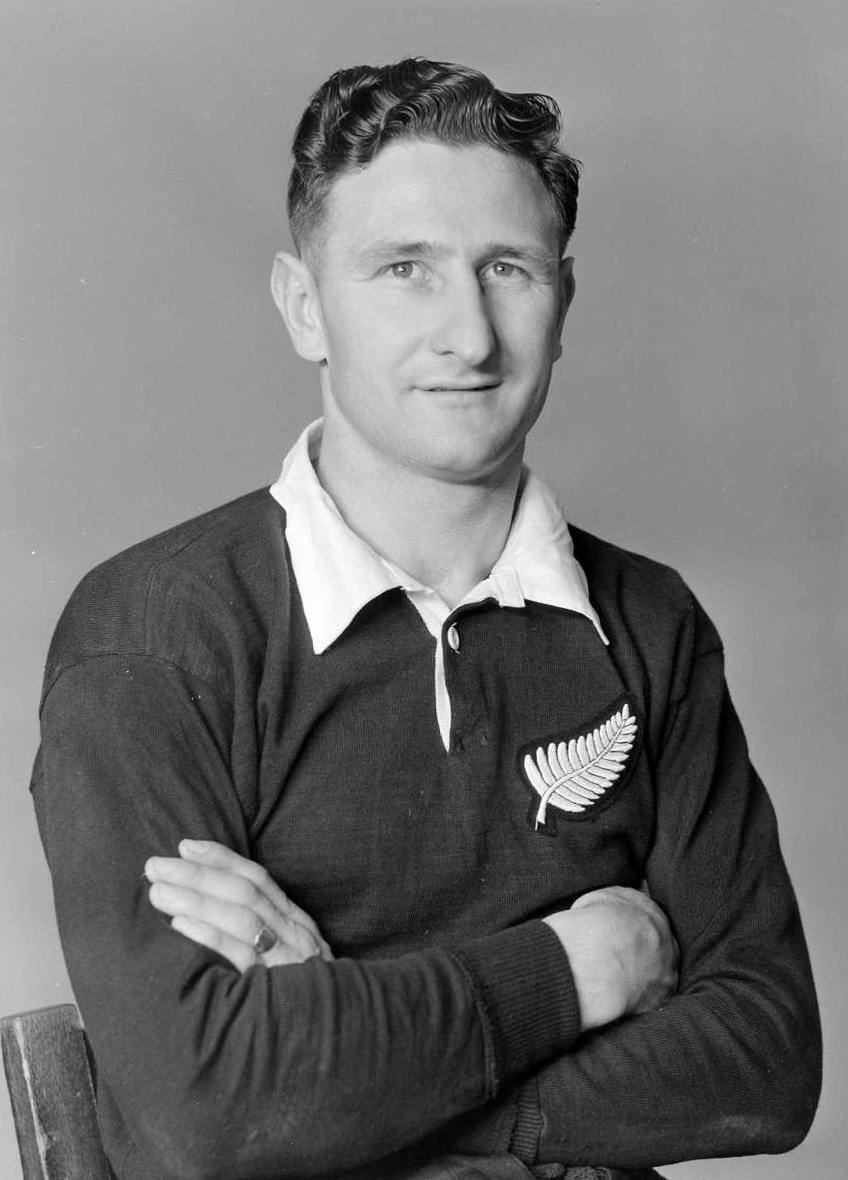
- Elsom, c. 1952
- Born: Allan Edwin George Elsom; 18 July 1925 Christchurch, New Zealand
- Died: 25 September 2010 (aged 85) Christchurch, New Zealand
- Height: 1.83 m (6 ft 0 in)
- Weight: 77 kg (170 lb)
- School: Christchurch Boys' High School
- Notable relative: Nelson Dalzell (brother-in-law)
- Occupation: Real estate agent

Rugby union career
- Position: Three-quarter
Provincial / State sides
Years	Team	Apps	(Points)
1951–1958	Canterbury		
International career
Years	Team	Apps	(Points)
1952–1955	New Zealand	6	(3)

Allan Edwin George Elsom (18 July 1925 – 25 September 2010) was a New Zealand rugby union player. A three-quarter, Elsom represented Canterbury at a provincial level, and was a member of the New Zealand national side, the All Blacks, from 1952 to 1955. He played 22 matches for the All Blacks including six internationals.
