= Feilding High School =

High School in Feilding, North Island, New Zealand

Location
- Churcher Street, Feilding, Manawatu; 40.2143°S 175.5727°E

Information
- Former names: Feilding Technical High School Feilding Agricultural High School
- Type: State Co-Ed Secondary School (Year 9–13) with boarding facilities
- Motto: Māori: Kia Toa Kia Ngākaunui "Have Courage, Desire Greatly"
- Established: 1921 as Feilding Technical High School
- Ministry of Education Institution no.: 197
- Principal: Nathan Stewart
- Enrolment: 1,682 (July 2026)
- Houses: Kairanga, Kiwitea, Manawatū, Ōroua, Pōhāngina, Rangitīkei, Ruahine, Tararua
- Socio-economic decile: 5M
- Yearbook: Sheaf
- Website: www.feildinghigh.school.nz

Feilding High School is a co-ed Secondary School (Year 9–13) in Feilding, New Zealand. It is the only secondary school in the town of Feilding.

== History ==
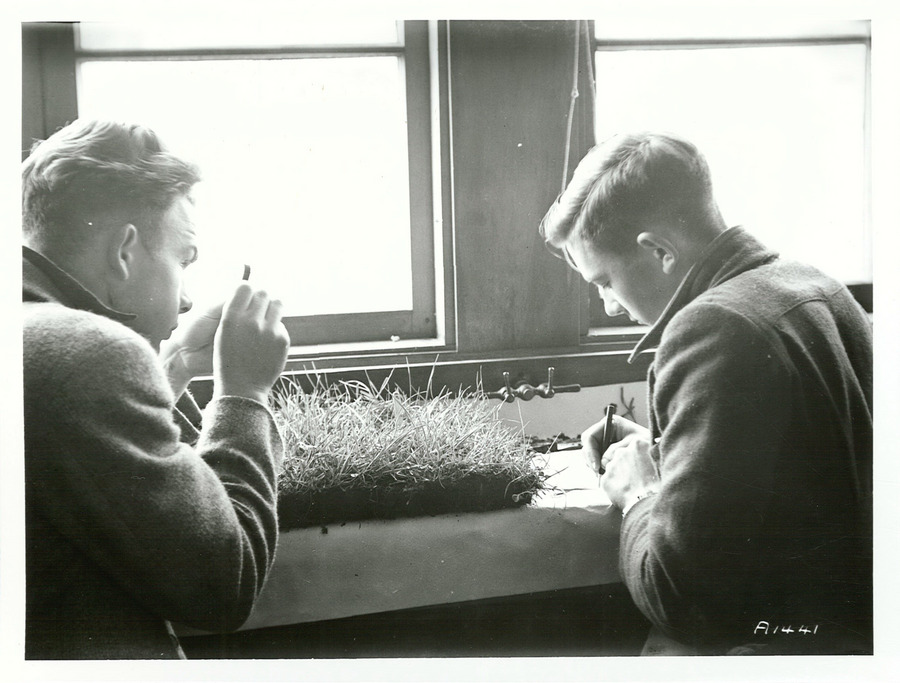
Pupils at the Feilding Agricultural High School

The school was originally named the Feilding Technical High School and subsequently became known as the Feilding Agricultural High School (FAHS). The school's foundation stone was laid on 7 February 1921 by the then Minister for Education the Honourable James Parr. In 2000 the school had its name changed to FAHS Feilding High School.

In 2015 Feilding High School was rated as having at Decile 5 socio-economic rating. In 2018 Nathan Stewart was appointed as principal of the school.

=== Principals ===
The school has had nine principals since 1921:

| Period | Principal |
|---|---|
| 1921–1946 | L. J. Wild |
| 1947–1960 | K. E. McKinnion |
| 1961–1967 | W. L. McLean |
| 1968–1974 | H. Prosser |
| 1975–1990 | B. H. Kerr |
| 1990–1996 | B. L. Jackson |
| 1997–2015 | R. S. Menzies |
| 2016–2018 | M. O'Grady |
| 2018–present | N. Stewart |

== Logo ==
Feilding High School's logo was gifted by Sir Peter Buck (Te Rangi Hīroa) in 1922. It also features on the crest of Manawatu District Council.

== Enrolment ==
As of July 2026, Feilding High School has a roll of 1,682 students, of which 445 (26.5%) identify as Māori.

As of 2026, the school has an Equity Index of 472, placing it amongst schools whose students have above average socioeconomic barriers to achievement (roughly equivalent to deciles 4 and 5 under the former socio-economic decile system).

== Notable alumni ==
- Bob Bell (1929–2011), former National Party MP
- Mihingarangi Forbes, television journalist
- Ted Thomas (judge), Former judge of the Court of Appeal

=== Rugby players ===
- Nelson Ball: All Black (1931–36), Wanganui and Wellington representative
- Amy Cokayne: England Women's Rugby, and Harlequins Women
- Mitchell Crosswell: Māori All Blacks, Chiefs, Manawatu, Taranaki and East Coast representative
- Nick Crosswell: Māori All Blacks, Chiefs, Highlanders, Hurricanes, Manawatu and Dragons RFC representative
- Jack Finlay: All Black (1946) and Manawatu representative
- Stu Freebairn: All Black (1953–54) and Manawatu representative
- Kevin Eveleigh: All Black (1974–77) and Manawatu representative – Captain Ranfurly Sheild.
- Perry Harris: All Black (1976) and Manawatu representative
- Sarah Goss: Black Fern, NZ Women's Sevens, Manawatu Cyclones XV and 7s representative
- Vilimoni Koroi: New Zealand national rugby sevens team, New Zealand national under-20 rugby union team, Highlanders and Otago representative
- Semisi Masirewa: Western Force, Sunwolves, Waikato and Manawatu representative
- Aaron Smith: All Black (2012–23), Highlanders and Manawatu Turbos representative
- Codie Taylor: All Black, Maori All Black, Crusaders and Canterbury representative
- Tiny White: All Black (1946–57) and Poverty Bay representative
- Adam Whitelock: Crusaders and Canterbury representative
- George Whitelock: All Black (2009), Crusaders and Canterbury representative
- Luke Whitelock: All Black (2013–18), Crusaders and Canterbury representative
- Sam Whitelock: All Black (2010–23), Crusaders, and Canterbury representative

== See also ==
- List of schools in New Zealand
