= Sam Whitelock =

New Zealand rugby union footballer

Sam Whitelock ONZM
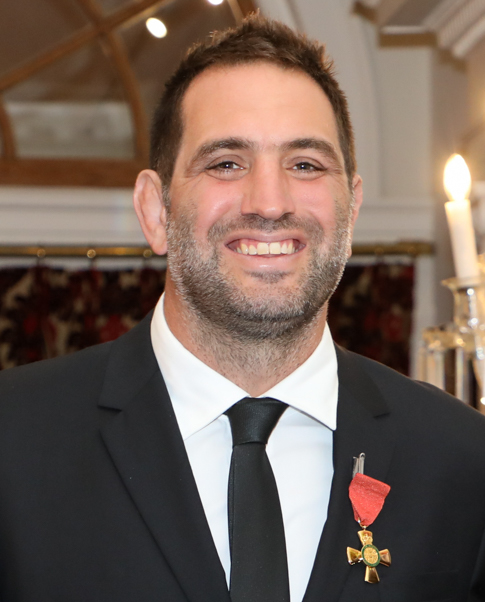
- Whitelock in 2025
- Full name: Samuel Lawrence Whitelock
- Born: 12 October 1988 (age 38) Palmerston North, New Zealand
- Height: 2.02 m (6 ft 8 in)
- Weight: 120 kg (265 lb; 18 st 13 lb)
- School: Feilding High School
- Notable relative(s): Ben Funnell (cousin); Adam Whitelock (brother); George Whitelock (brother); Luke Whitelock (brother)

Rugby union career
- Position: Lock
Senior career
Years	Team	Apps	(Points)
2008–2023	Canterbury	22	(15)
2010–2023	Crusaders	180	(45)
2020	Panasonic Wild Knights	5	(0)
2024	Pau	13	(10)
- Correct as of 9 June 2024
International career
Years	Team	Apps	(Points)
2007	New Zealand U19	4	(0)
2008	New Zealand U20	5	(5)
2010–2023	New Zealand	153	(35)
- Correct as of 28 October 2023
Medal record
Men's Rugby union
Representing New Zealand
Rugby World Cup
Gold medal – first place	2011 New Zealand	Squad
Gold medal – first place	2015 England	Squad
Bronze medal – third place	2019 Japan	Squad
Silver medal – second place	2023 France	Squad

Samuel Lawrence Whitelock ONZM (born 12 October 1988) is a New Zealand former rugby union player.

Whitelock played 153 tests for New Zealand between 2010 and 2023, and is the youngest New Zealander to reach 100 tests. He is the fastest player ever to reach 100 international appearances, achieving the feat eight years and two months after his test debut.

Whitelock was the winner of New Zealand Rugby Player of the Year in 2017. He formed a renowned locking combination with Brodie Retallick; Whitelock and Retallick played 50 tests together. He was a key member of the 2011 and 2015 Rugby World Cup-winning teams, becoming one of only 43 players who have won the men's Rugby World Cup more than once.

Whitelock played for Canterbury, the Crusaders, Japanese club Panasonic Wild Knights, and retired from rugby after playing for French club Pau in 2024.

== Playing career ==
=== Early career ===
Whitelock was part of the world championship winning team, the Baby All Blacks, at the 2008 IRB Junior World Championship playing at half back He played 5 games, scoring a try against Argentina. Whitelock made his Air New Zealand Cup debut for Canterbury in 2008 against Wellington. His Super Rugby debut for the Crusaders was against the Highlanders in the 2010 Super 14 season.

In 2010 he was selected into the All Blacks team for the 2010 mid-year rugby test series. He made his debut replacing Brad Thorn off the bench, against Ireland, and scored 2 tries. Whitelock played ten tests in 2010 and has never missed a team naming for the team since his debut, earning two starts on the end of year tour. The first of which was a 26–16 win over England where he was replaced by Anthony Boric in the 66th minute and the second of which was a start against Scotland in a 49–3 win where he played for the full 80 minutes. Whitelock scored his third test try the following week in a 38-18 win over Ireland.

=== 2011–2015 ===
After five appearances prior to the World Cup in 2011, he was selected into New Zealand's 30-man World Cup Squad and after starting in the second pool game against Japan which was an 83–7 win for New Zealand, he went on to hold this position for the rest of the World Cup, including the All Blacks' 8–7 win over France at Eden Park on 23 October, which saw them win the 2011 Rugby World Cup.

Whitelock cemented his place as a regular starter for the All Blacks in 2012 and started in 13 of their 14 tests, only coming on as a replacement against Italy in Rome during a 42–10 win that year. Whitelock scored the fourth try of his test career in the 32-16 win over South Africa in the Rugby Championship, scoring the opening try for the All Blacks 25 minutes into the test.

After re-committing to New Zealand Rugby for another four years in 2013, Whitelock and Brodie Retallick became a World-Class locking combination and started together eight times in 2013, with Whitelock playing in 12 of the All Blacks' 14 tests in 2013. Whitelock was only subbed off twice the All Blacks' unbeaten year, in tests against France, Australia and Argentina. He also played his 50th test in the 30–22 win over England on the 2013 end-of-year tour, but this was unfortunately overshadowed by the fact that 2005 and 2012 World Rugby Player of the Year-winning Crusaders teammate Dan Carter had been subbed off in the 25th minute of that match which was Carter's 100th.

Whitelock started in all three tests in the 2014 England rugby union tour of New Zealand with the All Blacks winning all three matches against England. Whitelock had another solid year in the black jersey, playing in a further eight tests that year. Whitelock carried this form into the 2015 Super Rugby season after the off-season, making rugby headlines after scoring a 60m solo try in a Super Rugby fixture against the Reds. Whitelock was selected for his second Rugby World Cup that year. Whitelock played in every single All Blacks test in the 2015 Rugby World Cup, including the full 80 minutes of the three knockout rounds. The 34–17 win over Australia in the World Cup Final meant Whitelock would become one of 21 players to win a Rugby World Cup title multiple times.

=== 2016–2017 ===
Whitelock made his 100th appearance for the Crusaders in 2016, scoring the opening try of their 85-26 thrashing of the Melbourne Rebels. After missing the first test against Wales due to injury in 2016, Whitelock returned to action in the second test of the Wales series, putting in another 80-minute performance. He became the most-capped All Blacks lock in 2016 making 11 appearances that year including one off the bench in a 36–17 win over Argentina on 1 October, surpassing the now-retired Ian Jones' 79 tests as an All Blacks lock. Whitelock missed Ireland's 40-29 victory over New Zealand in that year's end-of-season tour due to injury, allowing Crusaders teammate Scott Barrett to make his debut, returning from his calf strain to face Ireland in a 21–9 win.

Whitelock was one of the best performing players in the final test of 2016, which was a 24-19 scare from France, with the All Blacks going on to win 13 of their 14 tests that year. Whitelock was nominated for the best New Zealand Player of the Year at the 2016 NZ Rugby Awards alongside teammates Dane Coles and Beauden Barrett being the other nominees. Whitelock and Coles lost the award to Barrett.

Whitelock has become an established member of the Crusaders and New Zealand leadership groups in recent years, with new Crusaders coach Scott Robertson naming Whitelock as the captain of the franchise for 2017. Whitelock had an outstanding Super Rugby campaign in 2017 with the exception of a two-week suspension for striking Cheetahs prop Charles Marais. Whitelock was also yellow-carded for doing so that match. Whitelock captained the Crusaders in the historic fixture against the touring British & Irish Lions side in 2017, producing an 80-minute performance in the Crusaders' disappointing 3–12 loss to the Lions.

Whitelock was selected for the All Blacks' 33-man squad for the 2017 Pasifika Challenge against Samoa and three-test series against the British & Irish Lions. Whitelock started in all four of those matches but had his performance in the Lions series overshadowed by Brodie Retallick and the Lions' youngest player, English lock Maro Itoje who had started for the Lions twice in the test series. Whitelock returned from the Lions series to captain the Crusaders to their first Super Rugby title win since 2008. The Whitelock-lead Crusaders beat 2016 finalists the Lions 25–17 to claim their eighth Super Rugby title after losing only one match in the 2017 Super Rugby season.

Whitelock re-committed to New Zealand Rugby for another three years in 2017 and he made 12 appearances for the All Blacks in 2017 and for the final test of 2017- a 33–18 win over Wales, was named as captain of the All Blacks for the first time of his career, becoming the 69th test captain of the All Blacks. This came after Crusaders teammate and regular All Blacks captain Kieran Read was ruled out of the test due to the need for back surgery. Whitelock's younger brother Luke Whitelock who had captained a second-string All Blacks side to a 28–23 win over a French XV earlier on the end-of-year tour replaced Read as the starting number 8 for the test. Whitelock performed well in his first test as captain but he was unfortunately awarded the fourth yellow card of his test career in the 67th minute of the Welsh test for a professional foul.

After returning home to New Zealand, Whitelock won two awards at the 2017 NZ Rugby Awards, one for Super Rugby Player of the Year, and was chosen over All Blacks teammate Rieko Ioane and Black Ferns player Sarah Goss for the best New Zealand Player of the Year. This was a rare double, with 2016 and 2017 World Rugby Player of the Year- Beauden Barrett, not considered for the awards Whitelock won.

=== 2018–2019 ===
Whitelock was captain for the Crusaders in the 2018 Super Rugby season. After media speculation, on 20 May 2018, Whitelock was named by New Zealand head coach Steve Hansen as the Captain of the All Blacks, with flanker Sam Cane and returning-from-injury fullback Ben Smith named as Vice-Captains for the All Blacks' three-test series against France during the June internationals.

Having been in doubt due to his second concussion of the 2018 season, Whitelock returned from injury to lead New Zealand to a 52-11 victory over France in the first test of the series, where he was not subbed off. Whitelock performed very well in the next two tests as well, allowing the 2018 French series to be a 3-0 win to New Zealand. Whitelock lead the tackle count in the second test, a 26-13 win, having made 14 tackles during the test. Whitelock had another great game in the third test, a 49-14 win, before being replaced by debutant Jackson Hemopo off the bench. Whitelock subsequently captained the Crusaders to win Super Rugby following the June internationals. The Crusaders beat the Lions 37-18 on 4 August 2018, to win their first Super Rugby title at home in ten years.

With previous All Black captain, Kieran Read, returning from injury in the 2018 Rugby Championship, Whitelock stepped down as captain for the competition. Whitelock began the tournament by playing his 100th test for New Zealand on 18 August 2018, with the All Blacks beating Australia 38-13. Whitelock was one of the best performing players on the field and also played his 47th test in combination with Brodie Retallick, who was Man of the Match. Whitelock also became the youngest All Black to reach 100 tests, being only 29 years old at the time of their victory over Australia.

Although he was stricken by an abdominal injury, Whitelock chose to continue playing rugby while he was injured. Whitelock played in all six tests of the Rugby Championship, Captaining the All Blacks for a fifth time, during the competition, leading them to a 35-17 victory over Argentina while Kieran Read was rested, prior to the second test against South Africa, which was a narrow 32-30 win, thanks to a late Ardie Savea try.

Whitelock missed the test against Japan during the 2018 end-of-year tests, with selectors saving the last of Whitelock's energy for tests against England and Ireland. Whitelock's outstanding performance, on 10 November, against England, saw the All Blacks beat England 16-15, before losing to Ireland, 9-16, the following week. Whitelock did not play in the final test for the year, against Italy, and went home early in order to rest after a long year, involving over 1900 minutes of rugby played.

After an extended off-season, Whitelock returned to lead the Crusaders for the 2019 Super Rugby season in round 6 of the competition, having been named to lead them against the New South Wales Waratahs. This was following the Christchurch mosque shootings, which had caused the cancellation of a fixture against the Highlanders.

On 20 April 2019, Whitelock extended his contract with New Zealand Rugby and the Crusaders, signing on to 2023. Whitelock had previously been contracted until 2020 and will miss the 2020 Super Rugby season, to take a sabbatical playing for the Ōta City-based Panasonic Wild Knights, in the Japanese Top League.

Whitelock was named in New Zealand's 31-man squad for the 2019 Rugby World Cup, his third World Cup, having played in four of the five warm-up tests for the All Blacks prior to the competition, including a 92-7 defeat of Tonga, as well as a record-breaking 26-47 loss to Australia. Whitelock was named Captain for the All Blacks' 6 October Pool Match against Namibia, a 71-9 win. Whitelock started in the All Blacks' victory against Ireland in the quarter-final, and the semi-final defeat to England.

=== 2020–2023 ===
New All Blacks head coach Ian Foster named Whitelock in his squad for 2020, with Whitelock the lone active New Zealander from the 2011 Rugby World Cup. Whitelock went on to play five tests in a shortened 2020 season, before captaining the All Blacks eight times in 2021; with Sam Cane missing much of that year due to injury.

Surpassing Keven Mealamu as the second-to-most capped player in New Zealand's history, Whitelock again took the captain's armband for his four final appearances in 2022. To complete the season, Whitelock with Brodie Retallick created a world record lock combination of 64 tests together. This match was a 25-25 draw with England, at Twickenham Stadium.

In 2023, Whitelock was selected in the team for the 2023 Rugby World Cup in his fourth cup appearance and was the sole survivor from the 2011 triumph. On 29 September 2023, Whitelock became the most capped All Black of all time with 149 test caps, surpassing Richie McCaw who previously held the record with 148 test caps. Following his record-breaking appearance against Italy in a 96-17 win, Whitelock then became just the second male player in history and the first New Zealander to reach the milestone of 150 caps; after Welsh lock Alun Wyn Jones. Whitelock's 150th test was a 73-0 win over Uruguay on 5 October.

Named on the bench for the World Cup quarter-final, against Ireland, Whitelock went on to jackal the winning turnover, as the All Blacks narrowly avoided defeat with a 28-24 win. Whitelock replaced Shannon Frizell off the bench in the 2023 Rugby World Cup final, with South Africa claiming the title as New Zealand lost 11-12. He played his final and 153rd Test match for the All Blacks as a replacement in the 2023 Rugby World Cup final against South Africa in Paris on October 28, 2023

Whitelock, having signed with Pau in the French Top 14, retired from international rugby having scored 7 tries from 153 test caps.

== List of international test tries ==
Try	Date	Venue	Opponent	Result	Competition
1	12 June 2010	Yarrow Stadium, New Plymouth, New Zealand	Ireland	66–28 (Won)	2010 Mid-Year tests
2	12 June 2010	Yarrow Stadium, New Plymouth, New Zealand	Ireland	66–28 (Won)	2010 Mid-Year tests
3	20 November 2010	Aviva Stadium, Dublin, Ireland	Ireland	38-18 (Won)	2010 end-of-year tests
4	6 October 2012	FNB Stadium, Johannesburg, South Africa	South Africa	32-16 (Won)	2012 Rugby Championship
5	17 September 2016	AMI Stadium, Christchurch, New Zealand	South Africa	41–13 (Won)	2016 Rugby Championship
6	6 October 2019	Tokyo Stadium, Tokyo, Japan	Namibia	71–9 (Won)	2019 Rugby World Cup
7	24 September 2022	Eden Park, Auckland, New Zealand	Australia	40-14 (Won)	2022 Rugby Championship

Updated: 24 September 2022 Source:

== Honours ==
=== Super Rugby ===
- Super Rugby Centurion
- Super Rugby Champion - 2017, 2018, 2019, 2020, 2021, 2022, 2023
- Super Rugby Pacific Final Player of the Match
  - 2022, 2023

=== Individual ===
- New Zealand Rugby Player of the Year
  - Winner: 2017, nominated in 2016
- Test Rugby Centurion
- All Black Captain: 2017–2022 (18 tests)
- World Rugby Men's 15s Dream Team of the Year
  - 2022

In the 2025 New Year Honours, Whitelock was appointed an Officer of the New Zealand Order of Merit, for services to rugby and the community.

=== International ===
- Rugby World Cup / Webb Ellis Cup
  - Winners: 2011, 2015
  - Runner-up: 2023
  - Third-place: 2019
- Tri Nations/The Rugby Championship
  - Winners: 2010, 2012, 2013, 2014, 2016, 2017, 2018, 2020, 2021, 2022, 2023
  - Runners-up: 2015
- Bledisloe Cup
  - Winners: 2010, 2011, 2012, 2013, 2014, 2015, 2016, 2017, 2018, 2019, 2020, 2021, 2022, 2023
- Dave Gallaher Trophy
  - Winners: 2013 (2x), 2016, 2017, 2018
- Freedom Cup
  - Winners: 2012, 2013, 2014, 2015, 2016, 2017, 2018, 2019, 2022, 2023
- Hillary Shield
  - Winners: 2013, 2014 (2x), 2018, 2022
- British & Irish Lions series
  - Winners: 2017 (drawn series – shared title)
- World Rugby Team of the Year (New Zealand)
  - Winners: 2012, 2013, 2014, 2015, 2016, 2017
- Laureus Team of the Year (New Zealand)
  - Winners: 2016

== Personal life ==
Sam Whitelock is married to Hannah Lawton, with whom he has three children. Outside of rugby, he is a farmer by trade and will continue farming after his athletics career is over.

Sam Whitelock is a member of the Whitelock family rugby dynasty:

- George Whitelock - older brother, played (and captained) for Canterbury and the Crusaders; played for Otago and the All Blacks; coached in the Japanese "Top League";
- Adam Whitelock - older brother, played for Canterbury, the Crusaders, the All Black Sevens, and the French team Aviron Bayonnais;
- Luke Whitelock - younger brother, currently plays (and has captained) for Canterbury; played for the Crusaders and the Highlanders; played for (and captained) the All Blacks;
- Ben Funnell - cousin, played for Canterbury and the Crusaders;
- Braeden Whitelock - father, played for the Junior All Blacks;
- Nelson Dalzell (1921-1989) - grandfather, played for the All Blacks.

All four of the Whitelock brothers were educated in Feilding.
