= George Whitelock =

NZ international rugby union player

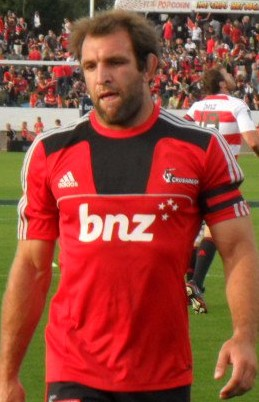
- Born: George Braeden Whitelock; 27 March 1986 (age 40) Palmerston North, New Zealand
- Height: 1.90 m (6 ft 3 in)
- Weight: 106 kg (16 st 10 lb)
- School: Feilding High School
- University: Lincoln University
- Notable relative(s): Adam Whitelock (brother); Luke Whitelock (brother); Sam Whitelock (brother); Ben Funnell (cousin); Nelson Dalzell (grandfather)

Rugby union career
- Position: Loose forward
Senior career
Years	Team	Apps	(Points)
2014	Panasonic Wild Knights	9	(20)
- Correct as of 13 December 2014
Provincial / State sides
Years	Team	Apps	(Points)
2007	Otago	10	(0)
2008–2014	Canterbury	70	(55)
- Correct as of 26 October 2013
Super Rugby
Years	Team	Apps	(Points)
2008–2014	Crusaders	86	(35)
- Correct as of 31 July 2014
International career
Years	Team	Apps	(Points)
2009	New Zealand	1	(5)
- Correct as of 27 June 2009

George Braeden Whitelock (born 27 March 1986) is a former New Zealand rugby union player. He played for the Crusaders in the Super Rugby competition and Canterbury in the Air New Zealand Cup. He played as a flanker.

== Biography ==
George is the son of a former Junior All Black, Braeden Whitelock, and the grandson of All Black Nelson Dalzell. He has three younger brothers including All Blacks Sam Whitelock and Luke Whitelock as well as former Crusaders player Adam Whitelock. All four of the Whitelock boys were educated in Feilding and played their junior rugby for Palmerston North High School Old Boys' Rugby Football Club.

Whitelock married former hockey player and Black Sticks Women captain Kayla Sharland in December 2013.

He retired in late 2015, opening a gym with his wife in Palmerston North. Whitelock also holds an agricultural diploma from Lincoln University.

== Rugby union career ==
=== Junior representative teams ===
Whitelock played for and captained both the New Zealand National Under-19 and New Zealand National Under-21 teams.

=== Provincial ===
Whitelock debuted for Otago in 2007 against Southland playing in all but two of their matches that season. The following year Whitelock transferred to Canterbury alongside his brother Adam. In his first year with Canterbury, Whitelock was part of the team which won the 2008 NPC. In 2009 Whitelock was named captain of the Canterbury team. He would go on to lead the Canterbury team through one of its most successful periods becoming the only player to captain a side to five NPC titles in a row.

Whitelock was also captain when Canterbury lifted the Ranfurly Shield from Wellington in 2009.

=== Super Rugby ===
Whitelock made his Crusaders debut against the Lions in 2008 becoming the first of the Whitelock brothers to do play for the Crusaders. In a remarkable occasion in professional sport teams all four Whitelock brothers played together for the first time in a competitive match in March 2013 (vs. Bulls). Other than a preseason match at the beginning of the previous season this was the first time playing together since playing for Fielding High School in 2003. The brothers would play a further 17 games together at their time with the Crusaders.

Despite playing for a Crusaders back row stacked with talent including All Blacks Reuben Thorne, Mose Tuiali'i, Richie McCaw, Keiran Read and Matt Todd. Whitelock played 86 games for the Crusaders including captaining them on a number of occasions.

Following the conclusion of the 2014 Super Rugby season Whitelock announced he was leaving to take up a one-year deal with the Robbie Deans coached Panasonic Wild Knights. Whitelock retired from all forms of rugby at the end of this deal.

=== All Blacks ===
Whitelock made his test debut for New Zealand in 2009 against Italy in Christchurch, impressing off the bench and scoring a try.

With brother Luke's All Black debut in 2013, George, Sam and Luke became the first trio of siblings to play for the All Blacks.
