= Luke Whitelock =

NZ rugby union player (born 1991)

- Full name: Luke Charles Whitelock
- Born: 29 January 1991 (age 35) Palmerston North, New Zealand
- Height: 190 cm (6 ft 3 in)
- Weight: 104 kg (16 st 5 lb; 229 lb)
- Notable relative(s): Ben Funnell (cousin); Adam Whitelock (brother); George Whitelock (brother); Sam Whitelock (brother)

Rugby union career
- Position(s): Lock, Flanker, Number 8
- Current team: Pau
Senior career
Years	Team	Apps	(Points)
2011–2018	Canterbury	66	(45)
2012–2015	Crusaders	51	(15)
2016–2019	Highlanders	44	(20)
2019–	Pau	92	(25)
- Correct as of 1 April 2023
International career
Years	Team	Apps	(Points)
2010–2011	New Zealand U20	9	(5)
2013–2018	New Zealand	8	(0)
- Correct as of 1 April 2023

Luke Charles Whitelock (born 29 January 1991) is a New Zealand rugby union player who currently plays as a loose forward for Section Paloise (Pau) in France's Top 14 rugby competition.

Whitelock has Captained Canterbury, the Highlanders and New Zealand's international team, the All Blacks throughout his professional career. Whitelock was capped for New Zealand 7 times between his international debut in 2013 and his final test in 2018. Whitelock has previously played for the Crusaders, New Zealand's U20 team, a World XV team and the Barbarian F.C. rugby club, internationally.

== Early career ==
Born in Palmerston North and raised on a dairy farm in the suburb of Linton, 11 km south-west of the city, Luke was born into a rugby household with his grandfather being 1950's All Black, Nelson Dalzell, father Braeden being a former Manawatu and New Zealand Colts representative and 3 older brothers; George, Adam and Sam all going on to play for Canterbury and the Crusaders with George and Sam also becoming All Blacks.

After attending a local primary school, Whitelock was sent to Feilding High School as a boarder and while there played first XV rugby, captaining the side in his final year. Following his graduation from high school, he moved south to attend university in Christchurch and began playing local club rugby for the University of Canterbury. He also took a gap year at Loughborough Grammar School for a year.

== Club career ==
Whitelock first made the Canterbury squad at the age of 20 ahead of the 2011 ITM Cup and went on to play 4 times during his first season of provincial rugby, earning his first ITM Cup Premiership winners medal as his side defeated Waikato 12–3 in the final. The following year, having gained some Super Rugby experience with the Crusaders, he became much more of a regular in Canterbury's starting XV, this time featuring 9 times and scoring his first ever provincial try as the men in red and black retained their ITM Cup title, this time overcoming Auckland 31–18 in the final.

2013 saw Whitelock win his 3rd ITM Cup in 3 years as Canterbury finished 2nd behind Wellington on the Premiership log, but were able to overcome the Lions 29–13 in the final. Whitelock scored 3 tries in 10 games to help Canterbury lift their 6th ITM Cup in a row. However, they were unable to hold on to their title in 2014, going down to local rivals, Tasman in the semi-final with Whitelock featuring in all 11 of their games during the year.

Ahead of the 2015 ITM Cup, Whitelock was named as Canterbury captain, following in the footsteps of older brother, George, who led the Cantabrians to five successive national titles between 2009 and 2013. Luke's captaincy got off to the perfect start as Canterbury went through the regular season with a record of 9 wins and 1 loss and after defeating Taranaki and Auckland in the playoffs they were crowned ITM Cup champions once again. It was a title they held onto in 2016, with the competition renamed the Mitre 10 Cup, but Whitelock still captaining a star-studded Canterbury side, they once again finished top of the Premiership log and after overpowering Counties Manukau in the semi-finals they gained revenge on Tasman for their 2013 semi-final loss by defeating them 43–27 in the final, making it 8 championships in 9 years.

Impressive displays in his debut season for Canterbury in 2011 saw Luke become the fourth Whitelock in the Crusaders Super Rugby squad for the 2012 season. Despite fierce competition for places among the franchise's loose forwards, he was able to get plenty of game time in his first season at Super Rugby level, playing mostly off of the replacements bench, he featured 10 times as the Crusaders, beaten finalists in 2011 made it to the competition semi-finals before going down 20–17 to New Zealand rivals and eventual winners the Chiefs.

In 2013, Whitelock played in all 18 of the Crusaders matches as they were once again eliminated at the semi-final stage by the Chiefs who went on to defend their title by defeating the Brumbies in the final. While in 2014 despite competing for a starting place with the likes of; Richie McCaw, Kieran Read and Jordan Taufua, Whitelock started a then career high 10 times and scored 2 tries to help the Crusaders make the Super Rugby final where they narrowly went down to the Waratahs in Sydney, losing 33–32.

2015 would prove to be his final year with the Crusaders and it would also be his least productive with the franchise, starting just twice out of a total of 8 appearances as the men from Christchurch endured a disappointing campaign and finished in 7th place, just missing out on the playoffs. The Highlanders were the competition's form team in 2015, defeating the Hurricanes 21–14 in the final and to bolster their squad ahead of their title defense in 2016, they announced that Whitelock would be moving south to join them ahead of the 2016 season. He started 12 times in his first season in Dunedin as his new franchise failed to retain their Super Rugby title, bowing out 42–30 to the Lions in the semi-finals.

=== Section Paloise ===
On 15 March 2019, Whitelock travels to France to sign for Top 14 side Pau on a three-year deal from the 2019–20 season.

Whitelock revealed that this decision was made with the full support of his wife. He joined a New Zealand contingent at Section Paloise, including Colin Slade, Conrad Smith, Ben Smith, and Tom Taylor, all under the guidance of Simon Mannix.

Whitelock made his debut in the green and white jersey during the 2019–20 European Rugby Challenge Cup at Stade du Hameau, helping secure a win against Cardiff Blues. He made his Top 14 debut a week later in a defeat to Stade Français at Stade Jean-Bouin. After a period of adjusting to his new environment and dealing with a few injuries, Whitelock showcased his full potential and established himself as a key player for the team.

With the arrival of Sébastien Piqueronies in 2021 and a shift in the club's focus towards player development, Whitelock's natural leadership qualities became instrumental in mentoring the younger players at Section.

In January 2022, Whitelock extended his contract for an additional two seasons, committing to stay until 2024. Known for his professionalism, discipline, and leadership, he shares the captaincy with Lucas Rey, Thibault Daubagna, and Beka Gorgadze. Whitelock led the team to a crucial victory over Aviron Bayonnais at a packed Anoeta Stadium, a key match for securing their Top 14 status. While he is adept at handling the ball, his defensive prowess is particularly notable. His consistent performance makes him a cornerstone of the team.

At the start of the 2023–24 season, Whitelock's brother Sam also joined Section Paloise. After 70 appearances in the green and white jersey, Luke Whitelock is a central figure in the club's project, now serving as its main captain. In March 2024, he signed a two-year contract extension, expressing his satisfaction with the club's direction and his family's enjoyment of life in Béarn, which has become their "second home."

== International ==
=== Early career ===
Whitelock was a New Zealand Schools representative in 2008 and was also a member of the New Zealand Under−20 sides which lifted the IRB Junior World Championship in 2010 and 2011, captaining the side in 2011 and playing a total of 9 games across both tournaments.

Whitelock earned his first call up to the senior New Zealand side ahead of the 2013 end-of-year rugby union internationals and debuted as a second-half replacement for Dominic Bird in a 54–6 victory over Japan in Tokyo.

=== 2016-2017 ===
On 5 November 2016, Whitelock featured in the number 8 jersey for the Barbarians in their 31–31 draw against South Africa at Wembley Stadium. He played all 80 minutes in a side which contained former Crusaders teammates Jordan Taufua and Andrew Ellis.

Whitelock was selected for the Barbarians again in 2017, starting for them against the All Blacks, in a 22–31 loss. Following the fixture, Whitelock was called into the All Blacks squad, as injury cover for 81-test veteran Jerome Kaino, who was also injured against the Barbarians, by coincidence. Whitelock was named to Captain the All Blacks against a French XV, in only his second appearance in a black jersey, the following week, playing the full 80 minutes of the match, as the All Blacks won the non-capped fixture by 28–23.

Whitelock then went on to start at number 8, in the test against Wales on the 2017 end-of-year tour as well, starting alongside his older brother, with Sam Captaining the All Blacks against Wales. Whitelock had a solid performance against Wales, in the 33–18 win, and was replaced by his former Crusaders team-mate, Matt Todd, in the 45th minute.

=== 2018 ===
Despite improved form from Akira Ioane throughout the 2018 Super Rugby season, Whitelock was preferred by All Blacks Head Coach, Steve Hansen, as back-up to the injured All Black Captain Kieran Read for the three-test series against France during the 2018 mid-year test window. Widely thought to be the most reliable backup to Read, Whitelock was chosen to start during the first test of the series. New Zealand prevailed 52–11 in a dominant display. His 73-minute performance, before being replaced by Vaea Fifita, saw him start during the second and third tests of the series as well. Whitelock was not subbed off in the second and third tests, and thanks to his reliable performances, established himself as New Zealand's clear second-choice number 8, after Kieran Read.

Whitelock was retained in the squad for the 2018 Rugby Championship, replacing Kieran Read, in the first test against Argentina, which took place in round three of the competition. The first test against Argentina ended in a 46–24 win for New Zealand.

After missing the first test against South Africa, Whitelock was named by the All Blacks selectors to start in place of Kieran Read, in the second test against Argentina, with Hurricanes flanker, Ardie Savea on the bench, while Sam Cane and Whitelock's Highlanders team-mate Shannon Frizell were named as the starting flankers. However, Whitelock suffered from illness, meaning Savea was drafted into the starting lineup only hours before the second test against Argentina took place, with Whitelock missing out on the second test against Argentina, as well as the second test against South Africa. Savea performed outstandingly in Whitelock's absence, winning Man of the Match, as the All Blacks won the Rugby Championship for the third year in a row.

For the 2018 end-of-year tour, Whitelock was only named in the wider training squad of the extended 51-man All Blacks squad, having only played one test during the Rugby Championship. Ardie Savea's outstanding performance at number 8 against Argentina, as well as the arrival of then-uncapped Blues flanker, Dalton Papalii and the return of Matt Todd from Japan, as well as Liam Squire from injury, were seen as reasons for Whitelock's omission from the main 31-man group travelling to Europe for tests against England, Ireland and Italy. Whitelock was named Captain of the All Blacks, for 3 November test against Japan, leading out a team containing eight test debutants. Whitelock became the 70th player to Captain the All Blacks in a test, leading them to a 69–31 win over Japan, after a hat-trick of tries from Ngani Laumape and two tries from debutant, George Bridge, sealed out the win.

== Career honours ==
New Zealand Under-20

- IRB Junior World Championship – 2010, 2011

Canterbury

- National Provincial Championship – 2011, 2012, 2013, 2015, 2016

All Blacks

- Dave Gallaher Trophy – 2018
- The Rugby Championship – 2018

== Super Rugby statistics ==
As of 11 January 2017

Season	Team	Games	Starts	Sub	Mins	Tries	Cons	Pens	Drops	Points	Yel	Red
2012	Crusaders	10	2	8	259	0	0	0	0	0	0	0
2013	Crusaders	18	7	11	734	1	0	0	0	5	0	0
2014	Crusaders	14	10	4	841	2	0	0	0	10	0	0
2015	Crusaders	8	2	6	242	0	0	0	0	0	0	0
2016	Highlanders	12	12	0	835	0	0	0	0	0	0	0
Total		62	33	29	2911	3	0	0	0	15	0	0
