= Braithwaite (surname) =

Braithwaite, Brathwaite, or Brathwait is an English surname of Old Norse origin. At the time of the British Census of 1881, the relative frequency of the surname Braithwaite was highest in Westmorland (37.3 times the British average), followed by Cumberland, Yorkshire, Linlithgowshire, Lancashire, County Durham, Nottinghamshire, Leicestershire, Anglesey and Flintshire. Notable people with the surname include:

- Sir Albert Braithwaite (1893–1959), British politician
- Althea Braithwaite (1940–2020), English children's author, illustrator, publisher and glass artist
- Anna Braithwaite (1788–1859), English Quaker minister
- Bob Braithwaite (1925–2015), British trap shooter
- Brenda Brathwaite (born 1966), American video game designer and developer
- Carlos Brathwaite (born 1988), Barbadian cricketer
- Charles Braithwaite (1850–1910), Canadian politician and agrarian leader
- Chelston Brathwaite, Barbadian senator
- Chris Braithwaite aka Chris Jones (1885–1944), Barbadian seaman, leader of the Colonial Seamen's Association
- Darren Braithwaite (born 1969), British sprinter
- Daryl Braithwaite (born 1949), Australian pop singer
- Diana Braithwaite, Canadian singer–songwriter
- Donald Braithwaite (1936–2017), Welsh boxer
- Doug Braithwaite, British comic book artist
- Edward A. Braithwaite (1862–1949), doctor
- Edward Kamau Brathwaite (1930–2020), Barbadian poet
- E. R. Braithwaite (1912–2016), Guyanese novelist, writer, teacher, and diplomat
- Errol Brathwaite (1924–2005), New Zealand author
- Fred Brathwaite (born 1972), Canadian ice hockey player
- George Braithwaite (disambiguation)
- Gregory Brathwaite (born 1969), Barbadian cricket umpire
- Sir Gurney Braithwaite, 1st Baronet (1895–1958), English politician
- Jahron Anthony Brathwaite aka PartyNextDoor (born 1993), Canadian singer, songwriter, record producer and rapper
- Jeffrey Braithwaite, Australian professor in the field of health policy
- Jessica Braithwaite, Australian television presenter and reporter
- John Braithwaite (disambiguation)
- Joseph Braithwaite (mayor) (1848–1917), New Zealand bookseller and politician, mayor of Dunedin
- Joseph Bevan Braithwaite (1818–1905), English Quaker minister
- Junior Braithwaite (1949–1999), Jamaican reggae musician
- Keith Braithwaite, New Zealand football player and manager
- Kenneth Braithwaite (born 1960), American politician, diplomat and businessman
- Kraigg Brathwaite (born 1992), West Indian cricketer
- Lawrence Ytzhak Braithwaite (1963–2008) Canadian novelist, spoken word artist, dub poet, essayist, digital drummer and short fiction writer
- Leon Braithwaite (born 1972), English footballer
- Leonard Braithwaite (1923–2012), Canadian lawyer and politician
- Dame Lilian Braithwaite (1873–1948), English actress
- Marcel Braithwaite (born 1994), English professional boxer
- Martin Braithwaite (born 1991), Danish footballer
- Max Braithwaite (1911–1995), Canadian novelist and non-fiction author
- Michael Braithwaite (born 1987), Canadian rower
- Minnie Braithwaite Jenkins (1874–1954), American school teacher
- Sir Nicholas Brathwaite (1925–2016), prime minister of Grenada
- Nicholas Braithwaite (born 1939), English conductor
- Oyinkan Braithwaite (born 1988), Nigerian-British novelist
- Ray Braithwaite (born 1933), Australian politician
- Rewi Braithwaite (1897–1987), New Zealand football player
- Richard Brathwait or Brathwaite (1588–1673), English poet
- R. B. Braithwaite (1900–1990), English philosopher
- Robert Braithwaite (disambiguation)
- Roderick Braithwaite (1901–1963), New Zealand politician, mayor of Hamilton
- Sir Rodric Braithwaite (born 1932), British diplomat and author
- Ryan Brathwaite (born 1988), Barbadian track and field athlete
- Ryan Brathwaite (politician), Barbadian politician
- Sam Hartley Braithwaite (1883–1947), British composer and artist
- Stuart Braithwaite (born 1976), Scottish guitarist, bassist, drummer, singer and songwriter
- Talabi Braithwaite (1928–2011), Nigerian insurance broker
- Ted Braithwaite (1902–1990), English footballer
- Tut Braithwaite (born 1946), British rock climber and mountaineer
- Victoria Braithwaite (1967–2019), British scientist
- Walt Braithwaite (born 1945), Jamaican-born American engineer
- Sir Walter Braithwaite (1865–1945), British Army general during World War I
- Walter H. Braithwaite (1906–1991), English composer, pianist and teacher
- Warwick Braithwaite (1896–1971), New Zealand-born British conductor
- Wayne Braithwaite (born 1975), Guyanese boxer
- William Charles Braithwaite (1862–1922), British Quaker historian
- William Garnett Braithwaite (1870–1937), British Army general who served with New Zealand Military Forces during World War I
- William Stanley Braithwaite (1878–1962), African-American poet, literary critic and scholar

== In fiction ==
- Edna Braithwaite, a maid in the television programme Downton Abbey
- Geoffrey Braithwaite, fictional character in Julian Barnes's novel Flaubert's Parrot
- Pandora Braithwaite, fictional character in the Adrian Mole series by British author Sue Townsend
- Braithwaite family, fictional characters in the At Home with the Braithwaites TV series
- Braithwaite family, fictional characters in the Red Dead Redemption 2 video game.
- Nigel Braithwaite, AKA Roundabout, fictional character in the Carmen Sandiego TV series

== See also ==
- Braithwaite, a village in Cumbria, England
- Braithwaite (disambiguation)
