= John Braithwaite =

John Braithwaite may refer to:

- John Braithwaite (engineer) (1797–1870), English engineer who invented the first steam fire engine
- John Braithwaite (criminologist) (born 1951), criminologist at the Australian National University
- John Braithwaite (sport shooter) (1925–2015), known as Bob Braithwaite, British trap shooter
- John Braithwaite (writer) (born 1633), English Quaker
- John Braithwaite (author) (1700–1768), English author
- John Braithwaite the elder (1760–1818), British engineer
- John Braithwaite (soldier) (1885–1916), New Zealand journalist, soldier and convicted mutineer
- Sir John Braithwaite, 1st Baronet (1739–1803), Commander-in-Chief of the Madras Army

== See also ==
- John Braithwaite Wallis (1877–1961), Canadian entomologist
- Braithwaite (surname)
