= Nicholas Braithwaite =

English conductor

- Born: Nicholas Paul Dallon Braithwaite; 26 August 1939 (age 87); London, England
- Years active: Since 1960s
- Relatives: Warwick Braithwaite (father); Joseph Braithwaite (grandfather); Rodric Braithwaite (brother); Jill Braithwaite (sister-in-law); John Braithwaite (uncle); Rewi Braithwaite (uncle); Roderick Braithwaite (uncle); David Braithwaite (cousin)

Nicholas Paul Dallon Braithwaite (born 26 August 1939, London) is an English conductor. He is the son of the conductor Warwick Braithwaite.

== Biography ==
Braithwaite studied at the Royal Academy of Music, at the Festival masterclasses in Bayreuth, and with Hans Swarowsky in Vienna. In the 1960s, Braithwaite was associate conductor of the Bournemouth Symphony Orchestra. He served as resident conductor at Sadler's Wells Opera for three seasons, from 1971 to 1974, where he conducted Richard Wagner's Ring cycle. In 1976, he was named music director of Glyndebourne Touring Opera., and served in that post until 1980. With the Manchester Camerata, Braithwaite was principal guest conductor from 1977 to 1984, and principal conductor from 1984 to 1991. He has served as principal guest conductor of the Norwegian Radio Orchestra. He has made recordings with orchestras such as the London Philharmonic, London Symphony and Philharmonia orchestras. He was named musical director and chief conductor of Gothenburg's Stora Teatern in 1981, and served there until 1984.

In Australia, Braithwaite was principal conductor of the Adelaide Symphony Orchestra, from 1987 to 1991, and also held the same post with the Tasmanian Symphony Orchestra. Braithwaite has also served as the Dean of Music at the Victorian College of the Arts from 1988 to 1991.

Braithwaite married Gillian Agnes Haggarty in August 1985. They have one daughter (Dr Felicity Braithwaite) and one son (Christopher Braithwaite).

Cultural offices
Preceded by Kenneth Montgomery	Music Director, Glyndebourne Touring Opera; 1976–1980	Succeeded by Jane Glover
Preceded by Szymon Goldberg	Principal Conductor, Manchester Camerata; 1984–1991	Succeeded by Sachio Fujioka
