= George Braithwaite =

George Braithwaite may refer to:

- George Braith (born George Braithwaite, 1939), American saxophonist
- Sir George Braithwaite, 2nd Baronet (1762–1809), of the Braithwaite baronets

== See also ==
- Braithwaite (surname)
