= Warwick Braithwaite =

- Braithwaite in c1944

Background information
- Born: Henry Warwick Braithwaite; 9 January 1896; Dunedin, New Zealand
- Died: 19 January 1971 (aged 75) London, England
- Years active: 1919–1971
- Relatives: Joseph Braithwaite (father); Rodric Braithwaite (son); Nicholas Braithwaite (son); Jill Braithwaite (daughter-in-law); John Braithwaite (brother); Rewi Braithwaite (brother); Roderick Braithwaite (brother); David Braithwaite (nephew)

Henry Warwick Braithwaite (9 January 1896 – 19 January 1971) was a New Zealand-born orchestral conductor. He worked mostly in Great Britain and was especially known for his work in opera.

== Early life and family ==
Braithwaite was one of the youngest of a large number of children (at least 16 and as many as 22 children, but the records are inadequate) born to Joseph Braithwaite and Mary Ann Braithwaite (née Bellett) in Dunedin. His father was later mayor of Dunedin between 1905 and 1906.

The family were musical – the Braithwaite family would perform Gilbert and Sullivan to friends and relatives in their 20-room house in Dunedin, and his elder sister Mabel Manson emigrated to England before he was born, where she made a considerable career as a singer.

Braithwaite's brothers included John Braithwaite, who was convicted and executed for mutiny during World War I and pardoned by the New Zealand government in 2000, and Rewi Braithwaite, who played in New Zealand's first official international soccer match, against Australia in 1922.

Braithwaite served briefly in the New Zealand armed forces during World War I. He won various competitions as both a composer and pianist and then followed his sister to England in 1916 as the Goring Thomas Compositions Scholar at the Royal Academy of Music in London, where he studied composition and piano.

== Musical career ==
He joined the O’Mara Opera Company as chorus master, a touring opera company run by the Irish tenor Joseph O'Mara, and with them made his debut as a conductor with Auber's Fra Diavolo in 1919. After this he joined the British National Opera Company as a repetiteur and also in 1922 spent a year working for Bruno Walter at the Bavarian State Opera in Munich. When Walter left to go to America, Hans Knappertsbusch was appointed to the job and immediately terminated the employment of any non-Germans working for the company. Thereafter he became the first assistant musical director of 2LO, the precursor to the BBC, and then moved to the BBC's Cardiff 5WA Station Orchestra where he conducted many of the first UK performances of Sibelius's music. That orchestra was closed down when the BBC decided to centralise its efforts and put its money into the newly formed BBC Symphony Orchestra in London under Sir Adrian Boult.

In 1931 Braithwaite joined the Vic-Wells, later the Sadler's Wells Opera Company, the company run by the fiercely autocratic Lilian Baylis, who persuaded the politicians Winston Churchill and Stanley Baldwin, the writers G. K. Chesterton and John Galsworthy, the composer Ethel Smyth, and the conductor Thomas Beecham to raise funds for a new theatre at Sadler's Wells in Islington, where there had been a theatre since 1683.

The company performed not only opera, but ballet and theatre as well: among its stars were Laurence Olivier, John Gielgud, Margot Fonteyn, Robert Helpmann, Joan Cross, Constant Lambert. In 1931, Braithwaite's first year, the company performed fourteen operas; the next year it performed twenty six operas. In all the company put on fifty operas between 1931 and 1939: a remarkably ambitious undertaking. Braithwaite conducted Wagner's Mastersingers and Lohengrin, Beethoven's Fidelio, the Mozart operas (including Cosi Fan Tutte, then rarely done), Verdi's Don Carlos and a highly successful Falstaff, the Puccini operas, and Ethel Smythe's The Wreckers. The theatre closed down briefly when the war began but soon reopened. Braithwaite conducted Puccini's Tosca at Sadler's Wells on the afternoon of 7 September 1940. Lawrance Collingwood conducted Gounod's Faust the same evening. That was the first night of the Blitz, and one of the worst. London was set on fire by waves of German bombs, 430 people were killed and 1,600 badly injured. Braithwaite watched the raid from the roof of the theatre.

In 1940 he succeeded George Szell as principal conductor of the Scottish Orchestra and while there oversaw the expansion of its season from three months to six months per year. While in Glasgow he also conducted the US Army Air Force Band, the band founded by Glenn Miller. During the war he was also much involved in the campaign to save the London Philharmonic Orchestra during these years and can be seen in the film Battle for Music, which documents that story.

After the war he joined the Royal Opera House, Covent Garden, as music director of the Ballet Company where he conducted the western premiere of Prokofiev's Cinderella with Moira Shearer in the title role. He also conducted operas with some of the period's greatest singers, among them Boris Christoff in Boris Godunov, and Victoria de los Ángeles in her debut as Puccini's Mimi. And also a performance of Aida with Astrid Varnay singing Aida in Italian, Hans Hopf singing Radames in German and Jess Walters singing Ramphis in English.

He toured Australia in 1947 as a guest conductor, with concerts in all of the mainland capital cities.

In 1953, he was awarded the Queen Elizabeth II Coronation Medal. He was conductor of the National Orchestra of New Zealand in 1954 and then music director of the National Opera of Australia in 1954–55. In 1956 he returned to Britain as musical director of the Welsh National Opera from 1956 to 1960, where he conducted a range of interesting and little known repertoire such as Verdi's I Lombardi and La battaglia di Legnano, Boito's Mefistofele and Rimsky-Korsakov's May Night as well as the standard repertoire. In 1960 he rejoined Sadler's Wells Opera where he conducted until his retirement in 1968.

In 1970 he travelled to Australia where he conducted Fidelio with the Australian Opera Company.

He was a fellow of the Royal Academy of Music.

== Personal life and death ==
Braithwaite married first Phyllis Greatrex (née Bain) in 1925, with whom he had a daughter, Barbara, a nurse. Then, in 1931, he married Lorna Constance Davies with whom he had two sons, Sir Rodric Braithwaite, diplomat and author, and the conductor Nicholas Braithwaite. He died in London on 19 January 1971, and was buried at Levington in Suffolk in the same grave as his three-year-old grandson Mark who had died the same year.

== Legacy ==
His recording legacy is mainly as an accompanist to some of the greatest singers of the mid twentieth century – Elisabeth Schwarzkopf, Sena Jurinac, Kirsten Flagstad, Tito Gobbi, Nicola Rossi-Lemeni and Joan Hammond amongst others. There are also some recordings of ballet music with the Royal Opera House Orchestra which were released on the Parlophone label, and there are a few recordings of BBC broadcasts of complete operas, among them Puccini's La fanciulla del West with Sadler's Wells and I Lombardi with the Welsh National Opera.

Also active as a composer, writing two operas (including The Pendragon, about King Arthur) as well as a varied collection of other pieces Braithwaite wrote the book The Conductor's Art (ISBN 978-0313200588), published in 1952. His compositions and other papers are held in the Alexander Turnbull Library in Wellington, New Zealand. A previously unpublished autobiography, with surrounding notes and additions by Roger Flury, was issued in 2023.

Cultural offices
Preceded by George Szell	Principal conductor, Scottish Orchestra; 1940–1946	Succeeded by Walter Susskind
Preceded by Vilém Tauský	Music director, Welsh National Opera; 1956–1960	Succeeded by Charles Groves
