= David Braithwaite =

New Zealand politician (1937–2021)

David Braithwaite OBE

31st Mayor of Hamilton
- In office 2001–2004
- Preceded by: Russ Rimmington
- Succeeded by: Michael Redman

Personal details
- Born: David Joseph Braithwaite; 16 April 1937 Hamilton, New Zealand
- Died: 18 March 2021 (aged 83) Hamilton, New Zealand
- Parent: Roderick Braithwaite (father)
- Relatives: Joseph Braithwaite (grandfather); John Braithwaite (uncle); Rewi Braithwaite (uncle); Warwick Braithwaite (uncle); Nicholas Braithwaite (cousin); Rodric Braithwaite (cousin)

David Joseph Braithwaite OBE (16 April 1937 – 18 March 2021) was a New Zealand politician. He was mayor of Hamilton from 2001 to 2004.

Braithwaite was born in Hamilton on 16 April 1937. Both of his parents were prominent in civic life in Hamilton. His father, Roderick Braithwaite, served as mayor of Hamilton, between 1953 and 1959; and his mother, Kathleen Braithwaite (née Arey), was a city councillor from 1962 to 1974, including a period as deputy mayor.

In the 1992 Queen's Birthday Honours, Braithwaite was appointed an Officer of the Order of the British Empire, for services to the Trustbank organisation and the community.

Braithwaite died in Hamilton on 18 March 2021, aged 83.

Political offices
Preceded by Russ Rimmington	Mayor of Hamilton; 2001–2004	Succeeded by Michael Redman
