= List of New Zealand soldiers executed during World War I =

The following soldiers serving on the Western Front with the New Zealand Expeditionary Force were executed for military offences during World War I. The executions, carried out by firing squad, were not made public at the time. All five were posthumously pardoned on 14 September 2000, when New Zealand's Pardon for Soldiers of the Great War Act became law. The bill was presented by Mark Peck, Member of Parliament for Invercargill. The vote was 112 for the motion and five against.

== List ==
Name	Age	Unit	Executed	Offence	Notes
Frank Hughes	28	2nd Bn, Canterbury Regt	25 Aug 1916	Desertion	Poor military and disciplinary record, deserted en route to the front.
John Sweeney	37	1st Bn, Otago Regt	2 Oct 1916	Desertion	An Australian, born in Tasmania. His brother died on the Western Front in 1918, while his father committed suicide in 1925, just before details of his execution were made public.
John Braithwaite	31	2nd Bn, Otago Regt	29 Oct 1916	Mutiny	Prior to the war, he had worked as a journalist in Australia. After being incarcerated for repeatedly being AWOL, he was accused of instigating a prison riot, although he claimed that he only involved himself to assist in break it up.
John King	32	1st Bn, Canterbury Regt	19 Aug 1917	Desertion	Had a long record of going absent, desertion and illness; possibly an alcoholic.
Victor Spencer	23	1st Bn, Otago Regt	24 Feb 1918	Desertion	Deserted from near the front line. A Māori engineer in a non-Māori pioneer unit, shell-shocked in July 1915.

== See also ==
- List of people executed in New Zealand

== Sources ==
- Pugsley, Christopher (1991). On the Fringe of Hell. Auckland: Hodder & Stoughton. ISBN 978-0-340-53321-5
- Putkowski, Julian & Sykes, Julian (1966). Shot at Dawn: Executions in World War One by Authority of the British Army Act. Barnsley: Pen & Sword ISBN 978-0-85052-613-4
- Public Record Office, London, Judge Advocate General's Register.
- Archives New Zealand, BRAITHWAITE, Jack - WW1 24/1521 - Army, Ref: AABK 18805 W5520/110.
- New Zealand Pardon for Soldiers of the Great War Act 2000
- The executed five Great War Story from nzhistory.net video
- "The executed five Great War Story". newshub (video). April 22, 2015. Archived from the original on June 2, 2016.
