= Edward A. Braithwaite =

Canadian police officer and doctor (born 1862)

Edward Ainslie Braithwaite
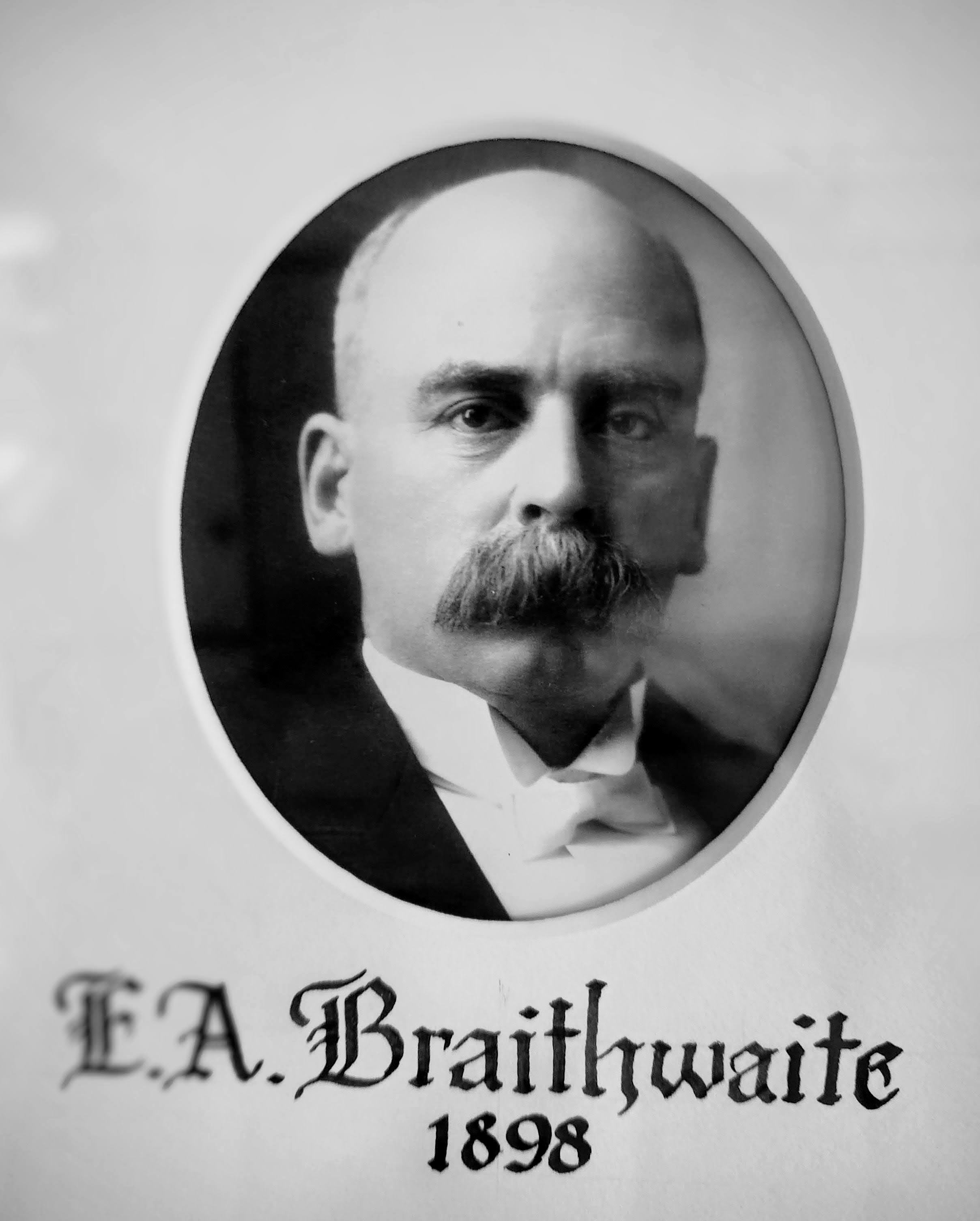
- Born: 16 February 1862; Alne, Yorkshire, England
- Died: 7 December 1949 (aged 87); Edmonton, Alberta, Canada
- Occupations: RCMP medical officer, doctor, coroner

Edward Ainslie Braithwaite was a long-serving member of the Royal Canadian Mounted Police, a pioneer doctor, and coroner for over 50 years. He also was an active Freemason for 56 years.

== Early life ==
Braithwaite was born in Alne, Yorkshire, England on February 16, 1862, to Reverend William Braithwaite and Laura E. Pipon. He was the brother to Sir Walter Braithwaite, A. Douglas Braithwaite and two sisters, including his twin. He began his medical education at Westward Ho United Service College in Devonshire, then at King's College London. At age 22 he immigrated to Canada in 1884.

== Career ==
Braithwaite served in the North-West Mounted Police, RNWMP, and Royal Canadian Mounted Police for a total of 47 years and 8 months; the longest service of any medical member of the force.

Braithwaite arrived in Edmonton in 1892 and that same year he opened the first private medical practice in the city. Braithwaite performed the first surgical operation in Edmonton in the late 1890s and made significant contributions to the medical field in Alberta. Braithwaite had the city's first X-ray machine (bought in 1906, which took 20 minutes of hand-cranking to produce an image). He was the Medical Officer of Health and the Coroner for the NWT (before Alberta became a province in 1905). In 1932 Braithwaite was appointed Chief Coroner for the Province as well as the Medical Inspector for hospitals. He served as a coroner for 52 years, and it is estimated that in his career he oversaw over 8,000 inquests.

Braithwaite was Edmonton's first medical health officer, helping create the city's health department. He established the St John's Ambulance Association in Alberta, and served on the Canadian Medical Association. In 1911 he was bestowed the title of Honorary Surgeon to the RCMP.

He was a veteran of the North-West Rebellion, and eyewitness to Louis Riel's execution. Braithwaite had a strong work ethic, working until he was 86 years old. In 1944 Braithwaite was awarded a life membership in the Canadian Medical Association.

== Freemason ==
Braithwaite became a Freemason in 1893. He was the Master of Edmonton for 1898. Braithwaite was the Senior Grand Master of the Grand Lodge of Alberta when it formed in 1905 (when Alberta became a province). The first Alberta-born Grand Master of the Grand Lodge of Alberta had been a baby that Braithwaite delivered; he later presented Braithwaite with his 50th year jewel.

In 1914 Braithwaite acquired the land that the Freemason's Lodge sits upon; he sold it to the Freemasons for $12,500 and attended the sod-turning event on July 12, 1930. He had a long and distinguished career in Freemasonry and was well thought of by his Freemason Brothers.

== Legacy ==
Braithwaite died after a short illness in Edmonton on 7 December 1949.

South of the University Hospital, there is a city park in his name in Edmonton (112 St and University Avenue).

== See also ==
- Braithwaite (disambiguation)
