= Rodric Braithwaite =

British diplomat and author

Sir Rodric Braithwaite GCMG

British Ambassador to Russia
- In office 1991–1992
- Prime Minister: John Major
- Preceded by: New office
- Succeeded by: Brian Fall

British Ambassador to the Soviet Union
- In office 1988–1991
- Prime Minister: Margaret Thatcher; John Major
- Preceded by: Bryan Cartledge
- Succeeded by: Office abolished

Personal details
- Born: 17 May 1932 (age 94)
- Spouse: Jill Braithwaite (m. 1961; died 2008)
- Children: 4
- Parent: Warwick Braithwaite (father)
- Relatives: Nicholas Braithwaite (brother); Joseph Braithwaite (grandfather); John Braithwaite (uncle); Rewi Braithwaite (uncle); Roderick Braithwaite (uncle); David Braithwaite (cousin)
- Education: Christ College, Cambridge

Sir Rodric Quentin Braithwaite, GCMG (born 17 May 1932) is a British former diplomat and author.

== Public life ==
Braithwaite was educated at Bedales School and Christ's College, Cambridge.

After his military service, he joined HM Diplomatic Service in 1955. His diplomatic career included posts in Indonesia, Italy, Poland, the Soviet Union, and a number of positions at the Foreign and Commonwealth Office.

From 1988 to 1992 Braithwaite was ambassador in Moscow, first of all under Margaret Thatcher to the Soviet Union and then under John Major to the Russian Federation.

Subsequently, he was the Prime Minister's foreign policy adviser and chairman of the UK Joint Intelligence Committee (1992–93), and was awarded the GCMG in 1994.

=== Books ===
- Across the Moscow River: The World Turned Upside Down. New Haven, Conn.: Yale University Press. 2002. pp. 371. ISBN 978-0-300-09496-1. LCCN 2001007277. OCLC 48450825. LCC DK510.763 .B73 2002
- Moscow 1941: A City and Its People at War. London: Profile Books. 2006. p. 446. ISBN 978-1-86197-759-5. LCCN 2007277027. OCLC 63137298. LCC D764.3.M6 B73 2006b
- Afgantsy: The Russians in Afghanistan, 1979–89. London: Profile Books. 2012. p. 417. ISBN 978-0-19-983265-1. LCCN 2011015052. OCLC 768329528. LCC DS371.2 .B725 2011
- Armageddon and Paranoia: The Nuclear Confrontation. Profile Books. 2017. ISBN 978-1781257197.
- Russia: Myths and Realities. Profile Books. 2022. ISBN 978-1800811881.

== Personal life ==
Braithwaite was married in April 1961 to the former Gillian Mary Robinson (15 September 1937 – 10 November 2008), better known as the archaeologist and Roman face pottery expert Jill Braithwaite. They had several children, including three sons and one daughter - Richard, Katharine, Julian (whose twin brother, Mark, died in 1971) and David.
