= Joseph Braithwaite (mayor) =

New Zealand bookseller and politician

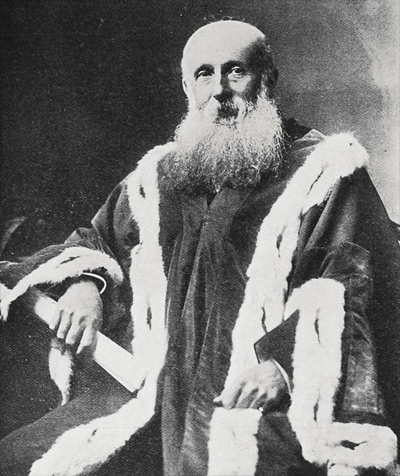
- Braithwaite in mayoral robes (20 July 1905)

30th Mayor of Dunedin
- In office 1905–1906
- Preceded by: Thomas Reid Christie
- Succeeded by: George Lawrence

Personal details
- Born: 1848 Cliburn, Penrith, Westmorland, England
- Died: 27 March 1917 (aged 69) St Clair, Dunedin, New Zealand
- Spouse: Mary Ann Bellett (m. 1872)
- Children: John Braithwaite; Warwick Braithwaite; Rewi Braithwaite; Roderick Braithwaite
- Relatives: David Braithwaite (grandson); Nicholas Braithwaite (grandson); Rodric Braithwaite (grandson)
- Occupation: Bookseller

Joseph Braithwaite (1848 – 27 March 1917) was a New Zealand bookseller and politician. He was mayor of Dunedin from 1905 to 1906.

== Early life and family ==
Braithwaite was born in Cliburn, near Penrith in the northwest of England, in 1848. The family emigrated to Melbourne, Australia in 1852, but Braithwaite's mother died during the voyage. His father subsequently remarried and the family moved again, in 1860, to Dunedin, New Zealand. Braithwaite's father died about three years later. He married Mary Ann Bellett in Dunedin on 2 July 1872, and they had at least 16, and as many as 22, children. Among them, John Braithwaite, was convicted and executed for mutiny during World War I, and was finally pardoned by the New Zealand government in 2000. Other sons included Rewi Braithwaite, who played in New Zealand's first official international soccer match, against Australia in 1922; Warwick Braithwaite, who became a noted orchestral conductor; and Roderick Braithwaite, who served as mayor of Hamilton between 1953 and 1959.

== Bookseller ==
In 1863, Braithwaite established "Braithwaite's Circulating Library" in Farley's Arcade at the corner of High Street and Fleet Street, Dunedin. By 1867, he was also trading as a newsagent. From humble beginnings, the business expanded and moved, eventually becoming "Braithwaite's Book Arcade" at 38–40 Princes Street in 1883.

== Council and mayoral career ==
Braithwaite was first elected to the Dunedin City Council in 1901 and re-elected two years later. He was elected unopposed as mayor of Dunedin in 1905 and retired after serving for a one-year term. His mayoralty was characterised by the practical completion of the Dunedin tramway system. He also spent three years on the Ocean Beach Domain Board and served as a member of the city's licensing committee.

== Other activities ==
Braithwaite belonged to the Independent Order of Odd Fellows and was a past grand master and life member. He was a member of the Anglican Synod from 1892, and also served on the City Mission committee and the committee of the Bible in State Schools League. He was also vice-president of the Otago Football Association for a time, and chairman of the Empire Pictures Company.

== Death ==
Braithwaite died at his home in the Dunedin suburb of St Clair on 27 March 1917, and was buried at the Southern Cemetery.

Political offices
Preceded by Thomas Reid Christie	Mayor of Dunedin; 1905–1906	Succeeded by George Lawrence
