= Pardon for Soldiers of the Great War Act 2000 =

Act of Parliament in New Zealand

Pardon for Soldiers of the Great War Act 2000 is statute law in New Zealand. The act sought to remove the blight on their character of five soldiers who were unjustly executed during World War I. One of the pardoned soldiers named in the act was from New Zealand's southern port town of Bluff and he is now honoured in the town's maritime museum. The bill was opposed by the ACT party, which argued it was inappropriate and an insult to the memory of everyone who fought in the war.

== The pardoned soldiers ==
They were all awarded medals posthumously, after the act was passed.

- John (Jack) Braithwaite, PTE, b. 1882 in Dunedin. British War Medal, Victory Medal, New Zealand Certificate of Honour.
- Frank Hughes, PTE, b. 1888 in Croydon, Southland. British War Medal, Victory Medal, New Zealand Certificate of Honour.
- John King, PTE, b. 1885 in Victoria, Australia. 1914-15 Star, British War Medal, Victory Medal, New Zealand Certificate of Honour, Anzac Commemorative Medallion.
- Victor Manson Spencer, PTE, b. 1894 in Otautau, Southland. 1914-15 Star, British War Medal; Victory Medal, New Zealand Certificate of Honour, Anzac Commemorative Medallion.
- John Joseph Sweeney, PTE, b. 1879 in Sprent, Tasmania. 1914-15 Star, British War Medal, Victory Medal, New Zealand Certificate of Honour, Anzac Commemorative Medallion.

== See also ==
- List of New Zealand soldiers executed during World War I
- Shot at Dawn Memorial
