= Robert Braithwaite =

Robert Braithwaite may refer to:

- Robert Braithwaite (bryologist) (1824–1917), English botanist
- Robert Braithwaite (engineer) (1943–2019), British engineer

== See also ==
- Braithwaite (surname)
