= Russ Rimmington =

30th Mayor of Hamilton, New Zealand

Russ Rimmington QSO JP

30th Mayor of Hamilton, New Zealand
- In office November 1998 – November 2001
- Preceded by: Margaret Evans
- Succeeded by: David Braithwaite

Personal details
- Born: Russell Mathew Rimmington; 29 December 1945 (age 80) Oamaru, New Zealand
- Spouse(s): Vivienne Wallace; Edwina Nieper
- Children: 4

Russell Mathew Rimmington QSO JP (born 29 December 1945) is a New Zealand politician who was the 30th Mayor of Hamilton.

== Biography ==
Rimmington was born on 29 December 1945 in Oamaru, New Zealand. In the 2003 New Year Honours, he was appointed a Companion of the Queen's Service Order for public services. Following the 2019 local elections, he was elected chair of the Waikato Regional Council. In May 2022 he was removed as chair by the council and replaced with Barry Quayle, due to racist comments he had made regarding the Three Waters reform programme in October 2021.

Political offices
Preceded by Margaret Evans	Mayor of Hamilton, New Zealand; 1998–2001	Succeeded by David Braithwaite
