= Braithwaite (disambiguation) =

Braithwaite is a village in the northern Lake District, England.

Braithwaite may also refer to:

== Places ==
- Braithwaite railway station, a disused railway station in Braithwaite, England
- Braithwaite Hall, a manor house in Coverdale, North Yorkshire, England
- Braithwaite House, a historic house in Bentonville, Arkansas
- Braithwaite, Louisiana, an unincorporated community in Plaquemines Parish, Louisiana
- Braithwaite Memorial Specialist Hospital, a hospital in Port Harcourt

== People ==
- Braithwaite (surname), people with the surname
- Braithwaite baronets, two baronetcies in the Baronetage of the United Kingdom

== Businesses ==
- Braithwaite & Co., a wholly owned subsidiary of Indian Railways
- Braithwaite, Burn & Jessop Construction Company, a Public Sector Undertaking (PSU) of the Government of India

== Other uses ==
- HMS Braithwaite, a Royal Navy Captain-class frigate in World War II

== See also ==
- Bredtvet, a suburb of Oslo, Norway, with the same meaning
