= Roderick Braithwaite =

New Zealand politician

24th Mayor of Hamilton
- In office 1953–1959
- Preceded by: Harold Caro
- Succeeded by: Denis Rogers

Personal details
- Born: Roderick Alastair Macdonnell Braithwaite; 13 August 1901 Dunedin, New Zealand
- Died: 3 April 1963 (aged 61) Hamilton, New Zealand
- Spouse: Nora Kathleen Arey (m. 1932)
- Children: David Braithwaite
- Parent: Joseph Braithwaite (father)
- Relatives: John Braithwaite (brother); Rewi Braithwaite (brother); Warwick Braithwaite (brother); Nicholas Braithwaite (nephew); Rodric Braithwaite (nephew)

Roderick Alastair Macdonnell Braithwaite MBE, (13 August 1901 – 3 April 1963) was a New Zealand politician. He was mayor of Hamilton from 1953 to 1959.

== Early life and family ==
Braithwaite was born in Dunedin on 13 August 1901, one of the youngest sons of Joseph Braithwaite, bookseller and later mayor of Dunedin, and his wife, Mary Ann Braithwaite (née Bellett). He was one of at least 16 and as many as 22 children, born to the couple.

His brothers included John Braithwaite, who was convicted and executed for mutiny during World War I and pardoned by the New Zealand government in 2000; Rewi Braithwaite, who played in New Zealand's first official international soccer match, against Australia in 1922; and Warwick Braithwaite, who became an orchestral conductor.

Braithwaite married Nora Kathleen Arey, the daughter of bookseller William Ewbank Arey, on 21 June 1932.

== Mayoralty ==
Braithwaite served two terms as mayor of Hamilton, from 1953 to 1959. He called the first public meeting that led to the establishment of the Waikato Savings Bank in 1958, and served as the first chair of its board of trustees.

== Death and legacy ==
Braithwaite died on 3 April 1963, and was buried at Hamilton Park Cemetery. His widow, Kathleen Braithwaite, served as a Hamilton city councillor between 1962 and 1974, including a period as deputy mayor, and was appointed a Member of the Order of the British Empire for services to the community in the 1963 Queen's Birthday Honours. Their son, David Braithwaite, unsuccessfully stood for the Hamilton mayoralty in 1998, but was elected to that office in 2001. He was defeated in his bid for re-election in 2004.

Political offices
Preceded by Harold Caro	Mayor of Hamilton; 1953–1959	Succeeded by Denis Rogers
