= James Edward Edmonds =

British Army general (1861–1956)

Brigadier-General Sir James Edward Edmonds CB CMG
- Born: 25 December 1861; London, England
- Died: 2 August 1956 (aged 94); Sherborne, England
- Military career
- Allegiance: United Kingdom
- Branch: British Army
- Rank: Brigadier-General
- Nickname: Archimedes
- Commands: Secret Service Bureau; Military Branch, Historical Section, Committee of Imperial Defence
- Conflicts: Second Boer War; Russo-Japanese War; First World War
- Awards: Knight Bachelor; Companion of the Order of the Bath; Companion of the Order of St Michael and St George; Mentioned in Despatches

Brigadier-General Sir James Edward Edmonds, CB, CMG (25 December 1861 – 2 August 1956) was an officer of the Royal Engineers in the late-Victorian era British Army who worked in the Intelligence Division, took part in the creation of the forerunner of MI5 and promoted several spy scares.

In 1911, Edmonds returned to soldiering as the chief of staff of the 4th Division, despite being advised that it was a bad career move. In the manoeuvres of 1912, with the 3rd Division, the 4th Division took part in the defeat of I Corps, commanded by Douglas Haig and the only permanent corps headquarters in the army. The 4th Division training emphasised the retreat despite such tactics being barred by the War Office. When the First World War began, Edmonds thought that the division was well trained but lacking much of the equipment provided to German divisions.

The 4th Division fought at the Battle of Le Cateau on 26 August and then participated in the Great Retreat, an ordeal which Edmonds, 53 years old, found most trying, buoyed up only by his pre-war training and belief that it would end in a counter-offensive. Edmonds found that once there was time to rest, that he could not and was transferred to GHQ, the headquarters of the British Expeditionary Force, where he feared being sent home. Edmonds spent the rest of the war at GHQ and in 1918 was made deputy engineer-in-chief. Edmonds retired from the army in 1919 with the honorary rank of Brigadier-General.

Edmonds became the Director of the Military Branch of the Historical Section of the Committee of Imperial Defence on 1 April 1919 and was responsible for the post-war compilation of the 28-volume Military Operations section of the History of the Great War. Edmonds wrote eleven of the fourteen volumes titled Military Operations, France and Belgium, dealing with the Western Front. "Military Operations: Italy 1915–1919", the final volume of the series, was published in 1949, just after Edmonds retired. Edmonds spent his retirement at Brecon House, Long Street, Sherborne, Dorset, where he died on 2 August 1956.

== Early life and education ==
James Edward Edmonds was born in Baker Street, London, on 25 December 1861 to James Edmonds, a master jeweller and his wife Frances Amelia Bowler, a family that could trace its ancestry to Fowey in Cornwall. Edmonds was educated as a day boy at King's College School, accommodated in a wing of Somerset House. Edmonds claimed that his father taught him languages at breakfast, to the extent that he was familiar with German, French, Italian and Russian. Edmonds did not learn Latin or Greek at school but studied science and geology. Edmonds visited France when he was eight and saw Napoleon III, then returned two years later, soon after the end of the Franco-Prussian War (1870–1871). In his unpublished Memoirs, Edmonds wrote that he was surprised to see that the Arc de Triomphe had not been demolished and that he became sceptical of the reports of war correspondents for the rest of his life.

While Edmonds was in Amiens, still under German occupation, a Bavarian officer said "Ve haf beat de Franzmen, you vill be next" (sic). This determined Edmonds's father to teach both his sons German and to put them into the army. Edmonds's teachers encouraged him to study maths at Cambridge but when one of his friends passed third in the entrance exam to the Royal Military Academy, Woolwich (RMA Woolwich), Edmonds applied. In July 1879 Edmonds took the RMA Woolwich entrance exam, passed first and was accepted for a place. At the end of the course Edmonds achieved the highest marks that instructors could remember, and was awarded the Pollock Gold Medal for Efficiency and prizes for mathematics, mechanics, fortification, geometrical drawing, military history, drills and exercises and exemplary conduct. Edmonds won the Sword of Honour for the Best Gentleman Cadet and was mentioned by the commander-in-chief of the Army, Prince George, Duke of Cambridge.

== Military career ==
=== Royal Engineers ===
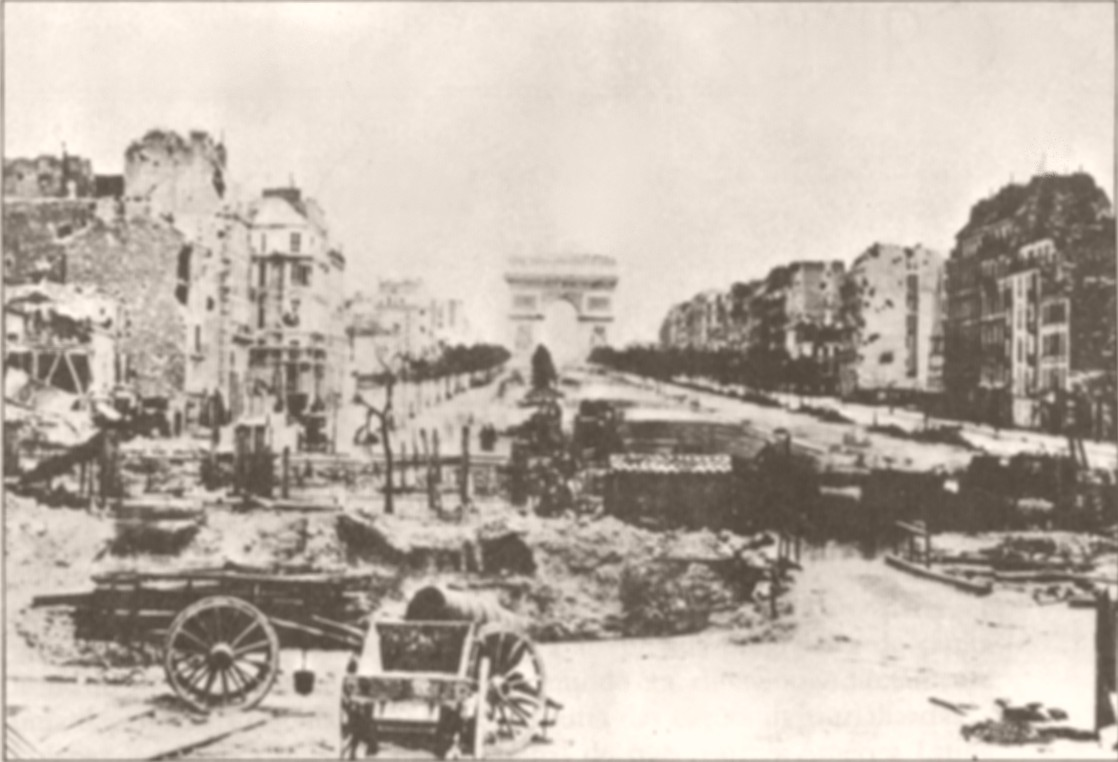
Paris in 1871 after the suppression of the Commune, showing an intact Arc de Triomphe

Edmonds was commissioned into the Corps of Royal Engineers on 22 July 1881. Edmonds spent four years based in Chatham and a year in Malta studying submarine mining, a matter which the Royal Navy could not be expected to undertake. Edmonds's intellect was recognised with the nickname Archimedes. After returning from Malta, Edmonds was posted to Hong Kong with two companies of engineers to garrison the colony after a Russian invasion scare. The 33rd Engineer Company, in which Edmonds served, was one of those chosen. When the orders were received the company commander went sick and his deputy requested to be excused as his wife was pregnant. The two companies reached Hong Kong, one with eight men and the other about thirty; the absentees were either ill, invalid or on attachment and had missed the boat.

Edmonds found that rocky outcrops just below the surface in Hong Kong harbour had not been charted and were a danger to shipping, occasionally the cause of serious accidents. Edmonds organised their removal by trailing a rail between two rowing boats and lowering a diver to place an explosive charge on the top. The posting was uneventful; in 1888 Edmonds returned to Chatham after three months' sick leave in Japan and sojourns US and Canada, to join the 38th Mining Company as Assistant Instructor. Apparently Edmonds's main duty was to play golf with the chief instructor in the afternoons. Edmonds was promoted to captain in January 1890 and returned to the RMA Woolwich as an instructor in fortification. During his six years as an instructor Edmonds spent his long vacations abroad learning Russian and other languages.

=== Staff College ===
In 1895 Edmonds took the entrance exam for the Staff College, Camberley and passed first again; during the year he married Hilda Margaret Ion (died 1921), daughter of the Rev. Matthew Wood; they had one daughter. Twenty-four candidates were chosen by application and eight men with near misses in the examinations could enter by nomination, one of whom was Douglas Haig. Edmonds felt intellectually superior to his peers and wrote later that only George Macdonogh was an exception, a man who could also understand some of the more recondite subjects, like the decoding of cyphers. In his Memoirs, Edmonds wrote that he was often paired with Haig because he was good with detail and Haig a generalist. (Note: In 2003 Andrew Green wrote that information from Edmonds's Memoirs should be treated with caution. In his Memoirs, Edmonds wrote that at first Edmonds and others found Haig to be "abrupt and unsympathetic" but that he "worked harder than everyone else", stayed in the mess for meals and had only one friend, Arthur Blair. At Sandhurst, Haig has also been judged to be "taciturn, aloof and ambitious".) Edmonds passed out in 1899 at the top of his class, one of the most successful and popular students of the era, noted for his conversation which had become even more interesting and appreciated by, amongst others, Douglas Haig, Aylmer Haldane and Edmund Allenby. Edmonds wrote that Allenby was a blockhead, which Cyril Falls later called "an error typical of Edmonds's worst side".

Edmonds, promoted to major in May 1899, overheard Colonel George Henderson predict that Haig would become commander in chief. (Note: Along with Haig, who became commander-in-chief (C-in-C) of the British Expeditionary Force (BEF) in December 1915, Allenby who later commanded the Third Army of the BEF at the Battle of Arras and led the Mediterranean Expeditionary Force in the Sinai and Palestine campaign from 1917 to 1918 and William Robertson, who became Chief of the Imperial General Staff in 1916.) While at the college, Edmonds co-wrote with his brother in law, W. Birkbeck Wood, "The History of the Civil War in the United States 1861–1865" (1905). The book was well received by reviewers who wrote that the book would be appealing to soldiers and to students of history alike. The book was full of statistical information, although the reviewer in the Times Literary Supplement thought that in this, the authors had gone a little too far. The book gave prominence to novel aspects of the war including the use of cavalry, battles of attrition and the turning of volunteers into disciplined soldiers. The book was in print for thirty years and by 1936 was in its fourth edition and was in use at West Point.

=== The Intelligence Division ===
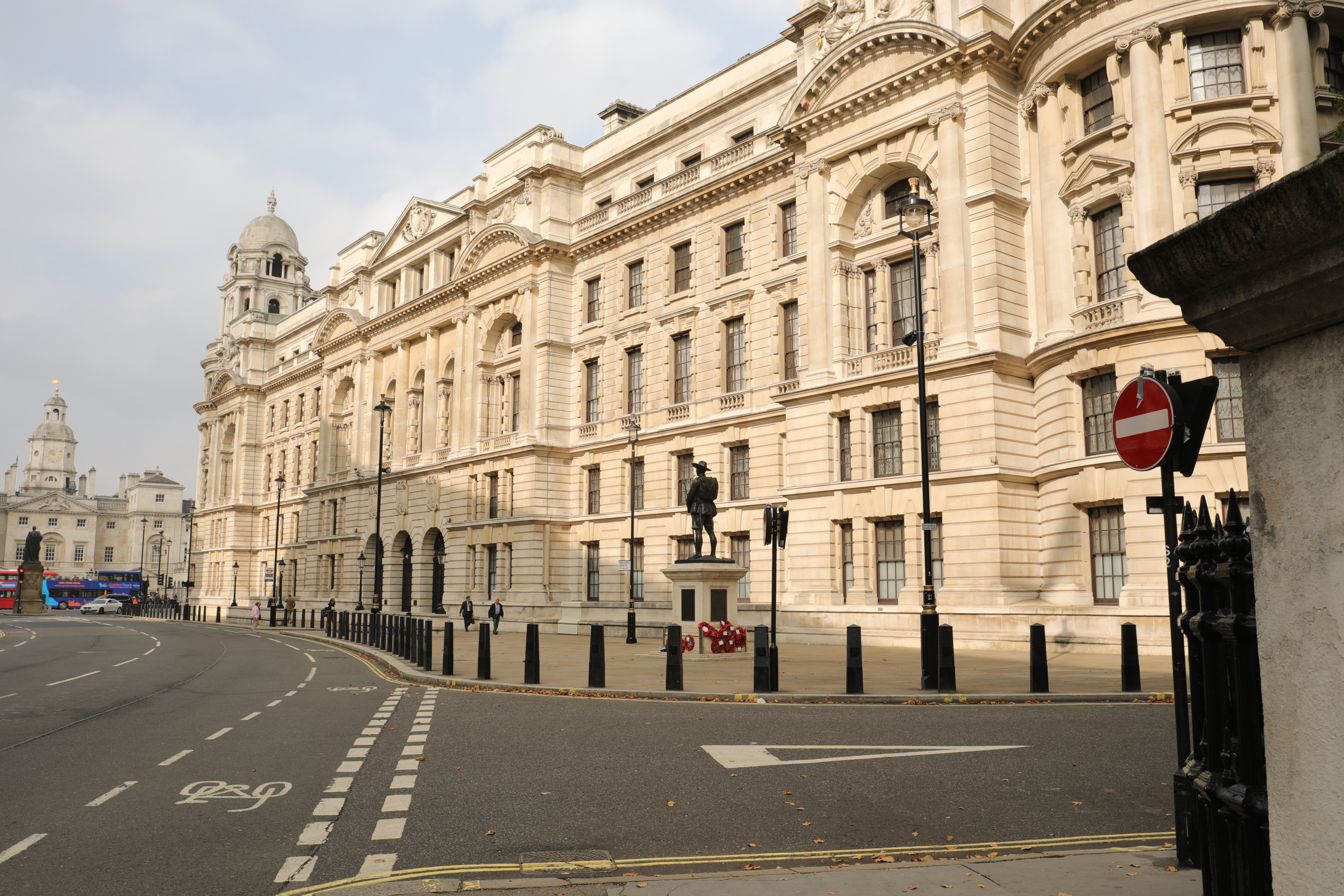
The War Office building, completed in 1906

Edmonds was offered a post in the Intelligence Division of the General Staff, commanded by Major-General John Ardagh in October 1899, ten days after the beginning of the Second Boer War (1899–1902). Edmonds became head of the Special Duties Section of the War Office (Section H) which was established soon after the outbreak of the war. Section H censored cable communications, spied on suspected agents, press correspondents and monitored matters of international law. Edmonds has a staff of one officer and a retired police detective with a budget of £200. The section later took on counter-intelligence and secret service work which entailed the dispatch of a small number of officers to South Africa to study topography, communications and Boer troop movements. The temporary Secret Section 13 (A), with a staff of three, kept watch on messages to South Africa and exports of ammunition. The section managed to intercept Dutch correspondence to South Africa but was prevented from accepting the offer by the captain of a rugby team to vandalise the London offices of a pro-Boer agent.

In 1901 Ardagh and Edmonds went to South Africa, at the request of the Foreign Office, to advise Lord Kitchener on questions of international law. From 1902–1904 Edmonds worked for Lord Milner on the establishment of peace. (Note: In Edmonds's absence Colonel James Trotter had worked on a new cypher for the War Office, training officers to use cyphers and break codes. At the end of the war, the Director General of Mobilisation and Military Intelligence, Major-General William Nicholson, lobbied to keep Secret Section 13 (A) but a committee of 1903 chaired by Lord Hardwicke refused this because it was felt to be necessary only in time of war, despite continental governments taking a different view. The section as disbanded and Section H renamed the Special Duties Section (MO3) in 1904 and left it to drift.) After six years abroad, Edmonds, now a major, returned to England in 1906 and took over MO3, which in 1907 was renamed MO5 and until 1910 concentrated on counter-espionage, intelligence gathering and cryptography. Apart from Edmonds the staff consisted of another major, who spent his time cultivating a parliamentary constituency, where he was elected as a Conservative MP three years later. Edmonds found that the MO3 files contained matters pertaining to the Boer War, a few items about France and Russia but nothing about Germany, which was to become Edmonds's concern with the diplomatic settlements with France (Entente Cordiale [1904]) and the Anglo-Russian Convention of 1907. Edmonds devised a code called double Playfair for communications with the Japanese and for British forces engaged in field operations. Edmonds drew up a list of experts in code-breaking and trained junior officers in cypher methods to create a reserve for times of war. Edmonds attempted to establish intelligence gathering by the British as an equivalent of the efforts being made by the French and Germans, who had been spying and counter-spying on each other since before the Franco-Prussian War. Edmonds took the view that in a modern war, old methods would be inadequate and in 1908 gave a lecture on tactical intelligence which compared the tasks of a field officer in a small war to that of their continental equivalents. In a European war, the British Army would need

...far greater vigilance, far closer watching of the enemy, far greater secrecy than war [against] the foes we have been accustomed to meet.

Field officers would find it far harder to get topographical data in Germany during hostilities and would have to rely on information gained during peace. In the Russo-Japanese War (1904–1905) the Japanese had the benefit of agents placed in Russia before the war, which contributed to the Japanese victory. Edmonds advocated intelligence operations in Germany before a war but his efforts were hampered by the usual lack of money and War Office inexperience, whose early efforts were embarrassing failures. Edmonds had most success in changing the Security Service, despite his reasons coming from a fantasy. The growing Anglo-German antagonism had led to a fashion for alarmist literature about German spies and invasion scares, several written by William Le Queux, one of Edmonds's friends. There were some German agents in Britain watching ports and dockyards but no centrally organised system of espionage; Germany was far more interested in France and Russia. Gustav Steinhauer of German naval intelligence (Nachrichten-Abteilung N) ran "poorly paid and clumsy agents".

==== Invasion scares ====
Photograph of Le Queux

Le Queux wrote The Invasion of 1910 in 1906, serialised in the Daily Mail and then published in 17 languages, selling more than a million copies. In 1907 The Morning Post splashed a story purporting that 90,000 German reservists and spies, with arms caches, were at large in Britain. Invasion scares whipped up public anxiety when the Germans accelerated their dreadnought building plans. (Note: When HMS Dreadnought had gone into service in 1906, it had made all other battleships obsolete, giving foreign navies the chance to catch up with the British.) The British government set up a sub-committee of the Committee of Imperial Defence (CID) in 1907 to look into the possibility of a German invasion, which met 16 times from November 1907 to July 1908 and debunked the invasion scares. The Director of Military Operations, Major-General Sir Spencer Ewart did have to admit that the counter-intelligence system was inadequate and began a review. In October 1908 a new Official Secrets Act was drafted to allow arrests and searches without warrant, the registration of aliens (foreigners), the use of paid agents in Britain to unmask foreign spies and copying the German system instituted in 1866, in which a police or private detective under an intelligence officer ran spies abroad. Without peacetime preparations, Britain would enter a war "fatally handicapped".

Edmonds was suspicious of German intentions because of a widespread assumption that the German victory in the Franco-Prussian War had been helped by its military intelligence effort and the ineptitude of French counter-intelligence. MO5 judged that German army reservists resident in France and the consular service had sent useful information to Germany. MO5 Got hold of a copy of the 1894 edition of "Felddienstordnung" the German Army Field Manual which required the use of spies by every command. In the 1890s, Edmonds had got to know several German intelligence officers, who had told him that a new department had been established in 1901 for naval intelligence gathering about Britain, the Nachrichten Abteilung N but this was assumed to be part of military intelligence, Sektion IIIb.

Several German friends told Edmonds that they had been approached by the German Imperial Admiralty (Kaiserliche Admiralität) to report on the movements of warships, observe dockyards, arsenals, aircraft and munitions factories. In 1909 Le Queux published "Spies of the Kaiser" in which London and the east coast were full of German spies disguised as barbers, waiters and tourists. (Note: Fred Jane, founder of the eponymous warship reference books, kidnapped a German resident of Portsmouth and dumped him at the Duke of Bedford's animal park at Woburn Abbey to publicise the threat.) The denunciation of alleged spies increased and the cases were passed on to Edmonds who began to classify German visitors according to their proximity to important buildings and other structures, those who entertained parties of visiting Germans or tradesmen and photographers who lived near dockyards and ports. Richard Haldane, the Secretary of State for War (1905–1912), refused to credit the existence of a German spy network and few other members of the government took it seriously. Even Helmuth von Moltke the Younger, the Chief of the Great German General Staff (1906–1914) claimed that an invasion might be feasible but that supplying a landing force or re-embarking it would be impossible.

In February 1909 Edmonds was promoted to brevet colonel and that year told Captain Vernon Kell, his deputy during his time in the Far East, that the commander of a German landing in East Anglia would be better informed than a British general. Haldane was persuaded to set up another CID sub-committee to inquire about foreign espionage, at which Edmonds gave evidence. Viscount Esher said that Edmonds was

...a silly witness from the War Office [who saw] rats everywhere – behind every arras.

but Haldane was more persuaded. The existing intelligence system could not quantify German spying or stop it. The sub-committee recommended that a secret service bureau be established and in August 1909 the new agency was set up within MO5. Edmonds appointed Kell to run the agency. The government also created controls to monitor and limit the freedom of movement of aliens and increased powers under the Official Secrets Act to give more powers to the police against spies. After studying continental powers, the Metropolitan Police gained more powers of arrest and search. A conviction could be obtained on the evidence of suspicious behaviour and the burden of proof was placed on the accused. (Note: When war was declared on 4 August 1914, all but one person believed by Edmonds and Kell to be agents were arrested.) Edmonds, who in October 1909 succeeded Brigadier General Aylmer Haldane as a GSO1 at the War Office, was promoted in January 1910 to colonel and left MO5 later that year. He had established a Secret Service section from a ramshackle, under-funded and poorly organised group of temporary, part-time and amateur agents, that resembled a modern intelligence gathering and counter-intelligence organisation. Despite being taken in by sensational tales of mass spying, Edmonds had laid the foundations of MI5 and MI6.

== Return to soldiering ==
After seven years in intelligence, Edmonds wanted a change and did not want to be subordinate to Brigadier-General Henry Wilson, the new DMO, towards whom Edmonds harboured a certain enmity. Edmonds was offered the posts of commandant of the School of Military Engineering or general staff officer, grade 1 (GSO I, the divisional chief of staff) of the 4th Division (Major-General Thomas Snow). Edmonds joined the 4th Division on 1 March 1911, taking over from Colonel Willoughby Gwatkin, despite being told that it was a bad career move to leave the War Office. Edmonds had gone on leave for three months before the transfer, during which he had translated French and Russian works on battlefield engineering. Snow, a somewhat irascible man, quickly gained confidence in Edmonds and told him, "I provide the ginger and you provide the brains". The division trained and in the corps manoeuvres of 1912, the 3rd Division and the 4th Division defeated I Corps which was under the command of Douglas Haig. An important part of the divisional training was the retreat, despite this being banned by the War Office. On the eve of the war, Edmonds thought that his division was prepared but ill-equipped compared to the items he had seen in use in the German Army, when he attended the manoeuvres of 1908. The Germans had machine-guns, flare pistols, trench mortars, ambulances, artillery telephones and field kitchens. The 4th Division was based at Great Yarmouth in August 1914, ready to repel a German invasion attempt.

== First World War ==
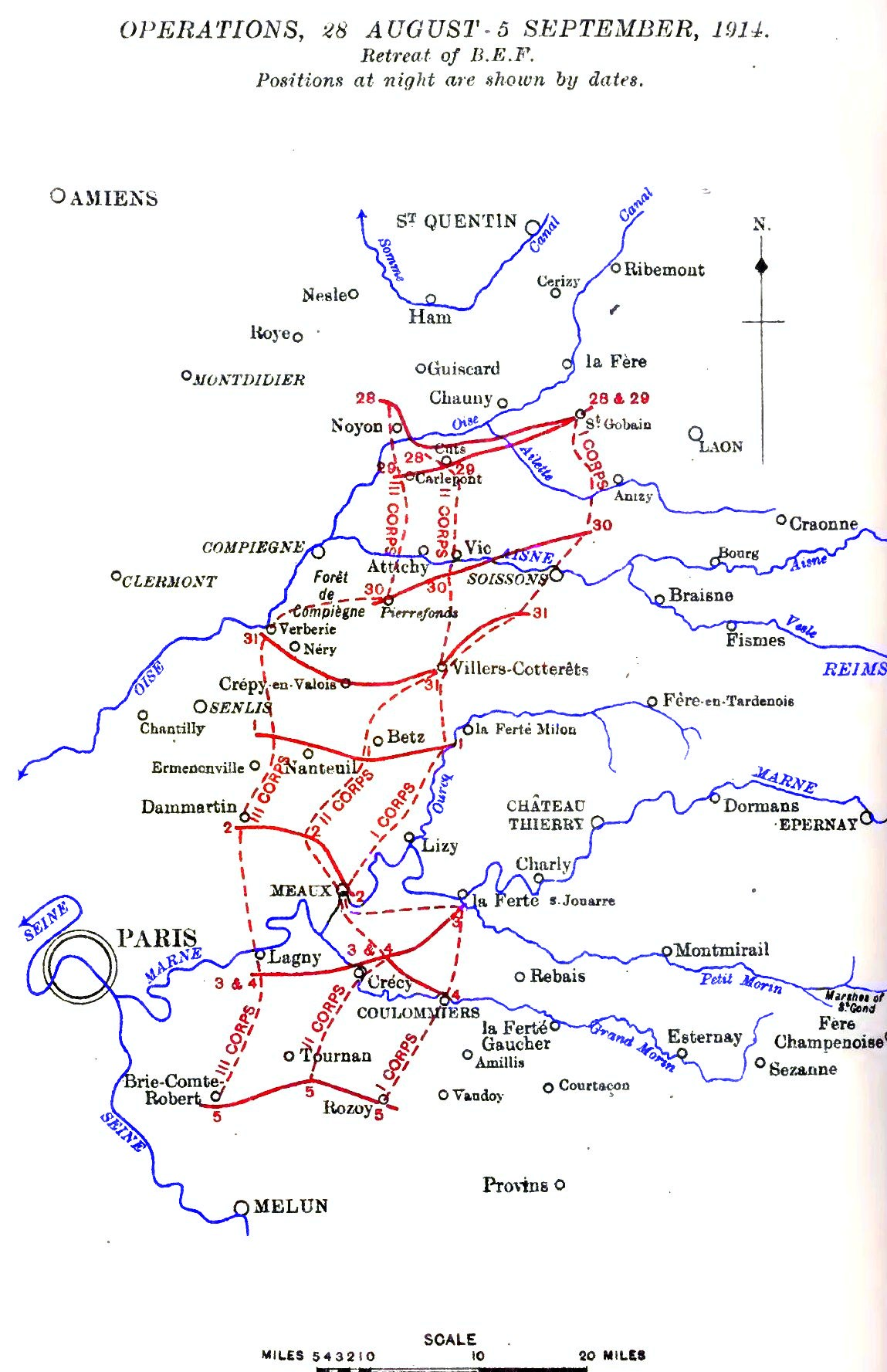
Map of BEF operations, 28 August – 5 September

The 4th Division disembarked at Le Havre on 24 August and joined the Expeditionary Force in time for the Battle of Le Cateau on 26 August. The division was ordered to hold high ground near Solesmes to assist the retirement of II Corps (Lieutenant-General Horace Smith-Dorrien) and then to move to the left flank of II Corps at Le Cateau. After a day of battle, the 4th Division reached Le Cateau in soaking rain, tired and hungry. Smith-Dorrien judged that a retreat on the morrow would be impossible; the corps would fight on 26 August and then slip away. At 6:00 a.m. Edmonds narrowly missed being hit by shrapnel-fire during the battle and in his Memoirs wrote that the night of 26/27 August was the most miserable in his life.

Edmonds rode at the head of the 4th Division column in another downpour, not being able to get down from his horse to check his map, because he would be unable to mount it again. At midnight the column stopped for four hours and then carried on the Great Retreat that lasted for ten days. At the age of 53, Edmonds had to get by on about three hours sleep a night. Food was short and by the time that Edmonds had finished his duties each night, he found that most of the remainder of the food laid out for the officers had been eaten by a corpulent Veterinary Officer. Edmonds wrote that he could not believe that a man so tired and hungry could stay alive. Edmonds was able to keep going because of the pre-war training of the 4th Division in retreats and the anticipation that it would end by a counter-attack, the order for which came on 5 September.

Once able to rest, Edmonds found sleep impossible, had an aching jaw, was unable to concentrate when trying to read a map and found that everything looked black or grey. The engineer-in-chief asked for him at General headquarters (GHQ) of the British Expeditionary Force (BEF). Edmonds was relieved not to be sent home because of his age and he stayed at GHQ for the rest of the war, in 1918 becoming deputy engineer-in-chief. He was consulted by Haig, became a mentor of the General Staff and all branches of the engineers, which gave him greater knowledge of transport problems than the supply staffs. At first Edmonds assisted Major Ernest Swinton who had been sent out by the Secretary of State for War, Lord Kitchener (1914–1916) as a war correspondent, in the absence of news reporters, who had been barred from the front. Edmonds had a fairly quiet war, coming under a fire a few times and once being billeted in a house across from one that was hit by a bomb, killing the two occupants. In 1919 Edmonds retired from the army and was given the honorary rank of brigadier-general.

== Post-war career ==
=== "History of the Great War" ===
Military Operations, France and Belgium, 1914 (1922)

"History of the Great War" is an abbreviation of The History of the Great War Based on Official Documents by Direction of the Committee of Imperial Defence (sometimes called the British Official History). A formal decision to write an official history was taken in a Cabinet meeting on 26 August 1915, when Maurice Hankey (1877–1963) the Secretary of the Committee of Imperial Defence and of the War Council, advocated a series of histories to provide

...a popular and authoritative guide for the general reader; for the purposes of professional reference and education [and to provide] an antidote to the usual unofficial histories which besides being generally inaccurate, habitually attribute all naval and military failures to the ineptitude of the Government.

Field Marshal Herbert Kitchener (1850–1916) the Secretary of State for War wanted work begun on a single-volume popular history, to be published soon after the war. Kitchener hoped to maintain public interest in the main series and put the case of the government at the same time as accounts by participants and popular authors. The Treasury gave way and agreed to finance an official history series and popular single-volume works, written by civilian authors to ensure public appeal. Sir John Fortescue (1859–1933) was chosen as the author of the army volume. Work on the military histories in 1919 was hampered by paucity of resources and bad management, until Edmonds who had joined the Historical Section (Military Branch) in February 1919, was appointed Director on 1 April. Edmonds found documents in un-catalogued bundles on the floor, from which historians had abstracted items and not replaced them.

The Fortescue volume was to have covered the war but he wrote so slowly that it was decided to end his volume at May 1915 and only cover France. Edmonds also came to doubt the quality of the work, judging Fortescue to be ignorant of the workings of a contemporary army, apparently being 200 years behind the times; Fortescue had excluded dates and times and used obsolete language; he agreed to revise his draft but then took no notice. His second draft was said to be confused, containing nothing about the general situation and hardly referring to the Germans. Senior officers were ridiculed, the government blamed for not stopping the war and the French effort was "slurred over in less than one typewritten page". Edmonds blamed Fortescue for lack of interest, lethargy and ignoring the records made available, bungling the chance to write an exciting story of the BEF by delivering a patchwork of unit diaries. At the end of the year, Edmonds decided to rewrite the work; Fortescue was sacked and Edmonds even wanted him to be made to pay back his salary. (Note: In 1992, John Hussey wrote an essay entitled "John Fortescue, James Edmonds and the History of the Great War: A case of 'Ritual Murder'?" which was republished by Robin Higham in "The Writing of Official Military History" (1999). Hussey discussed criticism of Edmonds by Denis Winter in "Haig's Command: A Reassessment" (1991) that Edmonds had connived to remove Fortescue to get control over the writing of the official history. Hussey wrote that in 1919, Christopher Atkinson, one of Fortescue's colleagues, had criticised his draft text and that Edmonds had dismissed it. According to the knowledge available to Fortescue at the time he wrote the draft, Edmonds might have been unfair but that some of Edmonds's comments were echoes of those of Lord Esher more than a year earlier and E. Y. Daniel had concurred with Edmonds.) Edmonds decided that an account must be enhanced by statements, private records of officers and by German material, to counter "garbled" accounts by the likes of Arthur Conan Doyle and John Buchan. Soundings with publishers and authors convinced Edmonds that a work based on dispatches would fail to engage the public. An educational work needed a foundation on which to base teaching and a work must be readable enough for the public to buy, be a credible educational work for the military student and rebut inaccurate commercial accounts by civilian authors.

Edmonds submitted an annual report and meetings considered costs and the progress of publication, the number of volumes, their scope and size. On rare occasions the committee made a ruling on content after complaints by a department; in 1928, the War Office strenuously objected to some of the content of the first Gallipoli volume by C. F. Aspinall-Oglander. Money determined the speed of publication, the size and number of volumes and the choice of author. Edmonds preferring to employ officers on half-pay or retired on £500 per year, about half the price of a civilian author; officers were usually willing to work longer hours and do unpaid work. The Treasury managed to obtain the removal of Lieutenant-General Launcelot Kiggell, Chief of the General Staff of the British Armies in France from late 1915 to early 1918 from writing 1918 Part I and Edmonds agreed, because his work was "lacking in colour and atmosphere". The price of the early volumes was set at 21 Shillings (21s) and another 21s for accompanying map cases but this was considered too costly for professional officers. In 1923, the price was cut to 12s 6d but this left no surplus for advertising and no incentive for booksellers to display them prominently; publishers also set a maximum number of pages per volume, a constraint that led the Committee for Control in 1924 to advise a price increase to 15s. In March 1933, Edmonds showed copies of French, German and Austrian histories to demonstrate their "elaborate and voluminous" nature. Several volumes were financed by interested departments but Edmonds retained supervision and maintained the same editorial control as for the other volumes.

Parsimony affected the organisation of the Historical Section and the speed at which it could publish. The premises were cramped, visits to battlefields and the number of historians and administrators were limited and in 1922, Edmonds threatened to resign if denied more help. Daniel and Edmonds had only three or four full-time officers, who had to write the volumes, prepare them for publication, maintain the library, study prisoner of war (POW) records and foreign official and non-official publications in their native language and provide help for the War Office, War Graves Commission, Staff College, educational establishments and government departments. The section had about 2,000 visitors a year to its cramped offices in Cavendish Square, until it moved to the Audit Office in 1922. By 1924, Edmonds had five administrators and eight writers, when the French and German equivalents had about 130 each. The British staff were also underpaid, A. F. Becke being refused a salary increase from £500 per annum. Edmonds got the money instead, from £560 to £800 per annum and then £1,000 per annum in 1924, when he was writing most of the histories, managing the section and working a seven-day-week for three months, then taking ten days off (Edmonds worked like this for much of the 29 years of the project). A 1927 proposal for Cyril Falls (1888–1971) to visit Mesopotamia for £200 was vetoed by the Treasury but £50 was allowed for Aspinall-Oglander to visit Gallipoli.

==== Official documents ====
The British Expeditionary Forces were the largest army the British state had raised and by 1924 it had generated more than 25 million documents, which Edmonds thought would take nine years to sort. Edmonds had found the papers in heaps in the floor and apparently summarily sacked the Chief Clerk for refusing to climb a ladder to retrieve a bundle. Edmonds complained that Atkinson, his predecessor, had let historians plunder the packets of documents and not return items and claimed that it took until June 1923 to catalogue the records. The first draft of a volume was prepared by a "narrator", who sorted, read and analysed the documents. The result was revised by the "historian" who added comments and a conclusion. The draft was then sent to participants down to battalion commanders, other senior military officers, politicians and government departments. The draft for 1916 Part I (including the First Day on the Somme) was sent to 1,000 officers who had sent 1,470 replies by 1931. Comments on the first chapter created a pile 5 ft (1.5 m) high and Edmonds complained that his staff was insufficient, considering that he had briefed them that all names, initials, ranks and numbers had to be checked and then cross-checked with the French and German accounts; lack of staff slowed production. In 1922, Edmonds had calculated that it would take twenty years to write ten volumes, a feat that the French had achieved in three years. It took 21 years (excluding 1939–1945) to produce 14 Western Front volumes and 15 more on other theatres.

==== Content ====
Edmonds had great influence on the literary and academic integrity of the work. In the first volume, published in 1922, Edmonds wrote in the preface, that "no deviation from the truth nor misrepresentation will be found in the official histories on which my name appeared". Edmonds' claim has been challenged ever since, leading to a common assumption that the work is vapid at best and at worst fraudulent, a partial, misleading and exculpatory account of the military establishment. In 1934, Liddell Hart questioned the integrity of the writers, calling 1918 Part I "patriotic" and "parochial". Norman Brook, one of the official historians, claimed in 1945, that Edmonds could not be trusted to revise 1916 Part I, because he had succumbed to the temptation to interpolate his views. In 1976, John Keegan (1934–2012) wrote

...the compilers of the British Official History of the First World War have achieved the remarkable feat of writing an exhaustive account of one of the world's greatest tragedies without any display of emotion at all.

In 1985, David French wrote that Edmonds "...has a private purpose to conceal the truth about the high command in France from the lay public...." and that Edmonds had become concerned to rebut claims by politicians that Haig wasted lives on futile offensives; Edmonds's subjects were heroes and beyond criticism. Tim Travers wrote that Edmonds eschewed direct criticism of senior officers, was obliged to Haig and protected his reputation, rigged facts and drew false conclusions in the volumes on the Somme (1916 Part I), Passchendaele (1917 Part II) and 1918 Part I. In 1996, Paddy Griffith (1947–2010) called it an

...encyclopaedic work, transparently individualistic in tone, lucidly organised, wide in scope and by far the best book on the Western Front.

Griffith called the quantity of writing on the Great War "prodigious" and that despite Edmonds being unstable, insecure and having never held a field appointment, he was conscientious, intelligent and rarely allowed his devious and opinionated nature to distort his work on the official history.

Edmonds determined the presentation of information, which imposed constraints on the authors. All but implied criticism was to be avoided and the author was to resist the temptation to be "wise after the event". Disclosure of facts about opponents was to be kept to small-type footnotes or in notes at the end of chapters, because introducing facts not known at the time was hindsight, which was unfair and un-scholarly. A conclusion could be written for reflection and comment but not for fault finding. For Edmonds, the constraints were necessary for some facts innocuously to be shown to the lay reader, yet be significant to experts reading between the lines. Henry Stacke, the first author of Military Operations: East Africa, Volume I died and Charles Horden, his replacement, wrote that Stacke had been frustrated by being obliged to

...gloss over (to put it mildly) mistakes and shortcomings to so great an extent as in my opinion to nullify the value of the work as history. Like him I have sedulously tried to avoid wounding any susceptibilities. But I have not shrunk from criticisms where they seemed necessary for the purpose either of impartial record or military study.... I have striven to say only enough to enable an intelligent reader to form his own judgement.

— (1938)

The avoidance of hindsight was consistent with the education Edmonds received at the Staff College on the teaching of Carl von Clausewitz (1780–1831), that the critic must only use the information available to a commander and his motives, rather than introduce matters that the commander did not and could not know. Using knowledge after the event could show arrogance and a lack of critical judgement. In writing the first Gallipoli volume (1929), Cecil Aspinall-Oglander ignored the convention and on the draft copy, Edmonds called his account biased and lacking in the objective judgement necessary for an official historian. When Aspinall-Oglander refused to revise his text, Edmonds criticised him for

...lacking critical judgement, of arrogant sarcasm and of producing a valueless work which he would one day come to regret.

a complaint which was occasionally levelled at Edmonds by the War Office and by several of the participants in the war. Despite the constraints that Edmonds imposed on the form of the official histories, Andrew Green called his accounts accurate and comprehensive. Edmonds's correspondence with Basil Liddell Hart shows that Hart valued the official history and offered constructive criticism. Green wrote that when David French called the work "official but not history", he had used Hart's words out of context, Liddell Hart meaning that by leaving potentially controversial details to be read between the lines, Edmonds created the risk that later historians might use the phrase to describe the volumes.

== Later years ==
Edmonds was knighted in the 1928 Birthday Honours. In 1939 Daniel was 75, Edmonds was 79 and the government again considered terminating the writing of the official history, given that the combined age of the two most senior members was more than 150. Edward Bridges, the Secretary to the Cabinet, told Edmonds that he would be retained only until the completion of the volume he was working on and that Daniel should retire that summer. Daniel was asked to explain the value of the histories to the Treasury and repeated much of what he had written in 1919 and 1922, that a commercial publisher could not have the same access to the senior participants and would forfeit the chance to inform the public and educate military officers, when six volumes of Military Operations France and Belgium remained to be written. The government was placated and writing continued but Daniel retired in July 1939 and Edmonds took on his duties as Secretary of the Historical Section. The last Western Front volume, Military Operations France and Belgium 1917 ** (Third Ypres) was published in 1948. Edmonds retired in July, just before the publication of Military Operations Italy 1915–1919. (Note: On 15 November 1939, shortly after the outbreak of war, the Historical Section moved to Lytham St Annes in Lancashire where it stayed until April 1942, then moved to the National Library of Wales in Aberystwyth.) Edmonds spent his retirement at Brecon House, Long Street, Sherborne, Dorset, where he died on 2 August 1956.

== Bibliography ==
Books

- Andrew, C. (2009). Defend the Realm – The Authorized History of MI5 (1st US ed.). New York: Borzoi Books (Alfred Knopf). ISBN 978-0-307-26363-6. (First published as The Defence of the Realm: The Authorized History of MI5, Allen Lane, London, 2009. ISBN 978-0-7139-9885-6)
- Edmonds, J. E. (1987) [1944]. The Occupation of the Rhineland, 1918–1929 (For Official Use Only). History of the Great War Based on Official Documents by Direction of the Historical Section of the Committee of Imperial Defence (Imperial War Museum facsimile ed.). London: HMSO. ISBN 978-0-11-290454-0.
  - Bayliss, G. M. Introduction. In Edmonds (1987).
- Green, A. (2003). Writing the Great War: Sir James Edmonds and the Official Histories 1915–1948. London: Frank Cass. ISBN 978-0-7146-8430-7.
- Griffith, P. (1996). Battle Tactics of the Western Front: The British Army's Art of Attack 1916–1918. London: Yale. ISBN 978-0-300-06663-0.
- Higham, Robin, ed. (1999). The Writing of Official Military History. Contributions in Military Studies (No. 171). Westport, CT: Greenwood Press. ISBN 0-313-30863-2.
  - Hussey, J. "John Fortescue, James Edmonds and the History of the Great War: A Case of "Ritual Murder"?". In Higham (1999), pp. 55–70. (Revised version of "John Fortescue, James Edmonds and the History of the Great War" in the Journal of the Society for Army Historical Research, vol 70 [Summer 1992] pp. 101–113, ISSN 0037-9700)

Websites

- Falls, Cyril; Matthew, H. C. G. (23 September 2004). "Oxford Dictionary of National Biography: Edmonds, Sir James Edward (1861–1956)". Oxford Dictionary of National Biography (online ed.). Oxford: Oxford University Press. doi:10.1093/ref:odnb/32972. ISBN 978-0-19-861412-8. (Subscription, Wikipedia Library access or UK public library membership required.)

Newspapers

- "Birthday Honours". The London Gazette. London: HMSO. 1928. Archived from the original on 11 January 2018."No. 33390". The London Gazette (Supplement). 4 June 1928. p. 3846.
