= Victor Spencer =

New Zealand soldier

Victor Manson Spencer (1 November 1896 – 24 February 1918) was a volunteer from Invercargill, New Zealand who fought in the Otago Infantry Regiment of the New Zealand Division in World War I. Spencer was executed for desertion on 24 February 1918, despite later suggestions that he was severely traumatised by shellshock, having fought and survived several campaigns.

New Zealand soldiers were subject to New Zealand military law which, like all nations involved in the conflict, had the death penalty for a number of crimes, including desertion. Out of the 28 death penalties handed down by the New Zealand military. only four were carried out, the rest being quashed by the British commanders of the armies involved. (In addition, New Zealand Private Jack Braithwaite was executed by the British for mutiny.) By contrast, death penalties imposed on Australian soldiers had to be confirmed by the Governor-General, which the Australian government did not allow, although Australians were hanged at Shepton Mallet Prison for civil crimes.

Spencer was formally pardoned, along with Braithwaite and the three others, under the provisions of the Pardon for Soldiers of the Great War Act 2000, which was passed by the New Zealand Parliament in a departure from custom, since pardons are normally granted by the Crown and are rarely posthumous. The grounds for the pardon was that the execution was not a fate that Spencer deserved, but was one that resulted from (a) the harsh discipline that was believed at the time to be required; and (b) the application of the death penalty for military offences being seen at that time as an essential part of maintaining military discipline.

Section 8 of the Pardon for Soldiers of the Great War Act reads thus:

Pardon of Private Spencer

Private Victor Manson Spencer, regimental number 8/2733, a member of the 1st Battalion, Otago Regiment,—

(a) who was charged with having committed on 13 August 1917 the offence of desertion; and
(b) who was, by a Field General Court Martial held on 17 January 1918, convicted of that offence and sentenced to death; and
(c) who was again sentenced to death on 29 January 1918 after the Field General Court Martial had revised its finding and had convicted him of having committed the offence of desertion not on 13 August 1917 but on 25 August 1917; and
(d) who was, after the sentence of death imposed on him on 29 January 1918 had been confirmed, executed by firing squad in accordance with that sentence on 24 February 1918,—

is, by this Act, granted a pardon for that offence of desertion.

Spencer was included in the mass pardon of 306 British Empire soldiers executed for certain offences during the Great War enacted in section 359 of the UK Parliament's Armed Forces Act 2006, and which came into effect by Royal Assent on 8 November 2006.

He is buried in The Huts Cemetery, Dikkebus, West-Vlaanderen, Belgium.
