= 62nd (2nd West Riding) Division =

Former artillery division of the British Army

2nd West Riding Division 62nd (2nd West Riding) Division
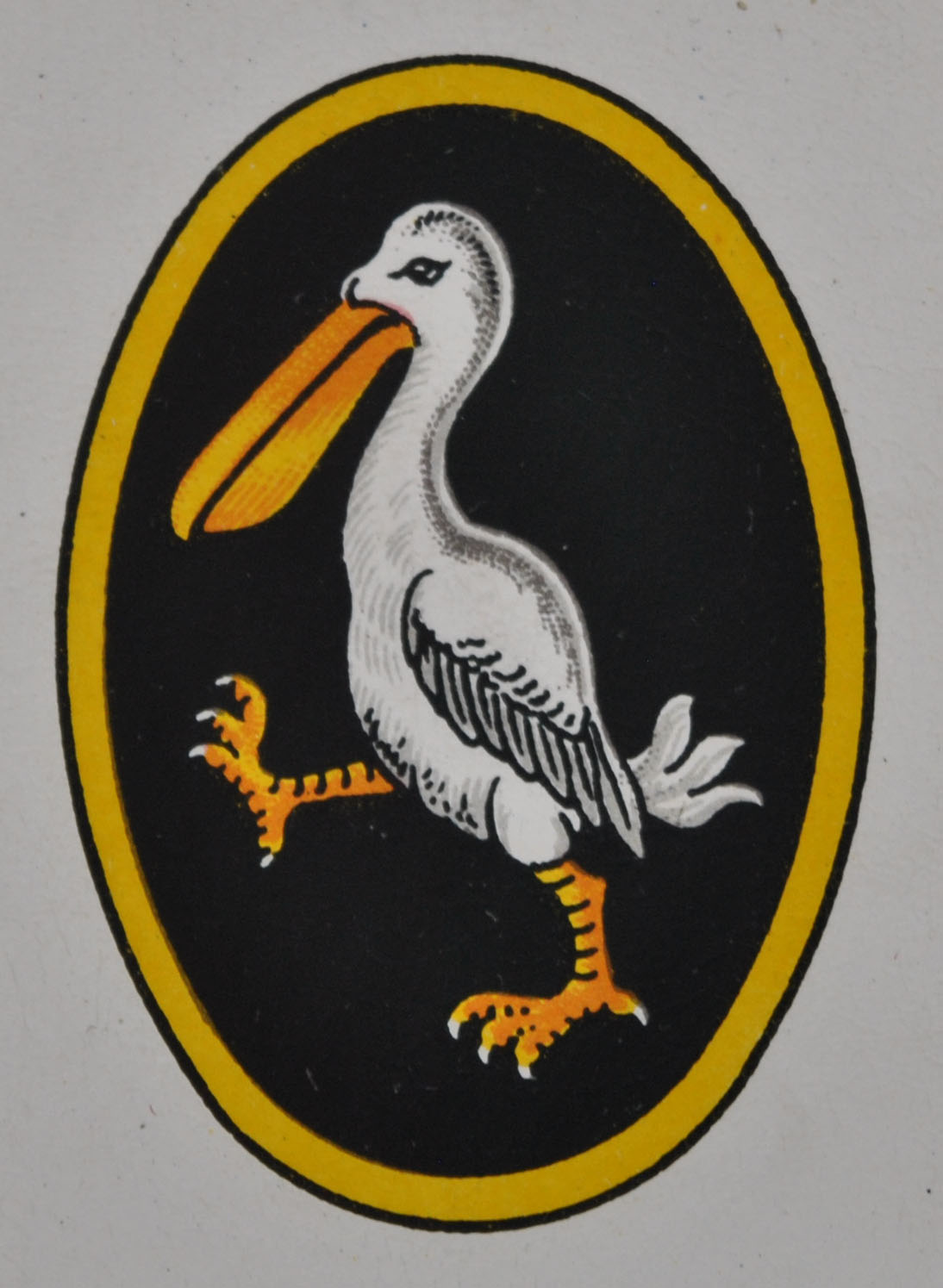
- Division insignia
- Active: 1914–1919
- Country: United Kingdom
- Branch: British Army
- Type: Infantry
- Size: Division
- Engagements: World War I * Battle of Arras (1917) * Battle of Cambrai (1917) * Operation Michael (Somme, 1918) * Second Battle of the Marne * Second Battle of the Somme (1918)

Commanders
- Notable commanders: Walter Braithwaite

The 62nd (2nd West Riding) Division was an infantry division of the British Army that saw active service on the Western Front during the First World War.

== History ==
During the First World War the division fought on the Western Front at Bullecourt in the Battle of Arras and Havrincourt in the Battle of Cambrai. During Operation Michael, in 1918, they were in the line near Arras and in the Ardre Valley during the Second Battle of the Marne. At the opening of the Second Battle of the Somme in 1918, they fought in the Battle of Havrincourt, and continued across the Saint Quentin Canal at Marcoing, before beginning the fighting advance to Maubeuge on the Sambre.

== Order of Battle ==
The order of battle was as follows:

=== 185th (2/1st West Riding) Brigade ===
- 2/5th Battalion, Prince of Wales's Own (West Yorkshire Regiment) (joined March 1915, left August 1918)
- 2/6th Battalion, Prince of Wales's Own (West Yorkshire Regiment) (joined March 1915, left January 1918)
- 2/7th Battalion, Prince of Wales's Own (West Yorkshire Regiment) (joined March 1915, left June 1918)
- 2/8th Battalion, Prince of Wales's Own (West Yorkshire Regiment) (joined March 1915, left February 1918)
- 1/8th Battalion, Prince of Wales's Own (West Yorkshire Regiment) (joined January 1918)
- 1/5th (Prince of Wales's) Battalion, Devonshire Regiment (joined June 1918)
- 2/20th (County of London) Battalion, London Regiment (joined August 1918)

=== 186th (2/2nd West Riding) Brigade ===
- 2/4th Battalion, Duke of Wellington's (West Riding Regiment) (joined March 1915)
- 2/5th Battalion, Duke of Wellington's (West Riding Regiment) (joined March 1915, left January 1918)
- 2/6th Battalion, Duke of Wellington's (West Riding Regiment) (joined March 1915, disbanded January 1918)
- 2/7th Battalion, Duke of Wellington's (West Riding Regiment) (joined March 1915, left as a cadre June 1918)
- 5th Battalion, Duke of Wellington's (West Riding Regiment) (joined January 1918)
- 2/4th Battalion, Hampshire Regiment (joined June 1918)

=== 187th (2/3rd West Riding) Brigade ===
- 2/4th Battalion, King's Own (Yorkshire Light Infantry) (joined March 1915)
- 2/5th Battalion, King's Own (Yorkshire Light Infantry) (joined March 1915, absorbed 1/5th Bn and became simply 5th Bn February 1918)
- 2/4th Hallamshire Battalion, York and Lancaster Regiment (joined March 1915)
- 2/5th Battalion, York and Lancaster Regiment (joined March 1915, disbanded February 1918)

=== 62nd (2nd West Riding) Divisional Artillery ===
- 2/I West Riding Brigade, Royal Field Artillery (RFA) (became CCCX Brigade May 1916)
- 2/II West Riding Brigade, RFA (became CCCXI Brigade May 1916; left as independent Army Field Artillery Brigade January 1917)
- 2/III West Riding Brigade, RFA (became CCCXII Brigade May 1916)
- 2/IV West Riding (Howitzer) Brigade, RFA (broken up May 1916)

== General Officer Commanding ==
- Major General Sir James Trotter February 1915 – December 1915
- Major-General Walter Braithwaite December 1915 – August 1918
- Major-General Robert Whigham August 1918 – 1919

== See also ==
- List of British divisions in World War I

== Bibliography ==
- Anderson, Austin Thomas (1920). War services of the 62nd West Riding Divisional Artillery. Cambridge: Heffer and Sons. OCLC 558510602.
- Becke, Maj A. F. (2007) [1937]. History of the Great War: Order of Battle of Divisions, Part 2b: The 2nd-Line Territorial Force Divisions (57th–69th), with the Home-Service Divisions (71st–73rd) and 74th and 75th Divisions (facs. repr. Naval & Military Press, Uckfield ed.). London: HMSO. ISBN 1-847347-39-8.
- Magnus, Laurie (2004) [1920]. The West Riding Territorials in the Great War (facs. repr. Naval & Military Press, Uckfield ed.). London: Keegan Paul, Trench, Trubner. ISBN 1-845740-77-7.
- Wyrall, E. (1924). The Story of the 62nd (West Riding) Division, 1914–1919. Vol. I. London: The Bodley Head. OCLC 6256569. Archived from the original on 26 June 2019.
