= Walter Braithwaite =

British Army general (1865–1945)

Sir Walter Braithwaite GCB
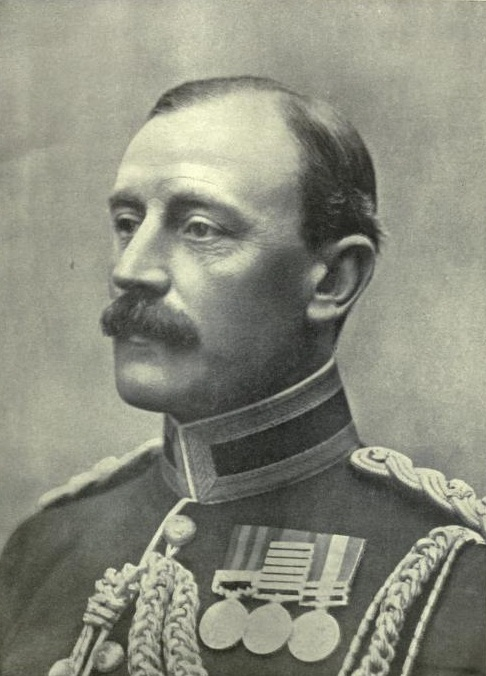
- Braithwaite as a major general in 1915 during the First World War.
- Born: 11 November 1865; Alne, North Yorkshire, England
- Died: 7 September 1945 (aged 79); Rotherwick, Hampshire, England
- Military career
- Allegiance: United Kingdom
- Branch: British Army
- Service years: 1886–1931
- Rank: General
- Nickname: "Braith"
- Units: Somerset Light Infantry; Loyal Regiment (North Lancashire)
- Commands: Eastern Command (1926–1927); Scottish Command (1923–1926); Western Command, India (1920–1923); XII Corps (1919); IX Corps (1918–1919); 62nd (2nd West Riding) Division (1917–1918); Staff College, Quetta (1911−1914)
- Conflicts: Second Boer War; First World War
- Awards: Knight Grand Cross of the Order of the Bath; Mentioned in Despatches

General Sir Walter Pipon Braithwaite, GCB (11 November 1865 – 7 September 1945) was a British Army officer who held senior commands during the First World War. After being dismissed from his position as Chief of Staff for the Mediterranean Expeditionary Force, he received some acclaim as a competent divisional commander on the Western Front. After the war, he was commissioned to produce a report analysing the performance of British staff officers during the conflict.

== Early life ==
Braithwaite was born in Alne, the son of the Reverend William Braithwaite and Laura Elizabeth Pipon. He was the youngest of twelve children. He was educated at Victoria College, Jersey and at Bedford School.

== Early military career ==
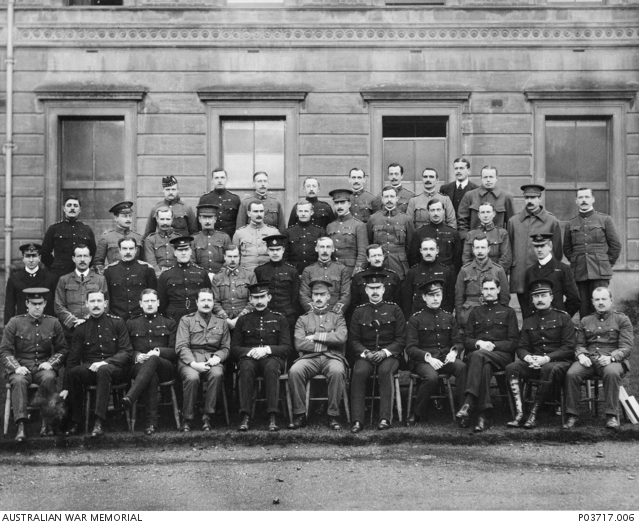
Group portrait of officers at the British Staff College at Camberley, England, 1906. Braithwaite, then a lieutenant colonel, is sat in the front row, second on the right.

Braithwaite studied at the Royal Military College, Sandhurst, and was commissioned as a subaltern, with the rank of lieutenant, into the Somerset Light Infantry on 30 January 1886. He was appointed an adjutant of his regiment in October 1892 and was promoted to captain on 8 November 1894. He attended the Staff College, Camberley, from 1898 to 1899.

He served in the Second Boer War, seeing action at Ladysmith, Spion Kop, Vaal Krantz and Tugela Heights. He was mentioned in despatches three times and in a South Africa honours list received the brevet rank of major on 29 November 1900. Staying in South Africa until the war ended, he only returned to the United Kingdom on the SS Briton three months later in September 1902.

After his return he was in early October posted to Southern Command as a deputy assistant quartermaster general on the staff of Sir Evelyn Wood, General Officer in Command of the 2nd Army Corps. In 1906, Braithwaite was promoted to major, and transferred to The Loyal North Lancashire Regiment. He was later promoted in January 1906 to lieutenant colonel and succeeded Richard Haking as a deputy assistant adjutant general at the Staff College, Camberley. He held this post until May 1908 when he was made a GSO1 there. In March 1909, he was assigned to the staff of Major General Douglas Haig at the War Office in London, and was promoted to brevet colonel. and full colonel in November.

He gave up this appointment in January 1911 and then went on half-pay. He only had to endure this until March, however, when he was subsequently promoted to temporary brigadier general and named commandant of the Staff College, Quetta, a position he still held at the outbreak of the First World War in the summer of 1914. At this point, the college was closed, and he was again transferred to England and the War Office, this time as director of staff duties, taking over from Major General Francis Davies. While serving as commandant, he had been appointed a Companion of the Order of the Bath in the 1911 Coronation Honours in June 1911.

== First World War ==
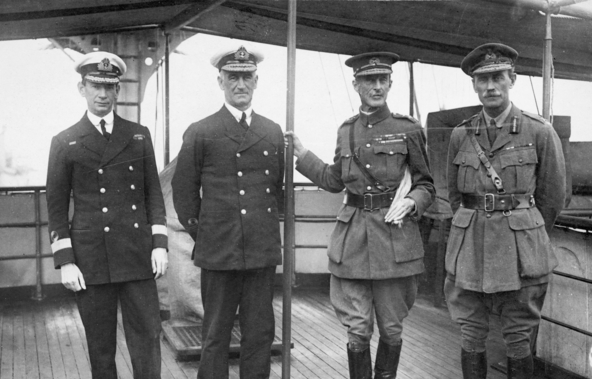
From left to right: Admiral Sir Roger Keyes, Vice-Admiral John de Robeck, General Sir Ian Hamilton, Major General Walter Braithwaite, on board HMS Triad.

In March 1915, seven months into the war, he was promoted to temporary major general and appointed chief of staff to General Sir Ian Hamilton, commander of the Mediterranean Expeditionary Force (MEF), and served in this role throughout the disastrous Gallipoli campaign. He was regarded by many of the Australians involved in that effort as "arrogant and incompetent".

After the failure of the Mediterranean expedition, Braithwaite, whose rank of major general became substantive in June 1915 "for distinguished service in the Field", was recalled to London. He was, in December 1915, assigned to command of the 62nd (2nd West Riding) Division, a Territorial Force (TF) formation, which was posted to the Western Front in January 1917. Here he experienced considerable success. Although the division struggled to make headway during the Battle of Arras in April 1917, it proved a solid and reliable unit during the German spring offensive in March the following year.

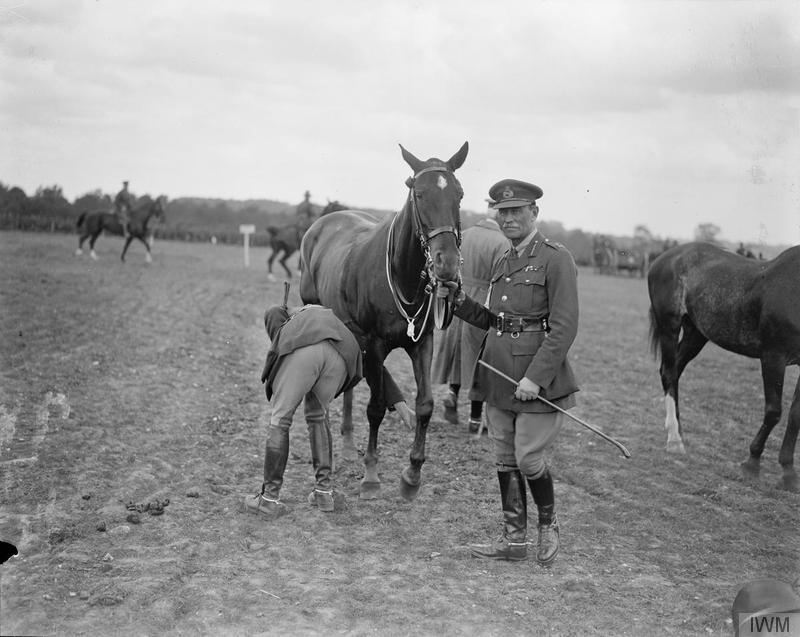
Major-General Walter Braithwaite with his charger which won third prize at the New Zealand Division Horse Show, Pas-en-Artois, France, 16 June 1918.

Following success in repelling German advances at Bullecourt and Cambrai, Braithwaite, made a KCB in June 1918, was promoted to temporary lieutenant general on 27 August 1918 and was later given command of IX Corps on 13 September and, much later still, XII Corps. On 29 September Braithwaite's IX Corps was on the southern front line at the village of Bellenglise facing the canal, when the order came from Haig to attack through the Hindenburg Line. The assault was much more successful than earlier American and Australian efforts, encountering as they did, multiple gas attacks. The spearhead was led by the 46th (North Midland) Division, a TF formation. As Major H. J. C. Marshall, a divisional staff officer, recorded that they were not expected to advance far, leaving that to the Americans and Australians to their left. If they could not get a foothold they were had orders to swim across the canal in ice cold water. But divisional HQ had spared no effort to find all necessary equipment to achieve the objective. They advanced one hour later than the Americans under a hail of machine gun bullets and "cyclone of shells". A thick fog came down helping to mask them from German sight. Pushing on through the dawn's early light, a battalion of the North Staffordshire Regiment overran the German machine gun positions; the bridge's defenders were shot and killed, as the infantry fixed bayonets and charged. 5,000 German prisoners of war (POWs) were taken. For almost the first time in the war the attack had been an outstanding success. Brathwaite received plaudits from Monash and Rawlinson. The 46th Division recovered over 1,000 machine guns. Weeks later King George V visited Bellenglise, the site where the Hindenburg Line was breached by a Territorial unit.

Braithwaite was devastated by his son's death on 1 July 1916, the first day of the Battle of the Somme. Having no heir, he burnt all his family papers. As successes emerged on the battlefields in late 1918, Field Marshal Sir Douglas Haig, commander-in-chief (C-in-C) of the British Expeditionary Force (BEF) on the Western Front, was effusive in praise of his officers' and men's achievement, showing the friendship and esteem for which he was held by Braithwaite all his life.

== Post war ==
After the war, Braithwaite was commissioned by Haig to produce a report evaluating the performance of British staff officers in all theatres of the conflict. Although the decision-making abilities of many staff officers (including Braithwaite) had been seriously questioned during the war, Braithwaite's report was generally favourable.

He became general officer commanding-in-chief Western Command, India in December 1920, which he relinquished command of in June 1923. He was then GOC-in-C at Scottish Command in 1923, in succession to General Sir Francis Davies, and then GOC-in-C at Eastern Command in February 1926 during which time he was promoted to general in April. In March 1927 he was appointed Adjutant-General to the Forces. Later that month, following the death of General Sir Walter Congreve, he became an aide-de-camp general to King George V. In early 1928 he was in charge of arranging Field Marshal Haig's funeral. In July 1929 he became colonel of the Somerset Light Infantry, taking over from Lieutenant General Sir Thomas Snow.

He relinquished his appointment of adjutant general and retired from the army in March 1931.

He served as a commissioner of the Commonwealth War Graves Commission from 1927 to 1931, as governor of the Royal Hospital Chelsea from October 1931 to 1938, and as King of Arms of the Order of the Bath from 1933 until his death.

He died at his home in Rotherwick, Hampshire on 7 September 1945, at the age of 79.

== Family ==
Braithwaite married in 1895 Jessie Ashworth, with whom he had a son, Valentine. Captain Valentine Braithwaite MC was killed in action at Serre while serving with his father's former regiment, the Somerset Light Infantry, on 1 July 1916 aged 20.

== Bibliography ==
- Edmonds, Brigadier General Sir John (1939). Military Operations: France and Belgium 1914–1918. Vol. I, II, III, IV. London: Macmillan.
- Edmonds, Sir John, ed. (1947). Military Operations: France and Belgium 1918, volume IV. London: HMSO.
- Sir John Edmonds and R Maxwell-Hyslop (eds.) Military Operations France and Belgium 1918, volume V, London, HMSO, 1947
- Walker, Jonathan (1998). "The Blood Tub. General Gough and the Battle of Bullecourt, 1917". E and J Gellibrand Diary, 10 March 1906. Staplehurst: Spellmount.
- Harris, J.P. (2008). Douglas Haig and the First World War. Cambridge: CUP.
- Paschall, R. (1989). The Defeat of Imperial Germany 1917–1918. Chapel Hill, NC: Algonquin Books.
- Peaple, Simon (2015). "Mud, Blood and Determination. The History of the 46th (North Midland) Division in the Great War". Wolverhampton Military Studies 14. Helion & Company (15 April 2015. ISBN 978-1910294666.
- Priestley, R.E. (1919). Breaking the Hindenburg Line: The Story of the 46th (North Midland) Division. London: T Fisher Unwin.

Military offices
Preceded by Thompson Capper	Commandant of the Staff College, Quetta; 1911−1914	Succeeded by College closed
Preceded by Sir James Trotter	GOC 62nd (2nd West Riding) Division; 1915−1918	Succeeded by Robert Whigham
Preceded by Alexander Hamilton-Gordon	GOC IX Corps; 1918–1919	Succeeded by Post disbanded
Preceded by New post	GOC-in-C, Western Command, India; 1920–1923	Succeeded by Sir George Kirkpatrick
Preceded by Sir Francis Davies	GOC-in-C Scottish Command; 1923–1926	Succeeded by Sir William Peyton
Preceded by Sir George Milne	GOC-in-C Eastern Command; 1926–1927	Succeeded by Sir Robert Whigham
Preceded by Sir Robert Whigham	Adjutant General; 1927–1931	Succeeded by Sir Archibald Montgomery-Massingberd
Honorary titles
Preceded by Sir Thomas Snow	Colonel of the Somerset Light Infantry; 1929–1938	Succeeded by Vivian Majendie
Preceded by Sir Neville Lyttelton	Governor, Royal Hospital Chelsea; 1931–1938	Succeeded by Sir Harry Knox
Heraldic offices
Preceded by Sir William Pakenham	King of Arms of the Order of the Bath; 1933–1946	Succeeded by Sir Max Horton
