= James Trotter (British Army officer) =

British Army officer

Major-General Sir James Trotter KCB CMG
- Born: 24 July 1849
- Died: 30 September 1940 (aged 91)
- Military career
- Allegiance: United Kingdom
- Branch: British Army
- Rank: Major-General
- Unit: Royal Artillery
- Commands: 62nd (2nd West Riding) Division
- Conflicts: South Coast Defences; First World War
- Awards: Knight Commander of the Order of the Bath; Companion of the Order of St Michael and St George

Major-General Sir James Keith Trotter, KCB, CMG (24 July 1849 – 30 September 1940) was a senior British Army officer.

== Military career ==
Educated at Rossall School, Durham School and the Royal Military Academy, Woolwich, Trotter was commissioned into the Royal Artillery on 7 January 1870.

By now a lieutenant colonel, he was promoted to colonel and made an assistant adjutant general in July 1899.

He became deputy director of mobilisation and military intelligence at the War Office in 1903, brigadier general in charge of administration at Western Command in 1905 and, after being promoted to major general on 24 July, commander of the troops in Sierra Leone in September 1906. He went on to be general officer commanding (GOC) the South Coast Defences in April 1908 and retired from the army in July 1911 before taking up a civilian role in the Secret Intelligence Service where he set up G (German) Branch to expose subversion among trade unionists and pacifists. He was appointed a Knight Commander of the Order of the Bath in June 1912.

He was recalled to become General Officer Commanding 62nd (2nd West Riding) Division in February 1915 during the First World War. He handed over his command and returned to retirement in December 1915.

== Family ==
In 1878 he married Alice Crow; they had one son, James Keith.

James served as a Lieutenant in the Gordon Highlanders during the Great War. He was killed in action on 26 August 1914 and is buried in Caudry British Cemetery in France.

Military offices
New title	GOC 62nd (2nd West Riding) Division; February 1915 − December 1915	Succeeded by Walter Braithwaite
