= John Braithwaite (writer) =

John Braithwaite (fl. 1660) was an English Quaker.

== Early life ==
Braithwaite was probably born in 1633, as there is an entry in the Cartmel registers of the baptism on 24 March 1633 of John, son of James Braithwaite of Newton.

== Career ==
George Fox records in his 'Journal' that, being at Newton-in-Cartmel in 1652, where he attempted to preach to the people after service, he spoke to a youth whom he noticed in the chapel taking notes. The young man was John Braithwaite, who afterwards became his earnest follower. He published three tracts in support of Fox's doctrines:

- A serious Meditation upon the dealings of God with England and the State thereof in General (not dated)
- The Ministers of England which are called the Ministers of the Gospel weighed in the Balance of Equity, &c., (1660)
- To all those that observe Days, Months, Times, and Years, &c., (1660)

In 1658 he, or one of his name, travelled many miles to visit a friend confined in Ilchester gaol, but was "unmercifully beaten by the wicked gaoler and not suffered to come in;" and at another time he was sent to prison, along with Thomas Briggs, a Cheshire man, for preaching at Salisbury.

A John Braithwaite, who may be the same man, was resident in the island of Barbados between 1669 and 1693, where he suffered frequent fines in default of not appearing in arms, and for refusing to pay church dues. Braithwaite is stated by Smith in his Catalogue of Friends' Books to have died at Chippenham, Wiltshire.
