= Jill Braithwaite =

British archaeologist

Gillian Mary, Lady Braithwaite (née Robinson; 15 September 1937 – 10 November 2008), known as Jill Braithwaite, was a British diplomat and archaeologist.

== Early life ==
Lady Braithwaite was born in London to Ida and Patrick Robinson. She studied at Roedean School, and went on to graduate in French, Italian and Spanish, at Westfield College. She later learned Russian and Polish.

She married Rodric Braithwaite in April 1961. They had five children: four boys and a girl. In 1971, one of her twin sons, Mark, died.

== Career ==
=== Diplomacy ===
In November 1959, Braithwaite joined the British Foreign Office. Her first posting was to Warsaw as a Political Secretary. Following her marriage, she was forced to resign from the diplomatic service. However, she continued her public service in an unofficial capacity.

During the 1991 Soviet coup d'état attempt, her husband was the British ambassador in Moscow. She supported Boris Yeltsin and other demonstrators against the KGB-led plotters. She thereafter was instrumental in the establishment of several organisations aiming at social reform in the former Soviet Union. She supported a children's home at Dmitrov, and helped restore the ruined Tolga monastery as a nunnery in Yaroslavl. She was involved in the improvement of care for disabled children in the Volga region, and elderly care in Siberia.

The BEARR Trust was set up in 1991 under her aegis. In 1993, she co-founded the Russian European Trust for Welfare Reform.

=== Archaeology ===
In 1979, Braithwaite began working towards a second undergraduate degree – in archaeology – at the Institute of Archaeology in London. Her thesis on face pots in Roman Britain was published in the journal Britannia, and she received a first class degree.

She then began a PhD as an external candidate of London University, which she obtained in 1993. Her expanded doctoral thesis was published in 2007 as Faces of the Past. She won the John Gillam prize posthumously in 2009 for this work.

Braithwaite's main contribution to the field was the establishment of a typology and a chronology for Roman face pots. As part of her research, she catalogued sherds and pots obtained from across Europe – from the Black Sea to Iberia, and southern Italy to Scotland. She was able to demonstrate that they were used as burial urns.

She showed that the faces were not mass-produced from moulds, but rather the potters added them after the pots were made, and shaped them according to their personal whim or local fashion. She was also able to demonstrate that the propagation of the fashion mirrored that of the Roman army, with linked face pots appearing in various locations as known Roman legions moved from region to region.

== Later life ==
Braithwaite became a director of the National Institute for Social Work in 1995.

Braithwaite died in London on 10 November 2008, following a long battle with cancer. She was buried in Levington, Suffolk.

== Publications ==
- West Roman Face Pots, Face Beakers, and Head Pots (Thesis). London: Institute of Archaeology. 1982.
- "Romano-British Face Pots and Head Pots". Britannia. 15. November 1984.
- Ellis, Peter (ed.). "The Roman Pottery" (PDF). The Roman Baths and Macellum at Wroxeter: Excavations by Graham Webster 1955–85. English Heritage. p. 212.
- Tuffreau-Libre, M; Jacques, A, eds. (2001). "The face pots of Gallia Belgica seen in the light of the early development of Roman face pots and face beakers and their connection with the Roman army". La céramique en Gaule et en Bretagne romaines: Commerce, contacts et romanisation (12). Nord-Ouest Archéologie.
- Faces from the past: a study of Roman face pots from Italy and the Western Provinces of the Roman Empire. British Archaeological Reports. Vol. 1651. 2007.
