= Braithwaite baronets =

Set index for Braithwaite baronets

There have been two baronetcies created for persons with the surname Braithwaite, both in the Baronetage of the United Kingdom. Both creations are extinct.

- Braithwaite baronets of Poston (1802)
- Braithwaite baronets, of Burnham (1954): see Sir Gurney Braithwaite, 1st Baronet (1895–1958)
