= John Braithwaite (soldier) =

New Zealand journalist

- Born: 3 January 1885; Dunedin, New Zealand
- Died: 29 October 1916 (aged 31); Rouen, France
- Relatives: Joseph Braithwaite (father); Warwick Braithwaite (brother); Rewi Braithwaite (brother); Roderick Braithwaite (brother); Rodric Braithwaite (nephew); Nicholas Braithwaite (nephew); David Braithwaite (nephew)
- Military career
- Allegiance: New Zealand
- Branch: New Zealand Military Forces
- Service years: 1915–1916
- Rank: Private
- Conflicts: First World War; Western Front

John Braithwaite (3 January 1885 – 29 October 1916) was a New Zealander who served in the First World War with the New Zealand Expeditionary Force. Supposedly a journalist before the war, in 1916 he was convicted of mutiny and executed by firing squad. He was posthumously pardoned in September 2000 through the passage of the Pardon for Soldiers of the Great War Act 2000.

== Early life ==
John Braithwaite was born in Dunedin, New Zealand, on 3 January 1885, as Cecil James Braithwaite, one of 16 children to Mary Ann Braithwaite and bookseller Joseph Braithwaite. After completing his schooling, he worked alongside his father, who would rise to become the mayor of Dunedin in 1905/06.

Braithwaite later claimed to have become a journalist who lived in Sydney, Australia, for a time from 1911. However, over the period from 1911 to 1915 he appeared in court in New Zealand for a number of criminal offences, including theft of jewellery and a bicycle. He also appears to have spent time on Rotoroa Island, an alcohol rehabilitation facility run by the Salvation Army, for at least a part of 1912. He was acquitted of one offence, in February 1915.

== First World War ==
Braithwaite enlisted in the New Zealand Expeditionary Force (NZEF) in May 1915. Some of his brothers were already serving abroad with the NZEF, one being wounded at Gallipoli. He was posted to the 2nd Battalion of the New Zealand Rifle Brigade and embarked for the Middle East in January 1916. Within a matter of weeks of arriving in Egypt, he was transferred to 2nd Battalion, Otago Infantry Regiment. Promoted to lance corporal in April, his unit was shipped to France for service on the Western Front. His performance as a soldier soon deteriorated.

In May 1916, shortly after his arrival in France, Braithwaite was demoted for being absent without leave. The following month, he was courtmartialed for three offences; a second period of absence without leave; lying to an officer; and falsifying a leave pass. He was sentenced to 60-days Field Punishment No. 2 but continued to disregard military discipline. The following month he escaped confinement and on recapture, a senior NZEF officer recommended that he be returned to New Zealand to serve out his punishment. Sentenced to two years imprisonment for his escape, he was being transferred to a prison facility at Blargies when he evaded his guards and went on the run for two days before being caught. He received a further two-year term of imprisonment.

=== Mutiny at Blargies ===
Sent to Blargies prison camp, Braithwaite appeared to settle down and accept prison life. He applied to the commandant of the prison for a suspension of his sentence so that he, and other soldiers of New Zealand and Australia, could return to the front lines. His request was passed to Lieutenant General William Birdwood, commanding officer of I ANZAC Corps. In late August 1916, Braithwaite became involved in a mutiny. Blargies had already been the scene of an earlier mutiny by British soldiers protesting at their treatment. This time, an Australian prisoner had become unruly and began resisting attempts by guards to confine him. Braithwaite intervened and dragged the Australian away from the guards and a gathering crowd of Australian prisoners, already disgruntled at their harsh treatment. He later claimed that he reminded the struggling Australian of the petition to Birdwood and not to jeopardise this and that his (Braithwaite's) actions were aimed at calming the situation. However, he, along with three others, were charged with mutiny.

Braithwaite pleaded not guilty, but despite evidence from other prisoners that confirmed his side of the story, a general court martial of five British Army officers, convicted him of mutiny and conferred a sentence of death by firing squad. The three other soldiers on trial, all Australians, received the same sentence. The decision of the court martial was sent to the commander of the British Expeditionary Force, General Douglas Haig, for approval but was accompanied by a recommendation from the convening officer that the sentences be reduced to a 10-year term of imprisonment.

However, Haig, who in dealing with these matters favoured confirming the death sentence for the perceived ringleader while commuting similar sentences for other soldiers involved in the same incident, deemed Braithwaite the responsible party for the mutiny and as was his habit, confirmed the sentence of death. The sentences passed onto the Australians were commuted to two-years punishment with hard labour. Braithwaite was shot by a firing squad early in the morning of 29 October 1916. The only New Zealand soldier executed for mutiny during the war, he is buried in the St Sever Cemetery Extension in the city of Rouen.

== Legacy ==
The execution of Braithwaite received little publicity at the time. Even immediately after the war, when the New Zealand government became aware of the severity of his treatment compared to the Australian mutineers, it decided to keep the release of information of the circumstances of his fate to a minimum. However, by the 1980s the injustice of Braithwaite's treatment was widely known and in September 2000, the New Zealand Parliament passed a bill, the Pardon for Soldiers of the Great War Act 2000, that pardoned Braithwaite and four other New Zealand soldiers that were executed during the war.
