= Rewi Braithwaite =

New Zealand footballer

Personal information
- Full name: John Rewi Fergusson Braithwaite
- Date of birth: 25 September 1897
- Place of birth: Dunedin, New Zealand
- Date of death: 15 January 1987 (aged 89)
- Place of death: Hastings, New Zealand
- Position: Defender

Senior career*
Years	Team	Apps	(Gls)
?–1922	Huntly		
1923–?	Ponsonby		

International career
1922–23	New Zealand	6	(0)
- * Club domestic league appearances and goals

John Rewi Fergusson Braithwaite (25 September 1897 – 15 January 1987) was an association football player who represented New Zealand, playing in New Zealand's first ever official international.

Braithwaite made his full New Zealand debut in that country's inaugural A-international fixture, beating Australia 3–1 on 17 June 1922 and ended his international playing career with six A-international caps to his credit, his final cap an appearance in a 4–1 win over Australia on 30 June 1923.

Braithwaite later served as a St Kilda borough councillor, representing the Labour Party.
