= Deanwell =

Suburb of Hamilton, New Zealand

- Suburb
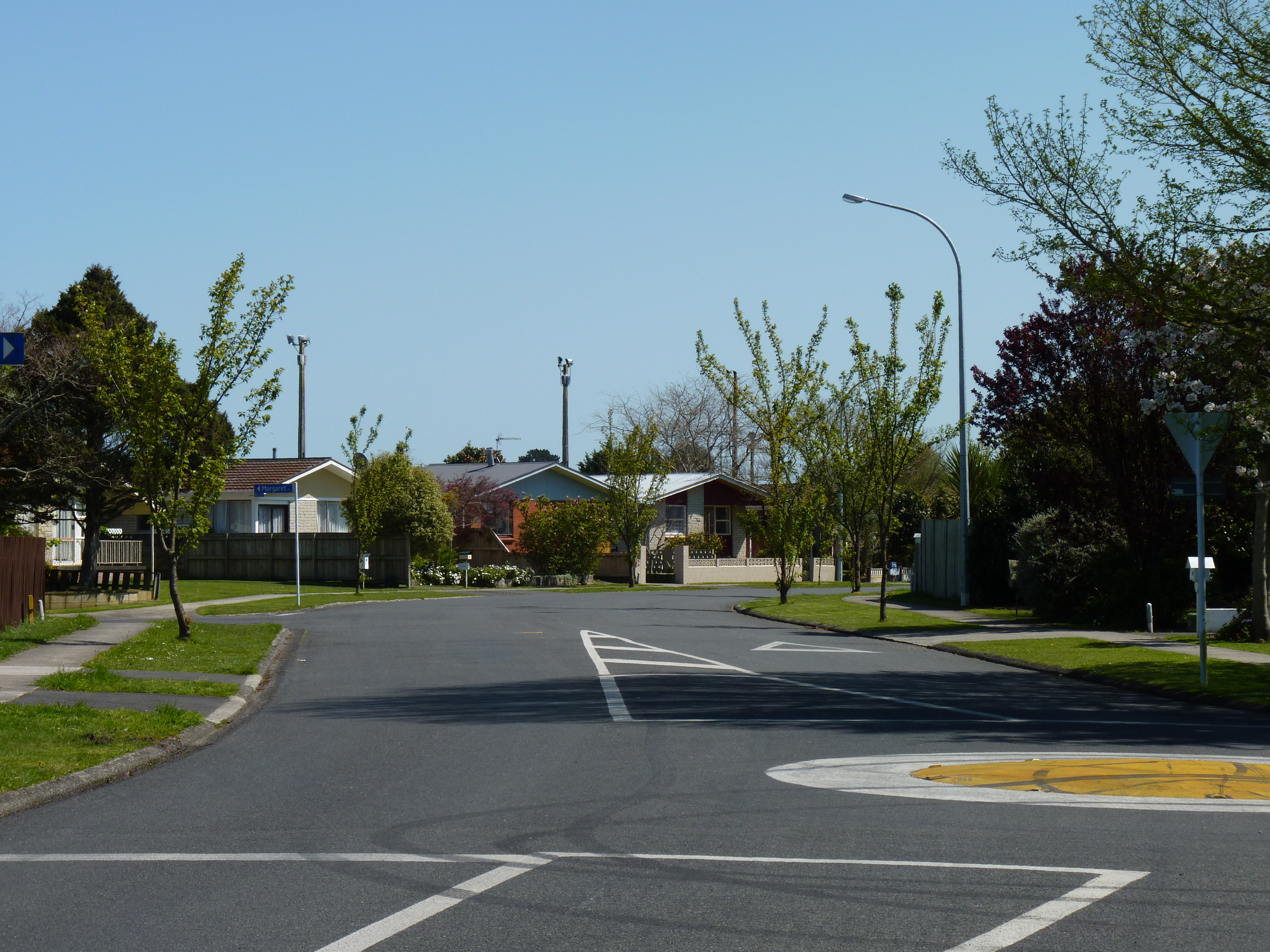
- A neighbourhood in Deanwell, Hamilton.
- Interactive map of Deanwell
- Coordinates: 37°49′13.3″S 175°16′35.02″E
- Country: New Zealand
- City: Hamilton, New Zealand
- Local authority: Hamilton City Council
- Electoral ward: West Ward
- Established: 1974

Area
  - Land: 67 ha (170 acres)

Population (June 2025)
  - Total: 2,270
  - Density: 3,400/km^{2} (8,800/sq mi)

Dinsdale	Melville	Bader
Temple View	Deanwell	Glenview
Ngāhinapōuri	Rukuhia railway station	Rukuhia

Deanwell is a suburb in south-western Hamilton in New Zealand. It is named after Deanwell Properties, the developers who subdivided the area. It was defined as a suburb of Hamilton in 1974.

== Demographics ==
Deanwell covers 0.67 km^{2} (0.26 sq mi) and had an estimated population of 2,270 as of June 2025, with a population density of 3,388 people per km^{2}.

Historical population
Year	Pop.	±% p.a.
2006	2,004	—
2013	1,998	−0.04%
2018	2,139	+1.37%
2023	2,076	−0.60%

Deanwell had a population of 2,076 in the 2023 New Zealand census, a decrease of 63 people (−2.9%) since the 2018 census, and an increase of 78 people (3.9%) since the 2013 census. There were 984 males, 1,089 females and 3 people of other genders in 669 dwellings. 3.0% of people identified as LGBTIQ+. The median age was 32.0 years (compared with 38.1 years nationally). There were 513 people (24.7%) aged under 15 years, 441 (21.2%) aged 15 to 29, 918 (44.2%) aged 30 to 64, and 207 (10.0%) aged 65 or older.

People could identify as more than one ethnicity. The results were 50.3% European (Pākehā); 29.8% Māori; 6.5% Pasifika; 27.6% Asian; 2.2% Middle Eastern, Latin American and African New Zealanders (MELAA); and 1.0% other, which includes people giving their ethnicity as "New Zealander". English was spoken by 94.1%, Māori language by 7.8%, Samoan by 0.6%, and other languages by 21.1%. No language could be spoken by 2.7% (e.g. too young to talk). New Zealand Sign Language was known by 0.4%. The percentage of people born overseas was 29.0, compared with 28.8% nationally.

Religious affiliations were 32.1% Christian, 6.4% Hindu, 3.6% Islam, 1.3% Māori religious beliefs, 2.0% Buddhist, 0.1% New Age, 0.1% Jewish, and 2.2% other religions. People who answered that they had no religion were 45.8%, and 6.8% of people did not answer the census question.

Of those at least 15 years old, 360 (23.0%) people had a bachelor's or higher degree, 771 (49.3%) had a post-high school certificate or diploma, and 432 (27.6%) people exclusively held high school qualifications. The median income was $41,700, compared with $41,500 nationally. 78 people (5.0%) earned over $100,000 compared to 12.1% nationally. The employment status of those at least 15 was that 819 (52.4%) people were employed full-time, 159 (10.2%) were part-time, and 66 (4.2%) were unemployed.

== Education ==
Deanwell School is a contributing primary school for years 1 to 6 with a roll of 336. The school opened in 1973.

Te Kura Kaupapa Māori o Whakawatea is a co-educational state Māori immersion primary school, with a roll of 133.

South City Christian School is a co-educational state-integrated Christian primary school, with a roll of 212.

All these schools are co-educational. Rolls are as of July 2025.

== See also ==
- List of streets in Hamilton
- Suburbs of Hamilton, New Zealand
