= Bader, New Zealand =

Suburb of Hamilton, New Zealand

Bader
- Suburb
- Interactive map of Bader
- Coordinates: 37.809°S 175.293°E
- Country: New Zealand
- City: Hamilton, New Zealand
- Local authority: Hamilton City Council
- Electoral ward: West Ward

Area
  - Land: 110 ha (270 acres)

Population (June 2025)
  - Total: 3,030
  - Density: 2,800/km^{2} (7,100/sq mi)

Hamilton East; Waikato Hospital		Hamilton East
Melville	Bader
	Glenview	Fitzroy

Bader is a suburb in southern Hamilton in New Zealand. The main street is named after WW II flying ace Douglas Bader.

In 2022, Kāinga Ora announced it was building an extra 75 state houses in Bader. There were already older state houses in the area.

== Demographics ==
Bader covers 1.10 km^{2} (0.42 sq mi) and had an estimated population of 3,030 as of June 2025, with a population density of 2,755 people per km^{2}.

Historical population
Year	Pop.	±% p.a.
2006	2,235	—
2013	2,208	−0.17%
2018	2,556	+2.97%
2023	2,718	+1.24%

Bader had a population of 2,718 in the 2023 New Zealand census, an increase of 162 people (6.3%) since the 2018 census, and an increase of 510 people (23.1%) since the 2013 census. There were 1,362 males, 1,347 females and 12 people of other genders in 801 dwellings. 3.8% of people identified as LGBTIQ+. The median age was 28.5 years (compared with 38.1 years nationally). There were 756 people (27.8%) aged under 15 years, 696 (25.6%) aged 15 to 29, 1,053 (38.7%) aged 30 to 64, and 210 (7.7%) aged 65 or older.

People could identify as more than one ethnicity. The results were 41.9% European (Pākehā); 48.7% Māori; 14.3% Pasifika; 15.6% Asian; 2.2% Middle Eastern, Latin American and African New Zealanders (MELAA); and 1.0% other, which includes people giving their ethnicity as "New Zealander". English was spoken by 92.8%, Māori language by 11.9%, Samoan by 1.8%, and other languages by 14.7%. No language could be spoken by 3.6% (e.g. too young to talk). New Zealand Sign Language was known by 0.7%. The percentage of people born overseas was 21.6, compared with 28.8% nationally.

Religious affiliations were 33.6% Christian, 1.9% Hindu, 2.4% Islam, 3.8% Māori religious beliefs, 0.3% Buddhist, 0.6% New Age, 0.1% Jewish, and 2.2% other religions. People who answered that they had no religion were 48.7%, and 6.6% of people did not answer the census question.

Of those at least 15 years old, 339 (17.3%) people had a bachelor's or higher degree, 972 (49.5%) had a post-high school certificate or diploma, and 648 (33.0%) people exclusively held high school qualifications. The median income was $34,400, compared with $41,500 nationally. 63 people (3.2%) earned over $100,000 compared to 12.1% nationally. The employment status of those at least 15 was that 912 (46.5%) people were employed full-time, 189 (9.6%) were part-time, and 132 (6.7%) were unemployed.

== Education ==
Richmond Park School was a primary school at the corner of Bader and Pine streets. It closed in January 2005 when the school roll dropped from 200 to 80. Te Kōhanga Reo o Te Rapa used the site until the end of 2020, and Te Kōhanga Reo o Whanaungatanga used it until early 2022. The land was then declared to be surplus and was to be offered back to Waikato Tainui. In September 2024, the offer to Tainui was still pending.

== See also ==
- List of streets in Hamilton - Bader
- Suburbs of Hamilton, New Zealand
