= Melville, New Zealand =

Suburb of Hamilton, New Zealand

Melville
- Suburb
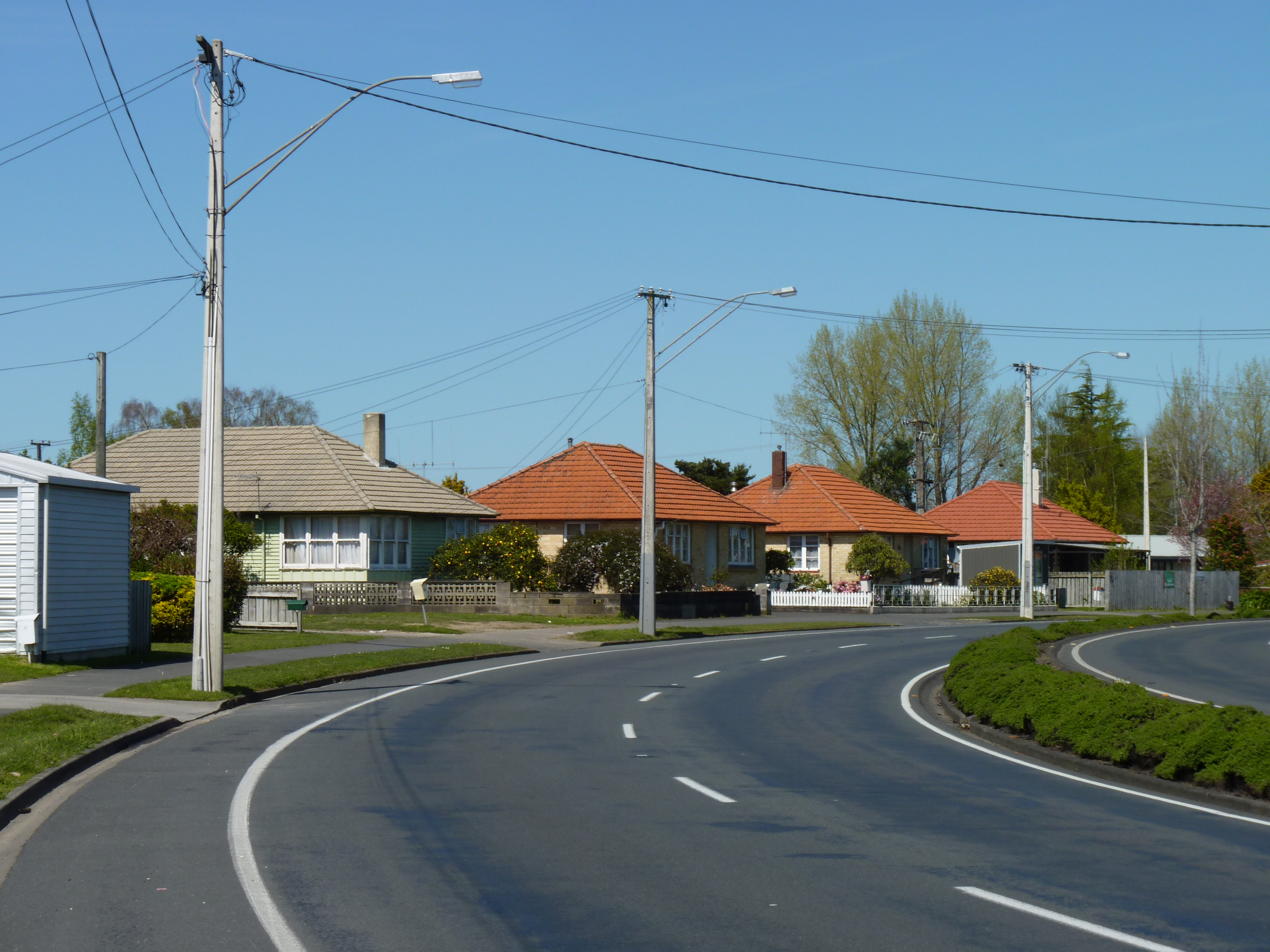
- Melville, Hamilton
- Interactive map of Melville
- Coordinates: 37°48′41.57″S 175°16′55.87″E
- Country: New Zealand
- City: Hamilton, New Zealand
- Local authority: Hamilton City Council
- Electoral ward: West Ward

Area
  - Land: 168 ha (420 acres)

Population (June 2025)
  - Total: 6,360
  - Density: 3,790/km^{2} (9,800/sq mi)

Frankton	Hamilton Lake	Hamilton West; Waikato Hospital
	Melville	Bader
Temple View	Deanwell	Glenview

Melville is a suburb in southern Hamilton in New Zealand. It is named after James Dougal Melville. Many of the streets in Melville are named after war heroes, including Bernard Montgomery, Odette Hallowes, David Beatty and William Slim.

Melville lends its name to one of Hamilton's top association football teams, Melville United who compete in the Lotto Sport Italia NRFL Premier.

It borders the suburbs of Glenview and Fitzroy.

== History ==
Melville was named after the districts pioneer J Melville who lived in 1904 opposite the site of Melville Primary School. The Hospital paved the way for a great deal of development throughout the Melville area. Opened in 1887 the area quickly became known as Hospital Hill although it was not added to the Hamilton Borough until 1936. Hamilton city extended its boundaries to Collins Road, Melville in 1954 and again in 1962 to Houchens Road, Glenview and Dixon Road, Glenview. In 1960 Melville gained Hamiltons 4th suburban post office which was followed in 1964 with the opening of Melville High School. The facilities in Melville reflected the significant growth of Melville / Glenview throughout the 1950s.

Melville was transferred from Waipa County to Hamilton City in 1949.

== Pool ==
The Gallagher Aquatic Centre is located in Melville.

== Demographics ==
Melville covers 1.68 km^{2} (0.65 sq mi) and had an estimated population of 6,360 as of June 2025, with a population density of 3,786 people per km^{2}.

Historical population
Year	Pop.	±% p.a.
2006	4,311	—
2013	4,587	+0.89%
2018	5,223	+2.63%
2023	5,652	+1.59%

Melville had a population of 5,652 in the 2023 New Zealand census, an increase of 429 people (8.2%) since the 2018 census, and an increase of 1,065 people (23.2%) since the 2013 census. There were 2,751 males, 2,865 females and 36 people of other genders in 1,941 dwellings. 4.2% of people identified as LGBTIQ+. The median age was 31.8 years (compared with 38.1 years nationally). There were 1,227 people (21.7%) aged under 15 years, 1,323 (23.4%) aged 15 to 29, 2,622 (46.4%) aged 30 to 64, and 477 (8.4%) aged 65 or older.

People could identify as more than one ethnicity. The results were 43.1% European (Pākehā); 31.1% Māori; 8.5% Pasifika; 33.1% Asian; 2.5% Middle Eastern, Latin American and African New Zealanders (MELAA); and 1.4% other, which includes people giving their ethnicity as "New Zealander". English was spoken by 93.7%, Māori language by 8.5%, Samoan by 1.2%, and other languages by 24.0%. No language could be spoken by 2.9% (e.g. too young to talk). New Zealand Sign Language was known by 0.7%. The percentage of people born overseas was 36.1, compared with 28.8% nationally.

Religious affiliations were 38.7% Christian, 5.8% Hindu, 2.3% Islam, 1.8% Māori religious beliefs, 1.4% Buddhist, 0.6% New Age, 0.1% Jewish, and 2.2% other religions. People who answered that they had no religion were 41.1%, and 6.1% of people did not answer the census question.

Of those at least 15 years old, 1,323 (29.9%) people had a bachelor's or higher degree, 1,956 (44.2%) had a post-high school certificate or diploma, and 1,143 (25.8%) people exclusively held high school qualifications. The median income was $44,500, compared with $41,500 nationally. 234 people (5.3%) earned over $100,000 compared to 12.1% nationally. The employment status of those at least 15 was that 2,568 (58.0%) people were employed full-time, 441 (10.0%) were part-time, and 207 (4.7%) were unemployed.

Individual statistical areas
Name	Area (km^{2})	Population	Density (per km^{2})	Dwellings	Median age	Median income
Melville North	0.69	3,147	4,581	1,131	32.4 years	$48,700
Melville South	0.99	2,505	2,530	813	30.6 years	$39,100
New Zealand					38.1 years	$41,500

== Education ==
Mangakotukutuku College is a composite school for years 7 to 13. It was founded in 2024. The school was formerly Melville Intermediate School and Melville High School.

Melville Primary School is a contributing primary school for years 1 to 6 with a roll of 251 students. The school is separated from Melville Intermediate by State Highway 3. It opened in 1924.

St Pius X School is a state-integrated Catholic full primary school for years 1 to 8 with a roll of 274 students. It was founded in 1958.

All these schools are coeducational. Rolls are as of July 2026.

== See also ==
- List of streets in Hamilton - Bader, Melville
- Suburbs of Hamilton, New Zealand
