= List of streets in Hamilton, Waikato =

Roads in district of New Zealand

Hamilton streets have been formed since the 1864 Invasion of the Waikato, after which the first crown grants were given to members of the occupying force, the 4th Waikato Militia, and plans made of the initial street layout. The tables below show the 1,782 streets listed by Hamilton City Council as at 3 August 2020. They also include information from Hamilton City Libraries Heritage street name index cards. As the dates of naming and the old maps (see External links below) show, the city has grown a lot since it was village in 1864. The shortest roads are small cul-de-sacs, the longest road reaching the centre of the city is River Road, which stretches 20 km (12 mi) to Ngāruawāhia. The list is not comprehensive, omitting streets such as Percival Road. The suburbs are as shown on the 2020 list, though there is some inconsistency, such as May and the adjoining June streets being shown in different suburbs.

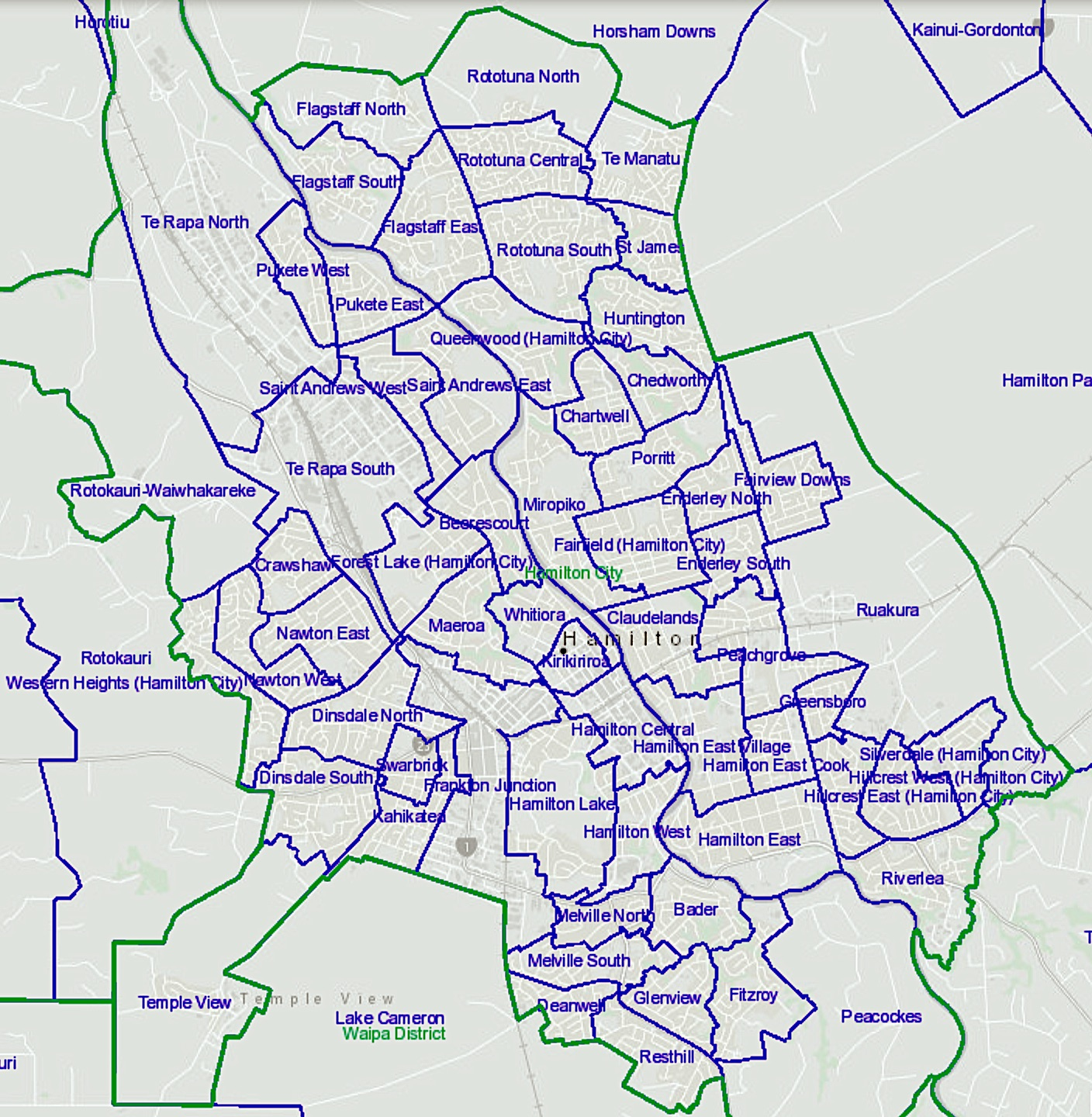
There were 60 Hamilton census areas in 2018, as shown on this map. This list of streets is divided into 37 suburbs.

== Bader ==
Street name	Year street was named/ HCC minutes	Named by owner (HCC = Hamilton City Council, HBC = Hamilton Borough Council)	Named after (? = no documentary evidence, Cr = councillor)	Other notes
Allenby St	1964	Housing Corp. & HCC	WWI heroes,Viscount Allenby	E.G. Jones was the previous owner
Annabel Pl	1958	Housing Corp. & HCC	daughter of Willoughby Norrie	
Ansford Pl	1973	W. Taylor	a previous owner,	Peter Maurice Ansford
Anthony Cres	1965	Pinewood Properties		and B. Donnelly
Bader Street	1957	Housing Corp. & HCC	war hero Douglas Bader	
Cleveland St	1959	Pineville Properties Ltd.,	a street construction firm -	Dermont Cleveland St
Dermont St	1957	Pineville Properties Ltd	employees	Dermont Cleveland
Kerrs Court				
Lee Place	1953	Housing Corp. & HCC	war hero,	U.S. Vice Admiral Willis Augustus Lee
Manor Place	1977	Brian Perry	suggested by G. Jellie. P. Pepper's wife's home in England.	Horner Pl and Dennis Pl were rejected by HCC
Montgomery Cres	1957	Housing Corp. & HCC	war hero, Bernard Law Montgomery	
Norrie Street	1962	Housing Corp. & HCC	war hero, Governor-General, Willoughby Norrie	
Perry Place	1953	Housing Corp. & HCC	war hero, Oliver Hazard Perry?	
Pine Avenue		crown grant		The name became official in 1950
Rawlings St	1953	Housing Corp. & HCC	war hero - Bernard Rawlings	
Slim Street	1957	Housing Corp. & HCC	war hero, William Joseph Slim	
St Lukes Pl	1950	Anglican Church Authority	St Luke	
Trigg Place	1958	Housing Corp. & HCC	war hero, Lloyd A. Trigg	
Willis Street	1953	Housing Corp. & HCC		
Wingate St	1954/1999	Housing Corp. & HCC	war hero Charles Orde Wingate	

== Beerescourt ==
Street name	Year	Named by owner	Named after	Other notes
Airdrie Lane				
Alanbrooke Pl	1950s c.	HCC	war hero, 1st Viscount Alanbrooke	
Anne Way	1950s	HCC	royalty	
Awatere Ave	1951	NZ Insurance Co	Awa=river, tere=swift, alongside the river	
Beerescourt Rd	1870	Capt Gerald Beere	on Beeres Fort farm. 4th Waikato Regiment, Highway Board, school committee.	Renamed Beeres Rd by special order of HCC 1900
Cardrona Road	1938	A.W. Beveridge		and D.J. Gurnell
Charles Cres	1951	Housing Corporation	royalty	
Cunningham R	1956	Housing Corp. & HCC	Admiral? 1st Viscount Andrew Cunningham	
Dalgliesh Ave	1921	Hamilton Racing Club	Dalgliesh, a member of the old coach driving firm.	He also ran the "horse bazaar' c. 1900
Elizabeth St	1951	Housing Corp. & HCC	royalty	
Galbraith Ave	1951	AB Galbraith,	eponymous?	AJ Flatt & ME Vautier
Garrick Place	1948	L.E. Crockett		
Kotahi Avenue	1920	S. Livingstone	togetherness, No.1 bridge - also called Whitiora Bridge	
MacDiarmid Rd	1947	H.J.&, L.G. Williams &	solicitor, C.L MacDiarmid who signed deed. Also P.E. Beggs	
Menzies Street	1954	E.J. & W.S. Menzies	eponymous	
Partington Pl	1961	Housing Corp. & HCC	settler Edward Robert Partington	
Philip Street	1951	Housing Corp. & HCC	royalty	
Portal Cres	1956	Housing Corp. & HCC	war hero, 1st Viscount Portal of Hungerford	
Storey Ave	1908	Hamilton Racing Club	Arthur James Storey, S Auckland Racing Club secretary, Waikato A&P	Assoc member & Farmers' Co-op founder
Vardon Rd	1908	Mrs E. Jackson	golfer, Harry Vardon?	
Vercoe Road	1936	Minnie Barbara Vercoe	early owner, G.W. Vercoe	

== Chartwell ==
Street name	Year	Named by owner	Named after	Other notes
Alker Road				
Alker West Rd				
Amethyst Pl	1976	Housing Corp. & HCC	theme of semi-precious stones	
Arran Road	1960	Housing Corp. & HCC	where Day family was from	E.C. Day, Monyquil Estate purchased by the Housing Corporation
Arthur Place	1968	Housing Corp. & HCC	a Hamilton duty officer 1945	An alternate name suggested was Urewera Place
Ascot Road	1961	Housing Corp. & HCC	suggested by R.W. Green,	original owner. Another suggestion was Winstone Road
Athier Avenue				
Balmoral Rise				
Balmoral St	1966	Housing Corp. & HCC	theme of castles	
Bankwood Rd	1908	John Gordon	Bankwood House farm	house, built 1894 by M.G. Farrer. Legalized in 1964 by the Bankwood Property
Bellmont St	1967	Len Scott, Ascot Downs	rhyme with Claremont, family home	
Bellwood Pl	1969	Housing Corporation	track coach, Jim Bellwood	
Braithwaite Av	1965	David Braithwaite	mother, Mrs N.K. Braithwaite	Regent Development Company Ltd
Breidis Place	1969	Housing Corporation	track & field coach	Valdemars Briedis
Capper Cres				
Carlyle Avenue	1963	Chedworth Park Co. Ltd	English heritage	Chedworth originally suggested Sutcliffe Ave
Carrs Road	1917	Carr family	eponymous?	The road was later developed and legalised by HCC and officially named Carrs Road
Cascade Place	1913	Housing Corporation &	R.W. Green	
Chamberlain Place	1968	Housing Corporation	coaches & athletes,	Marise Chamberlain
Charlbury Pl	2002	Chedworth Court Ltd	English place	
Charmaine Cr	1959	F&C Donny	Charmaine Donny, Frank's sister	
Chartwell Cr	1962	Chartwell Properties Ltd	eponymous	wanted to use was Cobham Dr, but HCC had planned Cobham Dr SH1
Chelsea Place	1974	FPL Donny	naming competition	They liked the name because it reminded them of the Chelsea Flower show
Chequers Ave	1972	N.F. Taylor,		Regent Development Ltd
Claremont Ave	1968	crown grant HCC	names ending in "mont" Fen Scott, a builder/owner suggested	J.W. & Gladys Rose Chapman's original homestead was Claremont. Rejected 1968 request to extend Lamont St to Bellmont Ave, but named new portion Claremont Ave.
Coldwell Pl	1962	W.G. Coldwell		renamed Caldwell Place, to correct spelling
College Place	1965	Housing Corp. & HCC	proximity to Fairfield College	
Conway Place	1972-3	F.P.L. & D.J.M. Donny	ship he served on Conway	Oleander Place was accepted 1971, but Oleander is a bit poisonous
Couldsack Av				
Cowen Place	1978	Peerless Homes Ltd	previous owner, William Cowen.	Upland Pl was rejected by council
Crosby Road	1916	HCC	John Crosby, an early colonist	who called his property Mount Pleasant
Cussen Street	1948	Housing Corp. & HCC	Lawrence Cussen, a	Waikato District surveyor c. 1884
Dalmont Pl	1968	Charles Montague	names ending in "mont"	and Bartholomew Timbers
De Vere Cres	1964	Lynbrae Lands Ltd	a previous owner,	H. De Vere Chitty, one of the original landowners of Hukunui
Donny Ave	1959	F.P.L & G.J.M. Donny	eponymous	
Egmont St	1965	Ascot Downs Ltd	names ending in "mont"	
Ellerslie Ave	1974	Chedworth Park Ltd	named after the racecourse	
Ellsworth Pl	2001	Chedworth Court Ltd	books about England	
Elmira Ave	1969	Housing Corp. & HCC	R.W. Green was the original owner.	Mrs Green's brother lived on Elmira Ave, Palmerston North
Emerald Pl	1977	Housing Corp. & HCC	theme of semi-precious stones	
Epsom Place				
Eucalyptus Pl	1963	PTY Homes	tree	1964 request to change name agreed, but a change has not occurred
Fend Street	1961	Becker Brothers Ltd		
Fernleigh St	1969	R.W. Green	in Waiuku, where he met his future wife	
Freemont St	1967	Ascot Downs Ltd	names ending in "mont"	
Gosset Ave				
Greenhill Rd	1902	NZ Land Association	over a hill that is green	
Guillaume St				
Halberg Cres	1968	Housing Corp. & HCC	coaches & athletes, Murray Halberg	
Hatric Road				
Heritage Ave				
Hubert Place				
Hukanui Road	1864	crown grant	area was known as Hukanui	
Jennifer Place	1967	Lynbrae Lands Ltd		
Kelly Place	1964	A.E. Kelly	eponymous?	
Keyes Street				
Kibblewhite R				
Lamont Street	1965	Len Scott, Ascot Downs Ltd	names ending in "mont"	
Lavinias Way				
Letford Road				
Libeau Road				
Lissaman Pl				
Logan Court	2001	Chedworth Court Ltd		
Lovelock Pl	1968	Housing Corp. & HCC	coaches & athletes, Jack Lovelock	
Lulu Avenue				
Lydiard Place	1968	Housing Corp. & HCC	coaches & athletes, Arthur Lydiard	
Lynden Court	1968	Rossiter Investments	former owner, Lynden Chitty	and Lynbrae Land Co
Magee Place	1968	Housing Corp. & HCC	coaches & athletes, Barry Magee	
Mayfair Ave	1959	F. Donny and C. Donny	owner once visited Mayfair	
Mcconnell La				
Mcgarridle Rd				
McIntosh St	1968	Housing Corp. & HCC	coaches & athletes, Avis McIntosh	
Meachem Rd				
Medland Pl				
Medway Place				
Milbrook Pl	2002	Chedworth Court Ltd	from interesting books about England	
Milford Place	2001	Chedworth Court Ltd	picked randomly	
Naismith St				
Ngaere Ave	1963	Bankwood Porperties		
Opal Place	1977	Housing Corp. & HCC	theme of semi-precious stones	
Pardoa Bvd				
Pearl Place	1977	Housing Corp. & HCC	theme of semi-precious stones	
Perindale Dr	1977	Brian Perry Developments Ltd	eponymous	
Pollock Drive	1965	Robert Craig Pollock	eponymous	
Popham Road				
Probert Cres				
Read Place	1968	Housing Corp. & HCC	coaches & athletes, Norman Read	Luckie of Waikato Amateur Athletic Association chose names
Rossiter Place	1968	Rossiter Investments Ltd	eponymous	
Ruapehu St	1968	Housing Corp. & HCC	mountains or a "mont"	
Ryan Avenue	1969	Housing Corp. & HCC	coaches & athletes, Kevin Ryan	
Sandford Pl	1968/1977	Commercial Hotel Ltd	HCC Deputy Engineer, Ken Sandford	
Sapphire Pl	1977	Housing Corp. & HCC	theme of semi-precious stones	
Sefton Cres	1968	Housing Corp. & HCC		
Sharpley Place	1969	R.W. Green, Housing Corporation	coaches & athletes, Frank Sharpley	
Snell Drive	1968	Housing Corp. & HCC	coaches & athletes, Peter Snell	
Squire Avenue				
St Pauls Road	1960	C. Clarke and H.G. Hall	nearby school, St Pauls Collegiate	
Stella Place				
Stoneleigh Dr	2001	Chedworth Court Ltd		
Sun Court				
Sussex Street	1963	Chedworth Park Ltd	English heritage?	
Sutcliffe Place	1963	PTY Homes Ltd.	a previous owner, Sutcliffe	owned by A.D. Murray and H.G. Webb
Swart Lane				
Tifiney Place	1977	Brian Perry	his daughter, Tifiney Perry	
Tongariro St	1968	Housing Corp. & HCC	mountains	
Trewern Ave				
Upham Place	1974	A.O. Murray and H.G. Webb owned Chedworth Park Ltd	Charles Hazlitt Upham, Victoria Cross 1941	
Voight Avenue				
Wake Street				
Watkins Street	1973-4	N.H. Henwood	Mr. Watkins	
Wattle Place	1978	Alf Steele, Peerless Homes Ltd	wattle tree on the property	
Webb Drive				
Winstone Ave	1968	Housing Corp. & HCC	Winstone products used in building	previous owners Mr & Mrs Green
Wymer Terrace	1960	Wymer	eponymous	
Wyrall Way				

== Chedworth ==
Street name	Year	Named by owner	Named after	Other notes
Aotea Place	1964	Chedworth Park Ltd	Aotea canoe	
Bernard Street	1963	HCC & Chedworth Park	Governor General,	Bernard Ferguson
Chedworth Ave	1963	Chedworth Park Co., Ltd	eponymous	They purchased the 111 acres in 1959
Cooper Place				
Fleming Place	1969	Housing Corp. & HCC	Charles Fleming	
Gerrand Place	1969	Gerrand Feature Homes	eponymous	
Hillary Street	1963	Chedworth Park Ltd	Sir Edmund Hillary	
Hooker Avenue	1964	Chedworth Park Ltd, Hooker, Hooker & Kingston	a previous owner,	
Lynwood Place	1963-4	Chedworth Park Ltd	English heritage names	
McLaren Place	1971	Chedworth Park Ltd	racing driver Bruce McLaren	
McMeekan	1974	Chedworth Park Ltd	Dr C.P. McMeekan, Animal	Research Station superintendent 1943-1961
Pickering Cres	1969	Housing Corp. & HCC	William Henry Pickering	
Ruby Court	1999	Chedworth Court Ltd		
Rutherford Street	1963	Chedworth Park Ltd	Ernest Rutherford	
Tudor Crescent	1963	A.D. Murray and H.G. Webb owned Chedworth Park Ltd	English heritage	

== Claudelands ==
Street name	Year	Named by owner	Named after	Other notes
Bailey Avenue		LM & LP Roach	Bailey was the maiden name of Lawrence Michael Roach's wife, Thora, one of the owners of the land. The road was named after her.	Waikato CC 1901-2
Brooklyn Road	1879	crown grant	suggested by McGuder after old Brooklyn Farm	Renamed Hukanui Rd by HCC special order as name was repeated
Claudelands Rd	1964		Original landowner Francis Richard Claude	Until 1964, Claudelands Road ended at Grey St. Work on the road extension and bridge connecting to Victoria St began in 1966 and opened in October 1968. The very eastern end of Claudelands Road became part of the Cosmopolitan Club's grounds
Daisy Street	1924	Pearson Brothers		
East Street	1920	crown grant	Captain Alfred William East	
George Street	1911	Mrs Marguerite Josephine O'Neill	George Primrose, son of her neighbour,	John Primrose
Gillies Ave	1919	lawyer, Harvey Gillies	eponymous	
Griffiths Place	1956	HCC	HBC Cr, A.G. Griffiths?	
Kitchener St	1911	John Primrose	Lord Kitchener	renamed the John St end of the street by special order of HCC in 1916
O'Neill Street	1909	Mr & Mrs Lewis O'Neill	family name Lewis O'Neill barrister	established 1875
Oakley Ave	1910	J.R. Self		
Pearsons Ave	1924	Pearson brothers,	E.J. Pearson militia settler	
Piako Road	1879	crown grant	Māori tribe	In 1879 extended into what is now Claudelands Showgrounds
Short Street	1924	Pearson Brothers	length of street	
St Clair Court				
Stanley Street	1916	Primrose Family Estate	Stanley Primrose, killed at Galipolli	
Sullivan Cres				
Sullivan Road				
Thames Street	1879/1915	Andrew Primrose	River Thames, England?	
Union Street	1910	T. Primrose		
Young Street	1910	NZ Dairy Association	mayor Alexander Young	

== Deanwell ==
Street name	Year	Named by owner	Named after	Other notes
Anderson Road	1963	D.M. Mackenzie	Waipā County engineer	
Deanwell Ave	1969	Deanwell Properties		
Joanna Place	1969	Deanwell Properties Ltd	daughter - Archie Mason	
Leslie Place	1975-76	Mr C. Lynch, Lugton Lands		
Mabian Cres	1962	Deanwell Properties Ltd	children	D.M. McKenzie's children's names - Malcolm, Anne, Barrie & Ian
Margaret Place	1969-70c	Deanwell Properties	daughter of John Pepper	
Marion Place	1969-70c	Deanwell Properties	daughter of John Pepper	Lugton Lands and Resthills Ltd
Pamela Place	1969	Deanwell Properties Ltd	daughter of John Pepper's,	associate of company.
Rhonda Ave	1969	Deanwell Properties,	daughter of John Pepper	PTY Homes, Spaceline Homes
Rosalind Street	1969	Deanwell Properties Ltd, PTY Homes	daughter of Archie Mason	owner of Spaceline Homes
Saxby's Road	1910s	crown grant		
Stan Heather Dr	2013	CKC Holdings	Long serving Waikato Rugby Union manager	Originally Stan Heather Park (est 1953), sold and subdivided as housing in 2013, Stan Heather Dr is the main road
Susan Place	1969	Deanwell Properties	daughter of John Pepper	Pepper associated with coy.

== Dinsdale ==
Street name	Year	Named by owner	Named after	Other notes
Aberdeen Drive	1971	Goodall family. Chartwell pprties	owner's descendant's town in Scotland	originally suggested Richmont Dr - Richmont Heights for 70 years
Aberfoyle St	1956	F. Foote	where he emigrated from	
Amanda Ave	1973	crown grant	daughter of original owner, P.V. Harkness	Renamed Gibson Rd 1978 by HCC and Prestige Homes Ltd
Ashbourne La				
Beaumaris Pl	1971	Prestige Homes Ltd	theme of British castles	
Beehive Lane				
Birch Hill Place	1973	Parkdale Developments Ltd		
Blakewell Lane				
Bremworth Ave	1972	Goodall Family	carpets	Bremworth Wilton carpets first advertised in 1961
Caernarvon St	1971	Prestige Homes Ltd	theme of British Castles	
Carlingford Rse				
Colquhoun Pl	1977	L.C. & E.F. Robinson	race horse	Cotton Place was suggested
Cosmith Lane				
Courtney Ave	1971	Goodall family	wife Grace from Wellington	1969 suggestion of Westerneigh Cres, but wanted change by 1971
Culverdon St	1973	Parkdale Developments Ltd		
Dalton Cres	1971	Goodall family	carpets, family from Somerset	
Deborah Place	1980	Lugton Lands Co		
Derbyshire Pl				
Dinsdale Road	1890	Thomas Dinsdale	eponymous	
Dovedale Place	1976	L.C. and E.F. Robinson	horse	Frederick Place was originally suggested
Dunvegan Pl	1973	PTY Homes,	theme of British castles	also Parkdale Developments
Edith Place	1973	PTY Homes		also Parkdale Developments
Esmae Place	1976	L.C. and E.F. Robinson	eponymous Esmae Robinson	
Evelyn Court	1977	Grasslands Farms Ltd	wife of R.B.K. Gardiner,	Evelyn Gardiner, who owned Grassland Farms
Fiona Place	1972	C.H. Leong	his daughter, Fiona	
Frederick Drive	1965	PTY Homes Ltd		
Gibson Road	1920	Waipā County Council	original owner,	William Gibson, who donated 400 acres to WCC in 1902
Glamis Avenue	1971	Prestige Homes Ltd	theme of British castles	
Glenmorgan Pl	1973	L.C. and E.F. Robinson,	Scottish theme	Paramount Builders
Goodall Street	1966	Goodall family	eponymous	& Peerless Homes
Grove Place	1974	Alf Steele,	grove of Kahikatea trees	Peerless Homes & Goodall family left trees standing
Harlech Place	1977	Prestige Homes Ltd	theme of British Castles	
Harold Lane				
Hartington La				
Hazelwood Ave	1969-70	Russell Googall	tree	
Irene Crescent	1967	Goodall family	Grace Irene Goodall	
Jasmine Ave	1974	Goodall family	plant	
Jessica Court				
Johnson Street	1936	Rothwell and Brooks		
Karen Crescent	1977	Lynbrae Lands Ltd	daughter of owner	Grassland Farms Ltd (R.B.K. Gardiner)
Kenilworth Pl	1971	Prestige Homes Ltd	theme of castles	
Knightsbridge Pl	1971	Russell Goodall	English heritage, carpet	Knightsbridge carpets were new in 1958
Krippner Place	1974	R.B. Lugton Ltd.	original owner, W.P. Krippner	D.G.J. Bunting and Beerescourt Investments,
Lachlan Drive	1974	McLachlan,	eponymous	Chartwell Properties Ltd & L.C. Robinsons
Lancaster St	1974	R.C. Salmond		
Leonard Place	1976	Leonard C.	eponymous	
Leong Avenue	1972	C.H. Leong and L.F. Robinson	eponymous	
Lethborg Street	1970-71	Lynbrae Lands Ltd	Eric Lethborg, HCC building inspector	
Madison Place	1974	Russell Goodall	Madison Avenue?	
Magenta Place	1969	William Goodall	colour	
Matlock Lane				
Melanie Court				
Melva Street	1977	Prinn-Sweeney	named after the owner's wife, Melva Prinn	Renamed Minogue St
Michael Avenue	1969	Goodall family	Michael Maynell, family friend	
Monique Place				
Montana Place	1975	Fountain City Builders		
Mountbatten Pl	1974	Brian Perry Developments Ltd	Louis Mountbatten	
Olwyn Green				
Olwyn Terrace	1923	Waikato Farmers Supply Stores		
Paget Lane	1998	G.W. Paget	eponymous	
Phoenix Place	1974	P.V. Harkness		
Poaka Avenue	1971	Goodall Family	bird	
Pygmalion Place	1975	PTY Homes Ltd	a previous owner, G.B. Shaw. PTY thought	Pygmalion, by George Bernard Shaw represented Mr Shaw
Rachel Place				
Railside Place				
Ranui Street				
Rhode Street	1912	W.S.Higgins		
Riccarton Place	1971	Goodall family	carpets, Feltex range	Riccarton Feltex carpet factory opened in 1948
Robyn Place	1974 -1975	Beazley Homes Ltd		
Ross View Terr	1969	Goodall Family	Ms Ross, wife of Thompson, a family friend	
Rothesay Place	1973	Parkdale Developments,	theme of castles	PTY. Homes
Rothwell Street	1940-1950	Rothwell and Brooks	eponymous, Rothwell Block	
Russleigh Drive	1968	Goodall family & G. Jellie	owner, Russell Goodall didn't want Russell Dr	
Salmond Place	1974		named by R.C. Salmond	
Sandalwood Dr	1977	Fountain City Builders	Mrs Dorothy Kells wanted to name it after a tree,	but chose Lancewood, a name already taken
Sheila Place	1979 - 80	R.B. Hollinger, Lynbrae Lands L	female names	
Shelley Jane Pl				
Stirling Place	1971-3	McLachlan, Chartwell Properties	theme of British castles	
Summit Terrace	1970	Goodall family	on a summit	
Taotahi Avenue				
Tattersfield Pl	1973	Will and Russell Goodall	English heritage - carpets, Tattersfield Ltd started in	Auckland in 1912. Carpet squares were known by 1927.
The Dales				
Thomson Avenue	1955	J. Thomson	eponymous	
Vincent Place	1976	L.C. and E.F. Robinson	a previous owner, Frederick Vincent Cutts	
Walker Terrace	1959	Frank Herbert Co. Ltd	Dr Samuel Walker, NZ Cross?	Waikato Armed Constabulary 1869
Wedgewood Pl	1969	Goodall family	Josiah Wedgewood	
Whatawhata Rd	1879	crown grant		
Winning Terrace	1979	Lynbrae Lands Ltd		

== Enderley ==
Street name	Year	Named by owner	Named after	Other notes
Bevan Lane				
Blake Street	1959	Housing Corp. & HCC	poets William Blake	
Blue Cedar La				
Brooke Way	1961	Housing Corp. & HCC	poets Rupert Brooke	A 1974 map shows the road on the 15 Coleridge Dr May 2021 line of a walkway.
Brooke Way				
Browning Way	1959	Housing Corp. & HCC	poets	Robert and Elizabeth Barrett Browning
Burns Court	1959	Housing Corp. & HCC	poets Robert Burns	
Buxton Court				
Byron Road	1959	Housing Corp. & HCC	poets George Gordon Noel Byron	
Coleridge Drive	1959	Housing Corp. & HCC	poets Samuel Coleridge	
Cowper Way	1959	Housing Corp. & HCC	poets William Cowper	
Dryden Road	1959	Housing Corp. & HCC	poets John Dryden	
Eliot Street	1959	Housing Corp. & HCC	poets Thomas Stearns Eliot	
Emerson Place	1959	Housing Corp. & HCC	poets Ralph Waldo Emerson	
Enderley Ave	1913	Shoard		renamed Muriel Street in 1915
Fifth Avenue	1913	F. Cooper-Smith		
Gillett Lane				
Halifax Street	1915	Shoard	Halifax?	
Herrick Way	1959	Housing Corp. & HCC	poets, Robert Herrick	
Insoll Avenue	1908	T.B. Insoll	owner was a Waikato CC clerk	
John Street	1913	F. Cooper Smith		
Keats Crescent	1959	Housing Corp. & HCC	poets John Keats	
Landor Way	1959	Housing Corp. & HCC	poets Walter Savage Landor	
Mardon Road	1920-30c	James Primrose		
Marlowe Place	1959	Housing Corp. & HCC	poets Christopher Marlowe	
Masefield Drive	1959	Housing Corp. & HCC	poets John Edward Masefield	
Newport Place	1968	Roach and Casey	golf courses, or golfers, Newport Golf Club	
Orchard Avenue	1986/1968	J.A. Roach and Casey The ride is sited in the area the Roach family grew a small orchard and is likely named after that. (Theorchard owned by W.J. Morrows was situated on the corner of East St and Tramway Rd.)		
Rigter Place				
Sandringham Rd	1968	J.A Roach	his wife said it was probably Sandringham	
Shakespeare Ave	1959	Housing Corp. & HCC	poets William Shakespeare	
Shelley Court	1959	Housing Corp. & HCC	poets Percy Bysshe Shelley	
Southey Way	1959	Housing Corp. & HCC	poets Robert Southey	
Spenser Road	1959	Housing Corp. & HCC	poets Edmund Spenser	
Springfield Cr	1964	G. Williamson,		District Public Trustee
Tennyson Road	1959	Housing Corp. & HCC	poets Alfred Tennyson	
Waikai Close				
Wordsworth Cres	1958	Housing Corp. & HCC	poets William Wordsworth	

== Fairfield ==
Street name	Year	Named by owner	Named after	Other notes
Alfred Street	1940	Robert H Coombs	previous owner,	Alfred William East
Anson Ave	1926	Kate Ferrer		
Armitage Pl	1949	Housing Corp. & HCC	George Henry Armitage?	sergeant of #2 company schoolmaster
Augusta St	1963	Roach family	golf	Augusta National Golf Club
Balloch Street	1920	Edward Robert Partington		
Banbury Cres	1926	Isabell Kate Farrer	English names?	renamed Banbury Rd in 1965 by HCC
Bettina Road	1913	H. Paltridge	daughter	
Boundary Rd	1879	crown grant	Hamilton E / Claudelands boundary	Became a legal street in 1928
Butler Place	1962	Housing Corp. & HCC	poets William Butler Yeats	
Casey Avenue	1917	J. Casey	eponymous	The road was extended in 1918 into the J. Primrose estate
Casper Street	1962	L.M., L.D. & T.M. Roach	golf, list of famous names	Billy Casper
Clarkin Road	1915	John Clarkin	eponymous	
Claude Street	1917-18	Francis Richard Claude	eponymous	He had 354 acres by 1884, including A.F. East's estate of 300 acres
Dalethorpe Av	1938	A.R. & B.M Clark		
Davey Place	1949	Housing Corp. & HCC	Cr E.J. Davey	
Douglas Cres	1953	Housing Corp. & HCC	Dr H.S. Douglas,	Waikato Hospital superintendent (1899-1919)
Fairfield Br				
Fairfield Road	1948-9	Housing Corp. & HCC	Fairfield Dairy Farm,	which occupied the section of Hamilton now called Fairfield
Gardiner Pl	1949	Housing Corp. & HCC	David Gardiner, a pioneer	
Golden Place	1960	Housing Corp. & HCC	Father John Golden,	Catholic priest
Haultain St	1948	Housing Corp. & HCC	Theodore Minet Haultain	
Heaphy Terrace			Charles Heaphy	Originally Albert St - Gibbon's Creek gully. Grey St ran from Sillary St - Albert St. 1924 road extended and Heaphy Terr moved to its current position and southend became Grey St
Hockin Place	1950	Housing Corp. & HCC	Dr Hockin?	Waikato Hospital superintendent
Holland Road	1949	Housing Corp. & HCC	Sidney George Holland	
Howden Road	1922	P.G. Western	Cr Henry Herbert Howden	
Hume Place	1952	Housing Corp. & HCC	Cr J. Hume	
Ingleton Terr	1926	Isabelle Kate Farrer	English names	
Kenney Cres	1950	Housing Corp. & HCC	Dr Gordon Geils Kenney,	Waikato Hospital first superintendent
Kensington Pl	1964	R.W. Green	British place	
Le Quesne Pl	1949/1964	Housing Corp. & HCC	P. Le Quesne,	Hamilton Hotel and a member of the Hamilton E Board
Marne Street	1916	Mrs Sarah Smith	WWI Battle of the Marne	
Marshall St	1950	Housing Corp. & HCC	first Waikato white settler?	Charles Marshall
Martin Street	1955	PP Independent Motors	owner Martin McNicol	Hamilton Ltd
McNicol St	1957	Fairfield Properties	a previous owner,	Martin McNicol
McPherson Pl	1952	Housing Corp. & HCC	Captain James McPherson	
Moncrief Ave	1937	Mrs A.E. Corbett	Lieutenant John Moncrieff?	
Moule Place	1952	Housing Corp. & HCC	Col William Moule,	4th Waikato Regiment commander, 1863-4 and first JP in Hamilton
Oxford Street	1921	John Paterson	Oxford?	
Paul Crescent	1949	Housing Corp. & HCC	William Henry Paul,	active in civic affairs
Peachgrove R	1879	crown grant	peach grove was near	Frances St
Ranfurly Ave	1926	Isabell Kate Farrer,	Governor-General?	Uchter John Mark Knox 5th Earl of Ranfurly
Riverview Terr	1940s	Captain East's militia grant, later R.W. Gummer	Riverview was Andrew Casey's estate	A short spur off Tamihana Ave was part of Flo St. That was re-aligned into the new Riverview Terr c.1954 as Bridgeview Terr.
Roseburg St	01/10/62	L.M, L.P, and T.M Roach	golf course - Roseburg	
Ross Cres	1949	Housing Corp. & HCC	Hilda Ross	
Rumney St	1955	K.B Mackenzie	previous owner's home,	Martin McNicol was from Rumney
Sale Street	1913	H. Paltridge		
Sare Crescent	1949	Housing Corp. & HCC	Cr George Sare, 1901–03	
Searancke Pl	1948	Housing Corp. & HCC	William Searancke?	
Strowan Ave	1938	A.R & B.M. Clarke		
Tamihana Avenue	1937	Andrew Casey	Wiremu Tamihana	Originally it extended to Casey Ave only to what is now the end of Riverview Terr. Then to River Rd was Flo St, changed to Tamihana after 1954 formation of Riverview Terr.
Tranmere Rd	1948	Housing Corp. & HCC		
Treloar Street	1965	Housing Corp. & HCC	Cr J. Treloar?	
Verel Street	1920	Herbert Winter and		E.R. Partington
Walter Street	1940	Robert H. Coombes		
Wesley Court				
Williams Pl	1950	A.R. Priest	original owner	
Winter Street	1920		eponymous, Herbert Winter	
Woodstock R	1937	Isabella Kate Ferrer	Woodstock?	
Yeats Cres	1958	Housing Corp. & HCC	poets Yeats	

== Fairview Downs ==
Street name	Year	Named by owner	Named after	Other notes
Ada Place	1998	Chedworth Park Ltd	grandmother's first name	
Alderson Rd	1936-40	A.J. Thompson	previous owner, Alderson family	
Aldona Pl	2000	Chedworth Park Ltd	owner's family	
Aldona Pl				
Aria Court	1998	Chedworth Park	a close friend	
Benson Rd				
Betley Cres	1970	Alf Steel,	previous owner, Betley Farm	Peerless Homes Ltd
Caistor Street	1962	D.M. McKenzie	RAF Caistor where he served during the war. Group of streets including	Hendon Rd, Caistor St and Reeves Cl. The group is south of Powells Rd which separates them from Fairview Downs - they are not Fairview Ds
Craig Place	1970	Alf Steel	Nephew, Craig Steel	
Drake Place				
Erika Place	1970	Alf Steel,	daughter, Erika Steel	Peerless Homes Ltd
Ernest Road	1998	Chedworth Park Ltd	grandfather of owner	
Fairview St	1967	Alf Steel	made the area sound more attractive	
Hendon Road	1962	D.M. McKenzie	RAF Hendon	he served in the Metropolitan Communications Squadron in the war. Group of streets including Caistor St
Kimiora Cl	1998	Chedworth Park Ltd	a close friend	
Newfield Dr	1998	Chedworth Park Ltd	The old fields of the developer	became the new fields of the subdivision.
Northolt Rd	1962	D.M. McKenzie	RAF Northolt	he served in there in the war. Group of streets including Caistor St
Plymouth Pl				
Pounamu Pl	1998	Chedworth Park Ltd	cul-de-sac in the shape developer's family's	greenstone pendant
Powells Rd	1917c	John Powell	said to have been formed by	Frederick & William Powell - maybe sons, to improve family farm access
Radiata St	1974	Alf Steel,	building theme	Peerless Homes Ltd
Raleigh Ave				
Raymond St	1970-71	Alf Steel, Peerless Homes Ltd	son	
Reeves Cl				
Riverton Pl				
Rogers Pl				
Rutland St	1970	Alf Steel,	randomly picked out of a book	Peerless Homes Ltd
Sadler St	1970	Alf Steel,	a company director	Peerless Homes Ltd
Sarindah Pl				
Smart Place	1974	Alf Steel,	wife's maiden name	Peerless Homes Ltd
St Kilda Pl	1962	D.M. McKenzie	farm he was from	
Terence St	1965	R.B. Lugton	Terence Daly partner	Daly Street was rejected by HCC
Thorpe St	1970	Peerless Homes	A. Thorpe insurance agent helped the company	
Tramway Rd	1890s		a tramway in the vicinity	

== Fitzroy ==
Street name	Year	Named by owner	Named after	Other notes
Bostonkip Cres				
Branca Close				
Briannarose Dr				
Carolyn Place	1967	Fletcher Development	randomly chosen from a list of names	
Cromwell Drive				
Dixon Road	1928-30	Dixon family	eponymous	was in Waipā County when it was named
Echobank Pl				
Edgeview Cres				
Faiping Road				
Fitzroy Avenue	1965	Parkdale Plateau Ltd	Captain Robert Fitzroy?	
Gainsford Road				
Hahawaru Lane				
Heke Lane				
Inuwai Street				
Ladeira Place				
Malabar Street	1969	Fletcher Development	randomly chosen	
Marjoriefield Ms				
McEwan Place	1980	Beazley Homes Ltd	Hamilton land owner, Alexander Mc Ewen	
McKain Place				
Mila Paige Cl				
Moiras Lane				
Patrick Place	1964-5c	Parkdale Plateau Ltd		
Peacockes Road	1899	E.F. Peacocke	eponymous	
Pear Tree Lane				
Plateau Drive				
Riley Place	1980	Beazley Homes Ltd HCC	a previous owner, James Riley Houston Ashman, 1951–76	
Sapling Lane				
Stubbs Road				
Tarao Lane				
Te Tiireke Drive				
Waiora Terrace	1971	Waipā County Council	entrance to water treatment station	"waiora" is Māori for, golden water
Waterford Road	1965	Parkdale Plateau Ltd		
Weston Lea Dr				
Yanicks Cres				

== Flagstaff ==
Street name	Year	Named by owner	Named after	Other notes
Achilles Rise				
Admiral Cres				
Alandale Ave				
Amaril Lane				
Amberley Pl				
Amokura Cres				
Anchor Close				
Anna Jean Cr				
Arie Lane				
Arncliffe Terr				
Ashford Mews				
Audrey Place				
Azimuth Place				
Aztec Place				
Bandon Street	1907	John McCarthy		
Batten Drive				
Beaufort Place				
Bellona Place	1997	CDL Land NZ Ltd	WWII ships	Bellona light cruiser
Bentley Rise				
Bos Crescent				
Bosun Place				
Bouverie Cres				
Brad Avenue				
Bramber St				
Bree Place				
Briarwood Dr				
Brywood Rise				
Buckley Way				
Calypso Rise				
Cambrian La				
Canaandale Dr				
Carr End Lane				
Cashmere Pl				
Castleton Way				
Cheltenham Cl				
Claymore Place	1997	DCL Land NZ Ltd	WWII ships Claymore from Northern Steamship for parts,	converted 1942 in Auckland Claymore
Clewer Lane				
Commodore Av				
Cordelia Court				
Cornice Place				
Crest Rise				
Cumberland Dr				
Delia Court				
Derwent Place				
Diomede Glade	1997	DCL Land NZ Ltd	WWII NZ Navy ships, HMNZS Diomede was a cruiser that was retired in 1943	
Discovery Drive				
Drower Glen				
Dulverton Rise				
Durham Hts				
Easby Way				
Eclipse Rise				
Egton Lane				
Endeavour Ave				
Ensign Place				
Eskdale Lane				
Everleigh Court				
Falcon Court				
Farnah Green				
Featherstone Drive				
Fernwater Pl				
Gallants Place				
Gallery Grove				
Gambia Grove	1997	DCL Land NZ Ltd	WWII NZ ships, HMNZS Gambia	
Genoa Close				
Glaisdale Cres				
Grosvenor Gns				
Halcione Close				
Hall Lane				
Hall Street	1907	Jolly family	town hall	
Halyard Close				
Hampshire Ct				
Hancock Drive				
Handale Lane				
Hare Puke Dr				
Harewood Way				
Harrier Court				
Hawtry Lane				
Helen June Ave				
Helenslee Ct				
Hensley Cres				
Highview Ct				
Horizon Place				
Jason Lane				
Joseph Lovett				
Karl Michael Cr				
Kelly Maree Cr				
Kemble Place				
Kendall Place				
Kentwood Pl				
Keston Cres				
Killegray Close	1997	CDL Land NZ Ltd	WWII NZ Navy ships	
Leander Place				
Lighter Place				
Limber Hill				
Longbow Terr				
Lynn Lane				
Magellan Rise				
Maia Place				
Makepeace Pl				
Margrove La				
Maru Way				
Mataroa Cres				
Mccorquindale Dr				
Meadowfield St				
Meridian Place				
Michael Terrence Pl				
Miharo Cres				
Millennium Hts				
Miranda Place	2012			
Munro Place				
Nicks Way				
Nicola Jean Pl				
Northbrook Glen				
Oakridge Gr				
Onukutara Pl				
Paritai Place				
Pascal Place				
Pennant Place				
Purser Cres				
Retallick Place				
Ridgedale Cr				
Rigg Place				
Ripple Lane				
River Elm				
Rivercove La				
Riverlinks La				
Riverpoint Gl				
Riverside La				
Roberts Way				
Rose Berry Cr				
Roy Hilton Dr				
Ryedale Road				
Santiago Pl				
Selby Mews				
Sentinel Court				
Spinnaker Drive				
Sutherland Court				
Sydney Place				
Sylvester Road	1907	C. Sylvester	eponymous	
Te Huia Drive				
Telford Place				
Tennille Street				
The Haven				
The Link				
The Meadows Drive				
The Rocks				
Tofts Lane				
Toi Toi Place				
Trauzer Place				
Trent Lane				
Trinidad Place				
Tuirangi Street	1997	CD Land NZ	WWII NZ Navy ships - a wooden ship used to haul frozen meat	
Vanquish Pl				
Vantage Place				
Viking Lane				
Wetherby Rd				
Wishbone Ct				
Wisteria Place				
Witehira Way				
Woodburn Ave				
Woodland Dr				
Woodridge Dr				

== Forest Lake ==
Street name	Year	Named by owner	Named after	Other notes
Bolmuir Road	1949	R.J. Bollard and Muir		
Christie Street	1958	Housing Corp. & HCC	a previous owner, E.L.B. Christie	
Forest Lake Rd	1910	Dr John Carey	owner's homestead	It was the first road in the area
Garnett Avenue	1912	Hamilton Racing Club		renamed Brookfield Ave in 1941
Hinton Avenue	1949	B.R. Marx	T. Hinton chairman of Waikato CC 1929-32	
Hobson Street	1917	NZ Home Builders Ltd	Captain William Hobson	
Holden Avenue	1948	P. Bollard and Muir	old Hamiltonian, M.J. Holden	
Holloway Place	1961	Holloway Farms Ltd	eponymous	
Huia Avenue	1912	J.W. Walsh	bird	renamed Corey Street in 1937 HCC
Kingsway Cres	1951	Kingsway Homes Ltd	eponymous	
Kiwi Avenue	1912	J.W. Walsh		renamed Herries St by order of HCC in 1937
Longford Court				
Mews Place				
Mitcham Avenue	1909	J.W. Walsh		
Moore Street	1950	Housing Corp. & HCC		
Ridout Street	1920	Frank Jolly	Mary Beale's grandmother on the Jolly side had the name Ridout.	Private Jesse Ridout died in battle in 1864
Rose Street	1917	New Zealand Builders Ltd		
Seifert Street	1960	Al Seifert	eponymous	
Steele Road	1921	Hamilton Racing Club	Captain William Steele, 4th Waikato Regiment?	
Tui Avenue	1912/1937	J.W. Walsh	renamed McKenzie St 1937 by HCC, when these streets named after native birds	
Walsh Street	1912	J.W. Walsh	eponymous	
Westney Place	1955	L.A. Hyde		

== Frankton ==
Street name	Year	Named by owner	Named after	Other notes
Allen Street	1913	Jolly Family	mayor of Frankton	C.E.H. Allen? 1912-1916
Arawa Street	1917	Jolly family		
Astor Avenue				
Avon Street	1923	Cooper and J.W. Edgecumbe		
Aztec Place				
Bandon Street	1907	John McCarthy		
Belfast Place	1973	L.B. Street Construction	where family emigrated from	
Blackburn St	1912	W.S. Higgins	W. Blackburn & W.A. Graham?	
Burrows Place	1976	G.P. Day	a previous owner, Burrow	
Campbell Street	1914	D.L. Smith		The subdivision it is located in was started in 1907
Charlies Way				
Charlotte Cres				
Chilcott Road				
Colombo Street	1907	John McCarthy		
Commerce St	1900	HCC	main street	renamed Main Street 1926
Corum Place				
Devon Road	1906	Mrs Jolly		originally named Devon Street
Domain View L				
Dudley Terrace	1907	Jolly family	Francis (Frank) B. Jolly's son Dudley	1913 ran Norton Rd-Roach /Rimu St to the cemetery
Duke Street	1912	W.S. Higgins	Marmaduke St John Paxton, surveyor	renamed Myrtle St in the 1930s by special order of HCC
Edgar Street				
Ellis Street	1907	John McCarth	mayor John William Ellis	
Empire Street	1907	Jolly family	British empire names in area	
Epping Place				
Fowlers Avenue	1938	D.W Kirkby,	Fowler, 1930s Domain Board	AB & Russell Matthews
Fraser Street	1920	Jolly family		
French Street	1917	Jolly Family	General French	renamed Foch St in 1917 as residents complained. Names in this area related to WWII; was French St in 1935
Gary John Lane				
Glennis Place				
Goodfellow Pl				
Grasslands Pl	1975	Grasslands Farms	eponymous	Industrial Estate
Green Street	1912	Holmes, Cook	A.W. Green?	Ruakura Research Station manager. Not legalised until 1961
Greenwood St	1907	John McCarthy		Prior to the 1970s ringroad ran only from Massey St to Killarney Rd
Haig Street	1907-1920	Jolly family	Lord Haig	
Hall Lane				
Hall Street	1907	Jolly family	town hall	
Hawk Street	1958-60	NZR	Charles Henry Hawk	, NZR resident engineer for Hamilton in 1945
Higgins Road	1912	W.S. Higgins	eponymous	
High Street	1915	Jolly family		
Irvine Street	1912	W.S. Higgins	owner of a pharmacy on Victoria St	
Islington Street	1913	Jolly family	governor Lord Islington?	
Joffre Street	1917	Jolly family	WWI theme, Marshall Joffre	
Jolly Street	1917	Jolly family	eponymous	
Kahikatea Drive	1912	Holmes & Crook (Grace St)	tree	Late 1960s/early 70s ringroad joined Greenwood St - Ohaupo Rd. After 1971 opened to Tuikaramea Rd
Kākā Street	1920-25	NZR	bird	not legally recognized until 1972
Kea Street	1920-25c	NZR	bird	1972 Hamilton City Council legalised the name
Keddell Street	1904	F. Jolly	a previous owner,	Major Jackson Keddell, 4th Waikato Regiment
Kells Place				
Kent Street	1907	Jolly family	John Rodolphus Kent	
Kererū Street	1920-25c	NZR	bird	recognised until 1972 when it was legalised by Hamilton CC
Killarney Road	1910	John McCarthy	Lake Killarney?	
King Street	1904	F. Jolly		
Korimako St	1956-60	NZR	bird	
Kotuku Street	1920-25	NZR	bird	did not become the legal name until 1972
Laine Place	1979	E.W Taylor, Peerless Homes Ltd	Mrs Taylor suggested Laine	
Lake Road	1907	Jolly Family	runs to Lake Rotoroa?	
Latham Court	1977	Grasslands Farms		Industrial Estate
Lemon Street	1912	W.S. Higgins		
Lincoln Street				until 1970s Lincoln St ran Massey St - North St. To Forest Lake Rd it was Chilcott St. North St linked to Norton Rd. After realignment and truncating North St, all became Lincoln St with the North St remnant renamed Chilcott St
Lyon Street	1908	John H. McCarthy	Colonel W.C. Lyon,	Commanding Officer of the 3rd Waikato Regiment
Maitland Street	1914	D.L. Smith		
Makomako St	1920s c.	NZR	bird	
Mangaharakeke Drive	December 2012		includes 230 m (750 ft) bridge over Mangaharakeke Stream	
Maple Avenue	1969	Goodall family	tree	
Marama Street	1917	Dr Andrew Seymour Brewis	daughter,	Daisy Beatrice Marama Brown (1896-1992)
Mārire Avenue	1937	Housing Corp. & HCC	Māori religion,	
Mary Street	1913	Mrs Mary Beale	eponymous?	
Massey Street	1897/1879	crown grant	Rt. Hon. W.C. Massey	
Moa Crescent	1920s c.	NZR	bird	did not become legal until 1972
Moana Street	1909	Dr Andrew Seymour Brewis	daughter,	Violet Ethel Moana Brewis (1896-1976)
Newton Place				
Norton Road		crown grant - renamed Whatawhata Rd 1930-35 HCC.		originally from Tristram St to the railway. An extension from Rifle Range Rd to Rotokauri Rd, went when Avalon Dr was built
Parr Street	1922	T.H. Mills	mayor John Parr	
Paterson Street	1923	D.L. Smith		
Peregrine Place				
Piso Lane				
Pitt Street	1913	Jolly Family	William Pitt?	
Pukeko Street	1920-25c	NZR	native birds	HCC legalised the name in 1972
Queens Avenue	1917	Jolly family	British empire names in area?	later sold to NZR
Queens Park Cr				
Rawhiti Street	1918/1965	Dr Andrew Seymour Brewis	son,	Samuel Graham Rawhiti Brewis (1904-1972)
Rifle Range Rd	1908	Andre Chocqueel	rifle range from 1867	
Rua Street	1910	J.F. Vercoe	streets named 1–4 in Māori.	
Sayer Street	1911	Ramsay and Newby		
Sloper Avenue	1923	HCC	John Sloper Edgecumbe	brother of mayor George Edgecumbe
Smith Street	1920	R.H. Walls	nearby owner, D.L. Smith?	
Somerset Street	1906	Mrs Jolly		
Tahi Street	1910	J.F. Vercoe	streets named 1–4 in Māori.	
Tainui Street	1919	T.W. Maunder	Māori canoe	
Takahe Street	1960	NZR	native birds	
Taniwha Street	1922	T.H. Mills	Māori supernatural creature	
Torrington Ave	1923	Cooper and J.W. Edgecumbe	Torrington	
Toru Street	1910	J.F. Vercoe	streets named 1–4 in Māori.	
Upper Kent Pl	1919	Jolly family	extension of Kent St	
Village Quarter L				
Waterloo Street	1907	John McCarthy	Battle of Waterloo?	
Weka Street	1920-5c/ 1972	NZR from the Jolly family	bird	The names were legalised in 1972
West Street	1913	Tompkins, Cornfood and McGuire		
Wha Street	1910	J.F. Vercoe	streets named 1–4 in Māori.	
Wickham Street				
Woodward Street	1912/1969	Holmes and Crook		renamed Alice St 1969 official change
Wye Street	1923	J.W. Edgecumbe	river in Wales	

== Glenview ==
Street name	Year	Named by owner	Named after	Other notes
Acacia Cres	1962	E.G. Houchen	large stand of trees in gully	
Aloma Way				
Blackwood Cr				
Brookbank Pl	1976	L.B. Splitt	a stream runs alongside	& Taupo Totara Timber
Bruce Avenue				
Cabourne Drive				
Caesar Roose Drive				
Colstone Street	1964-65	M.T. MacDonald	theme of Scottish names	
Dawn Rise	1969-70	Chartwell Properties	wife of the owner	Dawn McLachlan, Chartwell Properties
Exeter Street	1975	E.G. Houchen	Exeter where he spent much	of his childhood before emigrating in 1883
Forth Crescent	1954-5	M.T. McDonald	Scottish theme?	
Garden Hts Ave	1968	PTY Homes, Garden Heights Ltd	subdivision name	
Glenview Terr	1958	Bruce Lugton		
Greta Street	1960	L.A. Splitt	daughter	
Gwendoline Pl	1964	L.B. Splitt	daughter	
Homestead Pl	1981	Taupo Totara Timber Co	original owners, the Dickson family,	had their homestead here
Houchens Road	1922	E.G Houchen	eponymous	
Jeanette Street	1964	L.B. Splitt	daughter, Jeanette	
John Webb Dr				
Keitha Place	1964	L.B. Splitt	daughter, Keitha	
Lambert Court	1971	Ken McDonald	Lambert family lived there	renamed Melville Court 1973
Lansdowne Cr	1973	Taupo Totara Timber Co	London directory map	
Lewis Street	1965	Pindewood Properties	a previous owner,	Lewis B. Splitt, an original owner
Lorraine Place	1969-70	McLachan, Chartwell Properties	his daughter	
MacDonald Rd	1968	M.T. MacDonald	eponymous	
Macmurdo Ave	1963	M.T. Macdonald	Scottish names	
Manapouri Pl	1967	Parkdale Development	Lake	
Oban Avenue	1965	M.T. McDonald		
Oregon Crescent				
Parkdale Place	1964-66c	Parkdale Development Co	eponymous	
Pelorus Street	1968	Harrison, Grierson and Partners, PTY Homes Ltd		
Resthill Crescent	1968	Bruce Lugton of Resthills Ltd	The "Reston family" also lived in the area	
Reynolds Drive				
Richan Street	1957	K.U. and S.U. Tomin	sons of Cr 1959-October 1965 & October 1971	and developer D.B. Mills, Richard (Rich) and Andrew (An)
Ridgeway Place	1973	Taupo Totara Timber Company	description and a pleasant ring	
Sacha Place	1970-1	L.B. Splitt	daughter	
Soo Yong Place				
Southbrook Close				
Splitt Avenue	1965	L.B. Split	eponymous	
Sunnyhills Ave	1969	McLachlan	relations in Sunnyhills, Auckland	
Surrey Lane	1999	Totara Homes	owners ancestors' county	
Te Anau Place	1969	PTY Homes Ltd	NZ lakes	
Tomin Road	1955	K & J. Tomin & E.A.Lambert	Clem Tomin is related to Clem Urlich	
Wanaka Place	1968	PTY Homes Ltd	NZ lakes	

== Grandview Heights ==
Street name	Year	Named by owner	Named after	Other notes
Angus Street				
Ayrshire Drive				
Bagust Road				
Beckham Close				
Edward Street				
Elenora Close				
Eliza Place				
Ella Place				
Evergreen Rise				
Everton Place				
Farnborough Dr	1997	Thornton Estates Ltd	English places	
Friesian Place				
Glenside Rise				
Guernsey Place				
Harrogate Place	1997	Highgrove Park Ltd	English places - classical	
Hereford Place				
Highgrove Drive	1997	Highgrove Place Ltd	subdivision name	
Jersey Place				
Limousin Place				
Max Landing				
Pointon Glade				
Rodney Street	1964	Elliott Lands Ltd & Bruce Lugton	son Rodney Lugton	
Sharaleigh Place				
Sinead Court				
Southworth Place	1998	Highgrove Park Ltd	Southworth family	

== Hamilton Central ==
Street name	Year	Named by owner	Named after	Other notes
Akona Lane				
Alexandra Street	1906	HBC	royal Queen Alexandra	originally linked Hood St to Collingwood St. After Garden Pl hill removal, Alexandra St was extended to Ward St. In 1965 HCC renamed as Barton St as they'd decided to join Barton & Alexandra across former railway land. However, the Government Life Insurance building and then Centre Place Mall were built. In 1977 the name reverted. Alexandra St underground Car Park opened in 1986, when Ward St to car park became Worley Pl
Alma Street	1894	crown grant	Crimean battle of the Alma?	renamed Eugenie Pl 1912 by HBC
Anglesea Street	1864/1964	crown grant	Henry William Paget, 1st Marquess of Anglesey?	Anglesea St South was south of Collingwood St. The section north of Garden Place Hill was Selkirk St, named by HBC in 1864. After the removal of Garden Pl Hill, Selkirk St was renamed, Anglesea St by HCC special order
Anzac Parade				Previously named Bridge Street
Arch Way				
Barton Street				Charles Barton was mayor 1887-88
Bridge Street	1928	HCC		renamed Richmond St special order, as there were two. Richmond St by Isaac Coates after his home town
Bryce Lane	1998	HCC Roads and Traffic	manager	parallel to Victoria St, known locally as Bryce Lane for years
Bryce Street	1910		John Bryce Minister	renamed Grey St when Heaphy Terr renamed Grey St East
Caro Street	1940	HCC	mayor Harold David Caro	
Casabella La				
Clarence St	1864		4th Duke of Clarence	
Clifton Road			supervisor Ruakura Station?	E. Clifton chief inspector of livestock 1901. Renamed Little London St officially changed 1913.
Collingwood St	pre 1895	crown grant,	1st Baron Collingwood	HBC & district surveyors, Graham and Blackburn
Dunsford Ms				
Fow Street	1916	H.T. Gillies	mayor John Robert Fow	Developed as part of the Palmerston Estate, including an infilled gully
Garden Place	1882c			removal of Garden Place hill was completed in 1940
Grantham St	1864	crown grant	Grantham, Lincs?	
Hamilton Pde	1864	crown grant		no exit road but the walkway continues alongside the river
Hammond St	1916	H.T. Gillies	mayor,	Developed as part of the Palmerston Estate. John Edwin Hammond
Harwood St	1913	Arthur Swarbrick	Charles William Harwood	
Hillsborough T	1895			
Hood Street	1864			
Knox Street	1900s	crown grant	mayor John Knox	
Leaf Lane				
Little London L				
Liverpool St				
London St				
Lucianna La				
Manning St	1916	H.T. Gillies	mayor,	Developed as part of the Palmerston Estate. Arthur Edward Manning
Market Place				
Marlborough Pl	1864	crown grant		renamed Hillsborough Place
Nisbet Street			Cr Charles Nisbet 1931-33 died 1937	renamed Arawa St 1930s
Ohaupo Road		crown grant	runs to Ohaupo	renamed Great South Road in 1937 Waipā CC
Palmerston Street	1864	crown grant	Henry John Temple (Lord) Palmerston	
Pembroke Street	1907	crown grant	13th Earl of Pembroke George Robert Charles Herbert 1850-1895 visited NZ in 1873	renamed Great South Rd, then Ohaupo Rd
Princes Street	1912-1913	Chocqueel		
Radnor Street	1905	crown grant		
Rostrevor St	1864	crown grant		renamed Rosstrevor
Thackeray Street	1864	crown grant	William Makepeace Thackeray	
Tidd Street	1923	Mrs W.A Graham	Cr J.E. Tidd?	
Tisdall Street	1864	crown grant		
Tisdall Terr				
Tristram St	1907	crown grant	Cr H.E. Tristram	renamed Hinemoa St 1965 by HCC
Vialou Street	1919	HCC	mayor	Isaac Richardson Vialou
Victoria Street	1864	crown grant	royalty Queen Victoria	In 1913 Jersey St (N), Tisdall St (S) and Victoria St linked as Victoria St. Bridge St to Hillsborough Terr remains Tisdall St. 1950s Victoria St extended to part of The Great South Rd - now Te Rapa Rd. To encourage CBD car traffic engineer J.B. Baird & Mayor Denis Rogers had the railway undergrounded. 1959–1964. South of Hood St lowered April 1915.
Ward Lane				
Ward Street	1906	crown endowment and railway land	Sir Joseph Ward'	
Wellington Street	1864	crown grant	Duke of Wellington, Arthur Wellesley	
Worley Place	1940	HCC	Borough engineer R.W. Worley	When Alexandra St underground carpark was built in 1986 Alexandra St from Ward St to car park Worley Pl replaced W Rd

== Hamilton East ==
Street name	Year	Named by owner	Named after	Other notes
Albert Street	1895		royal Prince of Wales, Albert Edward	
Argyle Street			Duke of Argyle	
Armagh Street				
Ashgrove Ct	2000	Grasshopper East Ltd	Sherwood Forest theme	and Chedworth Properties Ltd
Bains Avenue	1909	W.R. Bains	eponymous	
Beale Street	1892	crown grant	mayor	Bernard Charles Beale
Beaumont St	1964	Roach brothers		
Bell Street	1923	Alexander & James Bell	Cr Alexander Bell 1907-1909	Mrs A. Bell donated Grantham St site for art museum
Bledisloe Terr	1939	Housing Corp. & HCC	Governor General, Viscount Bledisloe	
Bond Street		Mrs Ada Warr	mayor James Shiner Bond	renamed Nixon Street, by owner
Brompton Crt				
Brookfield St	1977	crown grant Housing Cp	Auckland Barrister,	Frederick Morris Preston Brookfield
Brown Street	1924	HCC	Colonel Thomas Gore Brown?	
Cameron Road	1864	crown grant	Duncan Alexander Cameron	named by HBC early 1900s
Cassidy Street	1958	Housing Corporation	A.B. Cassidy, an old local identity	
Chancery Cl				
Chiefs Court				
Clyde Street	1864	crown grant	Baron Clyde of Clydesdale	
Coates Street	1907	Isaac Coates	eponymous?	completed 1908-09
Cobham Drive	1963	HCC S end, owned by Joe Hooper	Governor-General, Viscount Cobham	Renamed Southern Outlet. Included Hoopers Rd at S end
Colonial Lane	1979	Housing Corp. & HCC		
Cook Street	1894	crown grant	Captain James Cook	
Cotter Place	1953	N. Dey		
Cumbria Way	2000	Chedworth Properties Ltd		
Dawson Street	1895	crown grant	mayor Thomas Dawson	became a legal street in 1913
Denver Place	1964	Roach Brothers		
Dey Street	1894	crown grant	mayor William Dey	became a legal street in 1913
Dillon Place				
Earlswood Ave				
Emmadale La				
Fergusson St	1939	Housing Corp. & HCC	governors, Sir James Fergusson	
Finchley Place	2000	Grasshopper East Ltd		and Chedworth Properties Ltd
Findlay Street		Waikato Hospital Board	F. Findlay MP	renamed Brown St officially in 1931
Firth Street	1879	F.W. Lang	Josiah Clifton Firth	Whyte Street renamed in 1895
Ford Street	1959	J.R. Reid		
Fox Lane	1949	crown grant	named after Fox St	
Fox Street	1900-20	crown grant	William Fox	
Frances Street	1911	J. Madill	Frances Richard Claude?	owned 654 acres
Freyberg Street	1939	Housing Corporation	Governor-General	Sir Bernard Cyril Freyberg
Gadsby Place	1965	Peerless Enterprises	named after a former partner	
Galloway Street	1895	crown grant HBC 800 acres and a town	Thomas James Galloway	allotment beside Hamilton Hotel. He never lived in Hamilton.
Galway Avenue	1939	Housing Corp. & HCC	Governor-generals,	Sir George Monckton-Arundell, 8th Viscount Galway
Graham Street	1913	crown grant	William Australia Graham	renamed Maori Street in 1920s
Grey Street	1895	crown grant originally the S end of Main St	governor, George Grey	the rest was Heaphy Terr. In 1910 both became Grey St
Henry Street	1912	J. Riddell and D. Henry	eponymous?	
Hogan Street	1965	C&R Investments Ltd	golfers or golf courses, Ben Hogan	
Hungerford Cr	1928	Hamilton Domain Board	Hungerford Roche, land	grant for serving in the 4th Waikato Militia? Hamilton Gardens
Inverness Ave	1960	Matthew Henry	theme of castles in Scotland?	
James Street	1916	W.B. James	eponymous	
Jebson Place	1959	Housing Corp. & HCC	Director of Housing, J.V. Jebson	
Jellicoe Drive	1939	Housing Corp. & HCC	Governor-General	Earl John Rushworth Jellicoe
Joshua Lane				
June Place	1966	B.W. Kemp and A.E. George	month - off May St	
Kelvin Place	1957	V.M. Waugh and L.R. Hyde	L.R. Hyde's son	
Kennedy Lane				
Kingroyal Lane				
Kingsford Mws				
Littler Place	1965	C&R Investments Ltd	golfers and golf courses, Gene Littler	C&R was owned by the Casey and Roach brothers.
Locksley Lane				
MacFarlane St	1864	crown grant	James B Macfarlane	Auckland merchant
Masons Ave	1922	Tim and Rose Mason	eponymous	
Melrose Place				
Memorial Drive	1879	crown grant	WWI Hamiltonians - army planted trees	Renamed River Rd from Memorial Park to Bridge St in 1920 HCC
Myrtle Street	1911	J.W. Hardley	Myrtle Hardley	
Natland Street				
Naylor Street	1906	crown grant	William Naylor (Wiremu Neera)	
Nelson Street	1913	crown grant	Horatio Nelson?	
New Street	1906	H. Hardley		
Newall Street	1945	HCC	Governor-General, Cyril Newall	
Nixon Street	1910	crown grant	Marmaduke George Nixon	
Nobleman Pl	2001	Sherwoodvale I	Sherwood Forest theme	
Nottingham Dr	2000	Chedworth Properties/	Sherwood Forest theme	Grasshopper East End Ltd
Old Farm Road	1920	crown grant	originally used as an old farm road	
Onslow Street	1939	Housing Corp. & HCC	governors Rt Hon Earl of Onslow	
Opoia Road	1909	Doctor Andrew Seymour Brewis	Pa where railway and River Rd meet	Opoia means "The Gift"
Page Place	1974	Braithwaite/Page	Cr Ron Page, accountant	
Palmer Street	1906	Harry Lewis Hardly	Hamilton City engineer, J.T. Palmer	
Patricia Place	1961	Housing Corp. & HCC	a previous owner's daughter,	Patricia Holden
Pinfold Avenue	1950	Housing Corp. & HCC	mayor	Francis Dewsbury Pinfold
Plunkett Terr	1864	crown grant	Governor-General William Lee Plunkett	renamed Whitaker St 1939 by Housing Corp. & HCC
Riro Street	1909	Doctor Andrew Seymour Brewis	daughter, Annie Riro Margarita Brewis	(1894-1953)
River Road	1879	crown grant	next to the river	renamed Mill St 1913 by HBC special order
Robert Grigg P	1964	Housing Corp. & HCC	Robert Grigg sold the land to HC	
Rochford Court	2000	Grasshopper East Ltd & Chedworth Properties Ltd		
Rothbrook St	1955	Rothwell and Brook	owners names combined	
Scott Avenue	1958	E. Scott	eponymous	
Sillary Street	1900	crown grant	Colonel Charles Sillary?	an Auckland militia officer (1863)
Snead Place	1961	C&R Investments Ltd	golfers and golf courses, Sam Snead	
St Johns Avenue	2000	Chedworth Properties/	Sherwood Forest theme	Grasshopper East End Ltd
St Olpherts	1911	Robert F. Dandes	St Olphert	
St Winifreds Ave	1911	Mrs Winifred Watts	eponymous?	
Te Aroha Street	1879	crown grant	Mt Te Aroha	
Te Kaarearea Ave				
Thistlewood Ave	2000	Chedworth Properties/	Sherwood Forest theme	Grasshopper East End Ltd
Von Tempsky St	1969		Gustavus von Tempsky	
Warr Street	1916	Ada Warr	eponymous	
Watts Crescent	1946	Housing Corp. & HCC	mayor Percy Harold Watts	
Whyte Street	1909	Mary Jane Hardley	mayor? John Blair Whyte	
Willscarlet La			Sherwood Forest theme	
Wilson Street	1923	Lovegrove and Waters	Eben Wilson, Hamilton High School?	
Wiremu Street	1958		Wiremu Tamehana?	
Woodgreen Wy				
York Street	1963	F.J. Callaghan	castle	

== Hamilton Lake ==
Street name	Year	Named by owner	Named after	Other notes
Alison Street	1948	Crown Land Grant HCC	daughter of G.W. Gower who fought in mid-east war	
Camellia Place	1969	A.H. Pemberton	tree	
Gilbass Avenue	1973	Lake Park Ltd	Gillies and Bassett, Hamilton lawyers	
Hague Road				
Hastings Place				
Hibiscus Ave	1969	A.H. Pemberton	plants?	
Hill Street	1872	crown grant	steep hill	
Horne Street		W.A. Graham	J. Thornton Horne moved in 1876 and owned a bakehouse/	confectionary. Renamed Richmond Ave in 1923 by Mrs W.A. Graham
Hunter Street	1918	Mrs W.J. Hunter	husband, W.J. Hunter	renamed Waratah St, connection to Clarence St
Kowhai Street	1969	A.H. Pemberton	tree?	
Lake Crescent	1920-28	Bessie Graham Holden		
Lake Domain	1931	HCC	runs through Lake Rotoroa domain	
Park Terrace	1923	Mrs W.A. Graham	Lake Reserve Park nearby	
Quail Place				
Rimmington Dr				
Rotoroa Drive				
Ruakiwi Road	1913		used to be a part of Hill St. It runs from	Pembroke St, W of Domain edge. becomes Lake Rd at Hill St
Sandleigh Rd	1964	K.R. Smith	family home Sandleigh Rd, Leigh-on-Sea	
Selwyn Street	1923	Dr Selwyn Graham	eponymous	Waikato Hospital superintendent
Valley Terrace	1923	W.A. Graham	near Park Terrace?	
Quentin Drive	1977	HCC	a previous owner, Quentin Dudley Fraser	

== Harrowfield ==
Street name	Year	Named by owner	Named after	Other notes
Charles Henry Place				
Crowden Place				
Harrowfield Dr				
Landell Place				
Longwood Pl				
Mistry Place				
Radford Place				
The Avenue				

== Hillcrest ==
Street name	Year	Named by owner	Named after	Other notes
Aurora Terrace	1962	G.J. Carrington	stud horse	
Baffles Cres	1963	G.J. Carrington	stallion	
Beech Crescent	1961	Paramount Land	tree	Development Co
Bleakley Place	1961	St John's catholic order	Father M. Bleakley,	St Mary's priest
Brennan Place	1962	G.E. O'Donoghue		
Bretton Terrace	1950	J.P. Flynn and R.A. Forster		Renamed Bretton Orchard
Brocas Avenue	1954	E. & S.M. Brocas	eponymous	
Cambridge Rd	1904	named by T.B Insoll of	Waikato CC	
Cedar Place	1961	Paramount Land	tree	
Clark Place	1955	H.G. Webb	wife of M. Clark, developer	She was the sister of Corbett Holden
Corbett Avenue	1953	C. Corbett	eponymous	
Cotebrooke La				
Defoe Avenue	1960	G.J. Carrington	stallion	
Dorothy Place	1972	McKirk Properties		
Earls Court				
Edinburgh Rd	1959	Roach family	golfers and golf courses	
Fenwick Cres	1961	H.G. Webb & R.D. Duncan,		Hillcrest Properties
Flynn Road	1940	J.P. Flynn and R.A. Forster	Flynn family had an orchard	
Forster Avenue	1950	Robert Forster	eponymous	
Garthwood Rd	1961	Hogarth and Littlewood	owners names combined	
Gordon Street	1955	N. Mullane		
Greensboro St	1965	C&R Investments Ltd	golf course	
Helena Road	1961	Lugton Lands	island of St Helena	
Hillcrest Road	1904	crown grant	Waikato CC after the suburb	
Johnsview Terr	1957	A.J. Bustard	son, John	
Kakanui Ave	1938	R. English	the topography?	Kaka = ridge, hill; Nui = many, large
Kawakawa Pl				
Knighton Road	1930/1947	HCC		
Liston Crescent	1961	Lugton Lands &	Bishop James Liston	St Johns Roman Catholic Order
Lorimer Lane				
Masters Avenue	1943	Ernest Melbourne Masters	eponymous	
McCracken Ave	1960	PB & NJ Shaw,	A.E. McCracken, General	Manager of Ellis & Bernand Ltd
McGregor Place	1962	K.B. McKenzie	Scottish theme, it sounds Scottish	
Milburn Lane				
Mullane Street	1955	N. Mullane	eponymous	
O'Donoghue St	1962	G.E. O'Donoghue	eponymous	
Oku Close				
Orelio Street	1960-2	G.J. Carrington	stud horse	
Panair Crescent	1960	G.J. Carrington	stallion	
Piccadilly Lane				
Prescott Place	1955	T.P. Baron	owner's family	
Riverlea Road	1910-1920	militia land James McPherson	Riverlea House built in 1875	commander 4th Waikato Militia. Came into Hamilton in 1961/62.
Scotland Place	1962	D. Sommerville	owner's homeland	
Silverdale Road	1943/1962	HCC	Silverdale Farms, owned by Captain C.A. Davis.	renamed Knighton Ave 1962
Somme Crescent	1957	LBJ and D. Hintz	WW1 Battle of the Somme	
Sutton Crescent	1957	C.S. Sutton	eponymous	
Tarbett Road	1937	S. Tarbett Clements	eponymous	
Tralee Place	1958	D.B. Flynn		
Vectis Road	1950	R.W. Forster	a business he owned Vectis Dairy, Victoria St	
Vesty Avenue	1960	G.J. Carrington	Vesty Thomas, a friend of his father	
Vine Street	1954	S. Martelletti		
Vista Terrace	1961	Hogarth and Littlewood		

== Huntington ==
Street name	Year	Named by owner	Named after	Other notes
Alford Place				
Ashington Gr				
Ashmore Court				
Ashton Way				
Ashwick Terr				
Aspen Court				
Azure Place	2002	Huntington Park	colour	
Badminton Ct				
Ballantrae Pl				
Barrington Dr				
Barwick Place				
Bayswater Ct	2001	Chedworth/Grasshopper Joint Venture		
Belgrave Court	2001	Chedworth/Grasshopper Joint Venture		
Bishopsworth Way				
Borman Road			previous owner of Borman Farm, Mary Elizabeth Grey Borman	
Bowery Lane				
Braedan Lane				
Briar Rose Crt				
Buchanan Pl	2002	Somerset Heights Joint Venture	classical English names	
Camberley Way				
Castlewold Pl				
Chalgrove Rd				
Christobel Ccle				
Cleeve Close				
Cole Thomas Pl				
Compton Grove				
Connor Court				
Cotswold Lane				
Cranmore Ave	2002	Somerset Heights Joint Venture	English village	
Darjon Drive				
Eastridge Terr				
Eddlewood Ct				
Farleigh Close				
Fasham Lane				
Forge Street				
Gibbston Close				
Gordon Davies La				
Gordonton Rd				
Gracefield Pl	2001	Chedworth/Grasshopper Joint Venture		
Grasmere Court	2001	Chedworth/Grasshopper Joint Venture		
Hartford Terr				
Haswell Place				
Hatfield Way				
Hawkridge Rise				
Heathfield Ave				
Helmsdale Crt				
Henley Court	2002	Somerset Heights Joint Venture	English places	
Holcroft Place				
Holford Place	2002	Somerset Heights Joint Venture	English places	
Huntington Dr				
Jaemont Court	2002	Huntington Park		
Jarvis Court				
Jaspers Way				
Julie Court				
Keswick Cres				
Kingfisher Place				
Kinnaird Place				
Knapdale Mews				
Landmark Ct				
Langdale Court				
Lavender Way				
Limerick Lane				
Margrain Close				
Meadowbank Ct				
Merlin Close				
Millie Place				
Montrose Crescent				
New Borman Rd				
Newbury Place				
Oldfield Court				
Oolong Court				
Palliser Drive				
Park Road				
Parkside Drive				
Parkwood Place		Chedworth/Grasshopper Joint Venture		
Peninsula Point				
Pippa Lane				
Plover Court				
Porima Way				
Portobello Way		Chedworth/Grasshopper Joint Venture		
Raddington Way				
Raungawari Dr	1999	Tainui Development Ltd	Te Puea Hērangi's farm at Mercer	
Ravenscourt Pl		Chedworth/Grasshopper Joint Venture		
Rembrandt Terr		Chedworth/Grasshopper Joint Venture		
Rene Way				
Rhys Avenue				
Rose Lane				
Rosewood Court				
Sexton Road				
Shalimar Place				
Shaun Lane				
Shirley Place				
Shrule Place				
Somerton Drive	2002	Somerset Heights Joint Venture	English theme	
Springside Crt				
St James Drive		Chedworth/Grasshopper Joint Venture	St James's Park?	
Stanton Place				
Stratford Place		Chedworth/Grasshopper Joint Venture		
Takapu Place	1999	Tainui Development Ltd	Takapu Ruha Ruha, a burial site next to Maurea Marae	
Tallentire Crescent				
Taunton Court	2002	Somerset Heights Joint Venture	English theme	
Te Ironui Place				
Te Manatu Drive				
Te Puroa Place	1999	Tainui Development Ltd	Korokī Mahuta's Ngāruawāhia farm	
Teafields Court				
Teatree Close				
Teaview Court				
The Esplanade	2002	Huntington Park	“keep in line" with the other streets in this development	
The Ford				
The Peninsula				
Trimmer Lane				
Tupe Lane				
Vermont Court	2002/1936	Huntington Park		
Waima Lane				
Westbury Mews	2002	Somerset Heights Joint Venture	English classical names	
Wiltshire Drive	/2012	Chedworth/Grasshopper Joint Venture		
Winslow Court				

== Maeroa ==
Street name	Year	Named by owner	Named after	Other notes
Bollard Street	1917	Home Builders Ltd	Raglan MP, R.F. Bollard	
Carey Street	1920	F.B. Jolly	Dr John Carey a pioneer	settler - lived at Forest Lake
Churchill Ave	1947	Housing Corp. & HCC	Winston Churchill	part of Orakau Street until 1943, when it was reformed and renamed
Darley Street	1918	NZ Home Builders Ltd		renamed Allen St 1939 by citizens, as there was another one
Denz Street	1947	Housing Corp. & HCC	Cr Jack Denz 1922–38,	1944-65
Goldsmith St	1911	F. Jolly	a previous owner,	Harry Goldsmith, 1900. The other half of the street was called Victoria Rd
Hinau Street	1913	J.F. Vercoe	native trees	
Lafferty Street	1913	J.F. Vercoe	Cr Charles Lafferty	
Maeroa Road	1913	J.F. Vercoe	suburb of Maeroa	
Mātai Street	1913	J.F. Vercoe	native trees	
Miro Street	1913	J.F. Vercoe	native trees?	
Murray Street	1918	New Zealand Home Builders		
Rata Street	1913	J.F. Vercoe	native trees	
Rimu Street	1913	J.F. Vercoe	native trees	In 1913 the road only ran from Maeroa Rd to Roach St
Roach Street	1913	Waikato Hospital Board		part of Dudley Street was renamed in 1926
Stokes Crescent	1947	Housing Corp. & HCC		
Windsor Road	1917	New Zealand Home Builders	Windsor Castle?	

== Melville ==
Street name	Year	Named by owner	Named after	Other notes
Amber Lane				
Beatty Street	1955	Housing Corp. & HCC	war hero, David Beatty, 1st Earl Beatty	
Bremridge Pl	1971	Deanwell Properties		
Catalina Drive				
Clow Place				
Collins Road	1938	Collins family	eponymous	
Corrin Crescent	1954-5	L.A.M. Fauverbier	son, Corrin Fauverbier	
Corsair Place				
Coventry Road	1974	A.G. Smith	industrial city	Muldoon St was considered but rejected as inappropriate
Crescent Court	1975	Craftmaster Homes Ltd		
Cricket Place	1967	Kingsway Land		
Dowding Street	1949	Housing Corp. & HCC		
Filmer Place	1968-9	Paramount Builders Ltd	Dr D.J. Filmer, Animal Research Division	acting director, Department of Agriculture
Gallagher Drive				
Gardenia Close	2001	Grasshopper Properties	garden plants	
Grevillea Place	2001	Grasshopper Properties	garden plants	
Guy Place	1968	Archie Mason,	owner's son	Pty Homes/Parkdale Development Co
Harvard Court				
Heather Place	1959	J.B. Vivian,	daughter, Heather	R.L.C. Lockhart & C.F. Brunskill
Jones Crescent	1955	E.G. Jones	eponymous	
Katherine Place	1971	Deanwell Properties	daughter of T. Peppers	
Kittyhawk Place				
Lancewood Ave	1969	Davies and Marshall, Paramount Builders	tree	
Langdon Lane			Charles (Martin) Langdon, a	real estate agent
Lilac Street	1971	Deanwell Properties	Lilac flower?	
Lorne Street	1955	Housing Corp. & HCC	war hero, Lorne Maclaine Campbell?	
Mahoe Street	1920s c	crown grant	tree	first street in Melville
Matthews Cres	1960	Kingsway Lands Ltd & Hyde Real Estate	Alan Matthews, Matthews	
Minifie Avenue	1960	Kingsway Lands Ltd & Hyde Real Estate	an employee	
Mount View Rd	1963	A.C. Smith	view of Pirongia Mountain	
Normandy Ave	1904c	Housing Corp. & HCC	war theme	renamed Western Lea Rd officially 1949
Odette Street	1959	Housing Corp. & HCC	war hero, Odette Hallowes	
Pollen Crescent	1957	A.J. Fisk	Fisk was a beekeeper hence pollen	Fisk was also the ex-president of the Hamilton Historical Society
Priscilla Place	1963	Kingsway Lands	daughter, Priscilla Matthews	
Prisk Street	1963	A.C. Smith	previous owner, Ben Prisk	
Purcell Place				
Richardson Road	1958	H.E. Corbett	previous owner, Ron Richardson	
Silkwood Lane				
Stewart Place	1961	A.J. Thompson, D.M. Thompson and N.G. Stewart	eponymous	
Sundown Crescent	1963	Kingsway Homes Ltd		
Tawa Street	1913	J.F. Vercoe	native trees	
Thorburn Court				
Thornton Place	1963	A.C. Smith	Thornton J. Palmer HCC engineer	
Unity Lane				
Urlich Avenue	1956	K.U. and L.U. Tomin & E.A. Lambert	relative, Clem Urlich	
Vivian Street	1967	Housing Corp. & HCC	a previous owner, J.B. Vivian	
Windleborn Lane				
Yvonne Street	1965	Kingsway Lands Ltd	Yvonne an employee	

== Nawton ==
Street name	Year	Named by owner	Named after	Other notes
Aileen Place				
Aintree Street				
Aldershot Pl	1997	Thornton Estates Ltd	English places	
Antrim Place	1998	Totara Homes		
Arkle Place	1972-3	Emily, Bruce Arkle & H.J. Holmes	eponymous?	
Arundel Place	1997	Thornton Estates Ltd	English places	
Atlantic Street	1973	C.F.B. Coker, Housing Corpn		
Avalon Drive	1919c	In the early 1960s, a Mr Watson offered £1 prize to rename Norton Road Extension	The winning name was suggested by a visiting Auckland woman	The arterial road was originally named Norton Rd Extension to Rotokauri Rd. Avalon was shown on a map dated August 1963
Bartholomew D				
Baverstock Rd				
Beatrice Place				
Ben Lomond Pl				
Ben Nevis Pl				
Bishops Lane	1978	Housing Corp. & HCC	Catholic Bishop of Auckland registered owner	
Blomfield St	1976	Elliott Lands Ltd & Lugton Lands	Plunket Society president Dorothy Constance Blomfield	
Bradley Place	1976	Elliott Lands Ltd & Lugton Lands	a previous owner	
Breckons Ave	1914	E. Breckon	eponymous	
Brightwell Pl				
Bruton Place				
Carew Street	01/04/76	Bruce Lugton, Lugton Lands		
Caulfield Green				
Caulfield Place				
Clancy Place	1976	Pat Clancy, Paramount Builders Ltd	eponymous	
Crawshaw Dr				
David Street	1969	Elliott Lands Ltd	David Lugton, son of Bruce Lugton	
David Street				
Derby Street				
Dominion Road	1914	J. Thornes		
Dorchester Pl	1997	Thornton Estates Ltd	English places	
Durham Street	1973	Holmes Estates	theme of British castles	
Enfield Street	1974	Paramount Builders		
Flemington Pl				
Gilchrist Street				
Glenburn Place				
Glencoe Place				
Glenorchy Pl				
Grandview Rd	1912	crown grant HCC		
Grange Avenue	1974	Alf Steele, Peerless Homes Ltd	out of a book	
Hadrians Way	1997	Thornton Estates Ltd	English places	
Hamblyn Cres	1964	Bruce Lugton of Lugton Land	Kim Hamblyn, Auckland friend	& Elliot Lands Ltd
Highbury Place	1997	Thornton Estates Ltd	English places	
Hollinger Pl				
Holmes Street	1972	Bruce Lugton & Holmes family	eponymous	
Hyde Avenue	1974	Elliott Lands Ltd & Lugton Lands	associate, Lindsay Hyde	
Inveraray Pl				
Jack Rise				
Johannes Ct	1978	HCC	the owner, Johannes Overwater	
Karaka Street	1913	A Newby and Holmes	tree	renamed Tawa St 1951 Waipā CC special order
Kentucky Cres				
Kim Lane				
Kourataki Rd				
Leyton Place	1972	O.C. & M.M. Elliott	Leyton Elliott, of Elliott Lands	
Lindsay Cres	1974	Elliott Lands Ltd	associate, Lindsay Hyde	
Livingstone Av	1916	J. Livingstone	eponymous	
Lloyd Drive				
Lochinver Dr				
Lugton Street	1968	Hamilton Industrial Estates,	Bruce Lugton director	
Lynbrae Court				
Magnolia Cres	1974	A.N. Ferguson		
Manawaroa Cl				
McKinley Pl	1978	R.B. & J.G. Lugton & J.S. Hutchison	a previous owner	
Melfort Place				
Metro Avenue				
Millar Place	1974	Bruce Lugton	General Manager of	Bartholomew Timber Co. Also Elliott Lands Ltd
Mooney Street	1968	Bruce Lugton	a Lugton Lands secretary nicknamed Mooney	and Hamilton Industrial Este
Myrlene Place				
Norman Street	1956-60/ 1975	W.H. Pinn Ltd	Norman J. Holden	
Northview La	1975	A.N. Ferguson and I.W. Walker	northerly view?	
Nyanza Street	1916	J. Livingstone		
Oak Avenue	1914	J. Thornes		
Odlin Crescent	1974	Prestige Homes Ltd		
Olive Place	1977	Lugton Land, Beerescourt Investments Ltd	wife of Lindsay Hyde	Worker Place was rejected by HCC
Olly Close				
Penney Green				
Pringle Place				
Prior Place	1974	Bruce Lugton of Lugton Lands	Cr Prior who was also the accountant for	Elliott Lands
Pukaki Place				
Puriri Street	1913	A Newby and Holmes	native trees	renamed Rata St 1951 Waipā CC special order
Rawene Street	1913	A Newby and Holmes	native trees	renamed Rimu St 1951 Waipā CC special order
Reuben Place				
Rochester Pl				
Rosehill Place				
Roy Street	1956	Norman Holden	a friend and associate Roy Kemp	
Sandhurst Pl	1997	Thornton Estates Ltd	English places	
Shannon Place				
Simon Place	1974	Simon Perry, Perclo Developments	eponymous	
Stable Lane				
Sunnyside Rd	1913	J. Thornes		
Tamar Place	1978	HCC	1918 owner, Tamar Amy Thomas	
Tekapo Road				
Thode Place	1970	Bruce Lugton, Elliott Lands	Kim Thode friend	
Twickenham Pl	1997	Thornton Estates Ltd	English places	
Velma Cres	1964	Elliott Lands Ltd	someone in Elliott family? Bruce Lugton could not recall why,	but probably after HCC rejected Lamond St
Vernall Street	1956	Lugton Lands	Roy Vernall associate	
Waimarie St	1916	J. Livingstone	waimarie = good fortune, lucky	
Wall Street	1913/1964	A.J. Thornes		renamed Park Ave 1964 by Mrs M.C. McKinley
Warwickson L				
Wembley Cl	1977	Thornton Estates Ltd	English places	
Wexford Rise				
Whinfell Lane	1999	E. Mills	where owner is from	Also his mother's middle name.
Wimbledon Cl	1997	Thornton Estates Ltd	English classical appearance, ageless with	English names

== Pukete ==
Street name	Year	Named by owner	Named after	Other notes
Ash Place	1976	Peerless Homes Ltd	nature theme, Ash tree	
Ashurst Avenue	1969	Taupo Totara Timber Co	tree, forest, nature	original owner's name O'Connell, hence the name, O'Connell block
Balmerino Cres				
Camden Place				
Challinor Street	1969	R. Challinor Clough,	eponymous	Builders Land Services
Chanan Place			parents of owner,	Chanan Singh and Kaur. Renamed Tariki Place by the owners
Cherrywood St	1977	Taupo Totara Timber Co	tree	
Chestnut Place	1977	Taupo Totara Timber Co	tree	
Church Road	1945-50		Cr Church, Waipā CC 1945	
Clematis Ave	1969-70	Builders Land Services Ltd	tree	
Cottage Lane				
Cullimore St	1974	Peerless Homes Ltd	Bert Cullimore field staff	chief for the Housing Corporation
Cypress Cres	1976	Peerless Homes Ltd	tree	
Eagle Way				
Elmwood Cres	1973	Taupo Totara Timber Co	tree	
Emma Place				
Frost Place	1974	Peerless Homes Ltd	purchased from Frost Trust	
Fuchsia Avenue	1971	Builders Land Services Ltd	tree	
Highland Drive	1974	Alf Steele, Peerless Homes Ltd		
Horoeka Court	1978	Paramount Builders Ltd	native trees	
Houhere Place	1971	Builders Land Services Ltd	native trees	
Jean Place				
Judena Place				
Kaimiro Street				
Kapuni Street			gas fields?	
Karewa Place	2002	Wairere Drive Ppties Ltd	Karewa Island, Bay of Plenty	
Kohekohe Pl	1971	Builders Land Services Ltd	tree	
Kupe Place	1999	Grasshopper Developments Ltd	gas fields	
Lickfold Lane				
Mānuka Street	1974	Builders Land Services Ltd	native trees	and Peerless Homes Ltd
Matipo Cres	1976	Brian Perry	native trees	
Maui Street	1999	Grasshopper Developments Ltd	gas fields	
McKee Street	1999	Grasshopper Developments Ltd	gas & oil field	
Meadow View La				
Millthorpe Cres				
Moreland Avenue				
Moverley Place				
Ngaio Place	1977	Builders Land Services Ltd	native trees	
Nikau Place	1975	D.T. Morrow & Builders Land Services	native trees	
Norfolk Place	1975	Peerless Homes Ltd	Norfolk Pine Tree	
O'Connell Court	1977	Housing Corp. & HCC	the owner, Mr O'Connell	
Oakfield Cres	1973	Taupo Totara Timber Co	tree	
Pohutukawa Dr	1971	Builders Land Services Ltd	native trees	
Pukete Road	1969-70c	Builders Land Services Ltd	old parish of Pukete	
River Oaks Place				
Ronald Court				
Sequoia Place				
Sherwood Drive	1969	Taupo Totara Timber Co	Sherwood Forest theme	
Sycamore Place	1977	Taupo Totara Timber Co	tree	
Taksan Place				
Tanekaha Place	1971	Builders Land Services Ltd	native trees	
Titoki Place	1973	Builders Land Services Ltd	native trees	
Totara Drive	1969	Taupo Totara Timber Co	native trees	
Tupelo Street				
Willowfield Pl	1977	Taupo Totara Timber Co	nearby willow field	

== Queenwood ==
Street name	Year	Named by owner	Named after	Other notes
Brookview Ct	1975	Apollo Building Association Soc Ltd	view of a brook	
Clements Cres	1965	K&CM MacDonald	Mrs K. MacDonald's	family, who owned land in Rototuna
Colman Street	1963	Mrs Constance Jary		renamed because of other Thomas Roads
Constance St	1951-8	Herbert Jary	a previous owner,	Mrs Constance Jary
Glen Lynne Ave	1965	K. & C.M Macdonald	Clement's family home	sold to Gerrand Homes Ltd
Laurence Street				
McDowall Place	1969	McDowall, Lynbrae Lands Ltd	eponymous	
McInnes Place	1965	K.M. McDonald	McDonald ancestral home	
Paulette Place	1964	Rossiter Investments Ltd		
Portree Place	1974	K. & C.M. McDonald	McDonald ancestral home	
Pulham Crescent	1965	Gerrard of Gerrard Homes, developer. K. & C.M. McDonald	employee of company	
Queenwood Ave	1956	Constance Jary	named after the area	renamed Constance Avenue 1969
Samuel Place	1965	Ken MacDonald	Samuel Clements	
Tauhara Drive	1965	Mr Ridant of Tauhara Properties Ltd	eponymous	

== Riverlea ==
Street name	Year	Named by owner	Named after	Other notes
Balfour Cres	1963	D.M. McKenzie	Balfour family, English	friends
Callard Place	1961	Edgar Bowden Callard	eponymous	he ran a photography shop
Chesterman Rd	1962	D.M. McKenzie	Waikato CC planner	Herbert Edward Chesterman
County Cres				
Geoffrey Place				
Howell Avenue	1962	D.M. McKenzie	Reginald George Howell,	Waikato CC engineer
Hudson Court				
Hudson Street	1968	D.M. McKenzie	WWII plane	
Louise Place	1973	D.M. McKenzie	granddaughter	
Malcolm Street	1973	D.M. McKenzie	son, Malcolm McKenzie	
Mexted Place				
Norma Place	1963	D.M. McKenzie	sister, Norma McKenzie	
Olympia Place	1963	D.M. McKenzie	went to Tokyo Olympics	
Sheriff Place	1973	D.M. McKenzie	horse	
Silva Crescent	1968	D.M. McKenzie	horse	

== Rotokauri ==
Street name	Year	Named by owner	Named after	Other notes
Brymer Road	1967	suggested by residents	Brymer a property owner	& Cr G.A.Lee. Renamed Hamilton Boundary Rd by special order of Waipā CC
Errol Close				
Exelby Road	1967		chosen by residents	renamed Newcastle Boundary Rd by special order of Waipā CC
Hapori Avenue				
Hapu Avenue				
Iwi Road				
Kawariki Drive				
Lee Road	1930-40	Lee family	eponymous	
Mana Drive				
Patatee Terrace				
Pukenga Avenue				
Rengarenga Close				
Rotokauri Road	1880s	Waipā CC	Lake Rotokauri is nearby	
Taiatea Drive				
Wairua Avenue				
Whakapono Ave				
Whanau Avenue				

== Rototuna ==
Street name	Year	Named by owner	Named after	Other notes
Abbie Lane				
Acton Vale	2002	Grosvenor Park Ltd	in line with Grosvenor Park names	
Alconbury Dr	1999	Grosvenor Park Ltd	English places	
Alderwick Place				
Allgood Place				
Apollo Place				
Aquila Crescent				
Arahi Place				
Arista Way				
Arlington Court	2002	Grosvenor Park Ltd	theme of Grosvenor Park	
Astelia Lane				
Aylesbury Court	1999	CDL Land NZ Ltd	English Theme	
Benjamin Ave				
Bircham Rise				
Blairgowrie Pl				
Bourn Brook Av				
Bramley Drive				
Bramley Mews				
Brunswick Pl	1999	Grosvenor Park Ltd	classical English names	
Buckingham Pl				
Burgundy Crt				
Burleigh Place				
Cabernet Close				
Cadman Court				
Cairns Cres	1998	Bramley Ltd	family name	
Callum Brae Dr				
Callum Court	2000	Bramley Ltd	Scottish names	
Capricorn Place				
Carisbrook Pl				
Cate Road	1916	W. Cate	eponymous	legalised in 1920 by HCC
Caversham Dr				
Chadwick Place				
Chapel Hill	1997	Hillcrest Chapel Trust	plans to build a chapel on the corner. Also A A Pattesen	
Chartwell Glen				
Chatham Place				
Chatswood Pl				
Cherie Close	2001	Callum Brae	theme of Scottish names	
Chesham Street				
Chesterfield Pl	1998	Grasshopper Properties	English places	
Coleraine Drive	2001	Rototuna Lands	owner is a wine connoisseur	
Cranbrook Pl	1999	Grosvenor Park Ltd	English places	
Cranmer Close	1999	CDL Land NZ Ltd	English theme.	
Dingwall Court	1998	Dingwall's, Bramley Ltd	eponymous,	
Drumfearn Pl	1998	Bramley Ltd	employee's name	
Dugald Court				
Ebony Court				
Edenpark Drive	1999	Eden Park Ltd	religious belief	
Faber Place				
Farnham Close	1999	Grosvenor Park Ltd	English places	
Farringdon Ave	1999	CDL Land NZ Ltd	English theme	
Fencourt Place				
Fendalton Drive				
Fergy Place				
Flora Way	1999	Flora family, owned Bramley Ltd	eponymous	
Foxbury Court				
Galahad Court				
Gavin Heights	2001	Callum Brae	Scottish names	
Gilbert Court		Bramley Ltd	an employee	
Glen Cree Ave				
Glengoyne Pl	2001	On-Line Developments,	Scottish names, Glengoyne Distillery	
Glenwarrick Ct		Bramley Ltd	Scottish sounding names	Callum Brae
Glyll Close	2012			28/1/2012 still in the planning stage
Grace Avenue	1999	Eden Park Ltd	religious belief	
Greenough Pl				
Greenwich Pl	1997	Grasshopper Properties	English places, Greenwich	
Grenache Place				
Gresham Place	1999	CDL Land NZ Ltd	English theme,	Gresham College
Grosvenor Pl				
Guildford Place	1998	Grasshopper Properties	English places, Guildford	
Haddonstone A				
Hampstead Wy	1999	Grosvenor Park Ltd	English places - well known	
Harwich Court	1998	Grasshopper Properties	English places, Harwich	
Hector Drive				
Hemsby Place				
Highgate				
Holly Place				
Iain Court	2000	Iain family,	eponymous	Callum Brae Development
Innswood Place	1999	CDL Land New Zealand Ltd	English places	
Jane Way				
Jennian Avenue				
Johnnybro Pl				
Johnsfield Pl	1998	Waipuna Developments	a previous owner, John Thompson	
Keerangi Place				
Kenneth Place				
Kilmuir Place	1999	Bramley Ltd	developer's family	
Kimbrae Drive				
Kingsbury Crt	2001	CDL Land NZ Ltd	English theme	
Kirk Close	2002	Bramley Ltd	church is adjacent	
Kowaro Street				
Lansbury Court	1999	CDL Land NZ Ltd	English theme. Lansbury Estate, or George Lansbury?	
Lavenham Pl	1999	Grosvenor Park Ltd	English places?	
Lockhart Place	2001	On-line Developments	used internet to find Scottish names	
Maanihi Drive				
Macarthur Mws				
MacCallum Ct	2001	On-Line Developments	used internet to find Scottish names	
Maidstone Pl	1998	Grasshopper Properties	English places	
Malbec Place				
McKenzie Place	2001	Tranz Group Ltd.-	Scottish theme	Saxon Woods Development
McLeod Mews				
Mercury Court				
Merivale Court				
Merlot Place	2001	Rototuna Lands	connoisseur of wine	
Micah Place				
Mickelson Ave				
Miers Glade	1999	CDL Land NZ Ltd	English places. Miers Glade was named because it sounds English	
Moonlight Drive				
Mosslea Court				
Nielsen Gardens	19971977	Tranz Group	a previous owner	
North City Road				
North Ridge Drive				
Northmeadow Dr	1999	Rototuna One Ltd	"meadow-like" feel	
Oakmont Place				
Paiaka Place				
Piwakawaka Court				
Platina Place				
Raupo Place				
Raupo Place				
Repoiti Court				
Reponui Court				
Resolution Drive				
Rewiti Lane				
Roderick Place	1999	Bromley Ltd	family name	
Rototuna Road	1907	Waikato CC	Lake Tunawhakapeka, Whakapeka or Rototuna.	renamed Rototuna School Rd on 10 November 1982
San Clemento Way				
San Marco Lane				
Sandowne Close				
Sarah Court				
Satchmo Place				
Savannah Place				
Saxon Woods Dr	2001	Saxon Woods Development	eponymous	
Shiraz Place				
Sovereign Isle Lane				
Sovereign Place	1999	Eden Park Ltd	religious belief	
Stanfield Court				
Strathconnan	1999	Bramley Ltd	family names	
Strathmore Drive	2001	On-Line Developments	Scottish names	
Sudbury Court	1999	Grosvenor Park Ltd	English places	
Swan Lane				
Tarrango Way				
The Palms				
Thomas Road	1900	Frederick William Thomas	eponymous	
Tiro Place				
Tokerau Drive				
Turakina Rise				
Turnbury Court				
Vereker Court				
Waikaka Place				
Waipuna Place	1996	Waipuna Developments Ltd	eponymous?	
Waireka Road				
Waitihi Way				
Wakefield Place				
Watford Place				
Welwyn Place				
Wentworth Drive	1999	CDL Land NZ Ltd	English theme	
Wessex Place				
Westminster Pl	2002		English classical appearance	
Whistler Close				
Whitford Place				
Whitney Place				
Wichford Place				
Winchester Place				
Windermere Rise	1996	Waipuna Developments		
Woburn Court				
Woodham Place	1999	CDL Land NZ Ltd	English theme	
Worcester Drive	1998	Grasshopper Properties	English classical appearance, ageless with English names	
Wychbury Court	1999	CDL Land NZ Ltd	English theme	
Wynona Way				

== Ruakura ==
Street name	Year	Named by owner	Named after	Other notes
Archer Court	2001	Sherwoodvale II	Sherwood Forest theme	
Bisley Road	1952	Cr A.M. Bisley	eponymous	
May Street	1965-66c	M.E. Brough	month of May?	
Ruakura Road		crown grant	farm on an 1879 Survey Map	Captain William Steele 4th Waikato Militia was given grant

== Saint Andrews ==
Street name	Year	Named by owner	Named after	Other notes
Arcus Street			Don Arcus, chairman and lawyer	
Ashley Street	1974	D.V. Bryant Trust Board	board member, Ashley Taylor	
Beadle Place				
Bowen Place	1970	Bartholomew Timbers	governor, George Ferguson Bowen	The original suggestion was Kelburn Pl
Braid Road	1926	Waiopehu Levin Land Co		
Brough Place	1972	D.T. Morrow,	Brough, one of Peerless Homes Ltd directors	
Bryant Road	1966	Housing Corp. & HCC	Daniel Vickery Bryant	
Burn-Murdoch St	1974	D.V. Bryant Trust Board	board member, Burn-Murdoch	
Cattanach St	1974	D.V. Bryant Trust Board	chair - Rev Duncan Cattanach Presbyterian minister	
Cecil Street	1966	D.V. Bryant Trust Board	trust member, Cecil D. Bryant	
Clarkson Close				
Cotton Street	1959	K.B. McKenzie		
Croall Crescent	1966	Housing Corp. & HCC	mayoral candidate Cr Charles Croall 1944 owned	Croall Construction Ltd. Died fishing at Raglan, aged 70
Dallinger Street	1974	D.V. Bryant Trust Board	Pat Dallinger, matron of Mary Bryant Nursery	
Delamare Road	1966	D.V. Bryant Trust Board	Frederick Archibald de la Mare, lawyer and trustee	Officially named in 1974
Dover Road	1956	R.E Littlejohn	Dover	
Duncan Road	1926	Waiopehu Levin Land	development by A.D. Murray	in 1962 when it got its legal name
Edwin Street	1968	D.V. Bryant Trust Board	Allen Edwin Bryant, a trustee	
English Street	1965	D.V. Bryant Trust Board	Board member, R.F. English	
Forsyth Street	1951	E.G. Meynett		renamed Tiri Avenue by the owner in 1971
Garland Drive				
Glading Place	1967	St Andrews Properties	golf, NZPGA champion, Bob Glading	Another name suggested for this street was Links View Place
Glasgow Street	1939	Housing Corp. & HCC	Governor-generals, Rt. Hon Earl of Glasgow	
Golf Grove	1966	Public Trustees and Davies	golf course adjacent	
Grassy Downs Pl	1978	D.V. Bryant Trust	C.D. Bryant's farm was Grassy Down	
Gudex Court	1966	Housing Corp. & HCC	Micheal Christian Gudex, botanist and teacher	
Hampton Place	1960	K.B. McKenzie	Colin Hampton built a house on the new street	
Heath Street	1913	Owen Brothers	eponymous	an Owen Brother was called Heath
Hilton Road	1913	Owen Brothers		
Hugh Place	1967	D.V. Bryant Trust Board	Dr Hugh Douglas, board member	
Jamieson Cres	1966	Housing Corp. & HCC	Macandrew Jamieson, kindergarten?	
Kingsley Street	1959-60	F.W. Danrell	his nephew, Kingsley Danrell	
Larnach Street	1966	D.V. Bryant Trust Board	trustee Campbell Larnach Macdiarmid	
Maahutaupeke Pl				
Madill Road	1952/1974	D.V. Bryant Trust Board	P. Madill, one of the original trustees	
Mangakoea Pl				
Marnane Terr	1965	D.V. Bryant Trust Board	trust board member, Jack Marnane	
Mears Road	1965	D.V. Bryant Trust Board	Ian Mears, involved with trust board	& solicitor Macdiarmid, Mears and Grey
Minchin Cres	1939	A. Minchin		residents since 1900. Developed to prevent government taking it
Morrow Avenue	1970	D.T. Morrow	eponymous	
Perclo Place	1969	C.S. Ryan,	eponymous	also Perclo Developments Ltd
Sandwich Road	1926	Waiopehu Levin Land Co Ltd	golf courses, personalities or towns?	Royal St George Golf Club, Sandwich
Seamer Place	1966	Housing Corp. & HCC	Arthur John Seamer, Māori Methodist Minister in Hamilton	
St Andrews Terr	1916	H.T. Gillies	St Andrews Church	
Taylor Terrace	1913	Waiopehu Levin Land Co		
Waiwherowhero Dr				
Warwick Avenue	1958	Housing Corp. & HCC	theme of British castles	
Wilfred Street	1968	D.V. Bryant Trust Board	D. Wilfred Arcus, chairman of the trust, starting in 1968	

== Silverdale ==
Street name	Year	Named by owner	Named after	Other notes
Ashbury Ave	1963	McLachlan, Chartwell Properties Ltd	suggestion of one of Chartwell Properties sales staff	
Barrie Crescent	1963-4	T.P. Baron, Silverdale	youngest son of Mrs L.H. Fraser, an original partner	
Berkley Avenue	1962	Hamilton Investment		
Beverley Cres	1962	Hamilton Investment Corporation	resident on street, Beverley Wooley.	Previous owners, the Mullaine family
Burwood Place	1963	McLachlan, Chartwell Properties Ltd	staff member's father migrated from Burwood.	
Carlson Cres	1963	McLachlan, Chartwell Properties Ltd	a previous owner, A.C. Carlson	
Carrington Ave	1960	G.J. Carrington	eponymous	
Chelmsford St	1963	Silverdale Farms Ltd	original partner's home of Lloyd H. Fraser	
Cranwell Place	1963	D.M. McKenzie	RAF Cranwell WWII Training	School he attended
Crosher Place	1975	Housing Corp. & HCC	a MoW landscape officer who developed a nursery and kept the remaining trees	
Dalesford St	1963-4	Silverdale Farms Ltd	Mrs LH Fraser's family home	
Eton Drive	1962	Hamilton Investment Cn	a previous owner, Mullaine family	
Gazeley Avenue	1963	G.J. Carrington	horse	
Leeds Street	1964	T.P. Baron, Silverdale Farms Ltd	Mrs T.P. Baron's birthplace	
Linthorpe Place	1963	D.M. McKenzie	WWII posting	
Lysander Place	1963	D.M. McKenzie	Lysander he had flown	
Mansel Avenue	1930	E. Mansel	eponymous?	
Morrinsville Rd		dedicated by Waikato CC	goes to Morrinsville	
Morris Road	1961	Paramount Industries Ltd		
Nevada Road	1963	T.P. Baron, Silverdale Farms Ltd	family home	
Pryce Place	1963	T.P. Baron, Silverdale Farms Ltd	an employee Roderick Pryce	
Regent Street	1963	McLachlan, Chartwell Properties Ltd	English name	A.C. Carlson early owner
Sheridan Street	1963	T.P. Baron, Silverdale Farms Ltd	Bruce Sheridan, a senior partner in an accounting firm	
Southsea Crescent	1963-4	T.P. Baron, Silverdale Farms Ltd	owner's birthplace	
Willow Road	1961	Paramount Land Development Co	willow trees that line the road?	
Yorkshire Road	1964	T.P. Baron, Silverdale Farms Ltd	wife Joan Baron's home county,	

== Te Rapa ==
Street name	Year	Named by owner	Named after	Other notes
Akoranga Road				
Ann Michele St	1956	A.O. Murray	daughter	
Arthur Porter D				
Barnett Place	1998	Udy Family Trust	industrial park manager, Bryce Barnett	
Brent Greig La				
Bristol Place	1966	Damarnic Development	English seaport. Peyton Place was the original suggestion	
Chalmers Road				
Clem Newby Rd				
Crawford Street	1968	NZR	L. G. Crawford; born 23 January 1917; draughtsman, resident engineer.	Was part of Sunshine Ave
Daniel Place	1974	D.V. Bryant Trust	Daniel Vickery Bryant	& Holman Construction
De Leeuw Place	2002	Workstore D'nts Ltd	Workstore Developments Ltd marketing manager De Leeuw	
Doriemus Drive				
Earthmover Crs				
Euclid Avenue	1959	Motor Enterprises Ltd	Euclid, Ohio	
Foreman Road	1967	Hamilton Industrial	a Hamilton Industrial Estates shareholder, Foreman family	
Formation Dr	1999	B. Pohatu	RNZAF base	
Gilbek Place				
Home Straight				
Hounsell Road				
Kahu Crescent				
Ken Browne Dr				
Maahanga Drive	2005c	replaced streets built 1948-50 as RNZAF married quarters	and named after WWII allied landings (Pacific Cres, Jacquinot St - Jacquinot Bay, Rendova St Rendova Island, Saigon St and Santos St)	In places they remain
Mahana Road	1951	E.G. Meynett		
Mainstreet Pl				
Manchester Pl				
Mark Porter Wy				
Maxwell Place	1999	Industrial Property Development Ltd	current owner	
Minogue Drive				
Norman Hayward Place	1998	Te Rapa Industrial Estate	developer's father-n-law	
Norris Avenue	1965	Motor Enterprises Ltd	H.M. Norris, a solicitor and historian	
Northpark Drive				
Northway Street	1970	Damarnic Development Co		
Old Ruffle Road		came into the county in 1977	this piece of the road was left after a new road to Te Rapa Rd.	Also still goes onto Te Rapa Rd
Parkinson Place		Parkinson family	eponymous	
Roger Kaui Place				
Ruffell Road	1910-1920			officially came into Waipā 1977
Sheffield Street	1966	Damarnic Development Co	Sheffield	HCC rejected Coronation St
Simsey Place	2002	Workstore Developments Ltd	their marketing agent	
Sir Tristram Ave	2001	Waikato Racing Club	race horse from Sir Patrick Hogan's Cambridge stable	
Sunshine Avenue	1913	J.W. Hopkins		
Tasman Road	1967	Hamilton Industrial Estates	Abel Tasman	Fullerton St was rejected by HCC
Te Kowhai Road				
Te Rapa Road	early 1900s		Suburb, Māori chief, marae?	renamed from Great South Rd in the 1950s by HCC
Te Wetini Drive				
The Base Parade	1999	B. Pohatu	main entrance to Northgate	renamed Northgate Blvd
The Boulevard				
Udy Place	1998	Te Rapa Industrial Estate	owner of company	
Vickery Street	1963	D.V. Bryant Trust Board	Daniel Vickery Bryant	
Waterview Drive				

== Temple View ==
Street name	Year	Named by owner	Named after	Other notes
Beehive Lane		LDS Church	Symbol from Mormon ideology	
Boyack Drive		LDS Church	Dr Clifton D Boyack, first headmaster of Church Collage	
Cowley Drive		LDS Church	Matthew Cowley, Mormon missionary	
Deseret Road		LDS Church	Word for "honeybee" in the Book of Mormon	
Foster Road			TE Foster, farmer	
Goodwin Terrace				
Kaakano Lane	2021	LDS Church	"Seed" in the Māori language	
Market Street				
Matua Street		LDS Church	"Chief" in the Māori language	
Maynard Place		LDS Church	Milton Maynard, Mormon missionary	
McKay Drive		LDS Church	David O. McKay, LDS Church president	
Temepara Drive	2021	LDS Church	"Temple" in the Māori language	
Timatanga Road	2021	LDS Church	"Beginning" in the Māori language	
Tuhikaramea Road	1886/2012		Renamed from Frankton-Pirongia Road in 1910 by Waipā County Council after WS Higgin's farm, Tuhikaramea	
Tupuna Drive		LDS Church	"Ancestor" in the Māori language	
Wade Lane		LDS Church	Alton L. Wade, former principal of Church College	
Whakatipu Street		LDS Church	"Growth" in the Māori language	
Wiser Place				
Wood Road				

== Western Heights ==
Street name	Year	Named by owner	Named after	Other notes
Country Lane				
Ellicott Road	1916			renamed Forest Lake Extension by 1947
Greenfield Dr				
Jefferson Hts	1998	Clearwood Developments Ltd	previous owner,	Jefferson family, on hill
Newcastle Road	1958	crown grant	theme of castles	renamed Boundary Rd officially by Waipā CC in 1958
Palm Grove Dr	1997	Clearwood Developments Ltd		
Pampas Place				
Parkview Avenue				
Prospect Place				
Silhouette Way				
Strata View				
Sunny Dale				
Sunset Close				
Tironui Terrace				
West Ridge Dr				
Western Hts Dr				
Westview Place	1998	Clearwood Developments Ltd	westward facing	

== Whitiora ==
Street name	Year	Named by owner	Named after	Other notes
Abbotsford St	1864	crown grant		
Charlemont St	1864	crown grant	Irish statesman?	James Caulfeild, 1st Earl of Charlemont
Dillicar Street	1940	HCC	Cr W.W. Dillicar 1931-45	
Dinan Lane				
Dyer Street	1913	crown grant	mayor Robert William Dyer?	
Edgecumbe St	1913	crown grant	mayor George Edgecumbe	renamed Lower Mount Street in 1923 by HCC
Gwynne Place	1913	crown grant HCC	Mrs Gwynne owned a hotel	and Cr R.J. Gwynne 1893-99
Hardley Street	1911	Hardley family were early settlers	eponymous	built houses on the street in 1900
Mill Lane	1977	HCC	parallel to Mill Street	
Mill Street	1907-8			renamed New St in 1929 by HCC. New St remained in Claudelands
Old Mill Street				
Richmond Street				originally Cook St, was also former name of Bridge St
Seddon Road	1911	F. Jolly	Richard Seddon	
Stadium Lane				
Teddy Street	1940-5c		Cr E.J. "Teddy" Watkins	
Ulster Street	1864	crown grant	Ulster province in Ireland?	
Willoughby St	1864	crown grant	Willoughby Shortland	
