= Erwin Leonard Guy Abel =

New Zealand businessman, athlete, and racehorse owner

Erwin Leonard Guy Abel (23 October 1911 – 1 May 1995) was a New Zealand grocer, businessman, athlete and racehorse owner. He was born in Ohakune, Ruapehu District, New Zealand on 23 October 1911. Abel opened New Zealand's first shopping mall, The Big A Plaza, at Glenview, Hamilton in October 1969.
