= Glenview, New Zealand =

Suburb of Hamilton, New Zealand

Glenview
- Suburb
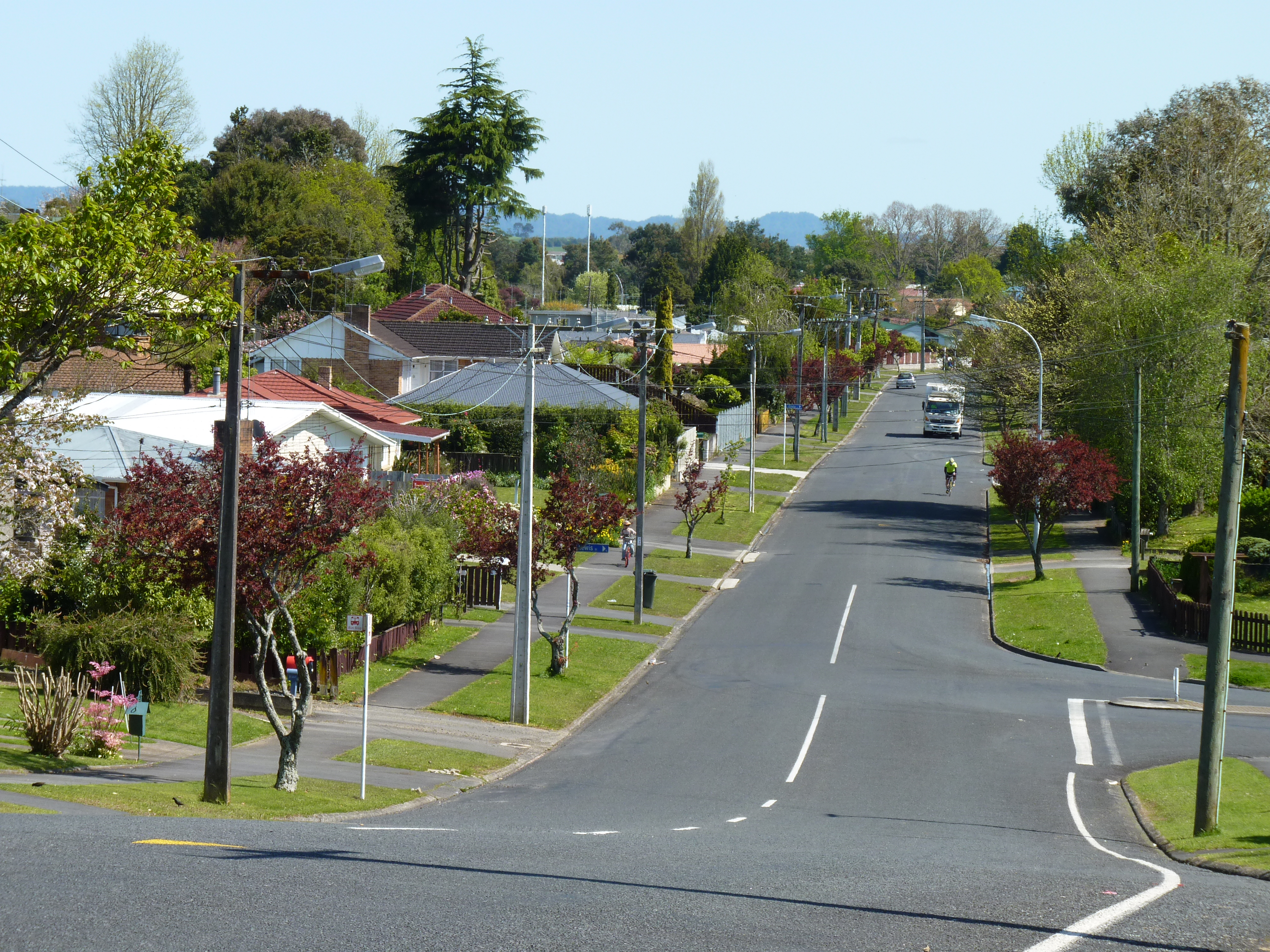
- A neighbourhood in Glenview, Hamilton.
- Interactive map of Glenview
- Coordinates: 37°49′18.92″S 175°17′12.71″E
- Country: New Zealand
- City: Hamilton, New Zealand
- Local authority: Hamilton City Council
- Electoral ward: West Ward
- Established: 1963

Area
  - Land: 202 ha (500 acres)

Population (June 2025)
  - Total: 5,430
  - Density: 2,690/km^{2} (6,960/sq mi)

Melville	Bader
Deanwell	Glenview	Fitzroy
		Rukuhia

Glenview is a suburb in southern Hamilton in New Zealand. It was named by Bruce Lugton of developers Lugton Lands. He chose Glenview because he felt it depicted the area perfectly. It was defined as a suburb in 1963.

Glenview was the site of New Zealand's first shopping mall in 1969, grocer Erwin Leonard Guy Abel's Big A Plaza. Today Glenview has a small shopping centre and Resthills Park.

== Demographics ==
Glenview covers 2.02 km^{2} (0.78 sq mi) and had an estimated population of 5,430 as of June 2025, with a population density of 2,688 people per km^{2}.

Historical population
Year	Pop.	±% p.a.
2006	4,071	—
2013	4,179	+0.37%
2018	4,722	+2.47%
2023	4,881	+0.66%

Glenview had a population of 4,881 in the 2023 New Zealand census, an increase of 159 people (3.4%) since the 2018 census, and an increase of 702 people (16.8%) since the 2013 census. There were 2,400 males, 2,457 females and 21 people of other genders in 1,728 dwellings. 3.0% of people identified as LGBTIQ+. The median age was 33.6 years (compared with 38.1 years nationally). There were 1,029 people (21.1%) aged under 15 years, 1,095 (22.4%) aged 15 to 29, 2,118 (43.4%) aged 30 to 64, and 642 (13.2%) aged 65 or older.

People could identify as more than one ethnicity. The results were 62.3% European (Pākehā); 24.8% Māori; 5.2% Pasifika; 23.2% Asian; 2.1% Middle Eastern, Latin American and African New Zealanders (MELAA); and 2.9% other, which includes people giving their ethnicity as "New Zealander". English was spoken by 94.8%, Māori language by 6.5%, Samoan by 0.4%, and other languages by 17.9%. No language could be spoken by 3.1% (e.g. too young to talk). New Zealand Sign Language was known by 0.6%. The percentage of people born overseas was 29.0, compared with 28.8% nationally.

Religious affiliations were 34.0% Christian, 4.9% Hindu, 2.0% Islam, 1.1% Māori religious beliefs, 1.2% Buddhist, 0.5% New Age, 0.1% Jewish, and 2.7% other religions. People who answered that they had no religion were 47.8%, and 6.0% of people did not answer the census question.

Of those at least 15 years old, 1,029 (26.7%) people had a bachelor's or higher degree, 2,010 (52.2%) had a post-high school certificate or diploma, and 819 (21.3%) people exclusively held high school qualifications. The median income was $44,600, compared with $41,500 nationally. 297 people (7.7%) earned over $100,000 compared to 12.1% nationally. The employment status of those at least 15 was that 2,088 (54.2%) people were employed full-time, 453 (11.8%) were part-time, and 126 (3.3%) were unemployed.

Individual statistical areas
Name	Area (km^{2})	Population	Density (per km^{2})	Dwellings	Median age	Median income
Glenview	0.89	2,442	2,744	852	31.4 years	$44,700
Resthill	1.12	2,439	2,178	876	36.1 years	$44,500
New Zealand					38.1 years	$41,500

== Education ==
Glenview School is a coeducational contributing primary school for years 1 to 6 with a roll of 414 as of July 2026. The school opened in 1964.

== See also ==
- List of streets in Hamilton
- Suburbs of Hamilton, New Zealand
