= Fitzroy, Hamilton =

Suburb of Hamilton, New Zealand

Fitzroy
- Suburb
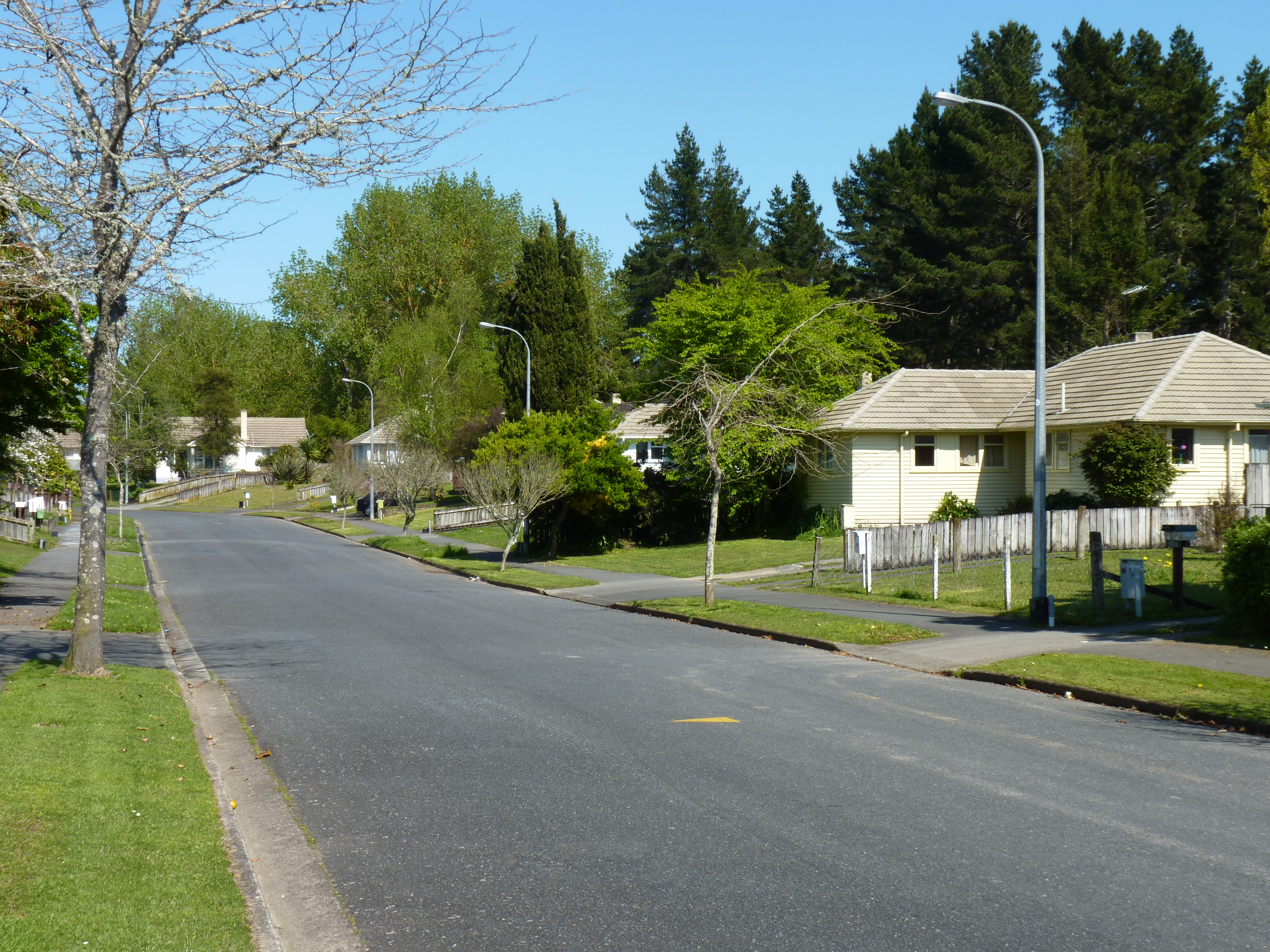
- A neighbourhood in Fitzroy, Hamilton
- Interactive map of Fitzroy
- Coordinates: 37°48′50.11″S 175°17′57.83″E
- Country: New Zealand
- City: Hamilton, New Zealand
- Local authority: Hamilton City Council
- Electoral ward: West Ward
- Established: 1974

Area
  - Land: 149 ha (370 acres)

Population (June 2025)
  - Total: 4,250
  - Density: 2,850/km^{2} (7,390/sq mi)

Hamilton West	Hamilton East
Melville	Fitzroy	Peacocke
	Glenview

Fitzroy is a suburb in southern Hamilton in New Zealand. It is named after Robert FitzRoy, who commanded HMS Beagle and was later the Governor of New Zealand. It was declared a suburb in 1974.

== Demographics ==
Fitzroy covers 1.49 km^{2} (0.58 sq mi) and had an estimated population of 4,250 as of June 2025, with a population density of 2,852 people per km^{2}.

Historical population
Year	Pop.	±% p.a.
2006	1,881	—
2013	1,872	−0.07%
2018	2,829	+8.61%
2023	3,750	+5.80%

Fitzroy had a population of 3,750 in the 2023 New Zealand census, an increase of 921 people (32.6%) since the 2018 census, and an increase of 1,878 people (100.3%) since the 2013 census. There were 1,755 males, 1,989 females and 9 people of other genders in 1,326 dwellings. 3.2% of people identified as LGBTIQ+. The median age was 35.5 years (compared with 38.1 years nationally). There were 771 people (20.6%) aged under 15 years, 738 (19.7%) aged 15 to 29, 1,539 (41.0%) aged 30 to 64, and 705 (18.8%) aged 65 or older.

People could identify as more than one ethnicity. The results were 55.4% European (Pākehā); 18.2% Māori; 5.8% Pasifika; 31.8% Asian; 2.1% Middle Eastern, Latin American and African New Zealanders (MELAA); and 2.2% other, which includes people giving their ethnicity as "New Zealander". English was spoken by 94.1%, Māori language by 4.9%, Samoan by 0.4%, and other languages by 23.7%. No language could be spoken by 3.4% (e.g. too young to talk). New Zealand Sign Language was known by 0.3%. The percentage of people born overseas was 35.2, compared with 28.8% nationally.

Religious affiliations were 44.2% Christian, 5.8% Hindu, 2.3% Islam, 1.1% Māori religious beliefs, 0.9% Buddhist, 0.5% New Age, 0.1% Jewish, and 3.2% other religions. People who answered that they had no religion were 35.4%, and 6.8% of people did not answer the census question.

Of those at least 15 years old, 891 (29.9%) people had a bachelor's or higher degree, 1,407 (47.2%) had a post-high school certificate or diploma, and 684 (23.0%) people exclusively held high school qualifications. The median income was $45,400, compared with $41,500 nationally. 231 people (7.8%) earned over $100,000 compared to 12.1% nationally. The employment status of those at least 15 was that 1,572 (52.8%) people were employed full-time, 348 (11.7%) were part-time, and 54 (1.8%) were unemployed.

== See also ==
- List of streets in Hamilton
- Suburbs of Hamilton, New Zealand
