= Euphrasie House =

Building in New Zealand

Coordinates: 37°47′27″S 175°17′40″E

- Interactive map of the Euphrasie House area
- Alternative names: Institute des Notre Dame des Missions

General information
- Status: Demolished
- Architectural style: Spanish Mission (Romanesque influenced)
- Location: Clyde Street, Hamilton, New Zealand
- Completed: 1889 (original building); 1939 (current building)
- Demolished: 2017

Design and construction
- Architect: Jack Chitty

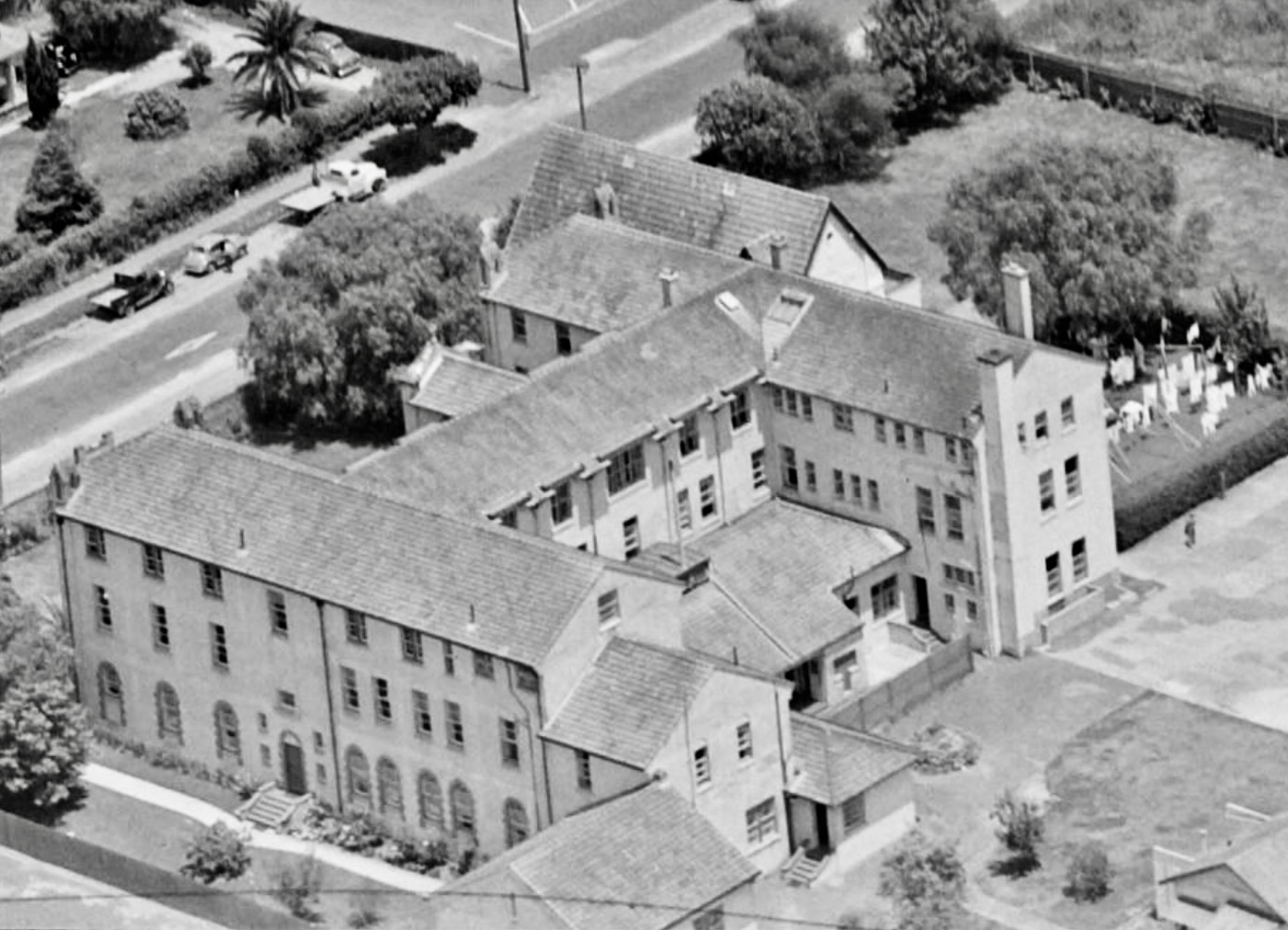
Euphrasie House in 1954

Euphrasie House was a pre-war Spanish Mission style convent in Hamilton East, New Zealand.

Only St Mary's Convent Chapel remains. It was designed in 1926 by Hamilton architect Jack Chitty. In 1930 a marble altar and a pair of angels, with a cluster of electric lights in a crown, were added. In 2017, the Euphrasie House was demolished, with exception of the chapel.

== History ==
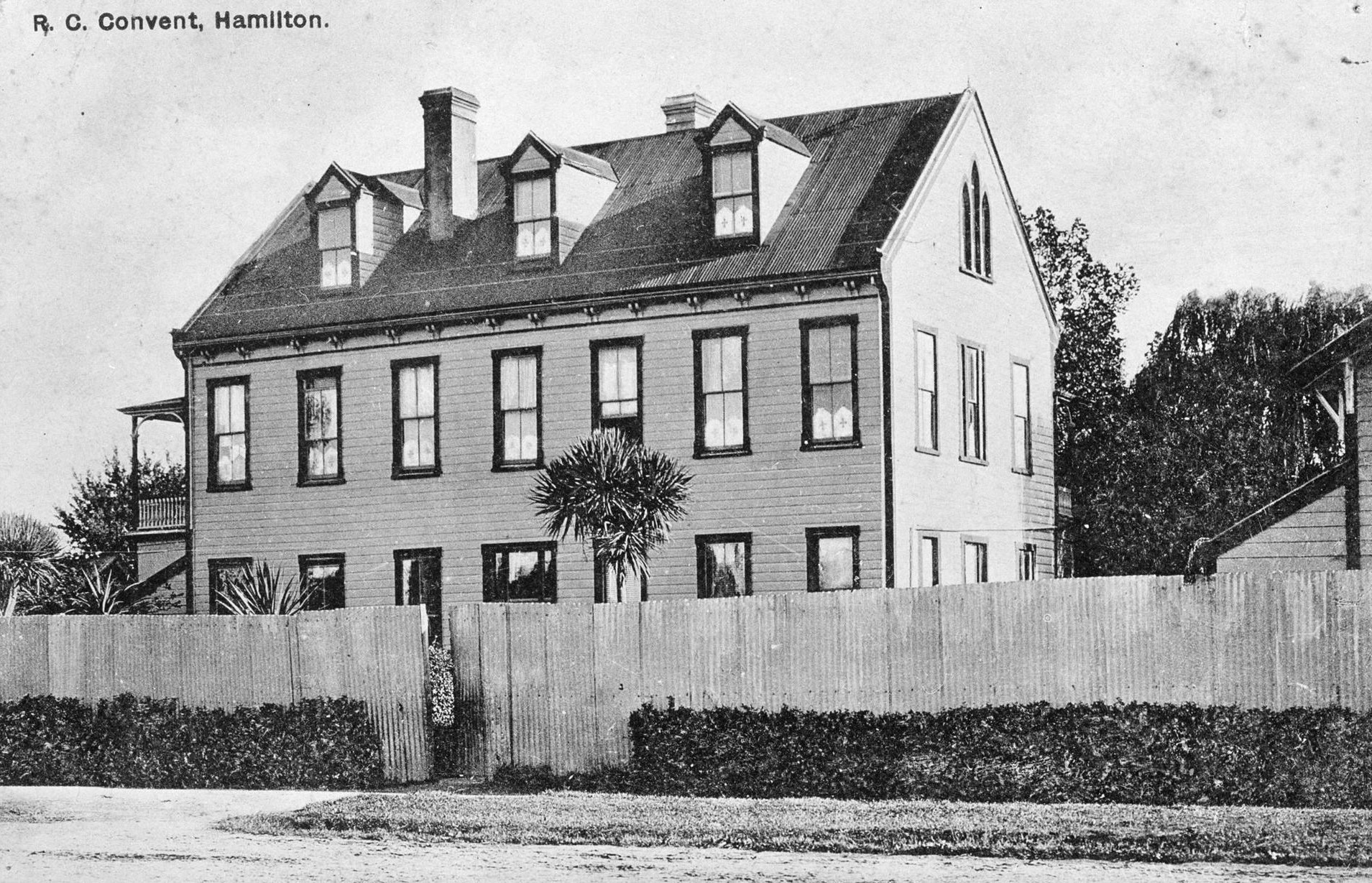
Convent replaced by Euphrasie House

The convent opened in 1899, after four nuns in 1884 had arrived in Hamilton to provide the settlers' children with Christian education. It was the first the three-storeyed building in Hamilton. By 1938 however, the original building was declared unsafe and was replaced by the current building which was built in 1939 and officially opened by then Bishop of Auckland, James Michael Liston. The building was a hostel for students of Sacred Heart Girls' College, until closing in 2011. In 2012, the building was bought by Catholic Diocese of Hamilton.

In 2012, a community group protested against a plan to demolish the building and replace it with a modern diocesan centre. Reports claimed that it would be too expensive to earthquake-proof the structure. The building that has housed thousands of school girls for several decades was marked for demolition in 2013. Euphrasie House was ranked as a "category B" building by the Hamilton City Council.

Plans for demolition of the Euphrasie House were set by 2016, with a $1 million investment to the demolition of the main building and reconstruction of the connected chapel. In 2017, the Euphrasie House was demolished, except for the chapel, heritage listed as Category 2, which was strengthened and restored.
