= Town Belt =

Town Belt is the name used for an urban green belt in New Zealand. There are several notable town belts in the country:

- Dunedin Town Belt
- Hamilton Town Belt
- Wellington Town Belt
