= Hamilton East, New Zealand =

Suburb of Hamilton, New Zealand

Hamilton East
- Suburb
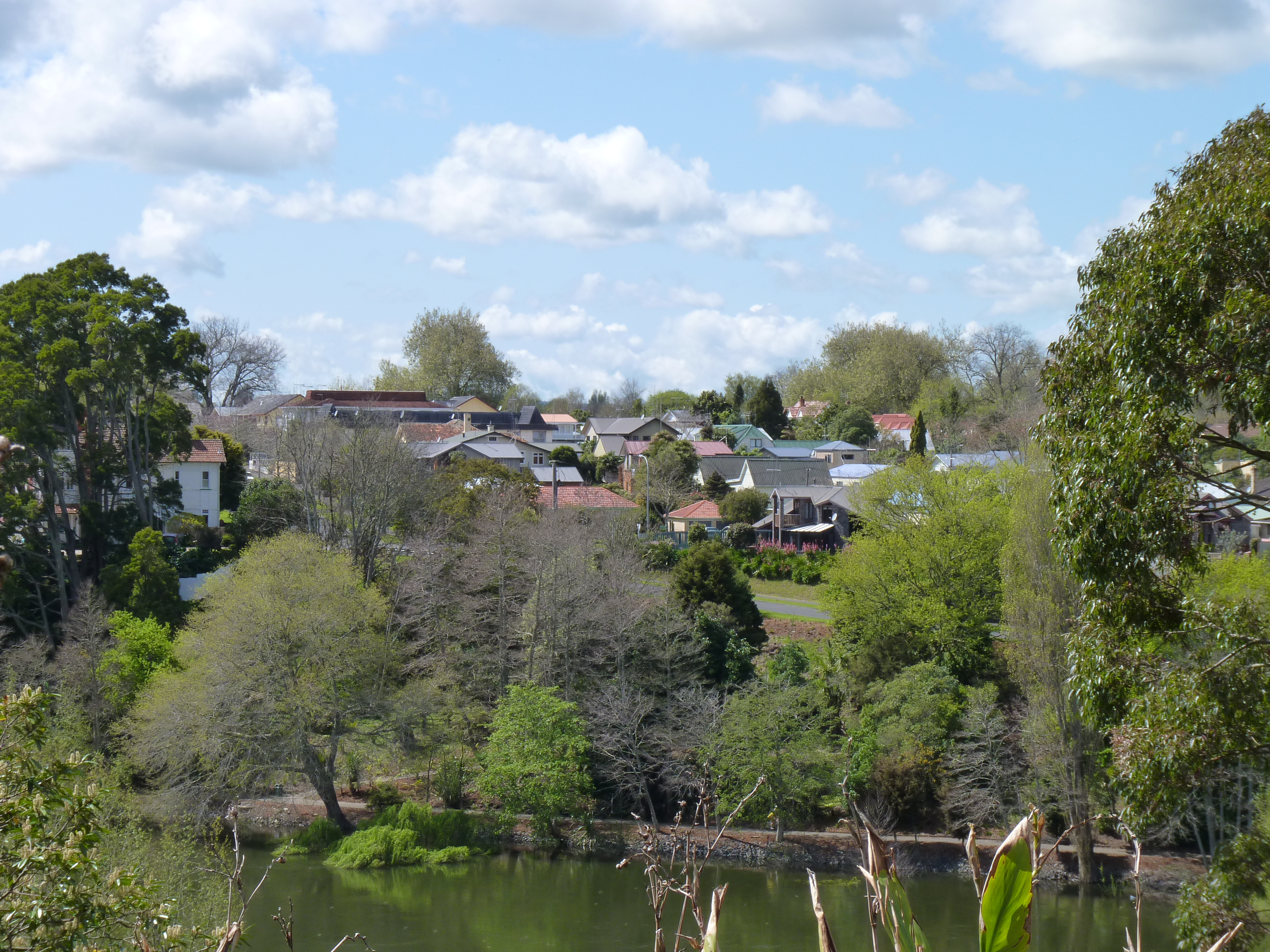
- Hamilton East, viewed from Hamilton West.
- Interactive map of Hamilton East
- Coordinates: 37°47′49″S 175°17′53″E
- Country: New Zealand
- City: Hamilton, New Zealand
- Local authority: Hamilton City Council
- Electoral ward: East Ward
- Established: 1877

Area
  - Land: 474 ha (1,170 acres)

Population (June 2025)
  - Total: 14,850
  - Density: 3,130/km^{2} (8,110/sq mi)

Hamilton Central	Claudelands	Ruakura
Hamilton West	Hamilton East	Hillcrest
	Fitzroy	Peacocke

Hamilton East is a suburb in central Hamilton in New Zealand. The suburb's primary commercial and retail precinct is located along Grey Street. Hamilton East is characterised by villas and bungalows built early in the 20th century.

== History ==
Hamilton East is one of Hamilton's oldest suburbs. From the 1870s until the mid-20th century, Hamilton East was sometimes known as 'Irishtown'. A significant number of the militiamen who settled there were of Irish descent, and many other NZ Catholics came to live near the Catholic Church and convent.

The town of Hamilton East merged with Hamilton West in 1877. Many of the streets were named after famous figures of the New Zealand Wars, including Governor George Grey and Maori chief Te Awaitaia, who went by the name William Naylor/Wiremu Neera when he converted to Christianity. Evidence of planning for the centre of the village can be seen in the village green concept of Steele Park and the planting of English trees along Grey Street. Hamilton East is one of the few suburbs of Hamilton to have a street grid plan.

Many of the parks in Hamilton East, including Hamilton Gardens, are located on the original Hamilton Town Belt that runs along the eastern and southern border of Hamilton East.

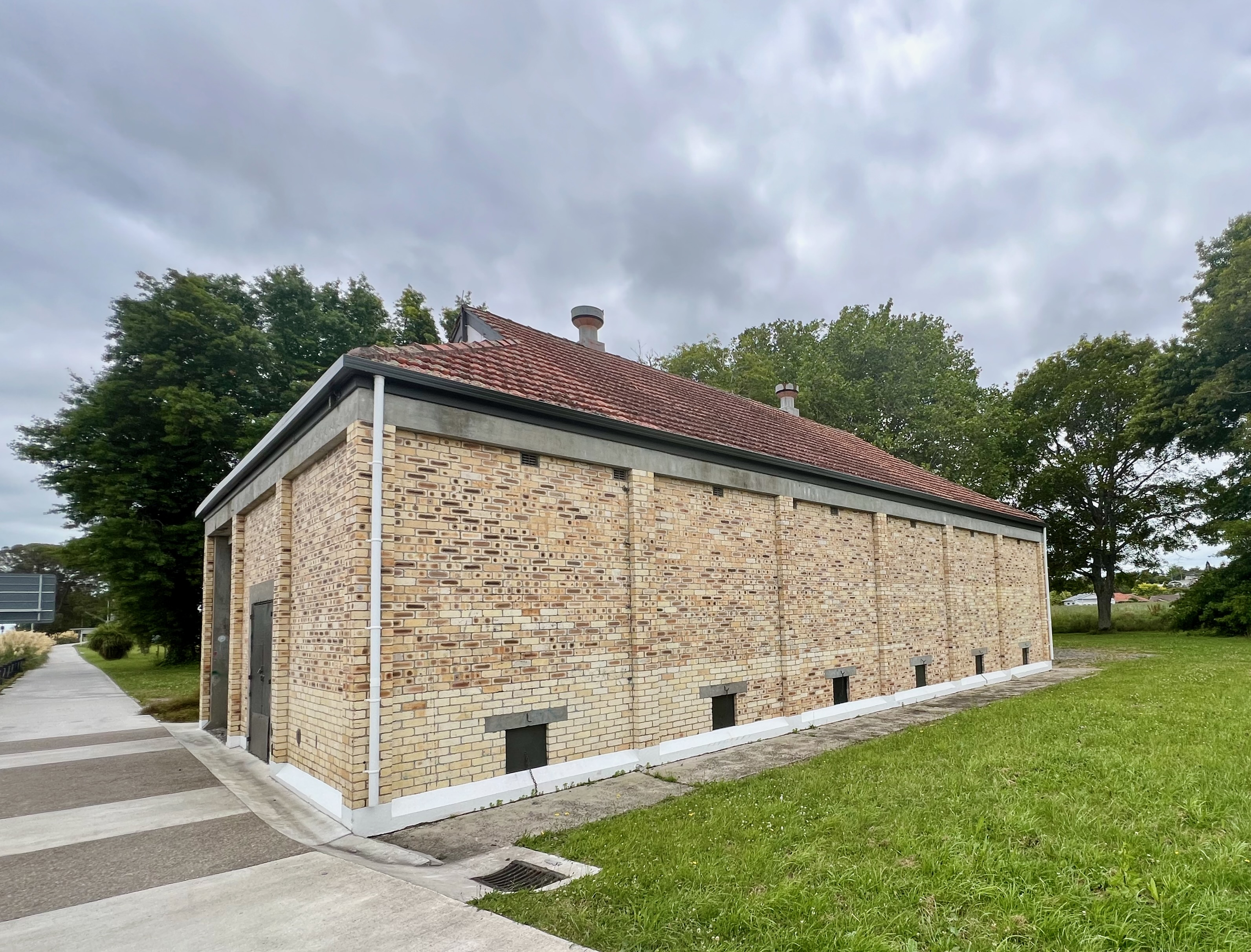
Flynn Park 1942 magazine storage building and cycleway in 2023

Just to the north of the Gardens, Flynn Park housed an ammunition factory from 1942 to 1946. It is the most southerly of the parks in the original Belt and on the edge of the Wairere Drive extension to Peacocke.

The first Royal Hotel was opened on the southwest corner of Grey and Cook Streets in July 1865, by Lewis Bassiere Harris, of the 4th Waikato Militia Regiment. The hotel burnt down in 1894 and was rebuilt later that year. Many early meetings were held in the hotel, including those of Kirikiriroa Road Board. Until February 1971 the Royal Hotel stood on that corner. The corner is now occupied by a tavern and liquor store.

In 2000 the suburb was extended over a former part of Ruakura Experimental Farm, by Grasshopper East Ltd. and Chedworth Properties Ltd adding 321 houses at Sherwood Park. Although the streets are named with a Sherwood Forest theme, it required a campaign to preserve a shelter belt of redwood trees from the development.

== Features of Hamilton East ==
=== Hamilton Gardens ===
Hamilton Gardens, a 58 hectare public park, is located along the banks of the Waikato River. Hamilton Gardens is the most popular visitor attraction in the region with about 1.3 million visitors each year, nearly half of them being tourists. They were developed from the 1980s in stages, with paradise, productive, cultivar and landscape collections. The much-praised paradise collection includes a Chinese scholar's garden, an English flower garden, a Japanese garden of contemplation, an American modernist garden, an Italian Renaissance garden and an Indian char bagh garden.

=== Hayes Paddock ===
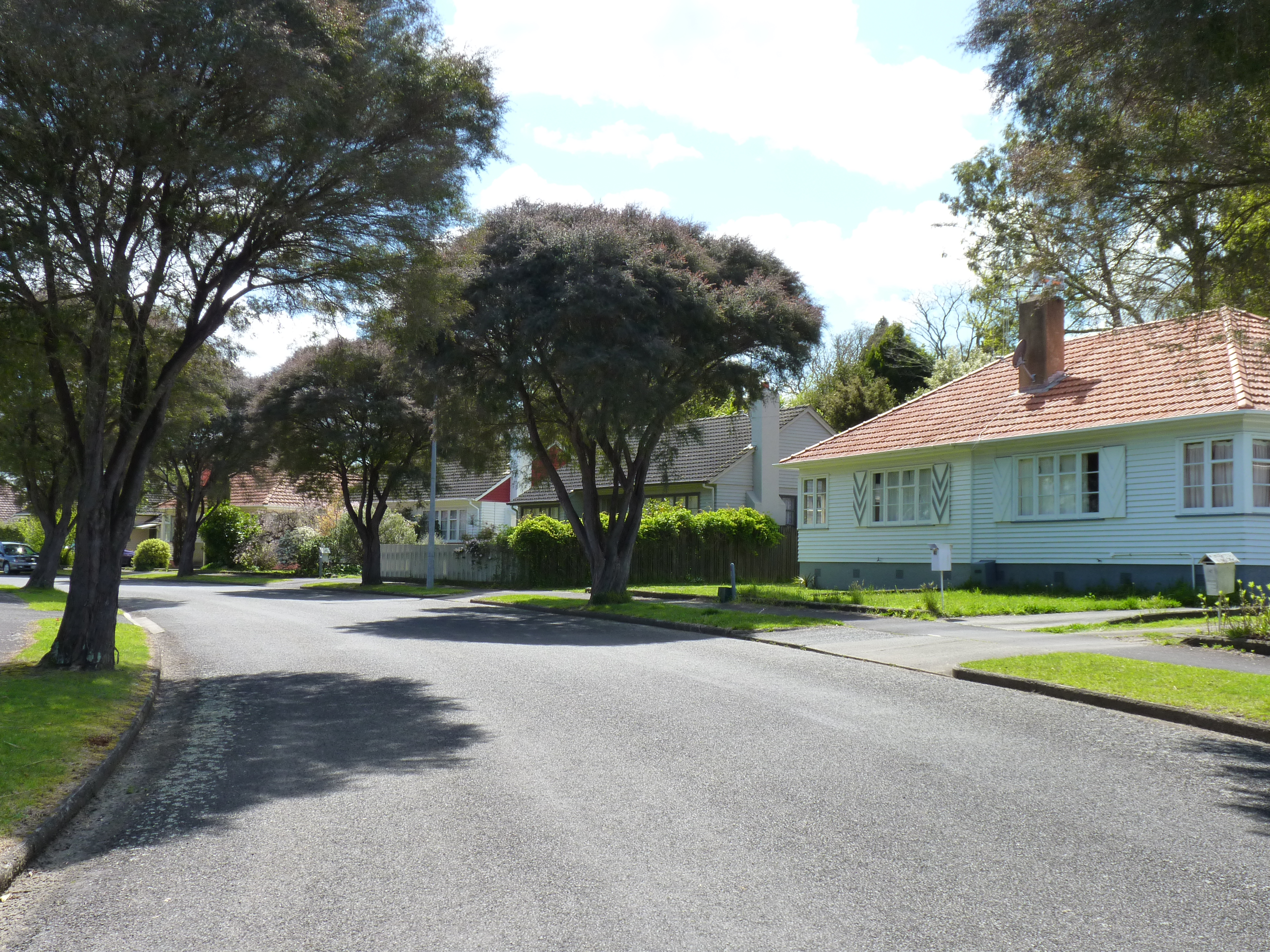
Hayes Paddock, Hamilton East.

Hayes Paddock, an enclave in Hamilton East developed between 1939 and 1945, was planned and built according to the philosophies and ideals of the First Labour Government and the Garden City Movement. It includes curved street patterns, open plan garden layouts, low density development, and the provision of walkways and reserves. Hayes Paddock contains over 200 classic state houses built along seven streets named mostly after New Zealand governors general.

These governors general were notable and influential men of their time. Macfarlane Street, the only street not named after a governor general, was named after James MacFarlane, a partner in the Auckland company of Henderson and MacFarlane. The area that makes up Hayes Paddock was named after William Hayes who farmed the area, under lease, from 1903 to 1925.

- Viscount Sir Charles Bathurst Bledisloe Governor general from 1930–1935. Street: Bledisloe Terrace.
- Sir Charles Fergusson Governor general from 1924–1930. Street: Fergusson Street.
- Sir George Monckton-Arundell, 8th Viscount Galway Governor general from 1935–1941. Street: Galway Avenue.
- Viscount Sir John Rushworth Jellicoe Governor general from 1920–1924. Street: Jellicoe Drive.
- Sir William Lee Plunket Governor general from 1904–1910. Street: Plunket Terrace.
- Sir William Hillier Onslow Governor general from 1889–1892. Street: Onslow Street.

Thanks to Hamilton heritage enthusiasts and local council processes, Hayes Paddock has received protection in the city's district plan. The purpose of this protection was to safeguard the unique and special heritage of the Hayes Paddock area.

An extensive chronology of key events from 1978, when Hayes paddock was first identified as having heritage value, to the May 2006 Council Report leading to the council decision, can be found in the Variation to Hamilton City District Plan version 2001.

A final hearing of proposed changes was held in July 2008 and on 24 September 2008 a full Council confirmed the changes, subject to some amendments.

==== Graham Island ====
Graham Island is a small islet of about 0.2 ha (0.49 acres), separated from the main river bank south of Hayes Paddock by about 5 m (16 ft) of shallow water. It rises to about 4 m (13 ft) above the river, with a low cliff facing the main channel. Most of the island is covered in raspberry, with alder and silver and golden wattle as the main trees. Te Moutere O Koipikau Pā once stood on the island.

==== Wellington Street Beach ====
A beach was part of the 1945 plan for developing the reserve. In 2013 it was voted one of the country's best beaches.

=== Institute de Notre Dames des Missions ===
The Institute de Notre Dames des Missions was a Romanesque style convent and heritage site on Clyde St. Most of the building was demolished in 2017, but the chapel was restored and is a Category 2 listed building.

=== Cathedral of the Blessed Virgin Mary, Hamilton ===
The modern Cathedral of the Blessed Virgin Mary was dedicated in 1980 and refurbished in 2008. It is the cathedral of the Hamilton Catholic Diocese.

=== Memorial Park ===
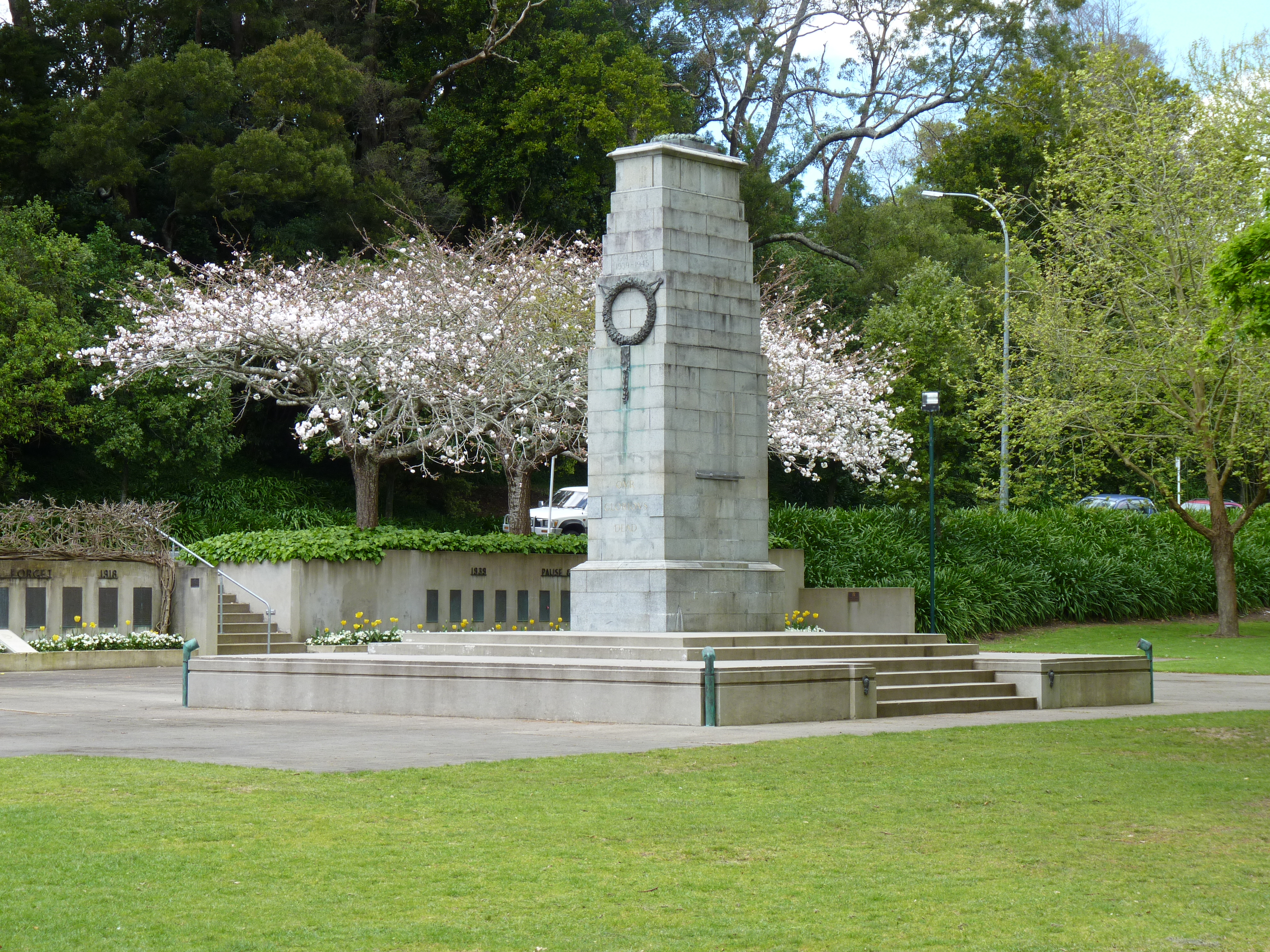
Cenotaph at Memorial Park

Hamilton's first militia settlers landed on this site in 1864. The park and cenotaph were created in memory of First World War soldiers on what was previously called Kowhai Bank. The park was further developed with a Second World War memorial as well as a Spitfire air-force memorial. On 11 November 2017, a life-size bronze memorial of a war horse was officially unveiled, as a commemoration of the various war horses that fought for New Zealand during the First World War, as well as to commemorate 99 years since the end of the First World War.

==== Paddle steamer Rangiriri ====
On the riverbank is the hulk of the paddle steamer Rangiriri. She was prefabricated at the P.N. Russell & Co. foundry in Sydney and assembled at Port Waikato. The first of the military settlers landed from the Rangiriri at Hamilton on 24 August 1864. She ran aground in 1889, was lifted from the riverbed in 1981, pulled further up in 1982 and restored in 2010. Her length was 90 ft 6 in (27.58 m), breadth 20 ft (6.1 m) and speed 6 knots (11 km/h; 6.9 mph).

==== River cruises ====
From 1985 MV Waipa Delta provided excursions from the Park until 2009. She was replaced by a smaller boat until the pontoon at the Park was removed in 2013. The former Golden Bay vessel, Cynthia Dew, ran 4 days a week on the river from 2012, then ran 5 days a week from a floating pontoon, until liquidation in September 2022.

=== Parana Park ===
Parana Park is about 1.2 hectares (3.0 acres) and forms a northern extension of Memorial Park. It was left to the city in 1929 in the will of George Parr (hence the name Parana), who was the son of the 1893 Mayor. In 1936, a paddling pool and playground were built and wallabies and a possum introduced. The playground was rebuilt in 2012. There are several notable trees and structures in the Park. In Gibbons Creek a barrier was removed and 3 fish passes built to help migratory fish overcome weirs.

=== Steele Park ===
At the centre of Hamilton East is Steele Park, named for militia officer William Steele. It was originally called Sydney Square, after the New South Wales city where members of the 4th Waikato militia enlisted. The oaks around its perimeter were planted in 1889, the silver jubilee of the arrival of militia settlers. Historically used for social gatherings for settlers, today it continues to be an important venue for sport, cultural and social events.

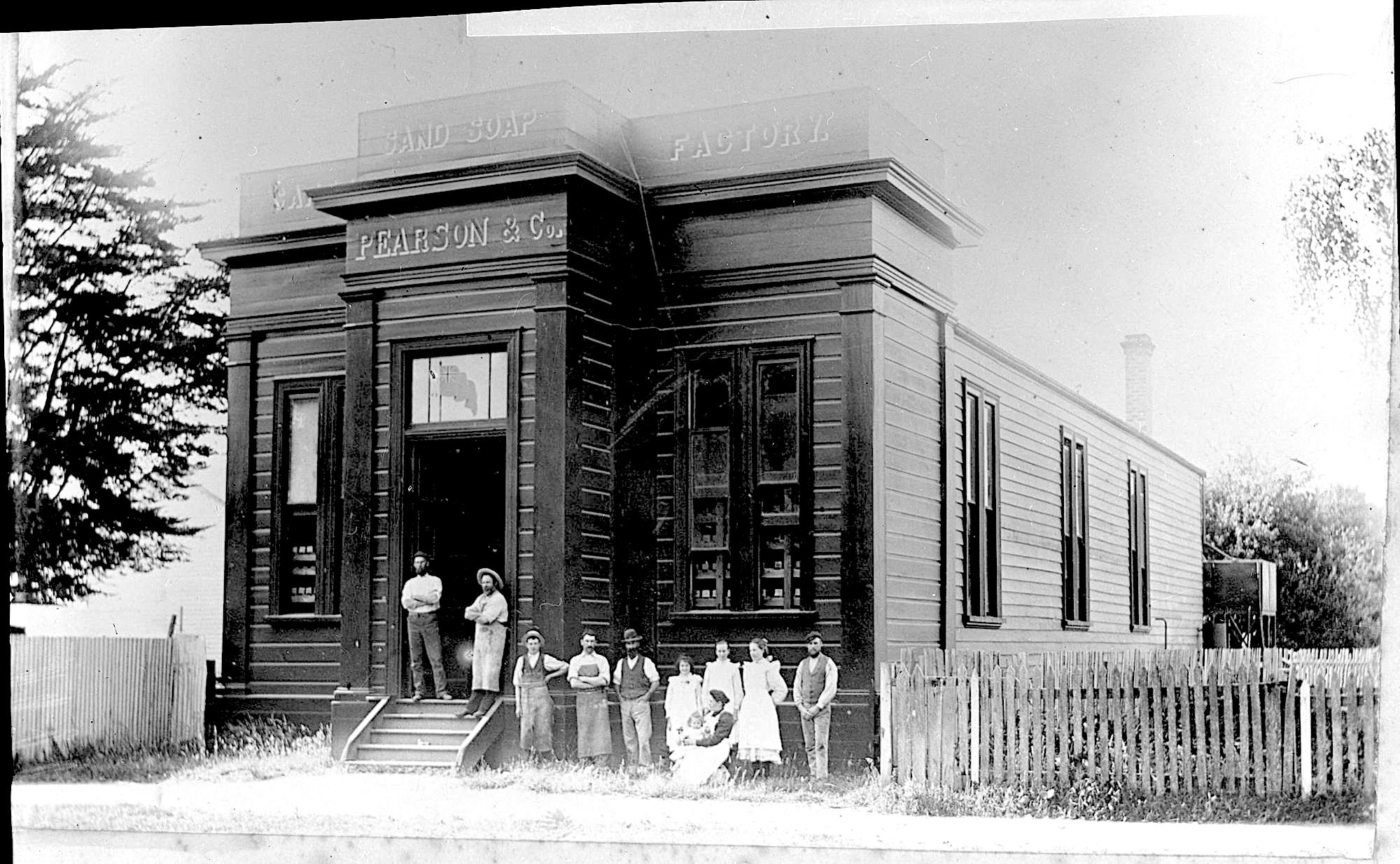
Pearson's carbolic sand soap factory in about 1900

==== Oddfellows Hall ====
The Loyal Hamilton Lodge of the Independent Order of Oddfellows was built by Edward Pearson in 1874 on the perimeter of Steele Park. It is now a Historic Place Category 2 building housing the Cook bar. From about 1884 it was used as a factory by the family who had built it a decade earlier. Pearson's sandsoap was advertised from 1882, took out a patent in 1884, started a factory in Sydney in 1892 and later moved production to Penrose. Prior to 1934 some of their sand came from what is now Edgecumbe Park in Whitiora. Edward Pearson also built a nearby Presbyterian church, which was demolished in 1957.

=== Galloway Park ===
A former redoubt, Galloway Park is now an active sports park utilised for a variety of summer and winter sports. In summer, it is primarily used for cricket and in winter, it is primarily used for soccer.

=== Greenslade House ===
Greenslade House is a distinctive Edwardian house, with a turret, at 1 Wellington Street. It was built between 1910–1912 for a prominent Hamilton businessman and New Zealand Liberal Party MP, Henry Greenslade. The architect, John W Warren, also helped design the Waikato Hospital. The Pearson family (see Oddfellows Hall above) lived in the house from 1934. It remains a private residence, was given Historic Place Category 1 listing on 21 September 1989, is a large 490 with 5 bedrooms and 4 bathrooms and has been sold many times since restoration in the 1970s.

=== Beale Cottage ===
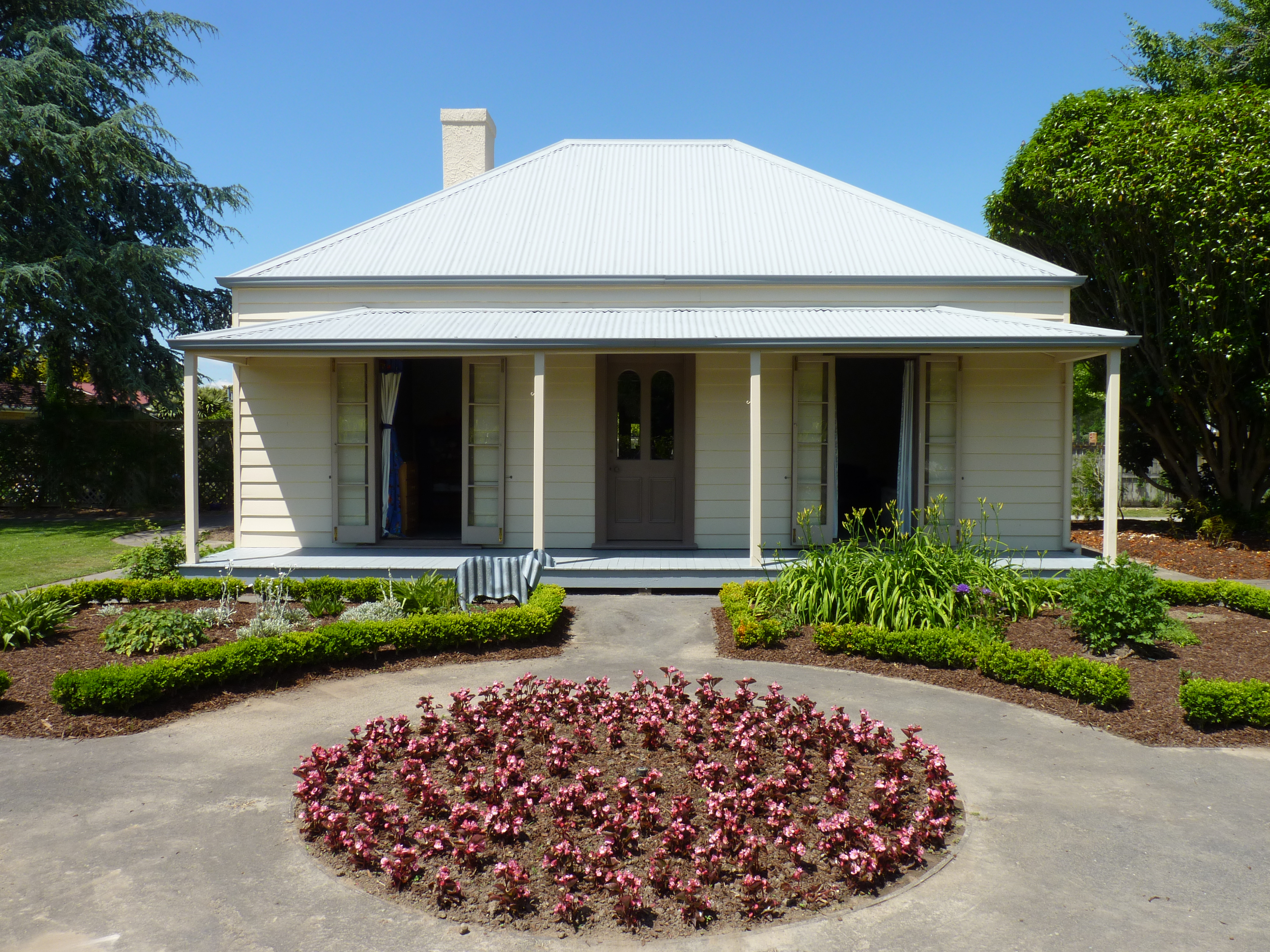
Beale Cottage

The tiny cottage on the corner of Beale and Grey Streets is Hamilton's oldest remaining house, named after the 4th Mayor of Hamilton, Bernard Charles Beale. He designed and built the simple cottage in 1872 using locally-grown kauri and kahikatea. Soon after, he added several more rooms. One room in the house was used as a surgery.

=== Nga Uri o Hinetuparimaunga ===
Located at the entrance to Hamilton Gardens, Nga Uri o Hinetuparimaunga is a sculpture created by two internationally renowned artists, sculptor Chris Booth and Diggeress Te Kanawa. Their design proposal was chosen in a competition to which top New Zealand artists had been invited to submit designs. The woven Hinuera stone cloak sculpture honours natural creative processes.

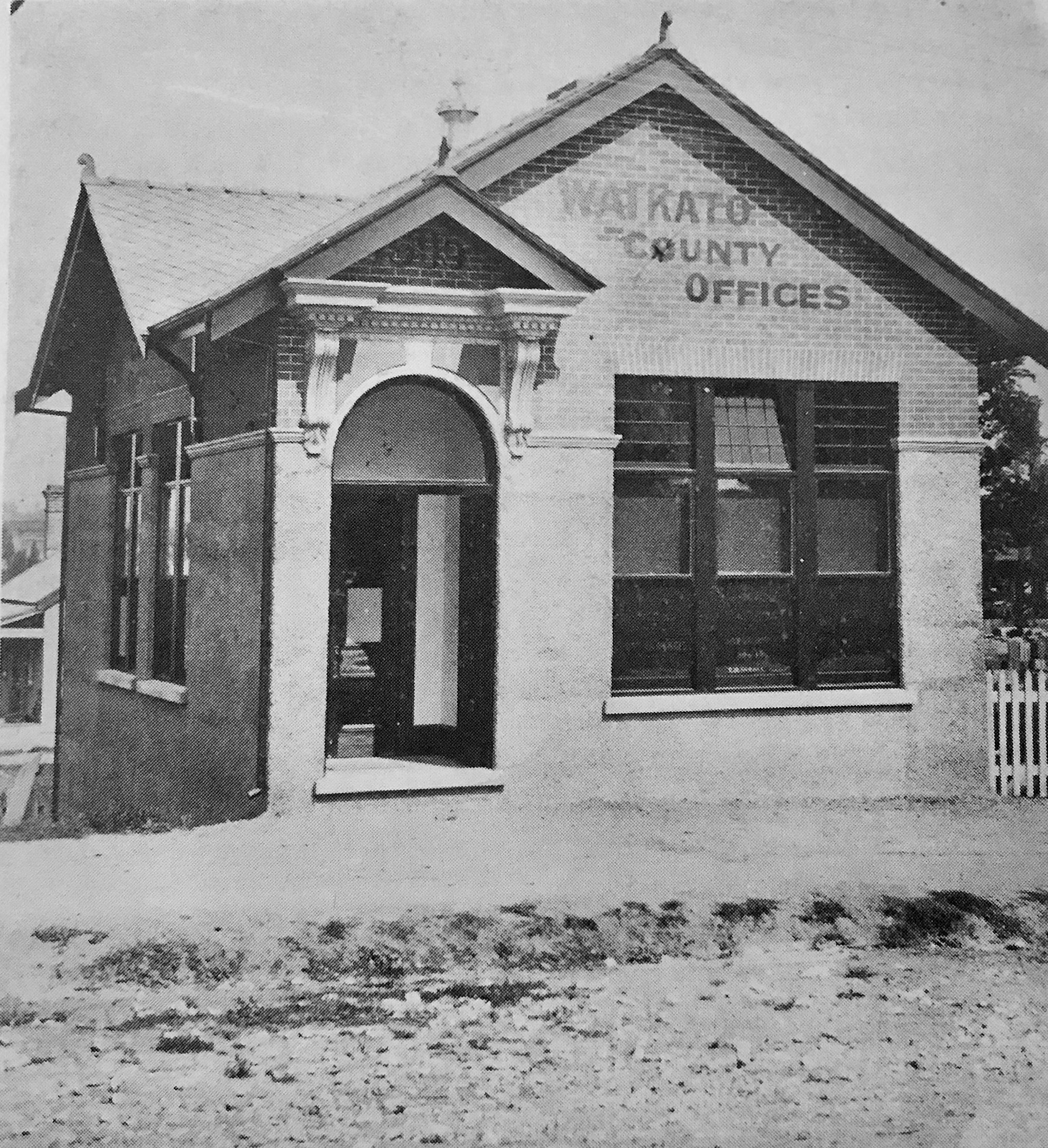
Waikato County Office about 1910

=== Former Waikato County Council office ===
The former Waikato County Council office at 455 Grey Street, on the corner of Clyde Street, opened in 1910. It has not been greatly altered and is now used by a travel agent. It is protected by a Category B listing in Hamilton City's District Plan. It was replaced by new offices to the rear of it, which had a foundation stone dated 4 February 1971 and were first used for a meeting on 21 March 1972. The old building was leased to the Ministry of Agriculture. After 1989 the new building was used by Waikato District Council and then by Hill Laboratories until 2017. Since 2020 it has been renovated as Hills Village apartments.

== Demographics ==
Hamilton East covers 4.74 km^{2} (1.83 sq mi) and had an estimated population of 14,850 as of June 2025, with a population density of 3,146 people per km^{2}.

Historical population
Year	Pop.	±% p.a.
2006	10,713	—
2013	11,532	+1.06%
2018	12,849	+2.19%
2023	13,371	+0.80%

Hamilton East had a population of 13,371 in the 2023 New Zealand census, an increase of 522 people (4.1%) since the 2018 census, and an increase of 1,839 people (15.9%) since the 2013 census. There were 6,543 males, 6,720 females and 108 people of other genders in 4,941 dwellings. 6.4% of people identified as LGBTIQ+. There were 2,346 people (17.5%) aged under 15 years, 4,392 (32.8%) aged 15 to 29, 5,454 (40.8%) aged 30 to 64, and 1,179 (8.8%) aged 65 or older.

People could identify as more than one ethnicity. The results were 56.0% European (Pākehā); 26.2% Māori; 7.7% Pasifika; 22.8% Asian; 3.8% Middle Eastern, Latin American and African New Zealanders (MELAA); and 2.1% other, which includes people giving their ethnicity as "New Zealander". English was spoken by 94.6%, Māori language by 7.9%, Samoan by 0.9%, and other languages by 19.9%. No language could be spoken by 2.7% (e.g. too young to talk). New Zealand Sign Language was known by 0.8%. The percentage of people born overseas was 32.6, compared with 28.8% nationally.

Religious affiliations were 31.0% Christian, 4.9% Hindu, 3.7% Islam, 1.7% Māori religious beliefs, 1.6% Buddhist, 0.5% New Age, 0.1% Jewish, and 2.8% other religions. People who answered that they had no religion were 48.3%, and 5.8% of people did not answer the census question.

Of those at least 15 years old, 3,375 (30.6%) people had a bachelor's or higher degree, 5,277 (47.9%) had a post-high school certificate or diploma, and 2,388 (21.7%) people exclusively held high school qualifications. 813 people (7.4%) earned over $100,000 compared to 12.1% nationally. The employment status of those at least 15 was that 5,442 (49.4%) people were employed full-time, 1,554 (14.1%) were part-time, and 591 (5.4%) were unemployed.

Individual statistical areas
Name	Area (km^{2})	Population	Density (per km^{2})	Dwellings	Median age	Median income
Hamilton East Village	1.32	3,117	2,361	1,368	32.9 years	$36,700
Greensboro	0.47	4,098	8,716	1,347	23.7 years	$25,000
Hamilton East Cook	0.73	2,175	2,979	735	30.2 years	$37,700
Hamilton East	2.22	3,981	1,793	1,491	35.2 years	$44,500
New Zealand					38.1 years	$41,500

The 2013 Index of Socioeconomic Deprivation, ranked 1–10 from lowest to most deprived areas, lists the Hamilton East at 9/10 (high deprivation).

== Education ==
Hamilton Boys' High School is a single sex secondary school (years 9–13). It has a roll of 2,281. The school opened in 1955, with predecessors dating back to 1903.

Hamilton East School is a coeducational contributing primary school (years 1–6). The school was opened in 1872 and is the oldest school in Hamilton on its original site. It has a roll of 517.

Sacred Heart Girls' College' is a single sex state-integrated Catholic day school (years 9–13). The school was established in 1884 and has a roll of 937.

Marian Catholic School is a state-integrated coeducational full primary school (years 1–8). The school was formed in 1989 by the amalgamation of the single-sex St Mary's Cathedral School and Marist School, which had been neighbours on the same site. It has a roll of 619.

All rolls are as of July 2026.

== See also ==
- List of streets
- Suburbs of Hamilton, New Zealand
