= Hamilton Town Belt =

Public park series in New Zealand

Coordinates: 37°47′41.27″S 175°18′30.27″E

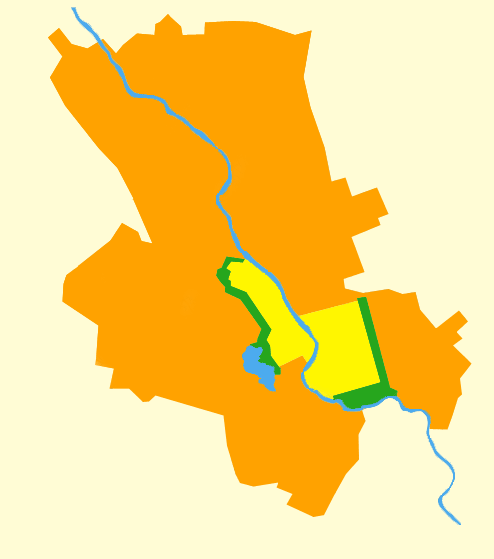
Hamilton Town Belt in green, original city size in yellow.

The Hamilton Town Belt, also known as the Green Belt, is a series of public parks in Hamilton, New Zealand that surround the original 1877 city boundaries. Many of the city's notable venues and attractions are located on the belt, including Hamilton Gardens, Waikato Stadium, Seddon Park, Hamilton Girls' High School and the Hamilton Lake Domain.

The eastern section of the belt separates the suburbs of Hamilton East and Hillcrest.

== See also ==
- Suburbs of Hamilton, New Zealand
