= Hill Labs =

Privately owned analytical laboratory in New Zealand

Hill Labs is a privately owned analytical laboratory in New Zealand, which provides testing services for the domestic and agricultural, environmental and food sectors.

== Services ==
Hill Labs is New Zealand's largest privately owned analytical laboratory. Hill Labs provides testing for the agricultural, environmental and food sectors in domestic New Zealand and overseas markets. Hill Labs has facilities in Hamilton, Christchurch, Blenheim, Auckland, Wellington and Tauranga.

Testing by Hill Labs has been used for a wide variety purposes, such as testing for Legionella in water samples, quantifying heavy metals in yellow-eyed penguin necropsy samples and testing alcohol contents in organic kombucha. Hill Labs has published quality guidelines for agricultural soil nutrient statuses and co-developed national standards in New Zealand for discrete water quality sampling. During the COVID-19 pandemic, Hill Labs in Hamilton provided covid testing services for the Waikato District Health Board. Their laboratory in Tauranga provides kiwifruit maturity testing services for Zespri. Hills Labs also provides 'Manuka5' tests, which use four chemical markers and a DNA marker to scientifically authenticate New Zealand mānuka honey against standards set by the Ministry for Primary Industries.

== History ==
Hill Labs was founded by Roger and Anne Hill in 1984. In 2018, their son Jonno Hill became CEO.

Between 2019 and 2022, former laboratories owned by Hill Labs in Hamilton were converted into residential apartments.

In 2020, Hill Labs opened a laboratory in Tauranga to provide kiwifruit maturity and collection services for Zespri.
