= Hamilton Gardens =

Garden park in Hamilton, New Zealand

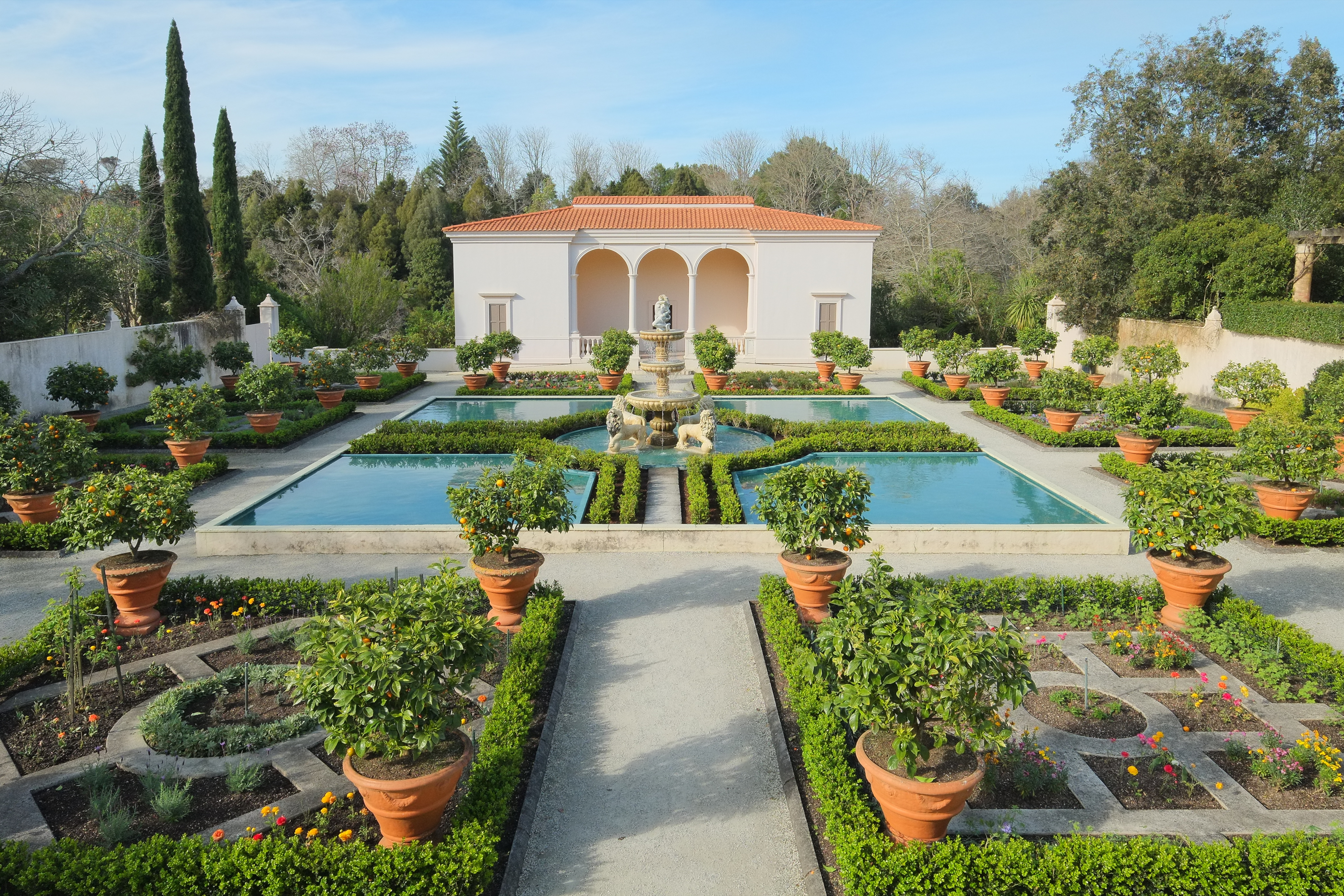
- Interactive map of Hamilton Gardens
- Location: Hamilton East, New Zealand
- Coordinates: 37.8046°S 175.3039°E
- Created: 1960s
- Operator: Hamilton City Council
- Visitors: One million per year

Hamilton Gardens is a public garden park in the south of Hamilton owned and managed by Hamilton City Council in New Zealand. The 54 ha (130 acres) park is based on the banks of the Waikato River and includes enclosed gardens, open lawns, a lake, a nursery, a convention centre and the Hamilton East Cemetery. It is the Waikato region's most popular visitor attraction, attracting more than 1 million people and hosting more than 2,000 events a year.

Hamilton Gardens is described in popular culture as a botanical garden, but does not technically qualify as a botanical garden. Instead, the site features 28 gardens representing the art, beliefs, lifestyles and traditions of different civilisations or historical garden styles. These gardens are grouped into the Paradise, Productive, Fantasy, Cultivar and Landscape garden collections, and there is space for gardens which are still in development.

The first development of the gardens began in the early 1960s at what was then the city's waste disposal site. The first substantial development, the Rogers Rose Garden, was opened in 1971 in an attempt to block highway development over the site. Since 1982 many newly developed areas have been opened to the public. Additional features of the gardens now include a lake walkway and a waterfall lookout.

== History ==
=== Early development ===
In 1960, four acres of what had been the Hamilton East Town Belt was passed over to Hamilton City Council for use as a public garden. An opening ceremony for Hamilton Gardens was held on 24 July 1960. The design of this area was, and still is, firmly in the Gardenesque tradition, with specimen trees and flower beds set in flat lawns. In 1971 Hamilton was to host the first World Rose Convention. At that time Hamilton had rose gardens at the Lake Domain, but these were limited in size, so a new rose garden was established at Hamilton Gardens. It was named after Dr Denis Rogers, mayor of Hamilton from 1959 to 1968.

In the late 1970s, a new concept for Hamilton Gardens was developed. This new concept would see Hamilton Gardens depart from the traditional botanic garden model, partially because of the proximity of Auckland Botanic Gardens. The focus of Hamilton Gardens was to be on garden design, rather than on botanical science. This concept was developed in three stages through the 1980s, 1990s and 2000s to form five garden collections. The first of the Paradise Gardens were opened in 1992.

=== Garden development ===
Trusts were set up to raise funds for specific gardens, including the Rose Garden Committee, the Chinese Garden Trust, the Japanese Garden Trust, the Modernist Garden Trust, the Indian Char Bagh Garden Trust, the Italian Renaissance Garden Trust and Te Parapara Garden Trust.

In 2015, the Hamilton Gardens Development Trust was seeking to raise $7.03 million to develop the Mansfield, Concept, Picturesque and the Surrealist Gardens, and the first stage of a car park extension. A third of this was raised through a targeted rate of $10 per Hamilton City household per year for four years. Another third was secured in June 2015 from the Lottery Significant Project Funds Committee. The full funding was expected to be finalised by 2016. Other planned developments included a playground, three central courts, an Italian Renaissance Pavilion jetty and security cameras.

== Awards and recognition ==
=== Hamilton Gardens Rose ===
Hamilton Gardens, a rose named after the gardens, was released on the market in 2008. It was discovered at Hamilton Gardens as a naturally occurring mutation of Paddy Stephens, which was a rose cultivated by rose expert Sam McGredy and like its predecessor has long stems, well formed blooms, and high disease tolerance. The New Zealand Rose Society describes its colour as "an appealing blend of apricot, pink and cream" and says it grows about 1.5 metres. The rose was selected as the 10th most popular Hybrid Tea Rose in a New Zealand rose survey 2009, and was featured at rose events at Hamilton Gardens like the Pacific Rose Bowl Festival, the New Zealand Rose of the Year and the National Spring Rose Show.

=== International Garden Tourism Awards ===
Hamilton Gardens won the Garden of the Year award at the International Garden Tourism Awards in Metz, France in 2014, after being selected by a global jury of garden experts. Previous winners of the award for "the world's great and unique gardens" include Singapore Botanic Gardens and the Gardens of Trauttmansdorff Castle in Merano, Italy.

World Garden Tourism Network president Richard Benfield praised the garden's plantings, compartmentalised design, educational value and visual impact. He said visitors were greeted with surprises in each individual garden, and the gardens were linked to the river valley and hence central Hamilton. He says the gardens were nominated for the award because of the maturity of their development, and the strategic plan the council had in place for its future development. Benfield described the gardens as unique in the world, and "visually spectacular".

=== Critical reception ===
Lonely Planet encourages visitors to the gardens to see the "extravagant themed enclosed gardens" with "colonnades, pagodas and a mini Taj Mahal". They also recommend the pre-colonial Te Parapara garden and Ngā Uri O Hinetuparimaunga earth blanket statue at the main gates. Blogger David Farrer described Hamilton Gardens as a "hidden treasure" and a "great place to spend half a day".

== Supporters ==
=== Friends of Hamilton Gardens ===
The Friends of Hamilton Gardens, a volunteer association set up to support the development of the gardens, have been involved in the development of most gardens and projects. Members of the association have run the Hamilton Gardens Information Centre since the early 1990s, staffing it every day of the year except Good Friday and Christmas Day.

=== Donors ===
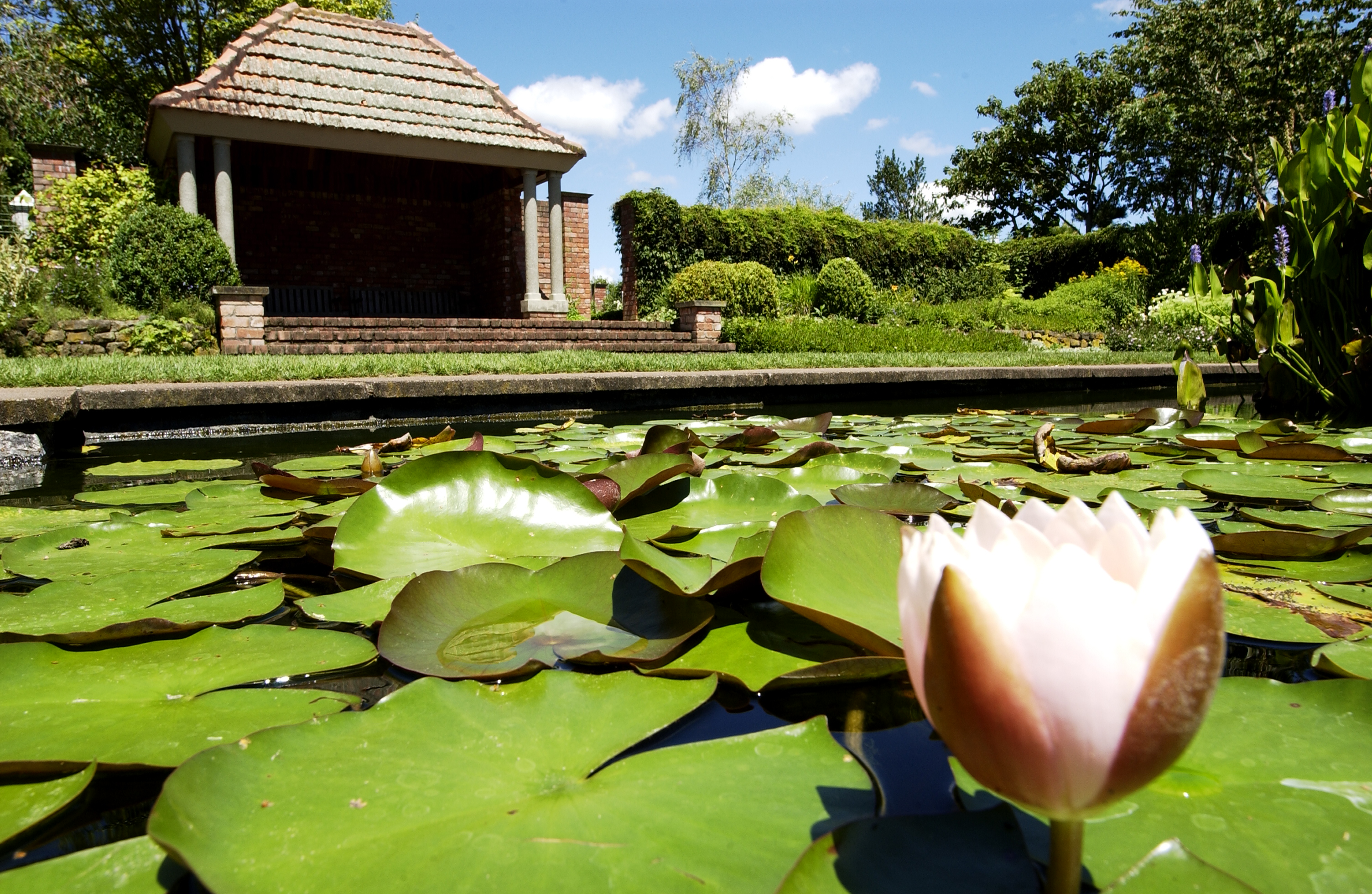
The English Flower Garden was made with significant funding from former Hamilton mayor Kathleen Braithwaite.

Several trusts have helped with fundraising and organisation at the gardens. The Hamilton Gardens Building Trust raised the money needed to build the Hamilton Gardens Pavilion, the Waikato Rose Society supported the Rogers Rose Garden, the Waikato Herb Society supported the Herb Garden, and the Waikato Camellia Society supported the development of the Camellia Garden. Former Hamilton mayor Kathleen Braithwaite has been a major sponsor of the English Flower Garden and future development projects. Muriel House made a substantial sponsorship towards the Modernist Garden, and the Russian Bell Tower Trust raised the money needed for the Hamilton Gardens Russian Bell Tower.

Organisations have been involved in organising particular events. The Garden World Trust organised large Gardenworld Festivals at Hamilton Gardens, and the Waikato Garden Festival Trust has organised festivals and fundraising. The Hamilton Gardens Entertainment Trust organised the annual Turtle Lake Concert each year to raise funds for the garden's development. The Hamilton Garden Summer Festival Foundation has organised the Hamilton Gardens Arts Festival since its second year, and the Pacific Rose Bowl Trust was set up to look after the Pacific Rose Bowl Festival.

== Gardens ==
=== Paradise Garden Collection ===
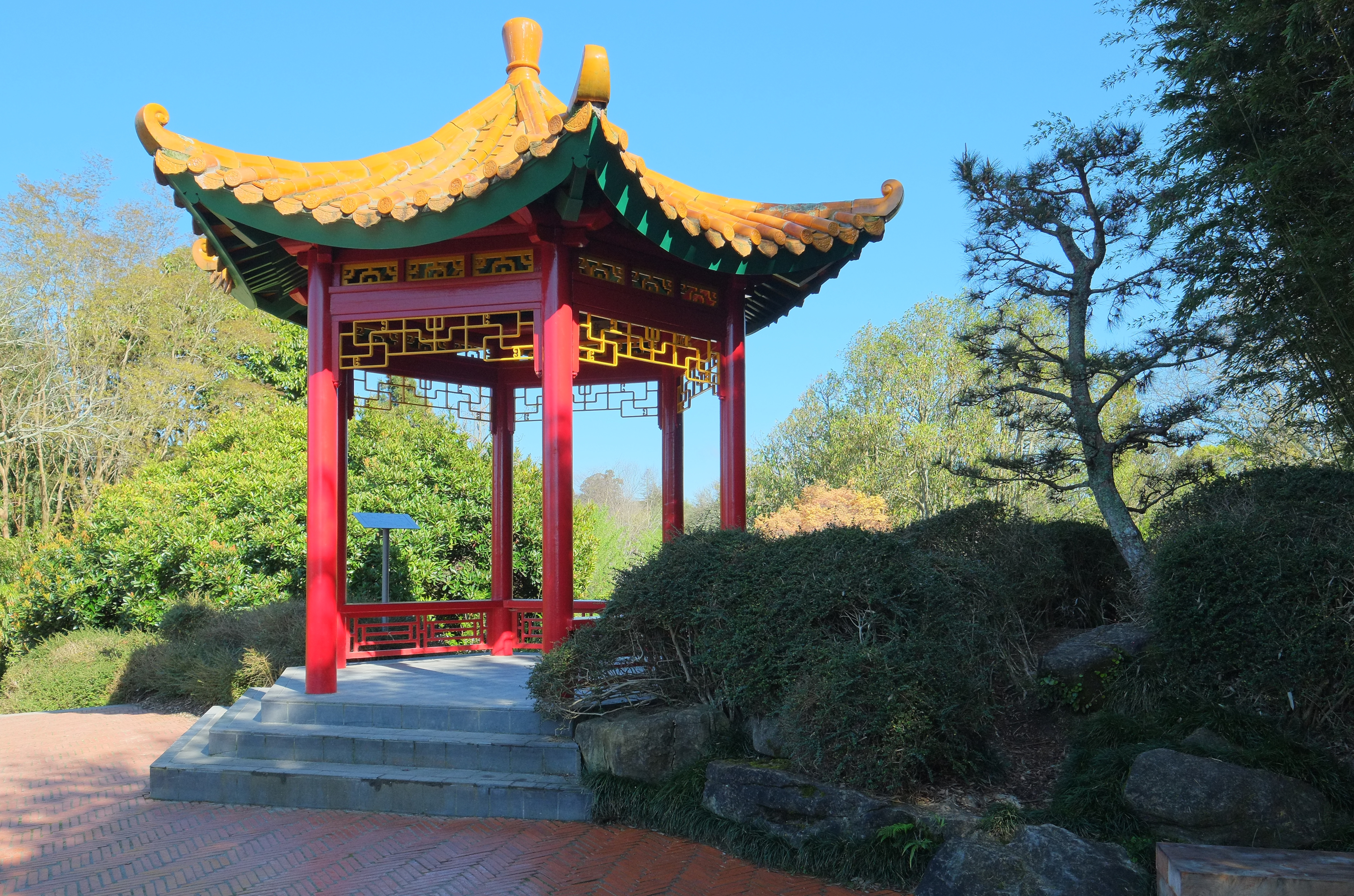
Chinese Scholar's Garden

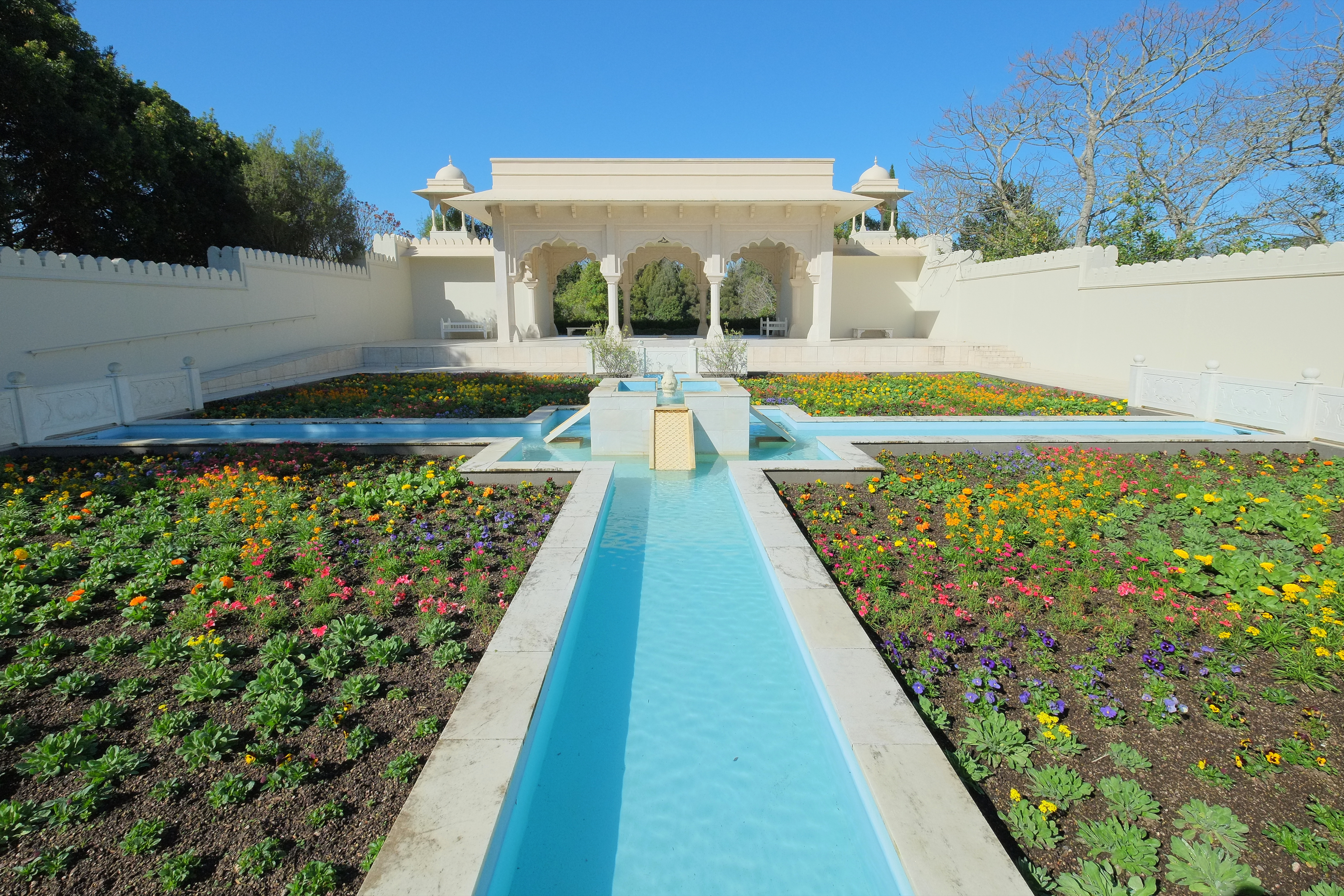
Indian Char Bagh Garden

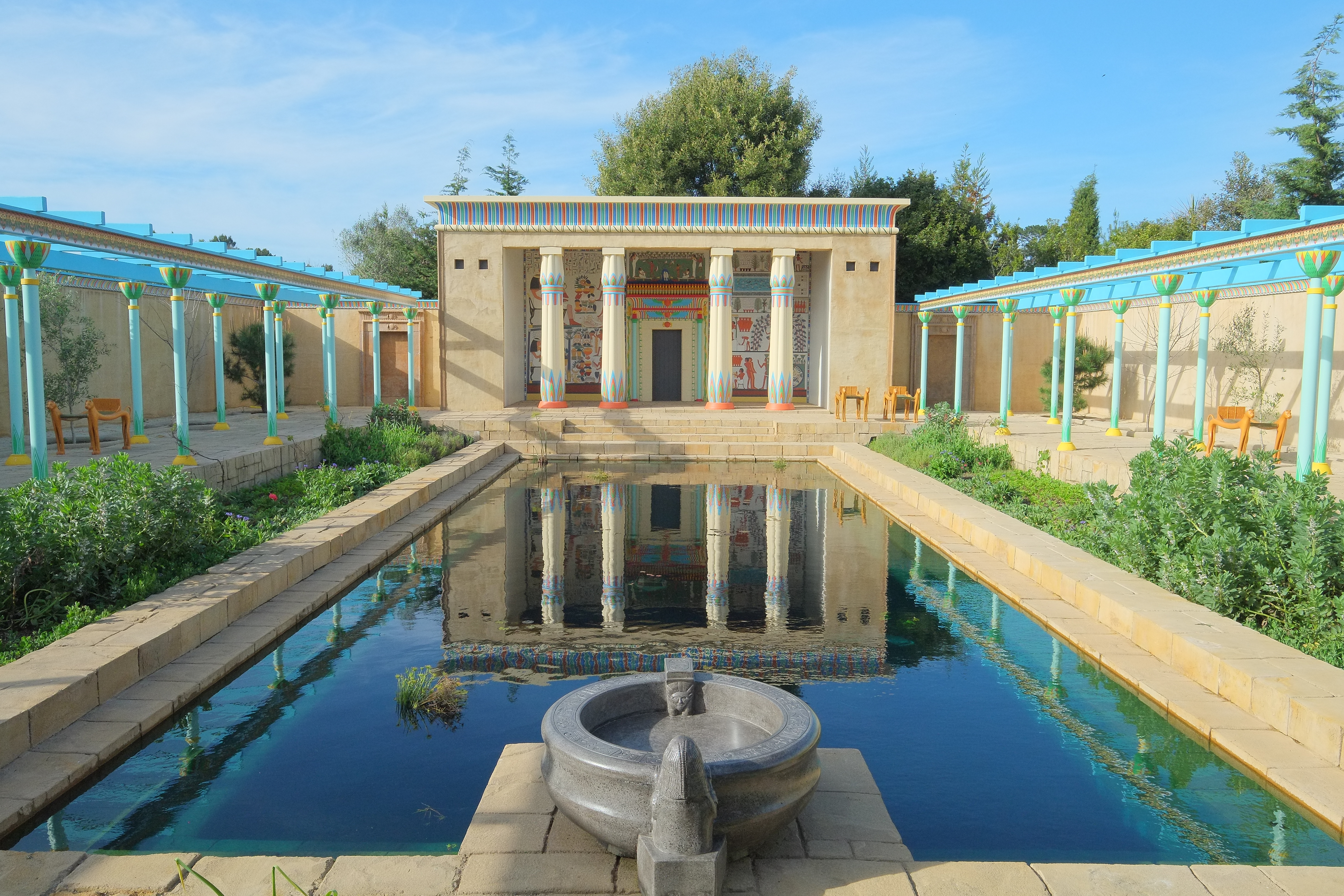
Ancient Egyptian Garden

The Paradise Garden Collection represents how gardeners have tried to create paradise on Earth. The word 'paradise' is derived from the Old Persian word ‘pairidaeza’ which translates to 'enclosed garden'. There are six gardens in this collection.

- The Chinese Scholar's Garden is an interpretation of 10th century to 12th century Sung Dynasty gardens that were designed as natural spaces to spark the imagination. The garden has a tiled entrance way, a winding one way path through a corridor, a cave, over Wisteria Bridge, across an Island of Whispering Birds, past a Hidden Philosopher and through a dense bamboo forest, to the red Ting Pavilion overlooking the Waikato River.
- The Japanese Garden of Contemplation is an example of the 14th century to 16th century garden from the Muromachi period, designed for meditation, study and quiet contemplation. The garden includes carefully laid out stones in the Abbott's Quarters, a traditional pavilion, and a vast restful pond.
- The English Flower Garden is an example of the Arts and Crafts gardens from 19th century England which were used as plant collections and compositions of seasonal plant colours. The garden has walls and hedges creating 'outdoor rooms', seats and fountains, and the main space includes a pavilion, lawn and pond.
- The Modernist Garden is a late 20th century American-style garden designed for outdoor living and inspired by modern art. The garden has a curved pond, yellow outdoor chairs, a raised deck and a large mural of Marilyn Monroe.
- The Italian Renaissance Garden is based on the Renaissance gardens of the 15th century or 16th century which were used to rationalise, control and improve nature and draw on Greek, Roman, Medieval and Islamic traditions. The garden includes a Romulus and Remus statue at the entrance, an upper level under arched trellis work, a lower level with flower beds and pavilion, and an outdoor theatre.
- The Indian Char Bagh Garden is an interpretation of the 16th century and 17th Century symbolic four-quartered Islamic gardens built by the Mughal aristocracy as an escape from harsh dry conditions. The garden consists of geometric flower beds in a range of colours, below a chalk coloured Indian pavilion.
- The Ancient Egyptian Garden, claimed to be the world's first recreation of an Ancient Egyptian garden of ca. 2000 BC, the first decorative gardens ever created, opened in June 2022.

=== Cultivar Garden Collection ===
The Cultivar Garden Collection is the closest Hamilton Gardens comes to being a botanical garden. Gardens in the Cultivar Collection include well-known plants which have been selected and bred for gardens at different times throughout history by collectors, breeders and speculators. There are six current or proposed gardens in this collection.

- The Rogers Rose Garden includes rose collections from different periods in the history and development of modern roses, from species to new hybrids. The garden is one of 62 rose gardens around the world to be recognised with an Award of Garden Excellence by the World Federation of Rose Societies. Since 2001, the New Zealand Rose of the Year Trials and the Pacific Rose Bowl Festival have been held at the Rogers Rose Garden.
- The Rhododendron Lawn features species and cultivars from plant hunting and the development of azalea and rhododendron.
- The Hammond Camellia Garden has a range of Camellia from species to various modern cultivars.
- The Victorian Flower Garden features tender plants selected and grown for tropical colour. The flowers are displayed in beds and glass houses, in accordance with 19th Century Gardenesque tradition.
- The New Zealand Cultivar Garden includes native plants selected and bred for foliage colour.
- The Dutch Renaissance Garden represents a 17th-century Dutch renaissance garden, from the golden age of plant imports and speculation.

=== Productive Garden Collection ===
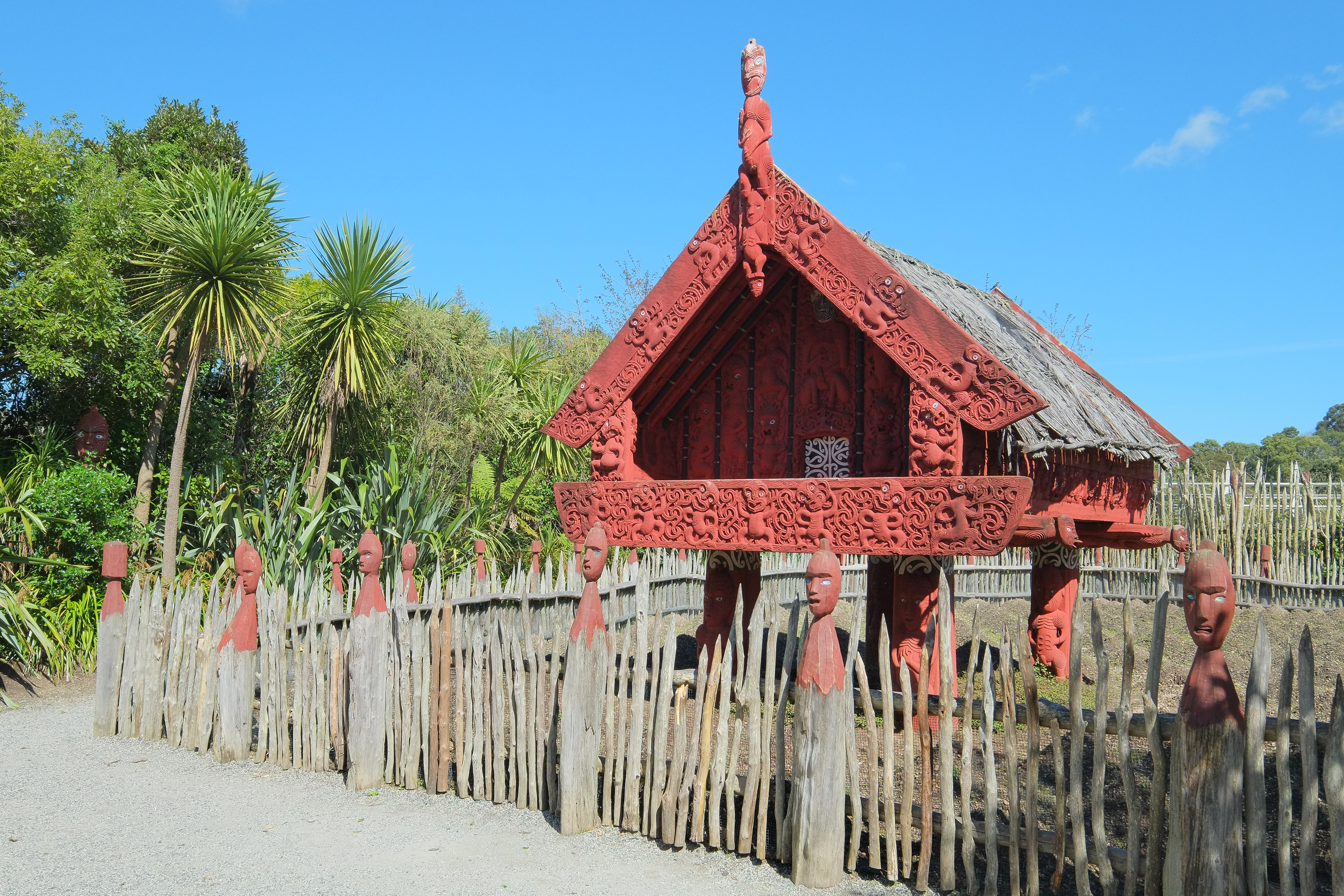
Te Parapara Māori Garden, based on a traditional homeland of Ngāti Wairere.

The Productive Garden Collection demonstrates different ways people relate to and use productive plants. Each garden is supposed to represent the process of gardening, as both a natural phenomenon and a cultural practice. Gardens in this collection include the Herb Garden, the Kitchen Garden, Te Parapara Māori Garden, and the Sustainable Backyard Garden. There are currently four gardens in the collection, and another one is planned.

- The Herb Garden includes plants that are used for food, cosmetics, perfume and medicine.
- The Kitchen Garden includes vegetables and small fruit, is based on traditional 18th century and 19th century European kitchen gardens.
- The Sustainable Backyard is a small enclosed garden in which food is sustainably produced at a small backyard scale.
- Te Parapara is a traditional Māori garden that demonstrates how local Māori grew food in gardens on the banks of the Waikato River before European settlement. It occupies part of the site of a pre-European settlement of the same name. It was the site of fertile gardens and sacred rituals for the harvesting of food crops, and was the home to famous Ngāti Wairere chief Haanui. The garden is part of Hamilton City Council's long-term plan for the development and restoration of the Waikato River.

=== Landscape Garden Collection ===
The Landscape Garden Collection forms the outer spaces of the Hamilton Gardens site, and includes landscape gardens inspired by philosophical traditions. These spaces are supposed to be expressive and subtle artifacts of the relationship between human beings and the natural world.

There are six spaces in this collection:

- The Bussaco Woodland is a forest with isolated viewing spots, similar to those in many 3rd century to 12th century cultures. The woodland includes an outdoor chapel, a statue and river views, and is isolated from the rest of the Hamilton Gardens site.
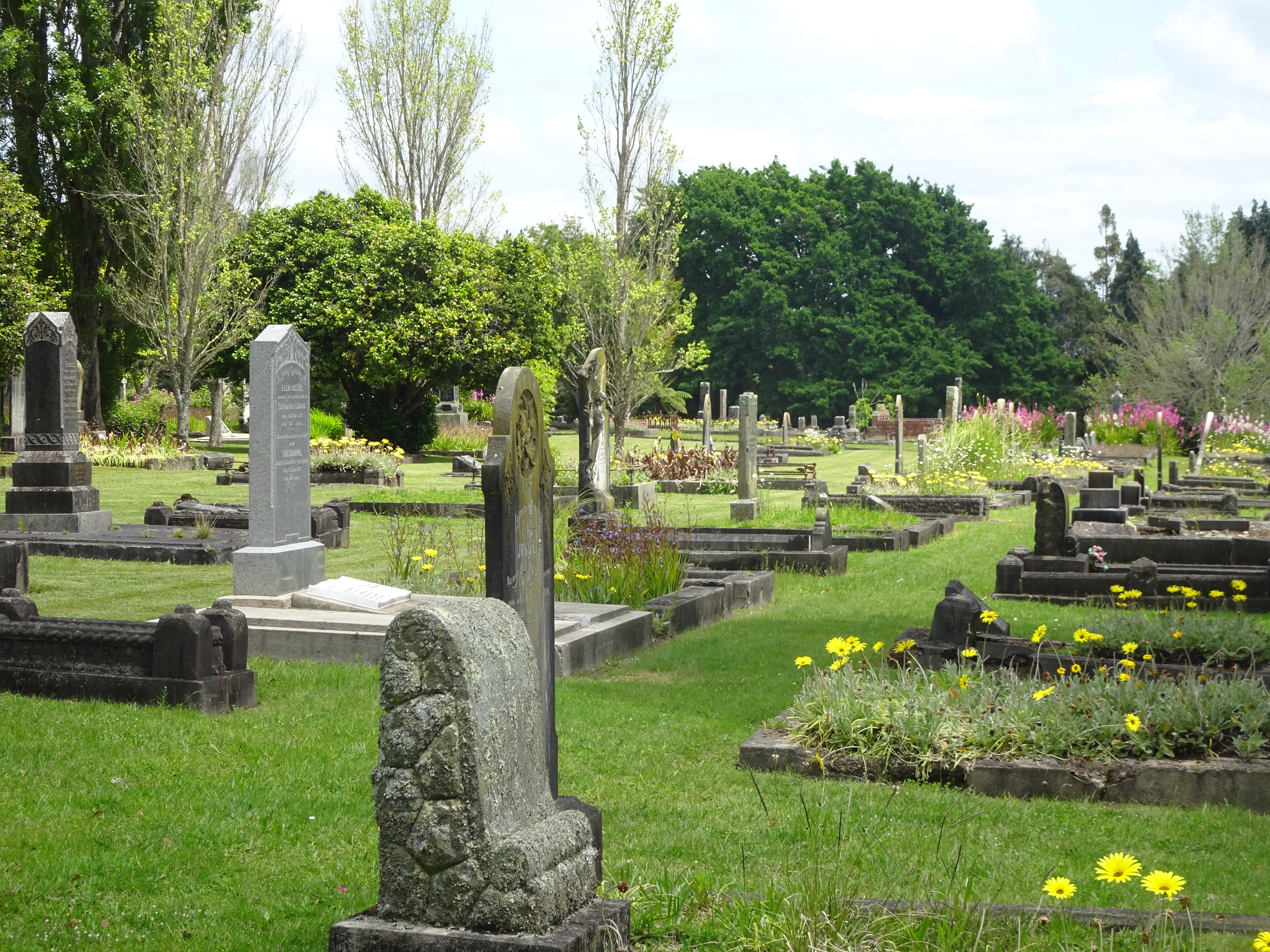
  Hamilton East Cemetery
- The Hamilton East Park Cemetery, opened in 1863, is an example of the late 19th century and early 20th century Rural Park Cemetery movement, which led to the creation of some of the first public parks. The cemetery follows a symmetrical English style influenced by John Loudon, and is the burial grounds of many of the first British settlers of Hamilton.
- The Echo Bank Bush is an area of native bush, maintained in the 20th-century tradition of conservation.
- The Valley Walk is a 20th-century naturalistic landscape garden using native Waikato plants. The plantings have been selected for their appropriateness to the habitat and natural ecosystem, reducing the need for weeding and chemicals, and increasing plant growth and diversity.
- The Hillside Lawn is a vast lawn on top of Hamilton's old city rubbish dump, which typifies how landscapes have been restored after industrial use.
- The Baroque Formal Garden is a proposed take on the classical 17th century to 18th century French gardens which were designed to project the power and wealth of their owner.

=== Fantasy Garden Collection ===
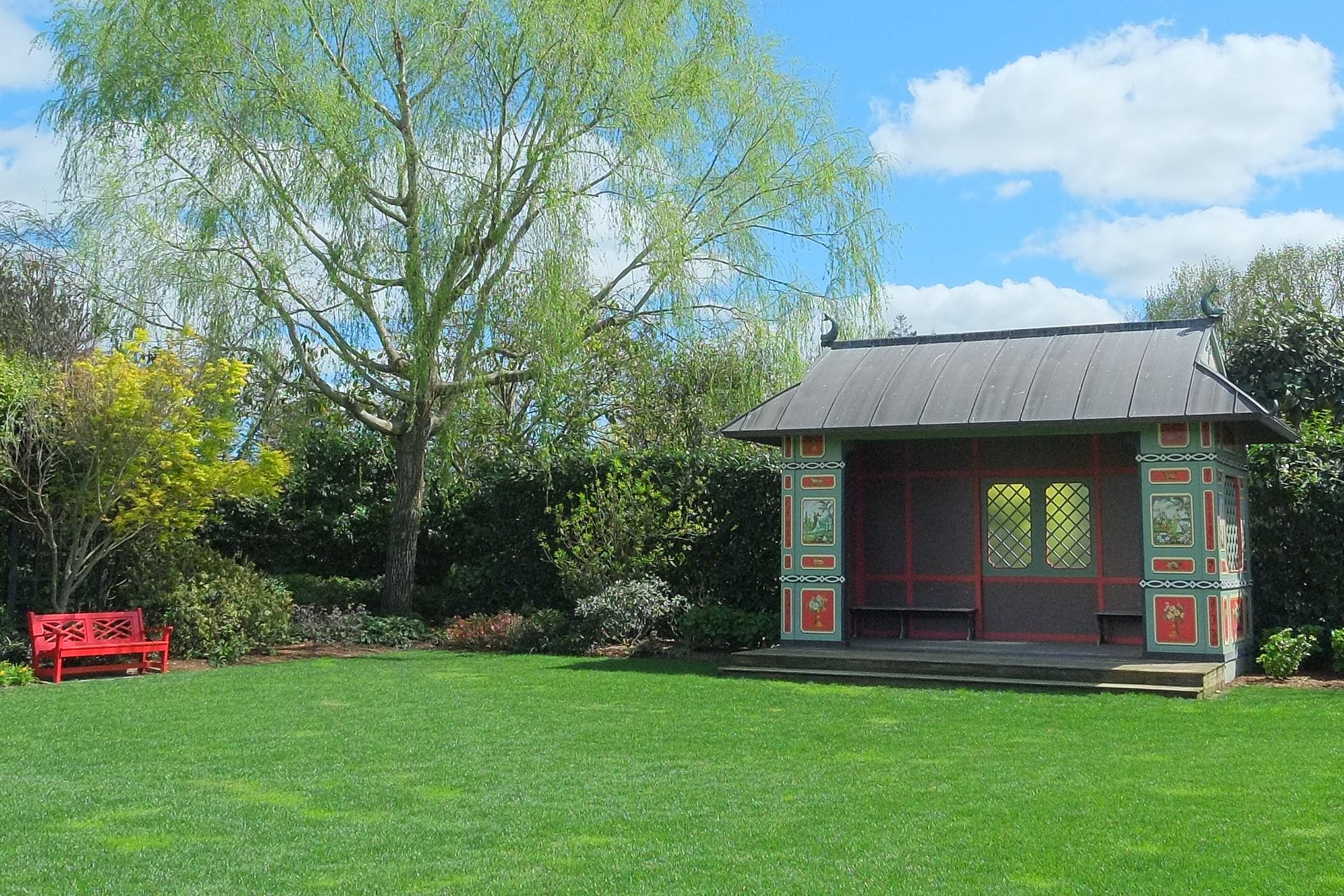
The Chinoiserie Garden Pavilion is based on Chinese House, Stowe.

The Fantasy Garden Collection is supposed to illustrate both how fantasy and imagination has been used in garden design, and how garden design can stimulate fantasy and imagination in people who visit gardens. There are nine current or proposed gardens in this collection.

- The Chinoiserie Garden incorporates elements of Chinoiserie, a European fashion to interpret the Oriental design in the late 18th century and 19th century. The Chinoiserie Pavilion centrepiece is modelled on the Chinese House built in 1738 at Stowe Gardens in the United Kingdom. It is a reinterpretation of Chinese and Japanese designs and European interpretations, and includes The Chinoiserie, a Bottle Gate and Chinoiserie seats.
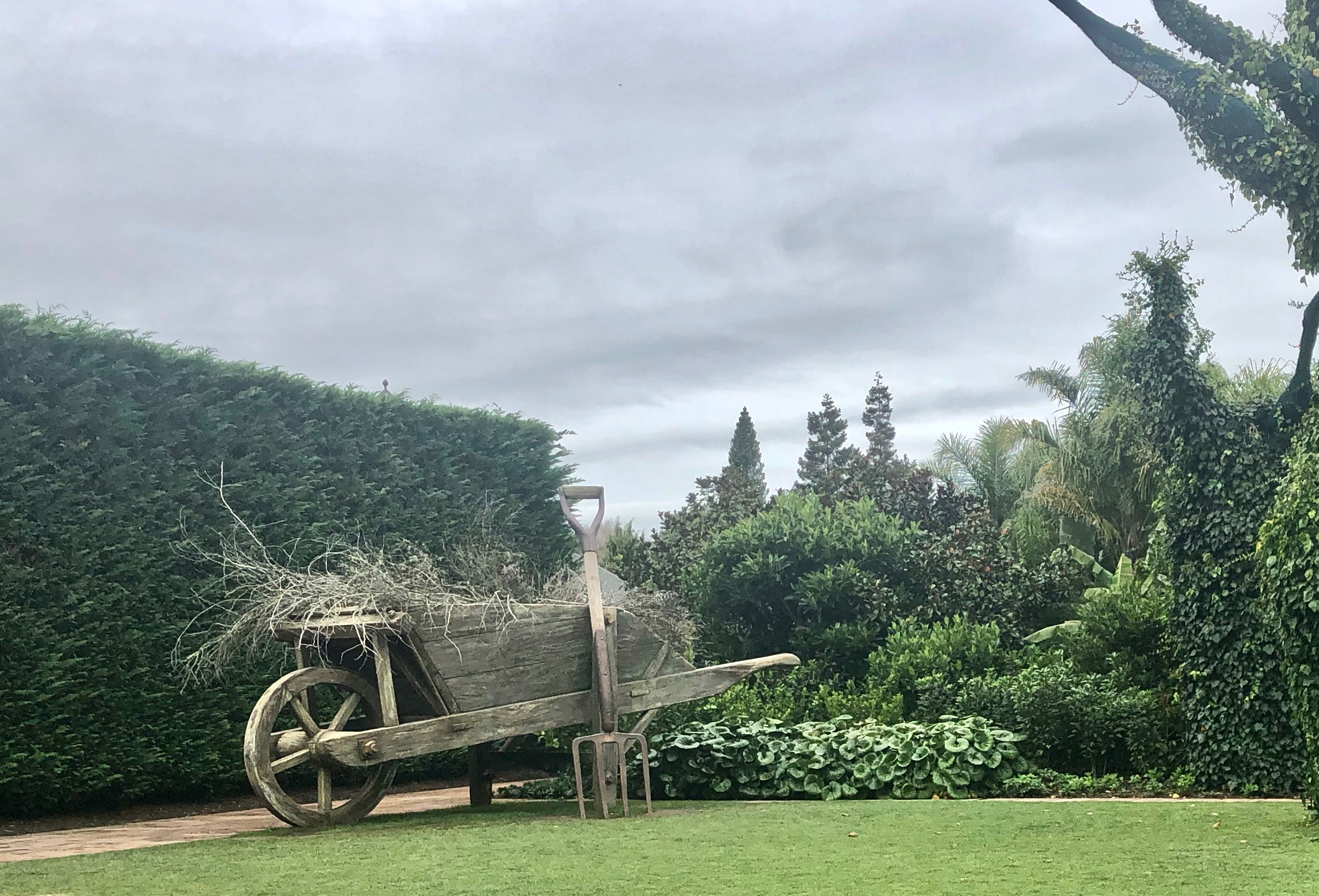
- Surrealist Garden, with moving 'tree' branches and outsize tools and gate.
  The Tropical Garden includes plants from other climatic regions, including tropical-looking plants, which are very hard to grow in the temperate Waikato climate. The garden includes 200 species and more than 8000 individual specimens, including a vertical garden wall with 4000 plant pockets around a pond. Tropical bird calls, used under a Creative Commons license, are played from hidden speakers at random times.
- The Surrealist Garden is a mystery garden aiming to trick the subconscious mind. The garden includes a large lawn with mysterious, surreal giant topiary figures known as "trons", garden furniture that is five times normal size, and oversized flowers that talk were considered. It was planned to open in 2019. The garden opened on 3 February 2020.
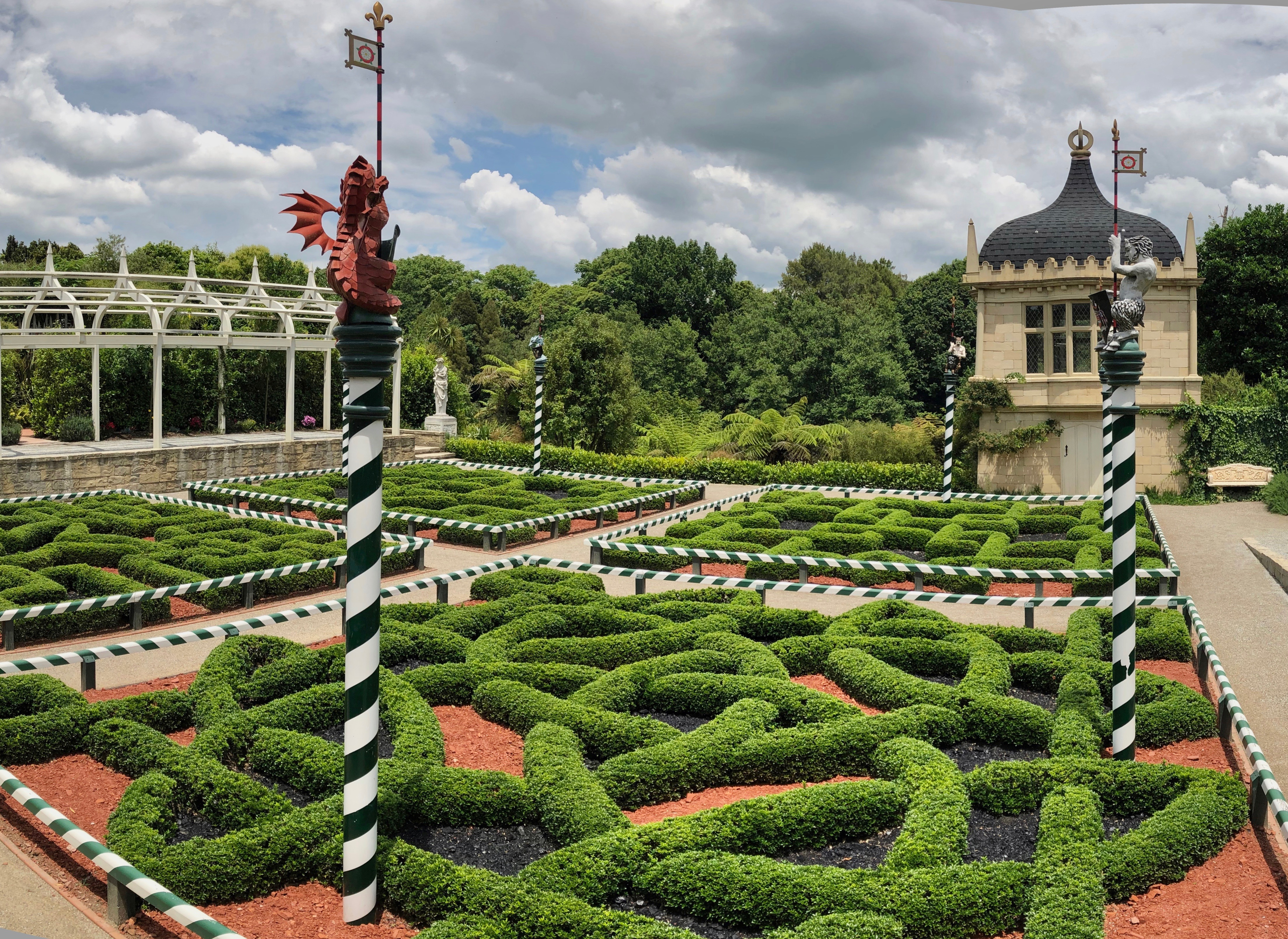
  Tudor Garden.
- The Tudor Garden is an interpretation of a 16th-century English Renaissance garden with red and black stone knot gardens, Elizabethan walls, and a stone pavilion. The garden design is based on the drawings of the sixteenth-century writer Didymus Mountain and reflects aristocrats' fascination with geometric patterns and symbols. The signature features of the garden are sponsored sculptures of Phoenix, Unicorn, Griffin, Dragon, Satyr, Centaur, Sea serpent and Bottom. It opened in 2015.
- The Concept Garden is a 21st-century garden to represent a single idea, following the conventions of conceptual art. It is estimated to cost $250,000. and make a cryptic reference to the Māori proverb, "He peke tangata, apa he peke titoki," which translates as "the human family lives on, while the branch of a titoki falls and decays". It opened in 2018.
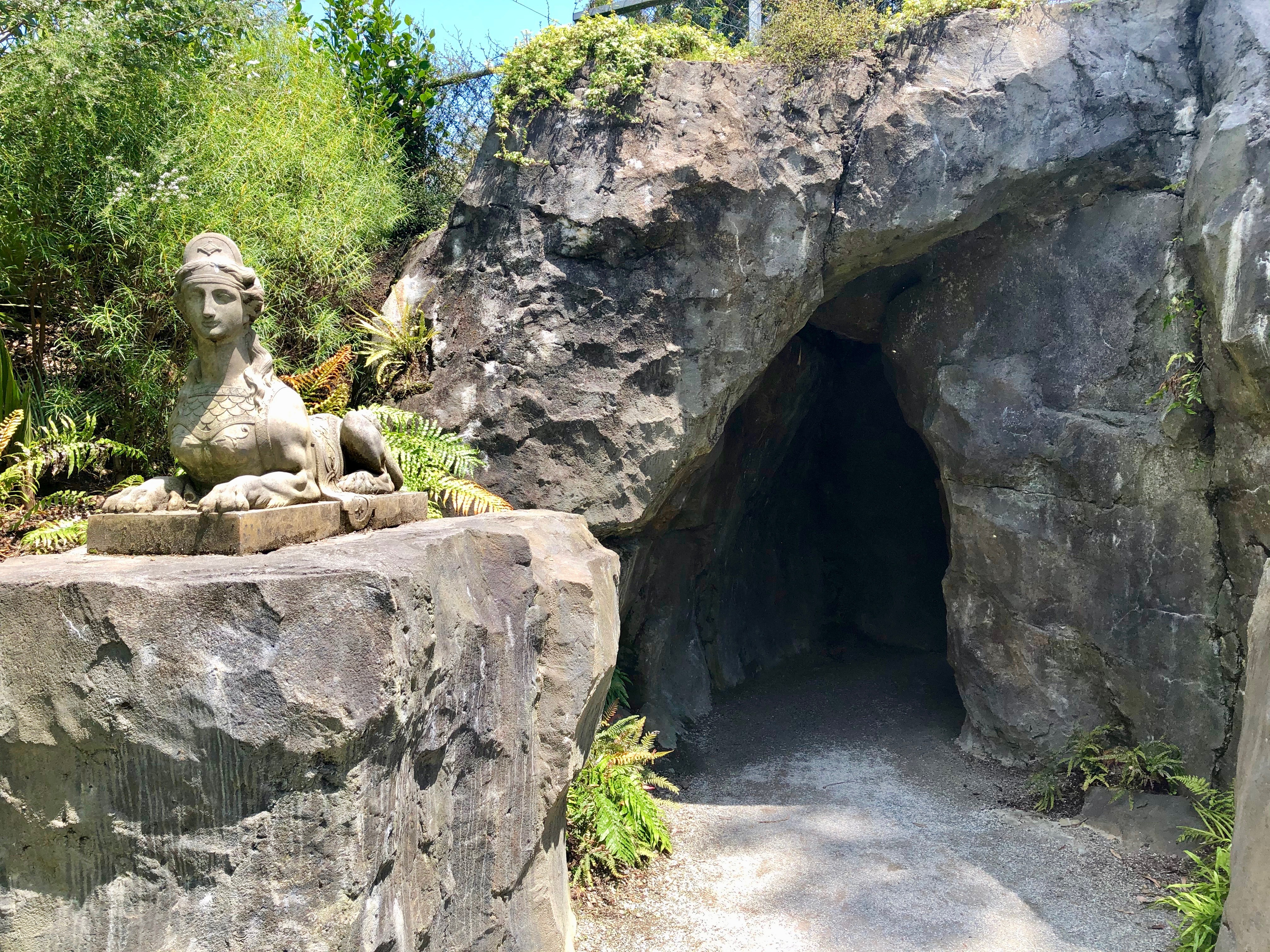
- Entrance to the Picturesque Garden is through a short tunnel
  The Picturesque Garden is wild landscape, with artificial historic features representing 18th century Romantic period garden traditions, and was estimated to cost $600,000, but the total was about $900,000. It borders the Waikato River, and features river views. It opened on 4 November 2019.
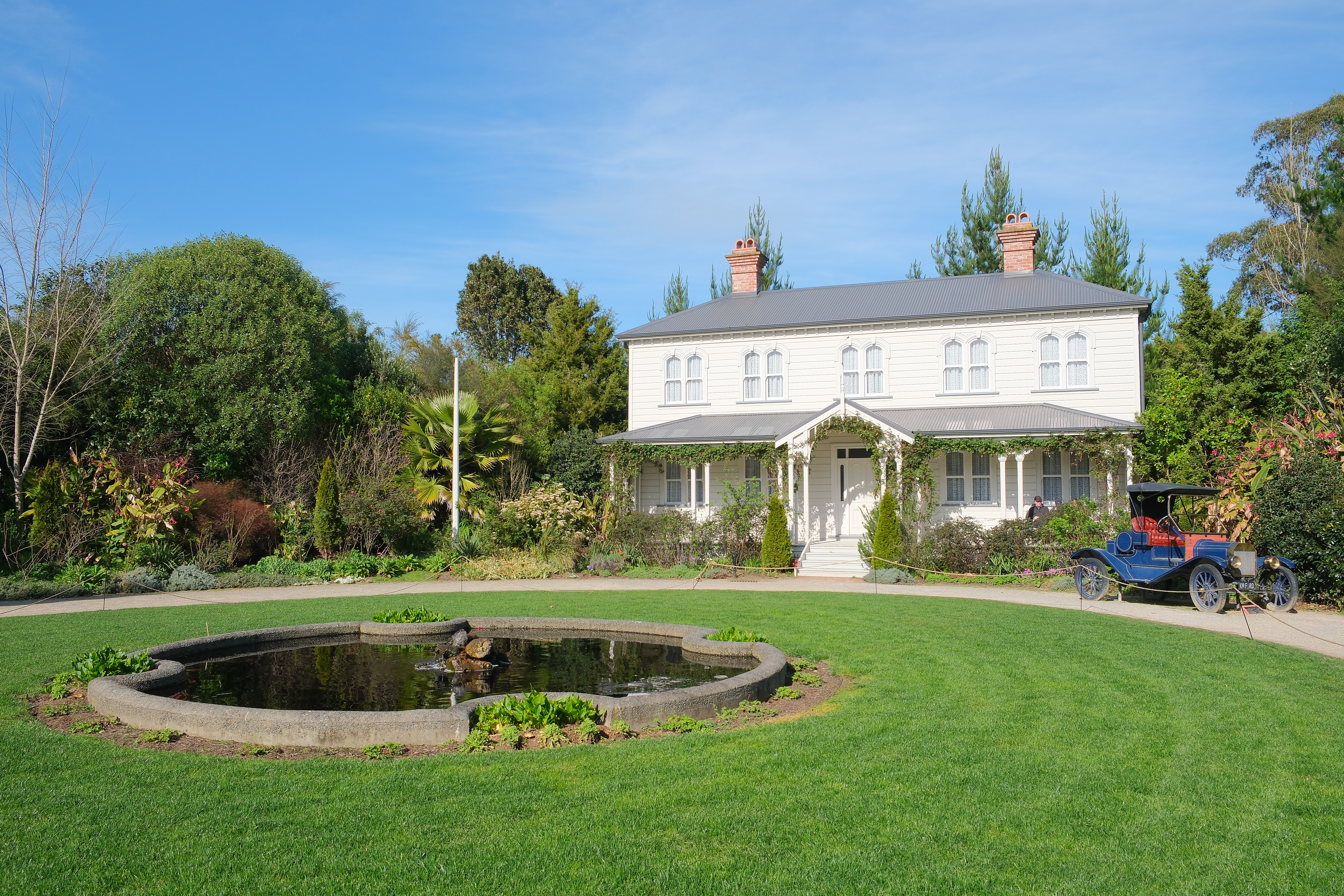
  Katherine Mansfield Garden
- The Mansfield Garden is an $800,000 recreation of the early 20th century New Zealand lawn party featured in Katherine Mansfield's short story The Garden Party. The garden includes a tent on the tennis court, a karaka hedge, a lily pond, long tables with white tablecloths, and the frontage of a 19th-century villa. It was planned to open in October 2018, but opened on 12 November.
- The proposed Medieval Garden, an example of a 13th-century European courtyard garden, would be based on the poem Roman de la Rose, and would cost $650,000.
- The proposed Rococo Theatre Garden is an 18th-century and 19th century German or Austrian Rococo-Baroque garden costing $900,000. Such a garden would have been a theatrical setting for classical music performances and would have followed in the same traditions as the music of the time.

== Visitors ==
Visitors to the Gardens come from around the world, including Australia, the United Kingdom, Europe, Asia, North America and South America. Local visitors include people from Auckland, the Waikato region, the Bay of Plenty and Taranaki. 1,148,613 visitors are thought to have visited in the year to July 2017, up 13.5% on the previous year.

The Hamilton Gardens website features an interactive map developed to help users see a digital version of the map to help visitors find gardens of interest.

== Events and facilities ==
=== Events ===
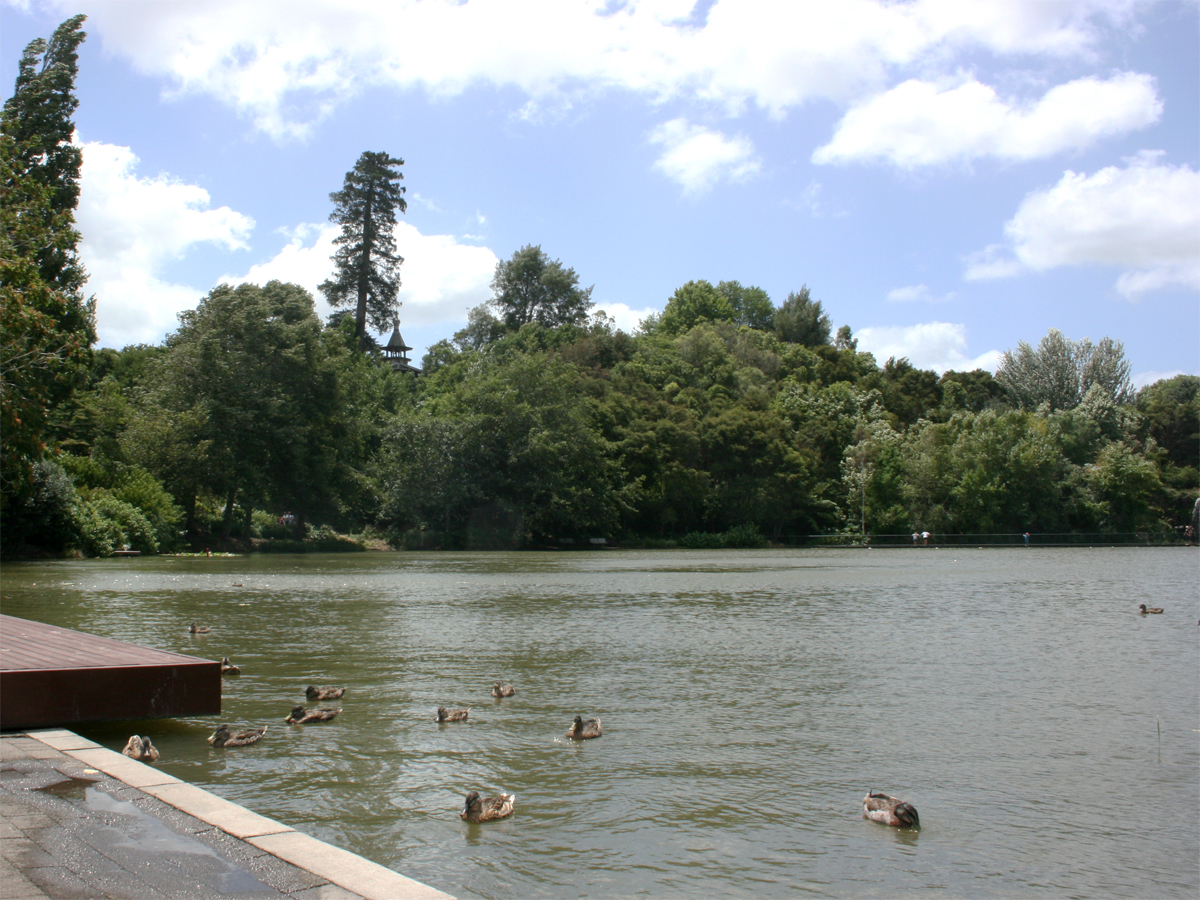
Turtle Lake and nearby Hamilton Gardens Pavilion are used to host many events.

The Hamilton Gardens Arts Festival has been held each February since 1998. The festival includes a range of events in different gardens and buildings, including concerts, exhibitions and a pop-up bar.

The gardens play host to many events, including the signature Pacific Rose Bowl Festival in November, the National Painting and Printmaking Awards in February, the Great Pumpkin Carnival in March, the Hamilton Fringe Festival in late March, and Stations of the Cross before Easter.

The gardens host annual gardening events specialising in bonsai, chrysanthemums, daffodils, dahlias, lilies, orchids, tulips and roses. Other annual shows include the Doll and Teddy Bear Show, the Salvation Army Christmas Concert, the Scarecrow Festival, the Waikato Maths Competition and the Waikato Science Fair.

The Hamilton Gardens Pavilion is the venue for concerts, antique fairs, collectable shows, and model railway exhibitions. It is used for one-off business breakfasts, psychic nights, and health seminars. It is also the location of regular fitness expos, wedding expos, natural health expos, and trade shows.

Local communities use the Hamilton Gardens for religious ceremonies, cultural gatherings, and balls.

The gardens also play host to Anzac Day commemorations, model boat regattas, karate competitions, pipe band competitions, and fun runs.

All the gardens and buildings are available for weddings and ceremonies, and the Hamilton Gardens provides an experienced wedding coordinator to make arrangements and provide assistance. There is a fee to book enclosed gardens for weddings, but no charge for taking wedding photos inside the gardens site.

=== Amenities and facilities ===
At the centre of the gardens is the Hamilton Gardens Pavilion, a convention and corporate function centre which can seat 650 people across three rooms. The pavilion also houses the Hamilton Gardens Information Centre, which is run by paid staff and volunteers and offers seasonal plants, tourism bookings and souvenirs.

A focal point of Hamilton Gardens is Turtle Lake, an artificial lake and duck habitat with a stage on one side and a walkway running above the water on the other. The four-metre horsetail waterfall flowing into the lake is the only waterfall in Hamilton. An independently owned cafe, restaurant and catering company operates at the lake, serving a variety of coffees, snacks, meals and ice creams. The cafe's al fresco dining area looks out on the lake.

Toilets are located in the Hamilton Gardens Pavilion and at the Gate 1 entrance. Seating is located around the site, with most gardens having sheltered spots in case of rain. Most gardens are accessible for wheelchairs, mobility scooters and pushchairs. There are maps, apps, brochures and guided tours in different languages, and an activity sheet for children. There are picnic spots near the Waikato River, Turtle Lake and in some gardens. Dogs are banned from enclosed areas, but there is an off-leash dog walking area east of the Turtle Lake car park.

==== Jetty and cruises ====
The old jetty below the Gate 1 car park was one of 10 jetties on the Waikato in Hamilton. As it was in a poor repair, a new facility, built by Total Marine services of Auckland was opened in June 2018 and is served by cruises from Memorial Park and Swarbrick Landing, which started in 2012.
