= Penfold (surname) =

Penfold, sometimes spelt Pinfold, is an English-language surname. The name Penfold can be found in written records dating back to the reign of Alfred the Great. In Middle English, a pinfold was a pound or an open enclosure for stray (or improperly supervised) domesticated animals.

Notable people with the surname Penfold include:

- Adrian Penfold (born 1952), British planning expert
- Alexander Penfold (1901–1982), English cricketer
- Alison Penfold, Australian politician
- Bernard Penfold (1916–2015), British Army officer
- Christopher Penfold, British writer and producer in radio and television
- Christopher Rawson Penfold (1811–1870), Viticulturist and entrepreneur of South Australia's wine industry
- David Penfold (born 1964), field hockey player from New Zealand
- Frank C. Penfold (1849–1921), American artist and teacher
- George Saxby Penfold DD (1770–1846), a Church of England clergyman
- Hilary Penfold (born 1953), Australian parliamentary counsel and judge
- John Penfold (1828–1909), British surveyor and architect
- John Penfold (priest) (1864–1922), British Anglican priest
- Liz Penfold (born 1947), Australian politician
- Mary Penfold (1820–1895), Viticulturist and entrepreneur of South Australia's wine industry
- Mark Penfold (born 1956), English professional footballer
- Merimeri Penfold (1920–2014), New Zealand Māori educator
- Molly Penfold (born 2001), New Zealand cricketer
- Morgan Penfold (born 1998), English footballer
- Paula Penfold, New Zealand investigative journalist
- Peter Penfold (1944–2023), British diplomat
- Robert Penfold (born 1951), Foreign Correspondent for Australia's Nine News
- William Penfold, early settler and founder of the village of Penfield, South Australia

Notable people with the surname Pinfold include:

- Allan Pinfold (1929–2019), ring name of Australian professional wrestler Johnny Gilday
- Andrew Pinfold (born 1978), Canadian road cyclist
- Elizabeth Pinfold (1859–1927), New Zealand activist for the Belgian Relief Fund (Commission for Relief in Belgium) in WWI
- Francis Dewsbury Pinfold (1892–1976), New Zealand doctor and politician
- Graeme Pinfold (1936–1986), Australian rules footballer
- James Pinfold (born 1950), English-Canadian physicist
