= Isaac Coates =

Mayor of Hamilton from 1888 to 1892

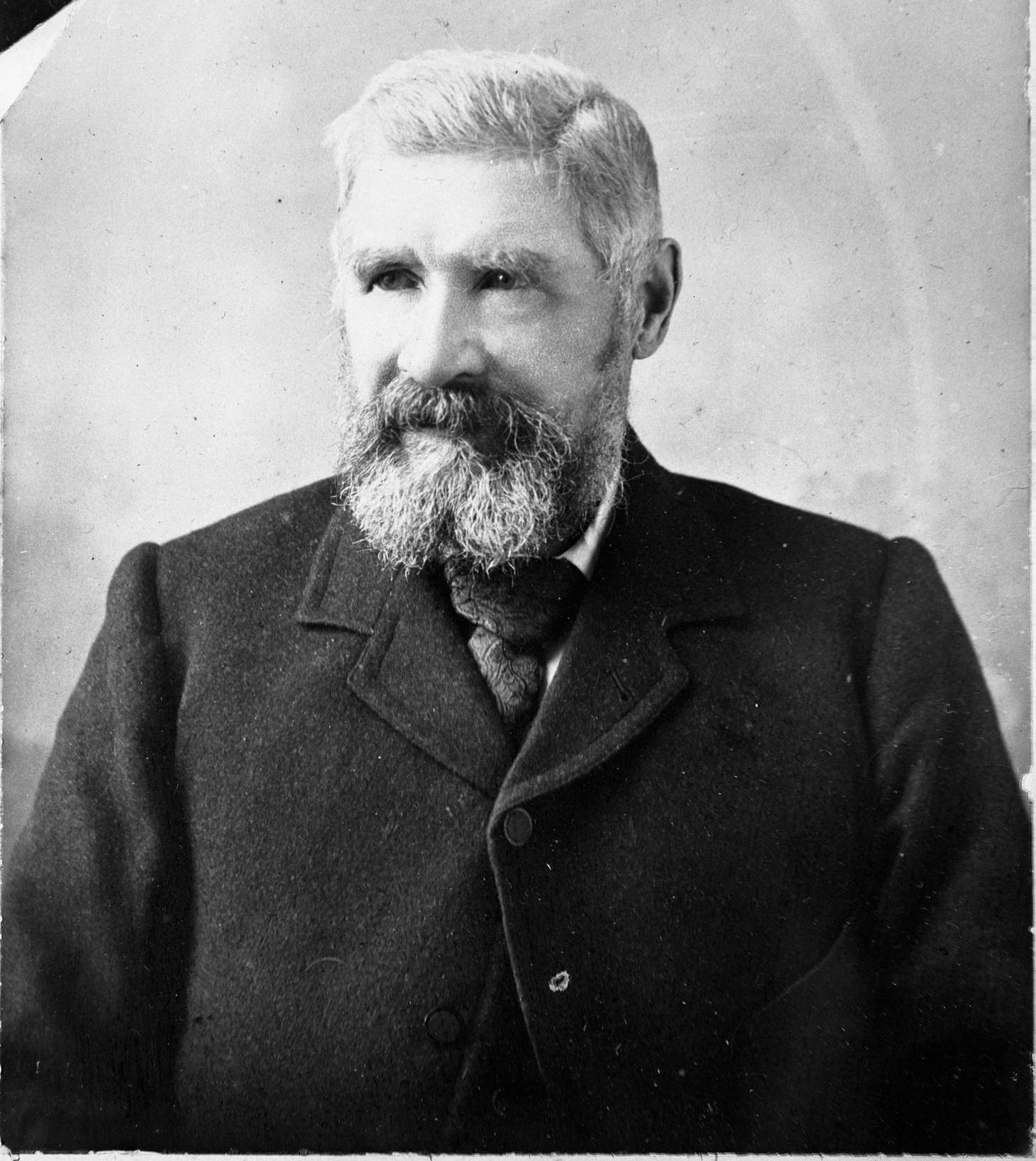
- Isaac Coates in 1901

9th Mayor of Hamilton
- In office 1888–1893
- Preceded by: Charles Barton
- Succeeded by: John Parr

Personal details
- Born: 7 April 1840 Richmond
- Died: 1 May 1932 (aged 92) Hamilton, New Zealand
- Spouse: Alice Coleman (m. 1874)

Isaac Coates (1840–1932) was mayor of Hamilton, New Zealand, from 1888 to 1892, a farmer, flax-miller, and a drainage and railway contractor.

He was born on 7 April 1840, to Samuel Coates. a tenant farmer at Gayles, near Richmond, who died in 1863. His younger brother took on their farm, when Isaac chose to emigrate to New Zealand in 1867. His sister and brother-in-law, Thomas Dinsdale, after whom Dinsdale is named, came to work for Isaac in 1869, working on flax cutting at one stage.

Isaac Coates was a relatively common name. Thus a 1942 Waikato Times obituary for Jane Meadway asserted that she was a daughter of Isaac Coates, "one of the best-known of the early settlers in the Waikato", though she was born at Akaroa in 1862, five years before the future mayor emigrated. Possibly she was related to Isaac Coates, an artist, who was living in Nelson in the 1840s. Another Isaac Coates was a US Army Surgeon in the 1860s.

== Emigration ==
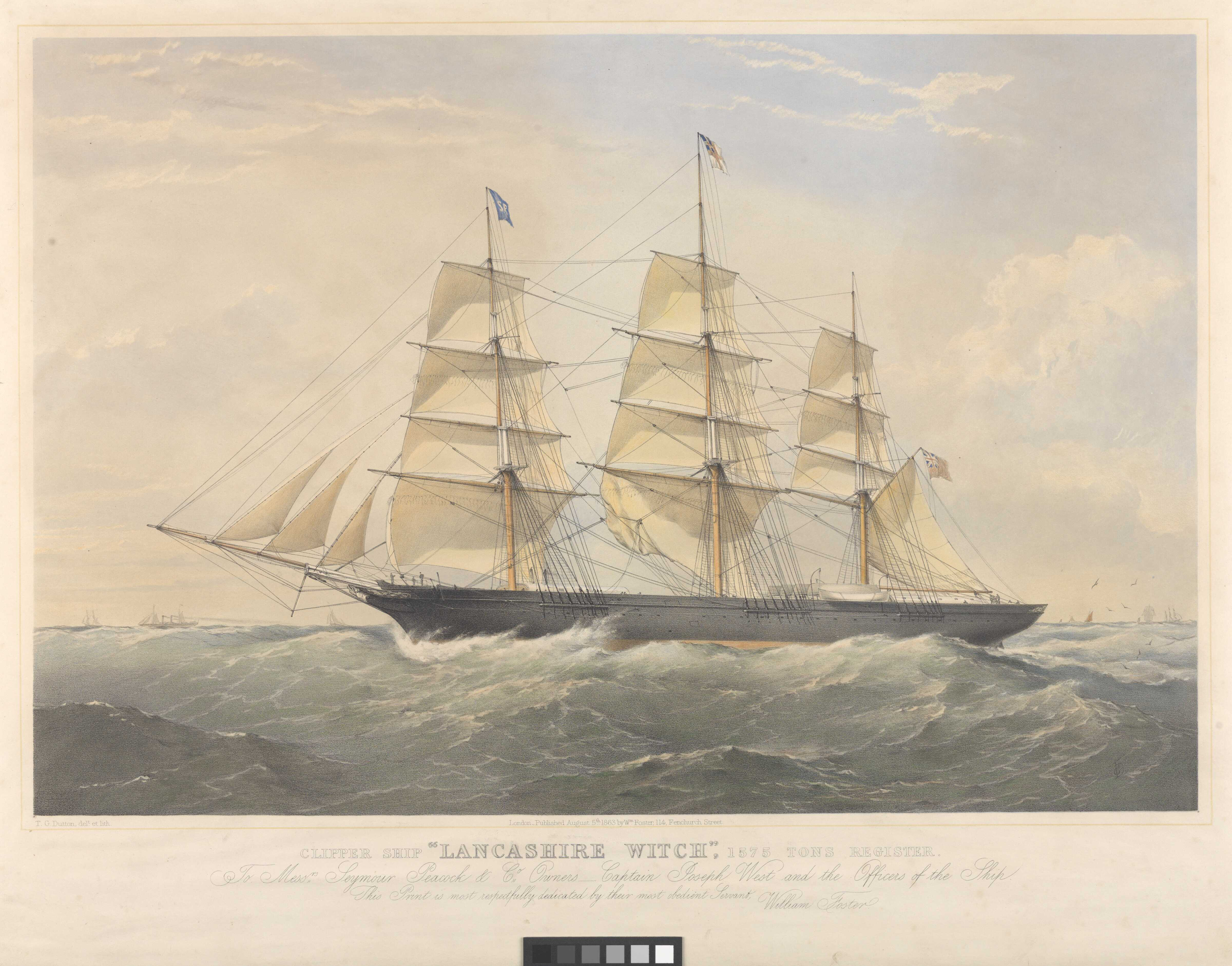
Clipper Ship Lancashire Witch, painted in 1863

Isaac arrived at Lyttelton, on the Quebec-built clipper ship, Lancashire Witch, which had been carrying emigrants from England since 1856. Isaac's recollection of the voyage was that he arrived on 21 July 1867, paid £30 for a second class berth, was seasick, short of water and that the food was "almost uneatable". A report by the Immigration Commissioners confirmed problems with water and flour. There was also a fight on board. However, other second class passengers (there were 12, none of them named, and many government assisted migrants) wrote to thank the captain for their voyage and the captain reported that they left East India Docks on 2 April 1867 and anchored at Lyttelton on 29 July. Their first sighting of land was the Snares Islands / Tini Heke on 24 July. The immigrants reached Christchurch on 30 July.

Isaac had a letter of introduction from a brother of his local MP, Sir F. Milbank, to Joseph Tetley, of Marlborough. He walked north up the coast from Christchurch to Tetley's sheep station, taking several days and fording, or taking a ferry across, several rivers. He left the Tetleys, but continued working on stations, doing a variety of jobs, including rick building and wool handling with Merino sheep.

In 1868 he rode to Riccarton, took a coach to Christchurch, sailed to Wellington and took the steamer Taranaki to Auckland, arriving on 13 March. He took a short trip to Thames to look at the goldfield and spent about a year prospecting for gold at Kennedy Bay, where he worked with fellow Yorkshireman, Frederick Atkinson. They panned some gold, but gave up when their dam was washed away. He also met up with other Yorkshiremen.

== Businesses ==
Isaac got another letter of introduction, this time to Captain William Steele, whom he later described as 'Father of Hamilton'. Isaac took a coach to Mercer, a steamer from there to Ngāruawāhia and then walked to Hamilton, where he met Captain Steele and looked at several farms.

He bought 400 acres (160 ha), at Ruakura, including 200 acres (81 ha) each from Dr Beale (£200) and Ensign John Crawford (under £300, including a house), the latter being first of the troops to land at Hamilton during the Invasion of the Waikato. Isaac later extended the farm to 700 acres (280 ha) and had drains dug to convert the wetland to farmland. Isaac was one of the first Waikato farmers to mechanise, getting a steam thresher in 1874 and also mowing, reaping, binding, and chaff-cutting machines. After being refused a mortgage in 1895, he sold the farm in about 1901, when flax prices were low. It was then sold to the Government to create what later became Ruakura Agriculture Research Centre.

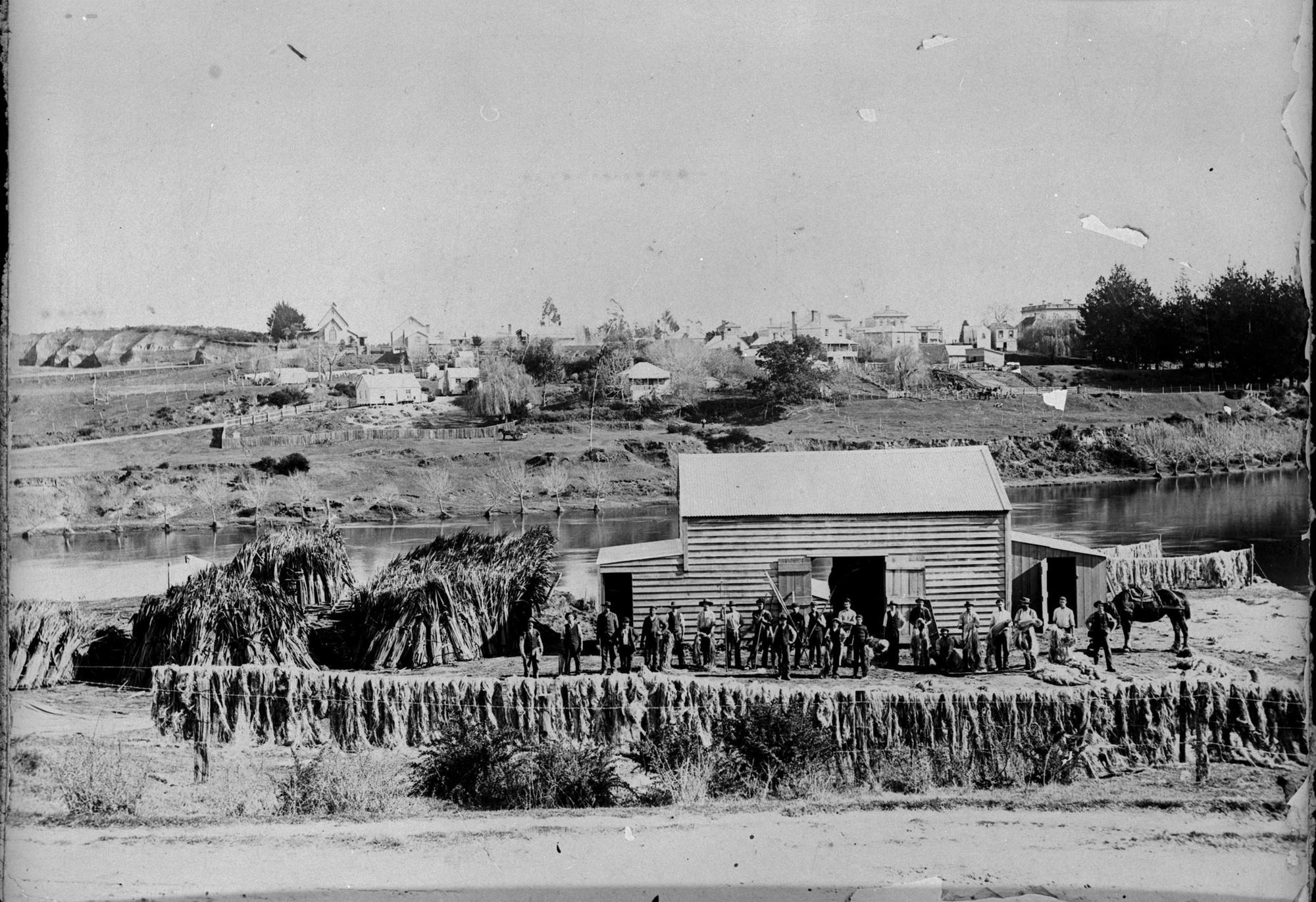
Isaac Coates' flax mill in 1898

In 1875 Isaac had a contract to build a road into the Piako swamp. In 1878 and 1879 he and Angus Campbell were in partnership as timber merchants. From 1878 to 1880 he was also trading in Hamilton East as Small & Coates, grocers and agricultural merchants. In 1880 he sold his own crops and then started on his own account as an agricultural merchant. In 1878 and 1881 he had contracts for swamp drainage. He and civil engineer, Henry Hulbert Metcalfe, also had a flax mill, at least from 1886 to 1905, where the Memorial Park now is, and others at Morrinsville and Maketu.

Isaac and Henry won the contract to build the Te Awamutu to Ōtorohanga section of the North Island Main Trunk Railway and in 1886 they won the contract to extend it to Te Kūiti. They also worked together building Palmerston North waterworks, in 1889, which they extended in 1891. However, their tenders were too high to get the 1887 Ohinemuri contract for the Hikutaia to Paeroa section of the Thames Branch, the 1890 Helensville to Makarau contract for the North Auckland Line, or the 1893 contract for the Rotorua Branch.

Isaac had a Hamilton cottage burn down in 1903, the year he started a brickworks in Collingwood Street. He moved the brickworks to Huntly in 1905. It was still running in 1908, but seems to have been sold to a newly formed company that year. Coates Street in Hamilton East was built by Isaac in 1908, and some buildings had been erected by 1910. He was also a director of Hamilton Flour Mill, was in the gum trade.

== Public life ==
His first recorded interest in Hamilton politics seems to have been in 1870, when he was on a list of supporters of Waikato MP, Captain Macpherson. Isaac's first election was as a lieutenant in the Waikato Rifle Volunteers in 1871. He was elected as a trustee of Hamilton East Highway District in 1874 and became its secretary. He was elected to the Hamilton parish vestry committee, when it was formed, in 1876 and to the newly formed borough of Hamilton on 7 February 1878. In 1877 he was elected to Kirikiriroa Road Board, was chairman of it in 1893 and resigned from it in 1897. He was elected to the Hamilton East School Committee in 1878.

Isaac nominated his mayoral predecessors, William Australia Graham and Charles Barton. Isaac was mayor from 1888 to 1892. In 1891 he was elected unopposed, but did not stand for mayor in 1892. He was also on Waikato County Council, from which he resigned in 1894, the Hospital and Charitable Aid Board, the Waikato Licensing Committee from 1894 for 13 years, was one of the original members and became president of the Waikato Agricultural and Pastoral Association in 1902 and chairman of South Auckland Racing Club for nearly 20 years. In 1893 he lost a Waikato Parliamentary election on a platform of opposing graduated tax and cooperative contracts, by 76 votes to Liberal MP, Alfred Cadman. In 1905 he was elected back to Hamilton Borough Council, until replaced in 1907.

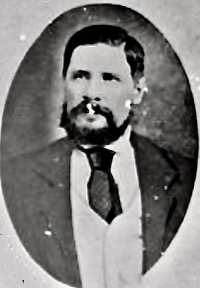
Isaac Coates in 1878

== Family ==
On 18 April 1874 he married Alice Coleman, a daughter of Peter Coleman. Their children were -

- a son born on 8 July 1876
- Margaret Gillett, eldest daughter, born on 28 May 1878, married in 1905 to John Arkle Gillett, of Epsom
- Alberta Ethel Kensington, 2nd daughter, married in 1904 to Norman Charles Kensington, of Dunedin She was living at Taumarunui in 1917
- Lilian Heddon, 3rd daughter, married in 1912 to Robert Heddon of Te Akatea and later living on a farm at Pukeatua
- Ethel Hughes, of Papakura
- Ernest Coates, surveyor, who died of fever in North Borneo in 1921
- H. Arthur Coates, who ran the Morrinsville flax mill, Hamilton brickworks and then moved to Thames and then Rotorua
- Alfred Hamilton Coates, who moved to Melbourne about 1908
- Harold F. Coates, an architect, who moved to Melbourne in 1914
- Violet, who died when she was pushed out of a window, when aged 6 in 1897.

Isaac returned to England in 1872. The family also visited England and Scotland in 1904, 1912 and 1915.

In 1873 he bought a riverside section for £10. Until selling the house in about 1912 to Henry Greenslade, who built Greenslade House, Isaac Coates, lived at 'Wairere', 1 Wellington Street, Hamilton East. He had moved there when he married in 1874, and sold it when its kahikatea timbers were suffering from borer. In 1922 he moved to live with his son, Harold, in Canterbury, Melbourne, but returned in 1924 and was at 9 Wellington Street in 1927 and 1928.

Isaac died on Sunday 1 May 1932. His wife, died a week before him. They were then living with their eldest daughter at Pukenui Rd, Epsom and were buried at Hillsborough Cemetery.
