= Penfold =

Penfold may refer to:

- Penfold (pillar box), a type of pillar box designed by John Penfold

== People ==
- Penfold (surname)

== Other ==
- Ernest Penfold, a character from Danger Mouse (1981)
- Penfolds, Australian wine label
  - Penfolds Grange, Australian wine produced by that label
- Penfold Golf, British manufacturer of golf balls
- Penfold Park (also called Penfold Garden), public park in Sha Tin, Hong Kong
- Penfold PGA Championship, annual professional golf tournament
- Penfold Tournament, former professional golf tournament (1932–1974)
