= Robert William Dyer =

New Zealand solicitor, judge, and mayor (1859–1939)

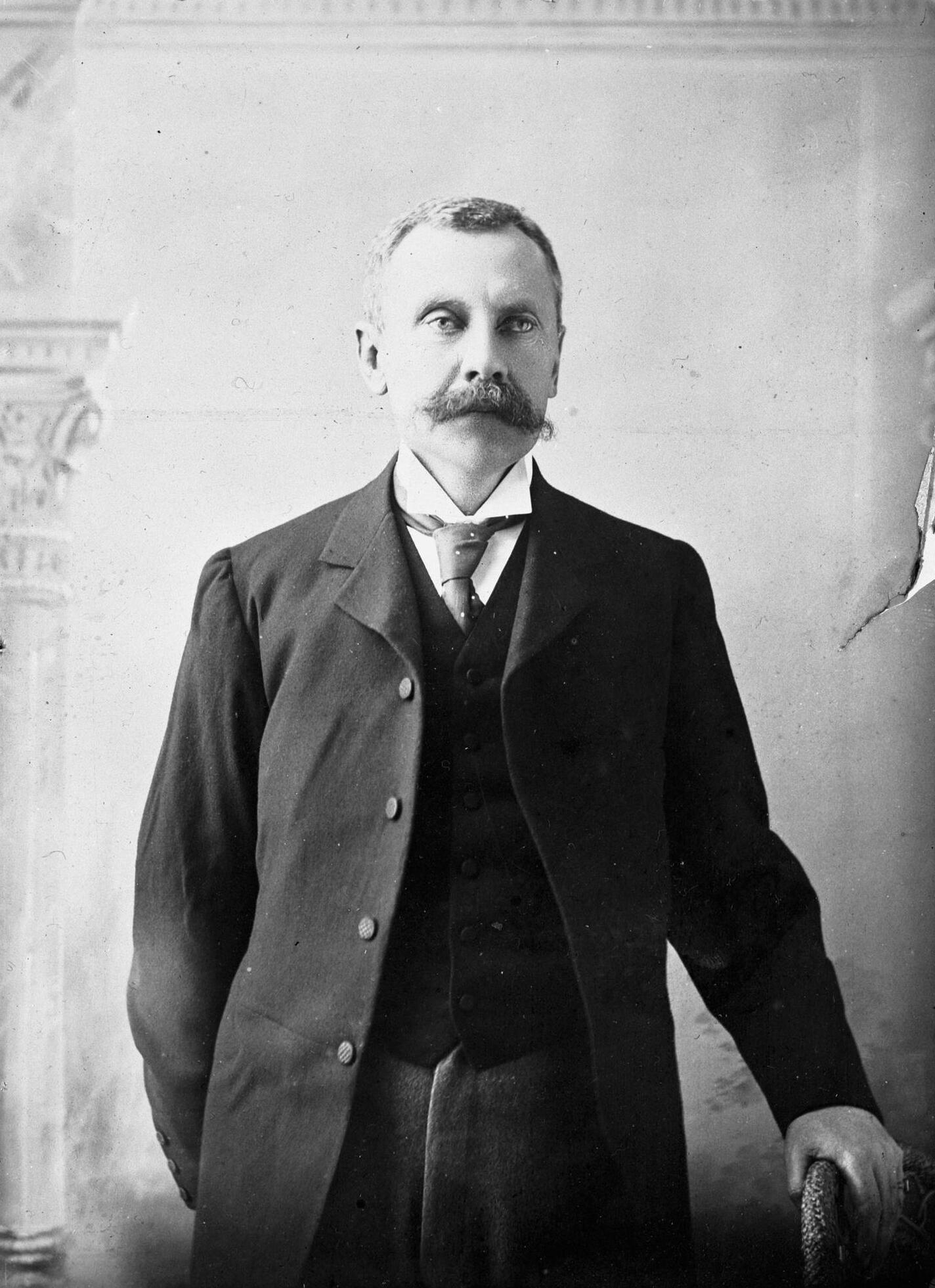
- Robert William Dyer in 1901

14th Mayor of Hamilton
- In office May 1901 – May 1903
- Preceded by: George Edgecumbe
- Succeeded by: Charles Barton

Personal details
- Born: 1859 Mahurangi
- Died: 3 August 1939 (age 79-80) Napier
- Spouse: Elizabeth Augusta Minnitt (m. 1885)
- Occupation: solicitor

Robert William Dyer (1859-1939) was a solicitor, judge and the mayor of Hamilton, New Zealand from 1901 to 1903.

== Professional life ==
Robert was articled to E. A. Mackechnie, a leading Auckland solicitor, and admitted as a solicitor of the Supreme Court at the unusually early age of age of 21 in 1881. He became a leading Auckland solicitor before moving to the Waikato, to enter into partnership with Sir Frederick Whitaker, of Hamilton, managing the Kihikihi and then the Cambridge branch of the business, before moving to Hamilton in 1889, when Sir Frederick's health was failing. He became registrar of deeds in Invercargill in 1903, then in 1905, a stipendiary magistrate in Auckland, then Rotorua and, about 1918, in Hawke's Bay. After nine years he retired to Napier.

As stipendiary magistrate at Whakatāne, he gave evidence in the lengthy case against Rua Kenana Hepetipa in 1916.

== Personal life ==
Robert was born in Mahurangi, the son of Robert Coates Dyer, at that time a farmer, who subsequently became a member of Auckland Provincial Council and later a teacher at the Church of England Grammar School, Parnell, and then headmaster at Cambridge District High School. Robert went to his father's Parnell school and to St. John's College, Tamaki.

On June 23, 1885, at St Paul's Church, Auckland Robert was married to Elizabeth Augusta Minnitt, eldest daughter of Major Charles Goring Minnitt, late of the Waikato Militia, which he commanded at Kihikihi. She was a granddaughter of Sir Frederick Whitaker.

He was survived by three sons and two daughters.

- Elizabeth Caroline Dyer 1886–1967
- Eileen Dyer 1887–1969
- Robert William Dyer 1889–1962 Robert William was wounded during the war in 1915 and married in 1918.
- Guy Musgrave Dyer 1891–1971
- Humphrey Goring Dyer 1896–1977

He died on 5 August 1939 at his home on Lighthouse Road in Napier, aged 81. His wife died in 1953

== Public life ==
Robert was elected to Hamilton Borough Council in 1899 and was Mayor of Hamilton from 8 May 1901 until 13 May 1903, He had lost mayoral elections in 1898 and 1899, but was elected unopposed in 1901 and 1902. In summing up his 3½ years on the council, he said the streets were in better order, but regretted making no progress with a replacement of the Union Bridge and not completing the water supply scheme. Money had been spent on a dinner for the prime minister, possibly a reason for his obituary describing him as an ardent supporter of Richard Seddon.
