= Lake Rotoroa (Hamilton) =

Lake in the North Island of New Zealand

Lake Rotoroa / Hamilton Lake
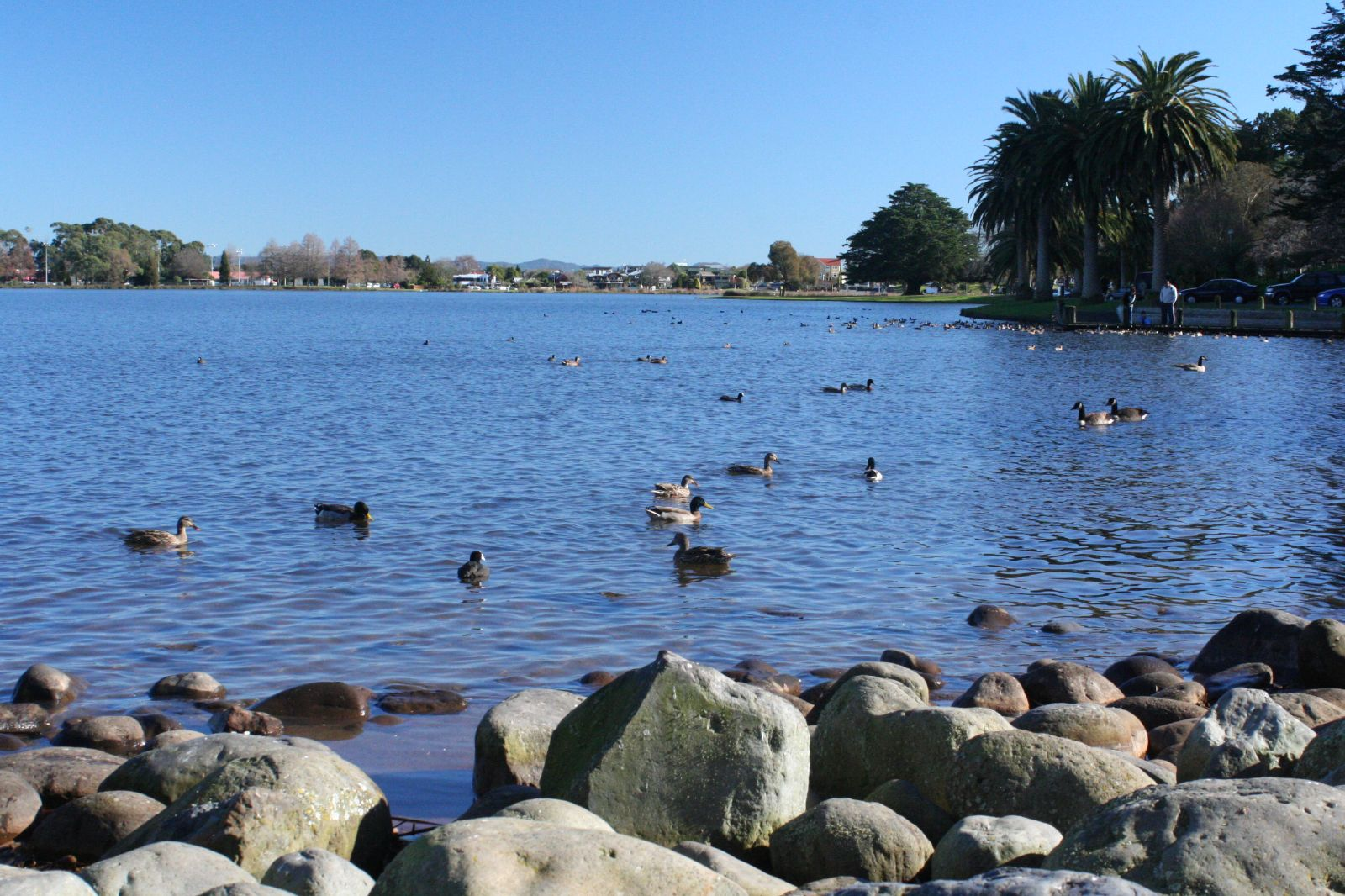

- Location of Lake Rotoroa / Hamilton Lake in New Zealand
- Interactive map of Lake Rotoroa / Hamilton Lake
- Location: Hamilton, Waikato, North Island
- Coordinates: 37.799°S 175.274°E
- Type: eutrophic
- Primary outflows: Waitawhiriwhiri Stream
- Catchment area: 258 ha (640 acres)
- Basin countries: New Zealand
- Surface area: 54 ha (130 acres)
- Average depth: 2.4 m (7 ft 10 in)
- Max. depth: 6 m (20 ft)
- Water volume: 1.3 km^{3} (1,100,000 acre⋅ft)
- Residence time: approx. 2 years
- Surface elevation: 37.15 metres (121.9 ft)

Lake Rotoroa or Hamilton Lake (officially Lake Rotoroa / Hamilton Lake) is a lake in Hamilton, Waikato, North Island, New Zealand. It has a surface area of about 54 hectares (133 acres) and an average depth of 2.4 metres (7 ft 10 in). It is the home of the Hamilton Yacht Club, which holds regular sailing in the summer.

== Geography ==
Lake Rotoroa formed, like most of the lakes in the central Waikato (Hamilton) basin, about 20,000 years ago, after the Waikato changed course to flow out at Port Waikato, rather than at Thames. It was a high-energy, braided river carrying large volumes of volcanogenic sediment (Hinuera Formation), which was deposited over and around a pre-existing hilly landscape to form an alluvial plain. In the process of depositing the alluvium, small basins were formed adjacent to the hills, and water then accumulated from local drainage and groundwater in these small basins. At Rotoroa, initially two small shallow lakes were formed with clear water in an embayment of the partially enclosing hills, a low spur off the hills separating them. Peat growth in the adjacent Rukuhia bog to the west and south then expanded and deepened as net precipitation increased as climate became warmer and wetter in the region, lifting regional water tables. The peat then encroached on to the alluvial dam holding in the two shallow lakes, forming a second storey barrier on top so that the two lakes coalesced into a single deeper lake with brownish peat-stained water, submerging the low spur.

Innes Common, to the west, is 28 hectares (68 acres) of former wetland, bought by the Domain Board to protect the lake and drained some time after 1883. It was named after the Innes family from 1956.

Near the cafe, a shelter covers the old locomotive, F230, donated in 1957.

On Ruakiwi Rd an ivy-covered memorial arch to Arthur Swarbrick, former chairman of the Hamilton Domain Board, dates from 1929.

The lake is sometimes affected by cyanobacteria, due to its high nutrient levels. However, the eutrophic quality of the lake has improved since 1998 due to regrowth of macrophytes, such as charophytes.

== History ==
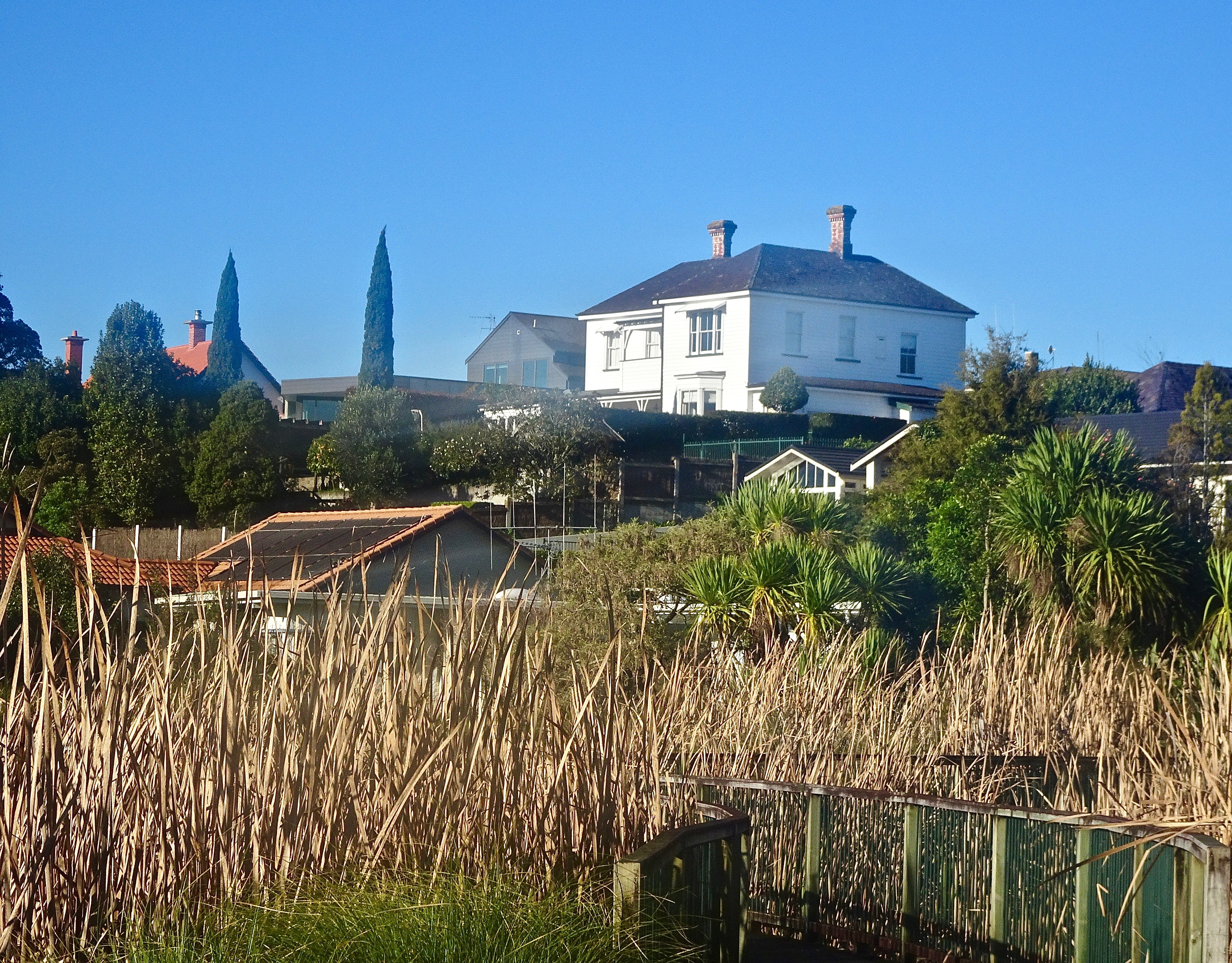
Lake House viewed from the boardwalk. It was designed by Isaac Richardson Vialou in 1872 for Alfred Cox as the homestead of the Rukuhia Estate, which originally covered 6,000 hectares. Vialou became first mayor of Hamilton in 1878.

In 1959, 11,000 litres (388 cu ft) of sodium arsenate was poured in the lake to control weeds. Arsenic is still in the sediment and eating fish from the lake is not recommended; it is on Regional Council's contaminated sites list. Copper, lead, mercury and zinc also exceed the Australian and New Zealand Environment and Conservation Council (ANZECC) guideline value in parts of the lake.

On 26 August 2021, the official dual name of the lake was standardised as Lake Rotoroa / Hamilton Lake, having previously been Lake Rotoroa (Hamilton Lake) since 1974.

== Sports ==
Lake Rotoroa is a venue for many sports.

At Innes Common, a park on the west side of the lake is the Waikato Hockey Association Sports Ground.

Innes Common also provides the best access to the lake for watersports. Small sailing boats and canoes are frequently seen on the lake. The lake is home to Hamilton Yacht Club which has been at the lake since 1938. The yacht club has members sailing Optimists, P Class, Starlings, ILCAs and Zephyrs with the occasional Frostbite still to be seen. It also holds a Learn to Sail programme and has regular racing on Wednesday evening and Saturday afternoons during the summer https://hyc.org.nz/. The lake is also popular for Waka Ama and Dragon Boating. The lake is too small for rowing skiffs because as soon as they get up to top speed they have to stop. The lake is better suited to slower boats that can turn easily. Powerboats are not permitted on the lake except for official council purposes and safety/coach boats.

The 3.8-kilometre (2.4 mi) scenic path around the lake makes it a suitable venue for walking and running. The Hamilton Road Runners Club is based at the Hamilton Yacht Club and meets there for runs every Thursday evening and Saturday morning, as well as hosting a running event at the lake each year in summer. There are water fountains at the playground at the north-west side of the lake and also at Innes Common.

There are also short bush walks and a small golf green on the west side of the lake.

== See also ==
- Hamilton Lake, the suburb which surrounds the lake
