= Beale Cottage =

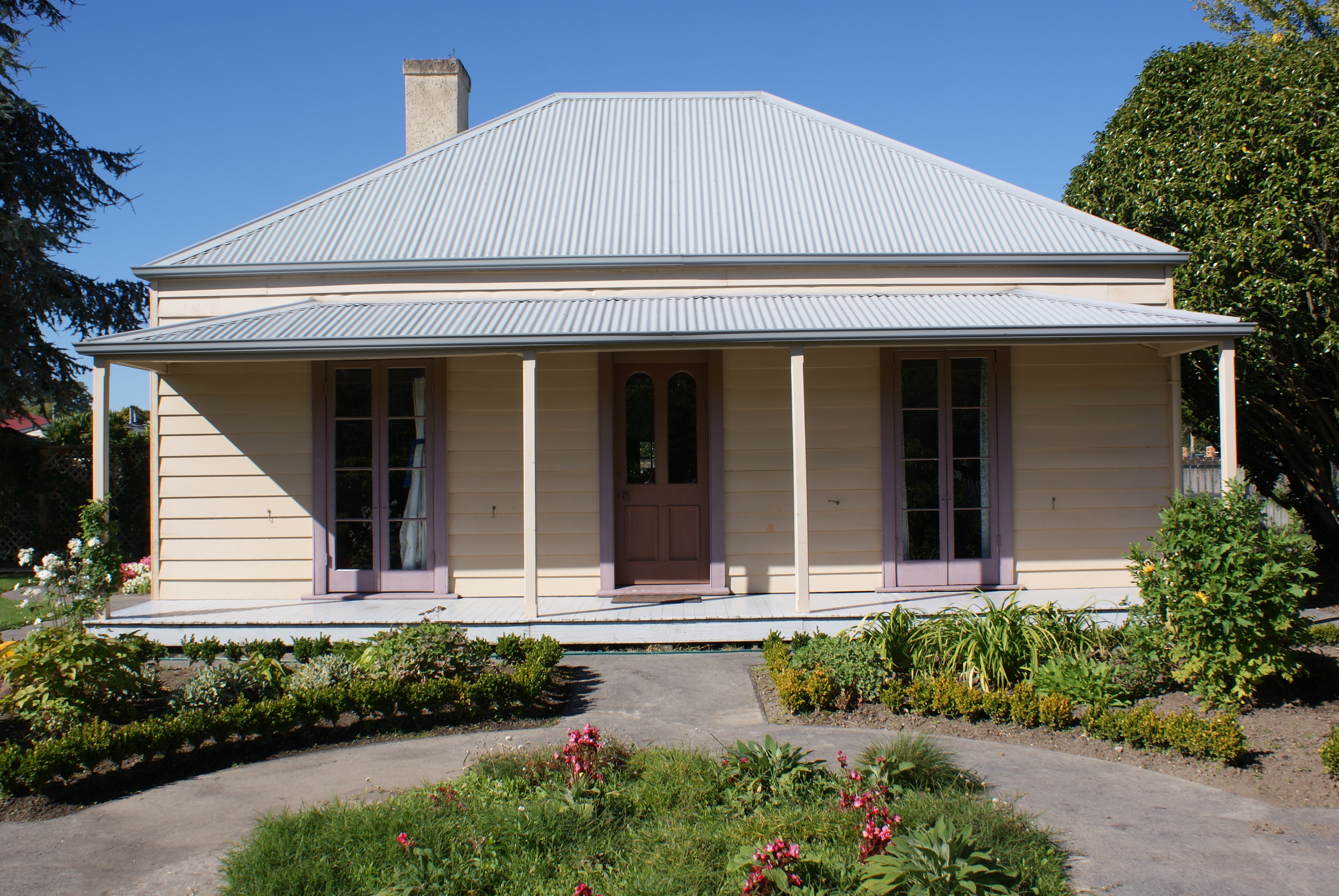
- Beale Cottage in 2009

- Location within New Zealand
- 37.7892°S 175.2922°E
- Location: Hamilton, New Zealand

History
- Built: 1872

Site notes
- Architect: Bernard Charles Beale
- Governing body: Hamilton City Council

Heritage New Zealand – Category 1
- Designated: 19 March 1987
- Reference no.: 769

Beale Cottage is situated on the corner of Beale and Grey street in Hamilton, New Zealand. Constructed in 1872, it stands as one of Hamilton's oldest surviving homes. It was designed by one of Hamilton's first European settlers, Dr. Bernard Beale, and used as his family residence, surgery and registry office. Its importance derives from its connection with Beale and the beginnings of modern medical practices in Hamilton, thus giving reason for the Hamilton City Council to later declare the cottage as an Historic Reserve in 1994. It is also a Category I listing with the New Zealand Historic Places Trust.

== Bernard Charles Beale ==
Bernard Charles Beale was born in London on 10 September 1830 to Thomas and Sophia Beale. Beale was a student at London Hospital from 1849 to 1852. Emigrating to Nelson, New Zealand in 1861, Beale arrived and settled in Hamilton four years later as fourth regiment of Waikato militia. During this time, militia men were granted land in return for their services and on 3 July 1872, Beale purchased land which is the site where Beale Cottage stands today. Beale became a member of Hamilton Borough Council in 1878, and later became Mayor. However, his role as Mayor was short lived due to a confrontational and temperative attitude. Beale was declared bankrupt in 1879, and in 1880, Beale Cottage was sold to Edward Aeneus Harker in 1881. Beale left Hamilton in 1886, along with his wife and nine children for Auckland, where he retired and died in 1910, aged 79.

Beale was a well-respected and honorable man. His efforts in his profession were noticed by the hundreds he treated throughout his time serving as a practitioner.

== Design ==
Designed by Beale, the cottage reflects a typical colonial cottage of the early settlement period. Since its erection Beale Cottage has stood the test of time and has conquered all environmental conditions. It's fair to say the house is in good condition, with most of its first structural fittings still remaining today. Designed by Beale himself, the home reflects the way of life of an early medical practitioner in his profession and home. The original layout is believed to have been a square plan with four rooms with a central hallway. The bedroom and lounge was located in the front two rooms with the surgery and kitchen located in the back rooms. Beale Cottage, was larger to that of most settlers' cottages of that period, which would usually have smaller sized rooms.

== History of site and owners ==
- 1872 — 3 July. Land granted to Bernard Charles Beale.
- 1881 — Transfer of ownership to Edward Aeneus Harker.
- 1887 — Transfer of ownership to John Sloper Edgecumbe.
- 1919–1927 — Original allotment of land subdivided into four lots. Beale cottage is located on lot 4.
- 1920 — Transfer of ownership to George Earnest Forrest.
- 1927 — Transfer of ownership to G F E Edgecumbe and J H Edgecumbe.
- 1927 — Transfer of ownership to George Earnest Forrest.
- 1959 — Transmission to George Fredrick Forrest and Thomas Christopher.
- 1961 — Transfer of ownership to Louisa May Forrest.
- 1992 — Transfer of ownership to Hamilton City Council.

== Heritage information ==
In 1994 Hamilton City Council declared the site Beale cottage stands on as an Historic Reserve. This requires the council to ensure the land is preserved in its original state.

== Future ==
Hamilton City Council will focus on the historical development of the place and people associated with it. The cottage could be used as a historical educational tool and low scale events.

== Tour ==
The cottage is open to the public by appointment only.
