= Isaac Richardson Vialou =

English-born New Zealand builder, architect and mayor

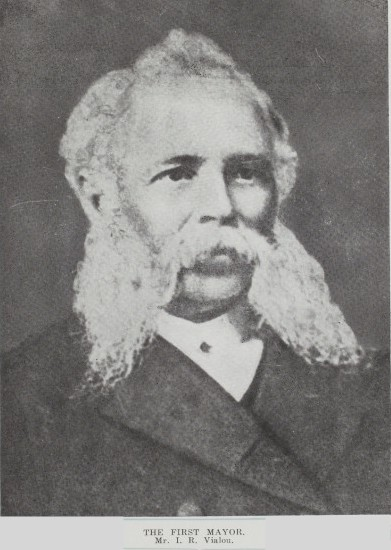

1st Mayor of Hamilton
- In office 5 February 1878 – 18 December 1878
- Succeeded by: John Blair Whyte

Personal details
- Born: 1816 England
- Died: October 31, 1884 (aged 67–68) Ohinemutu, Rotorua, New Zealand
- Spouse: Elizabeth Wood (m. 1838)

Isaac Richardson Vialou (1816 – 31 October 1884) was a builder, architect and the first Mayor of Hamilton, New Zealand. He was born in England and emigrated to New Zealand in 1858.

== Early life and family ==
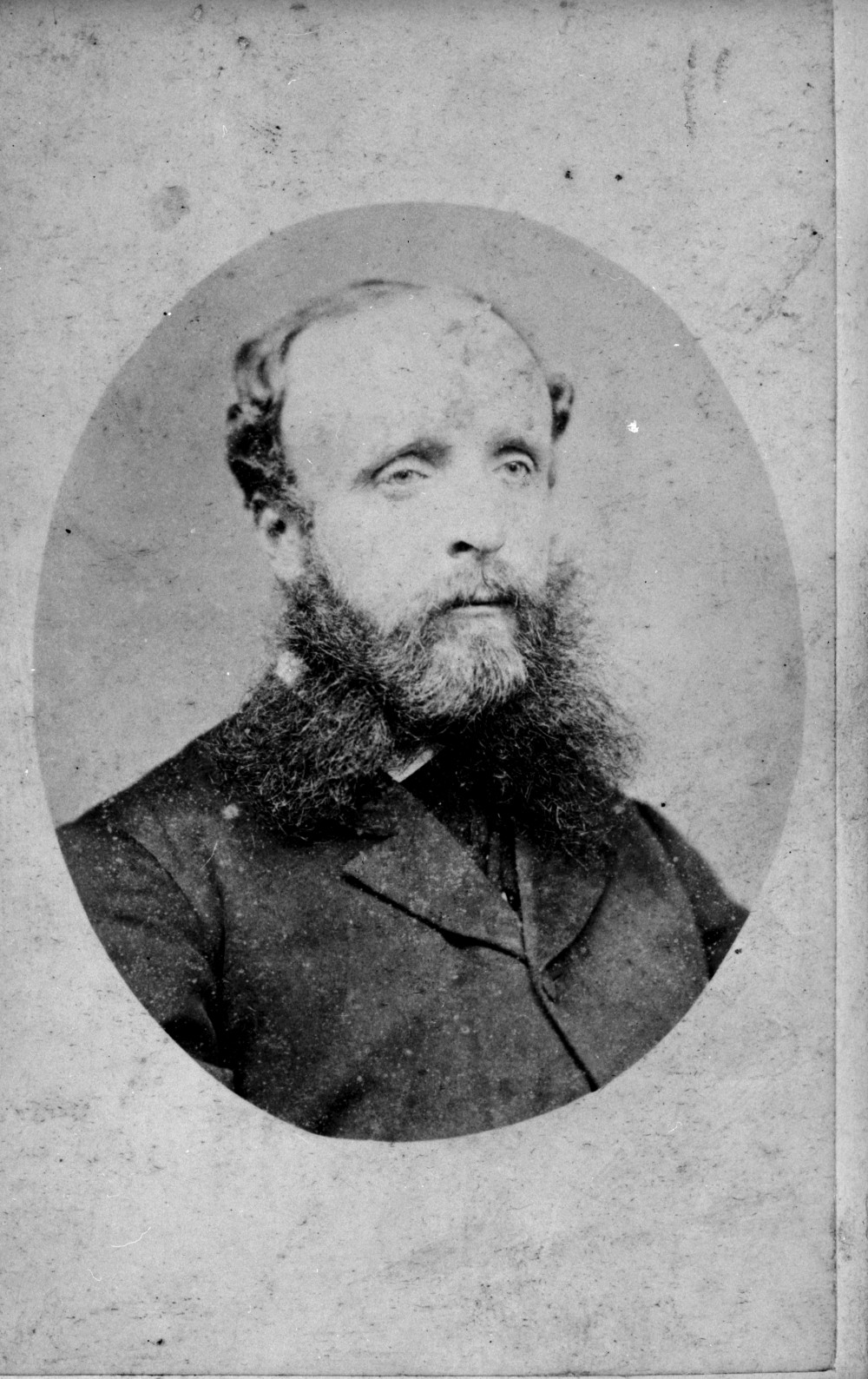
Isaac Richardson Vialou in 1878

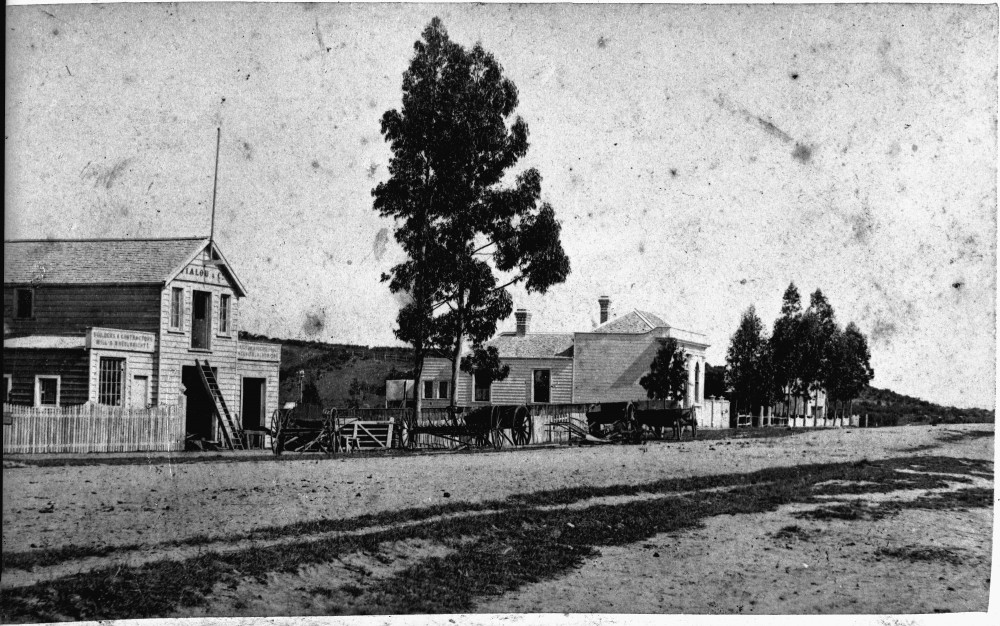
Isaac's house, shop and factories covered 2 acres on Victoria St, between Hood and Collingwood Streets from 1872 to 1886. The other building in the photo is the National Bank of New Zealand, opened in 1873 and transferred to this building in 1874

Isaac was born in 1816, married Elizabeth Wood on 28 January 1838 and was recorded as a bankrupt builder and decorator at 37 Fish Street Hill, London in 1856. He described himself as an architect for the London Armoury Company, presumably when they built their factory in 1856.

Their family consisted of at least two daughters, Emily and Louise, and a son.

== Auckland ==
He emigrated to Wairoa in 1858 and by 1859 he was selling a farm near Ōtāhuhu and a J R Vialou ('J' was often used for his first initial, even including his probate) was advertising as an architect at Smale's Point. He built several prominent buildings, including the Auckland courthouse on Chancery St in 1860. An 1863 advert for his Sanitary Depot in Victoria Street was for ‘‘importers of stone, cement and building materials, manufacturers of bricks pipes etc, stockists of closets, lavatories, hand basins etc’’. The brickworks was at Point Chevalier. Isaac must have returned to London, as he returned from there in 1863. By 1864 Isaac was running the Auckland Hotel. He also took on the Greyhound Hotel in 1867, but transferred it to I Vialou later that year and then, largely due to the recession, went bankrupt, though his family still owned property. His pig farm at Point Chevalier was sold under a court order in 1868 and he was in the Debtors' Prison that year.

== Hamilton ==
Isaac's fortunes must have improved quickly, for he sold a Panmure hotel in 1872 and was architect for Alfred Cox, to build the now listed, Lake House, at Hamilton the same year. Another of his houses on the NZ Historic Places Register is Maungawhare in Otumoetai, built in 1878. In 1872, he built his house and carriage works on Victoria St, between Hood and Collingwood Streets. In 1873 that Hamilton builder, wheelwright and blacksmith partnership with Thomasson & Co came to an end and became Vialou & Co, which made agricultural implements, mattresses, cabinets and picture frames, as well as being a builder, timber merchant, millwright, wheelwright, painter, surveyor and architect. He had one of his apprentices sentenced to 48 hours in the lock-up, with bread and water. However, he also hosted an annual dinner for his staff.

== Mayor of Hamilton ==
He was elected to Hamilton Town Board in 1876, the same year that his architectural work was criticised in court. Voting was 90 : 72 : 8 when Isaac was elected as Hamilton's first mayor in 1878. The main issues during his term as mayor were a bridge over the Waikato and extension of the railway towards Thames. During the ceremony marking the end of his term as mayor, he started driving the first pile of the Union Bridge.

== Retirement and death ==
After leaving office he remained on the council, until he resigned in 1882. He also continued with his business, such as building the Waikato Hotel in Hamilton East in 1879. An 1880 guide said, "whatever he does is done in such a first-class style as cannot be excelled in Hamilton, or Auckland. . . his establishment, taking it as a whole, is the most complete one of the kind in the colony." In 1881 he retired, passing his business on to others. The premises were put up for sale in 1885 and sold in 1886.

Isaac became ill and returned to Auckland, before moving to Ohinemutu in 1884, to manage Lake House Hotel. He died later that year, on Friday 31 October, after suffering, "delicate health, and apoplexy", aged 68.

== Vialou Street ==
Vialou Street in Hamilton was named after their first mayor in 1913. The street was formed in 1917.
