= George Edgecumbe =

New Zealand newspaper proprietor and businessman

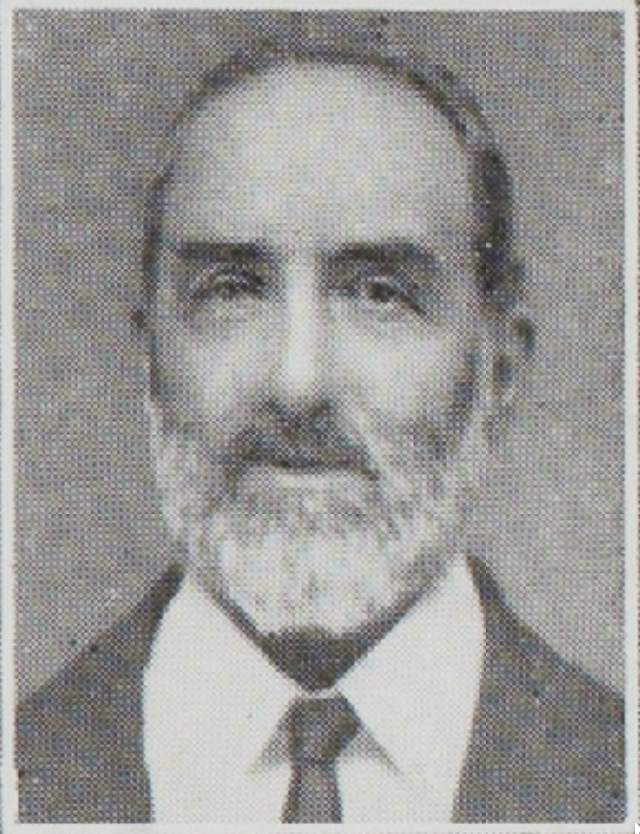

13th Mayor of Hamilton
- In office 1899–1901
- Preceded by: William Dey
- Succeeded by: Robert William Dyer

Personal details
- Born: 4 January 1845 Chippenham
- Died: 11 March 1930 (aged 85) Remuera, Auckland
- Spouse: Annie Hume m. 27 April 1871
- Occupation: Publisher

George Edgecumbe (4 January 1845 – 11 March 1930) was a New Zealand newspaper proprietor and businessman. He was born in Chippenham, Wiltshire, England on 4 January 1845.

George's father was Henry Edgecumbe, a grocer, or confectioner and later a brewer and mason, who immigrated from Devon with his sons, George, Frank and John Sloper (b 1849), on the John Duncan, arriving in Auckland on 23 January 1864. They moved to Ngāruawāhia and he died in 1885.

== Trader ==
In 1873 George took over Charles Bell's general store opposite the wharf at Ngāruawāhia, which he ran until 1876, when he became an agent and accountant, though he'd previously promoted his brother, John's, Karakariki mill. He was probably helped with just remaining credit-worthy by marrying the bank manager's sister.

== Newspapers ==
He was at the meeting which decided to form the Waikato Times and joined its staff in Ngāruawāhia, moving with it to Hamilton in 1875. George became manager in 1878 and took control of the paper in 1882. The Times increased its Bank of New Zealand loan, until the bank leased it back to George. However, in 1896, the bank sold the masthead and property to the Waikato Advocate. George's version of events was set out in the first issue of his Waikato Argus, when he said he'd arranged with the late F. A. Whitaker M.P. to be the proprietor. George wished to retain a conservative paper and started the Waikato Argus on 11 July 1896, with Henry Holloway as editor. Henry had also been the first editor of the Waikato Times and was again editor when the lease was lost. Although popular in Hamilton and winning a case against BNZ, George had opposition, as evidenced by an Auckland paper writing, "The B.N.Z. Estates Company 'chucked' George Edgecumbe out of the Times, and he has started the loathsome contemporary across the road, and is making things warm for the Bank and the Government generally." When the Waikato Argus merged with the Waikato Times in 1914, George became chairman of the company for a few years.

== Other interests ==
George was also chairman of Waikato Horticultural Society, South Auckland Racing Club, Auckland Education Board (1903–1914), Grand Master of masonic Lodge Beta, the first chairman Hamilton High School Board, a member of Waikato Hospital Board, a member of Hamilton Club, Hamilton Bowling Club, the Church of England, president of Hamilton Football Club (rugby), president of Hamilton Cricket Club and on the Central Power Board.

== Civic duties ==
He was chairman of the Ngāruawāhia Town Board from 1875 to 1878, a member of Hamilton Borough and City Council (1885–7, 1905–7) and mayor from 1899 to 1801. Edgecumbe Street in Whitiora was renamed after him in 1923

== Family ==
He retired to Remuera, in about 1919, where he died in 1930, leaving three sons and four daughters. Another daughter had died in 1919 and his wife, Annie (née Hume, married 1871), had died on 28 May 1924. His eldest son was also named George and other sons were born in 1881 and 1886, and daughters in 1873 and 1874.

Political offices
Preceded by William Dey	Mayor of Hamilton; 1899–1901	Succeeded by Robert William Dyer
