= William Australia Graham =

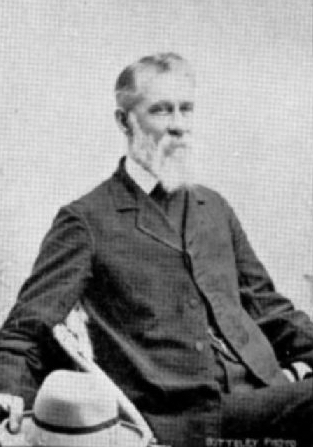
- William Australia Graham about 1902

7th Mayor of Hamilton
- In office 1884–1887
- Preceded by: Robert Peat
- Succeeded by: Charles Barton

Auckland Provincial Council Waikato
- In office 1873–1876

Personal details
- Born: 22 November 1841 Auckland, New Zealand
- Died: 9 May 1916 (aged 74) Hamilton, New Zealand
- Spouse: Alice Coombes (m. 1872)
- Occupation: Surveyor

William Australia Graham (22 November 1841 – 9 May 1916) was a New Zealand surveyor, mediator, farmer, politician and mayor. He was born in Auckland, New Zealand, on 22 November 1841, the third son of George Graham. He went to Clewer House School, Windsor, and Hele's School, Exeter and returned home in 1854.

William was a Government surveyor, and produced a plan for Hamilton East in 1864, just after the invasion of the Waikato. In 1865 his father was instructed to contact Wiremu Tamihana. William acted as interpreter for General Carey, leading to Wiremu's submission to the Queen and acquiescence to the invasion of the Waikato. King Mahuta presented him with a patu parāoa, in recognition of his mediation. In 1887 he advocated for fair treatment of Māori land.

From the mid-1860s to 1882, he and his brother, Samuel, developed over 1,000 acres (400 ha) at Tamahere, on former Ngāti Haua land. In 1882 he was secretary of Waikato Farmers' Cooperative and, from 1884, chairman of the North New Zealand Farmers' Co-operative Association, formed to establish a sugar beet industry. He influenced Julius Vogel to introduce the Beet-root Sugar Act 1884. The Coop was defunct by 1887.

On 5 March 1872 William married Alice, eldest daughter of Walter Coombes, of the shipping company Coombes and Daldy. That day ships in Auckland harbour were decorated with bunting. Their 3 sons and 6 daughters included a son born on 11 February 1897, Alice Australia Buckleton, Hilda Herberta Blanche Hume, Mrs J. H. Hume, Mrs C. L. & Mrs A. C. Macdiarmid. and Cedric Kenny Onslow Graham, who was born on 21 December 1889 and died on 16 September 1916 at the battle of the Somme, having ignored his father's advice to come home. Alice shared her husband's interest in the Anglican church and charitable work.

He represented Waikato on Auckland Provincial Council from 24 November 1873 to 1876 and was elected Mayor of Hamilton on 27 November 1884, beating his predecessor, Robert Peat, by 84 votes to 56. As mayor he gained Hamilton 120 acres (49 ha) of endowments from the government. He resigned as mayor on 21 May 1887, when he was insulted by a request for a public meeting to review a decision.

He was also appointed borough representative on Auckland Hospital and Charitable Aid Board in 1885 and became chairman of the Waikato Board, when it was formed in 1886. He opposed attempts to establish cottage hospitals around Waikato, and, in 1887, arranged for purchase of the site still used by Waikato Hospital. He retired from the hospital board in December 1888.

In 1882 he moved to "The Lodge" on Hamilton's riverside. It had been a private girls' school, run by Mrs Watts, built on what had been Ngāti Wairere's Kirikiriroa pā. In his later years he was an insurance agent in 1887, a magistrate (1893) and continued his church work.

He was reported as having a lengthy illness in 1904. He was badly injured in a horse and buggy accident and died in his sleep on 9 May 1916, aged 74, after many months of failing health. Alice Graham died in October 1931. A marble pillar, marking the graves of the Graham family, remains at Hamilton East Cemetery.
