= Francis Dewsbury Pinfold =

New Zealand politician

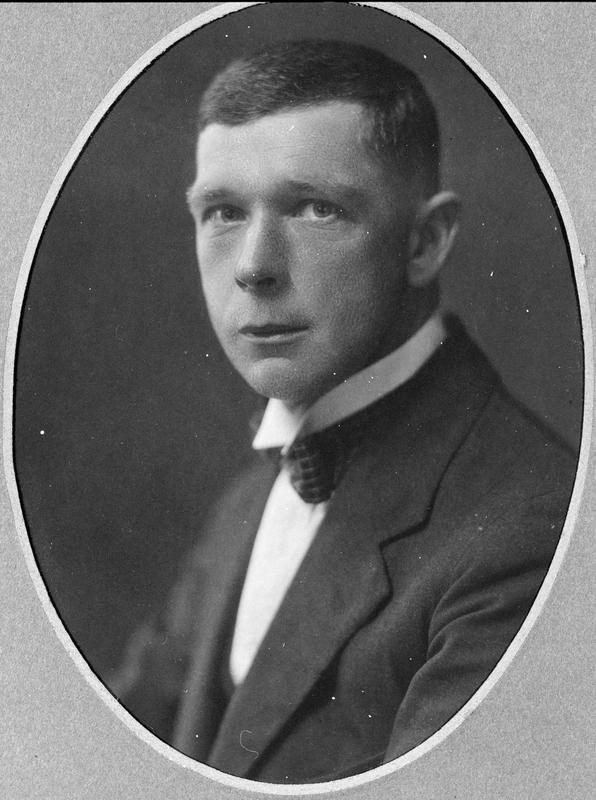

22nd Mayor of Hamilton
- In office 1931–1933
- Preceded by: John Robert Fow
- Succeeded by: John Robert Fow

Personal details
- Born: 21 March 1892 New Plymouth, New Zealand
- Died: 19 October 1976 (aged 84) Hamilton, New Zealand
- Spouse: Claudine Heather Norman (m. 1916)

Francis Dewsbury Pinfold (21 March 1892 – 19 October 1976) was a New Zealand doctor and local politician. He served as mayor of Hamilton from 1931 to 1933.

== Early life and family ==
Francis Dewsbury Pinfold was the 4th son of Elizabeth Pinfold (née Marks), and Reverend Pinfold, born in 1892 in New Plymouth. His father, James Thomas Pinfold (28 April 1855 – 30 July 1933), was a Methodist minister at Thames, Gisborne, Hamilton, Rangiora, Springston, Mosgiel and Wellington. Francis was one of 10 children and went to school at Hamilton West, Auckland Grammar School and Christchurch Boys' High School.

== Career ==
He graduated as a doctor from the University of Otago in 1916. As a student he took jobs building Otago Central railway, shearing and school teaching. He became a resident clinician at Dunedin Hospital, a junior and then senior house surgeon at Waikato Hospital, from which he resigned in 1916 to join the army. Shortly after, he married Claudine Heather Norman on 18 April 1916. In 1917 he joined the New Zealand Expeditionary Force as a major with the Medical Corps on the Western Front. On his return he started a practice at 389 Victoria St. He became an honorary consultant in cardiology at Waikato Hospital where he introduced the first electrocardiograph. He retired from medical practice in 1964.

He was a hunter, fisherman and president of Waikato Acclimatisation Society and Hamilton Gun Club. He was also active in Hamilton Orphans’ Club, Hamilton Fire Board, Auckland Acclimatisation Society, Auckland Swimming Centre, Whitiora School Committee and Okete (Camp Fergusson) and Port Waikato Children’s Camps. He qualified as a pilot and was president of the Waikato Aero Club from 1938 to 1945.

== Mayoralty ==
He was elected as a councillor on Hamilton Borough Council in 1925. In 1929 he lost a mayoral election against John Fow by 82 votes, but won the next election against him by 272, standing on a platform of opposing a "Mad orgy of spending". He supported paving more footpaths, but opposed the Anglesea cutting and removal of Garden Place hill. Hamilton Municipal Offices on Alma Street were built during his term in office. All but two councillors supported him standing again in 1933, but John Fow won by 678 votes. Pinfold put his name forward for mayor in 1938, but then withdrew it. He twice stood to be a candidate for the National Party in 1943 and 1959.

== Death ==
He died on 19 October 1976 and was cremated at Hamilton Park Cemetery, Newstead.

Political offices
Preceded by John Robert Fow	Mayor of Hamilton; 1931–1933	Succeeded by John Robert Fow
