= Adrian Penfold =

Adrian Philip Penfold OBE MRTPI FRISC FRSA
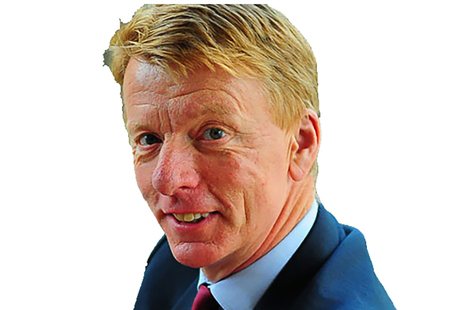
- Adrian Penfold
- Born: 9 March 1952
- Education: Bedford Modern School
- Alma mater: University of Essex and Kingston Polytechnic
- Known for: Planning expert

Adrian Philip Penfold (born 9 March 1952) is a British planning expert and Government adviser, known for promoting the simplification of the development consent system as a means of encouraging sustainable urban regeneration. He was head of the Enterprise Zone team at the London Docklands Development Corporation between 1988 and 1990, Head of Planning and Design at Dartford Borough Council between 1991 and 1996, has been Head of Planning at British Land since 1996 and has been a key planning adviser to Government most notably authoring the Penfold Review of Non-Planning Consents in 2010.

== Life ==
Adrian Philip Penfold was born 9 March 1952. He was educated at Bedford Modern School, the University of Essex and Kingston Polytechnic.

Penfold started his career as a planning assistant with Bedfordshire County Council in 1973 before moving to the London Borough of Hammersmith and Fulham where he worked in a number of roles from 1976 to 1988. He then moved to the London Docklands Development Corporation where he was head of the central Enterprise Zone team between 1988 and 1990. His Docklands projects included Canary Wharf. Penfold then became Head of Planning and Design at Dartford Borough Council between 1990 and 1996 before moving to British Land as Chief Planner between 1996 and 2001, Head of Planning and Environment between 2001 and 2010 and Head of Planning and Corporate Responsibility since 2010.

In 2010, Penfold was asked by the Government to review the impact of non-planning consents – 'those consents that have to be obtained alongside or after, and separate from, planning permission to complete a development' – on development activity in the United Kingdom. He published his findings in 2010 concluding that non-planning consents can have a serious impact on how efficiently and effectively the development process operates: their complexity and interaction with the planning system imposes additional costs and risks for business. His proposals were designed to simplify the interaction of non-planning consents with the planning system which he argued would encourage development, investment and therefore economic growth.

Penfold became a member of the Royal Town Planning Institute in 1978, a Fellow of the Royal Institution of Chartered Surveyors in 2015 and is a Fellow of the Royal Society of Arts. He was made OBE in the Queen's Birthday Honours List in 2015 for Services to the Property Industry and public service to Planning.
