= Mark Penfold =

English footballer

Personal information
- Date of birth: 10 December 1956 (age 69)
- Place of birth: Woolwich, England
- Position: Right back

Senior career*
Years	Team	Apps	(Gls)
1973–1979	Charlton Athletic	70	(0)
1979–1981	Orient	3	(1)
1981–1983	Maidstone United	62	(6)
1985–1990	Gravesend & Northfleet		
- * Club domestic league appearances and goals

Mark Penfold (born 10 December 1956) is an English former professional footballer who played in the Football League as a defender.
