= Elizabeth Pinfold =

New Zealand recipient of the Queen Elisabeth Medal

Elizabeth Pinfold (née Marks, 1859–1927) was a New Zealand recipient of the Belgian Queen Elisabeth Medal for her work supporting Belgian soldiers in World War I.

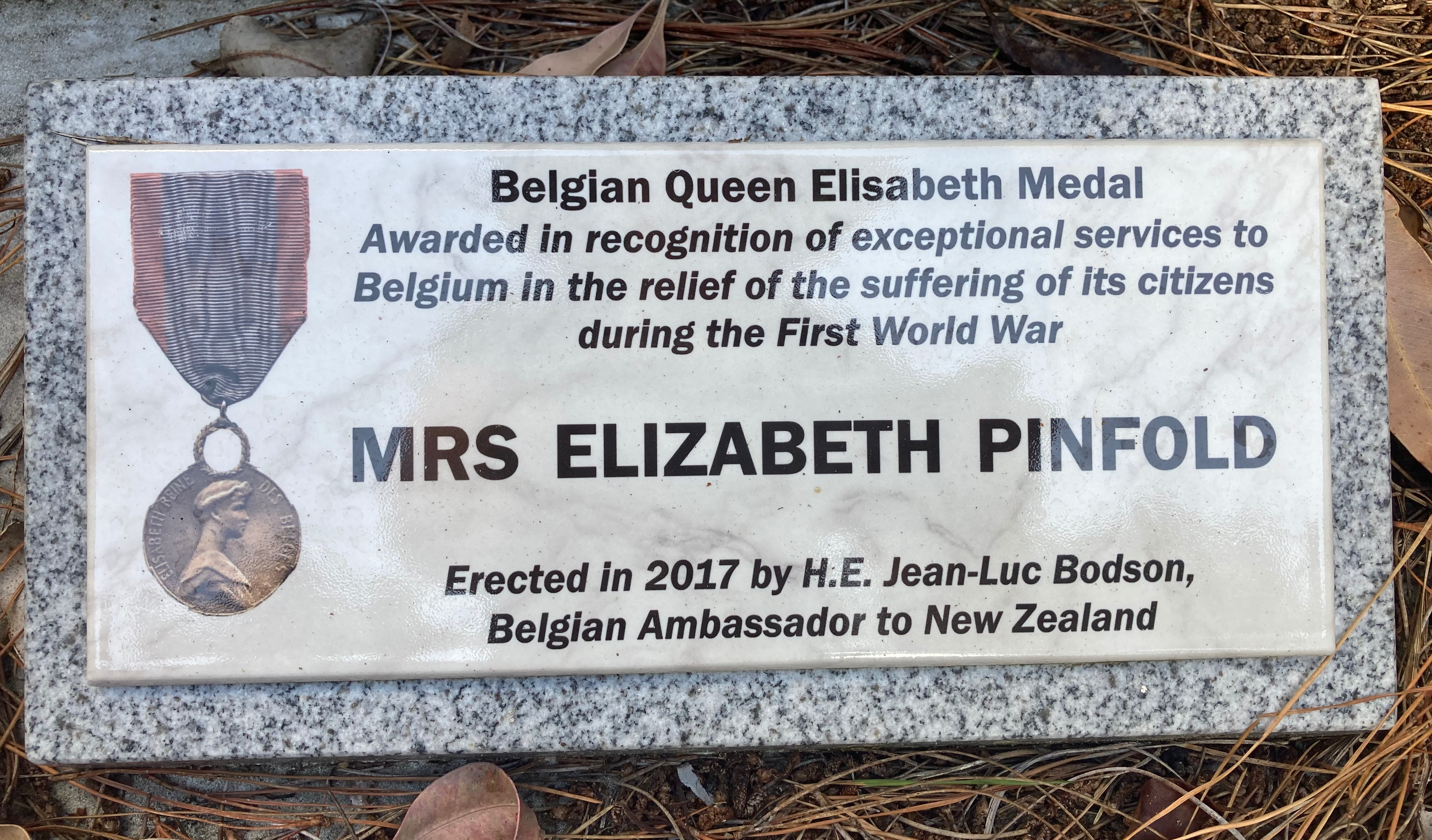
Plaque on Pinfold's grave, Karori Cemetery, 2021

Pinfold was born in 1895 the daughter of Captain Marks of Tauranga. In World War I she was active in the Belgian Relief Fund. Learning that Belgian soldiers needed clothing she wrote to newspapers around New Zealand to gather donations of clothing for needy Belgian refugees and soldiers.

In recognition of her contribution to the war effort she was one of 33 New Zealand women awarded the Queen Elisabeth Medal (Médaille de la Reine Elisabeth) by the Belgian government.

She married the Rev. James Thomas Pinfold in 1887. They had ten children one of whom was doctor and local government politician Francis Dewsbury Pinfold.

Pinfold died in an accident in Karori, Wellington in 1927. She was buried in the Karori Cemetery. In 2017 a commemorative plaque was unveiled on her grave.
