= Graeme Pinfold =

Australian rules footballer

Personal information
- Full name: Graeme Arthur Pinfold
- Born: 24 April 1936; Sea Lake, Victoria
- Died: 17 December 1986 (aged 50); West Melbourne, Victoria
- Original team: Albury
- Height: 170 cm (5 ft 7 in)
- Weight: 77 kg (170 lb)

Playing career^{1}
Years	Club	Games (Goals)
1957–61	Melbourne (VFL)	20 (4)
1962–66	Preston (VFA)	28 (0)
- ^{1} Playing statistics correct to the end of 1966.

Graeme Arthur Pinfold (24 April 1936 – 17 December 1986) was an Australian rules footballer who played with Melbourne in the Victorian Football League (VFL), and with Preston in the Victorian Football Association (VFA).
