= Mayor of Hamilton, New Zealand =

Elected office

Mayor of Hamilton
- Coat of arms of Hamilton

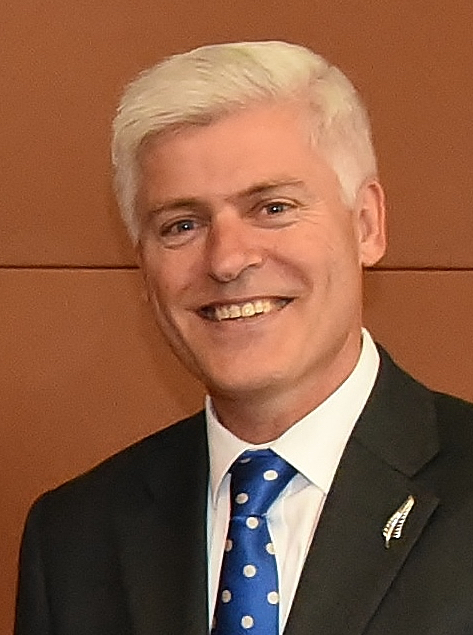
- Incumbent; Tim Macindoe since 19 October 2025
- Hamilton City Council
- Style: His/Her Worship
- Type: Council Leader
- Member of: Hamilton City Council
- Seat: Council Building Garden Place, Hamilton
- Appointer: Electorate of Hamilton
- Term length: Three years, renewable
- Inaugural holder: Isaac Richardson Vialou
- Formation: 1878
- Deputy: Geoff Taylor
- Salary: $180,335
- Website: Official website

The mayor of Hamilton is the head of the municipal government of Hamilton, New Zealand, and presides over the Hamilton City Council.

The incumbent is Tim Macindoe, who was first elected in 2025.

== History ==
Hamilton had East and West Town Boards until it was constituted under the Municipal Corporations Act 1876 on 24 December 1877 as a Borough Council, with a mayor. Mayoral elections were originally held annually but have been triennial since 1935. Elections were initially held in December, in April or May from 1901–1947, and have most recently taken place in October.

In 1989, Evans was the first woman to be elected Mayor of Hamilton. Following her retirement in 1998, all subsequent incumbents were defeated at their next election until Julie Hardaker's 2013 re-election.

== List ==
	Name	Portrait	Term of office		Reason for leaving office
1	Isaac Richardson Vialou		February 1878	December 1878	Did not contest the following election
2	John Blair Whyte		December 1878	December 1879	Did not contest the following election
3	Thomas Dawson		December 1879	March 1880	Resigned
4	Bernard Charles Beale		March 1880	December 1880	Did not contest the following election
5	John Knox		December 1880	December 1883	Did not contest the following election
6	Robert Peat		December 1883	December 1884	Defeated
7	William Australia Graham		December 1884	May 1887	Resigned
8	Charles Barton		June 1887	January 1888	Resigned
9	Isaac Coates		January 1888	October 1889	Resigned
10	William Jones		October 1889	December 1889	Did not contest the following election
(9)	Isaac Coates		December 1889	December 1892	Did not contest the following election
11	John Parr		December 1892	December 1893	Did not contest the following election
12	William Dey		December 1893	December 1899	Did not contest the following election
13	George Edgecumbe		December 1899	May 1901	Did not contest the following election
14	Robert William Dyer		May 1901	May 1903	Did not contest the following election
(8)	Charles Barton		May 1903	October 1903	Resigned
(12)	William Dey		October 1903	May 1905	Did not contest the following election
15	James Shiner Bond		May 1905	May 1909	Did not contest the following election
16	Alexander Young		May 1909	May 1912	Did not contest the following election (was elected as MP for Waikato, 1911)
17	Arthur Edwards Manning		May 1912	November 1915	Resigned
18	John Edwin Hammond		December 1915	June 1916	Died in office
19	John Robert Fow		June 1916	May 1917	Did not contest the following election
20	John William Ellis		May 1917	August 1918	Died in office
(19)	John Robert Fow		August 1918	May 1919	Did not contest the following election
21	Percy Harold Watts		May 1919	April 1920	Resigned
(19)	John Robert Fow		May 1920	May 1931	Defeated
22	Francis Dewsbury Pinfold		May 1931	May 1933	Defeated
(19)	John Robert Fow		May 1933	May 1938	Did not contest the following election
23	Harold David Caro		May 1938	November 1953	Defeated
24	Roderick Braithwaite		November 1953	December 1959	Did not contest the following election
25	Denis Rogers		December 1959	October 1968	Defeated
26	Mike Minogue		October 1968	May 1976	Resigned
27	Bruce Beetham		May 1976	October 1977	Did not contest the following election
28	Ross Jansen		October 1977	November 1989	Defeated
29	Margaret Evans		November 1989	November 1998	Retired
30	Russ Rimmington		November 1998	November 2001	Defeated
31	David Braithwaite		November 2001	November 2004	Defeated
32	Michael Redman		November 2004	May 2007	Resigned to take up position as CEO of Hamilton City Council
33	Bob Simcock		23 May 2007	31 October 2010	Named interim Mayor until local government elections in October, then elected. Defeated in 2010 Elections.
34	Julie Hardaker		1 November 2010	October 2016	Did not contest the following election
35	Andrew King		October 2016	October 2019	Defeated
36	Paula Southgate		24 October 2019	18 October 2025	Did not contest the following election
37	Tim Macindoe		19 October 2025	present	

== Sources ==
- Gibbons, P.J. (1977), Astride the River. Published for the Hamilton City Council by Whitcoulls Limited, pp317–318 and Hamilton City Council Annual Plans.
- Hamilton City Council Annual Statement of Accounts and Waikato Times index at Hamilton City Libraries.
