= Hamilton East School =

Location
- Dawson Street, Hamilton East; 37.7872°S 175.2904°E

Information
- Type: Co-educational Primary School
- Motto: "I enjoy learning" "Tino nui ki ahau ke te ako"
- Founded: 1872
- Ministry of Education Institution no.: 1731
- Principal: Pippa Wright
- Socio-economic decile: 4 (10 is highest)
- Website: www.hameast.school.nz

Hamilton East School is a co-educational primary school situated in Hamilton East, New Zealand. It is the oldest school in Hamilton on its original site. The school is part of the Hamiton East Heritage Trail and several classrooms are historic building. The school caters for Year 1-6 students.

As of 2011, Pippa Wright is the principal.

== School grounds ==
The school grounds are large, covering 2.25 hectares. Playing fields are on three levels and the school is extensively planted with native and exotic trees. The three levels are called Top Flat, Middle Flat and Bottom Flat. There is also an additional playing field across the road from the school where students play soccer.

Hamilton East School is an environmental school, and past students were involved with developing the grounds and gardens. Current students help to maintain class gardens and resolve environmental issues in the school.

There are 20 classrooms in the school. Some notable features of the school are the swimming pool, the giant Redwood tree, The Orchard (Computer room) and the library.

== Teams ==
The school is divided into three teams. These teams are:

- Kowhai - Yellow year 0-1-2
- Totara - Green year 3-4
- Kauri - Blue year 5-6
