= Bernard Charles Beale =

Bernard Beale
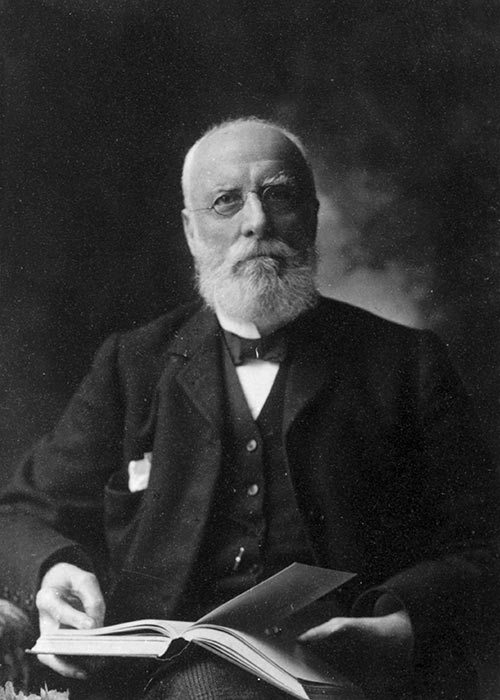
- Born: Bernard Charles Beale; 10 September 1830; London, England
- Died: 16 January 1910 (aged 79); Avondale, Auckland, New Zealand
- Occupation: Surgeon
- Known for: Mayor of Hamilton; Local body politician

Bernard Charles Beale (10 September 1830 – 16 January 1910) was a New Zealand medical doctor and local body politician. Born in England, he was a licensed surgeon assistant and also worked as a ship's surgeon before emigrating with his wife to New Zealand in 1861. He set up practice in Nelson before moving to Auckland and being commissioned in the Waikato Militia. He was given a land grant in Hamilton at the end of his military service and settled there with his wife. He practiced medicine, acted as a coroner, and became involved in local body politics. He served a brief but tempestuous term from March to December 1880 as the 4th mayor of Hamilton. He later moved back to Auckland, where he died in 1910 at the age of 79.

== Early life ==
Born in London, England on 10 September 1830, Bernard Charles Beale was the son of Thomas and Sophia Beale. His father was a surgeon and Bernard likewise entered the medical profession and began work at City of London Union's workhouse as a dispenser of medicine while training at London Hospital. After three years of training, he became a member of the Royal College of Surgeons in 1852 and qualified as a licensed assistant surgeon later that year. He was on a number of health boards administering Poor Laws and also served as a ship's surgeon from 1852 to 1853, including a voyage to British India aboard the Earl of Balcarras.

== New Zealand ==
In April 1861, Beale, by now married to Catherine née Cooke, emigrated to New Zealand, travelling as ship's surgeon aboard the Sir George Pollock. Arriving in Nelson in late August 1861, he set himself up as a medical practitioner but sought to supplement his income. He achieved this in September 1862, when he received an appointment to Nelson Hospital. He soon came into conflict with his colleagues, criticising standards of hygiene and care. An unofficial inquiry substantiated his concerns but he was discharged from his duties at the hospital in October 1863.

In April 1864, Beale was commissioned as an assistant surgeon in the 4th Regiment of the Waikato Militia, which was actively engaged in the Invasion of the Waikato. He initially worked in Auckland's outlying villages of Howick, New Zealand and Onehunga but by March 1865 was based in Hamilton, on the banks of the Waikato River. Soon afterwards, he received a land grant in the town as part of his payoff for serving with the Waikato Militia.

=== Living in Hamilton ===
Beale then started practicing medicine in Hamilton, but most of his patients had limited finances so oftentimes they were unable to pay their bills. He also acted as a medical officer for a number of friendly societies. Financially struggling, Beale briefly served for a period in 1866 as a surgeon to 3rd Regiment of the Waikato Militia, which was stationed in Cambridge at the time. In 1868, Beale was appointed Registrar of births, deaths and marriages in Hamilton. He was also made coroner. These roles supplemented his income which was important as his family expanded: he and his wife had their first child in 1863, and by 1885 they would have nine children. In 1870 he was appointed a medical referee for the Waikato District.

Beale developed a reputation for being litigious; he often took legal action against patients who did not pay for their treatment. He also sued a man who pulled his son's ears during a public debate and was charged with forcible entry of a chemist's premises when disputing the terms of a lease. Despite this, he was well regarded as a physician by both patients and other doctors. His work as coroner was seen as diligent and thorough. In early 1878, he stood for election in the Hamilton Borough Council, and was the highest polling candidate. He soon clashed with his fellow councilors, raising allegations of conflicts of interest and using intemperate language in heated debates. In March 1879, he faced calls for his resignation in response to his initiation of bankruptcy proceedings. He stayed on council and ran for mayor later that year in December but was unsuccessful. However, the elected mayor lasted only four months before resigning and forcing a re-election. Beale was successful this time, being the only candidate to stand.

In the re-election campaign, Beale had been viewed as having the skills to be a good mayor. Once elected, it was found that he handled council proceedings with a heavy hand, alienating those who had thought he would be capable in the role. When he completed his term as mayor in December 1880, he did not seek re-election, either as mayor or councillor. He continued as Hamilton's coroner as well as Registrar until resigning from those posts in 1886.

== Later life ==
Beale with his family moved to Auckland, settling in Ponsonby. He continued to practice medicine privately, but also held a position at Auckland Hospital for a time. He later took legal action against Auckland Hospital over a claim of unpaid work. In 1887, he returned to the militia, acting as brigade surgeon to the Auckland Volunteers until his retirement in 1905. Politically, he was associated with the Liberal Party. Beale died five years later on 16 January 1910 after a fall at his home in Avondale, where he was living at the time. He was survived by his wife and eight of their children; a ninth, a son, predeceased him in 1889. Beale was buried at Purewa Cemetery.

== Legacy ==
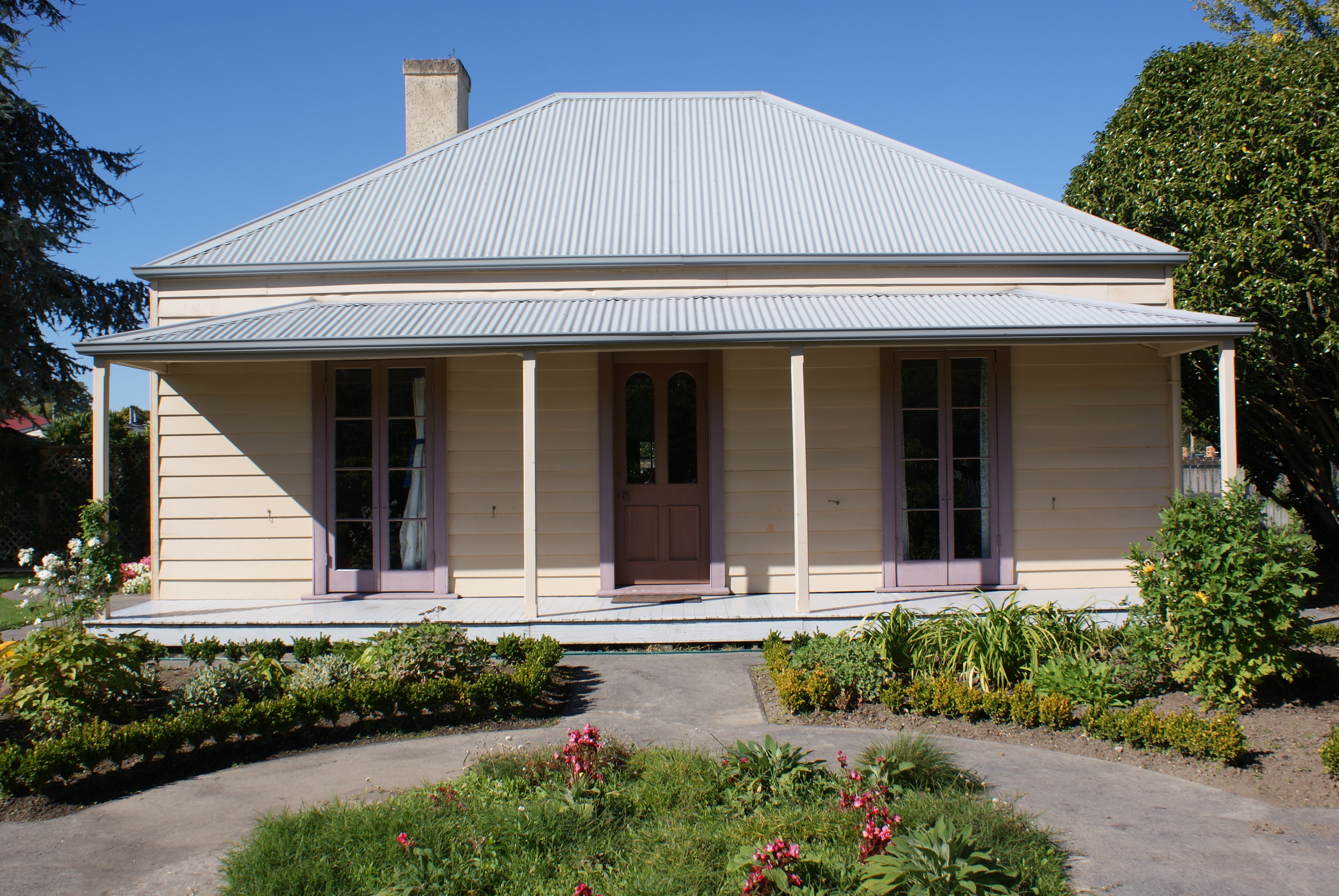
Beale's cottage in Hamilton, as it appeared in 2009

His residence in Hamilton, Beale Cottage, built in 1872, served as his surgical practice as well as the Beale family home. It still stands as the city's oldest surviving house and was listed as a Historic Place Category 1 in 1987 by Heritage New Zealand. Beale Street, where his cottage stands, was named for him.

Political offices
Preceded by Thomas Dawson	Mayor of Hamilton; March–December 1880	Succeeded by John Knox
