= John Robert Fow =

New Zealand politician

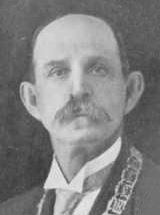
John Robert Fow

John Robert Fow (1869 – 18 September 1943) was Mayor of Hamilton, New Zealand for four terms: June 1916 to May 1917, August 1918 to May 1919, May 1920 to May 1931, and May 1933 to May 1938.

Fow was born in Louth, Lincolnshire, England in 1869 and emigrated to New Zealand with his parents when he was a boy. He worked as a sawmiller, farrier and blacksmith, carriage maker and auctioneer, before going into the furniture business.

In 1935, he was awarded the King George V Silver Jubilee Medal. He died at his home in Hamilton in 1943.
