= Charles Barton (New Zealand politician) =

New Zealand farmer, businessman, mayor and town clerk

Charles John Wright Barton
- Born: 6 February 1852; Daventry, Northamptonshire, England
- Died: 4 March 1935 (aged 83)
- Occupations: Farmer, businessman, mayor, town clerk
- Known for: Municipal service and farming/business activities in early New Zealand settlement

Charles John Wright Barton (6 February 1852 – 4 March 1935) was a New Zealand farmer, businessman, mayor and town clerk. He was born in Daventry, Northamptonshire, England, on 6 February 1852. His father died of a fever in Guangzhou five months before Charles was born. His mother Charlotte returned to England soon afterwards to give birth. In 1853, he, his mother and his uncle Henry Kinder emigrated from England to New Zealand on the Northfleet, settling in Auckland.
