= List of statistical areas in New Zealand =

This is a list of statistical areas in New Zealand, as defined by Statistics New Zealand in the statistical area 2 (SA2) and statistical area 3 (SA3) boundaries set out in the Statistical standard for geographic areas 2023.

All SA2 areas are listed here, in non-italics. These are areas of land, such as a high-density urban area, farmland area, wilderness are or water area, with a community that interacts socially and economically. An SA2 area usually has a shared road network, shared community facilities, shared historical or social links and socio-economic similarities. In cities, SA2 areas are usually suburbs or part-suburbs with 2,000 to 4,000 residents. In rural districts, many SA2 areas have populations of fewer than 1,000 residents.

Some SA3 areas are also listed here in italics. These are groups of SA2 areas that form a large suburb, town, rural community or group of settlements. Some SA3 areas have a population of 5,000 to 10,000 people.

== North Island ==
=== Northland Region ===
==== Far North District ====
- North Cape
- Rangaunu Harbour
- Inlets Far North District
- Karikari Peninsula
- Tangonge
- Ahipara
- Kaitaia East
- Kaitaia West
- Rangitihi
- Oruru-Parapara
- Taumarumaru
- Herekino-Takahue
- Peria
- Taemaro-Oruaiti
- Whakapaku
- Hokianga North
- Kohukohu-Broadwood
- Whakarara
- Kaeo
- Omahuta Forest-Horeke
- Hokianga South
- Lake Manuwai-Kapiro
- Ōkaihau
- Rangitane-Purerua
- Waipapa
- Puketotara
- Waima Forest
- Riverview
- Waipoua Forest
- Kerikeri Central
- Kerikeri South
- Ōhaeawai-Waimate North
- Puketona-Waitangi
- Ngāpuhi
- Kaikohe
- Pakaraka
- Haruru
- Russell
- Paihia
- Mataraua Forest
- Matawaia-Taumarere
- Russell Peninsula
- Opua (Far North District)
- Russell Forest-Rawhiti
- Moerewa
- Kawakawa
- Maromaku

==== Whangārei District ====
- Mangakahia-Hūkerenui
- Whangaruru
- Inlets other Whangārei District
- Matarau
- Hikurangi
- Kauri
- Maungatapere
- Kamo West
- Matapouri-Tutukaka
- Kiripaka
- Kamo East
- Granfield Reserve
- Kamo Central
- Whau Valley
- Tikipunga North
- Pukenui
- Otangarei
- Tikipunga South
- Kensington (Whangārei District)
- Abbey Caves-Glenbervie
- Mairtown
- Maunu-Horahora
- Woodhill-Vinetown
- Whangārei Central
- Riverside
- Raumanga
- Tarewa
- Morningside (Whangārei District)
- Ngunguru
- Otaika-Portland
- Oakleigh-Mangapai
- Port-Limeburners
- Pataua
- Onerahi Park
- Sherwood Rise
- Onerahi
- Inlet Whangārei Harbour
- Parua Bay
- Bream Bay
- Marsden Bay
- Ruakaka
- Bream Head
- Waipu

==== Kaipara District ====
- Kaipara Coastal
- Maungaru
- Dargaville
- Ruawai-Matakohe
- Otamatea (Kaipara District)
- Maungaturoto
- Kaiwaka
- Mangawhai Rural
- Mangawhai Heads
- Inlet Mangawhai Harbour
- Mangawhai

=== Auckland Council ===
==== Rodney Area ====
- Okahukura Peninsula
- Cape Rodney
- Wellsford
- Inlet Kaipara Harbour South
- Oceanic Auckland Region East
- South Head
- Kaipara Hills
- Dome Valley-Matakana
- Oceanic Auckland Region West
- Warkworth West
- Puhoi Valley
- Warkworth East
- Sandspit
- Tawharanui Peninsula
- Te Kuru
- Snells Beach
- Parakai
- Helensville Rural
- Helensville
- Algies Bay-Scotts Landing
- Inlets other Auckland
- Waitoki
- Waikoukou Valley
- Waipatukahu
- Dairy Flat North
- Dairy Flat West
- Riverhead Forest
- Waimauku
- Gulf Islands
- Muriwai
- Kumeū Rural West
- Kumeū-Huapai
- Muriwai Valley-Bethells Beach
- Tindalls-Matakatia
- Coatesville
- Dairy Flat South
- Kumeū Rural East
- Riverhead

==== Hibiscus and Bays Area ====
- Wainui-Waiwera
- Hatfields Beach
- Orewa North
- Orewa South
- Orewa Central
- Millwater North
- Millwater South
- Kingsway
- Silverdale Central (Auckland)
- Red Beach West
- Red Beach East
- Silverdale South (Auckland)
- Vipond
- Stanmore Bay West
- Whangaparāoa Central
- Stanmore Bay East
- Manly West
- Gulf Harbour North
- Manly East
- Army Bay
- Gulf Harbour South
- Okura Bush
- Long Bay
- Awaruku
- Torbay
- Glamorgan
- Waiake
- Northcross
- Browns Bay - South West, Central, South East
- Rothesay Bay
- Murrays Bay - West, East
- Mairangi Bay - North, South
- Campbells Bay

==== Upper Harbour Area ====
- Albany Heights
- Fairview Heights
- Albany Central
- Albany West
- Oteha East
- Oteha West
- Albany South
- Paremoremo East
- Pinehill
- North Harbour
- Unsworth Heights West
- Unsworth Heights East
- Schnapper Rock
- Whenuapai
- Greenhithe West
- Greenhithe East
- Hobsonville
- Inlet Waitemata Harbour
- Hobsonville Point

==== Kaipatiki Area ====
- Totara Vale North
- Totara Vale South
- Bayview East
- Bayview West
- Bayview South
- Wairau Valley
- Glenfield North
- Glenfield West
- Glenfield South West
- Birkdale North
- Birkdale South
- Birkenhead North
- Birkenhead West
- Hillcrest North (Auckland)
- Hillcrest West (Auckland)
- Hillcrest East (Auckland)
- Chatswood
- Beach Haven East
- Beach Haven South
- Glenfield Central
- Glenfield East
- Northcote Central (Auckland)
- Akoranga
- Northcote South (Auckland)
- Birkenhead South
- Northcote Tuff Crater
- Northcote Point (Auckland)

==== Devonport-Takapuna Area ====
- Sunnynook - South, North
- Forrest Hill - North, West, East
- Castor Bay
- Milford West
- Westlake
- Milford Central
- Takapuna - West, Central, South
- Hauraki
- Cheltenham
- Belmont (Auckland)
- Bayswater
- Narrow Neck
- Stanley Point
- Devonport

==== Great Barrier Area ====
- Barrier Islands

==== Waiheke Area ====
- Oneroa East-Palm Beach
- Bays Waiheke Island
- Surfdale
- Ostend
- Onetangi
- Waiheke East
- Oneroa West

==== Henderson Massey Area ====
- Massey East
- Massey South
- Ranui North
- Te Atatu Peninsula North West
- Royal Heights South
- Te Atatu Peninsula Central
- Ranui Domain
- Te Atatu Peninsula West
- Henderson Lincoln West
- Ranui South East
- Ranui South West
- Henderson Lincoln East
- Te Atatu Peninsula East
- Henderson Lincoln South
- Summerland South
- Summerland North
- Te Atatu South-Edmonton
- Henderson North
- Western Heights (Auckland)
- Te Atatu South-Central
- Henderson Central
- Te Atatu South-McLeod North
- Henderson North East
- Henderson East
- Te Atatu South-McLeod South
- Glendene North
- Glendene South
- McLaren Park

==== Waitākere Ranges Area ====
- Sunnyvale West-Parrs Park
- Sunnyvale East
- Glen Eden West
- Glen Eden Rosier
- Glen Eden North
- Glen Eden Woodglen
- Glen Eden Central
- Oratia
- Konini
- Henderson Valley
- Piha
- Waiatarua
- Henderson Valley Park
- Waitakere Ranges South
- Henderson Larnoch
- Waima-Woodlands Park
- Kaurilands
- Titirangi South
- Laingholm

==== Waitematā Area ====
- Herne Bay
- Westmere North
- Saint Marys Bay
- Westmere South-Western Springs
- Ponsonby West
- Ponsonby East
- Wynyard-Viaduct
- Grey Lynn North
- Freemans Bay
- Grey Lynn West
- Victoria Park
- Hobson Ridge North
- Grey Lynn Central
- Queen Street
- Quay Street-Customs Street
- Hobson Ridge Central
- Grey Lynn East
- Hobson Ridge South
- Shortland Street
- Queen Street South West
- Karangahape
- Anzac Avenue
- Auckland-University
- The Strand
- Symonds Street North West
- Symonds Street West
- Symonds Street East
- Eden Terrace
- Grafton
- Parnell West
- Parnell East
- Newmarket

==== Whau Area ====
- Rosebank Peninsula
- Kelston North
- Avondale Rosebank
- Kelston South
- Avondale West (Auckland)
- Avondale North (Auckland)
- Avondale Central (Auckland)
- Fruitvale
- New Lynn North
- New Lynn North West
- New Lynn Central
- Avondale South (Auckland)
- New Lynn Seabrook
- West Lynn
- New Lynn Central South
- New Lynn South
- New Windsor North
- Glenavon
- Blockhouse Bay North
- Green Bay North
- Wesley West
- Green Bay South
- New Windsor South
- Blockhouse Bay North East
- Blockhouse Bay South
- Blockhouse Bay East

==== Albert-Eden Area ====
- Point Chevalier West
- Point Chevalier East
- Waterview
- Mount Albert West
- Mount Albert North
- Morningside (Auckland)
- Mount Albert Central
- Kingsland
- Mount Albert South
- St Lukes
- Owairaka West
- Eden Park
- Sandringham North
- Owairaka East
- Eden Valley
- Sandringham Central
- Sandringham West
- Mount Eden North East
- Mount Eden North
- Balmoral
- Sandringham East
- Mount Eden West
- Wesley South
- Wesley East
- Mount Eden East
- Maungawhau
- Mount Eden South
- Mount St John
- Greenlane North

==== Puketepapa Area ====
- Lynfield North
- Mount Roskill North
- Mount Roskill White Swan
- Mount Roskill Central North
- Three Kings West
- Mount Roskill Central South
- Lynfield South
- Three Kings East
- Mount Roskill South
- Hillsborough North
- Hillsborough West
- Waikowhai North
- Waikowhai South
- Royal Oak West
- Hillsborough East
- Hillsborough South

==== Ōrākei Area ====
- Epsom North
- Orakei West
- Remuera West
- Remuera Waitaramoa
- Orakei East
- Epsom Central-North
- Epsom Central-South
- Remuera North
- Remuera South
- Mission Bay
- Epsom East
- Remuera Waiata
- Epsom South
- Kohimarama
- Meadowbank West
- Remuera East
- Saint Heliers West
- Saint Heliers North
- Remuera Abbotts Park
- Meadowbank East
- Ellerslie Central
- Saint Heliers South
- Saint Johns West
- Greenlane South
- Oranga
- Te Papapa
- Remuera Waiatarua
- Glendowie North
- Ellerslie West
- Ellerslie East
- Saint Johns East
- Ellerslie South
- Glendowie South
- Stonefields West
- Stonefields East

==== Maungakiekie-Tāmaki Area ====
- Inlet Manukau Harbour
- One Tree Hill
- Royal Oak East
- Onehunga West
- Onehunga North
- Glen Innes West
- Onehunga Central
- Onehunga-Te Papapa Industrial
- Mount Wellington North West
- Panmure Glen Innes Industrial
- Glen Innes East-Wai O Taiki Bay
- Point England
- Penrose
- Mount Wellington North East
- Mount Wellington Ferndale
- Mount Wellington East
- Mount Wellington West
- Panmure West
- Tāmaki
- Panmure East
- Mount Wellington Central
- Sylvia Park
- Mount Wellington Industrial
- Mount Wellington South West
- Mount Wellington South East

==== Howick Area ====
- Farm Cove
- Eastern Beach
- Bucklands Beach North
- Half Moon Bay West
- Sunnyhills West-Pakuranga North
- Bucklands Beach Central
- Half Moon Bay North East
- Pakuranga West
- Sunnyhills East
- Half Moon Bay South East
- Bucklands Beach South
- Pakuranga Central
- Howick West
- Pakuranga Heights North West
- Mellons Bay
- Pakuranga Heights East
- Pakuranga Heights South West
- Howick Central
- Highland Park (Auckland)
- Botany Downs West
- East Tāmaki
- Howick East
- Burswood
- Botany Downs East
- Golflands
- Cockle Bay
- Northpark North
- Somerville
- Northpark South
- Shelly Park
- Huntington Park
- Botany Central
- Botany North
- Redcastle
- Botany East
- Botany South
- Chapel Downs
- Mission Heights North
- Donegal Park
- Ormiston North
- Ormiston South
- Mission Heights South
- Hilltop (Auckland)
- Ormiston East
- Tuscany Heights

==== Māngere-Otahuhu Area ====
- Māngere Bridge Ambury
- Māngere Bridge
- Māngere Mountain View
- Auckland Airport
- Favona North
- Sutton Park
- Otahuhu East
- Māngere South
- Harania South
- Otahuhu South West
- Māngere Mascot
- Māngere North
- Favona West
- Māngere West
- Favona East
- Otahuhu Industrial
- Harania North
- Otahuhu Central
- Māngere Central
- Otahuhu North
- Massey Road West
- Otahuhu South
- Massey Road North
- Massey Road South
- Māngere South East
- Dannemora North
- East Tāmaki Heights
- Dannemora South
- Baverstock

==== Otara-Papatoetoe Area ====
- Middlemore
- Grange
- Aorere North
- Māngere East
- Otara West
- Aorere Central
- Papatoetoe North
- Dingwall
- Aorere South
- Otara Central
- Papatoetoe West
- Papatoetoe Central
- Otara East
- Manukau Central
- Papatoetoe East
- Otara South
- Ferguson
- Papatoetoe South West
- Papatoetoe South
- Botany Junction
- Rongomai West
- Rongomai East
- Puhinui North
- Puhinui South
- Puhinui East
- Wiri West
- Clover Park North
- Clover Park South

==== Manurewa Area ====
- Wiri East
- Goodwood Heights
- Clendon Park North
- Burbank
- Totara Heights
- Homai East
- Homai West
- The Gardens (Auckland)
- Clendon Park West
- Hillpark North
- Clendon Park East
- Manurewa Central
- Rowandale West
- Rowandale East
- Weymouth North
- Hillpark South
- Randwick Park East
- Randwick Park West
- Alfriston
- Weymouth East
- Leabank
- Weymouth South
- Manurewa East
- Wattle Downs West
- Wattle Downs North
- Wattle Downs East
- Manurewa South

==== Papakura Area ====
- Takanini North
- Takanini Industrial
- Conifer Grove West
- Conifer Grove East
- Takanini West
- Takanini South
- Takanini Central
- Takanini South East
- Papakura West
- Papakura North
- Pahurehure
- Papakura Central
- Papakura North East
- Karaka Lakes
- Papakura Kelvin
- Papakura Massey Park
- Rosehill
- Papakura East
- Opaheke
- Papakura Industrial
- Red Hill
- Hingaia

==== Franklin Area ====
- Sunkist Bay
- Te Puru
- Turanga
- Clarks Beach
- Maraetai
- Karaka Creek
- Kingseat-Karaka
- Ardmore
- Patumāhoe Rural
- Patumāhoe
- Glenbrook
- Kawakawa Bay-Orere
- Clevedon
- Āwhitu
- Drury
- Tamakae
- Hamilton Estate
- Drury Rural
- Waiuku Central
- Waiuku East
- Kendallvale
- Puni
- Ramarama
- Hunua
- Pukekohe North West
- Anselmi Ridge
- Pukekohe West
- Cape Hill
- Rosa Birch Park
- Rooseville Park
- Cloverlea (Auckland)
- Pukekohe Central
- Pukekohe Hospital
- Buckland
- Bombay Hills
- Ararimu

=== Waikato Region ===
==== Coromandel Peninsula ====
- Colville
- Islands Thames-Coromandel District
- Coromandel
- Inlets Thames-Coromandel District
- Mercury Bay North
- Whitianga North
- Whitianga South
- Thames Coast
- Cooks Beach-Ferry Landing
- Mercury Bay South
- Kauaeranga
- Thames North
- Thames Central
- Thames South
- Hikuai
- Totora-Kopu
- Tairua
- Pauanui
- Matatoki-Puriri
- Whangamata Rural
- Whangamata

==== Hauraki District ====
- Miranda-Pukorokoro
- Hauraki Plains North
- Hauraki Plains East
- Ngatea
- Hauraki Plains South
- Paeroa Rural
- Paeroa
- Waihi Rural
- Waihi North
- Waihi East
- Waihi South

==== Waikato District ====
- Aka Aka
- Mangatangi
- Tuakau Rural
- Tuakau North
- Onewhero
- Pokeno Rural
- Tuakau South
- Port Waikato-Waikaretu
- Pokeno
- Pukekawa
- Maramarua
- Rangiriri
- Te Akau
- Inlets Waikato District
- Te Kauwhata
- Te Kauwhata West
- Huntly Rural
- Waerenga
- Huntly West
- Huntly East
- Raglan
- Whale Bay
- Whitikahu
- Te Uku
- Taupiri-Lake Kainui
- Ngāruawāhia North
- Ngāruawāhia Central
- Ngāruawāhia South
- Kainui-Gordonton
- Te Kowhai
- Whatawhata West
- Horotiu
- Horsham Downs
- Whatawhata East
- Rotokauri
- Hamilton Park
- Eureka-Tauwhare
- Tamahere North
- Pukemoremore
- Tamahere South

==== Matamata Piako District ====
- Tahuna-Mangateparu
- Mangaiti
- Tatuanui
- Tahuroa
- Morrinsville East
- Morrinsville West
- Te Aroha East
- Te Aroha West
- Waihou-Manawaru
- Waitoa-Ngarua
- Richmond Downs-Wardville
- Waharoa-Peria
- Okauia
- Hinuera
- Matamata North
- Matamata South
- Te Poi

==== Hamilton City ====
- Te Rapa North
- Flagstaff North
- Rotokauri-Waiwhakareke
- Flagstaff South
- Rototuna North
- Pukete West
- Flagstaff East
- Rototuna Central
- Pukete East
- Te Manatu
- Rototuna South
- Te Rapa South
- Saint Andrews West
- Saint Andrews East
- Queenwood (Hamilton City)
- St James
- Crawshaw
- Huntington
- Western Heights (Hamilton City)
- Nawton West
- Nawton East
- Chartwell
- Forest Lake (Hamilton City)
- Chedworth
- Beerescourt
- Miropiko
- Porritt
- Dinsdale North
- Maeroa
- Dinsdale South
- Fairfield (Hamilton City)
- Whitiora
- Enderley North
- Fairview Downs
- Temple View
- Swarbrick
- Kahikatea
- Frankton Junction
- Kirikiriroa
- Enderley South
- Ruakura
- Claudelands
- Hamilton Central
- Hamilton Lake
- Peachgrove
- Hamilton East Village
- Hamilton West
- Greensboro
- Hamilton East Cook
- Melville North
- Hamilton East
- Melville South
- Deanwell
- Bader
- Hillcrest West (Hamilton City)
- Hillcrest East (Hamilton City)
- Silverdale (Hamilton City)
- Glenview
- Resthill
- Fitzroy
- Riverlea
- Peacockes

==== Waipa District ====
- Te Pahu
- Ngāhinapōuri
- Lake Cameron
- Lake Ngaroto
- Kaipaki
- Pirongia
- Hautapu Rural
- Pokuru
- Te Rahu
- Fencourt
- Hautapu
- Karapiro
- Cambridge North
- Cambridge West
- Cambridge East
- Cambridge Park-River Garden
- Oaklands-St Kilda
- Pukerimu
- Cambridge Central
- Te Awamutu North
- Te Awamutu West
- Leamington West
- Goodfellow Park
- Leamington South
- Leamington Central
- Leamington East
- Te Awamutu Stadium
- Te Awamutu Central
- Pekerau
- Fraser Street
- Sherwin Park
- St Leger
- Rotoorangi
- Tokanui
- Kihikihi Central
- Maungatautari
- Rotongata

==== Otorohanga District ====
- Inlets Otorohanga District
- Pirongia Forest
- Honikiwi
- Te Kawa
- Otorohanga
- Maihiihi
- Puniu

==== South Waikato District ====
- Tirau
- Putararu Rural
- Putararu
- Kinleith
- Paraonui
- Parkdale
- Matarawa
- Stanley Park
- Strathmore (South Waikato District)
- Tokoroa Central
- Moananui

==== Waitomo District ====
- Inlet Waitomo District
- Herangi
- Hangatiki
- Aria
- Te Kuiti West
- Te Kuiti East
- Waipa Valley
- Tiroa

==== Taupō District ====
- Marotiri
- Ohakuri
- Lake Taupo Bays
- Mapara
- Inland water Lake Taupō
- Wairakei-Broadlands
- Acacia Bay
- Brentwood (Taupō District)
- Nukuhau-Rangatira Park
- Taupō Central West
- Tauhara
- Taupō Central East
- Mountview
- Bird Area
- Hilltop (Taupō District)
- Waipahihi
- Richmond Heights
- Wharewaka
- Kaimanawa
- Waitahanui
- Turangi
- Rangataiki
- Taharua
- Te More
- Waiau

=== Bay of Plenty Region ===
==== Western Bay of Plenty District ====
- Waihi Beach-Bowentown
- Tahawai
- Athenree
- Aongatete
- Katikati
- Inlet Tauranga Harbour North
- Matakana Island
- Pahoia
- Omokoroa
- Omokoroa Rural
- Te Puna
- Minden
- Kaimai
- Kopurererua
- Kaitemako (Western Bay of Plenty District)
- Waiorohi
- Otawa
- Te Puke West
- Rangiuru
- Te Puke East
- Inlets Maketu
- Maketu
- Pukehina Beach
- Pongakawa

==== Tauranga City ====
- Matua North
- Inlet Tauranga Harbour South
- Mount Maunganui North
- Matua South
- Bethlehem North
- Bellevue
- Otumoetai North
- Otumoetai South
- Brookfield West
- Bethlehem Central
- Brookfield East
- Mount Maunganui South
- Tauranga Central
- Mount Maunganui Central
- Judea
- Te Reti
- Bethlehem South
- Omanu Beach
- Tauranga Hospital
- Tauriko
- Gate Pa
- Greerton South
- Tauranga South
- Arataki North
- Matapihi
- Pyes Pa West
- Greerton North
- Yatton Park
- Pyes Pa North
- Arataki South
- Pyes Pa South
- Poike
- Te Maunga North
- Maungatapu
- Hairini
- Pyes Pa East
- Te Maunga South
- Kaitemako
- Ōhauiti
- Baypark-Kairua
- Welcome Bay West
- Welcome Bay East
- Pacific View
- Welcome Bay South
- Palm Beach North
- Palm Beach South-Gravatt
- Papamoa Beach North
- Doncaster
- Papamoa Beach South
- Motiti
- Wairakei

==== Rotorua District ====
- Tui Ridge
- Arahiwi
- Ngongotahā Valley
- Hamurana
- Ngongotahā East
- Ngongotahā West
- Inland water Lake Rotorua
- Ngongotahā South
- Selwyn Heights
- Pleasant Heights
- Rotoiti-Rotoehu
- Kawaha
- Fairy Springs
- Western Heights (Rotorua District)
- Pukehangi North
- Pukehangi South
- Mangakakahi Central
- Koutu
- Mangakakahi West
- Sunnybrook
- Fordlands
- Kuirau
- Utuhina
- Pomare
- Rotorua Central
- Hillcrest (Rotorua District)
- Victoria
- Waiohewa
- Glenholme North
- Springfield South
- Springfield North
- Glenholme South
- Owhata West
- Holdens Bay-Rotokawa
- Ngapuna
- Fenton Park
- Tihiotonga-Whakarewarewa
- Owhata East
- Lynmore
- Ngakuru
- Kaingaroa-Whakarewarewa
- Golden Springs

==== Whakatane District ====
- Manawahe
- Matatā-Otakiri
- Onepu Spring
- Edgecumbe
- Thornton-Awakeri
- Te Teko Lakes
- Coastlands
- Whakatāne West
- Whakatāne Central
- Trident
- Allandale
- Mokorua Bush
- Wainui
- Ōhope
- Inlet Ōhiwa Harbour West
- Galatea
- Waingarara-Waimana
- Murupara

==== Kawerau District ====
- Monika Reserve
- Kawerau Industrial
- Tarawera Park

==== Opotiki District ====
- Inlet Ōhiwa Harbour East
- Waiotahi
- Cape Runaway
- Woodlands
- Opotiki
- Otara-Tirohanga
- Oponae

=== Gisborne Region ===
==== Gisborne District ====
- East Cape
- Waipaoa
- Ruatoria-Raukumara
- Tokomaru
- Hangaroa
- Wharekaka
- Te Arai
- Hexton
- Lytton
- Makaraka-Awapuni
- Riverdale
- Te Hapara North
- Mangapapa North
- Elgin
- Te Hapara South
- Mangapapa East
- Mangapapa South
- Te Hapara East
- Centennial Crescent
- Whataupoko East
- Whataupoko West
- Gisborne Central
- Kaiti North
- Kaiti South
- Outer Kaiti
- Tamarau
- Wainui-Okitu

=== Hawke's Bay Region ===
==== Wairoa District ====
- Maungataniwha-Raupunga
- Inland water Lake Waikaremoana
- Frasertown-Ruakituri
- Whakaki
- Wairoa
- Māhia

==== Hastings District ====
- Puketitiri-Tutira
- Sherenden-Crownthorpe
- Maraekakaho
- Puketapu-Eskdale
- Omahu-Pakowhai
- Bridge Pa
- Twyford
- Poukawa
- Flaxmere West
- Omahu Strip
- Lochain Park
- Flaxmere Park
- Flaxmere South
- Irongate
- Frimley
- Camberley
- Clive
- St Leonards
- Mahora
- Raureka
- Cornwall Park
- Tomoana
- Longlands-Pukahu
- Raceway Park
- Karamu
- Hastings Central
- Tomoana Crossing
- Akina Park
- Queens Square
- Mayfair
- Parkhaven
- Parkvale
- Mangateretere
- Haumoana-Te Awanga
- Lucknow
- Karanema-St Hill
- Havelock North-Central
- Brookvale
- Iona
- Hereworth
- Te Mata Hills
- Havelock Hills
- Kahuranaki

==== Napier City ====
- Bay View
- Poraiti Hills
- Poraiti Flat
- Westshore
- Inlet Napier City
- Onekawa West
- Ahuriri
- Taradale West
- Greenmeadows West
- Taradale South
- Bluff Hill
- Hospital Hill
- Tamatea West
- Tamatea North
- Taradale Central
- Tamatea East
- Marewa West
- Greenmeadows Central
- Onekawa Central
- Pirimai West
- Napier Central
- Greenmeadows South
- Nelson Park
- Bledisloe Park
- Pirimai East
- Onekawa East
- Tareha Reserve
- Marewa East
- Onekawa South
- McLean Park
- Maraenui
- Meeanee-Awatoto

==== Central Hawke's Bay District ====
- Mangaonuku
- Makaretu
- Waipawa
- Waipukurau West
- Mangarara
- Waipukurau East
- Taurekaitai

=== Taranaki Region ===
==== New Plymouth District ====
- Port Taranaki
- Spotswood
- Omata
- Ōakura
- Moturoa
- Kaitake
- Blagdon-Lynmouth
- Kawaroa
- New Plymouth Central
- Marfell
- Whalers Gate
- Strandon
- Westown
- Bell Block West
- Bell Block East
- Waiwhakaiho-Bell Block South
- Lower Vogeltown
- Hurdon
- Frankleigh Park
- Merrilands
- Ferndale
- Welbourn
- Fitzroy-Glen Avon
- Waitara West
- Upper Vogeltown
- Highlands Park (New Plymouth District)
- Paraite
- Waitara East
- Lepperton-Brixton
- Mangorei
- Mount Messenger
- Mangaoraka
- Tikorangi
- Everett Park
- Inglewood
- Tarata

==== Stratford District ====
- Pembroke
- Douglas
- Toko
- Stratford North
- Whangamomona
- Stratford Central
- Stratford South

==== South Taranaki District ====
- Cape Egmont
- Taungatara
- Opunake
- Kaponga-Mangatoki
- Manaia-Kapuni
- Eltham
- Okaiawa
- Te Roti-Moeroa
- Egmont Showgrounds
- Normanby-Tawhiti
- Ohangai
- Turuturu
- King Edward Park
- Ramanui
- Hāwera Central
- Mangawhio
- Manutahi-Waitotora
- Pātea

=== Manawatū-Whanganui Region ===
==== Ruapehu District ====
- Otangiwai-Ohura
- Ngapuke
- Taumarunui North
- Taumarunui Central
- Taumarunui East
- National Park
- Tangiwai
- Raetihi
- Ohakune
- Waiouru

==== Whanganui District ====
- Upper Whanganui
- Mowhanau
- Brunswick-Papaiti
- Castlecliff West
- Otamatea (Whanganui District)
- Castlecliff East
- Springvale North
- Lower Aramoho
- St Johns Hill East
- St Johns Hill West
- Titoki
- Springvale West
- Springvale East
- Upper Aramoho
- Balgownie
- Laird Park
- Wembley Park
- College Estate
- Whanganui East-Williams Domain
- Gonville West
- Gonville North
- Cornmarket
- Whanganui East-Riverlands
- Kaitoke-Fordell
- Whanganui Central
- Gonville South
- Bastia-Durie Hill
- Putiki

==== Rangitikei District ====
- Mokai Patea
- Ngamatea
- Turakina
- Otairi
- Taihape
- Marton Rural
- Marton North
- Parewanui
- Marton South
- Bulls

==== Manawatū District ====
- Kiwitea
- Tokorangi
- Ohakea-Sanson
- Oroua Downs
- Awahuri
- Pohangina-Āpiti
- Mount Taylor
- Taikorea
- Makino
- Sandon
- Kimbolton North
- Warwick
- Kimbolton West
- Feilding Central
- Kimbolton South
- Kauwhata
- Taonui

==== Palmerston North City ====
- Newbury
- Palmerston North Airport Statistical Area
- Milson North
- Cloverlea (Palmerston North City)
- Tremaine
- Milson South
- Whakarongo
- Westbrook
- Takaro North
- Pioneer West
- Palmerston North Hospital Statistical Area
- Highbury East
- Park West
- Takaro South
- Roslyn (Palmerston North City)
- Kelvin Grove West
- Kelvin Grove North
- Papaioea North
- Palmerston North Central
- Awapuni North
- Terrace End
- Maraetarata
- Papaioea South
- Royal Oak (Palmerston North City)
- West End
- Awapuni South
- Milverton
- Ruamahanga
- Esplanade
- Hokowhitu Central
- Hokowhitu East
- Turitea
- Ruahine
- Linton Camp
- Ashhurst
- Hokowhitu South
- Aokautere
- Pihauatua
- Aokautere Rural
- Poutoa

==== Tararua District ====
- Norsewood
- Papatawa
- Mangatainoka
- Woodville
- Dannevirke West
- Dannevirke East
- Waitahora
- Kaitawa
- Pahiatua
- Nireaha-Eketāhuna
- Owhanga
- Mara

==== Horowhenua District ====
- Kere Kere
- Foxton Beach
- Foxton North
- Foxton South
- Waitarere
- Waikawa
- Miranui
- Donnelly Park
- Ōhau-Manakau
- Kawiu South
- Makomako
- Kawiu North
- Levin Central
- Tararua
- Shannon
- Queenwood
- Playford Park
- Fairfield
- Taitoko
- Waiopehu
- Makahika
- Kimberley
- Kapiti Island
- Otaki Beach

=== Wellington Region ===
==== Kāpiti Coast District ====
- Forest Lakes, Wellington
- Otaki
- Te Horo
- Waitohu
- Waikanae Beach
- Peka Peka
- Paraparaumu Beach North
- Paraparaumu Beach West
- Waikanae Park
- Paraparaumu Beach East
- Otaihanga
- Paraparaumu North
- Waikanae West
- Otaki Forks
- Paraparaumu Central
- Maungakotukutuku
- Raumati Beach West
- Waikanae East
- Tararua Forest Park
- Raumati Beach East
- Paraparaumu East
- Raumati South
- Paekākāriki

==== Porirua City ====
- Mana Island
- Pukerua Bay
- Paekākāriki Hill
- Plimmerton
- Titahi Bay North
- Titahi Bay South
- Elsdon-Takapuwahia
- Pāuatahanui
- Onepoto
- Camborne
- Inlet Porirua Harbour
- Paremata
- Porirua Central
- Papakowhai
- Aotea
- Postgate
- Ascot Park
- Whitby
- Porirua East
- Endeavour
- Cannons Creek North
- Waitangirua Tairangi
- Waitangirua Corinna
- Ranui Heights
- Cannons Creek East
- Cannons Creek South

==== Upper Hutt City ====
- Akatarawa
- Riverstone Terraces
- Heretaunga
- Birchville-Brown Owl
- Poets Block
- Brentwood
- Silverstream
- Elderslea
- Trentham North
- Totara Park
- Trentham South
- Mangaroa
- Ebdentown
- Wallaceville
- Māoribank
- Te Marua
- Pinehaven
- Clouston Park
- Upper Hutt Central

==== Lower Hutt City ====
- Belmont Park
- Maungaraki
- Korokoro
- Kelson
- Normandale
- Belmont (Lower Hutt City)
- Petone Central
- Tirohanga
- Manor Park
- Alicetown-Melling
- Taita North
- Boulcott
- Hutt Central North
- Avalon West
- Stokes Valley Central
- Taita South
- Petone East
- Hutt Central South
- Stokes Valley North
- Petone Esplanade
- Epuni West
- Avalon East
- Woburn
- Naenae Central
- Waterloo West
- Epuni East
- Gracefield
- Moera
- Delaney
- Waiwhetu
- Waterloo East
- Naenae North
- Manuka
- Naenae South
- Towai
- Arakura
- Eastern Bays
- Pencarrow
- Wainuiomata West
- Glendale
- Wainuiomata Central
- Eastbourne
- Homedale East
- Homedale West

==== Wellington City ====
- Makara-Ohariu
- Tawa North
- Linden
- Tawa South
- Tawa Central
- Grenada North
- Churton Park North
- Takapu-Horokiwi
- Churton Park South
- Johnsonville West
- Grenada Village
- Johnsonville North
- Paparangi
- Ngaio North
- Johnsonville Central
- Broadmeadows
- Crofton Downs
- Johnsonville South
- Khandallah Reserve
- Karori Park
- Newlands North
- Ngaio South
- Newlands South
- Woodridge
- Karori North
- Khandallah North
- Wilton
- Khandallah South
- Wadestown
- Karori South
- Onslow
- Karori East
- Pipitea-Kaiwharawhara
- Northland (Wellington City)
- Thorndon
- Wellington Botanic Gardens
- Kelburn
- Aro Valley
- Wellington University
- Wellington Central
- Brooklyn North
- Dixon Street
- Vivian West
- Courtenay
- Brooklyn East
- Mount Cook West
- Vivian East
- Brooklyn South
- Oriental Bay
- Mount Cook East
- Mount Victoria
- Roseneath
- Owhiro Bay
- Kinsgton-Mornington-Vogeltown
- Newtown North
- Newtown West
- Hataitai North
- Evans Bay
- Berhampore
- Hataitai South
- Maupuia
- Newtown South
- Kilbirnie Central
- Island Bay West
- Melrose
- Island Bay East
- Miramar North
- Kilbirnie East
- Lyall Bay
- Miramar Central
- Southgate
- Karaka Bay-Worser Bay
- Houghton Bay
- Miramar East
- Miramar South
- Rongotai
- Strathmore (Wellington City)
- Seatoun

==== Masterton District ====
- Kōpuaranga
- Upper Plain
- Opaki
- Ngaumutawa
- Solway North
- Lansdowne West
- Masterton Central
- Kuripuni
- Douglas Park
- Solway South
- Lansdowne East
- Cameron and Soldiers Park
- Whareama
- Homebush-Te Ore Ore
- McJorrow Park

==== Carteron District ====
- Mount Holdsworth
- Carterton North
- Kokotau
- Carterton South
- Gladstone

==== South Wairarapa District ====
- Tauherenikau
- Kahutara
- Featherston
- Inland water Lake Wairarapa
- Greytown
- Aorangi Forest
- Martinborough

=== Others ===
==== North Island offshore ====
- Oceanic Three Kings Islands
- Three Kings Islands
- Oceanic Northland Region
- Inlet Doubtless Bay
- Inlet Kaipara Harbour North
- Oceanic Waikato Region East
- Inlets Waikato Region
- Oceanic Waikato Region West
- Oceanic Bay of Plenty Region
- Islands Bay of Plenty Region
- Oceanic Taranaki Region
- Inlet Port Taranaki
- Oceanic Gisborne Region
- Oceanic Manawatū-Wanganui Region West
- Oceanic Hawke's Bay Region
- Inlet Port Napier
- Oceanic Wellington Region
- Inlet Wellington Harbour
- Bare Island
- Oceanic Manawatū-Wanganui Region East
- Oceanic Tasman Region

== South Island ==
=== Tasman Region ===
==== Tasman District ====
- Golden Bay/Mohua
- Inlets Golden Bay
- Tākaka
- Pohara-Abel Tasman
- Tākaka Hills
- Kaiteriteri-Riwaka
- Upper Moutere
- Lower Moutere
- Motueka North
- Motueka West
- Motueka East
- Inlets Motueka
- Golden Downs
- Moutere Hills
- Ruby Bay-Māpua
- Murchison-Nelson Lakes
- Inlet Waimea West
- Islands Tasman District
- Waimea West
- Appleby
- Wakefield
- Richmond West
- Wakefield Rural
- Brightwater
- Hope
- Richmond Central
- Ben Cooper Park
- Richmond South
- Wilkes Park
- Templemore
- Easby Park
- Fairose
- Aniseed Valley

=== Nelson Region ===
==== Nelson City ====
- Nelson Rural
- Inlets Nelson City
- Marybank
- Port Nelson
- Nelson Airport
- Tahunanui
- Britannia
- Atawhai
- Broadgreen-Monaco
- Washington
- Tahuna Hills
- Nelson Central-Trafalgar
- The Wood
- Toi Toi
- Nayland
- Aldinga
- Victory
- Rutherford
- Maitlands
- Maitai
- Grampians
- Saxton
- Suffolk
- Omaio
- Enner Glynn
- Daelyn
- The Brook

=== Marlborough Region ===
==== Marlborough District ====
- Marlborough Sounds West
- Marlborough Sounds Coastal Marine
- Marlborough Sounds East
- Upper Wairau
- Waikawa (Marlborough District)
- Waitohi (Marlborough District)
- Tuamarina
- Awatere
- Renwick
- Lower Wairau
- Woodbourne
- Spring Creek-Grovetown
- Springlands
- Yelverton
- Mayfield
- Whitney West
- Blenheim Central
- Riversdale-Islington
- Whitney East
- Redwoodtown West
- Witherlea West
- Redwoodtown East
- Riverlands
- Witherlea East
- Inlet Wairau River

=== West Coast Region ===
==== Buller District ====
- Karamea
- Inlets Buller District
- Westport North
- Westport Rural
- Westport South
- Buller Coalfields
- Charleston (Buller District)
- Inangahua
- Reefton

==== Grey District ====
- Barrytown
- Runanga
- Cobden
- Blaketown
- Greymouth Central
- King Park
- Marsden
- Karoro
- Rutherglen-Camerons
- Greymouth Rural
- Dobson
- Nelson Creek
- Lake Brunner

==== Westland District ====
- Haast
- Westland Glaciers-Bruce Bay
- Arahura-Kumara
- Hokitika
- Inlets Westland District
- Hokitika Rural
- Waitaha
- Whataroa-Harihari
- Hokitika Valley-Otira

=== Canterbury Region ===
==== Kaikōura District ====
- Kaikōura Ranges
- Kaikōura

==== Hurunui District ====
- Hanmer Range
- Amuri
- Hanmer Springs
- Upper Hurunui
- Parnassus
- Ashley Forest
- Omihi
- Balcairn
- Amberley

==== Waimakariri District ====
- Okuku
- Ashley Gorge
- Oxford
- Starvation Hill-Cust
- Loburn
- Eyrewell
- West Eyreton
- Ashley-Sefton
- Fernside
- Rangiora North West
- Kingsbury
- Ashgrove
- Rangiora North East
- Oxford Estate
- Rangiora Central
- Rangiora South West
- Lilybrook
- Waikuku
- Mandeville-Ohoka
- Rangiora South East
- Southbrook
- Swannanoa-Eyreton
- Tuahiwi
- Woodend
- Pegasus
- Clarkville
- Pegasus Bay
- Kaiapoi North West
- Silverstream (Waimakariri District)
- Sovereign Palms
- Kaiapoi West
- Kaiapoi Central
- Kaiapoi South
- Kaiapoi East

==== Christchurch City ====
- McLeans Island
- Paparua
- Yaldhurst
- Christchurch Airport
- Clearwater
- Belfast West
- Harewood
- Brooklands-Spencerville
- Styx
- Belfast East
- Northwood
- Russley
- Regents Park
- Hawthornden
- Bishopdale North
- Casebrook
- Bishopdale West
- Templeton
- Islington
- Burnside Park
- Marshland
- Avonhead North
- Redwood North
- Broomfield
- Redwood West
- Avonhead West
- Bishopdale South
- Islington-Hornby Industrial
- Burnside
- Hei Hei
- Papanui North
- Avonhead East
- Redwood East
- Avonhead South
- Riccarton Racecourse
- Bryndwr North
- Northlands (Christchurch City)
- Papanui West
- Ilam North
- Hornby West
- Hornby Central
- Northcote (Christchurch City)
- Jellie Park
- Ilam South
- Bryndwr South
- Papanui East
- Sockburn North
- Hornby South
- Ilam University
- Prestons
- Strowan
- Fendalton
- Waitikiri
- Mairehau North
- Bush Inn
- Awatea North
- Upper Riccarton
- Malvern
- Rutland
- Sockburn South
- Deans Bush
- Wigram North
- Holmwood
- Wharenui
- Wigram West
- Awatea South
- Merivale
- Mairehau South
- Mona Vale
- Riccarton West
- Shirley West
- Middleton
- Wigram South
- Queenspark
- St Albans North
- St Albans West
- Travis Wetlands
- Wigram East
- Riccarton Central
- Oaklands West
- Riccarton South
- Halswell West
- Shirley East
- Broken Run
- St Albans East
- Hagley Park
- Hillmorton
- Parklands
- Riccarton East
- Edgeware
- Aidanfield
- Tower Junction
- Burwood
- Christchurch Central-West
- Christchurch Central-North
- Richmond North (Christchurch City)
- Waimairi Beach
- Addington West
- Otakaro-Avon River Corridor
- Oaklands East
- Addington North
- Dallington
- Christchurch Central
- Hoon Hay West
- Richmond South (Christchurch City)
- Spreydon West
- Christchurch Central-East
- Christchurch Central-South
- North Beach
- Halswell North
- Addington East
- Avondale (Christchurch City)
- Spreydon North
- Hoon Hay East
- Avonside
- Linwood West
- Halswell South
- Sydenham Central
- Spreydon South
- Rawhiti
- Wainoni
- Linwood North
- Aranui
- Sydenham West
- Lancaster Park
- Phillipstown
- Kennedys Bush
- Somerfield East
- Somerfield West
- Linwood East
- Sydenham North
- Hoon Hay South
- Charleston (Christchurch City)
- Sydenham South
- Bexley
- Waltham
- Westmorland
- Woolston North
- New Brighton
- Cashmere West
- Bromley South
- Ensors
- Beckenham
- Bromley North
- St Martins
- Opawa
- Woolston West
- Woolston East
- Huntsbury
- Cashmere East
- Hillsborough (Christchurch City)
- Woolston South
- Port Hills
- South New Brighton
- Brookhaven-Ferrymead
- Heathcote Valley
- Mount Pleasant
- Redcliffs
- Governors Bay
- Inlets other Christchurch City
- Clifton Hill
- Lyttelton
- Inlet Port Lyttelton
- Sumner
- Teddington
- Diamond Harbour
- Inland water Lake Ellesmere/Te Waihora South
- Banks Peninsula South
- Eastern Bays-Banks Peninsula
- Akaroa Harbour
- Inlet Akaroa Harbour
- Akaroa

==== Selwyn District ====
- Arthur's Pass
- Craigieburn
- Torlesse
- Glenroy-Hororata
- Glentunnel
- Darfield
- Kirwee
- Bankside
- Charing Cross
- Halkett
- Newtons Road
- West Melton
- Burnham Camp
- Rolleston Izone
- Rolleston North West
- Rolleston Central
- Rolleston North East
- Rolleston South West
- Rolleston South East
- Southbridge
- Springston
- Trents
- Prebbleton
- Irwell
- Ladbrooks
- Lincoln West
- Lincoln East
- Leeston
- Tai Tapu
- Motukarara
- Inland water Lake Ellesmere/Te Waihora North

==== Ashburton District ====
- Ashburton Lakes
- Cairnbrae
- Ashburton Forks
- Methven
- Ealing-Lowcliffe
- Eiffelton
- Chertsey
- Winchmore-Wakanui
- Allenton North
- Allenton South
- Rakaia
- Ashburton North
- Allenton East
- Tinwald North
- Ashburton Central
- Ashburton West
- Tinwald South
- Ashburton East
- Netherby
- Hampstead

==== Timaru District ====
- Ben McLeod
- Arundel
- Levels Valley
- Geraldine
- Rangitata
- Waitohi (Timaru District)
- Pleasant Point
- Temuka West
- Hadlow
- Levels
- Temuka East
- Gleniti North
- Washdyke
- Fairview
- Gleniti South
- Glenwood
- Marchwiel West
- Marchwiel East
- Highfield North
- Highfield South
- Waimataitai-Maori Hill
- Fraser Park
- Seaview
- Inlet Port Timaru
- Watlington
- Timaru Central
- Timaru East
- Parkside
- Kensington (Timaru District)

==== Mackenzie District ====
- Mackenzie Lakes
- Inland water Lake Pukaki
- Inland water Lake Tekapo
- Twizel
- Opua (Mackenzie District)
- Fairlie

==== Waimate District ====
- Hakataramea
- Maungati
- Lyalldale
- Makikihi-Willowbridge
- Waimate North
- Morven-Glenavy-Ikawai
- Waimate West
- Waimate East

=== Otago Region ===
==== Waitaki District ====
- Aviemore
- Inland water Lake Ōhau
- Danseys Pass
- Ngapara
- Lower Waitaki
- Waihemo
- Maheno
- Weston
- Oamaru North Milner Park
- Oamaru North Orana Park
- Oamaru Gardens
- Glen Warren
- Holmes Hill
- Oamaru Central
- South Hill
- Inlet Port Oamaru
- Palmerston

==== Central Otago District ====
- Lindis-Nevis Valleys
- Cromwell West
- Cromwell East
- Manuherikia-Ida Valleys
- Earnscleugh
- Dunstan-Galloway
- Clyde
- Alexandra North
- Alexandra South
- Maniototo
- Teviot Valley

==== Queenstown Lakes District ====
- Outer Wānaka
- Glenorchy
- Inland water Lake Wānaka
- Outer Wakatipu
- Inland water Lake Hāwea
- Cardrona
- Inland water Lake Wakatipu
- Wānaka Waterfront
- Wānaka North
- Wānaka West
- Albert Town
- Wānaka Central
- Lake Hāwea
- Upper Clutha Valley
- Kingston
- Arthurs Point
- Wakatipu Basin
- Queenstown Hill
- Warren Park
- Sunshine Bay-Fernhill
- Arrowtown
- Quail Rise
- Queenstown Central
- Queenstown East
- Frankton Arm
- Frankton
- Lake Hayes
- Kelvin Heights
- Shotover Country
- Lake Hayes Estate
- Jacks Point

==== Dunedin City ====
- Strath Taieri
- Bucklands Crossing
- Waikouaiti
- Momona
- Taieri
- Inlets other Dunedin City
- Mount Cargill
- Bush Road
- Mosgiel East
- Mosgiel Central
- Seddon Park
- Wingatui
- Saddle Hill-Chain Hills
- East Taieri
- Halfway Bush
- Helensburgh
- Glenleith
- Fairfield (Dunedin City)
- Inlet Otago Harbour
- Brockville
- Wakari
- Abbotsford
- Brighton
- Pine Hill-Dalmore
- Kaikorai-Bradford
- Maori Hill
- Roslyn (Dunedin City)
- North East Valley Chingford
- Roseneath-Sawyers Bay
- Normanby
- North East Valley Knox
- Belleknowes
- Gardens (Dunedin City)
- Kenmure
- Campus West
- Waldronville
- Green Island
- Port Chalmers
- Royal Terrace
- Arthur Street
- Opoho
- Campus North
- Campus South
- Mornington
- Dunedin Central
- Maryhill
- Ravensbourne-St Leonards
- Harbourside
- Fernhill
- Otago Peninsula
- Concord
- Calton Hill
- Caversham
- Hillside-Portsmouth Drive
- Kew (Dunedin City)
- Corstorphine
- Forbury
- Bathgate Park
- St Clair
- Waverley
- Macandrew Bay-Company Bay
- Broad Bay-Portobello
- St Kilda South
- Musselburgh
- Shiel Hill
- St Kilda North
- Andersons Bay
- Tainui

==== Clutha District ====
- West Otago
- Tuapeka
- Clinton
- Clutha Valley
- Bruce
- Catlins
- Milton
- Balclutha South
- Balclutha North
- Benhar-Stirling
- Kaitangata-Matau
- Inlet Catlins

=== Southland Region ===
==== Southland District ====
- Fiordland
- Inlets Fiordland
- Inland water Lake Te Anau
- Mararoa
- Inland water Lake Manapouri
- Te Anau
- Whitestone
- Mossburn
- Inland water Lake Hauroko
- Longwood Forest
- Ohai-Nightcaps
- Riversdale-Piano Flat
- Lumsden-Balfour
- Ōreti River
- Otautau
- Hedgehope
- Winton
- Waianiwa
- Riverton
- Wallacetown
- Grove Bush
- Edendale-Woodlands
- Inlets other Southland District
- Stewart Island
- Awarua Plains
- Wyndham-Catlins
- West Plains-Makarewa

==== Gore District ====
- Waikaka
- Waimumu-Kaiwera
- Gore - North, West, East, Central, Main, South
- Mataura

==== Invercargill City ====
- Prestonville-Grasmere
- Donovan Park
- Myross Bush
- Otatara
- Invercargill Central
- Gladstone (Invercargill City)
- Rosedale
- Avenal
- Hargest
- Windsor
- Richmond (Invercargill City)
- Glengarry
- Inlet New River Estuary
- Turnbull Thompson Park
- Crinan
- Georgetown
- Kew (Invercargill City)
- Kennington-Tisbury
- Newfield
- Strathern
- Elizabeth Park
- Aurora
- Moulson
- Kingswell
- Clifton
- Woodend-Greenhills
- Inlet Bluff Harbour
- Bluff

=== Others ===
==== Chatham Islands ====
- Oceanic Chatham Islands
- Chatham Islands

==== South Island offshore ====
- Oceanic West Coast Region
- Oceanic Nelson Region
- Oceanic Marlborough Region
- Oceanic Southland Region
- Oceanic Canterbury Region
- Oceanic Otago Region
- New Zealand Economic Zone
- Oceanic Kermadec Islands
- Kermadec Islands
- Oceanic Oil Rig Taranaki
- Oceanic Campbell Island
- Campbell Island
- Oceanic Oil Rig Southland
- Oceanic Auckland Islands
- Auckland Islands
- Oceanic Bounty Islands
- Bounty Islands
- Oceanic Snares Islands
- Snares Islands
- Oceanic Antipodes Islands
- Antipodes Islands
- Ross Dependency

== See also ==
- Cities in New Zealand
- List of functional urban areas in New Zealand
- List of populated places in New Zealand
