= Brooklyn North =

Brooklyn North may refer to:

- Brooklyn North, a New York City police precinct
- Brooklyn North, a district of the New York City Department of Sanitation
- Brooklyn North, a statistical area of Brooklyn, Wellington, New Zealand

== See also ==
- Brooklyn South, a television series
- Brooklyn and North River Line, a trolley route
- Brooklyn (disambiguation)
- North, a cardinal direction
