= Gleniti =

- Suburb
- Interactive map of Gleniti
- Coordinates: 44.384°S 171.197°E
- Country: New Zealand
- City: Timaru
- Local authority: Timaru District Council
- Electoral ward: Timaru

Area
  - Land: 716 ha (1,770 acres)

Population (June 2025)
  - Total: 4,240
  - Density: 592/km^{2} (1,530/sq mi)

Hadlow	Gleniti	Marchwiel
		Glenwood

Gleniti is a suburb of Timaru, in the South Canterbury district and Canterbury region of New Zealand's South Island. It is located west of the town centre.

The name is a hybrid of the Scottish term glen and the original Māori name for the area Wai-iti (which translates as little water).

Gleniti is the home of Aorangi Park, South Canterbury's main sports complex.

== Demographics ==
Gleniti covers 7.16 km^{2} (2.76 sq mi). It had an estimated population of 4,240 as of June 2025, with a population density of 592 people per km^{2}.

Historical population
Year	Pop.	±% p.a.
2006	3,204	—
2013	3,504	+1.29%
2018	3,921	+2.27%
2023	4,116	+0.98%

Gleniti had a population of 4,116 in the 2023 New Zealand census, an increase of 195 people (5.0%) since the 2018 census, and an increase of 612 people (17.5%) since the 2013 census. There were 1,977 males, 2,130 females, and 9 people of other genders in 1,656 dwellings. 1.6% of people identified as LGBTIQ+. The median age was 49.5 years (compared with 38.1 years nationally). There were 720 people (17.5%) aged under 15 years, 486 (11.8%) aged 15 to 29, 1,701 (41.3%) aged 30 to 64, and 1,206 (29.3%) aged 65 or older.

People could identify as more than one ethnicity. The results were 89.1% European (Pākehā); 6.3% Māori; 1.3% Pasifika; 7.2% Asian; 0.8% Middle Eastern, Latin American and African New Zealanders (MELAA); and 3.1% other, which includes people giving their ethnicity as "New Zealander". English was spoken by 97.7%, Māori by 0.8%, Samoan by 0.1%, and other languages by 8.2%. No language could be spoken by 1.3% (e.g. too young to talk). New Zealand Sign Language was known by 0.6%. The percentage of people born overseas was 16.2, compared with 28.8% nationally.

Religious affiliations were 44.1% Christian, 0.9% Hindu, 0.3% Islam, 0.4% Buddhist, 0.1% New Age, and 0.9% other religions. People who answered that they had no religion were 46.4%, and 6.6% of people did not answer the census question.

Of those at least 15 years old, 624 (18.4%) people had a bachelor's or higher degree, 1,983 (58.4%) had a post-high school certificate or diploma, and 783 (23.1%) people exclusively held high school qualifications. The median income was $42,300, compared with $41,500 nationally. 468 people (13.8%) earned over $100,000 compared to 12.1% nationally. The employment status of those at least 15 was 1,551 (45.7%) full-time, 468 (13.8%) part-time, and 30 (0.9%) unemployed.

Individual statistical areas
Name	Area (km^{2})	Population	Density (per km^{2})	Dwellings	Median age	Median income
Gleniti North	5.42	1,596	294	648	52.2 years	$45,500
Gleniti South	1.74	2,520	1,448	1,008	48.0 years	$40,200
New Zealand					38.1 years	$41,500

== Education ==
Gleniti School is a coeducational state full primary school (years 1-8). It had a roll of 376 students as of July 2026. It first opened in 1879.
