= Redruth, New Zealand =

Redruth
- Suburb
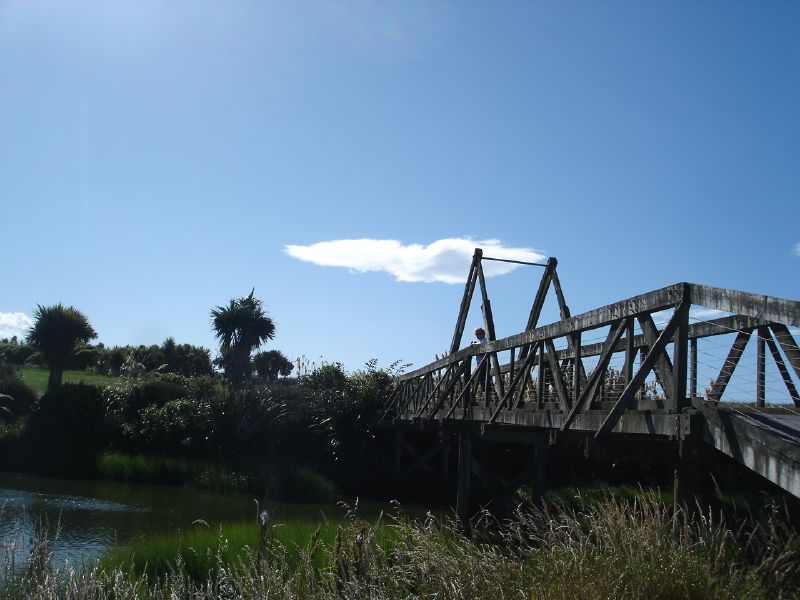
- A footbridge over Saltwater Creek
- Interactive map of Redruth
- Coordinates: 44.417°S 171.246°E
- Country: New Zealand
- City: Timaru
- Local authority: Timaru District Council
- Electoral ward: Timaru

Area
  - Land: 156 ha (390 acres)

Population (2023 census)
  - Total: 54
  - Density: 35/km^{2} (90/sq mi)

| Watlington | Kensington |
| Fairview | Redruth | (Canterbury Bight) |

Redruth is an industrial suburb of Timaru, in the South Canterbury area and Canterbury region of New Zealand's South Island. It is located south of the town centre.

The suburb includes the Redruth Resource Recovery Park and landfill.

Saltwater Creek runs along the southern and eastern side of Redruth. Saltwater Creek Walkway is a track running in a loop around the creek and associated wetlands.

== Demographics ==
Redruth covers 1.56 km^{2} (0.60 sq mi). It is part of the Timaru East statistical area.

Historical population for Redruth
| Year | Pop. | ±% p.a. |
|---|---|---|
| 2013 | 66 | — |
| 2018 | 63 | −0.93% |
| 2023 | 54 | −3.04% |

Redruth had a population of 54 in the 2023 New Zealand census, a decrease of 9 people (−14.3%) since the 2018 census, and a decrease of 12 people (−18.2%) since the 2013 census. There were 27 males and 27 females in 27 dwellings. 5.6% of people identified as LGBTIQ+. The median age was 32.6 years (compared with 38.1 years nationally). There were 6 people (11.1%) aged under 15 years, 18 (33.3%) aged 15 to 29, 27 (50.0%) aged 30 to 64, and 3 (5.6%) aged 65 or older.

People could identify as more than one ethnicity. The results were 77.8% European (Pākehā), 11.1% Māori, 11.1% Pasifika, and 5.6% Asian. English was spoken by 100.0%, Māori by 5.6%, and other languages by 5.6%. The percentage of people born overseas was 22.2, compared with 28.8% nationally.

Religious affiliations were 16.7% Christian, and 5.6% Hindu. People who answered that they had no religion were 61.1%, and 5.6% of people did not answer the census question.

Of those at least 15 years old, 27 (56.2%) had a post-high school certificate or diploma, and 15 (31.2%) people exclusively held high school qualifications. The median income was $46,600, compared with $41,500 nationally. 3 people (6.2%) earned over $100,000 compared to 12.1% nationally. The employment status of those at least 15 was 33 (68.8%) full-time and 6 (12.5%) part-time.

=== Timaru East ===
Timaru East includes the mostly non-residential areas on the east side of the city including Port Timaru. It covers 3.70 km^{2} (1.43 sq mi) and had an estimated population of 290 as of June 2025, with a population density of 78 people per km^{2}.

Historical population for Timaru East
| Year | Pop. | ±% p.a. |
|---|---|---|
| 2006 | 300 | — |
| 2013 | 258 | −2.13% |
| 2018 | 273 | +1.14% |
| 2023 | 270 | −0.22% |

Timaru East had a population of 270 in the 2023 New Zealand census, a decrease of 3 people (−1.1%) since the 2018 census, and an increase of 12 people (4.7%) since the 2013 census. There were 129 males and 138 females in 135 dwellings. 3.3% of people identified as LGBTIQ+. The median age was 44.6 years (compared with 38.1 years nationally). There were 42 people (15.6%) aged under 15 years, 45 (16.7%) aged 15 to 29, 120 (44.4%) aged 30 to 64, and 63 (23.3%) aged 65 or older.

People could identify as more than one ethnicity. The results were 83.3% European (Pākehā), 12.2% Māori, 7.8% Pasifika, 7.8% Asian, and 2.2% other, which includes people giving their ethnicity as "New Zealander". English was spoken by 95.6%, Māori by 4.4%, Samoan by 1.1%, and other languages by 13.3%. No language could be spoken by 1.1% (e.g. too young to talk). New Zealand Sign Language was known by 1.1%. The percentage of people born overseas was 23.3, compared with 28.8% nationally.

Religious affiliations were 35.6% Christian, 2.2% Hindu, 3.3% Buddhist, 1.1% New Age, and 1.1% other religions. People who answered that they had no religion were 46.7%, and 8.9% of people did not answer the census question.

Of those at least 15 years old, 30 (13.2%) people had a bachelor's or higher degree, 123 (53.9%) had a post-high school certificate or diploma, and 72 (31.6%) people exclusively held high school qualifications. The median income was $36,200, compared with $41,500 nationally. 21 people (9.2%) earned over $100,000 compared to 12.1% nationally. The employment status of those at least 15 was 96 (42.1%) full-time, 33 (14.5%) part-time, and 12 (5.3%) unemployed.
