= Aorangi Oval =

Cricket ground in Timaru, New Zealand

- Interactive map of Aorangi Oval

Ground information
- Location: Gleniti, Timaru, New Zealand
- Country: New Zealand
- Coordinates: 44°23′00.88″S 171°12′21.53″E
- Establishment: 1974
- End names
- Pavilion End; City End

International information
- First women's ODI: 21 November 2000: New Zealand v England
- Last women's ODI: 22 November 2000: New Zealand v England

Team information
Canterbury Women	(2002 & 2007)
Canterbury	(1981–present)
- As of 1 September 2020; Source: Ground profile

Aorangi Oval is a cricket ground in Timaru, South Canterbury, New Zealand, situated on Morgans Road in the suburb of Gleniti. It is a part of Aorangi Park, South Canterbury's major sporting complex, which includes facilities for several outdoor sports and the Southern Trust Events Centre for indoor sports. It is the headquarters for the South Canterbury Cricket Association and the South Canterbury cricket team, which competes in the Hawke Cup.

The land for the park was acquired in 1953, but development did not begin until 1970. The park was named Aorangi Park in 1972. The stadium and netball courts were developed in 1974 and the first sports field in 1975. Development continued through the 1970s.

List A cricket was first held at Aorangi Oval in the 1980/81 Shell Cup when Canterbury played Wellington. To date the ground has held a total of fifteen List A matches. First-class cricket was first played there in February 1998 when Canterbury played the touring Zimbabweans. Later in November 1998, the Northern Conference played Pakistan A, while in 2003 Canterbury played two further first-class matches there in the 2002/03 State Championship. Canterbury have also played three Twenty20 matches there.

In 2000, Aorangi Oval hosted two Women's One Day Internationals between New Zealand Women and England Women. Canterbury Women played State League matches there in 2002 and 2007.
