= Ashburton Central =

- Suburb
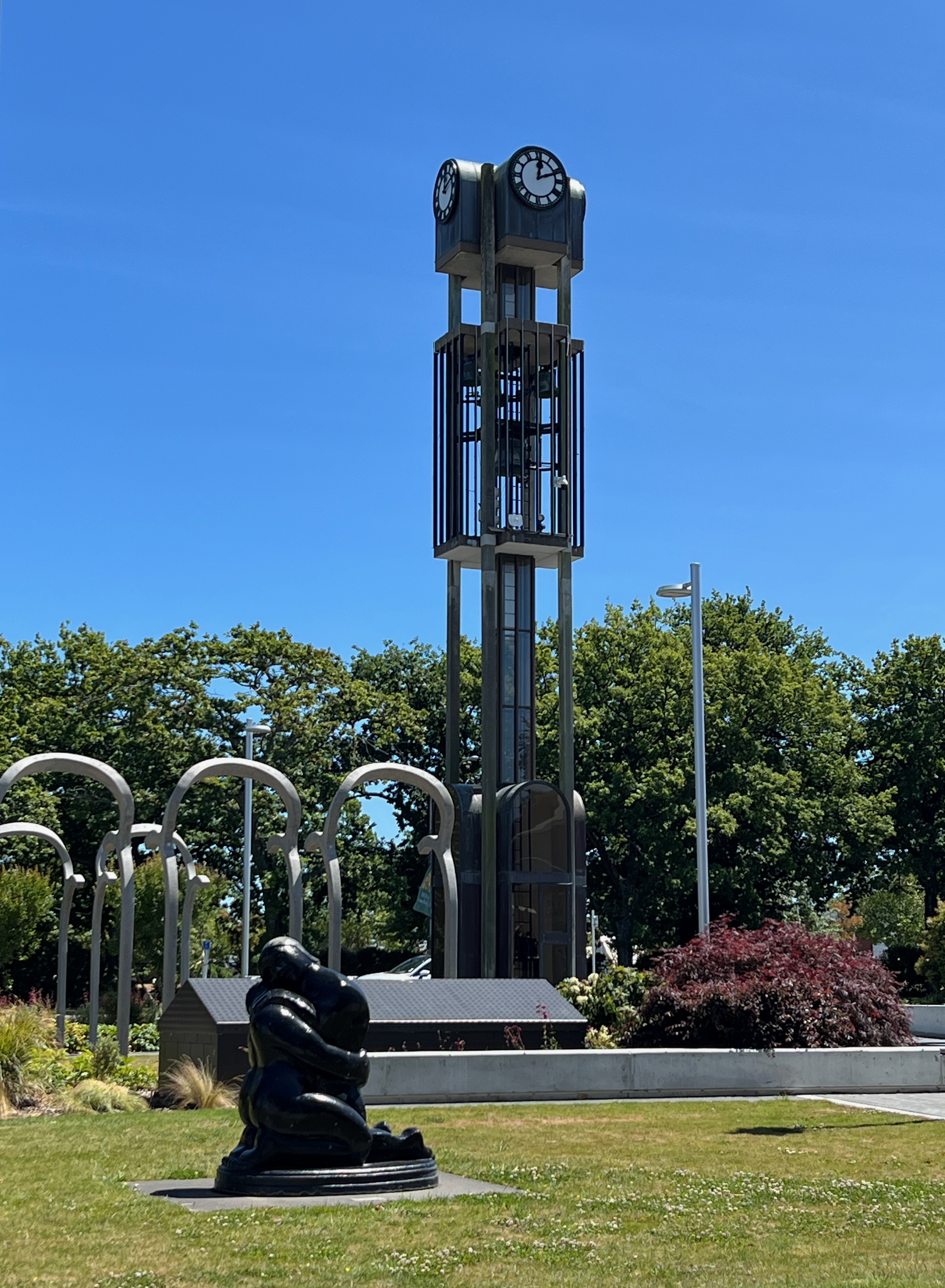
- Ashburton Clock Tower
- Interactive map of Ashburton Central
- Coordinates: 43.903°S 171.750°E
- Country: New Zealand
- City: Ashburton
- Local authority: Ashburton District Council
- Electoral ward: Ashburton

Area
  - Land: 256 ha (630 acres)

Population (June 2025)
  - Total: 160
  - Density: 62/km^{2} (160/sq mi)
- Hospitals: Tuarangi Home

	Allenton
	Ashburton Central	Netherby
Tinwald		Hampstead

Ashburton Central is the central suburb and central business district of Ashburton, in the Ashburton District and Canterbury Region of New Zealand's South Island.

The town was surveyed by Robert Park in 1864. It was laid out around two central squares either side of the Main South railway line and State Highway 1, Baring Square East and Baring Square West. The Ashburton Domain was included in the plans for the purposes of gardens and recreation.

The clock tower is a well-known landmark in the centre of Ashburton. The Ashburton Clock Tower was designed by Warren and Mahoney Architects and built in 1976 by Bradford Construction Ltd. The clock was originally ordered in 1902 and installed in a tower of the Post Office building in 1904. It was removed in 1946 when the tower was deemed a seismic risk. The clock and its bells remained in storage until they were reinstalled in the new tower in 1976. The clock tower has won awards including for “Enduring Architecture” in 2004 from the New Zealand Institute of Architects.

In 2017, the Ashburton District Council began work on revitalising the central business district of Ashburton, with the aim of attracting businesses and customers back into the commercial centre of the town.

A new library and civic centre for Ashburton was built between 2021 and 2023, at a final cost of $62.1 million, with a $20 million contribution from the New Zealand government. The three-story building includes council chambers, office space, a recording studio, areas to study in, a library and a performance area. The design also incorporates the historic Pioneer Hall into the facility. The civic centre was named Te Whare Whakatere. It is located in the block behind the Ashburton clock tower on Baring Square East.

Tuarangi Home, located in Ashburton Central, is a public hospital facility operated by Canterbury District Health Board. It has 37 beds, and provides geriatric, psychogeriatric, rest home care, dementia care and medical services.

Two people were killed and two others almost died during a shooting at the Work and Income office in Ashburton Central on 1 September 2014.

== Demographics ==
Ashburton Central covers 2.56 km^{2} (0.99 sq mi) and had an estimated population of 160 as of June 2025, with a population density of 63 people per km^{2}.

Historical population
Year	Pop.	±% p.a.
2006	162	—
2013	147	−1.38%
2018	141	−0.83%
2023	162	+2.82%

Ashburton Central had a population of 162 in the 2023 New Zealand census, an increase of 21 people (14.9%) since the 2018 census, and an increase of 15 people (10.2%) since the 2013 census. There were 78 males and 81 females in 75 dwellings. The median age was 58.7 years (compared with 38.1 years nationally). There were 21 people (13.0%) aged under 15 years, 21 (13.0%) aged 15 to 29, 57 (35.2%) aged 30 to 64, and 60 (37.0%) aged 65 or older.

People could identify as more than one ethnicity. The results were 77.8% European (Pākehā), 7.4% Māori, 14.8% Pasifika, 9.3% Asian, and 3.7% other, which includes people giving their ethnicity as "New Zealander". English was spoken by 98.1%, and other languages by 16.7%. The percentage of people born overseas was 27.8, compared with 28.8% nationally.

Religious affiliations were 57.4% Christian, 1.9% Hindu, 1.9% Islam, and 1.9% Buddhist. People who answered that they had no religion were 27.8%, and 9.3% of people did not answer the census question.

Of those at least 15 years old, 24 (17.0%) people had a bachelor's or higher degree, 72 (51.1%) had a post-high school certificate or diploma, and 42 (29.8%) people exclusively held high school qualifications. The median income was $30,400, compared with $41,500 nationally. 15 people (10.6%) earned over $100,000 compared to 12.1% nationally. The employment status of those at least 15 was 57 (40.4%) full-time and 18 (12.8%) part-time.
