= Masterton Central =

Central business district of Masterton, New Zealand

- Suburb
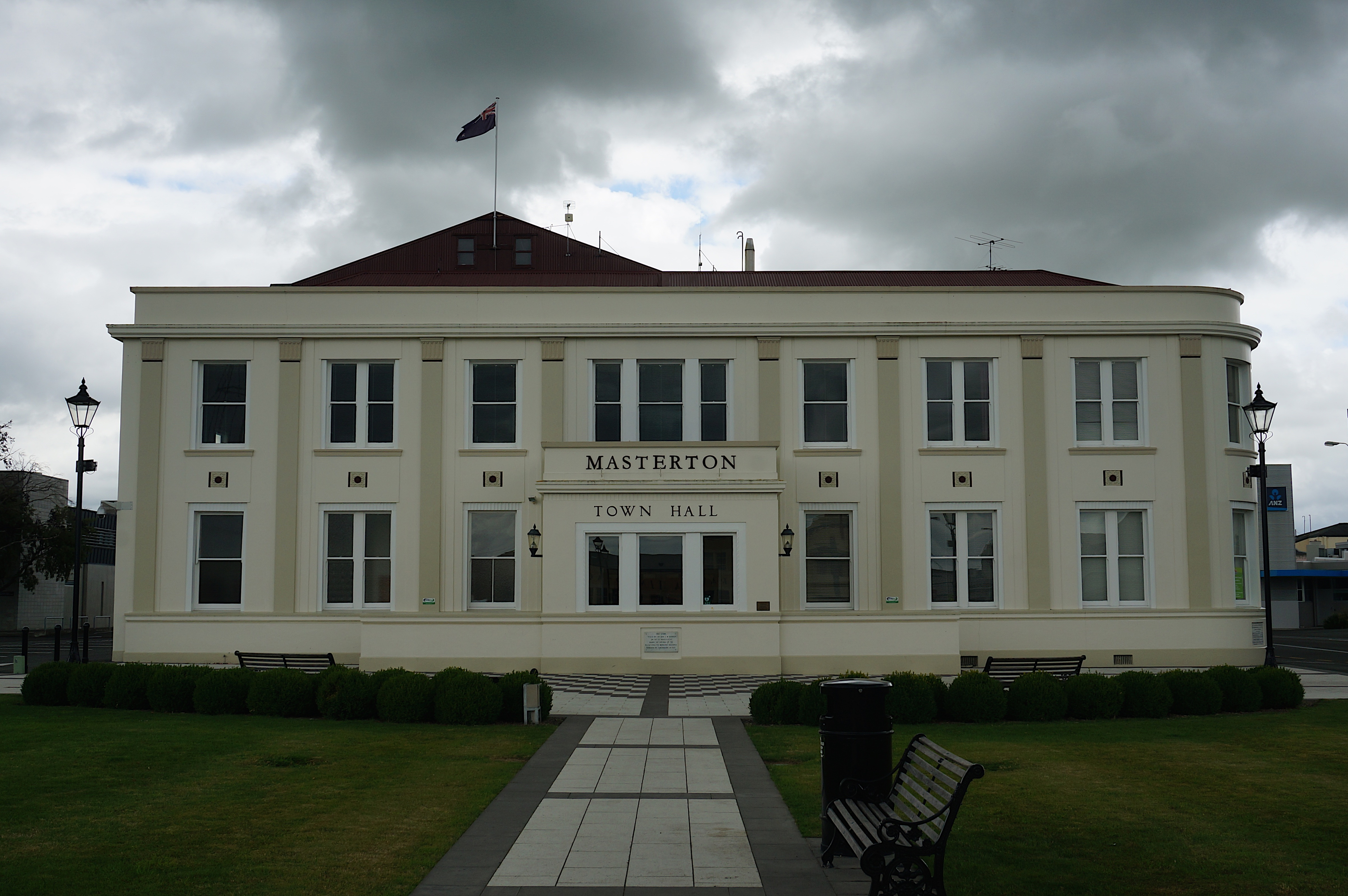
- Masterton Town Hall
- Interactive map of Masterton Central
- Country: New Zealand
- City: Masterton
- Local authority: Masterton District Council

Area
  - Land: 176 ha (430 acres)

Population (June 2025)
  - Total: 650
  - Density: 370/km^{2} (960/sq mi)

		Lansdowne
Masterton West	North West East South
Kuripuni; Solway		Masterton East

Masterton Central is a suburb of Masterton, a town on New Zealand's North Island.

It consists of a central business district centred on Queen Street. Commercial activity on the street drifted south in the 1990s, but the northern end of the street experienced a resurgence in the 2000s. Plans for a redevelopment of the street were drawn up in 2016 and went through public consultation in 2017.

== Demographics ==
Masterton Central statistical area covers 1.76 km^{2} (0.68 sq mi). It had an estimated population of 650 as of June 2025, with a population density of 369 people per km^{2}.

Historical population
Year	Pop.	±% p.a.
2006	678	—
2013	606	−1.59%
2018	711	+3.25%
2023	642	−2.02%

Masterton Central had a population of 642 in the 2023 New Zealand census, a decrease of 69 people (−9.7%) since the 2018 census, and an increase of 36 people (5.9%) since the 2013 census. There were 303 males, 333 females, and 6 people of other genders in 270 dwellings. 4.7% of people identified as LGBTIQ+. The median age was 42.6 years (compared with 38.1 years nationally). There were 108 people (16.8%) aged under 15 years, 114 (17.8%) aged 15 to 29, 276 (43.0%) aged 30 to 64, and 144 (22.4%) aged 65 or older.

People could identify as more than one ethnicity. The results were 84.6% European (Pākehā); 21.5% Māori; 4.7% Pasifika; 6.5% Asian; 0.9% Middle Eastern, Latin American and African New Zealanders (MELAA); and 2.8% other, which includes people giving their ethnicity as "New Zealander". English was spoken by 96.7%, Māori by 4.7%, Samoan by 0.5%, and other languages by 5.1%. No language could be spoken by 1.4% (e.g. too young to talk). New Zealand Sign Language was known by 0.9%. The percentage of people born overseas was 16.4, compared with 28.8% nationally.

Religious affiliations were 26.2% Christian, 0.9% Hindu, 0.9% Islam, 0.9% Māori religious beliefs, 0.9% New Age, and 2.8% other religions. People who answered that they had no religion were 60.3%, and 7.5% of people did not answer the census question.

Of those at least 15 years old, 81 (15.2%) people had a bachelor's or higher degree, 279 (52.2%) had a post-high school certificate or diploma, and 171 (32.0%) people exclusively held high school qualifications. The median income was $34,400, compared with $41,500 nationally. 21 people (3.9%) earned over $100,000 compared to 12.1% nationally. The employment status of those at least 15 was 240 (44.9%) full-time, 66 (12.4%) part-time, and 15 (2.8%) unemployed.

== Education ==
St Patrick's School is a co-educational state integrated Catholic primary school for Year 1 to 6 students, with a roll of 217 as of July 2026. It opened in 1883, and moved to its current site in 1978.
