= List of functional urban areas in New Zealand =

This is a list of functional urban areas in New Zealand, as defined by Statistics New Zealand.

Under the Statistical Standard for Geographic Areas 2023 and Statistical Standard for Geographic Areas 2018, a functional urban area is an urban area, rural settlement or rural statistical area where there is a major, large, medium or small urban core with more than 5,000 residents. They may also have urban cores, satellite urban areas, rural settlements and rural hinterland areas where at least 40% of workers commute to the urban core or associated secondary urban core for work. Functional urban areas are based on linkages between where people live and where they work, shop, access healthcare, and take part in recreation activities.

As of 2026, there are 55 functional urban areas in New Zealand. The sections below lists these areas, and give their estimated populations as of June 2025.

Dargaville and Waiheke West were added as functional urban areas in 2026.

== Metropolitan areas ==
- Auckland (1,794,400) – Auckland, Hibiscus Coast, Pukekohe, Beachlands-Pine Harbour, Clarks Beach, Helensville, Kumeu-Huapai, Maraetai, Muriwai, Parakai, Patumāhoe, Pōkeno, Riverhead, Tuakau, Waimauku, Waiuku
- Christchurch (556,500) – Christchurch, Kaiapoi, Rangiora, Rolleston, Diamond Harbour, Leeston, Lincoln, Lyttelton, Pegasus, Prebbleton, West Melton, Woodend
- Wellington (441,200) – Wellington, Lower Hutt, Porirua, Upper Hutt, Featherston, Greytown
- Hamilton (235,700) – Hamilton, Ngāruawāhia
- Tauranga (184,000) – Tauranga, Ōmokoroa
- Dunedin (131,600) – Dunedin, Mosgiel, Brighton, Waikouaiti

== Large regional centres ==
- Palmerston North (99,300) – Palmerston North, Ashhurst
- Whangārei (92,600) – Whangārei, Hikurangi, Ngunguru, One Tree Point, Ruakākā
- Nelson (89,100) – Nelson, Richmond, Brightwater, Hope, Māpua, Wakefield
- New Plymouth (88,300) – New Plymouth, Inglewood, Ōakura, Waitara
- Hastings (81,800) – Hastings, Havelock North, Clive
- Rotorua (72,800) – Rotorua, Ngongotahā
- Napier (68,900)
- Invercargill (58,000)
- Kāpiti Coast (49,900) – Paraparaumu, Waikanae, Paekākāriki
- Whanganui (48,100)
- Gisborne (43,600)

== Medium regional centres ==
- Timaru (41,000) – Timaru, Pleasant Point, Temuka
- Masterton (36,200) – Masterton, Carterton
- Queenstown (33,900) – Queenstown, Arrowtown, Arthurs Point, Lake Hayes
- Blenheim (32,400)
- Taupō (32,300) - Taupo, Kinloch
- Levin (29,900) – Levin, Shannon
- Cambridge (25,700)
- Ashburton (24,300)
- Whakatāne (23,100) – Whakatāne, Ōhope
- Te Awamutu (22,700) – Te Awamutu, Kihikihi, Pirongia
- Feilding (19,850)
- Wānaka (18,100) – Wānaka, Lake Hāwea
- Oamaru (16,700)
- Tokoroa (14,650)
- Greymouth (12,900) – Greymouth, Runanga

== Small regional centres (population 5000+) ==
- Warkworth (16,350) – Warkworth, Snells Beach
- Kerikeri (14,700)
- Kaitaia (13,500)
- Hāwera (12,800)
- Te Puke (12,000)
- Morrinsville (11,250)
- Gore (10,550) – Gore, Mataura
- Cromwell (9,960)
- Motueka (9,880)
- Matamata (9,540)
- Alexandra (9,460) – Alexandra, Clyde
- Thames (9,230)
- Huntly (8,700)
- Waiheke West (8,160)
- Ōtaki (8,140) – Ōtaki, Ōtaki Beach
- Kawerau (8,020)
- Stratford (7,990)
- Dannevirke (6,560)
- Katikati (6,340)
- Whitianga (6,300)
- Marton (6,180)
- Waihi (5,850)
- Dargaville (5,170)

== See also ==
- Cities in New Zealand
- List of populated places in New Zealand
- List of statistical areas in New Zealand
