= Kensington, New Zealand =

Kensington is the name of several places in New Zealand:

- Kensington, Dunedin, a suburb of Dunedin in the South Island
- Kensington, Timaru, a suburb of Timaru in the South Island
- Kensington, Whangārei, a suburb of Whangārei in the North Island
