= Princess Margaret Hospital, Christchurch =

Hospital in Christchurch, New Zealand

Princess Margaret Hospital
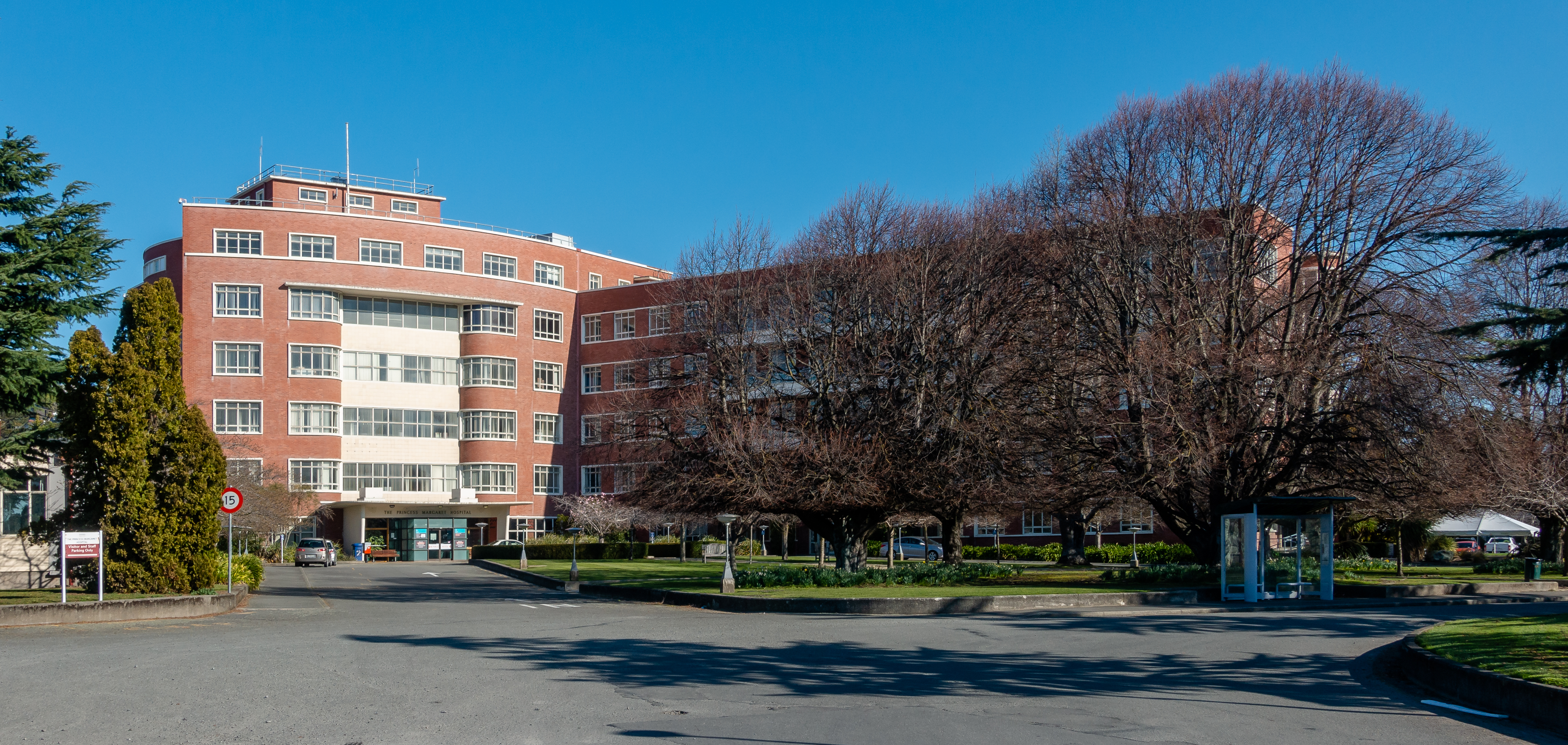
- A view of the hospital

Geography
- Location: Christchurch, Canterbury Region, New Zealand
- Coordinates: 43.571°S 172.62°E

Organisation
- Care system: Health NZ
- Type: General

Services
- Emergency department: No

History
- Founded: 31 August 1959
- Closed: 9 December 2024; 18 months ago

Links
- Lists: Hospitals in New Zealand

Princess Margaret Hospital was a public hospital in Christchurch, New Zealand, run by the Canterbury District Health Board. It opened in 1959 and closed in 2024.

== History ==
The hospital was built at the foot of the Port Hills, at the western edge of the suburb of Cashmere. It was named after Princess Margaret, sister of Queen Elizabeth II.

The land was purchased from the Cracroft Wilson estate and the buildings designed by the Christchurch architectural partnership of Seward and Stanton. Charles Luney was chosen as the construction professional. The complex was opened by the then Governor-General of New Zealand, Charles Lyttelton, 10th Viscount Cobham.

At one point, it was thought that it would become the main hospital for Christchurch. However, it was determined to be too far away from the city centre. The SEGAR block was opened on 31 August 1959 as a general hospital, but was later primarily used for older persons' health care and mental health services. It also housed much of the administration of Canterbury District Health Board.

== South Island Eating Disorders Service and Mothers and Babies ==
Princess Margaret Hospital had a regional service for people suffering from eating disorders, known as the South Island Eating Disorders Service. It was the only place in New Zealand with an in-patient unit specifically offering programmes to treat people with eating disorders. As well as an in-patient service for mothers and babies.
