= Canterbury District Health Board =

District health board in Canterbury, New Zealand

- Te Poari Hauora ō Waitaha

- Location of the Canterbury DHB (green) in New Zealand
- Abbreviation: CDHB
- Successor: Te Whatu Ora (Health New Zealand)
- Formation: 14 December 2000; 25 years ago
- Founder: The New Zealand Government
- Dissolved: 1 July 2022; 4 years ago
- Legal status: Defunct
- Purpose: DHB
- Headquarters: 32 Oxford Terrace, Christchurch
- Location: Central City
- Region served: Canterbury, New Zealand
- Services: Health and disability services
- Chairman: Sir John Hansen
- Chief executive: Dr Peter Bramley
- Deputy chair: Gabrielle Huria
- Parent organization: Ministry of Health
- Subsidiaries: South Island Shared Service Agency Limited (47%); Canterbury Linen Services Limited (100%); Brackenridge Estate Limited (100%); NZ Health Innovation Hub (25%)
- Revenue: $1,980 million (2019/20)
- Expenses: $2,223 million (2019/20)
- Staff: 11,352 (2019/20)
- Website: www.cdhb.health.nz

The Canterbury District Health Board (Canterbury DHB or CDHB; Māori: Te Poari Hauora ō Waitaha) was a district health board with the focus on providing healthcare to the Canterbury region of New Zealand, north of the Rangitata River. It was responsible for roughly 579,000 residents, or 12% of New Zealand's population. The Canterbury District Health Board covered a territory of 26,881 square kilometers and was divided between six territorial local authorities. In July 2022, the Canterbury DHB was merged into the national health service Te Whatu Ora (Health New Zealand).

== History ==
The Canterbury District Health Board, like most other district health boards, came into effect on 1 January 2001.

In 2001, after multiple union contracts fell through, more than 1100 staff members of The Princess Margaret Hospital went on strike to protest the uncertainty regarding their jobs at the hospital, and the full strike involved roughly 3000 people from hospitals throughout the region.

In July 2005, The New Zealand Herald reported that the Canterbury District Health Board and Telecom NZ had signed a three-year telecommunications deal. The deal gave Telecom NZ the responsibility for providing all health board telecommunications. There was also a two-year right of renewal clause.

In September 2005, the health board was accused of "virtually sweat shop conditions" by the National Union of Public Employees. The board denied all accusations against them. Following the accusations, roughly 500 personnel from the district started a five-day strike for a 30% pay rise.

In December 2016, approximately 3974 appointments were postponed due to a payment dispute with the Regional District Health Boards, including Canterbury, and members of the Association of Salaried Medical Specialists. It was estimated that the resident medical officers had forfeited roughly $1.1 million in lost wages.

The district health board had been regarded as a successful accountable care system which has moderated the rate of growth in hospital use by investing in services in the community. GPs and consultants agreed health pathways for the diagnosis and treatment of patients with common medical conditions thereby breaking down barriers between clinicians.

On 1 July 2022, the Canterbury DHB was merged into the national health service Health New Zealand as part of an overhaul of the country's district health board system. The Canterbury DHB's functions and operations were assumed by Te Whatu Ora's Te Waipounamu division, which covers the entire South Island.

== Geographic area ==
The area covered by the Canterbury District Health Board was defined in Schedule 1 of the New Zealand Public Health and Disability Act 2000 and based on territorial authority and ward boundaries as constituted as at 1 January 2001. The area could have been adjusted through an Order in Council.

== Governance ==
The CDHB, like other district health boards, was governed by a group that is partially elected and partially appointed. Since the 2001 New Zealand local elections, the elected part of the board had been determined as part of the triennial local elections using the single transferable vote system. There were generally eleven board members, seven of whom are elected and the remaining appointed by the minister of health. The minister also appointed the chairperson and deputy chair from the pool of eleven members.

=== 2010–2013 ===
The following were elected in the 2010 local elections or appointed by the minister of health:

- Bruce Matheson (chair; appointed)
- Peter Ballantyne (deputy chair; appointed)
- Anna Crighton (elected)
- Elizabeth Cunningham (appointed)
- Andrew Dickerson (elected)
- Wendy Gilchrist (elected)
- Aaron Keown (elected)
- Chris Mene (elected)
- David Morrell (elected)
- Susan Wallace (appointed)
- Olive Webb (elected)

=== 2013–2016 ===
The following were elected in the 2013 local elections or appointed by the minister of health:

- Murray Cleverley (chair; appointed)
- Steve Wakefield (deputy chair; appointed)
- Sally Buck (elected)
- Anna Crighton (elected)
- Andrew Dickerson (elected)
- Jo Kane (elected)
- Aaron Keown (elected)
- Chris Mene (elected)
- Edie Moke (appointed)
- David Morrell (elected)
- Susan Wallace (appointed)

=== 2019–2022 ===
The following were elected in the 2019 local elections:

- Sally Buck (resigned July 2020; died 9 September 2020)
- James Gough
- Jo Kane
- Naomi Marshall
- Aaron Keown
- Catherine Chu
- Andrew Dickerson

The four members appointed by the Minister of Health are:

- Sir John Hansen (chair)
- Gabrielle Huria (deputy chair)
- Barry Bragg
- Ingrid Taylor

=== Chairperson ===
At most district health boards, the previous Hospital and Health Service (HHS) board chair was appointed as the inaugural chair, but not so at the Canterbury District Health Board. When the acting chairperson of the HHS board Humphry Rolleston retired, Syd Bradley was appointed the inaugural CDHB chairperson by Health Minister Annette King starting 1 January 2001.

Bradley was succeeded in November 2007 by Alister James, who was appointed chairperson by Health Minister David Cunliffe. After serving as a Christchurch City Councillor until 2004, James successfully stood for the CDHB in October 2004 instead. In the 2007 local elections, James was defeated, but Cunliffe made him the government-appointed chair.

Health Minister Tony Ryall appointed Bruce Matheson in November 2010 to replace James. In 2013, Ryall appointed Murray Cleverley, concurrently with the chairpersonship for the South Canterbury District Health Board (where he had been chair since January 2010). In February 2017, Cleverley resigned from the district health board positions over alleged fraudulent activity carried out by staff reporting to him at the Canterbury Earthquake Recovery Authority (CERA). Sir Mark Solomon, who had been appointed by Health Minister Jonathan Coleman in November 2016 as deputy chair, took over as acting chair from Cleverly.

In August 2017, former diplomat and current university chancellor John Wood was appointed by Coleman as the new chair, with Solomon returning to the role of deputy chair. In December 2019, retired judge Sir John Hansen was appointed by Health Minister David Clark to succeed Wood.

== Demographics ==
Historical population
Year	Pop.	±% p.a.
2006	467,016	—
2013	482,778	+0.48%
2018	539,631	+2.25%

Canterbury DHB served a population of 539,631 at the 2018 New Zealand census, an increase of 56,853 people (11.8%) since the 2013 census, and an increase of 72,615 people (15.5%) since the 2006 census. There were 200,694 households. There were 269,550 males and 270,081 females, giving a sex ratio of 1.0 males per female. The median age was 38.2 years (compared with 37.4 years nationally), with 98,541 people (18.3%) aged under 15 years, 111,957 (20.7%) aged 15 to 29, 246,159 (45.6%) aged 30 to 64, and 82,968 (15.4%) aged 65 or older.

Ethnicities were 81.6% European/Pākehā, 9.5% Māori, 3.3% Pacific peoples, 11.8% Asian, and 2.7% other ethnicities. People may identify with more than one ethnicity.

The percentage of people born overseas was 24.1, compared with 27.1% nationally.

Although some people objected to giving their religion, 51.3% had no religion, 36.7% were Christian, 1.4% were Hindu, 0.8% were Muslim, 0.8% were Buddhist and 2.6% had other religions.

Of those at least 15 years old, 98,127 (22.2%) people had a bachelor or higher degree, and 75,732 (17.2%) people had no formal qualifications. The median income was $34,200, compared with $31,800 nationally. 76,491 people (17.3%) earned over $70,000 compared to 17.2% nationally. The employment status of those at least 15 was that 226,362 (51.3%) people were employed full-time, 68,367 (15.5%) were part-time, and 14,703 (3.3%) were unemployed.

== Hospitals ==
=== Christchurch public hospitals ===
- Christchurch Hospital (43.5343563°S 172.623398°E) in Christchurch Central, Christchurch has 833 beds and provides medical, surgical, maternity and children's health services. The hospital is the major trauma centre for the Canterbury DHB area, and the tertiary major trauma centre for the Canterbury and West Coast regions.
- Burwood Hospital (43.4803896°S 172.6819432°E) in Burwood, Christchurch has 229 beds and provides surgical, mental health, geriatric and medical services.
- Hillmorton Hospital (43.5481211°S 172.5887335°E) in Spreydon, Christchurch has 195 beds and provides mental health services.
- Princess Margaret Hospital (43.570538°S 172.61885°E) in Cashmere, Christchurch has 53 beds and provides psychogeriatric, medical and mental health services.

=== Christchurch private hospitals ===
- St George's Hospital (43.5105583°S 172.6167017°E) in Strowan, Christchurch has 93 beds and provides maternity and surgical services. In April 2023, the hospital announced its maternity unit would close in June 2023, citing staffing shortages.
- Southern Cross Hospital Christchurch (43.5202485°S 172.6329178°E) in Christchurch Central, Christchurch has 86 beds and provides surgical and medical services.
- Forte Health Hospital (43.5260886°S 172.6359329°E) in Christchurch Central, Christchurch has 30 beds and provides surgical services.
- Nurse Maude Hospice (43.5338727°S 172.5623288°E) in St Albans, Christchurch has 11 beds and provides medical services.

=== Ashburton public hospitals ===
- Ashburton Hospital (43.8940722°S 171.7441741°E) in Allenton, Ashburton, Ashburton District has 54 beds and provides maternity, medical and surgical services.
- Tuarangi Home (43.9061441°S 171.7511082°E) in Ashburton East, Ashburton, Ashburton District has 37 beds and provides geriatric, psychogeriatric, rest home care, dementia care and medical services.

=== Selwyn public hospitals ===
- Ellesmere Hospital (43.7575903°S 172.3001511°E) in Leeston, Selwyn District has 10 beds and provides medical and geriatric services.
- Lincoln Maternity Hospital (43.6352162°S 172.4869435°E) in Lincoln, Selwyn District has seven beds and provides maternity services.
- Darfield Hospital (43.4872853°S 172.1152776°E) in Darfield, Selwyn has nine beds and provides maternity, geriatric and medical services.

=== Other public hospitals ===
- Kaikoura Hospital/Te Hā o Te Ora (42.4046628°S 173.6793146°E) in Kaikōura, Kaikōura District has 21 beds and provides geriatric, medical and maternity services.
- Rangiora Hospital (43.2891387°S 172.5891225°E) in Rangiora, Waimakariri has 16 beds and provides medical and maternity services.
- Oxford Hospital (43.3028112°S 172.1897368°E) in Oxford, Waimakariri District has 15 beds and provides medical and geriatric services.
- Waikari Hospital (42.9669839°S 172.6846052°E) in Waikari, Hurunui District has 10 beds and provides geriatric, medical and maternity services.
- Chatham Island Health Centre (43.95451°S 176.560393°W) in Waitangi, Chatham Islands has three beds and provides medical services.
