= Allenton, New Zealand =

Allenton
- Suburb
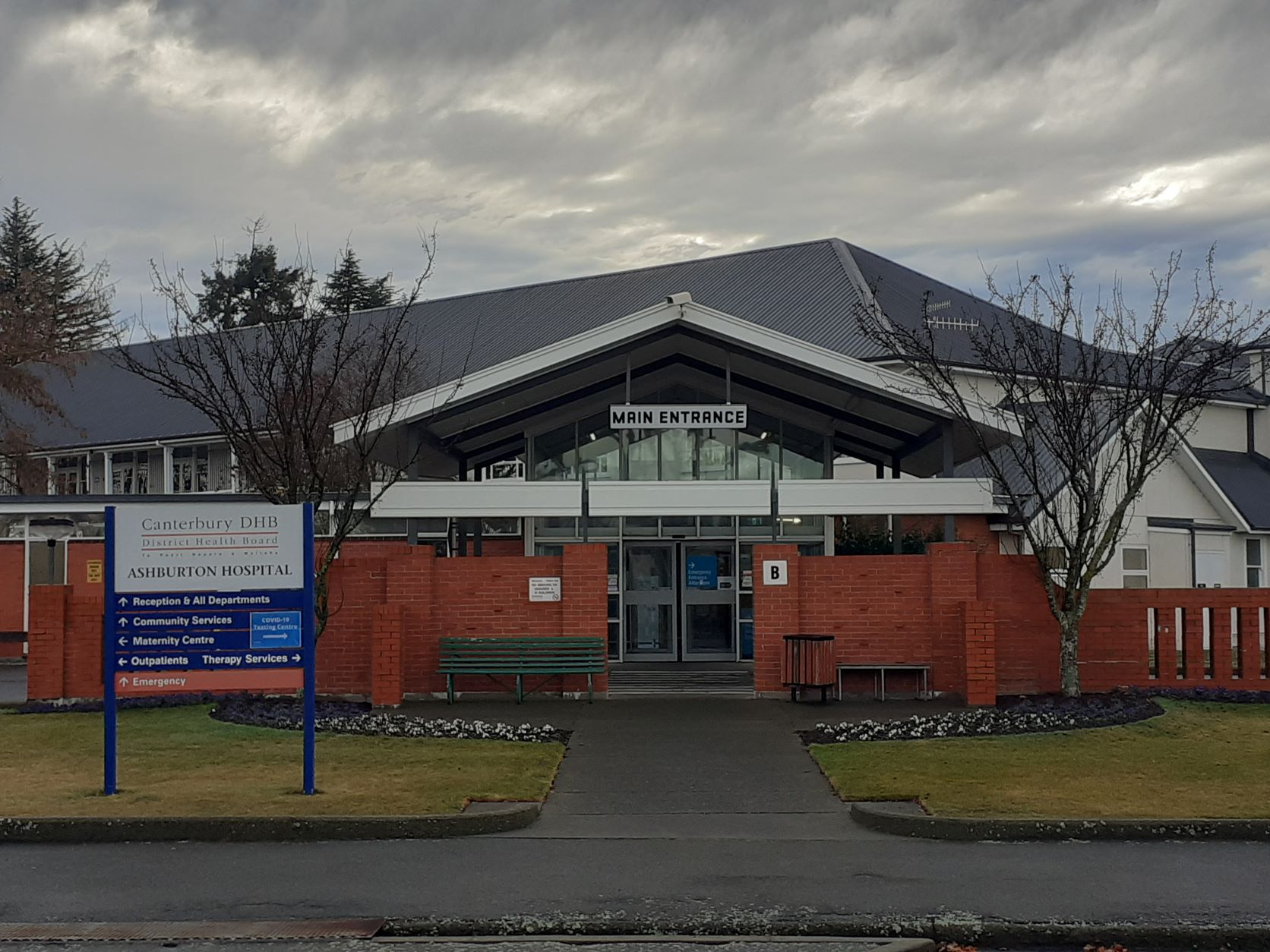
- Ashburton Hospital
- Interactive map of Allenton
- Coordinates: 43.8753561°S 171.7170968°E
- Country: New Zealand
- City: Ashburton
- Local authority: Ashburton District Council
- Electoral ward: Ashburton

Area
  - Land: 626 ha (1,550 acres)

Population (June 2025)
  - Total: 7,430
  - Density: 1,190/km^{2} (3,070/sq mi)
- Hospitals: Ashburton Hospital

Westerfield	Winchmore	Mitcham
Lagmhor	Allenton	Ashburton North
Tinwald	Ashburton Central	Netherby

Allenton is a suburb of Ashburton, in the Ashburton District and Canterbury Region of New Zealand's South Island.

The suburb has its own rugby club.

Ashburton Hospital is located in Allenton. It is a public hospital of Canterbury District Health Board with 54 beds, which provides maternity, medical and surgical services.

== Demographics ==
Allenton covers 6.26 km^{2} (2.42 sq mi). It had an estimated population of 7,430 as of June 2025, with a population density of 1,187 people per km^{2}.

Historical population
Year	Pop.	±% p.a.
2006	5,688	—
2013	6,330	+1.54%
2018	6,792	+1.42%
2023	7,113	+0.93%

Allenton had a population of 7,113 in the 2023 New Zealand census, an increase of 321 people (4.7%) since the 2018 census, and an increase of 783 people (12.4%) since the 2013 census. There were 3,441 males, 3,657 females, and 18 people of other genders in 2,838 dwellings. 2.4% of people identified as LGBTIQ+. The median age was 45.0 years (compared with 38.1 years nationally). There were 1,254 people (17.6%) aged under 15 years, 1,092 (15.4%) aged 15 to 29, 2,844 (40.0%) aged 30 to 64, and 1,926 (27.1%) aged 65 or older.

People could identify as more than one ethnicity. The results were 82.9% European (Pākehā); 8.1% Māori; 7.0% Pasifika; 8.0% Asian; 1.2% Middle Eastern, Latin American and African New Zealanders (MELAA); and 2.2% other, which includes people giving their ethnicity as "New Zealander". English was spoken by 97.4%, Māori by 1.1%, Samoan by 1.6%, and other languages by 10.7%. No language could be spoken by 1.7% (e.g. too young to talk). New Zealand Sign Language was known by 0.4%. The percentage of people born overseas was 18.9, compared with 28.8% nationally.

Religious affiliations were 44.7% Christian, 1.2% Hindu, 0.7% Islam, 0.3% Māori religious beliefs, 0.7% Buddhist, 0.3% New Age, and 0.9% other religions. People who answered that they had no religion were 44.1%, and 7.1% of people did not answer the census question.

Of those at least 15 years old, 849 (14.5%) people had a bachelor's or higher degree, 3,327 (56.8%) had a post-high school certificate or diploma, and 1,689 (28.8%) people exclusively held high school qualifications. The median income was $38,500, compared with $41,500 nationally. 462 people (7.9%) earned over $100,000 compared to 12.1% nationally. The employment status of those at least 15 was 2,715 (46.3%) full-time, 828 (14.1%) part-time, and 90 (1.5%) unemployed.

Individual statistical areas
Name	Area (km^{2})	Population	Density (per km^{2})	Dwellings	Median age	Median income
Allenton North	2.10	2,703	1,287	1,128	51.6 years	$37,100
Allenton South	2.93	2,211	755	849	37.4 years	$42,000
Allenton East	1.24	2,199	1,773	861	45.4 years	$37,400
New Zealand					38.1 years	$41,500
