= Swarbrick =

Swarbrick is a surname. Notable people with the surname include:

== Politicians ==
- Anne Swarbrick (born c. 1952), Canadian politician
- Chlöe Swarbrick (born 1994), New Zealand politician

== Sport ==
- David Swarbrick (born 1927), English rugby player
- George Swarbrick (born 1942), Canadian ice hockey player
- George Swarbrick (footballer) (1930–2016), Australian rules footballer
- James Swarbrick (1880–1970), English footballer
- Matthew Swarbrick (born 1977), English cricketer
- Neil Swarbrick (born 1965), association football referee

== Other ==
- Dave Swarbrick (1941–2016), English folk musician
- Jack Swarbrick (born 1954), American lawyer and university administrator
- Nicholas Swarbrick (1898–2006), oldest surviving English merchant sailor of the First World War
- Paul Swarbrick (born 1958), Bishop of Lancaster
- Thomas Swarbrick (c. 1675 – c. 1753), English organ builder

== See also ==
- Swarbrick Formation, a geologic formation in Nevada, United States
- The Swarbriggs, Irish pop musicians
- Swarbrick statistical area, a statistical area within Hamilton, New Zealand
