= Hadlow, New Zealand =

Hadlow
- Rural Area
- Interactive map of Hadlow
- Coordinates: 44.364°S 171.104°E
- Country: New Zealand
- Region: Canterbury
- Territorial authority: Timaru District
- Ward: Timaru Ward
- Electorates: Waitaki; Rangitata; Te Tai Tonga (Māori)

Government
  - Territorial authority: Timaru District Council
  - Regional council: Environment Canterbury
  - Mayor of Timaru: Nigel Bowen
  - Waitaki MP/Rangitata MP: Miles Anderson/James Meager
  - Te Tai Tonga MP: Tākuta Ferris

Area
  - Total: 93.74 km^{2} (36.19 sq mi)

Population (June 2025)
  - Total: 1,600
  - Density: 17/km^{2} (44/sq mi)

Hadlow is a rural community in the Timaru District, New Zealand. It is located west of Timaru and south of Pleasant Point.

Hadlow to Harbour is an annual fun run of 3 or 10 km, depending on the route chosen. It has been operating since the 1990s. The event drew close to 1,000 people in 2020 and raised $8,000 for charity.

== Demographics ==
The Hadlow statistical area covers 93.74 km^{2} (36.19 sq mi) and had an estimated population of 1,600 as of June 2025, with a population density of 17 people per km^{2}.

Historical population
Year	Pop.	±% p.a.
2006	1,194	—
2013	1,272	+0.91%
2018	1,434	+2.43%
2023	1,560	+1.70%

Hadlow had a population of 1,560 in the 2023 New Zealand census, an increase of 126 people (8.8%) since the 2018 census, and an increase of 288 people (22.6%) since the 2013 census. There were 792 males and 768 females in 558 dwellings. 1.3% of people identified as LGBTIQ+. The median age was 48.1 years (compared with 38.1 years nationally). There were 306 people (19.6%) aged under 15 years, 198 (12.7%) aged 15 to 29, 765 (49.0%) aged 30 to 64, and 291 (18.7%) aged 65 or older.

People could identify as more than one ethnicity. The results were 96.3% European (Pākehā); 5.4% Māori; 0.8% Pasifika; 2.1% Asian; 0.6% Middle Eastern, Latin American and African New Zealanders (MELAA); and 2.7% other, which includes people giving their ethnicity as "New Zealander". English was spoken by 98.8%, Māori by 0.8%, Samoan by 0.4%, and other languages by 3.8%. No language could be spoken by 1.2% (e.g. too young to talk). New Zealand Sign Language was known by 0.6%. The percentage of people born overseas was 11.9, compared with 28.8% nationally.

Religious affiliations were 39.2% Christian, 0.4% Hindu, 0.2% Islam, 0.2% Buddhist, 0.2% New Age, and 0.4% other religions. People who answered that they had no religion were 52.3%, and 7.7% of people did not answer the census question.

Of those at least 15 years old, 279 (22.2%) people had a bachelor's or higher degree, 759 (60.5%) had a post-high school certificate or diploma, and 213 (17.0%) people exclusively held high school qualifications. The median income was $50,000, compared with $41,500 nationally. 225 people (17.9%) earned over $100,000 compared to 12.1% nationally. The employment status of those at least 15 was 678 (54.1%) full-time, 249 (19.9%) part-time, and 15 (1.2%) unemployed.
