= Parkhaven =

Parkhaven may refer to:

- Parkhaven, a neighborhood in South San Francisco, California
- Parkhaven, a statistical area in Ākina, New Zealand
- Empire Ouse, a cargo ship later renamed Parkhaven; see List of Empire ships (O)
- Parkhaven Campus, part of École Maïmonide, a French-language day school in Montreal
