= Waitahora =

Locality in Manawatū-Whanganui, New Zealand

- Interactive map of Waitahora
- Coordinates: 40.306°S 176.187°E
- Country: New Zealand
- Region: Manawatū-Whanganui
- Territorial authority: Tararua District
- Ward: North Tararua General Ward; Tamaki nui-a Rua Maori Ward
- Community: Dannevirke Community
- Electorates: Wairarapa; Ikaroa-Rāwhiti (Māori)

Government
  - Territorial Authority: Tararua District Council
  - Regional council: Horizons Regional Council
  - Tararua Mayor: Scott Gilmore
  - Wairarapa MP: Mike Butterick
  - Ikaroa-Rāwhiti MP: Cushla Tangaere-Manuel

Area
  - Total: 231.73 km^{2} (89.47 sq mi)

Population (2023 Census)
  - Total: 267
  - Density: 1.15/km^{2} (2.98/sq mi)
- Time zone: UTC+12 (NZST)
  - Summer (DST): UTC+13 (NZDT)
- Postcode: 4971

Waitahora is a locality in the Tararua District of New Zealand's North Island. It is located between the Mangatoro and Mangatokoto streams, close to the junction of the Waitahora Stream with the Mangatokoto.

The Waitahora Wind Farm was a proposed wind farm for the area, which was abandoned without construction having started.

== Demographics ==
Waitahora locality covers 231.73 km^{2} (89.47 sq mi). It is part of the larger Waitahora statistical area.

Historical population for the locality
Year	Pop.	±% p.a.
2013	225	—
2018	252	+2.29%
2023	267	+1.16%

Waitahora locality had a population of 267 in the 2023 New Zealand census, an increase of 15 people (6.0%) since the 2018 census, and an increase of 42 people (18.7%) since the 2013 census. There were 141 males and 123 females in 93 dwellings. 1.1% of people identified as LGBTIQ+. There were 75 people (28.1%) aged under 15 years, 42 (15.7%) aged 15 to 29, 123 (46.1%) aged 30 to 64, and 30 (11.2%) aged 65 or older.

People could identify as more than one ethnicity. The results were 91.0% European (Pākehā); 16.9% Māori; 1.1% Pasifika; 3.4% Asian; 1.1% Middle Eastern, Latin American and African New Zealanders (MELAA); and 4.5% other, which includes people giving their ethnicity as "New Zealander". English was spoken by 98.9%, Māori by 3.4%, and other languages by 4.5%. No language could be spoken by 1.1% (e.g. too young to talk). New Zealand Sign Language was known by 1.1%. The percentage of people born overseas was 7.9, compared with 28.8% nationally.

Religious affiliations were 25.8% Christian, 2.2% Māori religious beliefs, and 1.1% Jewish. People who answered that they had no religion were 62.9%, and 9.0% of people did not answer the census question.

Of those at least 15 years old, 39 (20.3%) people had a bachelor's or higher degree, 114 (59.4%) had a post-high school certificate or diploma, and 36 (18.8%) people exclusively held high school qualifications. 15 people (7.8%) earned over $100,000 compared to 12.1% nationally. The employment status of those at least 15 was 120 (62.5%) full-time, 36 (18.8%) part-time, and 3 (1.6%) unemployed.

=== Waitahora statistical area ===
Waitahora statistical area covers 538.22 km^{2} (207.81 sq mi) and had an estimated population of 670 as of June 2025, with a population density of 1.2 people per km^{2}.

Historical population for the statistical area
Year	Pop.	±% p.a.
2006	597	—
2013	570	−0.66%
2018	609	+1.33%
2023	639	+0.97%

Waitahora had a population of 639 in the 2023 New Zealand census, an increase of 30 people (4.9%) since the 2018 census, and an increase of 69 people (12.1%) since the 2013 census. There were 342 males and 300 females in 231 dwellings. 0.9% of people identified as LGBTIQ+. The median age was 36.5 years (compared with 38.1 years nationally). There were 162 people (25.4%) aged under 15 years, 105 (16.4%) aged 15 to 29, 297 (46.5%) aged 30 to 64, and 78 (12.2%) aged 65 or older.

People could identify as more than one ethnicity. The results were 84.5% European (Pākehā); 25.8% Māori; 1.4% Pasifika; 1.4% Asian; 0.5% Middle Eastern, Latin American and African New Zealanders (MELAA); and 4.7% other, which includes people giving their ethnicity as "New Zealander". English was spoken by 98.6%, Māori by 7.5%, and other languages by 2.8%. No language could be spoken by 1.4% (e.g. too young to talk). New Zealand Sign Language was known by 0.5%. The percentage of people born overseas was 7.5, compared with 28.8% nationally.

Religious affiliations were 27.7% Christian, 2.8% Māori religious beliefs, 0.5% New Age, 0.5% Jewish, and 0.5% other religions. People who answered that they had no religion were 58.7%, and 9.9% of people did not answer the census question.

Of those at least 15 years old, 87 (18.2%) people had a bachelor's or higher degree, 291 (61.0%) had a post-high school certificate or diploma, and 93 (19.5%) people exclusively held high school qualifications. The median income was $39,600, compared with $41,500 nationally. 33 people (6.9%) earned over $100,000 compared to 12.1% nationally. The employment status of those at least 15 was 294 (61.6%) full-time, 63 (13.2%) part-time, and 9 (1.9%) unemployed.

== Education ==
Waitahora School opened in 1903. It merged to Awariki School in 2002.

Motea School opened in 1916 and also closed in 2002.
