= Nelson Creek =

Stream in the US state of Missouri

Nelson Creek is a stream in Henry County in the U.S. state of Missouri. It is a tributary to Tebo Creek.

The stream headwaters arise just southeast of Missouri Route 52 about five miles northeast of Clinton at 38°25′05″N 93°42′04″W and the stream flows to its confluence with Tebo Creek 4.5 miles to the southeast at 38°23′31″N 93°37′28″W.

Nelson Creek has the name of a pioneer citizen.

== See also ==
- List of rivers of Missouri
