= Vipond =

Vipond is a surname. Notable people with the surname include:

- Dougie Vipond (born 1966), Scottish musician and television presenter
- Jonathan Vipond (born 1945), American politician
- Pete Vipond (born 1949), Canadian ice hockey player
- Shaun Vipond (born 1988), English footballer
- Tim Vipond (born 1982), Canadian businessperson

== See also ==
- Vieuxpont
