= Waipatukahu =

Locality in New Zealand

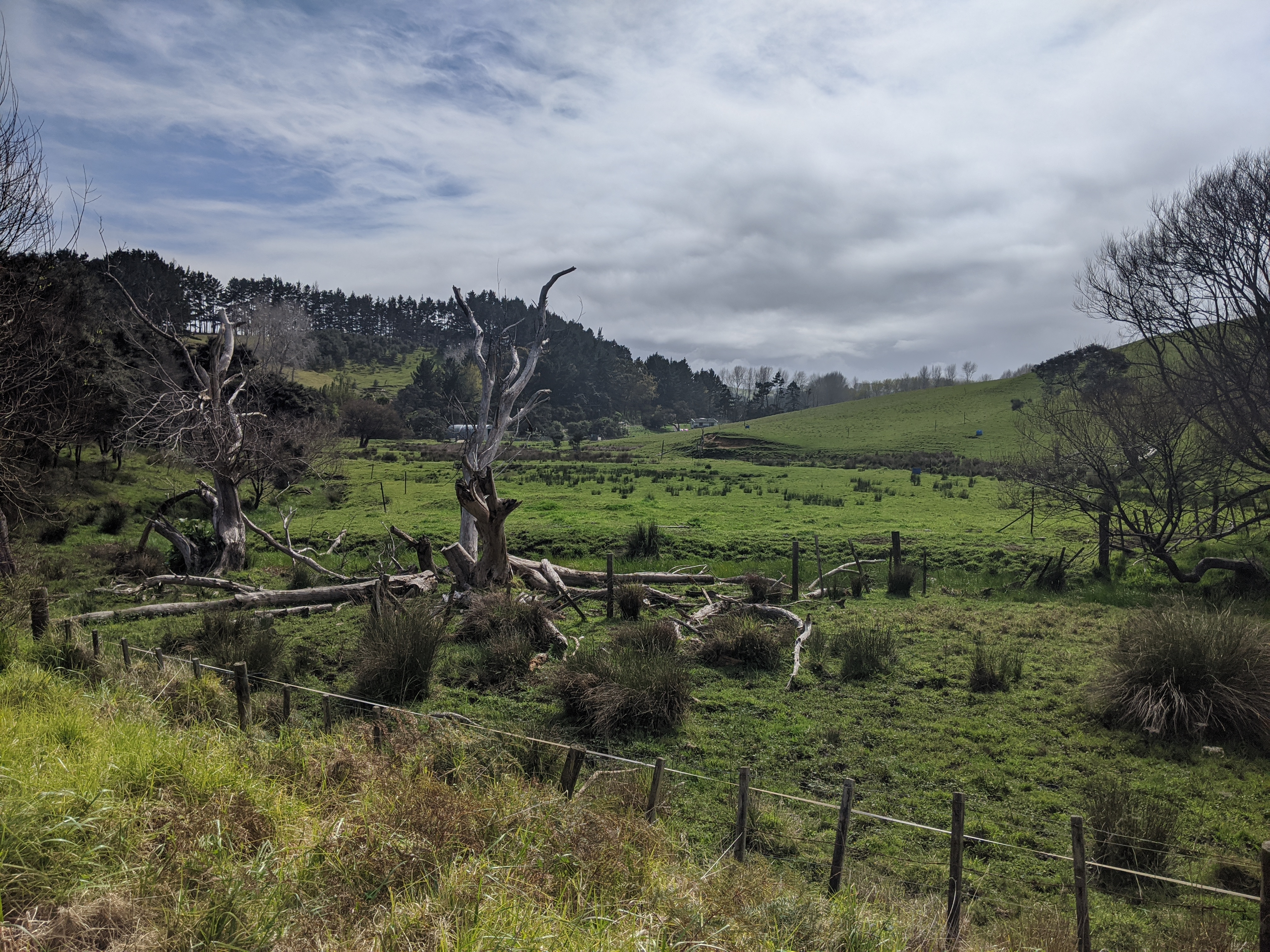
- Waipatukahu Valley
- Interactive map of Waipatukahu
- Coordinates: 36.776°S 174.449°E
- Country: New Zealand
- Region: Auckland Region
- Ward: Rodney ward
- Community board: Rodney Local Board
- Subdivision: Kumeū subdivision
- Electorates: Kaipara ki Mahurangi; Te Tai Tokerau

Government
  - Territorial Authority: Auckland Council
  - Mayor of Auckland: Wayne Brown
  - Kaipara ki Mahurangi MP: Chris Penk
  - Te Tai Tokerau MP: Mariameno Kapa-Kingi

Area
  - Total: 56.12 km^{2} (21.67 sq mi)

Population (June 2025)
  - Total: 1,740
  - Density: 31.0/km^{2} (80.3/sq mi)

Waipatukahu is a locality west of Auckland, in New Zealand. It surrounds Waipatukahu Stream, which flows north-north-east from Lake Paekawau, draining the Waimauku Plateau and the Western Sand Country, and joins the Kaipara River.

== Demographics ==
The statistical area of Waipatukahu extends west to the Tasman Sea, and slightly further east than Waimauku. It includes Woodhill but doesn't include Waimauku or Muriwai. Waipatukahu covers 56.12 km^{2} (21.67 sq mi) and had an estimated population of 1,740 as of June 2025, with a population density of 31 people per km^{2}.

Historical population
Year	Pop.	±% p.a.
2006	1,188	—
2013	1,398	+2.35%
2018	1,635	+3.18%
2023	1,626	−0.11%
The 2006 population is for a smaller area of 52.06 km^{2}. Source:

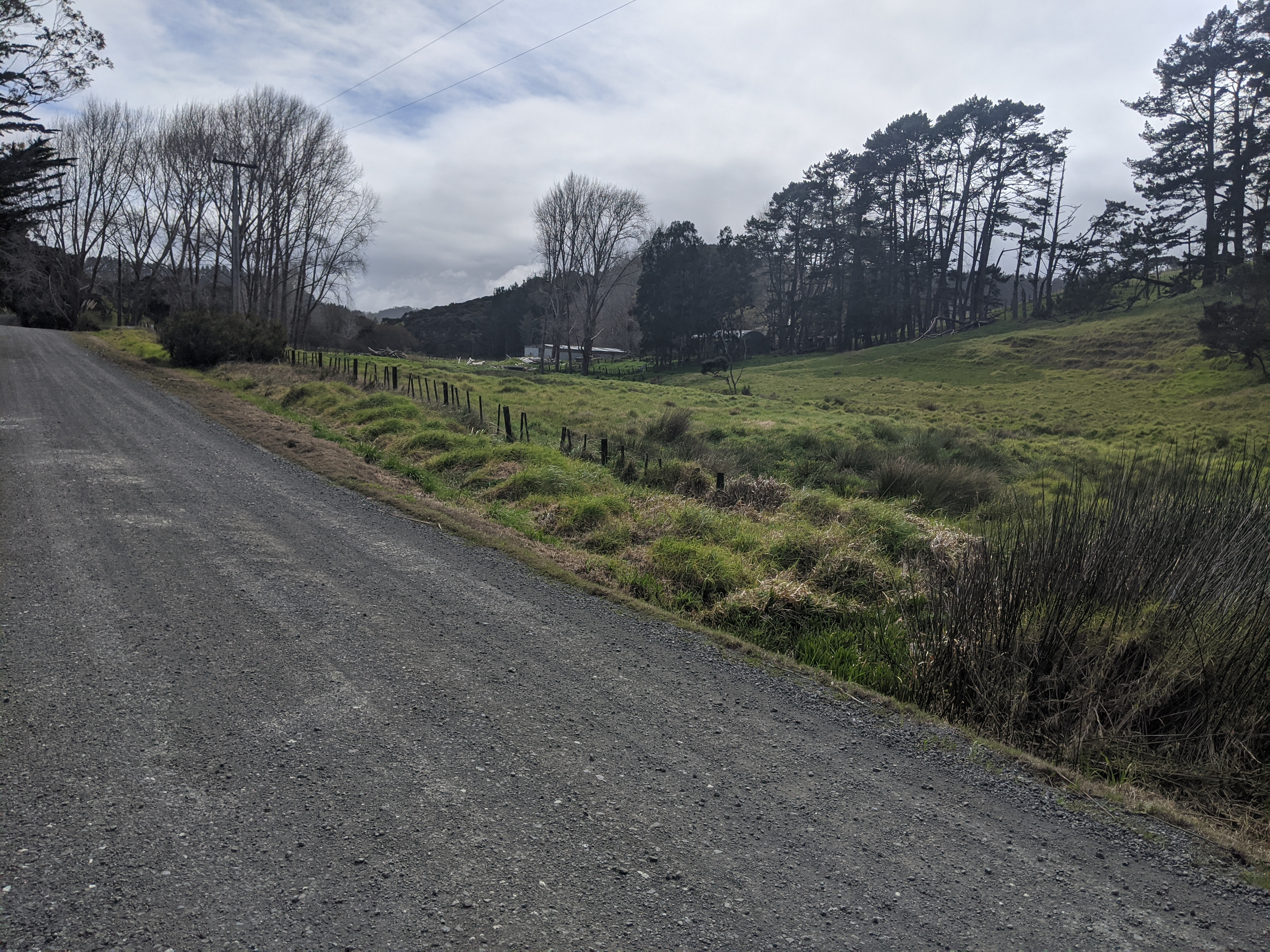
Waipatukahu Valley

Waipatukahu had a population of 1,626 in the 2023 New Zealand census, a decrease of 9 people (−0.6%) since the 2018 census, and an increase of 228 people (16.3%) since the 2013 census. There were 801 males, 819 females and 6 people of other genders in 549 dwellings. 3.0% of people identified as LGBTIQ+. The median age was 43.4 years (compared with 38.1 years nationally). There were 300 people (18.5%) aged under 15 years, 276 (17.0%) aged 15 to 29, 819 (50.4%) aged 30 to 64, and 234 (14.4%) aged 65 or older.

People could identify as more than one ethnicity. The results were 88.4% European (Pākehā); 15.7% Māori; 5.0% Pasifika; 3.9% Asian; 1.3% Middle Eastern, Latin American and African New Zealanders (MELAA); and 1.5% other, which includes people giving their ethnicity as "New Zealander". English was spoken by 98.2%, Māori language by 3.5%, Samoan by 0.7%, and other languages by 9.0%. No language could be spoken by 1.3% (e.g. too young to talk). New Zealand Sign Language was known by 0.6%. The percentage of people born overseas was 20.7, compared with 28.8% nationally.

Religious affiliations were 23.8% Christian, 0.7% Hindu, 0.4% Islam, 1.3% Māori religious beliefs, 0.4% Buddhist, 0.6% New Age, and 1.3% other religions. People who answered that they had no religion were 65.5%, and 6.6% of people did not answer the census question.

Of those at least 15 years old, 216 (16.3%) people had a bachelor's or higher degree, 756 (57.0%) had a post-high school certificate or diploma, and 273 (20.6%) people exclusively held high school qualifications. The median income was $46,200, compared with $41,500 nationally. 243 people (18.3%) earned over $100,000 compared to 12.1% nationally. The employment status of those at least 15 was that 705 (53.2%) people were employed full-time, 261 (19.7%) were part-time, and 36 (2.7%) were unemployed.
