= Waikoukou Valley =

Locality in New Zealand

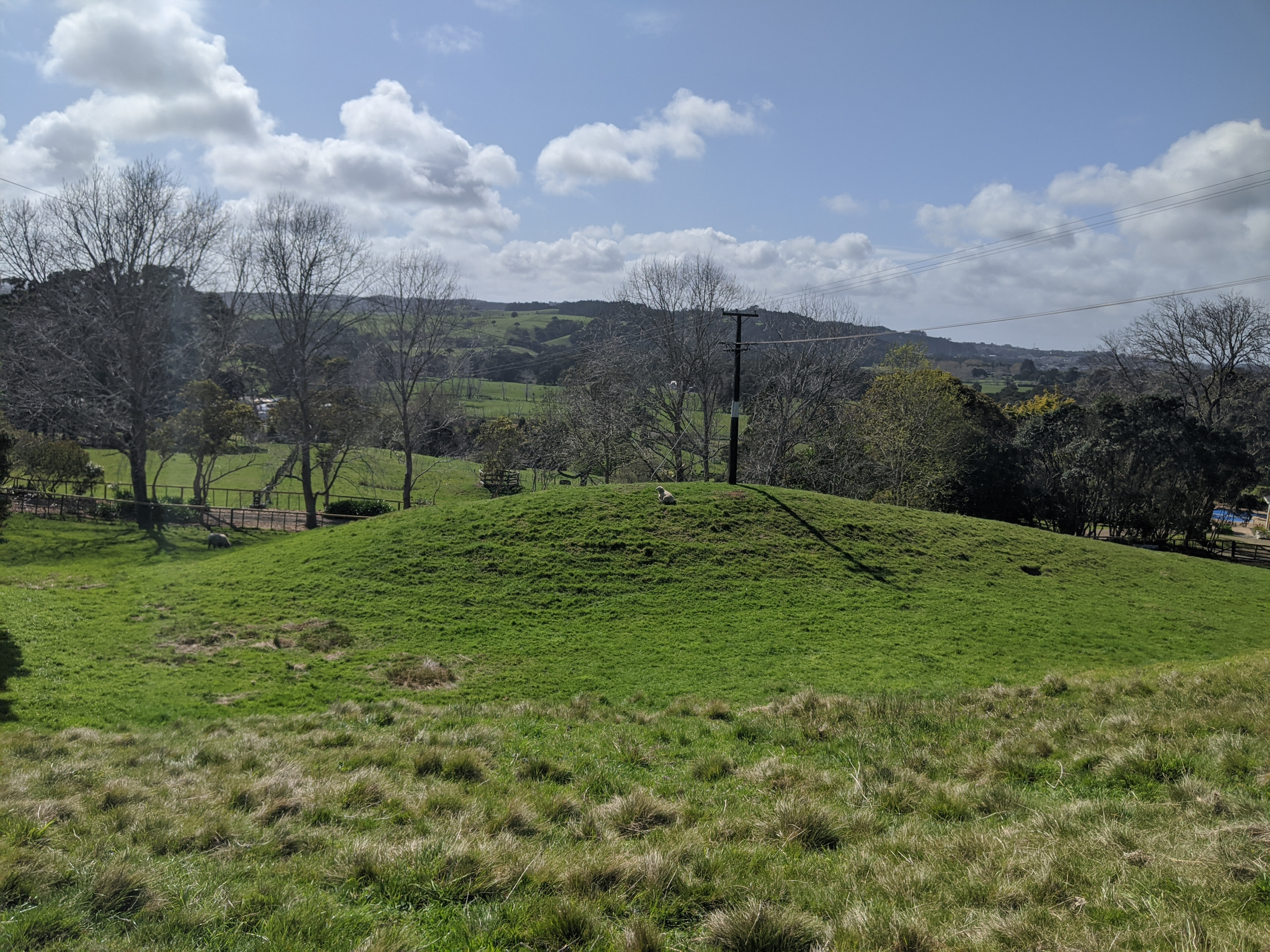
- Waikoukou Valley
- Interactive map of Waikoukou Valley
- Coordinates: 36.742°S 174.510°E
- Country: New Zealand
- Region: Auckland Region
- Ward: Rodney ward
- Community board: Rodney Local Board
- Subdivision: Kumeū subdivision
- Electorates: Kaipara ki Mahurangi; Te Tai Tokerau

Government
  - Territorial Authority: Auckland Council
  - Mayor of Auckland: Wayne Brown
  - Kaipara ki Mahurangi MP: Jessica Rowe
  - Te Tai Tokerau MP: TBD

Area
  - Total: 52.86 km^{2} (20.41 sq mi)

Population (June 2025)
  - Total: 1,810
  - Density: 34.2/km^{2} (88.7/sq mi)

Waikoukou Valley is a locality west of Auckland, in New Zealand. It was formed by Waikoukou Stream, which flows south through the Waitākere Ranges and is joined by Ararimu Stream before joining Kumeū River not far from its junction with Kaipara River. The major roads in the locality are Waikoukou Valley Road, Old North Road, Taylor Road and Peak Road.

The Matua vineyard occupies 31.68 ha of land in Waikoukou Valley.

"Wai" is the Māori word for water, and "koukou" is the morepork, an owl.

== History ==
The Tikokopu, Wharauroa and Waikoukou rivers were dammed in the 1800s to log kauri.

A post office was established at William Blake's premises in 1861. Blake was running a saw mill by 1862, but he moved to Taranaki in 1866, with the saw mill sold the following year. Milling continued by the Wilkins brothers until the 1880s.

A flax mill was operating by 1870.

Land use moved from extraction to dairy farming in the 1920s, although there was some debate on whether to replant trees towards the end of the decade. Electricity was supplied to the area in 1930.

== Demographics ==
Waikoukou Valley statistical area covers 52.86 km^{2} (20.41 sq mi) and had an estimated population of 1,810 as of June 2025, with a population density of 34 people per km^{2}.

Historical population
Year	Pop.	±% p.a.
2006	1,401	—
2013	1,518	+1.15%
2018	1,728	+2.63%
2023	1,749	+0.24%

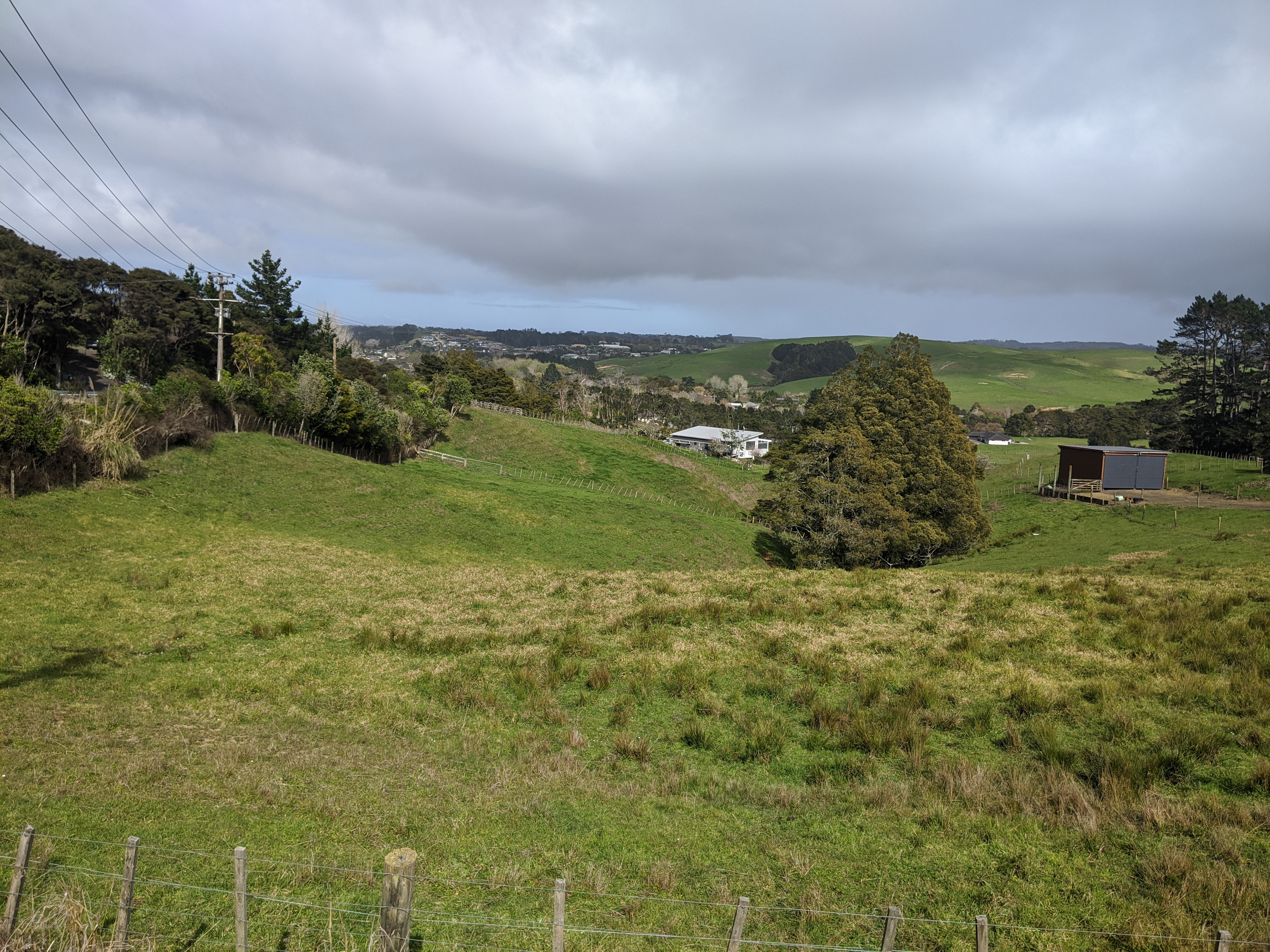
Waikoukou Valley with Waimauku visible in the distance

Waikoukou Valley had a population of 1,749 in the 2023 New Zealand census, an increase of 21 people (1.2%) since the 2018 census, and an increase of 231 people (15.2%) since the 2013 census. There were 885 males, 852 females and 12 people of other genders in 579 dwellings. 3.3% of people identified as LGBTIQ+. The median age was 44.9 years (compared with 38.1 years nationally). There were 306 people (17.5%) aged under 15 years, 318 (18.2%) aged 15 to 29, 873 (49.9%) aged 30 to 64, and 249 (14.2%) aged 65 or older.

People could identify as more than one ethnicity. The results were 94.5% European (Pākehā); 8.4% Māori; 2.2% Pasifika; 3.8% Asian; 0.5% Middle Eastern, Latin American and African New Zealanders (MELAA); and 2.1% other, which includes people giving their ethnicity as "New Zealander". English was spoken by 97.6%, Māori language by 0.5%, and other languages by 9.3%. No language could be spoken by 1.4% (e.g. too young to talk). New Zealand Sign Language was known by 0.5%. The percentage of people born overseas was 21.1, compared with 28.8% nationally.

Religious affiliations were 23.8% Christian, 0.3% Hindu, 0.2% Islam, 0.3% Buddhist, 0.3% New Age, 0.3% Jewish, and 1.2% other religions. People who answered that they had no religion were 65.9%, and 7.7% of people did not answer the census question.

Of those at least 15 years old, 264 (18.3%) people had a bachelor's or higher degree, 828 (57.4%) had a post-high school certificate or diploma, and 264 (18.3%) people exclusively held high school qualifications. The median income was $50,000, compared with $41,500 nationally. 306 people (21.2%) earned over $100,000 compared to 12.1% nationally. The employment status of those at least 15 was that 783 (54.3%) people were employed full-time, 243 (16.8%) were part-time, and 33 (2.3%) were unemployed.
