= Mangaiti =

Coordinates: 37.497°S 175.683°E

Mangaiti is a locality in the North Island of New Zealand. Mangaiti is 5 km (3.1 mi) north of Te Aroha.

== Etymology ==
Mangaiti means 'tiny stream' in the Maori language.

== Geography ==
Topographic map of Mangaiti; the large river is the Waihou

Mangaiti is 5 km (3.1 mi) north of Te Aroha.

== History ==
Flax mill at Mangaiti along the Waihou

The Maori ownership of the Aroha Block and Mangaiti have been disputed and contested since the original sale, with different iwi making contradicting claims to the land. Ngati Paeahi claimed Mangaiti to Te Aroha whilst Ngati Tamatera claimed the same land through right of conquest over Ngati Paeahi and Ngati Rahiri, which was disputed by the aforementioned tribes.

Mangaiti was the boundary of the Aroha Block. Ngati Rahiri opposed the sale of the Aroha Block and when Ngati Tamatera attempted to survey the boundary at Mangaiti Ngati Rahiri threatened to kill them. In one instance a Maori man was robbed while surveying the boundary.

Mangaiti was a stop on the Thames Branch Line. Mangaiti Station has been demolished with the Mangaiti Hall being the only structure remaining. A bridge was constructed in 1932 to cross the Mangaiti Stream to replace an earlier bridge, this bridge is still extant but unused.
