= Torlesse =

Torlesse is a surname. Notable people with the surname include:

- Arthur David Torlesse (1902–1995), Royal Navy officer
- Charles Torlesse (1825–1866), New Zealand surveyor
- Elizabeth Torlesse (1835–1922), New Zealand homemaker and community leader
