= Cities in New Zealand =

Map showing locations of urban areas in New Zealand

The word city took on two meanings in New Zealand after the local government reforms of 1989. Before the reforms, a borough that had a population of 20,000 or more could be proclaimed a city. The boundaries of councils tended to follow the edge of the built-up area, so there was little difference between the urban area and the local government area. In 1989, the structure of local government in New Zealand was significantly reorganised. Almost all the new district councils and city councils were much larger in land area, and they covered both urban land and the surrounding rural land. Many locations that once had a "city council" are now governed by a "district council". Since 2002, an urban area must have at least 50,000 residents to be proclaimed a city.

The word city is used in a general sense to identify the urban areas of New Zealand, independent of local body boundaries. This informal usage is jealously guarded. The district government of the town of Gisborne, for example, adamantly described itself as the first "city" in the world to see the new millennium. Gisborne is governed by a "district council", though its status as a city is not generally disputed in New Zealand. Similarly, there is no "city council" in Auckland, though its status as a city is not generally disputed due to its considerable size.

Listed below are the large urban areas referred to colloquially as "cities".

== Urban areas by population ==
=== Urban areas based on 2018 standard ===
Statistics New Zealand creates standards for statistical geographic areas that are the basis for determining population figures. Statistics New Zealand announced in 2017 that the Statistical Standard for Geographic Areas 2018 (SSGA18) would replace the New Zealand Standard Areas Classification 1992 (NZSAC92). The change impacted Wellington most, by splitting it into four urban areas, being the Wellington city and Lower Hutt city "major urban areas" and Porirua and Upper Hutt "large urban areas". As defined by SSGA18, Wellington approximately halved in size, and Lower Hutt entered the city rankings in sixth place between Tauranga and Dunedin.

The table below contains all "major urban areas" (100,000 or more residents) and all "large urban areas" (30,000 to 99,999 residents).

"Major" and "large" urban areas
Rank	Urban area	Population	Area (km^{2})	Population density (per km^{2})	Image
1	Auckland	1,547,200	605.67	2,554.5	Auckland, the largest city in New Zealand
2	Christchurch	407,800	294.43	1,385.0	Christchurch, the second largest city
3	Wellington	209,800	112.71	1,861.4	Wellington, the capital and third largest city
4	Hamilton	192,100	110.37	1,740.5	Hamilton
5	Tauranga	160,900	141.91	1,133.8	Tauranga
6	Lower Hutt	113,200	78.54	1,441.3	Lower Hutt
7	Dunedin	104,000	91.16	1,140.9	Dunedin
8	Palmerston North	81,200	77.05	1,053.9	Palmerston North
9	Hibiscus Coast	67,800	48.39	1,401.1	Gulf Harbour on the Hibiscus Coast
10	Napier	66,400	105.05	632.1	Napier
11	New Plymouth	60,200	74.79	804.9	New Plymouth
12	Porirua	60,100	61.19	982.2	Porirua
13	Rotorua	58,500	46.06	1,270.1	Rotorua
14	Whangārei	56,100	63.53	883.0	Looking westward towards central Whangārei from the Mount Parihaka lookout, with Te Matau A Pohe bridge and the suburb of Port Whangārei to the far left, the Discovery Settlers Hotel in the suburb of Regent to the far right, as well as Maungatapere and Te Tangihua in the background.
15	Invercargill	51,200	62.95	813.3	Invercargill
16	Nelson	50,800	54.69	928.9	Nelson
17	Hastings	49,800	26.29	1,894.3	Hastings
18	Upper Hutt	44,500	51.16	869.8	Upper Hutt
19	Whanganui	42,800	41.05	1,042.6	Whanganui
20	Gisborne	38,100	37.43	1,017.9	Gisborne

=== Functional urban areas (metropolitan areas) ===
Functional urban areas (FUAs) are geographic areas which represent the functional extent of major, large and medium urban areas, based on commuting patterns. Functional urban areas correspond to New Zealand's metropolitan areas.

Rank	Urban area	Population	Area (km^{2})	Urban areas included
1	Auckland	1,794,400	3,358.8	Auckland City, Hibiscus Coast, Pukekohe, Beachlands-Pine Harbour, Clarks Beach, Helensville, Kumeu-Huapai, Maraetai, Muriwai, Parakai, Patumāhoe, Pōkeno, Riverhead, Tuakau, Waimauku, Waiuku
2	Christchurch	556,500	2,408.1	Christchurch, Kaiapoi, Rangiora, Rolleston, Diamond Harbour, Leeston, Lincoln, Lyttelton, Pegasus, Prebbleton, West Melton, Woodend
3	Wellington	441,200	1,754.9	Wellington, Lower Hutt, Porirua, Upper Hutt, Featherston, Greytown
4	Hamilton	235,700	1,412.7	Hamilton, Ngāruawāhia
5	Tauranga	184,000	790.2	Tauranga, Ōmokoroa
6	Dunedin	131,600	1,033.8	Dunedin, Mosgiel, Brighton, Waikouaiti
7	Palmerston North	99,300	978.2	Palmerston North, Ashhurst
8	Whangārei	92,600	1,433.7	Whangarei, Hikurangi, Ngunguru, One Tree Point, Ruakākā
9	Nelson	89,100	1,177.2	Nelson, Richmond, Brightwater, Hope, Māpua, Wakefield
10	New Plymouth	88,300	920.9	New Plymouth, Inglewood, Ōakura, Waitara
11	Hastings	81,800	1,160.4	Hastings, Havelock North, Clive
12	Rotorua	72,800	649.1	Rotorua, Ngongotahā
13	Napier	68,900	260.0	Napier
14	Invercargill	58,000	428.5	Invercargill
15	Kāpiti Coast	49,900	317.4	Paraparaumu, Waikanae, Paekākāriki
16	Whanganui	48,100	598.1	Whanganui
17	Gisborne	43,600	612.8	Gisborne

== City councils ==
=== Populations of present-day city (and Auckland) councils ===
The populations given are the latest (June 2018) Statistics New Zealand estimated resident populations.

Rank	City council	Population	First proclaimed
1	Auckland	1,618,400	1871
2	Christchurch	380,200	1868
3	Wellington	209,000	1870
4	Hamilton	165,900	1936
5	Tauranga	140,800	1963
6	Dunedin	130,500	1865
7	Lower Hutt	107,600	1941
8	Palmerston North	87,300	1930
9	Napier	64,100	1950
10	Porirua	58,200	1965
11	Invercargill	55,800	1930
12	Nelson	52,400	1874
13	Upper Hutt	45,300	1966

Many cities were reorganised into districts by the Local Government Commission in 1989 under the Local Government Act 1974, for example Timaru. Other urban areas that are no longer cities, such as Rotorua and Whangārei, have higher populations than some present cities. The most recently proclaimed city is Tauranga, which became a city, for the second time, from 1 March 2004. Christchurch (1862 and 1868) and Invercargill (1930 and 1991) have also been declared cities more than once.

Under Section 27 of the Local Government Act 2002, a district may become a city by either a "reorganisation scheme" with the Local Government Commission, or under Section 27(1) it may apply for a change in status under Schedule 3, Clause 7. The new city must have "a population of not less than 50,000 persons", be "predominantly urban" and "a distinct entity and a major centre of activity within the region" (or regions) that it is encompassed by. Existing cities are grandfathered under Schedule 2, Part 2 of the Act. The only new city council so far under this section is the Tauranga City Council, from 1 March 2004.

Previously, under Section 37L of the Local Government Act 1974, new cities could only be formed from a "reorganisation scheme". The same criteria were used. The last city to be constituted under this section was Invercargill, which was re-reorganised into a city in 1991.

In 1991, the Lower Hutt City Council became the Hutt City Council by a special Act of Parliament which did not change the name of the city of Lower Hutt; the city's coat of arms still refers to the "City of Lower Hutt".

== History of cities ==
Prior to 1876, there was no official definition of a city or uniform system of local authorities in New Zealand. There is thus some argument over which settlement was the first city in New Zealand.

=== Letters patent ===
Traditionally in the United Kingdom (the former colonial power of New Zealand), city status is a special status granted by the monarch, usually by the issuing of letters patent. Between the 16th century and 1888, city status was associated with the presence of a diocesan cathedral. In 1841 the Diocese of New Zealand was established, based in Auckland, however no letters patent were ever issued. The Diocese of New Zealand was split in 1856 with the southern part becoming the Diocese of Christchurch. Christchurch was subsequently issued letters patent by Queen Victoria and became the "City of Christchurch". Despite the formation of other dioceses in New Zealand, the only other city to be subsequently issued letters patent was Nelson in 1858.

=== Electorates ===
Under the Provincial Councils Act 1851, the Governor had the right to establish electorates for provincial legislative councils. On 21 May 1852, Governor George Grey proclaimed electorates for New Ulster. Although the proclamation explicitly defined Auckland as a "town" for the purpose of property franchise, it later defined the electorate "City of Auckland". This ambiguous proclamation was the first official use of the term "city" in New Zealand legislation. The electorates of New Munster were also declared a short time later on 1 June. Likewise, Wellington was described as a town for property franchise, but more ambiguously established an electorate referred in different parts of the proclamation as either "City of Wellington" or "Town of Wellington". The provinces of New Ulster and New Munster were disestablished only a month later by the New Zealand Constitution Act 1852, however, the electorates of both "City of Auckland" and "City of Wellington" were carried forward to the first nationwide election of 1853.

=== City councils ===
The first municipal council to bear the title of "city council" was the Auckland City Council formed in 1854 by act of the Auckland Provincial Council. Following the election of an anti-taxation superintendent in March 1855, William Brown, the Auckland City Council was dissolved and formally disestablished 1856. A new Auckland City Council would be established in 1871, which was later was merged into Auckland Council in 2010.

The Christchurch City Council was formed by an act of the Canterbury Provincial Council which received Royal assent on 31 January 1863. The council has been active since and is therefore the longest continuously operating city council in New Zealand.

A legal oddity also provides Dunedin with a minor claim to being New Zealand's oldest city. Legal disputes over the powers that the Otago Provincial Council delegated to the newly formed Dunedin City Council in 1865, resulted in the central government stepping in and confirming its powers. Consequently, Dunedin City Council was the first council recognised in central government law. Furthermore, the central government passed legislation in 1868 to better regulate municipal councils across the country. Dunedin was already under the provisions and was therefore unaffected. The new act brought all other "city councils" in New Zealand under the central government regulations as "borough councils". The name change, however, was only due to an oversight in the language of the act and an amendment was made in November 1868 allowing some councils to revert to using the title of "city council". As the act, and therefore the brief name change, did not apply to Dunedin, Dunedin City Council can claim to have the longest continuous use of the title "city council".

=== Summary of claims as New Zealand's first city ===
Foundation Date	City	Basis of claim
1839	Wellington	First of New Zealand's modern cities to be settled
21 May 1852	Auckland	Electorate of "City of Auckland" established
6 February 1854	Auckland	First city council established (disestablished 1856 and not re-established until 1871)
31 July 1856	Christchurch	First settlement to receive city status by letters patent
31 January 1863	Christchurch	Longest continuously operating city council (name changed to Christchurch Borough Council between May and November 1868)
18 May 1865	Dunedin	Longest continuously operating municipal council to continuously use the title "city council"

=== Cities, 1877 to 1989 ===
The schedule of cities in New Zealand was brought under central government control in 1867, but continued to be sporadically applied. From 1886 the definition of a city was changed to any borough with a population of 20,000 or more. This value was increased to 50,000 in 1989.

Up to October 1989, the Local Government Commission undertook reorganisations of local government. As a result, some cities were reorganised into other larger cities or changed to districts, and some of these areas are still considered cities by many New Zealanders. This is a list as at c. 1986.

- North Island
  - Whangārei (1964)
  - Auckland
    - Auckland (1871)
    - East Coast Bays
    - Takapuna
    - Birkenhead
    - Waitemata (1974)
    - Mt Albert
    - Papatoetoe
    - Manukau (1965)
    - Papakura
    - Tamaki
  - Hamilton (1936)
  - New Plymouth (1949)
  - Tauranga (1963) (lost city status 1989, regained 2004)
    - Bethlehem
    - Mount Maunganui
    - Papamoa
    - Welcome Bay
  - Rotorua (1962, merged into Rotorua District, 1979)
  - Gisborne (1955)
  - Napier (1950)
  - Hastings (1956)
  - Wanganui (1924) (merged with surrounding counties to become Whanganui District, 1989)
  - Palmerston North (1930)
  - Wellington
    - Wellington (1870)
    - Upper Hutt (1966)
    - Lower Hutt (1941)
    - Porirua (1965)
- South Island
  - Nelson (1874)
  - Christchurch (1868)
  - Timaru (1948)
  - Dunedin (1865)
  - Invercargill (1930)

== See also ==
- List of statistical areas in New Zealand
- List of functional urban areas in New Zealand
- List of populated places in New Zealand
- List of cities in Oceania by population
- Territorial authorities of New Zealand
