= List of schools in the Canterbury Region =

Canterbury is a region in the South Island of New Zealand. It contains numerous rural primary schools, several small town primary and secondary schools, and big-city schools in Christchurch.

Due to the large number of schools in Christchurch, they are listed separately at List of schools in Christchurch. Schools in the Waitaki District which are located in the Canterbury part of the district are listed at List of schools in Otago.

In New Zealand schools, students begin formal education in Year 1 at the age of five. Year 13 is the final year of secondary education. Years 14 and 15 refer to adult education facilities.

State schools are those fully funded by the government and at which no fees can be charged, although a donation is commonly requested. A state integrated school is a state school with a special character based on a religious or philosophical belief.

Kura Kaupapa Māori are Māori immersion schools that are also state funded, but deliver their curriculum in the Māori language. There are two of these schools in Christchurch: Te Kura Kaupapa Māori o Te Whānau Tahi in Spreydon (Decile 3), and Te Kura Kaupapa Māori o Waitaha in Woolston (Decile 1).

The decile indicates the socio-economic group that the school catchment area falls into. A rating of 1 indicates a poor area; a rating of 10 a well-off one. The decile ratings used here come from the Ministry of Education Te Kete Ipurangi website and from the decile change spreadsheet listed in the references. The deciles were last revised using information from the 2006 Census. The roll of each school changes frequently as students start school for the first time, move between schools, and graduate. The rolls given here are those provided by the Ministry of Education, based on figures from July 2026. The Ministry of Education institution number, given in the last column, links to the Education Counts page for each school.

== Kaikoura District ==
The Kaikoura district is the northernmost district of the Canterbury region, and is home to 4,340 people. The district seat of Kaikōura (pop. 2,350) is the only significant urban area.

Name	MOE	Years	Area	Authority	Roll	Website	Notes
Hapuku School	3369	1–8	Hāpuku	State	16		
Kaikōura High School	307	7–13	Kaikōura	State	191		
Kaikoura Primary School	3391	1–6	Kaikōura	State	120		
Kaikoura Suburban School	3392	1–6	Kaikōura	State	54		
St Joseph's School	3530	1–8	Kaikōura	State integrated	110		Catholic

Former schools

- Woodbank School, Clarence – closed in December 2013 due to declining roll numbers
- Lynton Downs School – closed April 2017.

== Hurunui District ==
Name	Years	Area	Authority	Roll	Website	MOE
Amberley School	1–8	Amberley	State	244		3276
Amuri Area School	1–13	Culverden	State	348		308
Broomfield School	1–8	Broomfield	State	135		3303
Cheviot Area School	1–13	Cheviot	State	172		309
Greta Valley School	1–8	Greta Valley	State	35		3359
Hanmer Springs School	1–8	Hanmer Springs	State	97		3368
Hurunui College	1–13	Hawarden	State	190		311
Leithfield School	1–8	Leithfield	State	137	-	3411
Omihi School	1–8	Omihi	State	41	-	3454
Rotherham School	1–6	Rotherham	State	35		3490
Waiau School	1–6	Waiau	State	30		3566
Waikari School	1–8	Waikari	State	35	-	3569
Waipara School	1–8	Waipara	State	32	-	3576

== Waimakariri District ==
Name	MOE	Years	Area	Authority	Opened	Roll	Website	Notes
Ashgrove School	3284	1–8	Rangiora	State	1967	424		
Ashley School	3285	1–8	Ashley	State	1864	184		
Clarkville School	3321	1–8	Clarkville	State	1874	198		
Cust School	3325	1–8	Cust	State	1867	136		
Fernside School	3340	1–8	Fernside	State	1864	261		
Kaiapoi Borough School	3388	1–8	Kaiapoi	State	1873	372		
Kaiapoi High School	314	9–13	Kaiapoi	State	1972	1,059		
Kaiapoi North School	3389	1–8	Kaiapoi	State	1962	505		
Karanga Mai Young Parents College	2748	–	Kaiapoi	State	1992	0		Teen parent unit
Loburn School	3419	1–8	Loburn	State	1869	173		
North Loburn School	3447	1–8	Loburn	State	1882	80		
Ohoka School	3451	1–8	Kaiapoi	State		220		
Oxford Area School	310	1–13	Oxford	State		468		
Pegasus Bay School	3570	1–8	Pegasus Town	State	1872	419		
Rangiora Borough School	3481	1–8	Rangiora	State	1873	314		
Rangiora High School	312	9–13	Rangiora	State	1884	1,680		
Rangiora New Life School	418	1–13	Southbrook	State integrated	1979	467		Nondenominational Christian
Sefton School	3501	1–8	Sefton	State	1884	121		
Southbrook School	3510	1–8	Southbrook	State	1874	253		
St Joseph's School	4132	1–8	Rangiora	State integrated	1887	177		Catholic
St Patrick's School	3540	1–8	Kaiapoi	State integrated		196		Catholic
Swannanoa School	3547	1–8	Swannanoa	State		297		
Te Matauru Primary	572	1–8	Rangiora	State	2020	240		
Tuahiwi School	3563	1–8	Tuahiwi	State		183		
View Hill School	3565	1–8	Oxford	State		69		
West Eyreton School	3586	1–8	West Eyreton	State		185		
Woodend School	3600	1–8	Woodend	State		585		

=== Former schools ===
- Okuku School, closed in 1987, students moved to Loburn School.
- Waikuku School, state full primary at Waikuku, relocated to Pegasus Town in April–May 2014 and renamed Pegasus Bay School.

== Selwyn District ==
Name	MOE	Years	Location	Authority	Opened	Roll	Website	Notes
Ararira Springs Primary School	585	1–8	Lincoln	State	2019	527		
Broadfield School	3301	1–8	Broadfield	State		146		
Burnham School	3304	1–8	Burnham	State		184		
Clearview Primary School	6980	1–8	Rolleston	State	2010	833		
Darfield High School	346	7–13	Darfield	State		815		
Darfield School	3326	1–6	Darfield	State		310		
Dunsandel School	3331	1–6	Dunsandel	State		128		
Ellesmere College	349	7–13	Leeston	State		571		
Glentunnel School	3352	1–6	Glentunnel	State		101		
Greendale School	3357	1–6	Greendale	State		32	-	
Hororata School	3381	1–6	Hororata	State		71		
Kirwee Model School	3397	1–6	Kirwee	State		145		
Ladbrooks School	3402	1–8	Ladbrooks	State		134		
Leeston School	3410	1–6	Leeston	State		309		
Lemonwood Grove School	6967	1–8	Rolleston	State	2017	1,147		
Lincoln High School	347	9–13	Lincoln	State		1,430		
Lincoln Primary School	3412	1–8	Lincoln	State		832		
Prebbleton School	3478	1–8	Prebbleton	State		548		
Rolleston College	654	9–13	Rolleston	State	2017	1,968		
Rolleston School	3488	1–8	Rolleston	State	1893	728		
Rolleston Christian School	710	1–8	Rolleston	State integrated	2015	277		Nondenominational Christian
Sheffield Contributing School	3502	1–6	Sheffield and Waddington	State		89		
Southbridge School	3509	1–6	Southbridge	State		124		
Springfield School	3515	1–6	Springfield	State		41	-	
Springston School	3516	1–8	Springston	State		237		
Tai Tapu School	3549	1–8	Tai Tapu	State		269		
Waitaha School	3554		Rolleston	State		125		Special needs school
Weedons School	3585	1–8	Weedons	State		154		
West Melton School	3587	1–8	West Melton	State		486		
West Rolleston Primary School	584	1–8	Rolleston	State	2016	751		
Windwhistle School	3597	1–6	Darfield	State		31		

== Ashburton District ==
The Ashburton District covers the area between the Rakaia River and the Rangitata River, and is home to 37,400 people. Ashburton (pop. 21,600) is the district seat and by far the largest town, with significant other towns including Methven (pop. c.1350) and Rakaia (pop. c. 1000).

Name	Years	Gender	Area	Authority	Decile	Roll	Website	MOE
Allenton School	1–6	Coed	Ashburton	State	8	437		3274
Ashburton Borough School	1–8	Coed	Ashburton	State	7	248		3281
Ashburton Christian School	1–8	Coed	Elgin	State integrated	10	261		608
Ashburton College	9–13	Coed	Ashburton	State	7	1,391		351
Ashburton Intermediate	7–8	Coed	Ashburton	State	6	436		3282
Ashburton Netherby School	1–6	Coed	Netherby	State	3	189		3283
Carew Peel Forest School	1–6	Coed	Carew	State	10	78		3308
Chertsey School	1–6	Coed	Chertsey	State	6	36		3313
Dorie School	1–8	Coed	Rakaia	State	9	62		3329
Fairton School	1–6	Coed	Ashburton	State	6	31		3336
Hampstead School	1–6	Coed	Ashburton	State	4	309		3367
Hinds School	1–8	Coed	Hinds	State	9	173		3375
Lauriston School	1–6	Coed	Lauriston	State	9	95		3407
Longbeach School	1–8	Coed	Willowby	State	9	166		3594
Mayfield School	1–8	Coed	Mayfield	State	9	108		3432
Methven School	1–6	Coed	Methven	State	9	289		3436
Mount Hutt College	7–13	Coed	Methven	State	9	561		348
Mt Somers Springburn School	1–8	Coed	Mount Somers	State	10	78		3441
Our Lady of Snows School	1–8	Coed	Methven	State integrated	10	41		3462
Rakaia School	1–8	Coed	Rakaia	State	4	195		3480
St Joseph's School	1–8	Coed	Ashburton	State integrated	8	244		3527
Tinwald School	1–6	Coed	Tinwald	State	6	263		3561
Wakanui School	1–8	Coed	Wakanui	State	8	94		3580

=== Former schools ===
- Lowcliffe School - full primary school, closed October 2011 due to declining roll numbers.
- Pendarves School - years 1–6, closed in the late 20th century due to declining roll numbers. Pendarves School children were moved to Chertsey School when it closed.

== Timaru District ==
Name	Years	Gender	Area	Authority	Decile	Roll	Website	MOE
Arowhenua Maori School	1–8	Coed	Arowhenua	State	4	40		3280
Barton Rural School	1–8	Coed	Fairview	State	8	185		2112
Beaconsfield School	1–8	Coed	Pareora West	State	8	120		2114
Bluestone School	1–8	Coed	West End	State	5	471		2113
Craighead Diocesan School	7–13	Girls	Highfield	State integrated	9	410		357
Geraldine High School	7–13	Coed	Geraldine	State	8	593		352
Geraldine Primary School	1–6	Coed	Geraldine	State	8	269	–	2107
Gleniti School	1–8	Coed	Gleniti	State	10	376		3347
Grantlea Downs School	1–8	Coed	Marchwiel	State	4	302		2111
Highfield School	1–8	Coed	Highfield	State	7	307		3373
Mountainview High School	9–13	Coed	Marchwiel	State	6	440		359
Oceanview Heights School	1–8	Coed	Marchwiel	State	2	103		2110
Opihi College	7–13	Coed	Temuka	State	5	280		354
Pleasant Point Primary School	1–8	Coed	Pleasant Point	State	8	238		3477
Roncalli College	9–13	Coed	Parkside	State integrated	6	517		358
Sacred Heart School	1–8	Coed	Timaru Central	State integrated	5	227		3498
St Joseph's School (Pleasant Point)	1–8	Coed	Pleasant Point	State integrated	7	47		3528
St Joseph's School (Temuka)	1–8	Coed	Temuka	State integrated	5	106		3532
St Joseph's School (Timaru)	1–8	Coed	Marchwiel	State integrated	7	213		3533
Temuka Primary School	1–6	Coed	Temuka	State	5	205		2109
Timaru Boys' High School	9–13	Boys	West End	State	7	808		360
Timaru Christian School	1–10	Coed	Watlington	State integrated	8	160		1611
Timaru Girls' High School	9–13	Girls	Parkside	State	5	489		361
Timaru South School	1–8	Coed	Parkside	State	3	200		2115
Waihi School	4–8	Coed	Winchester	Private	9	137		4147
Waimataitai School	1–8	Coed	Waimataitai	State	7	463		3572
Winchester Rural School	1–6	Coed	Winchester	State	5	216		2108
Woodbury School	1–6	Coed	Woodbury	State	9	115		3599

== Mackenzie District ==
Name	Years	Gender	Area	Authority	Decile	Roll	Website	MOE
Albury School	1–6	Coed	Albury	State	8	24		3273
Aoraki Mount Cook School	1–8	Coed	Mount Cook Village	State	10	5		3442
Cannington School	1–8	Coed	Cave	State	9	20	-	3307
Fairlie School	1–6	Coed	Fairlie	State	7	137		3335
Lake Tekapo School	1–6	Coed	Lake Tekapo	State	7	36	-	3406
Mackenzie College	7–13	Coed	Fairlie	State	7	194		353
St Joseph's School	1–8	Coed	Fairlie	State integrated	7	26		3529
Twizel Area School	1–13	Coed	Twizel	State	8	251		527

=== Former schools ===
- Twizel Primary School, a contributing primary (Year 1–6) school, and Twizel High School, a Year 7–13 secondary school. The schools opened in Twizel in 1970 and 1971 respectively, primarily to serve the children of workers building the Upper Waitaki hydroelectric scheme. After the scheme was completed in 1985 and the workers moved on, the two separate schools were no longer needed, and in 1986 were merged on the High School site to form Twizel Area School.

== Waimate District ==
Name	Years	Gender	Area	Authority	Decile	Roll	Website	MOE
Glenavy School	1–8	Coed	Glenavy	State	9	121		3348
Makikihi School	1–8	Coed	Makikihi	State	7	44		3426
St Andrew's School	1–8	Coed	Saint Andrews	State	5	82		3519
St Patrick's School	1–8	Coed	Waimate	State integrated	3	30		3539
Waihao Downs School	1–6	Coed	Waihao Downs	State	8	75		3567
Waimate Centennial School	1–6	Coed	Waimate	State	3	136		3573
Waimate High School	7–13	Coed	Waimate	State	4	293		362
Waimate Main School	1–6	Coed	Waimate	State	2	84		3574
Waituna Creek School	1–8	Coed	Waituna	State	5	30		3579

=== Former schools ===
- Morven School - full primary school, closed 2016 due to declining roll numbers.
- Waihaorunga School - full primary school, closed 2010 due to declining roll numbers.
