= Glenwood, New Zealand =

Glenwood
- Suburb
- Interactive map of Glenwood
- Coordinates: 44.389°S 171.210°E
- Country: New Zealand
- City: Timaru
- Local authority: Timaru District Council
- Electoral ward: Timaru

Area
  - Land: 109 ha (270 acres)

Population (June 2025)
  - Total: 1,990
  - Density: 1,830/km^{2} (4,730/sq mi)

Gleniti		Marchwiel, New Zealand
	Glenwood	Highfield
		West End

Glenwood is a suburb of Timaru, in the South Canterbury area and Canterbury region of New Zealand's South Island. It is located west of the town centre.

== Demographics ==
Glenwood covers 1.09 km^{2} (0.42 sq mi) and had an estimated population of 1,990 as of June 2025, with a population density of 1,826 people per km^{2}.

Historical population
Year	Pop.	±% p.a.
2006	1,656	—
2013	1,755	+0.83%
2018	1,788	+0.37%
2023	1,884	+1.05%

Glenwood had a population of 1,884 in the 2023 New Zealand census, an increase of 96 people (5.4%) since the 2018 census, and an increase of 129 people (7.4%) since the 2013 census. There were 912 males, 966 females, and 6 people of other genders in 735 dwellings. 2.4% of people identified as LGBTIQ+. The median age was 39.4 years (compared with 38.1 years nationally). There were 417 people (22.1%) aged under 15 years, 267 (14.2%) aged 15 to 29, 810 (43.0%) aged 30 to 64, and 393 (20.9%) aged 65 or older.

People could identify as more than one ethnicity. The results were 81.7% European (Pākehā); 10.4% Māori; 5.7% Pasifika; 9.9% Asian; 1.8% Middle Eastern, Latin American and African New Zealanders (MELAA); and 2.2% other, which includes people giving their ethnicity as "New Zealander". English was spoken by 95.7%, Māori by 1.8%, Samoan by 0.8%, and other languages by 12.1%. No language could be spoken by 1.9% (e.g. too young to talk). New Zealand Sign Language was known by 0.3%. The percentage of people born overseas was 20.1, compared with 28.8% nationally.

Religious affiliations were 40.0% Christian, 1.6% Hindu, 1.0% Islam, 0.5% Māori religious beliefs, 0.8% Buddhist, 0.2% New Age, and 0.8% other religions. People who answered that they had no religion were 48.2%, and 6.8% of people did not answer the census question.

Of those at least 15 years old, 228 (15.5%) people had a bachelor's or higher degree, 831 (56.6%) had a post-high school certificate or diploma, and 408 (27.8%) people exclusively held high school qualifications. The median income was $39,300, compared with $41,500 nationally. 99 people (6.7%) earned over $100,000 compared to 12.1% nationally. The employment status of those at least 15 was 705 (48.1%) full-time, 213 (14.5%) part-time, and 33 (2.2%) unemployed.
