= Seaview, Canterbury =

Seaview
- Suburb
- Interactive map of Seaview
- Coordinates: 44.397°S 171.242°E
- Country: New Zealand
- City: Timaru
- Local authority: Timaru District Council
- Electoral ward: Timaru

Area
  - Land: 75 ha (190 acres)

Population (June 2025)
  - Total: 2,250
  - Density: 3,000/km^{2} (7,800/sq mi)

Highfield	Waimataitai	Port Timaru
West End	Seaview	Timaru Central
Watlington	Parkside

Seaview is a suburb of Timaru, in the South Canterbury area and Canterbury region of New Zealand's South Island. It is located immediately west of the town centre.

== Demographics ==
Seaview covers 0.75 km^{2} (0.29 sq mi) and had an estimated population of 2,250 as of June 2025, with a population density of 3,000 people per km^{2}.

Historical population
Year	Pop.	±% p.a.
2006	2,178	—
2013	2,091	−0.58%
2018	2,145	+0.51%
2023	2,115	−0.28%
The 2006 population is for a smaller area of 0.73 km^{2}. Source:

Seaview had a population of 2,115 in the 2023 New Zealand census, a decrease of 30 people (−1.4%) since the 2018 census, and an increase of 24 people (1.1%) since the 2013 census. There were 1,047 males, 1,059 females, and 9 people of other genders in 996 dwellings. 3.4% of people identified as LGBTIQ+. The median age was 41.0 years (compared with 38.1 years nationally). There were 336 people (15.9%) aged under 15 years, 414 (19.6%) aged 15 to 29, 903 (42.7%) aged 30 to 64, and 459 (21.7%) aged 65 or older.

People could identify as more than one ethnicity. The results were 78.6% European (Pākehā); 12.5% Māori; 5.1% Pasifika; 10.5% Asian; 1.7% Middle Eastern, Latin American and African New Zealanders (MELAA); and 3.0% other, which includes people giving their ethnicity as "New Zealander". English was spoken by 97.2%, Māori by 3.0%, Samoan by 3.0%, and other languages by 9.8%. No language could be spoken by 1.4% (e.g. too young to talk). New Zealand Sign Language was known by 0.7%. The percentage of people born overseas was 20.7, compared with 28.8% nationally.

Religious affiliations were 34.0% Christian, 1.4% Hindu, 1.4% Islam, 0.4% Māori religious beliefs, 0.6% Buddhist, 0.3% New Age, and 2.1% other religions. People who answered that they had no religion were 50.6%, and 9.1% of people did not answer the census question.

Of those at least 15 years old, 273 (15.3%) people had a bachelor's or higher degree, 933 (52.4%) had a post-high school certificate or diploma, and 570 (32.0%) people exclusively held high school qualifications. The median income was $36,000, compared with $41,500 nationally. 99 people (5.6%) earned over $100,000 compared to 12.1% nationally. The employment status of those at least 15 was 882 (49.6%) full-time, 240 (13.5%) part-time, and 33 (1.9%) unemployed.
