= Timaru Central =

- Suburb
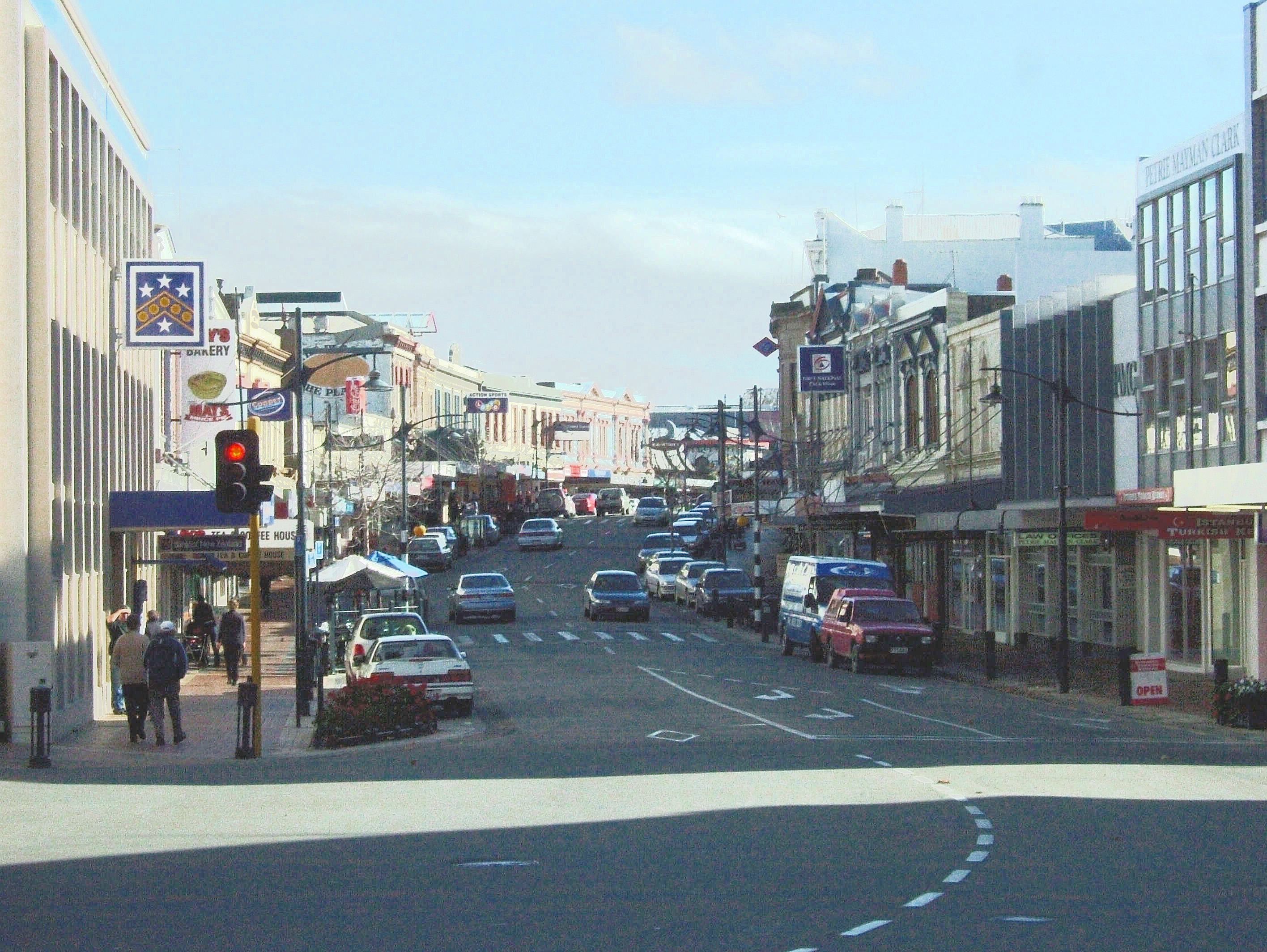
- Stafford Street
- Interactive map of Timaru Central
- Coordinates: 44.398°S 171.252°E
- Country: New Zealand
- City: Timaru
- Local authority: Timaru District Council
- Electoral ward: Timaru

Area
  - Land: 81 ha (200 acres)

Population (June 2025)
  - Total: 310
  - Density: 380/km^{2} (990/sq mi)

Waimataitai		Port Timaru
Seaview	Timaru Central
	Parkside

Timaru Central is the central business district of Timaru, in the South Canterbury area and Canterbury region of New Zealand's South Island.

== Demographics ==
Timaru Central covers 0.81 km^{2} (0.31 sq mi) and had an estimated population of 310 as of June 2025, with a population density of 383 people per km^{2}.

Historical population
Year	Pop.	±% p.a.
2006	420	—
2013	366	−1.95%
2018	345	−1.17%
2023	285	−3.75%
The 2006 population is for a larger area of 0.82 km^{2}. Source:

Timaru Central had a population of 285 in the 2023 New Zealand census, a decrease of 60 people (−17.4%) since the 2018 census, and a decrease of 81 people (−22.1%) since the 2013 census. There were 168 males and 114 females in 147 dwellings. 4.2% of people identified as LGBTIQ+. The median age was 38.5 years (compared with 38.1 years nationally). There were 33 people (11.6%) aged under 15 years, 63 (22.1%) aged 15 to 29, 150 (52.6%) aged 30 to 64, and 39 (13.7%) aged 65 or older.

People could identify as more than one ethnicity. The results were 70.5% European (Pākehā); 18.9% Māori; 13.7% Pasifika; 10.5% Asian; 1.1% Middle Eastern, Latin American and African New Zealanders (MELAA); and 2.1% other, which includes people giving their ethnicity as "New Zealander". English was spoken by 96.8%, Māori by 2.1%, Samoan by 5.3%, and other languages by 12.6%. No language could be spoken by 2.1% (e.g. too young to talk). The percentage of people born overseas was 23.2, compared with 28.8% nationally.

Religious affiliations were 30.5% Christian, 2.1% Hindu, 1.1% New Age, and 1.1% other religions. People who answered that they had no religion were 56.8%, and 7.4% of people did not answer the census question.

Of those at least 15 years old, 21 (8.3%) people had a bachelor's or higher degree, 144 (57.1%) had a post-high school certificate or diploma, and 81 (32.1%) people exclusively held high school qualifications. The median income was $47,400, compared with $41,500 nationally. 15 people (6.0%) earned over $100,000 compared to 12.1% nationally. The employment status of those at least 15 was 153 (60.7%) full-time, 30 (11.9%) part-time, and 12 (4.8%) unemployed.

== Education ==
Sacred Heart School is a Catholic state-integrated primary school for years 1 to 10 with a roll of 227 as of July 2026. It opened in 1882 as Marist Brothers School, and became Sacred Heart School in the 1980s after a merger with Sacred Heart Girls' School (established 1879).
