= Watlington, New Zealand =

Watlington
- Suburb
- Interactive map of Watlington
- Coordinates: 44.405°S 171.234°E
- Country: New Zealand
- City: Timaru
- Local authority: Timaru District Council
- Electoral ward: Timaru

Area
  - Land: 121 ha (300 acres)

Population (June 2025)
  - Total: 2,390
  - Density: 1,980/km^{2} (5,120/sq mi)

	West End	Seaview
	Watlington	Parkside
Fairview		Kensington

Watlington is a suburb of Timaru, in the South Canterbury area and Canterbury region of New Zealand's South Island. It is located southwest of the town centre.

Talbot Park was an aged-care hospital-level facility in Watlington for over a century, until it closed in May 2021.

== Demographics ==
Watlington covers 1.21 km^{2} (0.47 sq mi) and had an estimated population of 2,390 as of June 2025, with a population density of 1,975 people per km^{2}.

Historical population
Year	Pop.	±% p.a.
2006	2,253	—
2013	2,298	+0.28%
2018	2,253	−0.39%
2023	2,256	+0.03%

Watlington had a population of 2,256 in the 2023 New Zealand census, an increase of 3 people (0.1%) since the 2018 census, and a decrease of 42 people (−1.8%) since the 2013 census. There were 1,125 males, 1,125 females, and 6 people of other genders in 915 dwellings. 3.2% of people identified as LGBTIQ+. The median age was 38.1 years (compared with 38.1 years nationally). There were 453 people (20.1%) aged under 15 years, 390 (17.3%) aged 15 to 29, 1,026 (45.5%) aged 30 to 64, and 384 (17.0%) aged 65 or older.

People could identify as more than one ethnicity. The results were 84.4% European (Pākehā); 12.8% Māori; 6.6% Pasifika; 5.5% Asian; 0.1% Middle Eastern, Latin American and African New Zealanders (MELAA); and 2.1% other, which includes people giving their ethnicity as "New Zealander". English was spoken by 97.2%, Māori by 2.3%, Samoan by 2.4%, and other languages by 7.0%. No language could be spoken by 2.3% (e.g. too young to talk). New Zealand Sign Language was known by 0.8%. The percentage of people born overseas was 16.2, compared with 28.8% nationally.

Religious affiliations were 34.4% Christian, 0.7% Hindu, 0.9% Islam, 0.4% Māori religious beliefs, 0.9% New Age, and 0.7% other religions. People who answered that they had no religion were 52.1%, and 9.8% of people did not answer the census question.

Of those at least 15 years old, 216 (12.0%) people had a bachelor's or higher degree, 1,086 (60.2%) had a post-high school certificate or diploma, and 495 (27.5%) people exclusively held high school qualifications. The median income was $41,500, compared with $41,500 nationally. 105 people (5.8%) earned over $100,000 compared to 12.1% nationally. The employment status of those at least 15 was 963 (53.4%) full-time, 228 (12.6%) part-time, and 39 (2.2%) unemployed.

== Education ==
Timaru Christian School is a non-denominational state integrated school for years 1 to 10 with a roll of 160 as of July 2026. It opened in 1996, and moved to the current site about 2009. The site was formerly occupied by Watlington Intermediate, which opened in 1974 and closed in 2004.
