= Marchwiel, New Zealand =

Marchwiel
- Suburb
- Interactive map of Marchwiel
- Coordinates: 44°22′38″S 171°13′40″E
- Country: New Zealand
- City: Timaru
- Local authority: Timaru District Council
- Electoral ward: Timaru

Area
  - Land: 177 ha (440 acres)

Population (June 2025)
  - Total: 3,730
  - Density: 2,110/km^{2} (5,460/sq mi)
- Postcode: 7910

		Washdyke
Gleniti	Marchwiel
Glenwood	Highfield	Waimataitai

Marchwiel is a suburb of Timaru, Canterbury, New Zealand. It is one of 24 suburbs within the Timaru District.

Marchwiel is in the Rangitata parliamentary electorate and is represented by Jo Luxton of the New Zealand Labour Party.

== History ==
In 1879, the Marchwiel Estate was sold by Philip Bouverie Luxmoore, as reported by The Timaru Herald. The estate was named for Luxmoore's home village of Marchwiel, North Wales. Luxmoore lends his name to Luxmoore Road and the St. Philip and All Saints Anglican Church in the suburb. The estate was destroyed in a fire in the 1960s.

== Demographics ==
Marchwiel covers 1.77 km^{2} (0.68 sq mi). It had an estimated population of 3,730 as of June 2025, with a population density of 2,107 people per km^{2}.

Historical population
Year	Pop.	±% p.a.
2006	3,231	—
2013	3,267	+0.16%
2018	3,507	+1.43%
2023	3,567	+0.34%

Marchwiel had a population of 3,567 in the 2023 New Zealand census, an increase of 60 people (1.7%) since the 2018 census, and an increase of 300 people (9.2%) since the 2013 census. There were 1,749 males, 1,803 females, and 15 people of other genders in 1,398 dwellings. 2.6% of people identified as LGBTIQ+. The median age was 38.5 years (compared with 38.1 years nationally). There were 684 people (19.2%) aged under 15 years, 654 (18.3%) aged 15 to 29, 1,482 (41.5%) aged 30 to 64, and 750 (21.0%) aged 65 or older.

People could identify as more than one ethnicity. The results were 83.2% European (Pākehā); 11.6% Māori; 5.9% Pasifika; 7.8% Asian; 0.5% Middle Eastern, Latin American and African New Zealanders (MELAA); and 1.5% other, which includes people giving their ethnicity as "New Zealander". English was spoken by 96.0%, Māori by 2.2%, Samoan by 1.9%, and other languages by 9.0%. No language could be spoken by 2.1% (e.g. too young to talk). New Zealand Sign Language was known by 0.5%. The percentage of people born overseas was 16.1, compared with 28.8% nationally.

Religious affiliations were 36.8% Christian, 1.5% Hindu, 0.3% Islam, 0.3% Māori religious beliefs, 0.1% Buddhist, 0.7% New Age, and 1.3% other religions. People who answered that they had no religion were 51.4%, and 7.7% of people did not answer the census question.

Of those at least 15 years old, 288 (10.0%) people had a bachelor's or higher degree, 1,596 (55.4%) had a post-high school certificate or diploma, and 1,011 (35.1%) people exclusively held high school qualifications. The median income was $35,100, compared with $41,500 nationally. 120 people (4.2%) earned over $100,000 compared to 12.1% nationally. The employment status of those at least 15 was 1,356 (47.0%) full-time, 318 (11.0%) part-time, and 87 (3.0%) unemployed.

Individual statistical areas
Name	Area (km^{2})	Population	Density (per km^{2})	Dwellings	Median age	Median income
Marchwiel West	0.84	1,563	1,861	645	39.2 years	$36,200
Marchwiel East	0.93	2,007	2,158	753	37.9 years	$34,000
New Zealand					38.1 years	$41,500

== Education ==
Mountainview High School is a secondary school serving years 9 to 13 with a roll of 440 students. It started as Timaru Technical School in 1901, and was renamed Timaru Technical College in 1918. In 1934, it was renamed again to Timaru Technical High School, and in 1967 it became Timaru College. It was divided in 1984 into a technical institute (later called Aoraki Polytechnic) and a secondary school, Mountainview High, on a new site.

Oceanview Heights School and Grantlea Downs School are full primary schools serving years 1 to 8 with rolls of 103 and 302 students, respectively. Oceanview Heights was formed in 2004 from the merger of Marchwiel School (established 1950) with Washdyke School (established 1874). Grantlea Downs was formed in 2005 when Grantlea School (established 1959) merged with Seadown School (established 1890).

St Joseph's School is a state-integrated Catholic primary serving years 1 to 8 with a roll of 213. St Joseph's started in 1939, merging in 1970 with St Mary's, another Catholic school opened in 1958, forming senior and junior campuses on the two sites. The school became integrated into the state system in 1983 and the sites were combined in 1984.

All these schools are co-educational. Rolls are as of July 2026.
