= West End, New Zealand =

West End
- Suburb
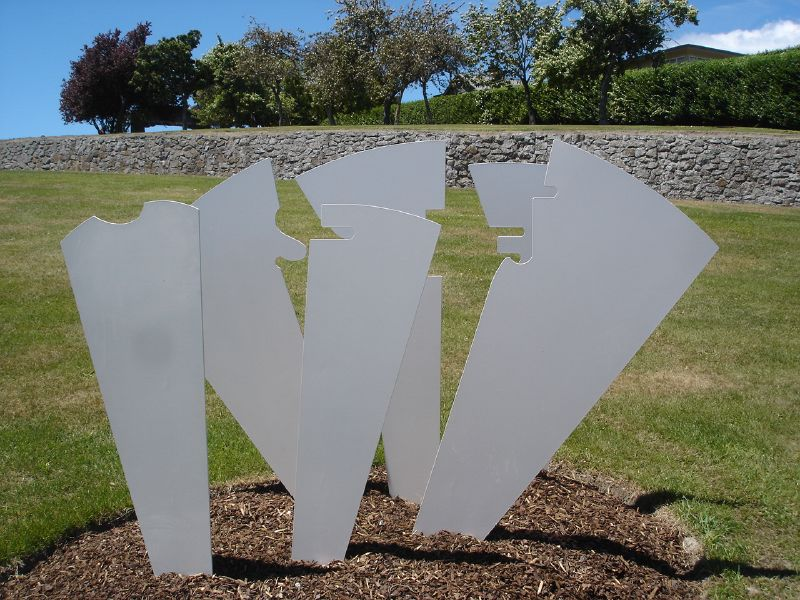
- The Shortest Day, a sculpture in Centennial Park
- Interactive map of West End
- Coordinates: 44.396°S 171.230°E
- Country: New Zealand
- City: Timaru
- Local authority: Timaru District Council
- Electoral ward: Timaru

Area
  - Land: 122 ha (300 acres)

Population (June 2025)
  - Total: 2,920
  - Density: 2,390/km^{2} (6,200/sq mi)

| Highfield | | Waimataitai |
| | West End | Seaview |
| | Watlington | Parkside |

West End is a suburb of Timaru, in the South Canterbury area and Canterbury region of New Zealand's South Island. It is located west of the town centre.

The suburb contains a multi-sport stadium called Fraser Park, which was branded as Alpine Energy Stadium.

== Demographics ==
The statistical area of Fraser Park, which corresponds to West End, covers 1.22 km^{2} (0.47 sq mi) and had an estimated population of 2,920 as of June 2025, with a population density of 2,393 people per km^{2}.

Historical population
| Year | Pop. | ±% p.a. |
|---|---|---|
| 2006 | 2,679 | — |
| 2013 | 2,685 | +0.03% |
| 2018 | 2,751 | +0.49% |
| 2023 | 2,835 | +0.60% |

Fraser Park had a population of 2,835 in the 2023 New Zealand census, an increase of 84 people (3.1%) since the 2018 census, and an increase of 150 people (5.6%) since the 2013 census. There were 1,383 males, 1,446 females, and 9 people of other genders in 1,179 dwellings. 3.1% of people identified as LGBTIQ+. The median age was 41.8 years (compared with 38.1 years nationally). There were 471 people (16.6%) aged under 15 years, 564 (19.9%) aged 15 to 29, 1,212 (42.8%) aged 30 to 64, and 594 (21.0%) aged 65 or older.

People could identify as more than one ethnicity. The results were 87.0% European (Pākehā); 12.4% Māori; 5.5% Pasifika; 5.6% Asian; 1.2% Middle Eastern, Latin American and African New Zealanders (MELAA); and 2.5% other, which includes people giving their ethnicity as "New Zealander". English was spoken by 96.9%, Māori by 1.9%, Samoan by 1.7%, and other languages by 8.6%. No language could be spoken by 2.0% (e.g. too young to talk). New Zealand Sign Language was known by 0.5%. The percentage of people born overseas was 16.3, compared with 28.8% nationally.

Religious affiliations were 35.2% Christian, 1.1% Hindu, 0.5% Islam, 0.1% Māori religious beliefs, 0.5% Buddhist, 0.3% New Age, and 1.1% other religions. People who answered that they had no religion were 53.4%, and 7.8% of people did not answer the census question.

Of those at least 15 years old, 360 (15.2%) people had a bachelor's or higher degree, 1,398 (59.1%) had a post-high school certificate or diploma, and 609 (25.8%) people exclusively held high school qualifications. The median income was $38,500, compared with $41,500 nationally. 192 people (8.1%) earned over $100,000 compared to 12.1% nationally. The employment status of those at least 15 was 1,191 (50.4%) full-time, 354 (15.0%) part-time, and 54 (2.3%) unemployed.

== Education ==
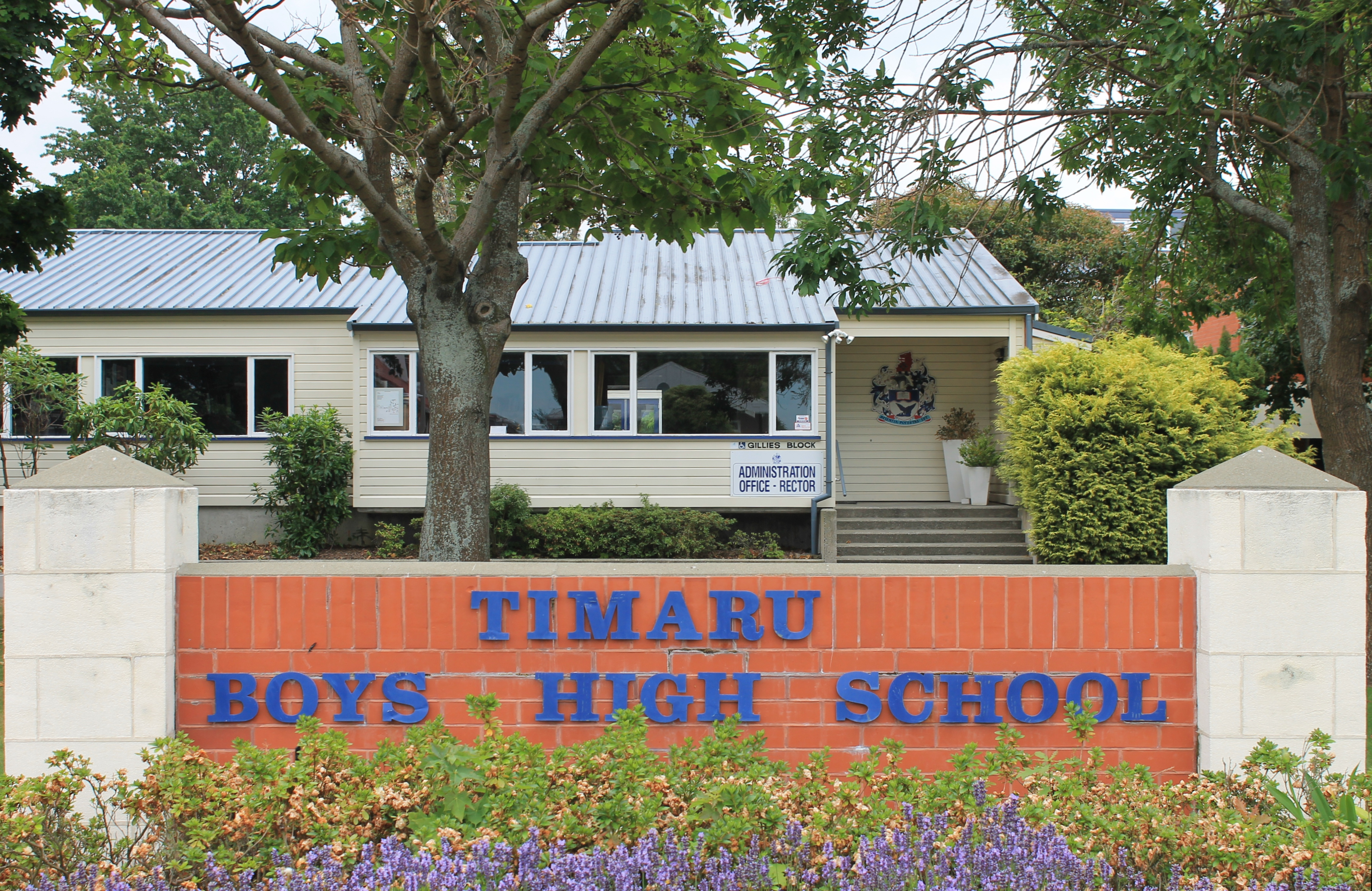
Timaru Boys' High School

Timaru Boys' High School is a single-sex secondary school for years 9 to 13 with a roll of 808 as of July 2026. It opened in 1880. Timaru Girls' High School started on the same site, separated by a fence.

Bluestone School is a coeducational primary serving years 1 to 8 with a roll of 471 as of July 2026. The school was established in 2005 on the Timaru West school site when it merged with Timaru Main (established 1873). Timaru West opened in 1913 as a side school for Timaru Main and became a separate school in 1923.
