= Kensington, Timaru =

Kensington
- Suburb
- Interactive map of Kensington
- Coordinates: 44.413°S 171.248°E
- Country: New Zealand
- City: Timaru
- Local authority: Timaru District Council
- Electoral ward: Timaru

Area
  - Land: 73 ha (180 acres)

Population (June 2025)
  - Total: 1,600
  - Density: 2,200/km^{2} (5,700/sq mi)

Watlington	Parkside
	Kensington
	Redruth

Kensington is a suburb of Timaru, in the South Canterbury area and Canterbury region of New Zealand's South Island. It is located south of the town centre.

== Demographics ==
Kensington covers 0.73 km^{2} (0.28 sq mi) and had an estimated population of 1,600 as of June 2025, with a population density of 2,192 people per km^{2}.

Historical population
Year	Pop.	±% p.a.
2006	1,443	—
2013	1,416	−0.27%
2018	1,464	+0.67%
2023	1,506	+0.57%

Kensington had a population of 1,506 in the 2023 New Zealand census, an increase of 42 people (2.9%) since the 2018 census, and an increase of 90 people (6.4%) since the 2013 census. There were 729 males, 771 females, and 6 people of other genders in 660 dwellings. 3.4% of people identified as LGBTIQ+. The median age was 38.2 years (compared with 38.1 years nationally). There were 264 people (17.5%) aged under 15 years, 303 (20.1%) aged 15 to 29, 693 (46.0%) aged 30 to 64, and 249 (16.5%) aged 65 or older.

People could identify as more than one ethnicity. The results were 85.5% European (Pākehā); 13.7% Māori; 4.4% Pasifika; 5.6% Asian; 0.8% Middle Eastern, Latin American and African New Zealanders (MELAA); and 2.4% other, which includes people giving their ethnicity as "New Zealander". English was spoken by 97.2%, Māori by 1.8%, Samoan by 1.4%, and other languages by 6.8%. No language could be spoken by 2.2% (e.g. too young to talk). New Zealand Sign Language was known by 0.4%. The percentage of people born overseas was 13.9, compared with 28.8% nationally.

Religious affiliations were 31.7% Christian, 1.0% Hindu, 0.4% Māori religious beliefs, 0.6% Buddhist, 0.6% New Age, and 1.4% other religions. People who answered that they had no religion were 56.6%, and 8.0% of people did not answer the census question.

Of those at least 15 years old, 141 (11.4%) people had a bachelor's or higher degree, 702 (56.5%) had a post-high school certificate or diploma, and 402 (32.4%) people exclusively held high school qualifications. The median income was $36,500, compared with $41,500 nationally. 57 people (4.6%) earned over $100,000 compared to 12.1% nationally. The employment status of those at least 15 was 594 (47.8%) full-time, 189 (15.2%) part-time, and 30 (2.4%) unemployed.
