= Seaview, New Zealand =

There are four geographic features called Seaview in New Zealand:

- Seaview, Hokitika, a suburb of Hokitika
- Seaview, Canterbury, a suburb of Timaru
- Seaview, Lower Hutt, a suburb of Lower Hutt
- Seaview (hill), a hill in Masterton District
