= Highfield, New Zealand =

Highfield
- Suburb
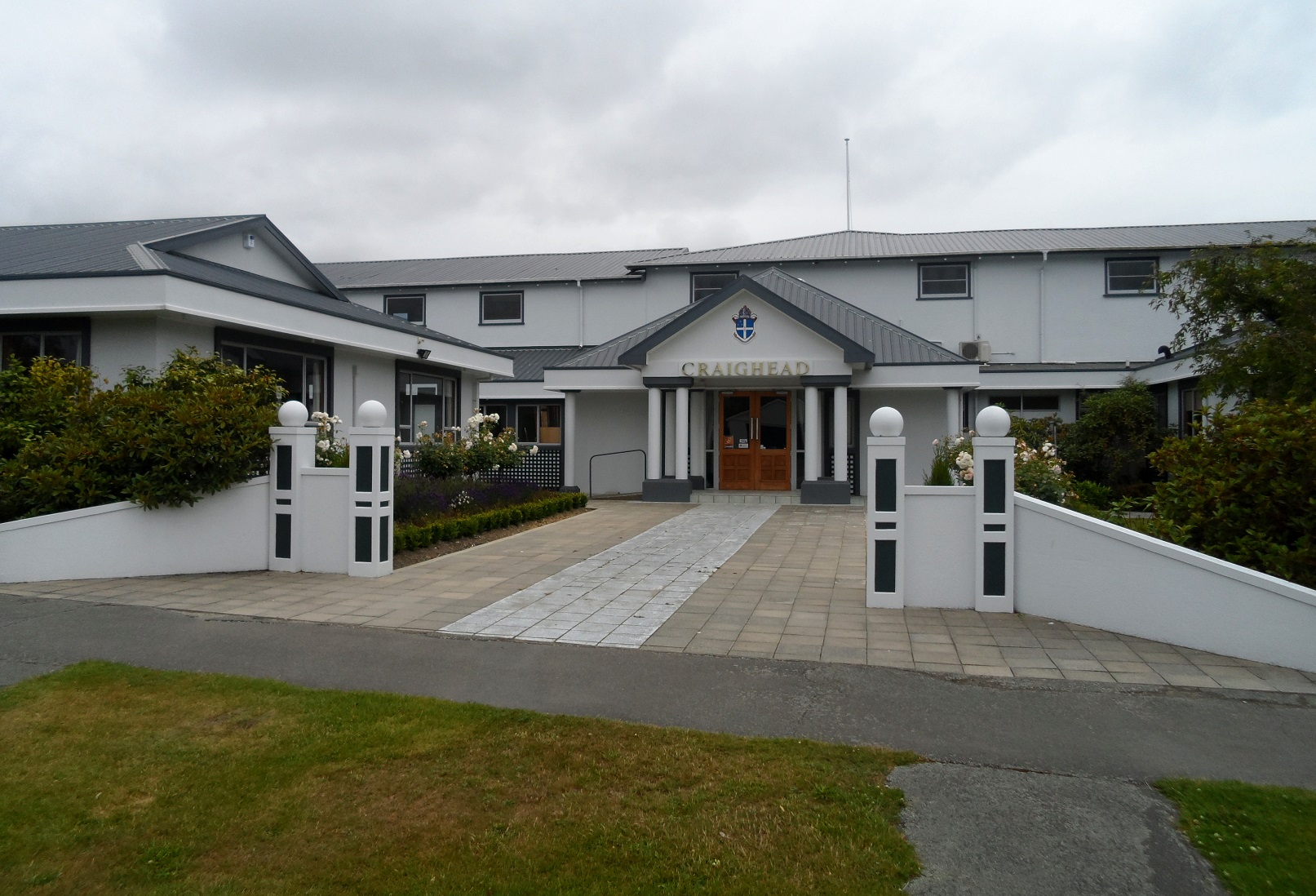
- Craighead Diocesan School
- Interactive map of Highfield
- Coordinates: 44.389716°S 171.218902°E
- Country: New Zealand
- City: Timaru
- Local authority: Timaru District Council
- Electoral ward: Timaru

Area
  - Land: 236 ha (580 acres)

Population (June 2025)
  - Total: 3,690
  - Density: 1,560/km^{2} (4,050/sq mi)

	Marchwiel	Waimataitai
Glenwood	Highfield	Maori Hill
		West End

Highfield is a suburb of Timaru, in the South Canterbury district and Canterbury region of New Zealand's South Island.

== Economy ==
=== Retail ===
The Highfield Village Mall includes a New World supermarket.

== Demographics ==
Highfield covers 2.36 km^{2} (0.91 sq mi). It had an estimated population of 3,690 as of June 2025, with a population density of 1,564 people per km^{2}.

Historical population
Year	Pop.	±% p.a.
2006	3,528	—
2013	3,420	−0.44%
2018	3,609	+1.08%
2023	3,639	+0.17%

Highfield had a population of 3,639 in the 2023 New Zealand census, an increase of 30 people (0.8%) since the 2018 census, and an increase of 219 people (6.4%) since the 2013 census. There were 1,713 males, 1,917 females, and 12 people of other genders in 1,515 dwellings. 2.2% of people identified as LGBTIQ+. The median age was 46.5 years (compared with 38.1 years nationally). There were 612 people (16.8%) aged under 15 years, 594 (16.3%) aged 15 to 29, 1,479 (40.6%) aged 30 to 64, and 960 (26.4%) aged 65 or older.

People could identify as more than one ethnicity. The results were 87.5% European (Pākehā); 8.3% Māori; 3.3% Pasifika; 5.8% Asian; 1.5% Middle Eastern, Latin American and African New Zealanders (MELAA); and 3.3% other, which includes people giving their ethnicity as "New Zealander". English was spoken by 97.0%, Māori by 1.2%, Samoan by 0.4%, and other languages by 9.3%. No language could be spoken by 1.6% (e.g. too young to talk). New Zealand Sign Language was known by 0.6%. The percentage of people born overseas was 17.2, compared with 28.8% nationally.

Religious affiliations were 41.0% Christian, 1.4% Hindu, 0.9% Islam, 0.2% Māori religious beliefs, 0.5% Buddhist, 0.3% New Age, and 1.4% other religions. People who answered that they had no religion were 48.6%, and 5.9% of people did not answer the census question.

Of those at least 15 years old, 594 (19.6%) people had a bachelor's or higher degree, 1,698 (56.1%) had a post-high school certificate or diploma, and 738 (24.4%) people exclusively held high school qualifications. The median income was $38,500, compared with $41,500 nationally. 324 people (10.7%) earned over $100,000 compared to 12.1% nationally. The employment status of those at least 15 was 1,416 (46.8%) full-time, 411 (13.6%) part-time, and 48 (1.6%) unemployed.

Individual statistical areas
Name	Area (km^{2})	Population	Density (per km^{2})	Dwellings	Median age	Median income
Highfield North	1.41	2,376	1,685	1,011	51.0 years	$37,400
Highfield South	0.95	1,263	1,329	507	39.5 years	$41,500
New Zealand					38.1 years	$41,500

== Education ==
Highfield School is a coeducational primary serving years 1 to 8 with a roll of 307. The school was established in 1962.

Craighead Diocesan School is a state-integrated girls' secondary school serving years 7 to 13 with a roll of 410. The school was established in 1911, and became an Anglican Church school in 1926.

Rolls are as of July 2026.
