= John Hardcastle =

New Zealand amateur scientist

John Hardcastle (21 January 1847 – 12 June 1927) was a New Zealand amateur scientist, and pioneer in the study of paleoclimatology.

Hardcastle was born in Wakefield, Yorkshire, England in 1847. He moved with his family to New Zealand in 1858. He spent most of his life in the South Island, largely at Timaru where he eventually became the editor of The Timaru Herald newspaper.

He was a committed and talented amateur scientist who published several papers, most significantly in the publications of the New Zealand Institute (the forerunner of the Royal Society of New Zealand). He studied the loess deposits near Timaru and on the basis of his observations was able to show how the loess deposit recorded past variations in climate. He showed how the origin of the loess was connected to glaciers in the Southern Alps and investigated how glaciers moved and how sediments were transported. His major scientific work was a short book on the geology of South Canterbury, which was republished in 2014. He died on 12 June 1927 and was buried at Timaru.

In 2018 Roger Fagg and Ian Smalley introduced a new term ‘Hardcastle Hollows’ for closed, isolated depressions in loess landscapes (such a forms were first noted by John Hardcastle in the 1880s, and discussed in his book from 1908).

== Citations ==
- Hardcastle, J. 1889. The origin of the loess deposits on the Timaru plateau. Transactions & Procccedings of the New Zealand Institute 22, 406–414 (on line: Royal Society of New Zealand http://rsnz.natlibgovt.nz; reproduced in Loess Letter supplement 23, November 1988).
- Hardcastle, J. 1890. On the Timaru loess as a climate register. Transactions & Proceedings of the New Zealand Institute 23, 324–332 (on line: Royal Society of New Zealand http://rsnz.natlib.govt.nz; reproduced in Loess Letter supplement 23, November 1988).
- Hardcastle, J. 1908. Notes on the Geology of South Canterbury. Timaru Herald, Timaru. 62pp. republished by Loess Letter, Leicester University 2014.
- Smalley, I.J., Fagg, R. 2014. John Hardcastle looks at the Timaru loess: Climatic signals are observed, and fragipans. Quaternary International https://dx.doi.org/10.1016/j.quaint.2014.06.042
