= Broomfield School =

Broomfield School may refer to:

- Broomfield School, London
- Broomfield School, New Zealand
- Broomfield School, North Yorkshire
