= New Zealand Farmers' Co-operative Association =

New Zealand's oldest stock and station business

The New Zealand Farmers' Co-operative Association, known also as The Farmers' Co-op or NZFCA, was New Zealand's oldest and longest established stock and station business, lasting 120 years. It is one of NZ's most longstanding rural trading organisations.

== History of the NZFCA ==
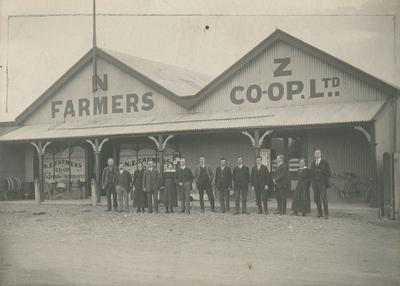
Staff in front of NZFCA Hawarden branch

The NZFCA was established in 1881, with Charles Ensor appointed President, F. Courage as Vice-president, and L.C. Williams as Hon. Secretary. The headquarters were based in Christchurch, and here the NZFCA established the benefits that their Association would have on farmers. Ultimately, the goal was to help farmers considerably save money and hold more autonomy on the sale of their produce.

It was the largest Co-operative Association in New Zealand by 1911.

== Background of Farmers' Co-operatives ==
Farmers' co-operatives were owned by farmers and directed by elected boards.

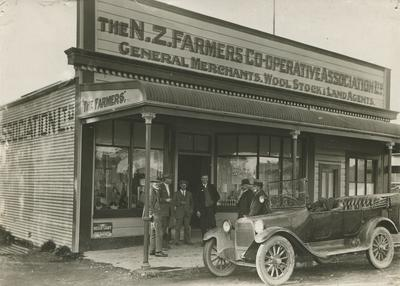
NFCZA Seddon branch

In 1924, nine major regional co-operatives covering the majority of New Zealand formed the Federation of Co-operatives. By 1980, this had been reduced to seven, including the New Zealand Farmers’ Co-operative Association. The seven names and locations were:

1. New Zealand Farmers’ Co-operative Association (Canterbury)
2. Allied Farmers’ Co-operative (Auckland and Waikato)
3. Farmers’ Co-operative Organisation Society (Taranaki)
4. Hawke’s Bay Farmers’ Co-operative Association
5. Canterbury Farmers’ Co-operative Association (South Canterbury)
6. Reid Farmers Ltd (Dunedin)
7. Southland Farmers’ Co-operative Association.
