= Giselle Byrnes =

New Zealand historian

- Byrnes in 2016
- Born: Giselle Margaret Byrnes; 17 July 1967 (age 59); Timaru, New Zealand

Academic background
- Education: University of Waikato (BA, MA); University of Auckland (PhD)
- Thesis: Inventing New Zealand: surveying, science, and the construction of cultural space, 1840s–1890s (1995)
- Doctoral advisor: Keith Sorrenson

Academic work
- Discipline: History
- Sub-discipline: New Zealand history
- Institutions: Victoria University of Wellington; University of Waikato; Charles Darwin University; Massey University

Giselle Margaret Byrnes (born 17 July 1967) is a New Zealand historian. She was previously the provost of Massey University, New Zealand. Previous employment included the Waitangi Tribunal and as lecturer at Victoria University of Wellington.

== Biography ==
Byrnes was born in Timaru on 17 July 1967, the daughter of Sandra Mary McConkey and James Lawrence Byrnes, and grew up in South Canterbury and the Bay of Plenty. She was educated Tauranga Girls' College, and went on to study at the University of Waikato, graduating with a Bachelor of Arts in history and English, and a Master of Arts in history. She completed a PhD in history at the University of Auckland in 1995. The title of her doctoral thesis was Inventing New Zealand: Surveying, science, and the construction of cultural space, 1840s–1890s.

From 1995 to 1997, Byrnes worked for the Waitangi Tribunal. From 1997 to 2007 she lectured in history at Victoria University of Wellington. She held the positions of professor of history and Pro Vice-Chancellor (Postgraduate) at the University of Waikato, and Pro Vice-Chancellor of the Faculty of Law, Education, Business and Arts at Charles Darwin University in Australia from 2011 to 2016.

In 2006, Byrnes was Fulbright Visiting professor in New Zealand Studies at Georgetown University, Washington DC. She has also served as national president of the New Zealand Historical Association.

In 2016 Byrnes was appointed assistant Vice-Chancellor (Research, Academic and Enterprise) at Massey University and concluded her employment in that role in October 2026.

== Selected publications ==
- The New Oxford History of New Zealand, general editor (Oxford University Press, 2009)
- The Waitangi Tribunal and New Zealand History (Oxford University Press, 2004)
- Boundary Markers: Land Surveying and the Colonisation of New Zealand (Bridget Williams Books, 2001)
