= Washdyke =

- Suburb
- Interactive map of Washdyke
- Coordinates: 44°21′S 171°14′E
- Country: New Zealand
- City: Timaru
- Local authority: Timaru District Council
- Electoral ward: Timaru

Area
  - Land: 1,066 ha (2,630 acres)

Population (June 2025)
  - Total: 1,150
  - Density: 108/km^{2} (279/sq mi)

Pleasant Point	Levels	Waipopo
Hadlow	Washdyke	(Canterbury Bight)
Marchwiel	Waimataitai	(Caroline Bay)

Washdyke is an industrial suburb in the north of Timaru, in south Canterbury, New Zealand. State Highway 1 passes through Washdyke on the way north out of the city. The northern terminus of State Highway 8 is in Washdyke.

Washdyke is home to Timaru's horse racetrack, "Phar Lap Raceway" - named after the champion racehorse, Phar Lap, who was foaled here in 1926.

The Main South Line railway passes through Washdyke, and it was formerly the location of a railway junction. On 18 February 1874, construction began on a branch line to Pleasant Point; this line ultimately became known as the Fairlie Branch when it was opened past Pleasant Point to Fairlie in 1884. Declining traffic led to the closure of the branch on 2 March 1968 and since then, the Main South Line has been the only railway through Washdyke. Passenger services through Washdyke ceased on 10 February 2002 with the cancellation of the Southerner express that operated between Christchurch and Invercargill.

Slightly south of the suburb is Washdyke Lagoon, a medium-sized tidal lagoon which a variety of wading birds frequent.

== Demographics ==
Washdyke covers 10.66 km^{2} (4.12 sq mi) and had an estimated population of 1,150 as of June 2025, with a population density of 108 people per km^{2}.

Historical population
Year	Pop.	±% p.a.
2006	1,044	—
2013	942	−1.46%
2018	1,017	+1.54%
2023	1,107	+1.71%

Washdyke had a population of 1,107 in the 2023 New Zealand census, an increase of 90 people (8.8%) since the 2018 census, and an increase of 165 people (17.5%) since the 2013 census. There were 561 males, 543 females, and 3 people of other genders in 459 dwellings. 2.2% of people identified as LGBTIQ+. The median age was 44.2 years (compared with 38.1 years nationally). There were 189 people (17.1%) aged under 15 years, 162 (14.6%) aged 15 to 29, 513 (46.3%) aged 30 to 64, and 240 (21.7%) aged 65 or older.

People could identify as more than one ethnicity. The results were 86.2% European (Pākehā); 11.9% Māori; 4.6% Pasifika; 5.7% Asian; 0.8% Middle Eastern, Latin American and African New Zealanders (MELAA); and 2.7% other, which includes people giving their ethnicity as "New Zealander". English was spoken by 97.3%, Māori by 2.7%, Samoan by 1.6%, and other languages by 7.6%. No language could be spoken by 1.9% (e.g. too young to talk). New Zealand Sign Language was known by 1.1%. The percentage of people born overseas was 14.1, compared with 28.8% nationally.

Religious affiliations were 38.2% Christian, 0.3% Hindu, 0.8% Islam, 0.5% Buddhist, 0.5% New Age, and 1.4% other religions. People who answered that they had no religion were 49.6%, and 8.4% of people did not answer the census question.

Of those at least 15 years old, 105 (11.4%) people had a bachelor's or higher degree, 528 (57.5%) had a post-high school certificate or diploma, and 279 (30.4%) people exclusively held high school qualifications. The median income was $43,200, compared with $41,500 nationally. 60 people (6.5%) earned over $100,000 compared to 12.1% nationally. The employment status of those at least 15 was 486 (52.9%) full-time, 114 (12.4%) part-time, and 18 (2.0%) unemployed.

== Education ==
Washdyke School was a primary school which opened in 1874 and was merged with Marchwiel School to form Oceanview Heights School on the Marchwiel site in 2004.

== See also ==
- Washdyke Lagoon
