= Fairview, New Zealand =

Fairview
- Rural Area
- Interactive map of Fairview
- Coordinates: 44.414°S 171.209°E
- Country: New Zealand
- Region: Canterbury
- Territorial authority: Timaru District
- Ward: Timaru Ward
- Electorates: Waitaki; Te Tai Tonga (Māori)

Government
  - Territorial authority: Timaru District Council
  - Regional council: Environment Canterbury
  - Mayor of Timaru: Nigel Bowen
  - Waitaki MP: Miles Anderson
  - Te Tai Tonga MP: Tākuta Ferris

Area
  - Total: 98.37 km^{2} (37.98 sq mi)

Population (June 2025)
  - Total: 1,710
  - Density: 17.4/km^{2} (45.0/sq mi)

Fairview is a rural community in the Timaru District, New Zealand. It is located southwest of Timaru.

== Demographics ==
Fairview locality covers 11.52 km^{2} (4.45 sq mi). It is part of the Fairview statistical area.

Historical population for Fairview locality
Year	Pop.	±% p.a.
2006	312	—
2013	291	−0.99%
2018	318	+1.79%
2023	303	−0.96%

Fairview locality had a population of 303 in the 2023 New Zealand census, a decrease of 15 people (−4.7%) since the 2018 census, and an increase of 12 people (4.1%) since the 2013 census. There were 153 males and 153 females in 111 dwellings. 1.0% of people identified as LGBTIQ+. There were 60 people (19.8%) aged under 15 years, 30 (9.9%) aged 15 to 29, 132 (43.6%) aged 30 to 64, and 78 (25.7%) aged 65 or older.

People could identify as more than one ethnicity. The results were 92.1% European (Pākehā); 4.0% Māori; 5.9% Asian; 1.0% Middle Eastern, Latin American and African New Zealanders (MELAA); and 2.0% other, which includes people giving their ethnicity as "New Zealander". English was spoken by 99.0%, and other languages by 4.0%. No language could be spoken by 1.0% (e.g. too young to talk). New Zealand Sign Language was known by 1.0%. The percentage of people born overseas was 12.9, compared with 28.8% nationally.

Religious affiliations were 45.5% Christian, 2.0% New Age, and 1.0% other religions. People who answered that they had no religion were 46.5%, and 5.0% of people did not answer the census question.

Of those at least 15 years old, 39 (16.0%) people had a bachelor's or higher degree, 150 (61.7%) had a post-high school certificate or diploma, and 54 (22.2%) people exclusively held high school qualifications. 36 people (14.8%) earned over $100,000 compared to 12.1% nationally. The employment status of those at least 15 was 111 (45.7%) full-time and 54 (22.2%) part-time.

=== Fairview statistical area ===
Fairview statistical area also includes Pareora and covers 98.37 km^{2} (37.98 sq mi). It had an estimated population of 1,710 as of June 2025, with a population density of 17 people per km^{2}.

Historical population for the statistical area
Year	Pop.	±% p.a.
2006	1,587	—
2013	1,581	−0.05%
2018	1,641	+0.75%
2023	1,620	−0.26%

Fairview statistical area had a population of 1,620 in the 2023 New Zealand census, a decrease of 21 people (−1.3%) since the 2018 census, and an increase of 39 people (2.5%) since the 2013 census. There were 822 males, 795 females, and 3 people of other genders in 624 dwellings. 2.4% of people identified as LGBTIQ+. The median age was 48.9 years (compared with 38.1 years nationally). There were 267 people (16.5%) aged under 15 years, 210 (13.0%) aged 15 to 29, 816 (50.4%) aged 30 to 64, and 327 (20.2%) aged 65 or older.

People could identify as more than one ethnicity. The results were 90.9% European (Pākehā); 8.9% Māori; 2.0% Pasifika; 4.1% Asian; 0.2% Middle Eastern, Latin American and African New Zealanders (MELAA); and 4.4% other, which includes people giving their ethnicity as "New Zealander". English was spoken by 98.7%, Māori by 0.7%, Samoan by 0.9%, and other languages by 4.6%. No language could be spoken by 1.1% (e.g. too young to talk). New Zealand Sign Language was known by 0.9%. The percentage of people born overseas was 12.6, compared with 28.8% nationally.

Religious affiliations were 32.0% Christian, 0.2% Hindu, 0.2% Māori religious beliefs, 0.7% New Age, and 0.7% other religions. People who answered that they had no religion were 57.6%, and 8.3% of people did not answer the census question.

Of those at least 15 years old, 186 (13.7%) people had a bachelor's or higher degree, 840 (62.1%) had a post-high school certificate or diploma, and 342 (25.3%) people exclusively held high school qualifications. The median income was $39,300, compared with $41,500 nationally. 117 people (8.6%) earned over $100,000 compared to 12.1% nationally. The employment status of those at least 15 was 687 (50.8%) full-time, 234 (17.3%) part-time, and 15 (1.1%) unemployed.

== Education ==
Barton Rural School is a full primary catering for years 1 to 8. It has a roll of 185 students. The school was created by the 2005 amalgamation of Fairview (established 1882) and Claremont (1878) schools.

Beaconsfield School is a full primary catering for years 1 to 8. It has a roll of 120 students. It was created by the 1997 amalgamation of Southburn (established 1892) and Pareora West (1874 - and also once called Beaconsfield School) schools, and Salisbury School (1899) was merged with it in 2005.

Both schools are coeducational. Rolls are as of July 2026.
