= Parkside, New Zealand =

Parkside
- Suburb
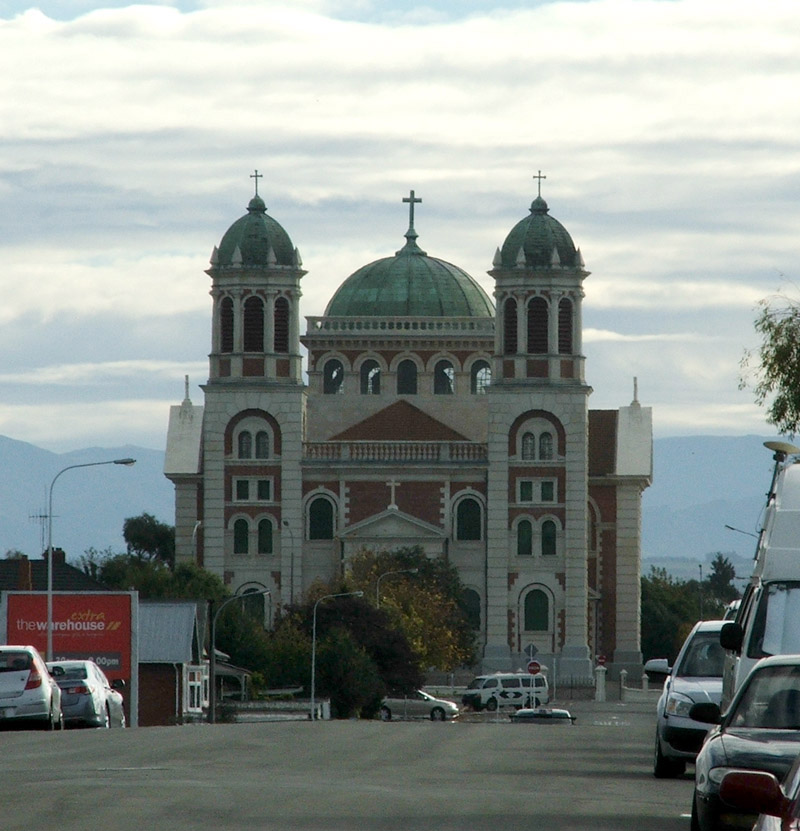
- Sacred Heart Church (Timaru Basilica)
- Interactive map of Parkside
- Coordinates: 44.404003°S 171.251246°E
- Country: New Zealand
- City: Timaru
- Local authority: Timaru District Council
- Electoral ward: Timaru

Area
  - Land: 115 ha (280 acres)

Population (June 2025)
  - Total: 2,550
  - Density: 2,220/km^{2} (5,740/sq mi)
- Hospitals: Timaru Hospital

East End	Seaview	Timaru Central
Watlington	Parkside
	Kensington

Parkside is a suburb of Timaru, in the Timaru District and Canterbury Region of New Zealand's South Island.

The suburb includes the Timaru Botanic Gardens, a garden reserve officially set aside in 1867. The garden started being planted in 1868 and was put under the care of a ranger in 1872.

Timaru Hospital is located on the north-eastern corner of the Botanic Gardens. It is a public hospital operated by South Canterbury District Health Board, which provides medical, mental health, children's health, maternity and surgical services.

The suburb has one designated park, Anzac Square. It also has three smaller pockets of reserve land: Alexandra Square, Russell Square and Boer War Memorial Park.

== Demographics ==
Parkside covers 1.15 km^{2} (0.44 sq mi) and had an estimated population of 2,550 as of June 2025, with a population density of 2,217 people per km^{2}.

Historical population
Year	Pop.	±% p.a.
2006	2,295	—
2013	2,358	+0.39%
2018	2,376	+0.15%
2023	2,433	+0.48%

Parkside had a population of 2,433 in the 2023 New Zealand census, an increase of 57 people (2.4%) since the 2018 census, and an increase of 75 people (3.2%) since the 2013 census. There were 1,173 males, 1,242 females, and 18 people of other genders in 1,068 dwellings. 3.9% of people identified as LGBTIQ+. The median age was 39.3 years (compared with 38.1 years nationally). There were 438 people (18.0%) aged under 15 years, 456 (18.7%) aged 15 to 29, 1,074 (44.1%) aged 30 to 64, and 468 (19.2%) aged 65 or older.

People could identify as more than one ethnicity. The results were 86.7% European (Pākehā); 12.5% Māori; 5.7% Pasifika; 6.2% Asian; 0.2% Middle Eastern, Latin American and African New Zealanders (MELAA); and 2.3% other, which includes people giving their ethnicity as "New Zealander". English was spoken by 97.3%, Māori by 2.3%, Samoan by 1.8%, and other languages by 7.5%. No language could be spoken by 1.7% (e.g. too young to talk). New Zealand Sign Language was known by 0.9%. The percentage of people born overseas was 16.0, compared with 28.8% nationally.

Religious affiliations were 34.8% Christian, 1.0% Hindu, 0.5% Islam, 0.4% Māori religious beliefs, 0.6% Buddhist, 0.9% New Age, and 1.0% other religions. People who answered that they had no religion were 52.2%, and 8.8% of people did not answer the census question.

Of those at least 15 years old, 234 (11.7%) people had a bachelor's or higher degree, 1,158 (58.0%) had a post-high school certificate or diploma, and 609 (30.5%) people exclusively held high school qualifications. The median income was $36,300, compared with $41,500 nationally. 105 people (5.3%) earned over $100,000 compared to 12.1% nationally. The employment status of those at least 15 was 975 (48.9%) full-time, 267 (13.4%) part-time, and 54 (2.7%) unemployed.

== Education ==
Timaru South School is a co-educational state primary for years 1 to 8 with a roll of 200. The school opened in 1881 as an extension of Timaru Main School. It merged with Pareora East School in 2004 and kept both campuses until 2018.

Timaru Girls' High School is a single-sex state secondary school for years 9 to 13 with a roll of 489. It opened in 1880, initially sharing a site with Timaru Boys' High School but separated by a fence.

Roncalli College is a Catholic coeducational state-integrated school for years 9 to 13 with a roll of 517. It was created by the 1982 merger of Mercy College (established 1935 as Sacred Heart College) and St Patrick's High School (established 1938).

Rolls are as of July 2026.
