= Timaru =

Timaru Te Tihi-o-Maru (Māori)
- City
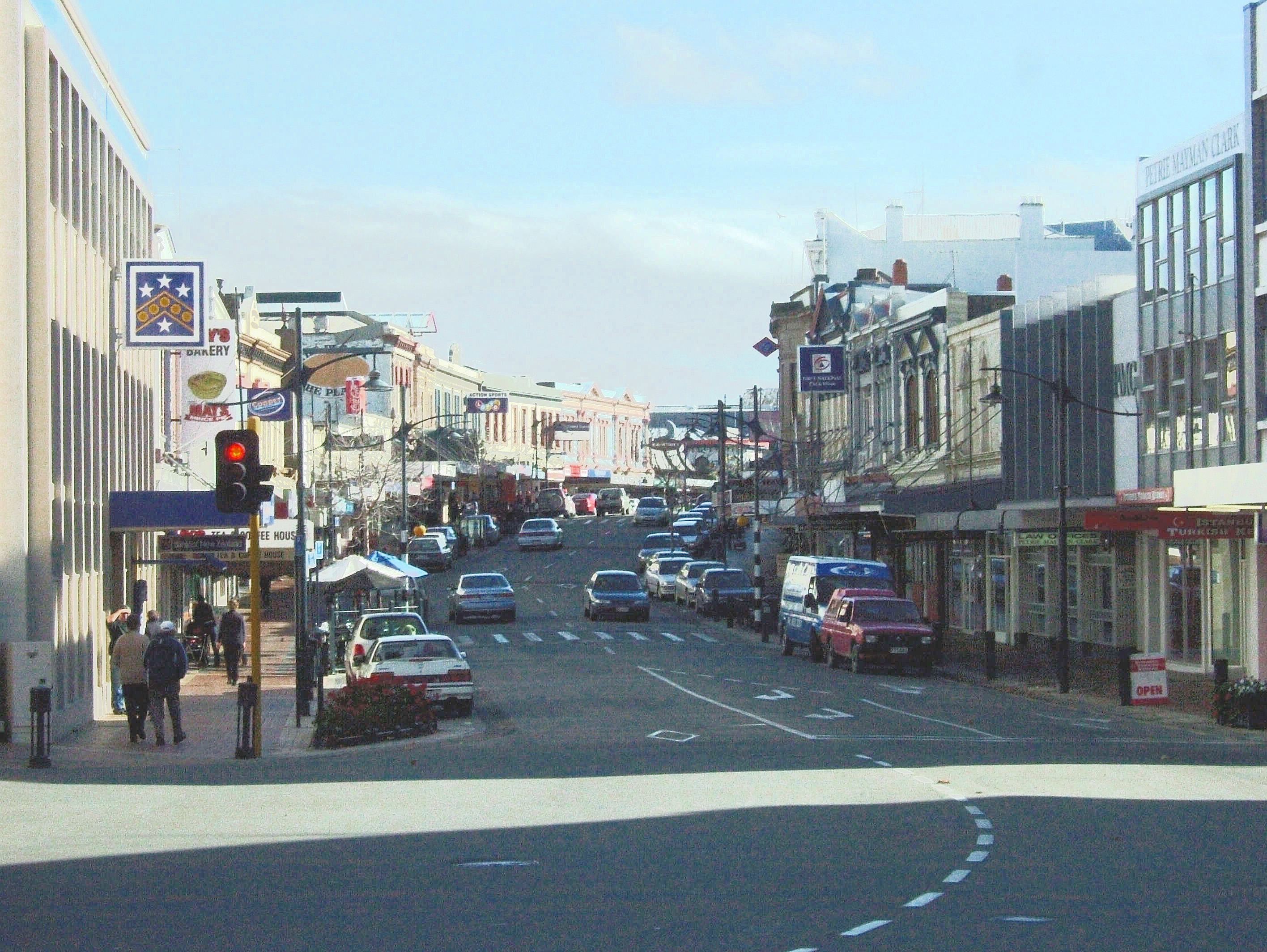
- View along Stafford Street in 2006

- Location within New Zealand
- Coordinates: 44°23′35″S 171°15′03″E
- Country: New Zealand
- Region: Canterbury
- Territorial authority: Timaru District
- Established: 13 July 1868

Government
  - Mayor: Nigel Bowen

Area
  - Land: 2,736.54 km^{2} (1,056.58 sq mi)
  - Urban: 33.98 km^{2} (13.12 sq mi)
- Highest elevation: 95 m (312 ft)
- Lowest elevation: 0 m (0 ft)

Population (June 2025)
  - Urban: 29,300
  - Urban density: 862/km^{2} (2,230/sq mi)
- Time zone: UTC+12 (New Zealand Standard Time)
  - Summer (DST): UTC+13 (New Zealand Daylight Time)
- Postcode: 7910
- Local iwi: Ngāi Tahu
- Website: timaru.govt.nz

Timaru (English: /ˈtɪməruː/; Māori: Te Tihi-o-Maru) is a port city in the southern Canterbury region of New Zealand, 157 km (98 mi) southwest of Christchurch and about 196 km (122 mi) northeast of Dunedin, on the eastern Pacific coast of the South Island. The urban area's population of 29,300 people is the largest in South Canterbury, and the third-largest in the Canterbury Region overall, after Christchurch and Rolleston. The town is the seat of the Timaru District, which includes the surrounding rural area and the towns of Geraldine, Pleasant Point and Temuka, which combined have a total population of 49,500.

Caroline Bay beach is a popular recreational area close to Timaru's main centre, just to the north of the substantial port facilities. Beyond Caroline Bay, the industrial suburb of Washdyke is at a major junction with State Highway 8, the main route into the Mackenzie Country. This provides a road link to Pleasant Point, Fairlie, Twizel, Lake Tekapo, Aoraki / Mount Cook and Queenstown.

Timaru is built on rolling hills created from lava flows of the extinct Mt Horrible volcano, which last erupted 2 to 2.5 Ma. The result is that most of the main streets are undulating, a clear contrast with the flat landscape of the Canterbury Plains to the north. The volcanic rock is referred to as bluestone, and is used in the construction of local buildings.

== History ==
=== Māori settlement ===
The origin of the name 'Timaru' is disputed. Some believe that it derives from Māori Te Maru, which can mean a 'place of shelter'. However, other authorities allege that Timaru originates from a literal translation of the combination of tī, a cabbage tree and maru, meaning 'shady'.

Māori waka seem to have employed the site of Timaru as a place to rest on journeys up and down the eastern coastline for many years before the arrival of the first Europeans in the 19th century. The area includes over 500 sites with traces of Māori rock art, particularly in the rock overhangs and caves of the Opuha and Ōpihi River valleys, to the west of modern-day Timaru. Archaeologists have suggested that Māori iwi (tribes) were permanently settled in the district before 1400 AD. During the 17th or 18th century the resident Ngāti Mamoe were driven southwards into Fiordland by an invasion of the Ngāi Tahu, who came from the North Island.

Te Runanga o Arowhenua is the hapū (subtribe) for Aoraki (Timaru District). Their marae is located just outside Temuka.

=== 19th century onwards ===
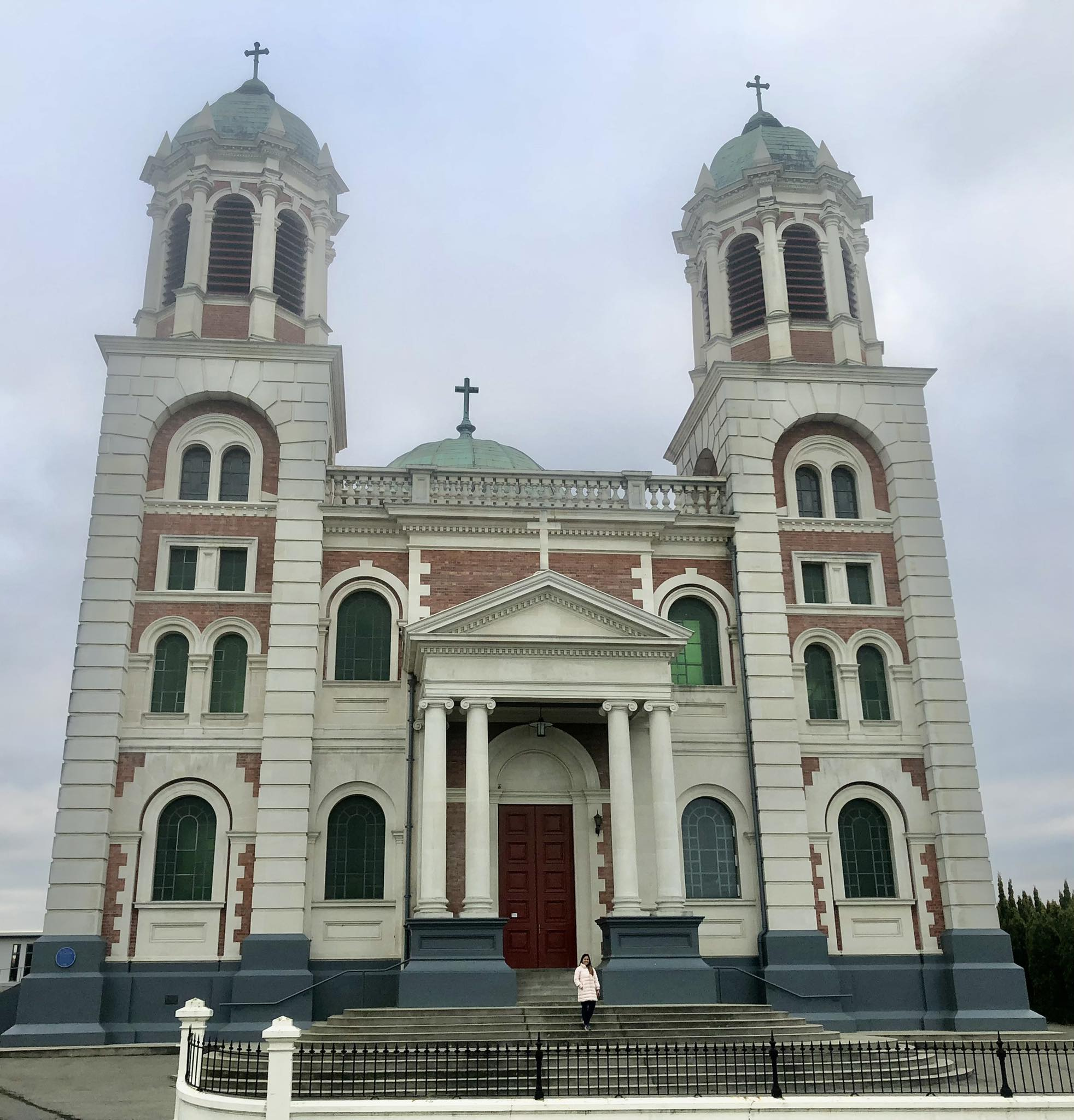
Sacred Heart Basilica, built in 1911

European settlement began with the construction of a whaling station in 1839 by the Weller brothers of Otago at Patiti Point, close to the present town centre. A supply ship, The Caroline, provided the name for a local bay. Later a sheep station, known as The Levels, was set up on land obtained by the Rhodes brothers, and run by George Rhodes. One of the earliest settlers was Captain Henry Cain, who set up a store in 1857 on behalf of Henry Le Cren of Lyttelton, and Le Cren himself moved to Timaru in the following year.

Few lived in Timaru until 14 January 1859 when the sailing ship Strathallan arrived from London, carrying a party of 111, 107, or, as a 1958 account said, about 120 immigrants. Persistent land disputes arose between the Rhodes brothers and local government officials with the result that two townships were established in the port area, Government Town and Rhodestown. These eventually merged into a single community in 1868. Given this division, until recently none of the main north-south streets lined up. Stafford Street, which became the main thoroughfare, was formed along the early bullock wagon trail.

Following the loss of a number of vessels off the coast, the breakwater design by Engineer John Goodall was adopted and work started on the redevelopment of the artificial port in 1877, which eventually caused sand washed south down the Pacific shoreline to build up against the northern mole. This was the beginning of the extensive land reclamation around the Caroline Bay district, an area which is still growing today.

Timaru continued to expand during the 20th century, with much of the development taking the form of wooden colonial style bungalows set in individual sections of land. Sacred Heart Basilica was opened in 1911.

== Geography ==
Timaru is situated along the Pacific Ocean coast. Much of the hinterland is farmland. To the north and northeast are the Canterbury Plains.

=== Suburbs ===
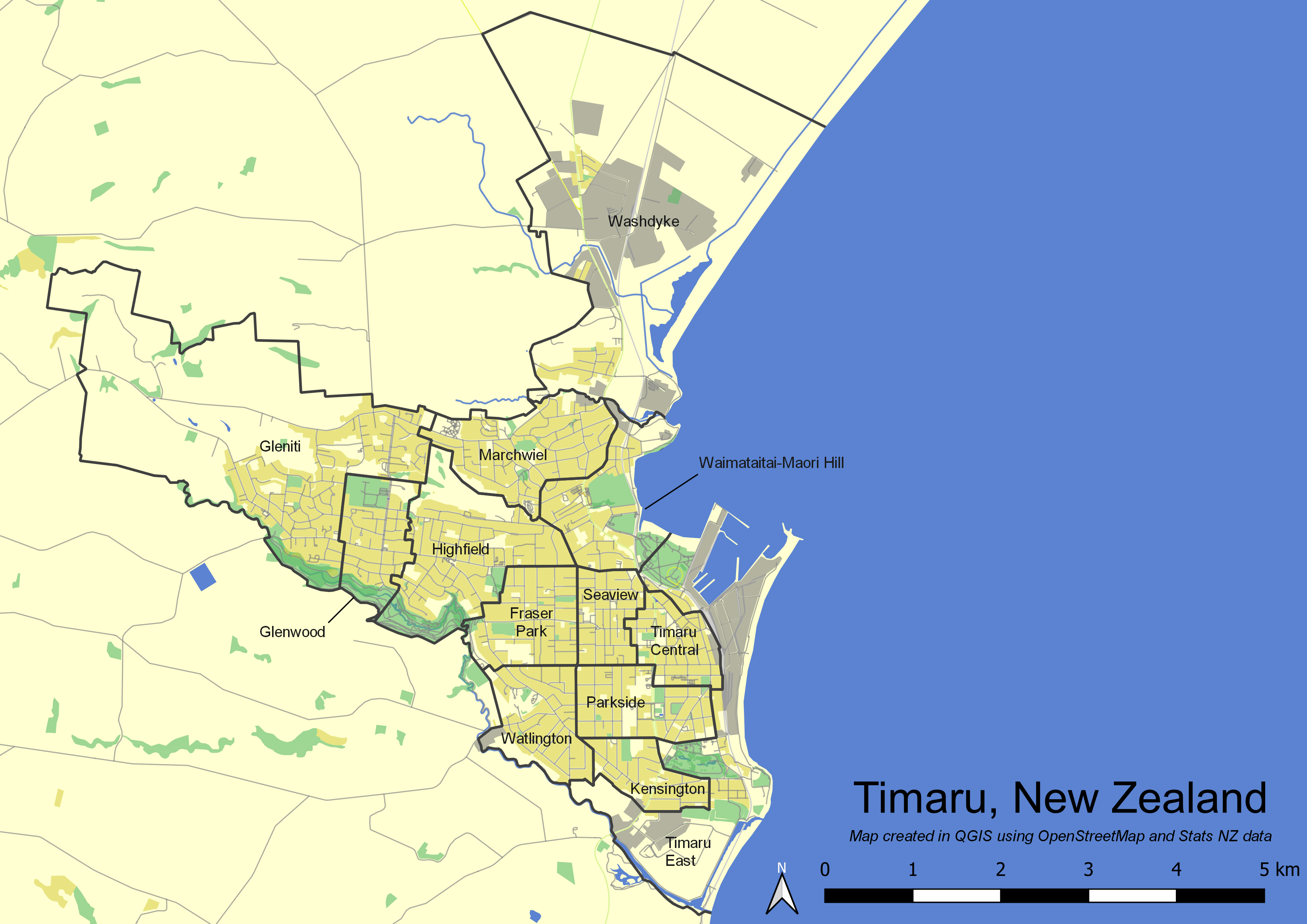
Suburbs of Timaru

- Washdyke
- Smithfield
- Grantlea
- Waimataitai
- Marchwiel
- Timaru Central
- Maori Hill
- Highfield
- Glenwood
- Gleniti
- Seaview
- West End
- Watlington
- Parkside
- Kensington
- Redruth
- Oceanview
- Port Timaru

=== Climate ===
Timaru has a relatively dry temperate climate similar to that of neighbouring Ashburton and Christchurch, classified as an oceanic climate (Cfb) by Köppen-Geiger climate classification system. Temperatures are warm in summer and cool in winter, with Timaru's extreme maximum temperature being 41.3 °C or 106.3 °F on 6 February 2011 and the extreme minimum −9.1 °C or 15.6 °F on 3 August 1998. Rain is evenly distributed throughout the year, with a very small proportion of it falling as snow.

Climate data for Timaru (1991–2020 normals, extremes 1885–present)
Month	Jan	Feb	Mar	Apr	May	Jun	Jul	Aug	Sep	Oct	Nov	Dec	Year
Record high °C (°F)	40.0 (104.0)	41.3 (106.3)	33.6 (92.5)	30.8 (87.4)	27.3 (81.1)	23.0 (73.4)	22.7 (72.9)	25.1 (77.2)	28.2 (82.8)	32.8 (91.0)	32.8 (91.0)	34.3 (93.7)	41.3 (106.3)
Mean daily maximum °C (°F)	20.1 (68.2)	19.6 (67.3)	18.2 (64.8)	15.6 (60.1)	13.2 (55.8)	10.6 (51.1)	10.1 (50.2)	11.1 (52.0)	13.6 (56.5)	15.4 (59.7)	16.8 (62.2)	18.5 (65.3)	15.2 (59.4)
Daily mean °C (°F)	15.8 (60.4)	15.5 (59.9)	13.8 (56.8)	11.1 (52.0)	8.7 (47.7)	5.9 (42.6)	5.4 (41.7)	6.7 (44.1)	9.1 (48.4)	10.8 (51.4)	12.4 (54.3)	14.3 (57.7)	10.8 (51.4)
Mean daily minimum °C (°F)	11.4 (52.5)	11.3 (52.3)	9.3 (48.7)	6.7 (44.1)	4.2 (39.6)	1.3 (34.3)	0.6 (33.1)	2.2 (36.0)	4.5 (40.1)	6.2 (43.2)	8.0 (46.4)	10.1 (50.2)	6.3 (43.3)
Record low °C (°F)	1.4 (34.5)	1.2 (34.2)	−0.9 (30.4)	−1.6 (29.1)	−5.6 (21.9)	−6.8 (19.8)	−6.7 (19.9)	−5.9 (21.4)	−4.6 (23.7)	−2.2 (28.0)	−1.1 (30.0)	−0.6 (30.9)	−6.8 (19.8)
Average rainfall mm (inches)	50.3 (1.98)	52.3 (2.06)	38.6 (1.52)	49.3 (1.94)	39.7 (1.56)	39.4 (1.55)	42.0 (1.65)	44.6 (1.76)	33.5 (1.32)	47.8 (1.88)	51.5 (2.03)	54.0 (2.13)	543 (21.38)
Average rainy days (≥ 1.0 mm)	7.6	6.0	5.8	7.3	6.4	5.3	5.0	5.6	5.4	8.1	7.2	7.0	76.7
Average relative humidity (%)	76.3	82.5	87.2	86.4	85.3	86.6	84.9	85.4	75.4	77.1	73.5	75.9	81.4
Mean monthly sunshine hours	183.5	167.0	170.2	154.9	127.9	120.0	131.9	157.4	153.0	183.3	191.8	176.6	1,917.5
Source: NIWA Climate Data

Climate data for Timaru Airport (1991–2020 normals, extremes 1962–present)
Month	Jan	Feb	Mar	Apr	May	Jun	Jul	Aug	Sep	Oct	Nov	Dec	Year
Record high °C (°F)	37.5 (99.5)	40.3 (104.5)	34.8 (94.6)	30.6 (87.1)	26.1 (79.0)	23.5 (74.3)	21.9 (71.4)	23.5 (74.3)	28.9 (84.0)	29.0 (84.2)	31.7 (89.1)	34.1 (93.4)	40.3 (104.5)
Mean maximum °C (°F)	32.1 (89.8)	31.1 (88.0)	29.0 (84.2)	24.6 (76.3)	21.4 (70.5)	18.2 (64.8)	18.0 (64.4)	20.1 (68.2)	22.9 (73.2)	25.3 (77.5)	27.7 (81.9)	29.7 (85.5)	33.7 (92.7)
Mean daily maximum °C (°F)	21.5 (70.7)	21.1 (70.0)	19.7 (67.5)	16.7 (62.1)	14.1 (57.4)	11.4 (52.5)	10.9 (51.6)	12.2 (54.0)	14.5 (58.1)	16.3 (61.3)	18.1 (64.6)	19.9 (67.8)	16.4 (61.5)
Daily mean °C (°F)	15.8 (60.4)	15.6 (60.1)	13.9 (57.0)	10.9 (51.6)	8.3 (46.9)	5.6 (42.1)	5.0 (41.0)	6.5 (43.7)	8.6 (47.5)	10.4 (50.7)	12.2 (54.0)	14.4 (57.9)	10.6 (51.1)
Mean daily minimum °C (°F)	10.2 (50.4)	10.1 (50.2)	8.1 (46.6)	5.1 (41.2)	2.5 (36.5)	−0.2 (31.6)	−0.9 (30.4)	0.7 (33.3)	2.6 (36.7)	4.4 (39.9)	6.3 (43.3)	8.9 (48.0)	4.8 (40.7)
Mean minimum °C (°F)	3.4 (38.1)	3.7 (38.7)	1.4 (34.5)	−0.8 (30.6)	−2.7 (27.1)	−4.9 (23.2)	−5.5 (22.1)	−4.5 (23.9)	−3.0 (26.6)	−1.7 (28.9)	0.0 (32.0)	2.7 (36.9)	−6.1 (21.0)
Record low °C (°F)	1.1 (34.0)	0.3 (32.5)	−3.3 (26.1)	−3.0 (26.6)	−7.8 (18.0)	−8.9 (16.0)	−8.8 (16.2)	−9.1 (15.6)	−5.3 (22.5)	−4.5 (23.9)	−2.2 (28.0)	−0.4 (31.3)	−9.1 (15.6)
Average rainfall mm (inches)	50.0 (1.97)	45.4 (1.79)	41.9 (1.65)	47.4 (1.87)	41.2 (1.62)	35.1 (1.38)	42.0 (1.65)	43.6 (1.72)	34.9 (1.37)	47.6 (1.87)	48.9 (1.93)	51.8 (2.04)	529.8 (20.86)
Source: NIWA

== Demographics ==
The Timaru urban area is described by Statistics New Zealand as a medium urban area. It covers 33.98 km^{2} (13.12 sq mi) and incorporates sixteen statistical areas. It had an estimated population of 29,300 as of June 2025, with a population density of 862 people per km^{2}.

Historical population for Timaru urban area
Year	Pop.	±% p.a.
2006	26,118	—
2013	26,262	+0.08%
2018	27,501	+0.93%
2023	28,095	+0.43%

The urban area had a population of 28,095 in the 2023 New Zealand census, an increase of 594 people (2.2%) since the 2018 census, and an increase of 1,833 people (7.0%) since the 2013 census. There were 13,710 males, 14,280 females, and 108 people of other genders in 11,790 dwellings. 2.7% of people identified as LGBTIQ+. The median age was 42.4 years (compared with 38.1 years nationally). There were 4,962 people (17.7%) aged under 15 years, 4,770 (17.0%) aged 15 to 29, 12,048 (42.9%) aged 30 to 64, and 6,315 (22.5%) aged 65 or older.

People could identify as more than one ethnicity. The results were 85.0% European (Pākehā); 10.8% Māori; 4.7% Pasifika; 7.2% Asian; 0.9% Middle Eastern, Latin American and African New Zealanders (MELAA); and 2.5% other, which includes people giving their ethnicity as "New Zealander". English was spoken by 97.0%, Māori by 1.9%, Samoan by 1.4%, and other languages by 9.0%. No language could be spoken by 1.8% (e.g. too young to talk). New Zealand Sign Language was known by 0.6%. The percentage of people born overseas was 17.4, compared with 28.8% nationally.

Religious affiliations were 37.7% Christian, 1.2% Hindu, 0.6% Islam, 0.3% Māori religious beliefs, 0.5% Buddhist, 0.5% New Age, and 1.2% other religions. People who answered that they had no religion were 50.3%, and 7.7% of people did not answer the census question.

Of those at least 15 years old, 3,423 (14.8%) people had a bachelor's or higher degree, 13,101 (56.6%) had a post-high school certificate or diploma, and 6,606 (28.6%) people exclusively held high school qualifications. The median income was $38,400, compared with $41,500 nationally. 1,806 people (7.8%) earned over $100,000 compared to 12.1% nationally. The employment status of those at least 15 was 11,232 (48.6%) full-time, 3,138 (13.6%) part-time, and 480 (2.1%) unemployed.

Individual statistical areas
Name	Area (km^{2})	Population	Density (per km^{2})	Dwellings	Median age	Median income
Gleniti North	5.42	1,596	294	648	52.2 years	$45,500
Washdyke	10.66	1,107	104	459	44.2 years	$43,200
Gleniti South	1.74	2,520	1,448	1,008	48.0 years	$40,200
Glenwood	1.09	1,884	1,728	735	39.4 years	$39,300
Marchwiel West	0.84	1,563	1,861	645	39.2 years	$36,200
Marchwiel East	0.93	2,007	2,158	753	37.9 years	$34,000
Highfield North	1.41	2,376	1,685	1,011	51.0 years	$37,400
Highfield South	0.95	1,263	1,329	507	39.5 years	$41,500
Waimataitai-Maori Hill	1.39	2,082	1,498	921	44.4 years	$37,500
Fraser Park	1.22	2,835	2,324	1,179	41.8 years	$38,500
Seaview	0.75	2,115	2,820	996	41.0 years	$36,000
Watlington	1.21	2,256	1,864	915	38.1 years	$41,500
Timaru Central	0.81	285	285	147	38.5 years	$47,400
Timaru East	3.70	270	270	135	44.6 years	$36,200
Parkside	1.15	2,433	2,116	1,068	39.3 years	$36,300
Kensington (Timaru District)	0.73	1,506	2,063	660	38.2 years	$36,500
New Zealand					38.1 years	$41,500

== Government ==
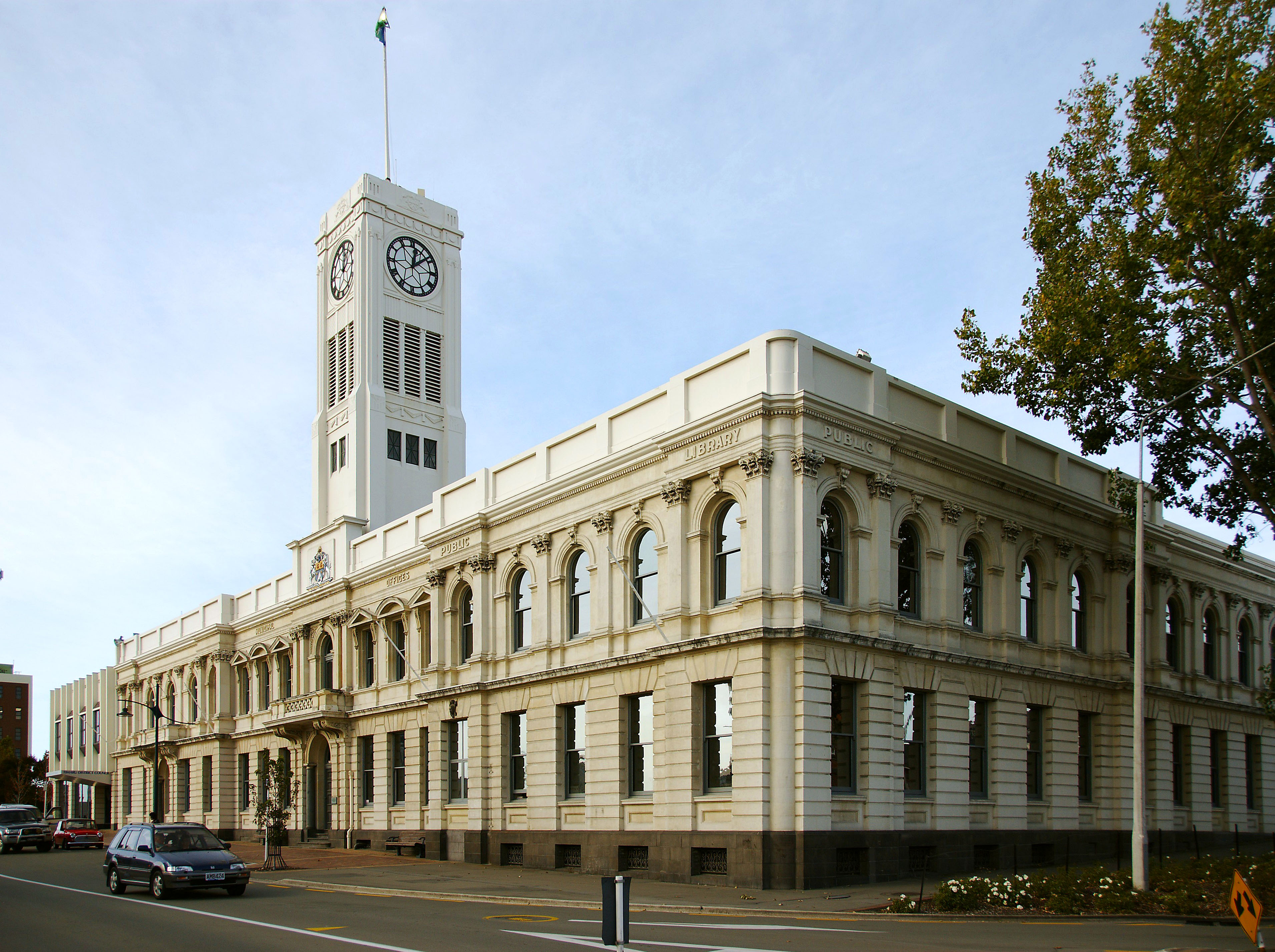
Timaru Council Building

The mayor of Timaru District is Nigel Bowen.

Timaru is part of the parliamentary electorate of Rangitata, represented by James Meager of the New Zealand National Party. Jo Luxton is a local list MP in the electorate from the New Zealand Labour Party.

=== Sister cities ===
Timaru District has established four sister city relationships.

- Orange, New South Wales, Australia
- Weihai, Shandong, China
- Eniwa, Hokkaidō, Japan
- Orange, California, United States of America

== Economy ==
Timaru is an agricultural service town and port for the South Canterbury regional economy. Timaru is one of the major cargo ports of the South Island, and also the second largest fishing port in New Zealand. The port receives frequent cruise ships throughout the summer months.

Timaru also has a number of light manufacturing plants associated with the export and import trade. Many of these producers are concerned with processing, packing, and distributing meat, dairy and other agricultural produce.

Allan Hubbard the chartered accountant and philanthropist established the failed finance company South Canterbury Finance and accounting firm Hubbard Churcher in Timaru and lived locally until his death in a car accident on 2 September 2011.

In late September 2024, the Alliance Group proposed closing down its Smithfield meatworks plant, which would affect about 600 jobs. Following consultation, the Alliance Group confirmed in mid-October 2024 that it would close down its Smithfield meat processing plant in December 2024, citing declining sheep processing numbers caused by land-use changes. The former Smithfield site has since been repurposed as a deer processing plant operated by Southern Alp Meats.

Timaru's average annual unemployment rate is significantly lower than the national average. In March 2026, Timaru's average unemployment was sitting at 4.0%, compared to New Zealand's overall average of 5.3%.

Venture Timaru is the official economic development agency for the whole of Timaru District.

== Shopping ==
Retailing is concentrated around the Stafford Street area. In addition there are a number of local shopping malls distributed around the city, with extensive car parking facilities.

== Tourist attractions ==
The South Canterbury Museum is the main museum for the region, containing exhibits relating to physical geography and the environment, fossil remains, Māori rock art, the early settlement of the district, local maritime history, scrimshaw, the E P Seally natural history collection, and information about Richard Pearse, a local inventor and his attempts at manned flight in the first years of the 20th century.

The Aigantighe Art Gallery (a Scots Gaelic word pronounced "egg and tie") in Wai-iti Road is the South Island's third largest art museum. It holds a collection of New Zealand, Pacific, Asian and European art works from the sixteenth century to the present day and includes a sculpture garden. The gallery was founded in 1956 and is housed in a homestead built in 1905.

Trevor Griffiths Rose Garden during the Caroline Bay Carnival.

Timaru has with a number of open spaces, public gardens and parks. The Trevor Griffiths Rose Garden at Caroline Bay Park is a major feature of the Timaru Piazza development. The parkland of the Bay Area contains a mini golf course, a roller skating rink, a soundshell and amphitheatre style seating for musical events. It is home to the annual Caroline Bay Summer Carnival that takes place over the Christmas and New Year holiday period, featuring live performances, games, and side shows, takes place from Boxing Day through to mid-January at Caroline Bay Park.

To the south of the city centre are the Timaru Botanic Gardens, first laid out in 1864, with a notable collection of roses and native tree ferns. To the west is the Centennial Park Reserve, opened in 1940, that includes a tranquil 3.5 km walkway following the wooded valley of the Otipua Creek.

Te Ana Māori Rock Art Centre provides guided tours of Māori rock art sites in the district.

== Recreation and leisure ==
=== Performing arts ===
The Theatre Royal at 118 Stafford Street was home of much of Timaru's live entertainment up to 2019, however it is currently closed for renovations. The South Canterbury Drama League hosts shows at the Playhouse. The Aidan Theatre is an independent performing arts group which hosts an annual Summer Shakespeare production in the Aigantighe Art Gallery Gardens.

=== Movies and film ===
Timaru has a movie theatre on Canon St, Timaru.

=== Public libraries ===
The Timaru District Library has branches situated in Timaru, Temuka and Geraldine.

The first Reading Room was opened in the School House, Barnard Street in 1862. English and Colonial Newspapers were provided and a selection of Library Books for the use by members. In 1870 the Mechanics Institute was created by an addition on an existing building and aimed to provide a Library, Reading Room and News Room.

Timaru Public Library was officially opened in 1909 on the present Timaru District Council site. It was a Carnegie library, built with a 3,000 pound grant from Andrew Carnegie of New York – the condition under which the money was given was that the reading rooms should be open to everyone and that the lending Library should be free to ratepayers of the borough. The current library was opened on Sophia Street by the roundabout in 1979. It was designed by Miles, Warren and Mahoney.

== Sports ==
=== Sporting venues ===
Timaru has a comprehensive range of community sporting facilities designed to international standards for rugby, tennis, yachting, Hardcourt Bike Polo, swimming, netball, motor racing, cricket, golf, hockey, croquet, pistol shooting, trap shooting, bowls and horse racing. Aorangi Park is Timaru's major sporting venue with an athletics centre, netball centre, hockey turfs and cricket centre. The Council also operates the CBay indoor and outdoor swimming pool complex which also features a cafe and gym. Timaru is also home to the Timaru International Motor Raceway, which is one of only 4 permanent sealed motor racing circuits in the South island. Horse racing is held at the Phar Lap Raceway.

=== Football ===
Timaru's main football ground is Sir Basil Arthur Park. It has four senior pitches and six junior pitches. Football is also played at The Caledonian Grounds, Anzac Square, West End Park, Aorangi Park and Marchwiel Park. Clubs include Timaru United, Northern Hearts, Timaru Thistle, Temuka United and Pleasant Point.

=== Golf ===
Timaru has many golf clubs and well-maintained golf courses, including:

- Highfield Golf Club
- Gleniti Golf Club
- Timaru Golf Club

and in close proximity to these:

- Pleasant Point Golf Club
- Maungati Golf Club (9 holes)
- Temuka Golf Club

=== Rugby ===
- South Canterbury Rugby Football Union is based in Timaru. Fraser Park is the home of local rugby.
- In the wake of the February 2011 Christchurch earthquake, the Super Rugby team, the Crusaders, moved two seasonal games to Timaru.

=== Surfing ===
- Patiti Point, near Timaru city, has a left-hand reef break, which operates very consistently in any swell from the east or south.
- Jack's Point (3 km south of Timaru) has both left and right-hand reef breaks at high tide, as does Lighthouse Reef, a short walk to the south.

=== Inline speed skating ===
Timaru has New Zealand's largest Inline speed skating teams, South Canterbury, which has national records in several disciplines. The club has held many national tournaments over the years and holds the annual tour of Timaru.

=== Tennis ===
Timaru has several tennis clubs affiliated to Tennis South Canterbury. Their headquarters is the Trust Aoraki Tennis Centre on Benvenue Avenue, Timaru which features 14 outdoor floodlit courts. Since 2025, the venue has hosted a weeklong international tennis competition as part of the ITF World Tennis Tour.

== Cultural festivals ==
Multicultural Aoraki hold an annual Multicultural Festival including food stalls and cultural performances.

The Timaru Malayalee Association Inc. (TMA) actively celebrates Kerala's heritage with community initiatives, traditional festivals, and sporting events like badminton tournaments, cricket matches, and language classes. The South Canterbury Indian Cultural Society hold an annual Diwali celebration.

Te Aitarakihi is an urban marae on Bridge Street which runs a lot of cultural activities including kapa haka and te reo Maori courses. It also holds public events to celebrate Waitangi Day and Matariki, and runs a community garden.

== Transport ==
Timaru is on State Highway 1 (SH1), the main road route down the eastern coast of the South Island.

There are regular coach and minibus services to Christchurch, Dunedin, Invercargill, Queenstown and the Mackenzie Country, leaving from outside the Visitor Information Centre, which provides booking facilities and other travel services.

The Main South Line section of the South Island Main Trunk Railway runs through Timaru and is a significant freight corridor. Passenger rail services were discontinued after the cancellation of the Southerner in February 2002. Between 1949 and 1970, Timaru was serviced by the South Island Limited, one of the former New Zealand Railways Department's most prestigious trains.

Richard Pearse Airport is to the north of the town. It is equipped to handle light aircraft and short haul domestic flights, with daily services to and from Wellington

The "Timaru Link" bus service runs weekdays and the on demand bus service known as "MyWay" run daily.

== Utilities ==
Timaru's water comes from the Pareora River and Ōpihi River, and is stored in the Claremont Reservoir. Timaru's water is treated with ozone and is chlorinated.

== Education ==
Further information: List of schools in Canterbury, New Zealand

=== Primary ===
- Barton Rural Primary School (previously Fairview)
- Beaconsfield Primary School (previously Pareora West)
- Bluestone Primary School (previously West School)
- Gleniti Primary School
- Grantlea Downs (previously Grantlea)
- Highfield Primary School
- Oceanview Heights Primary School (previously Marchwiel School)
- Sacred Heart Primary
- St. Josephs School
- Timaru Christian School
- Timaru South School
- Waimataitai Primary School

=== Secondary ===
- Aoraki Alternative Education Centre
- Craighead Diocesan School
- Mountainview High School
- Roncalli College
- Timaru Boys' High School
- Timaru Girls' High School

=== Tertiary ===
Ara Institute of Canterbury

== Media ==
=== Print ===
The Timaru Herald is the local daily newspaper for the district and has been published since the mid nineteenth century. Papers are printed in Ashburton and then distributed throughout the Otago and South Canterbury region. The Herald is owned by Stuff (formerly Fairfax New Zealand). The High Country Herald, also published by Stuff, has a circulation of 43,000 copies.

The region also supports a weekly community newspaper, The Timaru Courier, which has a circulation of over 24,000 copies and is delivered free every Thursday to local households. The Courier is owned by Allied Press of Dunedin.

=== Radio ===
The Breeze broadcasts live from Timaru on 89.9FM and 92.3FM each morning.

Timaru also has local FM radio station 100.3FM South Canterbury and a volunteer-run Hospital Radio 88.0/107.5 which celebrated its 30th anniversary in 2019.

== Healthcare ==
The Timaru Public Hospital, located at 14 Queen Street, has a 24-hour accident and emergency department. Timaru also has a privately owned surgical hospital known as the Bidwill Trust Hospital. Next door to Bidwill Hospital is Pacific Radiology, a private medical imaging company.

== Notable residents ==
=== Academics ===
- Hugh D. Wilson, botanist
- Giselle Byrnes, historian, b.1967

=== Business ===
- Henry Le Cren, Timaru pioneer and first European trader
- Fulbert Archer, of the merchant house Miles Archer and Co 1867–1893; first Chairman of the Timaru Harbour Board

=== Politics ===
- James Craigie, politician
- Basil Arthur, politician
- Jo Goodhew, politician
- Jim Sutton, politician

=== Film and television ===
- Phillip Leishman, broadcaster
- Kevin Smith, actor
- Josh Thomson
- Jane Wills, actor

=== Entertainment ===
- Aubrey Haive, drag queen
- Sam Wills, comedian

=== Journalism ===
- Allen Curnow, poet and journalist
- John Hardcastle, journalist and amateur scientist

=== Medicine ===
- Edith Tennent, nurse and Matron of Dunedin Hospital, born in Timaru

=== Music ===
- Peter Dawkins, Record producer and musician
- Michael Houstoun, concert pianist

=== Art ===
- Rosemary Campbell, painter
- Betty Curnow, painter and printmarker
- Roy Good, painter and designer

=== Drama ===
- Violet Targuse, playwright

=== Religious leaders ===
- Reginald Delargey, Roman Catholic cardinal

=== Aviation ===
- Richard Pearse, farmer, inventor and pioneering aviator

=== Sports ===
- Uini Atonio, professional rugby player, French international
- Hamish Bennett, cricketer, former Black Cap
- Craig Cumming, former Black Cap cricketer, sports broadcaster
- Bob Fitzsimmons, World Heavyweight Champion from 17 March 1897 until 9 June 1899
- Ross Gillespie New Zealand Olympic field hockey representative
- Tony Lamborn, Professional rugby player, USA international
- Brendan Laney, former professional rugby player, sports broadcaster
- Danyon Loader, men's swimming Olympic champion, born in Timaru
- Jack Lovelock, New Zealand runner, 1936 Olympic 1500m champion, world mile record holder
- Hayden Paddon, rally driver, 2011 Production World Rally Championship champion
- Mark Moreton Parker, NZ cricketer
- Murray Parker, NZ cricketer
- Aki Seiuli, NZ Rugby Player, Otago, Glasgow Warriors
- Haidee Tiffen, NZ women's cricketer
- John Ward, NZ cricketer
- Tomas Walsh, NZ shotputter
- Kalolo Tuiloma, professional rugby player, Samoan international

== See also ==
- Phar Lap
