= Waimataitai =

- Suburb
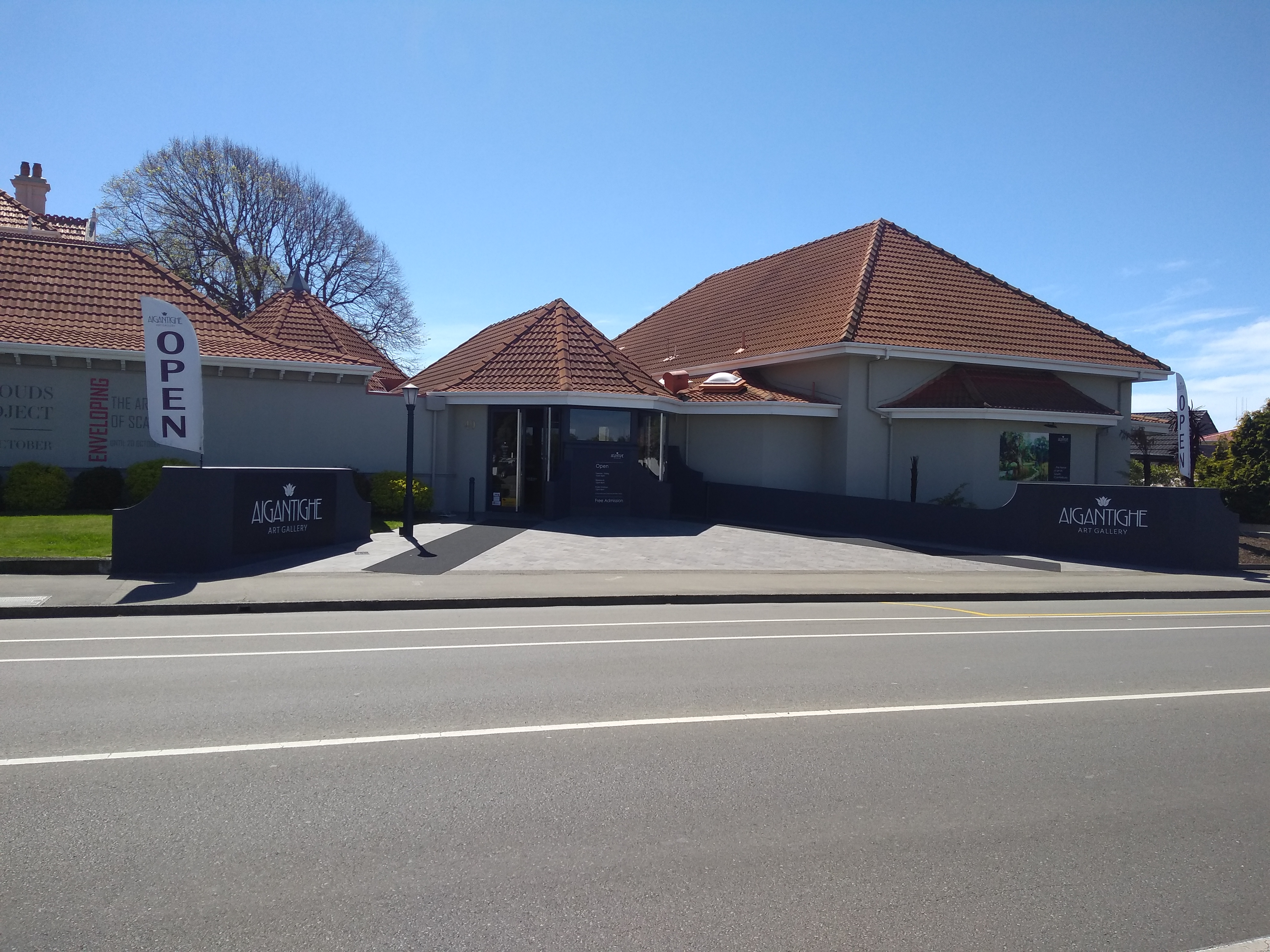
- Aigantighe Art Gallery
- Interactive map of Waimataitai
- Coordinates: 44.382°S 171.238°E
- Country: New Zealand
- City: Timaru
- Local authority: Timaru District Council
- Electoral ward: Timaru

Area
  - Land: 139 ha (340 acres)

Population (June 2025)
  - Total: 2,200
  - Density: 1,600/km^{2} (4,100/sq mi)

Marchwiel, New Zealand	Washdyke
Highfield	Waimataitai	(Caroline Bay)
West End	Seaview	Port Timaru

Waimataitai is a suburb of Timaru, in the South Canterbury district and Canterbury region of New Zealand's South Island.

== Demographics ==
The statistical area of Waimataitai-Maori Hill covers 1.39 km^{2} (0.54 sq mi) and had an estimated population of 2,200 as of June 2025, with a population density of 1,583 people per km^{2}.

Historical population
Year	Pop.	±% p.a.
2006	1,887	—
2013	1,902	+0.11%
2018	2,043	+1.44%
2023	2,082	+0.38%

Waimataitai-Maori Hill had a population of 2,082 in the 2023 New Zealand census, an increase of 39 people (1.9%) since the 2018 census, and an increase of 180 people (9.5%) since the 2013 census. There were 1,041 males, 1,029 females, and 12 people of other genders in 921 dwellings. 2.4% of people identified as LGBTIQ+. The median age was 44.4 years (compared with 38.1 years nationally). There were 306 people (14.7%) aged under 15 years, 372 (17.9%) aged 15 to 29, 888 (42.7%) aged 30 to 64, and 513 (24.6%) aged 65 or older.

People could identify as more than one ethnicity. The results were 82.3% European (Pākehā); 11.1% Māori; 4.3% Pasifika; 9.5% Asian; 1.2% Middle Eastern, Latin American and African New Zealanders (MELAA); and 1.7% other, which includes people giving their ethnicity as "New Zealander". English was spoken by 97.1%, Māori by 2.7%, Samoan by 1.7%, and other languages by 12.1%. No language could be spoken by 1.6% (e.g. too young to talk). New Zealand Sign Language was known by 0.1%. The percentage of people born overseas was 22.8, compared with 28.8% nationally.

Religious affiliations were 38.5% Christian, 2.3% Hindu, 0.7% Islam, 0.4% Māori religious beliefs, 0.6% Buddhist, 0.4% New Age, and 0.9% other religions. People who answered that they had no religion were 48.1%, and 8.1% of people did not answer the census question.

Of those at least 15 years old, 291 (16.4%) people had a bachelor's or higher degree, 930 (52.4%) had a post-high school certificate or diploma, and 552 (31.1%) people exclusively held high school qualifications. The median income was $37,500, compared with $41,500 nationally. 138 people (7.8%) earned over $100,000 compared to 12.1% nationally. The employment status of those at least 15 was 858 (48.3%) full-time, 270 (15.2%) part-time, and 33 (1.9%) unemployed.

== Economy ==
=== Retail ===
Northtown Mall opened at Waimataitai in the 1970s. It was upgraded in 2016, and includes a Pak'nSave supermarket.

A number of chain stores have their Timaru branches at Waimataitai, and there are a number of fast food outlets in the area.

== Education ==
Waimataitai School is a coeducational primary serving years 1 to 8 with a roll of 463 as of July 2026. The school was established in 1882.
