= Grantlea Downs School =

Location
- 65 Grants Road, Timaru, New Zealand; 44°22′28″S 171°14′9″E

Information
- Type: State, Co-educational, Primary
- Motto: The country school in town
- Established: 1959
- Ministry of Education Institution no.: 2111
- Principal: Steve Fennessy
- Enrolment: 302 (July 2026)
- Socio-economic decile: 4
- Website: grantleadowns.school.nz

Grantlea Downs School is a primary school in Timaru, New Zealand, that was established in 1959. In 2004 they merged with Seadown School. The Principal from 1997 to 2014 was Dave Hawkey. The current principal is Richard Kidd.

== Vaccination Refusal ==
In April 2017 the Board of Trustees refused to allow vaccinations against Human Papilloma Virus (HPV) to be administered on its grounds. If contracted, the virus could lead to increased risk of a number of cancers, including cervical cancer. "The school is willing to allow the students to attend vaccinations at another venue or, of course, families can attend Primary Care for immunisations," a spokesperson said.
