= Broomfield, New Zealand =

Broomfield
- Interactive map of Broomfield
- Coordinates: 43.118°S 172.686°E
- Country: New Zealand
- Region: Canterbury
- Territorial authority: Hurunui District
- Ward: South Ward
- Electorates: Kaikōura; Te Tai Tonga

Government
  - Territorial Authority: Hurunui District Council
  - Regional council: Environment Canterbury
  - Mayor of Hurunui: Marie Black
  - Kaikoura MP: Stuart Smith
  - Te Tai Tonga MP: Tākuta Ferris

Area
  - Total: 18.87 km^{2} (7.29 sq mi)

Population (2023 census)
  - Total: 306
  - Density: 16.2/km^{2} (42.0/sq mi)
- Postcode: 7482
- Local iwi: Ngāi Tahu

Broomfield is a rural community in the Hurunui District, in the northern part of Canterbury in New Zealand's South Island. It is approximately 10 minutes drive West of Amberley.

== Demographics ==
Broomfield locality covers 18.87 km^{2} (7.29 sq mi). It is part of the larger Balcairn statistical area.

Historical population
Year	Pop.	±% p.a.
2013	252	—
2018	282	+2.28%
2023	306	+1.65%

Broomfield locality had a population of 306 in the 2023 New Zealand census, an increase of 24 people (8.5%) since the 2018 census, and an increase of 54 people (21.4%) since the 2013 census. There were 153 males and 156 females in 108 dwellings. 2.0% of people identified as LGBTIQ+. There were 51 people (16.7%) aged under 15 years, 42 (13.7%) aged 15 to 29, 150 (49.0%) aged 30 to 64, and 69 (22.5%) aged 65 or older.

People could identify as more than one ethnicity. The results were 98.0% European (Pākehā), 9.8% Māori, 2.9% Pasifika, 1.0% Asian, and 2.0% other, which includes people giving their ethnicity as "New Zealander". English was spoken by 100.0%, Māori by 1.0%, and other languages by 3.9%. New Zealand Sign Language was known by 1.0%. The percentage of people born overseas was 13.7, compared with 28.8% nationally.

Religious affiliations were 31.4% Christian, 1.0% Hindu, 1.0% Māori religious beliefs, 1.0% New Age, and 3.9% other religions. People who answered that they had no religion were 52.0%, and 10.8% of people did not answer the census question.

Of those at least 15 years old, 54 (21.2%) people had a bachelor's or higher degree, 141 (55.3%) had a post-high school certificate or diploma, and 66 (25.9%) people exclusively held high school qualifications. 21 people (8.2%) earned over $100,000 compared to 12.1% nationally. The employment status of those at least 15 was 120 (47.1%) full-time and 66 (25.9%) part-time.

== Education ==
Broomfield School is a co-educational state primary school for Year 1 to 8 students, with a roll of 135 as of July 2026. It opened in 1881.
