= Mountainview High School, New Zealand =

Mountainview High School

Location
- Pages Road; Timaru 7910; New Zealand; 44.3767°S 171.2184°E

Information
- Type: State, Co-educational, Secondary, (High school)
- Motto: Empower to Thrive
- Established: 1901
- Ministry of Education Institution no.: 359
- Principal: Rebecca Rhodes
- Enrolment: 440 (July 2026)
- Socio-economic decile: 6N
- Website: www.mountainview.school.nz

Mountainview High School is a co-educational state high school in Timaru, New Zealand. The school runs from year nine to thirteen. The school has a roll of 440 students as of July 2026; more than 20 are International students.

The school operates a house system, known as Whānau. The three Whānau – "Hiwi", "Moana", and "Whenua" – compete throughout the year for the Preen Shield.

Mountainview has a 2 hectare farmlet attached, as well as a small vegetable garden and beehives. Where students carry out basic plant propagation.

== History ==
Mountainview High School was founded in 1901, and was originally named Timaru Technical College, and later Timaru College. In 1983 the school relocated to the current Pages Road site and was renamed Mountainview High School. The Timaru Technical College site became Aoraki Polytechnic.

An adjacent site was also purchased by the Ministry of Education for a new 'Timaru North Intermediate' to coincide with Watlington Intermediate in the south of Timaru. After school numbers began to decline the plan was abandoned, and Watlington Intermediate closed in late 2004.

In 2005, Mountainview faced a merger alongside many other secondary schools within the proximity of the South Canterbury District due to educational changes as discussed with Education Minister of New Zealand, Trevor Mallard. Despite the unpopularity of this decision to close down schools to save taxpayer money, many had to comply with governing rule. This resulted in students from other secondary schools (namely Pleasant Point High School) to transfer to Mountainview and integrate with the students already in attendance at Mountainview High School.

== Enrolment ==
As of July 2026, Mountainview High School has roll of 440 students, of which 65 (14.8%) identify as Māori.

As of 2026, the school has an Equity Index of 494, placing it amongst schools whose students have many socioeconomic barriers to achievement (roughly equivalent to decile 4 under the former socio-economic decile system).
