= Craighead Diocesan School =

Coordinates: 44°23′18.16″S 171°13′28.44″E

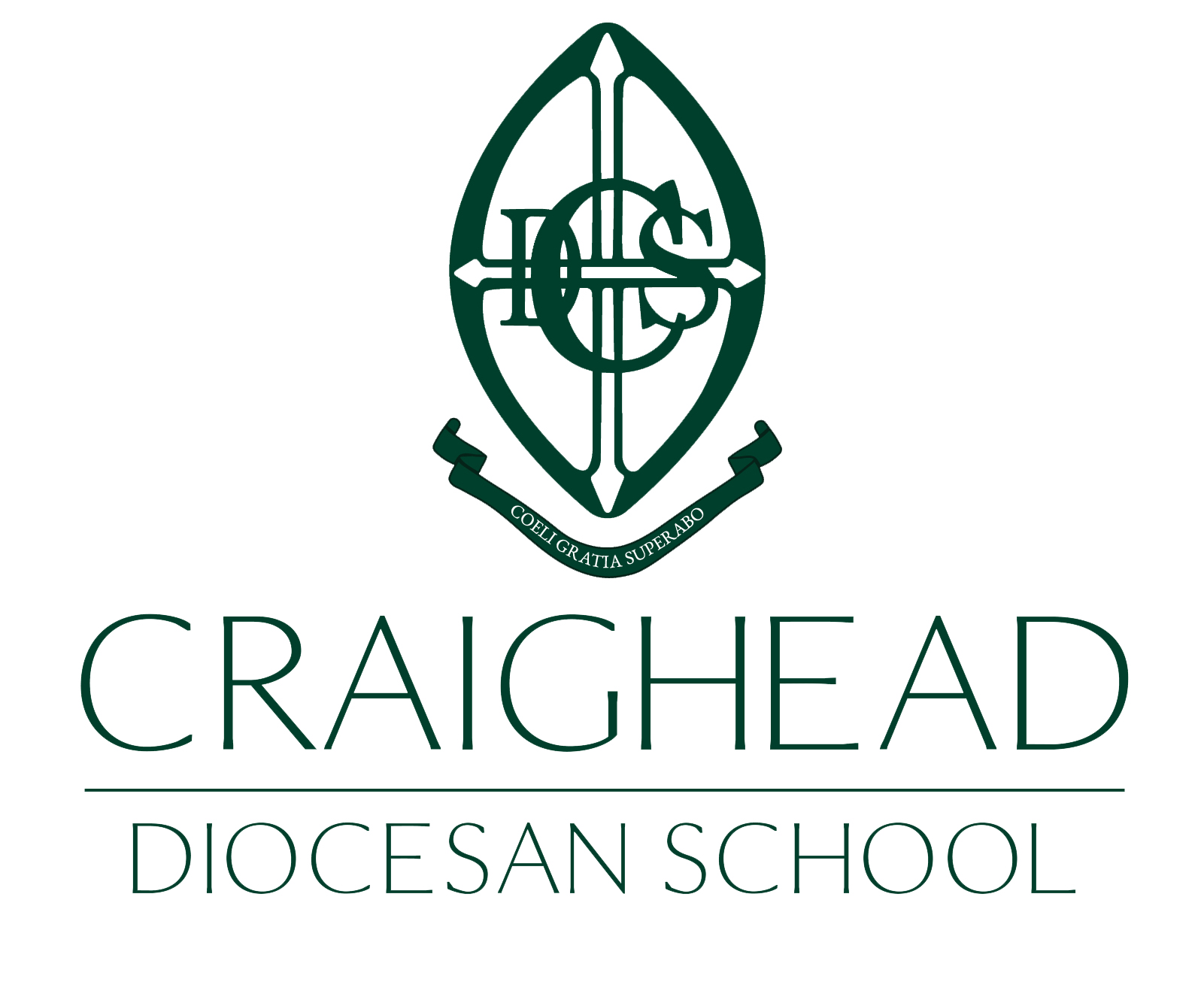

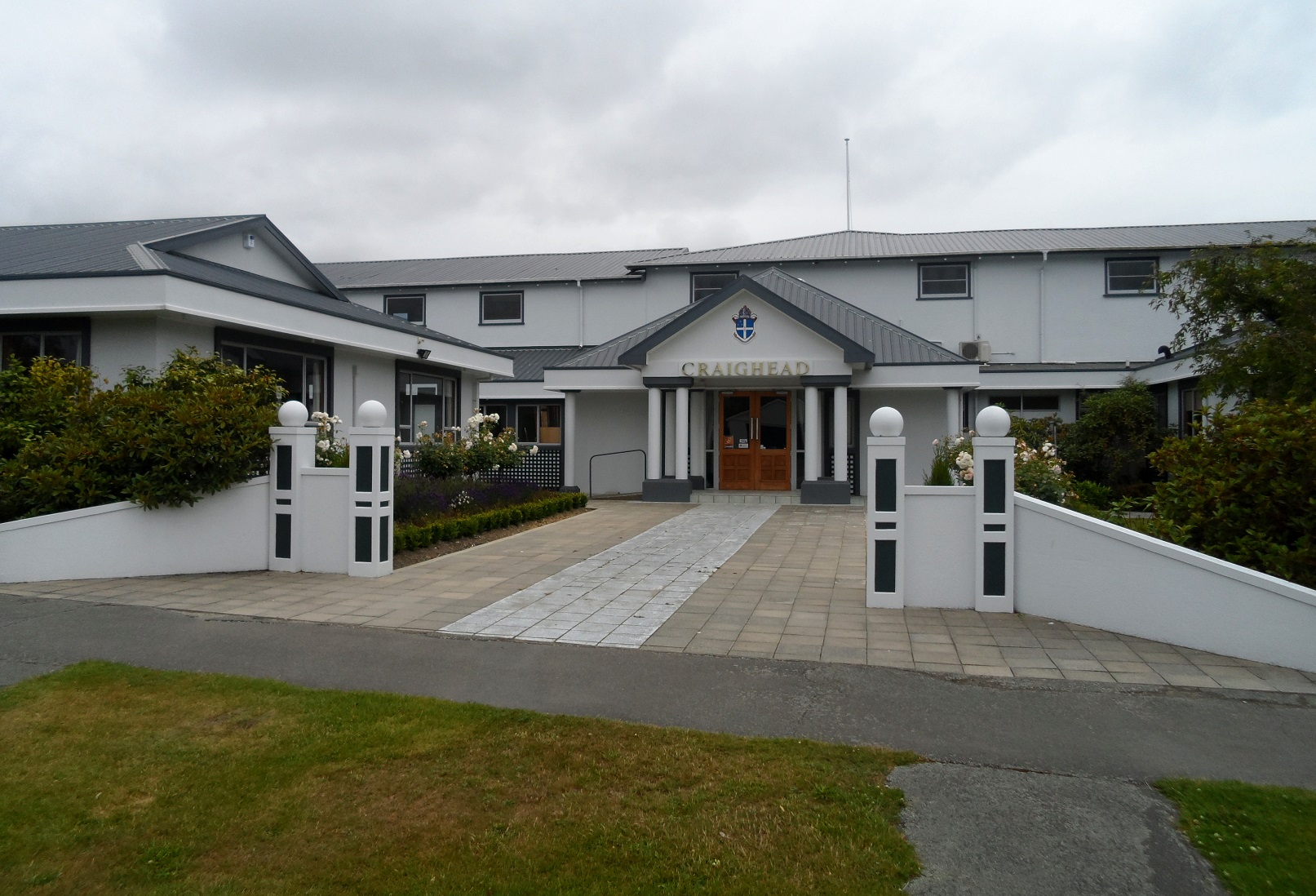

Location
- 1 Wrights Avenue, Timaru, New Zealand 7910

Information
- Type: State-integrated, Girls, Intermediate and Secondary (Years 7–13), with boarding facilities
- Motto: By the Grace of Heaven I will Overcome
- Established: 1911; 115 years ago
- Ministry of Education Institution no.: 357
- Principal: Lara Hearn-Rollo
- Enrolment: 410 July 2026)
- Socio-economic decile: 9
- Website: craighead.school.nz

Craighead Diocesan School is a state-integrated Anglican girls day and boarding school in Highfield, Timaru, New Zealand. It is the only Anglican-affiliated school in South Canterbury.

== History ==
The school was founded in 1911 as Craighead School by Dunedin sisters Eleanor, Fanny, Elizabeth, and Anna Shand. The school's name comes from the house which was its first building, built in 1875 in the then-countryside outside Timaru. The house was named Craighead in 1890 by new owner Henry Le Cren, after his brother-in-law's Scottish castle. The Shand sisters purchased the house in 1910. After 15 years of teaching, the sisters retired, and the running of the school was taken over by the Anglican Church. In 1981, the then-private school was integrated into the state system. From an initial roll of 11 day students and six boarders, the school has grown to a maximum role of 380 as of 2011.

== Enrolment ==
As of July 2026, Craighead Diocesan School has a roll of 410 students, of which 37 (9.0%) identify as Māori.

As of 2026, the school has an Equity Index of 409, placing it amongst schools whose students have few socioeconomic barriers to achievement (roughly equivalent to deciles 8 and 9 under the former socio-economic decile system).

== Notable alumnae ==
- Paddy Bassett – Agricultural Scientist
- Natalie Rooney – Sports Shooter
