= Timaru Girls' High School =

School in Timaru, New Zealand

Location
- Cain Street, Timaru, New Zealand; 44.4054°S 171.2445°E

Information
- Type: State, Girls, Secondary (Year 9–15), with boarding facilities
- Motto: Latin: Scientia Potestas Est "Knowledge is Power"
- Established: 1880
- Ministry of Education Institution no.: 361
- Principal: Deb Hales
- Enrolment: 489 (July 2026)
- Socio-economic decile: 6N
- Website: timarugirls.school.nz

Timaru Girls' High School is a secondary school in Timaru, New Zealand, founded in 1880. Timaru Girls' High provides education for girls aged between 13–18 years of age (class levels – years 9 to 13). It also has a boarding facility within the school grounds for pupils not living in Timaru itself and also caters for international students. The school motto is Scientia Potestas Est – Knowledge is Power. The school is a stone's throw away from the Catholic Roncalli College.

== Enrolment ==
As of July 2026, Timaru Girls' High School has roll of 489 students, of which 78 (16.0%) identify as Māori.

As of 2026, the school has an Equity Index of 474, placing it amongst schools whose students have above average socioeconomic barriers to achievement (roughly equivalent to deciles 5 and 6 under the former socio-economic decile system).

== Houses ==
The school has 4 colour houses named after New Zealand native flowers and each student is put into one of them to encourage team spirit.
The colours are:

- Yellow = Kowhai
- Blue = Konini
- Green = Ngaio
- Red = Rata

There are several House events per year, Swimming Sports, Athletics, Cross Country, Aitkens and Waters Cup Day and House Choirs

== Notable alumnae ==
- Maria Fahey – cricketer
- Jo Goodhew – MP
- Elizabeth Gunn – paediatrician
- Jean Hay – early childhood educator
- Eva Hill – doctor

== Controversy ==
In September 2011, a school girl wanted to support the country's Blue Friday, a nationwide campaign to raise awareness of prostate cancer. She was banned from supporting it because students were only allowed to support female causes, even though the girl's own grandfather had died from this cancer. This raised issues in the newspapers
