= South Canterbury =

Region in South Island, New Zealand

Coordinates: 44°30′S 171°00′E

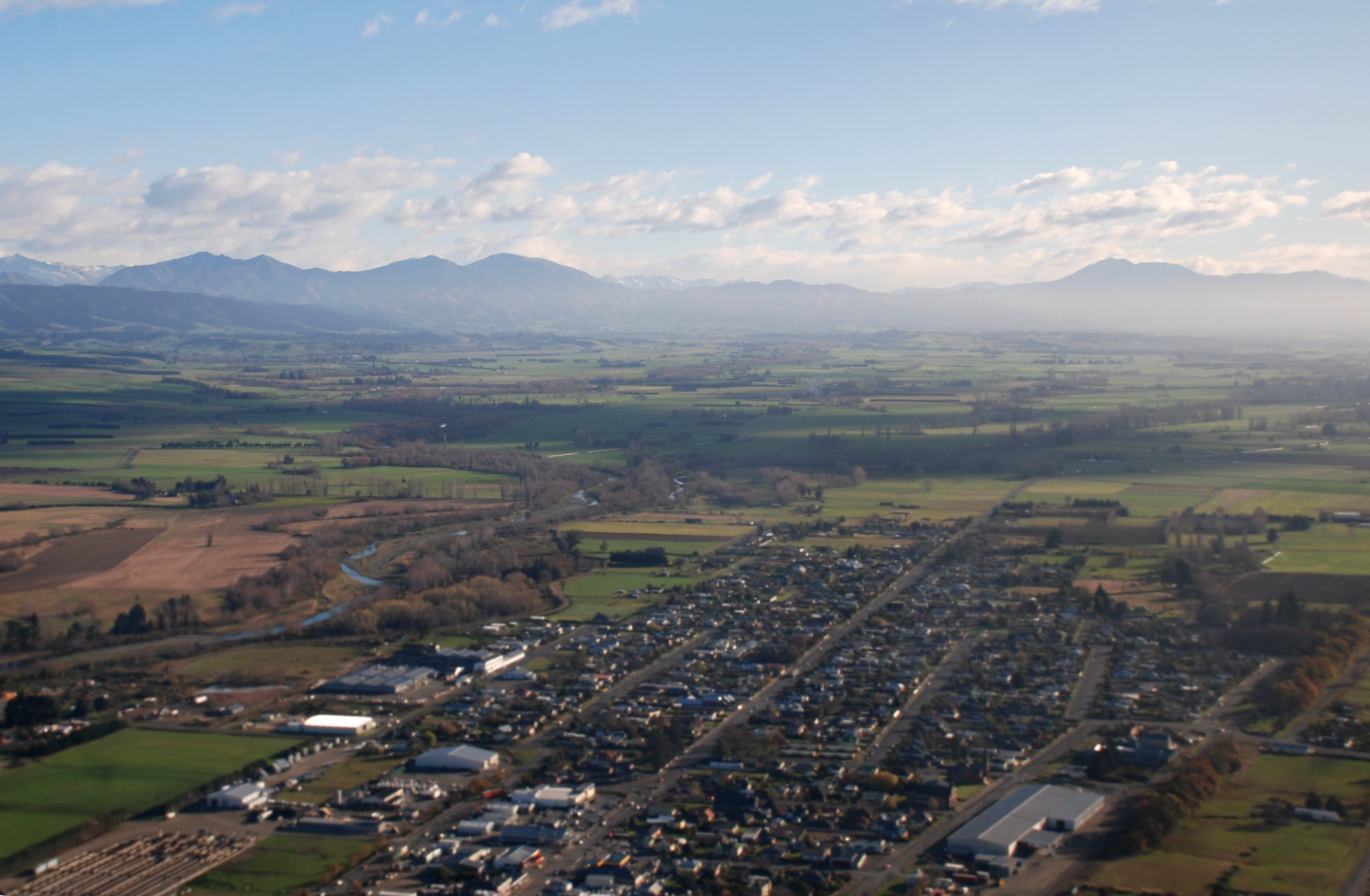
Looking across Temuka and the Canterbury Plains towards the Southern Alps.

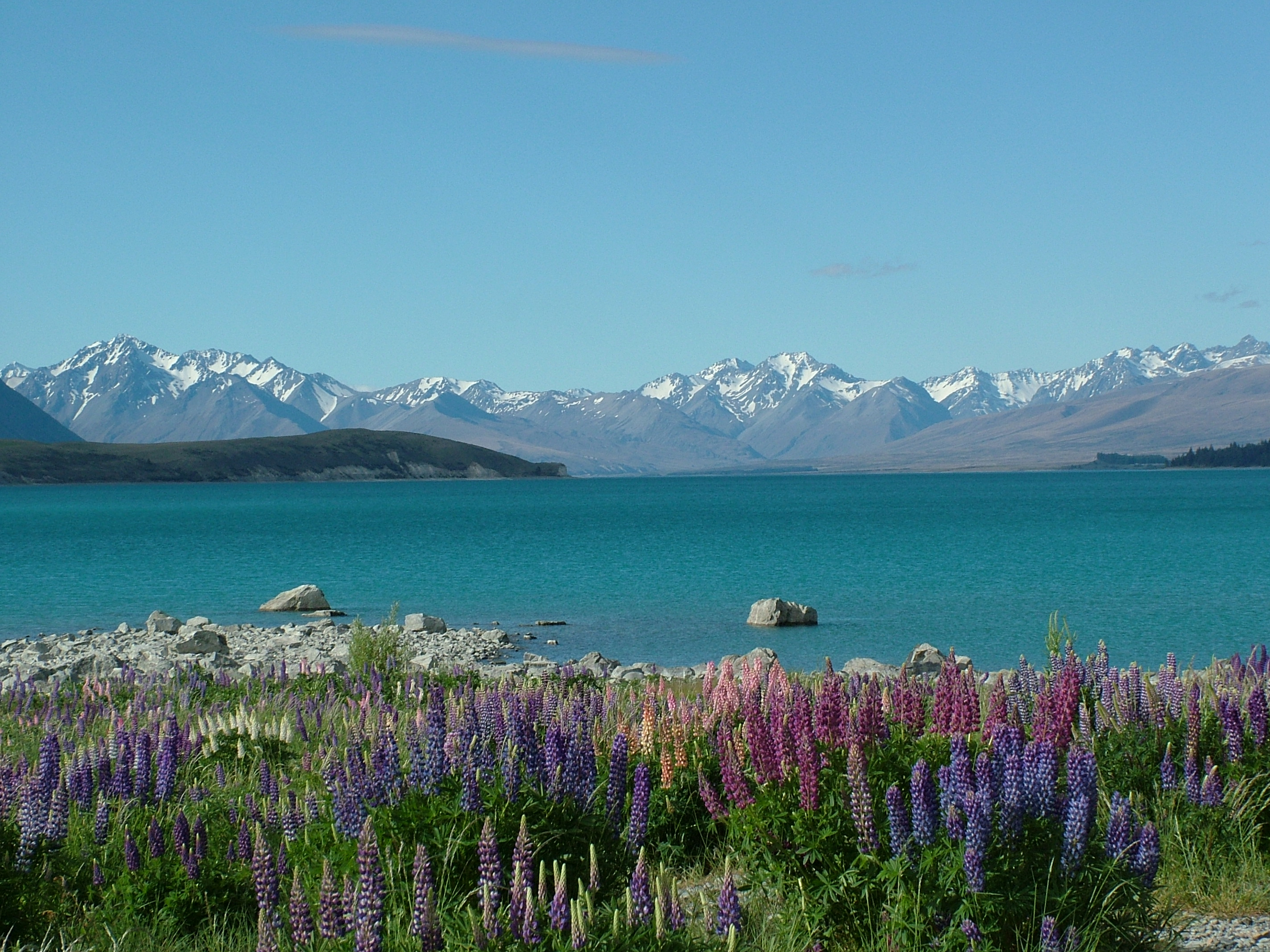
Lake Tekapo, with Aoraki / Mount Cook and the Southern Alps in the background

South Canterbury is the area of the Canterbury Region of the South Island of New Zealand bounded by the Rangitata River in the north and the southern catchment boundary of the Waitaki River (the border with the Otago Region) to the south. The Pacific Ocean and ridge of the Southern Alps form natural boundaries to the east and west respectively. Though the exact boundaries of the region have never been formalised, the term is used for a variety of government agencies (e.g., the South Canterbury District Health Board) and other entities (such as the South Canterbury provincial rugby team). It is one of four traditional sub-regions of Canterbury, along with Mid Canterbury, North Canterbury and Christchurch city.

== Geography ==
South Canterbury's geography covers a wide range of different terrains, from alpine slopes across the glacier carved lakes Tekapo and Pukaki and high country basin of the Mackenzie Country to undulating lowland hills and the Canterbury Plains. Sheep farming is an important industry in the region, as is tourism. In recent years, much like neighbouring Mid Canterbury, there has been an increase in dairy farming, with the large Clandeboye Dairy Factory located north of Temuka. Hydroelectricity generation is a major industry in the southern and western part of South Canterbury, along the catchment of the Waitaki River.

South Canterbury's main urban area is Timaru (population 28,800), which is the second largest centre in the entire Canterbury Region. Other towns in South Canterbury include Temuka, Geraldine, Waimate, Pleasant Point, Fairlie, Twizel, Glenavy and Saint Andrews. South Canterbury's 2013 population was 55,623, about 9% of Canterbury's total population.

== Local government ==
At the local level, South Canterbury is administered by the Canterbury Regional Council and four district councils: Timaru, Mackenzie, Waimate and Waitaki, the latter of which also includes a portion of North Otago. At the national level, most of South Canterbury's rural area is covered, along with much of North Otago, by the Waitaki electorate. Timaru and the coastal strip to the north of it (including Temuka) is part of the Rangitata electorate. Waitaki is regarded as a safe National seat, and Rangitata as a relatively safe seat for the same party, although the city of Timaru itself is seen as being a Labour stronghold. The seat of Waitaki is currently held by Miles Anderson, whilst the seat of Rangitata is held by James Meager, both of whom are members of the National Party.
