= Timaru District Council =

Territorial authority of New Zealand

Coordinates: 44.3975227°S 171.2506428°E

Timaru District Council Te Kaunihera ā-Rohe o Te Tihi o Maru

Type
- Type: Unicameral of Timaru District
- Houses: Governing Body
- Term limits: None

History
- Founded: 6 March 1989

Leadership
- Mayor: Nigel Bowen

Structure
- Seats: 10 (1 mayor, 9 ward seats)
- Length of term: 3 years

Website
- timaru.govt.nz

Timaru District Council (Māori: Te Kaunihera ā-Rohe o Te Tihi o Maru) is the territorial authority for the Timaru District of New Zealand.

The council is led by the mayor of Timaru, who is currently Nigel Bowen. There are also nine councillors.

== Composition ==
=== Councillors ===
- Mayor Nigel Bowen
- Nine other councillors: Deputy Mayor Steve Wills, Allan Booth, Barbara Gilchrist, Richard Lyon, Gavin Oliver, Paddy O'Reilly, Sally Parker, Stu Piddington, Peter Burt

=== Community boards ===
- Geraldine Community Board
- Pleasant Point Community Board
- Temuka Community Board

== History ==
The council was formed in 1989. It replaced Geraldine County Council (1904–1989) and Temuka County Council (1899–1989).

In 2020, the council had 242 staff, including 23 earning more than $100,000. According to the Taxpayers' Union lobby group, residential rates averaged $2,160.

The council withdrew from Local Government New Zealand in September 2021 because it believed that body had not advocated sufficiently against the proposed Three Waters reform programme.
