= List of hospitals in New Zealand =

This is a list of hospitals in New Zealand. It includes hospitals certified by the Ministry of Health, such as public hospitalss, maternity centres, private surgical centres, psychiatric hospitals and hospices. It does not include facilities which are not certified hospitals, such as accident and emergency centres, general practice clinics, fertility clinics, rest homes and veterinary centres.

Name	Coordinates	Location	Territorial authority area	Region	Type	District health board (until 2022)	Beds	Services
Allevia Hospital Epsom	36.8733362°S 174.7677773°E	Epsom	Auckland	Auckland	Private	Auckland	118	Surgical, medical
Alexandra Hospital	41.340722°S 137.3406114°E	Richmond	Tasman	Tasman	Public	Nelson Marlborough	12	Psychogeriatric
Anglesea Hospital	37.7921434°S 175.2823218°E	Hamilton Central	Hamilton	Waikato	Public	Waikato	17	Surgical
Arohanui Hospice	40.4898051°S 175.1043257°E	Roslyn	Palmerston North	Manawatū-Whanganui	Private	MidCentral	11	Medical
Ascot Integrated Hospital	36.8804212°S 174.7681189°E	Remuera	Auckland	Auckland	Private	Auckland	86	Surgical, medical
Ashburn Clinic	45.852209°S 170.457696°E	Halfway Bush	Dunedin	Otago	Private	Southern	46	Mental health
Ashburton Hospital	43.8940722°S 171.7441741°E	Allenton, Ashburton	Ashburton	Canterbury	Public	Canterbury	54	Maternity, medical, surgical
Auckland Adventist Hospital (defunct)	36.861906°S 174.859132°E	Saint Heliers	Auckland	Private	Defunct	6 - 67	Accident, laboratory, physiotherapy, radiology	
Auckland City Hospital / Starship Hospital	36.8595518°S 174.7681969°E	Grafton	Auckland	Auckland	Public	Auckland	1124 (including 219 at Starship)	Children's health, maternity, surgical, medical
Auckland DHB Mental Health Unit	36.8597908°S 174.7563999°E	Grafton	Auckland	Auckland	Public	Auckland	96	Mental health
Auckland Spinal Rehabilitation	36.9578838°S 174.8535152°E	Papatoetoe	Ōtara-Papatoetoe	Auckland	Public	Counties Manukau	20	Medical
Batchelor Hospital / Forth Street Maternity Hospital (defunct)	45.8660°S 170.5145°E	North Dunedin	Dunedin	Otago	Public	Defunct	Unknown	Maternity
Bay of Islands Hospital	35.385517°S 174.069241°E	Kawakawa	Far North	Northland	Public	Northland	20	Medical, maternity, surgical, children's health
Belverdale Hospital	39.9296639°S 175.0504435°E	Whanganui Central	Whanganui	Manawatū-Whanganui	Private	Whanganui	15	Surgical
Bethlehem Birthing Centre	37.6954456°S 176.1039738°E	Bethlehem	Tauranga	Bay of Plenty	Private	Bay of Plenty	12	Maternity
Bidwill Trust Hospital	44.3947239°S 171.2426743°E	Timaru	Timaru	Canterbury	Private	South Canterbury	14	Surgical
Birthcare Auckland	36.8622277°S 174.7775124°E	Parnell	Auckland	Auckland	Private	Auckland	45	Maternity
Birthcare Huntly	37.555696°S 175.1582978°E	Huntly	Waikato	Waikato	Private	Waikato	6	Maternity
Botany Downs Hospital	36.8671895°S 174.6761702°E	Botany Downs	Auckland	Auckland	Public	Counties Manukau	20	Maternity
Boulcott Hospital	41.2035978°S 174.9243913°E	Boulcott	Lower Hutt	Wellington	Private	Hutt Valley	38	Surgical
Bowen Hospital	41.1102528°S 174.5924245°E	Crofton Downs	Wellington	Wellington	Private	Capital and Coast	44	Surgical, medical
Braemar Hospital	37.8076205°S 175.2772431°E	Melville	Hamilton	Waikato	Private	Waikato	89	Surgical, medical
Buchanan Rehabilitation Centre	36.8727748°S 174.7101118°E	Point Chevalier	Auckland	Auckland	Public	Auckland	40	Mental health
Buller Health	41.7488081°S 171.6038604°E	Westport	Buller	West Coast	Public	West Coast	8	Maternity, medical
Burwood Hospital	43.4803896°S 172.6819432°E	Burwood	Christchurch	Canterbury	Public	Canterbury	229	Surgical, mental health, geriatric, medical
Cashmere Sanatorium (defunct)	43.570476°S 172.650773°E	Huntsbury	Christchurch	Canterbury	Public	Defunct	Not limited	Tuberculosis treatment
Central Hawkes Bay Health Centre	40.033003°S 175.9701568°E	Waipukurau	Central Hawke's Bay	Hawke's Bay	Public	Hawke's Bay	8	Medical
Charlotte Jean Maternity Hospital	45.253184°S 169.387884°E	Alexandra	Central Otago	Otago	Private	Southern	4	Maternity
Chatham Island Health Centre	43.95451°S 176.560393°W	Waitangi	Chatham Islands	Chatham Islands	Public	Canterbury	3	Medical
Chelsea Hospital	38.664809°S 178.018221°E	Gisborne Central	Gisborne	Gisborne	Private	Tairawhiti	16	Surgical, medical
Cherry Farm Hospital (defunct)	45.617534°S 170.637782°E	Karitane	Dunedin	Otago	Public	Defunct	400	Psychiatric
Christchurch Hospital	43.5343563°S 172.623398°E	Christchurch Central	Christchurch	Canterbury	Public	Canterbury	833	Medical, surgical, maternity, children's health
Churchill Private Hospital	41.536194°S 173.9433941°E	Witherlea, Blenheim	Marlborough	Marlborough	Private	Nelson Marlborough	9	Surgical
Clutha Health First	46.237226°S 169.740937°E	Balclutha	Clutha	Otago	Private	Southern	18	Maternity, medical
Cornwall Hospital (defunct)	36.898411°S 174.784821°E	Epsom	Auckland	Auckland	Public	Defunct	1000	Maternity, geriatric units
Cranford Hospice	39.7433157°S 176.4558465°E	Raureka, Hastings	Hastings	Hawke's Bay	Private	Hawke's Bay	8	Medical
Crest Hospital	40.3491272°S 175.6094462°E	Papaioea	Palmerston North	Manawatū-Whanganui	Private	MidCentral	30	Surgical, medical
Dannevirke Community Hospital	40.2119189°S 176.0959932°E	Dannevirke	Tararua	Manawatū-Whanganui	Private	MidCentral	11	Maternity, medical
Darfield Hospital	43.4872853°S 172.1152776°E	Darfield	Selwyn	Canterbury	Public	Canterbury	9	Maternity, geriatric, medical
Dargaville Hospital	35.928944°S 173.875109°E	Dargaville	Kaipara	Northland	Public	Northland	19	Mental health, maternity, medical, children's health, surgical
Devonport Defence Health Centre (former hospital)	36.8294199°S 174.7864899°E	Devonport Naval Base, Devonport	Devonport-Takapuna	Auckland	Military	Not certified	25	Medical, hyperbaric oxygen therapy
Dunedin Hospital	45.869706°S 170.508360°E	Dunedin Central	Dunedin	Otago	Public	Southern	361	Geriatric, maternity, surgical, medical, psychogeriatric, children's health
Dunstan Hospital	45.200675°S 169.330831°E	Clyde	Central Otago	Otago	Private	Southern	24	Medical
Elective Surgery Centre	36.782243°S 174.753698°E	Takapuna	Devonport-Takapuna	Auckland	Public	Waitematā	30	Surgical
Ellesmere Hospital	43.7575903°S 172.3001511°E	Leeston	Selwyn	Canterbury	Public	Canterbury	10	Medical, geriatric
Endoscopy Auckland	36.880127°S 174.7703851°E	Epsom	Auckland	Auckland	Private	Auckland	10	Surgical
Forte Health Hospital	43.5260886°S 172.6359329°E	Christchurch Central	Christchurch	Canterbury	Private	Canterbury	30	Surgical
Franklin Memorial Hospital	37.2459498°S 174.7356394°E	Waiuku	Auckland	Auckland	Public	Counties Manukau	18	Geriatric
Gillies Hospital	36.8813516°S 174.7700862°E	Epsom	Auckland	Auckland	Private	Auckland	16	Surgical, medical
Gisborne Hospital	38.638137°S 178.003488°E	Lytton	Gisborne	Gisborne	Public	Tairawhiti	115	Mental health, children's health, maternity, surgical, medical
Grace Hospital	37.742569°S 176.136005°E	Pyes Pa	Tauranga	Bay of Plenty	Private	Bay of Plenty	51	Surgical
Greenlane Clinical Centre formerly Green Lane Hospital	36.8945102°S 174.777252°E	Epsom	Auckland	Auckland	Public	Auckland	31	Surgical, medical
Grey Base Hospital	42.4636512°S 171.1899531°E	Greymouth	Grey	West Coast	Public	West Coast	120	Maternity, surgical, dementia care, medical, geriatric, mental health, children's health
Gore Health	46.103003°S 168.936975°E	Gore	Gore District	Southland	Private	Southern	20	Maternity, medical
Hawera Hospital	39.587728°S 174.266703°E	Hāwera	South Taranaki District	Taranaki	Public	Taranaki	14	Maternity, medical
Hawke's Bay Hospital	39.6286706°S 176.8233744°E	Camberley, Hastings	Hastings	Hawke's Bay	Public	Hawke's Bay	364	Medical, mental health, children's health, maternity, surgical
He Puna Waiora	36.7799065°S 174.7542401°E	Takapuna	Devonport-Takapuna	Auckland	Public	Waitematā	35	Mental health
Helensville Birthing Centre	36.6753745°S 174.449034°E	Helensville	Auckland	Auckland	Private	Waitematā	5	Maternity
Henry Rongomau Bennett Centre	37.8038129°S 175.2812763°E	Hamilton Lake	Hamilton	Waikato	Public	Waikato	97	Mental health
Hillmorton Hospital	43.5481211°S 172.5887335°E	Spreydon	Christchurch	Canterbury	Public	Canterbury	195	Mental health
Horowhenua Health Centre	40.6326466°S 175.2842619°E	Levin	Horowhenua	Manawatū-Whanganui	Public	MidCentral	28	Geriatric, maternity, medical
Hospice Marlborough	41.5354249°S 173.9436298°E	Witherlea, Blenheim	Marlborough	Marlborough	Private	Nelson Marlborough	6	Medical
Hospice North Shore	36.7750877°S 174.7264888°E	Takapuna	Devonport-Takapuna	Auckland	Private	Waitematā	14	Medical
Hospice South Canterbury	44.3858144°S 171.2157235°E	Highfield, Timaru	Timaru	Canterbury	Private	South Canterbury	7	Medical
Hospice Southland	46.439720°S 168.356332°E	Kew	Invercargill	Southland	Private	Southern	8	Medical
Hospice Waikato	37.8028908°S 175.3148964°E	Hillcrest	Hamilton	Waikato	Private	Waikato	12	Medical
Hospice Wanganui	39.906900°S 175.026259°E	Otamatea	Whanganui	Manawatū-Whanganui	Private	Whanganui	5	Medical
Hutt Hospital	41.2045168°S 174.9226535°E	Boulcott	Lower Hutt	Wellington	Public	Hutt Valley	322	Maternity, geriatric, surgical, mental health, medical, children's health, psychogeriatric
Kaikoura Hospital	42.4046628°S 173.6793146°E	Kaikōura	Kaikōura	Canterbury	Public	Canterbury	21	Geriatric, medical, maternity
Kaitaia Hospital	35.119262°S 173.260981°E	Kaitaia	Far North	Northland	Public	Northland	32	Mental health, surgical, children's health, maternity, medical
Kapiti Health Centre	40.9103178°S 175.0052207°E	Paraparaumu	Kāpiti Coast	Wellington	Public	Capital and Coast	2	Maternity
Karori Lunatic Asylum (defunct)	41.284682°S 174.741601°E	Karori	Wellington	Wellington	Public	Defunct	23	Psychiatric
Kenepuru Hospital	41.1467893°S 174.8323305°E	Kenepuru	Porirua	Wellington	Public	Capital and Coast	131	Maternity, medical, mental health, surgical, psychogeriatric
Kensington Hospital	35.708324°S 174.320103°E	Kensington	Whangarei	Northland	Private	Northland	19	Surgical
Kingseat Hospital (defunct)	37°6′S 174°52′E	Karaka	Auckland	Auckland	Public	Defunct	800	Psychiatric
Lake Alice Hospital (defunct)	40.1258°S 175.3369°E	Lake Alice	Rangitikei	Manawatū-Whanganui	Public	Defunct	960	Psychiatric
Lakes District Hospital	45.023181°S 168.736226°E	Queenstown	Queenstown Lakes	Southland	Public	Southern	15	Medical, maternity
Lincoln Maternity Hospital	43.6352162°S 172.4869435°E	Lincoln	Selwyn	Canterbury	Public	Canterbury	7	Maternity
Manuka Street Hospital	41.2787454°S 173.2881433°E	Nelson Central	Nelson	Nelson	Private	Nelson Marlborough	22	Surgical
Manukau Surgery Centre	37.0082724°S 174.8850646°E	Wiri	Auckland	Auckland	Public	Counties Manukau	78	Surgical
Mary Potter Hospice	41.1102528°S 174.5924245°E	Newtown	Wellington	Wellington	Private	Capital and Coast	22	Medical
Mason Clinic	36.8750972°S 174.704138°E	Point Chevalier	Auckland	Auckland	Public	Auckland	109	Mental health
Matariki Hospital	38.0184837°S 175.3248278°E	Te Awamutu	Waipa	Waikato	Public	Waikato	32	Geriatric, medical
Mercy Hospice	36.8672665°S 174.7812352°E	Freemans Bay	Auckland	Auckland	Private	Auckland	13	Medical
Mercy Hospital	45.861147°S 170.498998°E	Maori Hill	Dunedin	Otago	Private	Southern	66	Surgical
Mercy Integrated Hospital	36.8733362°S 174.7677773°E	Epsom	Auckland	Auckland	Private	Auckland	105	Surgical, medical
Middlemore Hospital	36.9640701°S 174.8383995°E	Māngere	Māngere-Ōtāhuhu	Auckland	Public	Counties Manukau	905	Geriatric, mental health, children's health, maternity, surgical, medical, psychogeriatric
Motueka Maternity Unit	41.129544°S 173.008036°E	Motueka	Tasman	Tasman	Public	Nelson Marlborough	5	Maternity
Mount View Lunatic Asylum (defunct)	41.306114°S 174.7810835°E	Mount Cook	Wellington	Wellington	Public	Defunct	250	Psychiatric
Murchison Hospital and Health Centre	41.8058995°S 172.3260231°E	Murchison	Tasman	Tasman	Public	Nelson Marlborough	8	Medical, rest home care
National Women's Hospital (defunct)	36.895194°S 174.779436°E	Epsom	Auckland	Auckland	Public	Defunct	1000	Obstetrics, gynaecology
Nelson Hospital	41.2871429°S 173.2692324°E	Nelson South	Nelson	Nelson	Public	Nelson Marlborough	191	Mental health, medical, surgical, maternity, children's health
Nelson Marlborough Health Mental Health Admission Unit	41.287452°S 173.2682885°E	Nelson South	Nelson	Nelson	Public	Nelson Marlborough	26	Mental health
Nelson Tasman Hospice	41.3242538°S 173.2273632°E	Stoke	Nelson	Nelson	Private	Nelson Marlborough	10	Medical
Nga Hau Mangere Birthing Centre	36.9713734°S 174.7950322°E	Māngere	Māngere-Ōtāhuhu	Auckland	Private	Counties Manukau	20	Maternity
North Haven Hospice	35.694876°S 174.332472°E	Tikipunga	Whangarei	Northland	Private	Northland	8	Medical
North Shore Hospital	36.7821018°S 174.7548627°E	Takapuna	Devonport-Takapuna	Auckland	Public	Waitematā	663	Maternity, medical, geriatric, children's health, surgical, psychogeriatric, mental health
Nurse Maude Hospice	43.5338727°S 172.5623288°E	St Albans	Christchurch	Canterbury	Private	Canterbury	11	Medical
Oamaru Hospital	45.099467°S 170.968253°E	Oamaru	Waitaki	Otago	Private	Southern	44	Geriatric, maternity, medical
Ormiston Surgical & Endoscopy	36.9647953°S 174.9032061°E	Flat Bush	Auckland	Auckland	Private	Counties Manukau	32	Surgical, medical
Otago Community Hospice	45.848185°S 170.532076°E	North East Valley	Dunedin	Otago	Private	Southern	12	Medical
Oxford Hospital	43.3028112°S 172.1897368°E	Oxford	Waimakariri	Canterbury	Public	Canterbury	15	Medical, geriatric
Palmerston North Hospital	40.3382811°S 175.6168614°E	Roslyn	Palmerston North	Manawatū-Whanganui	Public	MidCentral	354	Mental health, children's health, maternity, surgical, psychogeriatric, medical, geriatric
Papakura Obstetric Hospital	37.0621487°S 174.9430593°E	Papakura	Auckland	Auckland	Public	Counties Manukau	13	Maternity
Pitman House	36.8736399°S 174.7082434°E	Point Chevalier	Auckland	Auckland	Public	Auckland	10	Mental health
Porirua Hospital Campus Mental Health Services	41.1467893°S 174.8323305°E	Kenepuru	Porirua	Wellington	Public	Capital and Coast	18	Mental health
Porirua Lunatic Asylum (defunct)	41.141037°S 174.831952°E	Kenepuru	Porirua	Wellington	Public	Defunct	700 - 1500	Psychiatric
Princess Margaret Hospital (defunct)	43.570538°S 172.61885°E	Cashmere	Christchurch	Canterbury	Public	Canterbury	53	Psychogeriatric, medical, mental health
Pukekohe Hospital	37.2178024°S 174.9018199°E	Pukekohe	Auckland	Auckland	Public	Counties Manukau	32	Geriatric, maternity
Pukeora Sanatorium (defunct)	39.981786°S 176.500784°E	Waipukurau	Central Hawke's Bay	Hawke's Bay	Public	Defunct	100	Tuberculosis treatment
Puna Whiti	36.8922943°S 175.6710532°E	Hamilton Lake	Hamilton	Waikato	Public	Waikato	5	Mental health
Quay Park Surgical	36.847517°S 174.7722983°E	Auckland CBD	Auckland	Auckland	Private	Auckland	4	Surgical
Queen Mary Hospital (Hanmer Springs) (defunct)	42.523581°S 172.828718°E	Hanmer Springs	Hurunui	Canterbury	Public	Defunct	Unknown	Psychiatric, addictions, alcoholism
Queen Mary Hospital (defunct)	45.8690235°S 170.5083406°E	Dunedin Central	Dunedin	Otago	Public	Defunct	Unknown	Maternity
Rangiora Hospital	43.2891387°S 172.5891225°E	Rangiora	Waimakariri	Canterbury	Public	Canterbury	16	Medical, maternity
Remuera Surgical Care	36.8738338°S 174.7817034°E	Remuera	Auckland	Auckland	Private	Auckland	4	Surgical
Rhoda Read Hospital	37.6454686°S 175.5154521°E	Morrinsville	Matamata-Piako	Waikato	Public	Waikato	32	Geriatric, medical
River Ridge East Birth Centre	37.7883295°S 175.2880706°E	Hamilton East	Hamilton	Waikato	Private	Waikato	20	Maternity
Rotorua Hospital	38.1312696°S 176.2476261°E	Ohinemutu	Rotorua	Bay of Plenty	Public	Lakes	233	Children's health, maternity, surgical, medical, geriatric, mental health
Royston Hospital	39.6413644°S 176.8328669°E	Raureka, Hastings	Hastings	Hawke's Bay	Private	Hawke's Bay	33	Surgical, medical
Seacliff Lunatic Asylum (defunct)	45.675254°S 170.622091°E	Seacliff	Dunedin	Otago	Public	Defunct	500	Psychiatric
Seaview Asylum (defunct)	42.706336°S 170.974857°E	Seaview, Hokitika	Westland	West Coast	Public	Defunct	22-549	Psychiatric
Seddon Memorial Hospital (defunct)	46.1136922°S 168.942903°E	Gore	Gore District	Southland	Public	Defunct	130	Medical, maternity, aged care
Selina Sutherland Hospital	40.9474935°S 175.6713245°E	Lansdowne	Masterton	Wellington	Private	Wairarapa	10	Surgical
Southern Cross Auckland Surgical Centre	36.8739242°S 174.777725°E	Remuera	Auckland	Auckland	Private	Auckland	17	Surgical
Southern Cross Hospital Brightside	36.8791008°S 174.7687274°E	Epsom	Auckland	Auckland	Private	Auckland	43	Surgical, medical
Southern Cross Hospital Christchurch	43.5202485°S 172.6329178°E	Christchurch Central	Christchurch	Canterbury	Private	Canterbury	86	Surgical, medical
Southern Cross Hospital Hamilton	37.7889646°S 175.2881821°E	Hamilton East	Hamilton	Waikato	Private	Waikato	60	Medical, surgical
Southern Cross Hospital Invercargill	46.407077°S 168.353568°E	Invercargill Central	Invercargill	Southland	Private	Southern	26	Surgical, medical
Southern Cross Hospital New Plymouth	39.0586923°S 174.0638001°E	New Plymouth Central	New Plymouth	Taranaki	Private	Taranaki	24	Surgical, medical
Southern Cross Hospital North Harbour	36.7700676°S 174.7303662°E	Wairau Valley	Kaipātiki	Auckland	Private	Waitematā	59	Surgical, medical
Southern Cross Hospital Rotorua	38.158313°S 176.239251°E	Springfield	Rotorua	Bay of Plenty	Private	Lakes	17	Medical, surgical
Southern Cross Hospital Wellington	41.3094629°S 174.7732074°E	Newtown	Wellington	Wellington	Private	Capital and Coast	37	Surgical
St George's Hospital	43.5105583°S 172.6167017°E	Strowan	Christchurch	Canterbury	Private	Canterbury	93	Maternity, surgical
Southland Hospital	46.439005°S 168.357157°E	Kew	Invercargill	Southland	Public	Southern	168	Surgical, geriatric, maternity, medical, mental health, children's health
St Helens Hospital Auckland (defunct)	36.8744645°S 174.7204225°E	Mount Albert	Auckland	Auckland	Public	Defunct	32 - 52	Maternity
St Helens Hospital Invercargill (defunct)	46.4212469°S 168.3646317°E	Georgetown	Invercargill	Southland	Public	Defunct	10	Maternity
St Helens Hospital Sydenham (defunct)	43.5436623°S 172.6314703°E	Sydenham	Christchurch	Canterbury	Public	Defunct	30	Maternity
St Helens Hospital Wanganui (defunct)	39.943912°S 175.037783°E	Gonville	Whanganui	Manawatū-Whanganui	Public	Defunct	12	Maternity
St Marks Road Surgical Centre	36.8735538°S 174.7782106°E	Remuera	Auckland	Auckland	Private	Auckland	4	Surgical
Sunnyside Hospital (defunct)	43.5509°S 172.5929°E	Hillmorton	Christchurch	Canterbury	Defunct	Public	123 - 348	Psychiatric
Taihape Health	39.6812348°S 175.7956642°E	Taihape	Rangitikei	Manawatū-Whanganui	Private	Whanganui	2	Maternity
Tamahere Hospital and Healing Centre	37.8570226°S 175.3892878°E	Tamahere	Waikato	Waikato	Private	Waikato	31	Mental health
Tamaki Oranga	36.9577901°S 174.8533875°E	Papatoetoe	Ōtara-Papatoetoe	Auckland	Public	Counties Manukau	20	Mental health
Taranaki Base Hospital	39.071906°S 174.056710°E	Westown	New Plymouth	Taranaki	Public	Taranaki	194	Surgical, medical, mental health, children's health, maternity
Taumarunui Hospital	38.8891431°S 175.2500973°E	Taumarunui	Ruapehu	Waikato	Public	Waikato	14	Maternity, medical
Taupo Hospital	38.699116°S 176.099557°E	Hilltop	Taupō	Waikato	Public	Lakes	36	Surgical, medical, maternity
Tauranga Hospital	37.707407°S 176.148804°E	Tauranga South	Tauranga	Bay of Plenty	Public	Bay of Plenty	360	Psychogeriatric, geriatric, mental health, children's health, maternity, surgical and medical
Te Awakairangi Birthing Centre	41.2040427°S 174.9096135°E	Hutt Central	Lower Hutt	Wellington	Private	Hutt Valley	12	Maternity
Te Awamutu Birthing	38.0067454°S 175.3371935°E	Te Awamutu	Waipa	Waikato	Private	Waikato	7	Maternity
Te Kūiti Hospital	38.334222°S 175.1506407°E	Te Kūiti	Waitomo	Waikato	Public	Waikato	16	Maternity, medical
Te Omanga Hospice	41.203091°S 174.8827532°E	Woburn	Lower Hutt	Wellington	Private	Hutt Valley	10	Medical
Te Papaioea Birthing Centre	40.3412898°S 175.6214284°E	Roslyn	Palmerston North	Manawatū-Whanganui	Private	MidCentral	12	Maternity
Te Rangimarie Hospice	39.073619°S 174.058206°E	Westown	New Plymouth	Taranaki	Private	Taranaki	6	Medical
Timaru Hospital	44.408356°S 171.256527°E	Parkside, Timaru	Timaru	Canterbury	Public	South Canterbury	132	Medical, mental health, children's health, maternity, surgical
Timatanga Hou - Detox Unit	35.930620°S 173.871132°E	Dargaville	Kaipara	Northland	Public	Northland	8	Mental health
Tipahi Street Mental Health	40.5791355°S 166.0297692°E	Nelson South	Nelson	Nelson	Public	Nelson Marlborough	13	Mental health
Thames Hospital	37.1364397°S 175.5422467°E	Thames	Thames-Coromandel	Waikato	Public	Waikato	52	Maternity, surgical, medical
Tokanui Psychiatric Hospital (defunct)	38°3′46″S 175°19′40″E	Tokanui	Waipa	Waikato	Public	Defunct	1000	Psychiatric
Tokoroa Hospital	38.2305391°S 175.858325°E	Tokoroa	South Waikato	Waikato	Public	Waikato	21	Maternity, medical
Totara Hospice	37.0040465°S 174.9155036°E	The Gardens	Auckland	Auckland	Private	Counties Manukau	18	Medical
Townley St Helens Hospital (defunct)	0°N 0°E	Elgin, Gisborne	Gisborne	Gisborne	Public	Defunct	6	Maternity
Tuarangi Home	43.9061441°S 171.7511082°E	Ashburton Central, Ashburton	Ashburton	Canterbury	Public	Canterbury	37	Geriatric, psychogeriatric, rest home care, dementia care, medical
Waikari Hospital	42.9669839°S 172.6846052°E	Waikari	Hurunui	Canterbury	Public	Canterbury	10	Geriatric, medical, maternity
Waikato Hospital	37.3316256°S 174.4662808°E	Hamilton Lake	Hamilton	Waikato	Public	Waikato	673	Medical, geriatric, children's health, maternity, surgical
Waipuna Hospice	37.6965935°S 176.0908361°E	Te Puna	Tauranga	Bay of Plenty	Private	Bay of Plenty	12	Medical
Wairarapa Hospital	40.9475853°S 175.6723565°E	Lansdowne	Masterton	Wellington	Public	Wairarapa	89	Surgical, medical, psychiatric, children's health, maternity
Wairau Hospital	41.5361567°S 173.941315°E	Witherlea, Blenheim	Marlborough	Marlborough	Public	Nelson Marlborough	100	Surgical, maternity, children's health, medical
Wairoa Hospital & Health Centre	39.0415211°S 177.4124237°E	Wairoa	Wairoa	Hawke's Bay	Public	Hawke's Bay	12	Maternity, medical
Waitakere Hospital	36.8702993°S 174.6280573°E	Henderson	Henderson-Massey	Auckland	Public	Waitematā	392	Geriatric, children's health, surgical, mental health, maternity, medical
Wakari Hospital	45.859008°S 170.472966°E	Halfway Bush	Dunedin	Otago	Public	Southern	90	Intellectual, medical, mental health
Wakefield Hospital	41.3167973°S 174.7771576°E	Newtown	Wellington	Wellington	Private	Capital and Coast	71	Surgical, medical
Ward OPR1	36.864°S 174.7779584°E	Hamilton Lake	Hamilton	Waikato	Public	Waikato	15	Mental health
Waterford Birth Centre	37.7931905°S 175.2867599°E	Hamilton Central	Hamilton	Waikato	Private	Waikato	10	Maternity
Wellington Hospital	41.3085872°S 174.778601°E	Newtown	Wellington	Wellington	Public	Capital and Coast	484	Children's health, maternity, surgical, medical
Wellington Hospital Mental Health Services	41.3085872°S 174.778601°E	Newtown	Wellington	Wellington	Public	Capital and Coast	29	Mental health
Wellsford Birthing Unit	36.2925215°S 174.5224384°E	Wellsford	Auckland	Auckland	Private	Waitematā	2	Maternity
Whakatāne Hospital	37.9650924°S 176.9768278°E	Whakatāne	Whakatane	Bay of Plenty	Public	Bay of Plenty	96	Maternity, surgical, medical, mental health, children's health
Whanganui Hospital	39.943912°S 175.037783°E	Gonville	Whanganui	Manawatū-Whanganui	Public	Whanganui	172	Children's health, maternity, surgical, medical, geriatric, mental health
Whangarei Hospital	35.736333°S 174.303447°E	Woodhill	Whangarei	Northland	Public	Northland	249	Mental health, maternity, medical, psychiatric, children's health, surgical
Whau Lunatic Asylum (defunct)	36.874975°S 174.706332°E	Point Chevalier	Auckland	Auckland	Public	Defunct	494	Psychiatric
Wilson Centre	36.7998837°S 174.7858688°E	Hauraki	Devonport-Takapuna	Auckland	Public	Waitematā	26	Physical, children's health
Winton Maternity Centre	46.134797°S 168.325685°E	Winton	Southland	Southland	Private	Southern	6	Maternity
