= Sharon Shea =

New Zealand chairperson, health administrator and lawyer

Sharon Shea MNZM
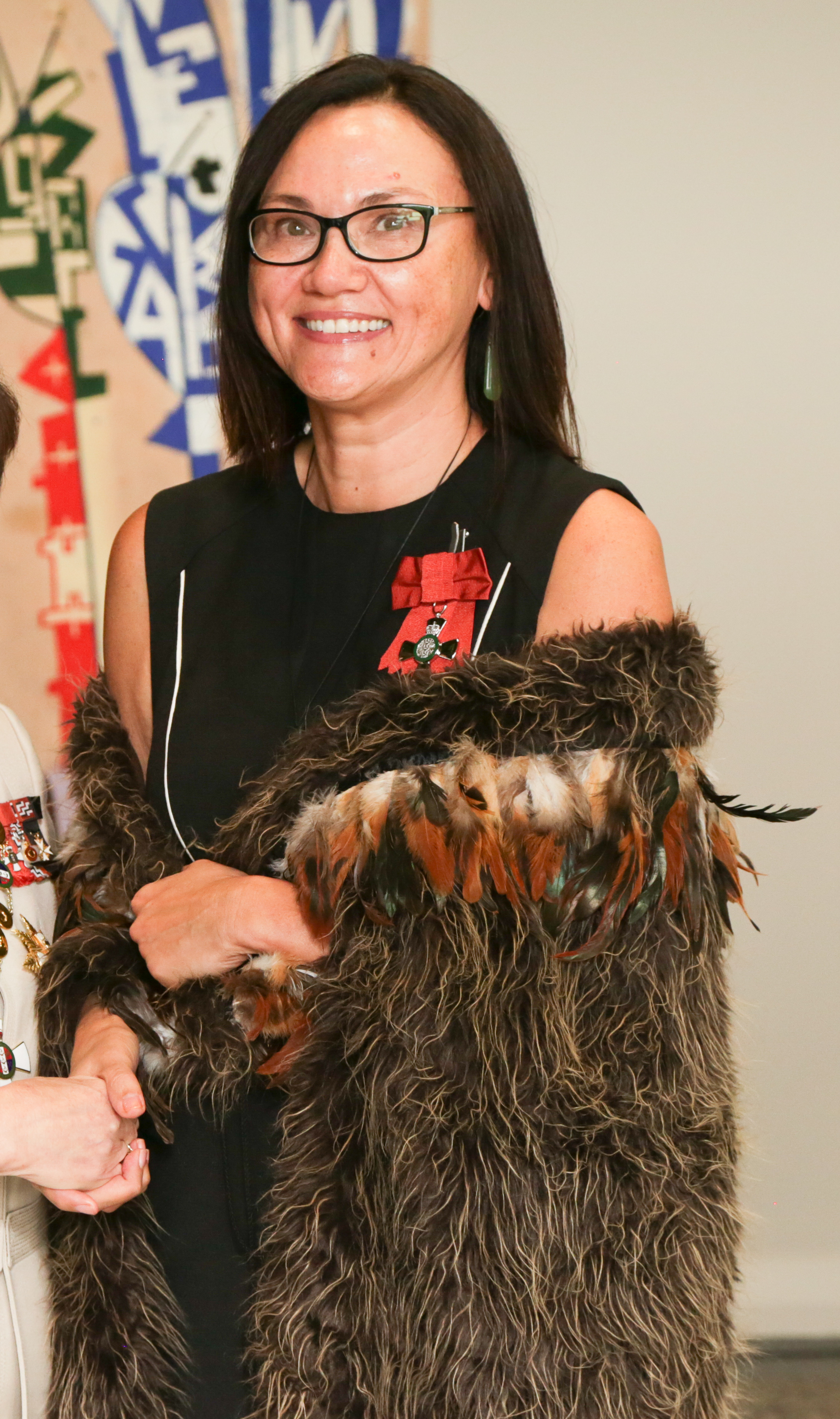
- Shea in 2019 wearing a korowai
- Born: Sharon Norma Shea; Tauranga Hospital, Tauranga, New Zealand
- Occupations: Chairperson, board member
- Known for: Health governance
- Spouse: Morris Pita
- Children: three boys

Sharon Norma Shea MNZM is a New Zealand chairperson. She has various governance roles and holds board memberships, mainly in the health sector. She was the penultimate chairperson of the Bay of Plenty District Health Board before its disestablishment and the co-chairperson of the establishment board of the Māori Health Authority.

== Early life and family ==
Sharon was born at Tauranga Hospital and belongs to the Borrell and Tangitū family, with her iwi affiliations Ngāti Ranginui and Ngāi Te Rangi. Her hapū is Pirirākau. She was raised in Te Puna and then in Mount Maunganui. She received her education at Omanu School, Mount Maunganui Intermediate, and Tauranga Girls' College. At the University of Auckland, she graduated with a conjoint Bachelor of Arts and Bachelor of Laws degree. She is married to Morris Pita and they both went to England to study for a master's degree at the University of Oxford in 2001 and 2002; Shea gained a degree in comparative social policy. They returned to New Zealand in 2002 or 2003 (sources differ) to start a family. Shea and Pita have three boys.

== Professional career ==
Shea initially worked as a lawyer but has worked in the health sector since the mid-1990s and describes herself as "a recovering lawyer". She is a director on a number of company boards and owns several companies herself. She was the strategy manager for the Northern Regional Health Authority. Regional health authorities were succeeded in 2001 by District health boards, and those have governance boards that are partially elected (seven members) and partially appointed (up to four members; appointed by the minister of health). Shea was appointed to the Northland District Health Board taking effect on 6 December 2010. (Note: DHB membership commences in early December following the local elections in October of every third year—in this case the 2010 local elections—and lasts for three years after the next local elections.) She was reappointed twice and served until 4 December 2019. In December 2016, she was concurrently appointed to also be a board member of Auckland District Health Board where she served one term. At both Northland and Auckland DHBs, she chaired subcommittees. With effect of 9 December 2019, Shea was appointed deputy-chair to Michael Cullen on the Bay of Plenty District Health Board. Cullen stood down from most of his public roles in March 2020 after announcing that he had been diagnosed with stage IV small-cell lung cancer Shea was appointed acting interim chair and board member Ron Scott was appointed acting deputy chair. On 13 April 2021, Shea was appointed as permanent chair, with Geoff Esterman appointed as her permanent deputy chair.

In 2018, the government initiated a review of the health and disability system. She was chairperson of the Māori Expert Advisory Group that was established for this review. The major outcome of this review is that district health boards are to be disestablished, to be replaced by one central agency, Health New Zealand, with a Māori Health Authority working alongside it to manage Māori health policies, services, and outcomes. Government announced the governance team of these new agencies in September 2021 and Shea was appointed to the board of Health New Zealand and co-chair of the Māori Health Authority alongside Tipa Mahuta. (Note: Mahuta is deputy-chair of Counties Manukau District Health Board and a younger sister of Nanaia Mahuta) One of the issues that Shea wants to address is vaccine hesitancy by Māori, resulting in low vaccination rates. Apart from people living in remote areas having difficulty with access, there is distrust in authority caused by "post-colonisation trauma". She stated that "some of the issues are intergenerational and they're complex and they're not going to be solved by an ad on TV." She sees the Māori Health Authority having a role in a "mātauranga Māori [Māori knowledge]-informed COVID-19 roll-out".

Shea is one of five trustees of the MAS Foundation, a philanthropic organisation that belongs to the mutual society MAS, with membership made up mainly of New Zealand health professionals.

== Awards ==
In the 2019 New Year Honours, Shea was appointed Member of the New Zealand Order of Merit (MNZM) "for services to Māori health and development".
