= Margie Apa =

New Zealand healthcare manager

Fepulea‘i Margie Apa
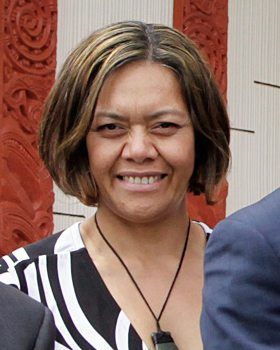
- Born: 1972/1973 (age 53–54); Ōtara, Auckland, New Zealand
- Education: University of Auckland; Victoria University of Wellington
- Employer(s): Counties Manukau District Health Board; Te Whatu Ora

Fepulea‘i Margie Apa (born 1973/1974) is a New Zealand healthcare manager. As chief executive of Counties Manukau District Health Board from 2018 to 2022, Apa was the first Samoan to be head of a district health board in New Zealand.

== Early life and education ==
Apa was born in New Zealand in 1973 or 1974. Her parents Fepulea‘i Filo and Seulu Hana were Samoan emigrants from Savai'i and Apia. She grew up in Ōtara. She attended Papatoetoe High School. At the University of Auckland she gained a Bachelor of Commerce degree, followed by a Master of Public Policy from Victoria University of Wellington.

== Career ==
While at the University of Auckland, Apa won a scholarship from the State Services Commission that funded her studies and gave her work opportunities. Early in her career, she worked on the review of the 1995 Cave Creek disaster. Later, she worked in the labour market policy group at the Department of Labour. From 2003 to 2007, Apa was general manager of Pacific health at the Counties Manukau District Health Board (DHB).

From 2007 to 2012, Apa was deputy director-general for sector capability and implementation at the Ministry of Health. She returned to Counties Manukau DHB in 2012 as director, population health and strategy and was appointed the DHB's chief executive in 2018. She was the first Samoan to lead a DHB in New Zealand.

The New Zealand government announced in 2021 that two new health authorities, Te Whatu Ora (Health New Zealand) and the Māori health authority Te Aka Whai Ora, would be created in 2022 to replace the district health boards. Apa was appointed in December 2021 as chief executive of the interim Health New Zealand, heading the organisation from July 2022. She resigned from the role on 7 February 2025 four months ahead of the end of her contract.

She has also been chair of Presbyterian Support, and is on the board of World Vision.

== Personal life ==
Her husband is Riki Apa. They have two adult daughters.

Her title Fepulea‘i is a chiefly title from her father's village in Savai'i.
