= Kirikiriroa =

Kirikiriroa may refer to:

- The Māori name for Hamilton, New Zealand
- Kirikiriroa statistical area within Hamilton
- Kirikiriroa marae and meeting house in Pipiriki
