= Waikato District Health Board =

District health board of New Zealand

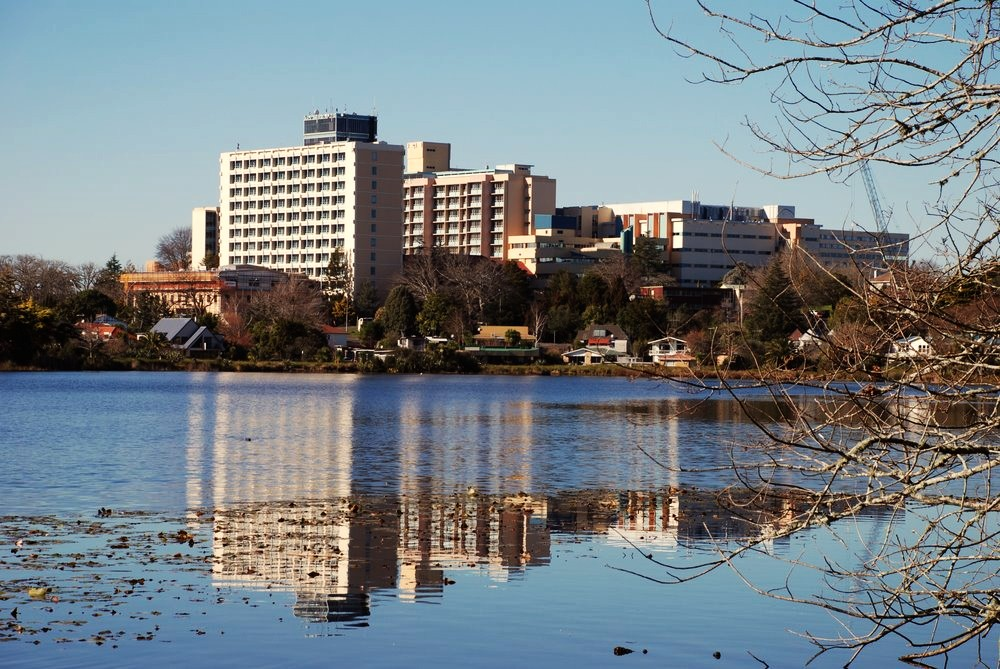
- Waikato Hospital, the health board's largest hospital

- Location of the Waikato DHB (green) in New Zealand
- Formation: 1 January 2001; 25 years ago
- Founder: New Zealand Government
- Dissolved: 1 July 2022; 4 years ago
- Legal status: Active
- Purpose: DHB
- Services: Health and disability services
- Parent organization: Ministry of Health
- Website: www.waikatodhb.health.nz

The Waikato District Health Board (Waikato DHB) was a district health board that provided healthcare to the Waikato region of New Zealand.

== History ==
The Waikato District Health Board, like most other district health boards, came into effect on 1 January 2001 established by the New Zealand Public Health and Disability Act 2000.

=== 2021 Ransomware attack ===
In mid-May 2021, the Waikato District Health Board's hospital computer systems and phone lines were affected by a ransomware attack. On 25 May, an unidentified group claimed responsibility for the hack and issued an ultimatum to the Waikato DHB, having obtained sensitive data about patients, staff and finances. Hackers later dumped confidential medical, financial and patients' data onto the dark web, forcing the DHB to work with cyber-experts to minimise any potential privacy disclosures.

The Waikato DHB and New Zealand Government ruled out paying the ransom. By mid-June 2021, the Waikato DHB had managed to restore most health services and operations but faced a backlog of outpatient appointments due to the disruption caused by the ransomware attack.

=== Dissolution ===
On 1 July 2022, the Waikato DHB and the 19 other district health boards were disestablished, with Te Whatu Ora (Health New Zealand) assuming their former functions and operations including hospitals and health services. The Waikato DHB was brought under Te Whatu Ora's Te Manawa Taki division.

== Geographic area ==
The area covered by the Waikato District Health Board is defined in Schedule 1 of the New Zealand Public Health and Disability Act 2000 and based on territorial authority and ward boundaries as constituted as at 1 January 2001. The area can be adjusted through an Order in Council.

== Governance ==
The initial board was fully appointed. From the 2001 local elections, until 8 May 2019, the board was partially elected (seven members) and in addition, up to four members were appointed by the Minister of Health. After the Board divided over an issue, they were replaced by Dr Karen Poutasi as Commissioner. The minister had also appointed the chairperson and deputy-chair from the pool of eleven board members.

== Demographics ==
Historical population
Year	Pop.	±% p.a.
2006	339,189	—
2013	359,310	+0.83%
2018	405,558	+2.45%

Waikato DHB served a population of 405,558 at the 2018 New Zealand census, an increase of 46,248 people (12.9%) since the 2013 census, and an increase of 66,369 people (19.6%) since the 2006 census. There were 144,243 households. There were 199,959 males and 205,599 females, giving a sex ratio of 0.97 males per female. The median age was 37.1 years (compared with 37.4 years nationally), with 85,497 people (21.1%) aged under 15 years, 81,351 (20.1%) aged 15 to 29, 174,111 (42.9%) aged 30 to 64, and 64,599 (15.9%) aged 65 or older.

Ethnicities were 73.7% European/Pākehā, 23.9% Māori, 4.6% Pacific peoples, 10.0% Asian, and 2.4% other ethnicities. People may identify with more than one ethnicity.

The percentage of people born overseas was 19.7, compared with 27.1% nationally.

Although some people objected to giving their religion, 50.2% had no religion, 35.1% were Christian, 1.8% were Hindu, 1.0% were Muslim, 0.8% were Buddhist and 3.9% had other religions.

Of those at least 15 years old, 61,023 (19.1%) people had a bachelor or higher degree, and 64,365 (20.1%) people had no formal qualifications. The median income was $29,800, compared with $31,800 nationally. 48,411 people (15.1%) earned over $70,000 compared to 17.2% nationally. The employment status of those at least 15 was that 154,875 (48.4%) people were employed full-time, 47,331 (14.8%) were part-time, and 14,454 (4.5%) were unemployed.

== Hospitals ==
=== Waikato Hospital campus ===
- Waikato Hospital (37.3316256°S 174.4662808°E) is the district health board's main public hospital. It has 673 beds and provides medical, geriatric, children's health, maternity and surgical services.
- Henry Rongomau Bennett Centre (37.8038129°S 175.2812763°E) is a public mental health service with 97 beds.
- Puna Whiti (36.8922943°S 175.6710532°E) is a public mental health service with four beds.
- Ward OPR1 (36.864°S 174.7779584°E) is a public mental health service with 15 beds.
- Braemar Hospital (37.8076205°S 175.2772431°E), adjacent to the hospital campus, is a private hospital with 89 beds which provides surgical and medical services.

=== Other public hospitals ===
- Te Kūiti Hospital (38.334222°S 175.1506407°E) in Te Kūiti, Waitomo has 16 beds and provides maternity and medical services.
- Matariki Hospital (38.0184837°S 175.3248278°E) in Te Awamutu, Waipa has 32 beds and provides geriatric and medical services.
- Rhoda Read Hospital (37.6454686°S 175.5154521°E) in Morrinsville, Matamata-Piako has 32 beds and provides geriatric and medical services.
- Thames Hospital (37.1364397°S 175.5422467°E) in Thames, Thames-Coromandel has 52 beds and provides maternity, surgical and medical services.
- Tokoroa Hospital ( 38.2305391°S 175.858325°E) in Tokoroa, South Waikato has 21 beds and provides maternity and medical services.
- Taumarunui Hospital (38.8891431°S 175.2500973°E) in Taumarunui, Ruapehu has 14 beds and provides maternity and medical services.

=== Other private hospitals ===
- Southern Cross Hospital Hamilton (37.7889646°S 175.2881821°E) in Hamilton East has 60 beds and provides medical and surgical services.
- River Ridge East Birth Centre (37.7883295°S 175.2880706°E) in Hamilton East has 20 beds and provides maternity services.
- Anglesea Hospital (37.7921434°S 175.2823218°E) in Hamilton Central has 17 beds and provides surgical services.
- Waterford Birth Centre (37.7931905°S 175.2867599°E) in Hamilton Central has 10 beds and provides maternity services.
- Hospice Waikato (37.8028908°S 175.3148964°E) in Hillcrest has 12 beds and provides medical services.
- Te Awamutu Birthing (38.0067454°S 175.3371935°E) in Te Awamutu, Waipa has seven beds and provides maternity services.
- Birthcare Huntly (37.555696°S 175.1582978°E) in Huntly, Waikato District has six beds and provides maternity services.
- Tamahere Hospital and Healing Centre (37.8570226°S 175.3892878°E) in Tamahere, Waikato District has 31 beds and provides mental health services.
