= Hamilton West, New Zealand =

Suburb of Hamilton, New Zealand

Hamilton West
- Suburb
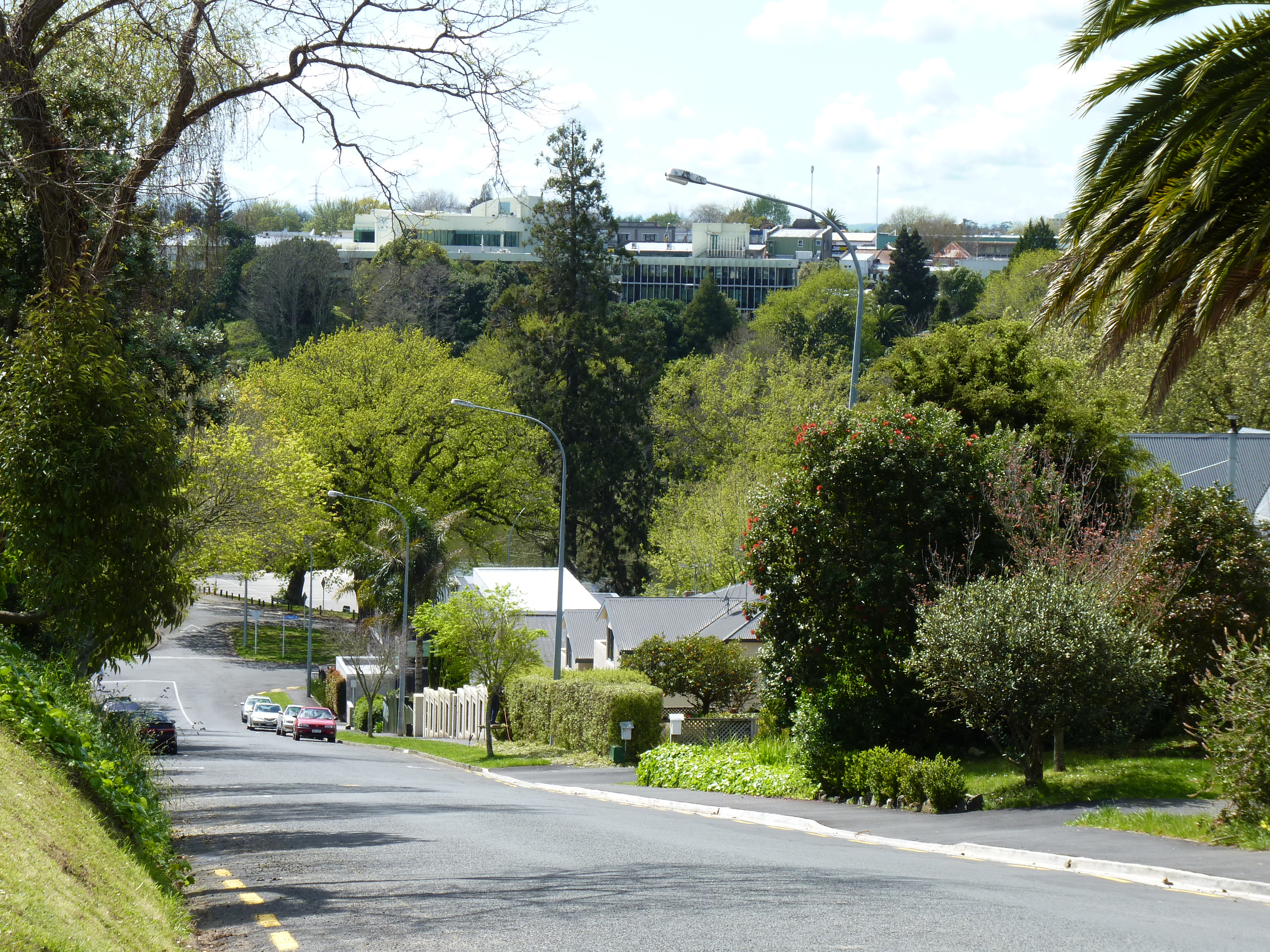
- Radnor Street in Hamilton West, Hamilton.
- Interactive map of Hamilton West
- Coordinates: 37°47′47.13″S 175°17′0.51″E
- Country: New Zealand
- City: Hamilton, New Zealand
- Local authority: Hamilton City Council
- Electoral ward: West Ward

Area
  - Land: 40 ha (99 acres)

Population (June 2025)
  - Total: 1,300
  - Density: 3,300/km^{2} (8,400/sq mi)

	Hamilton Central
Hamilton Lake	Hamilton West	Hamilton East
	Melville

Hamilton West is a suburb in western Hamilton in New Zealand.

Hamilton Lake (a.k.a. Lake Rotoroa) is located to the west. To the east is the Waikato River and the Victoria Bridge, which links with Hamilton East on the other side of the river. To the north are Hamilton Central (the business and shopping centre of the city) and then Hamilton North. To the south is the suburb of Melville.

Hamilton West is located close to the central part of the city of Hamilton, known as Hamilton Central, where notable attractions bordering on Hamilton West include Waikato Museum and St Peter's Cathedral, the Anglican cathedral for the Diocese of Waikato, both on Victoria Street.

The former office of the Waikato District Hospital and Charitable Aid Board, now Diggers Bar and Café is located in the suburb.

== Demographics ==
Hamilton West covers 0.40 km^{2} (0.15 sq mi) and had an estimated population of 1,300 as of June 2025, with a population density of 3,250 people per km^{2}.

Historical population
Year	Pop.	±% p.a.
2006	1,422	—
2013	1,020	−4.64%
2018	1,218	+3.61%
2023	1,209	−0.15%
The 2006 population is for a larger area of 0.91 km^{2}. Source:

Hamilton West had a population of 1,209 in the 2023 New Zealand census, a decrease of 9 people (−0.7%) since the 2018 census, and an increase of 189 people (18.5%) since the 2013 census. There were 540 males, 663 females and 6 people of other genders in 564 dwellings. 5.2% of people identified as LGBTIQ+. The median age was 33.9 years (compared with 38.1 years nationally). There were 150 people (12.4%) aged under 15 years, 318 (26.3%) aged 15 to 29, 543 (44.9%) aged 30 to 64, and 201 (16.6%) aged 65 or older.

People could identify as more than one ethnicity. The results were 55.6% European (Pākehā); 19.6% Māori; 4.7% Pasifika; 30.5% Asian; 2.7% Middle Eastern, Latin American and African New Zealanders (MELAA); and 2.0% other, which includes people giving their ethnicity as "New Zealander". English was spoken by 96.0%, Māori language by 4.7%, Samoan by 0.5%, and other languages by 26.1%. No language could be spoken by 1.7% (e.g. too young to talk). New Zealand Sign Language was known by 0.7%. The percentage of people born overseas was 42.9, compared with 28.8% nationally.

Religious affiliations were 33.3% Christian, 8.4% Hindu, 3.2% Islam, 1.5% Māori religious beliefs, 1.7% Buddhist, 0.5% New Age, and 4.2% other religions. People who answered that they had no religion were 40.7%, and 6.2% of people did not answer the census question.

Of those at least 15 years old, 423 (39.9%) people had a bachelor's or higher degree, 408 (38.5%) had a post-high school certificate or diploma, and 225 (21.2%) people exclusively held high school qualifications. The median income was $43,700, compared with $41,500 nationally. 105 people (9.9%) earned over $100,000 compared to 12.1% nationally. The employment status of those at least 15 was that 549 (51.8%) people were employed full-time, 120 (11.3%) were part-time, and 48 (4.5%) were unemployed.

== Education ==
Hamilton West School is a coeducational state primary school for years 1 to 8 with a roll of 701 as of July 2025. The school was established in 1864.

== See also ==
- Hamilton West electoral ward
- Suburbs of Hamilton, New Zealand
