= Waikato Hospital =

Coordinates: 37°48′15.51″S 175°16′56.26″E

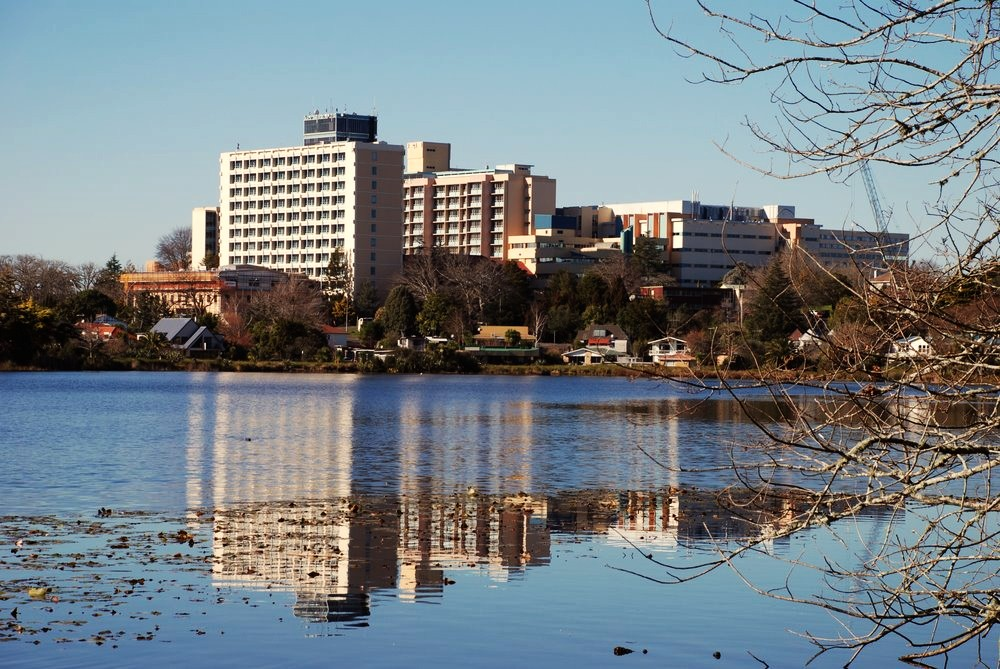
- Waikato Hospital seen across Hamilton Lake.

Geography
- Location: Hamilton, Waikato, New Zealand

Organisation
- Care system: Public
- Type: Tertiary teaching hospital, base hospital for the Waikato region

Services
- Emergency department: Yes
- Beds: 759

History
- Founded: 1 December 1886; 139 years ago

Links
- Website: www.waikatodhb.health.nz
- Lists: Hospitals in New Zealand

Waikato Hospital is a major regional hospital in Hamilton, New Zealand. It provides specialised and emergency healthcare for the Midlands and Waikato area with patients referred there from feeder hospitals like Whakatāne, Lakes area, Tauranga, Thames, Tokoroa and Rotorua.

== Facilities ==
Waikato District Health Board employs more than 6000 people and plans, funds and provides hospital and health services to more than 372,865 people in a region covering eight per cent of New Zealand. Specialist services include:

- Anaesthesiology
- Cardiac surgery / cardiology
- Dermatology
- Emergency medicine
- Endocrinology
- Gastroenterology
- General surgery
- Gynaecology
- Haematology
- Intensive care / Neonatal intensive care
- Neurology
- Neurosurgery
- Obstetrics
- Oncology
- Ophthalmology
- Orthopedic surgery
- Oral and maxillofacial surgery
- Otolaryngology
- Paediatric surgery
- Paediatrics
- Plastic surgery
- Psychiatry
- Radiology
- Renal care
- Respiratory care
- Urological care
- Vascular surgery

The centre is the main trauma facility for the area, and close connection to road and air transport (air ambulances, helicopter or fixed wing plane) allow patient-hospital transport in less than an hour from any place in the region.

Waikato Hospital is home to one of New Zealand's four burns units. The unit primarily serves patients from the Waikato, Bay of Plenty, Gisborne and Taranaki regions.

The hospital has a 41-cot neonatal unit. It is one of six "level 3" neonatal units in New Zealand, equipped to care for babies born prior to 28 weeks gestation or weighing below 1000 grams.

=== Henry Rongomau Bennett Centre ===
The Henry Rongomau Bennett Centre is the inpatient mental health unit for the Waikato DHB, located on the Waikato Hospital site. The centre consists of seven secure wards, including two forensic psychiatric wards providing mental health services to the Department of Corrections.

In October 2019, the New Zealand Government announced NZ$100 million in funding for replacement of the facility, dependent on a final business case due in 2021.

=== Puna Whiti ===
Puna Whiti is a small rehabilitation ward for mental health patients. It is located across the road from the Henry Bennett Centre on Hague Road. It can only accommodate five patients at a time.

=== Older Persons and Rehabilitation Building ===
The Older Persons and Rehabilitation Building is a mental health facility purpose-built for providing mental health, health and rehabilitation services for older people. It is on Pembroke Street across the road from the main hospital, and is connected to the main hospital buildings by a pedestrian bridge. Ward OPR1 has 15 beds. Art works by Susan Skerman are installed in the building.The perspex panels screen printed with images of trees and ferns are pieces from Skerman's work Bush Panels which she created for the Expo '70 in Osaka.

=== Other services ===
The hospital has an academic division of the Faculty of Medicine and Health Science, University of Auckland, acting as a teaching and training centre for undergraduates and postgraduate medical and allied health science students. There is a dedicated training facility, the Bryant Education Centre. Research is also undertaken in cooperation with the Ruakura Agricultural Research Centre and the University of Waikato.

The hospital also has five chaplains who help perform social services and provide counselling, assisted by volunteers. The services are part-funded by the Ministry of Health, churches and donations. The hospital also operates 'Hilda Ross House', a hospital hotel owned by the District Health Board.

== History ==
The foundation stone of the first ward of the hospital to be built in brick was laid on 1 July 1905 by Andrew Primrose, Esq., J.P. The decision to expand the hospital had been made the previous year by the Waikato District Hospital and Charitable Aid Board (of which Andrew Primrose was a member since its institution) since the demand for admission had more than three times outgrown the accommodation. During the ceremony to lay the foundation stone Primrose was presented with a silver trowel (which was on display prior to the ceremony in the window of a shop owned by a Mr. Howden) which was engraved with the inscription:

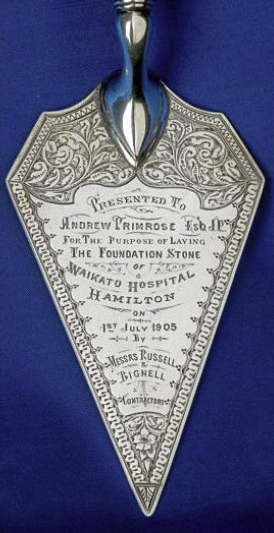
The silver trowel presented to Andrew Primrose Esq., J.P. on 1 July 1905

Presented to Andrew Primrose, Esq., J.P., for the purpose of laying the foundation stone of the Waikato Hospital, Hamilton, from Messers Russell and Bagnell, July 1st, 1905.

Diggers Bar and Café in Hamilton West was once the office of the Waikato District Hospital and Charitable Aid Board.

Plastic surgeon Sir Archibald McIndoe trained as a house surgeon at Waikato hospital prior to working in the US and UK with his cousin Harold Gillies. Mary Reidy was also a key figure in the preservation of the hospital.
