= Bay of Plenty District Health Board =

District health board of New Zealand

- Location of the Bay of Plenty DHB (green) in New Zealand
- Abbreviation: BOPDHB
- Formation: 1 January 2001; 25 years ago
- Founder: New Zealand Government
- Dissolved: 1 July 2022; 4 years ago
- Legal status: Active
- Purpose: DHB
- Services: Health and disability services
- Parent organization: Ministry of Health
- Website: www.bopdhb.govt.nz

The Bay of Plenty District Health Board (Bay of Plenty DHB or BOPDHB) was a district health board with the focus on providing healthcare to the Bay of Plenty area of New Zealand. In 2022, the Bay of Plenty DHB was dissolved as part of a national overhaul of the district health board system. Its former functions and responsibilities were assumed by Te Whatu Ora (Health New Zealand).

== History ==
The Bay of Plenty District Health Board, like most other district health boards, came into effect on 1 January 2001 established by the New Zealand Public Health and Disability Act 2000.

On 1 July 2022, the Bay of Plenty DHB was dissolved, with Te Whatu Ora (Health New Zealand) assuming responsibility for its hospitals and health services. Its former functions and operations were taken over by Te Whatu Ora's Te Manawa Taki division.

== Geographic area ==
The area covered by the Bay of Plenty District Health Board was defined in Schedule 1 of the New Zealand Public Health and Disability Act 2000 and based on territorial authority and ward boundaries as constituted as at 1 January 2001. The area initially identified was Tauranga District, (Note: Between 1989 and 2003, the area now known as Tauranga City was Tauranga District.) Western Bay of Plenty District, Whakatāne District, Kawerau District, and Ōpōtiki District. The area could be adjusted through an Order in Council, which happened on 27 April 2001, by clause 7 of the Health (Constituencies of District Health Boards) Order 2001, when Mayor Island / Tuhua and Mōtītī Island were added to the area.

== Governance ==
The initial board was fully appointed. From the 2001 local elections, the board was partially elected (seven members) and in addition, up to four members were appointed by the Minister of Health. The minister also appointed the chairperson and deputy-chair from the pool of eleven board members.

=== Chairperson ===
The following table gives a list of chairpersons of Bay of Plenty District Health Board:

| | Name | Portrait | Term | Notes |
|---|---|---|---|---|
| 1 | Robin Wray | | 2001 | |
| 2 | Mary Hackett | | 2001–2010 | |
| 3 | Sally Webb | | 2010–2019 | |
| 4 | Michael Cullen | | 2019–2020 | |
| 5 | Sharon Shea | | 2021 – 16 Dec 2021 | Acting chair from 2020 |
| 6 | Bev Edlin | | 16 Dec 2021 – June 2022 | |

== Demographics ==
Historical population
| Year | Pop. | ±% p.a. |
|---|---|---|
| 2006 | 194,931 | — |
| 2013 | 205,995 | +0.79% |
| 2018 | 240,183 | +3.12% |

Bay of Plenty DHB served a population of 240,183 at the 2018 New Zealand census, an increase of 34,188 people (16.6%) since the 2013 census, and an increase of 45,252 people (23.2%) since the 2006 census. There were 87,105 households. There were 117,069 males and 123,111 females, giving a sex ratio of 0.95 males per female. The median age was 41.3 years (compared with 37.4 years nationally), with 48,942 people (20.4%) aged under 15 years, 40,413 (16.8%) aged 15 to 29, 103,791 (43.2%) aged 30 to 64, and 47,034 (19.6%) aged 65 or older.

Ethnicities were 76.8% European/Pākehā, 25.7% Māori, 3.0% Pacific peoples, 6.4% Asian, and 1.8% other ethnicities. People may identify with more than one ethnicity.

The percentage of people born overseas was 18.8, compared with 27.1% nationally.

Although some people objected to giving their religion, 50.1% had no religion, 34.3% were Christian, 0.9% were Hindu, 0.2% were Muslim, 0.5% were Buddhist and 6.9% had other religions.

Of those at least 15 years old, 33,576 (17.6%) people had a bachelor or higher degree, and 36,312 (19.0%) people had no formal qualifications. The median income was $29,500, compared with $31,800 nationally. 28,698 people (15.0%) earned over $70,000 compared to 17.2% nationally. The employment status of those at least 15 was that 88,737 (46.4%) people were employed full-time, 29,433 (15.4%) were part-time, and 7,626 (4.0%) were unemployed.

== Hospitals ==
=== Public hospitals ===
- Tauranga Hospital (37.707407°S 176.148804°E) in Tauranga Central, Tauranga has 360 beds and provides psychogeriatric, geriatric, mental health, children's health, maternity, surgical and medical services.
- Whakatāne Hospital (37.9650924°S 176.9768278°E) in Whakatāne, Whakatāne District has 96 beds and provides maternity, surgical, medical, mental health and children's health services.

In addition to the public hospitals the Bay of Plenty District Health Board Funds:

- The Te Kaha Medical Centre
- The Opotiki Health Centre (partial funding partnership)

=== Private hospitals ===
- Bethlehem Birthing Centre (37.6954456°S 176.1039738°E) in Bethlehem, Tauranga has 12 beds and provides maternity services.
- Grace Hospital (37.742569°S 176.136005°E) in Pyes Pa, Tauranga has 51 beds and provides surgical services.
- Waipuna Hospice (37.6965935°S 176.0908361°E) in Te Puna, Tauranga has 12 beds and provides medical services.
