= Tokanui Psychiatric Hospital =

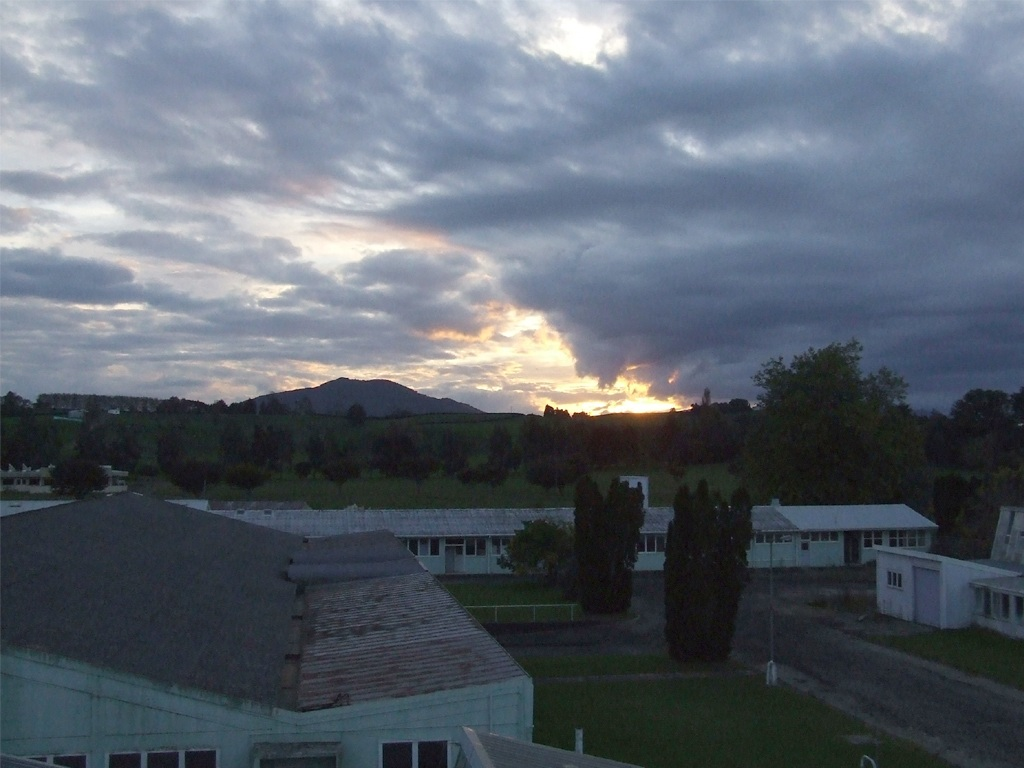
- Sunset over Tokanui Hospital

Geography
- Location: New Zealand
- Coordinates: 38°3′46″S 175°19′40″E

Organisation
- Type: Specialist

Services
- Speciality: Psychiatric hospital

History
- Opened: July 1912
- Closed: March 1998

Links
- Lists: Hospitals in New Zealand

Tokanui Psychiatric Hospital was a psychiatric hospital located approximately 14 kilometres (8.7 mi) south of Te Awamutu, New Zealand.

== History ==
Tokanui Hospital was opened in July, 1912, and was closed in March 1998. The first patients travelled from another psychiatric hospital in Wellington by train. The hospital was self-sufficient in its early days, with its own farm, bakery, laundry, and even a sewing room where patients' clothes were made. At its peak there were over a thousand patients living in the hospital, but by the late 1960s the beginning of the end was coming. In 1974, the government decided no more buildings were to be erected in the large psychiatric hospitals, and small psychiatric wards began to be opened attached to general hospitals in urban areas.

Patients who had lived for years of their lives at the hospital were thoroughly institutionalised and saw the hospital as home, while other patients who came for shorter periods suffering from clinical depression, anxiety, OCD, etc., felt isolated and missed their families and friends.^{source?} The catchment area for the hospital extended to New Plymouth on the west coast and Gisborne on the east coast, and up towards Auckland, and across to the Bay of Plenty. Patients from these areas found it difficult to maintain contact, and over time became isolated from their families.

The Hospital Board put aside money in the early 1990s to set up residential services in the community for both intellectually disabled and chronically mentally ill patients, and two trusts were formed to develop these services (Rakau Ora, now called Pathways, and the Waikato Community Living Trust). The move towards closure gained momentum, and by March 1998, the last long-stay patient had left the site.

The land had been taken originally under the Public Works Act for the hospital, and since has been land banked with the Office for Treaty Settlements to revert to its original owners (the local hapu and iwi). Many of the buildings remain intact, although the Nurses Home, G Ward, and H Ward have been demolished.

There is a cemetery on the old hospital farm which contains the remains of over 500 patients, both Maori and European, buried there between 1912 and 1968. After this time pauper patients were buried in the local Te Awamutu cemetery. The farm is now run by Ministry of Agriculture, and there is a memorial stone at the cemetery site. As of 2016, there was a ceremony to unveil a memorial wall that had the names of those buried there, initiated by Maurice Zinsli, whose Great-Aunt Maria is buried there.

== Current use ==
The hospital farm was handed over for agricultural research in the 1970s. The hospital buildings remain derelict, and the site is not used, though parts have been fenced off for grazing. The fifty or so staff houses are rented out, and the sewerage system which used to be run by the hospital is still in operation to service these homes, managed by Waikato District Health Board.

== Security ==
While most valuable items have been removed, large amounts of copper spouting remains on some of the buildings. Other materials which may be attractive to thieves are still in place, as none of the buildings have been demolished. Health hazards also exist, namely asbestos insulation. Because of this, October Protection Security watch this area 24/7
