= Pukeora Sanatorium =

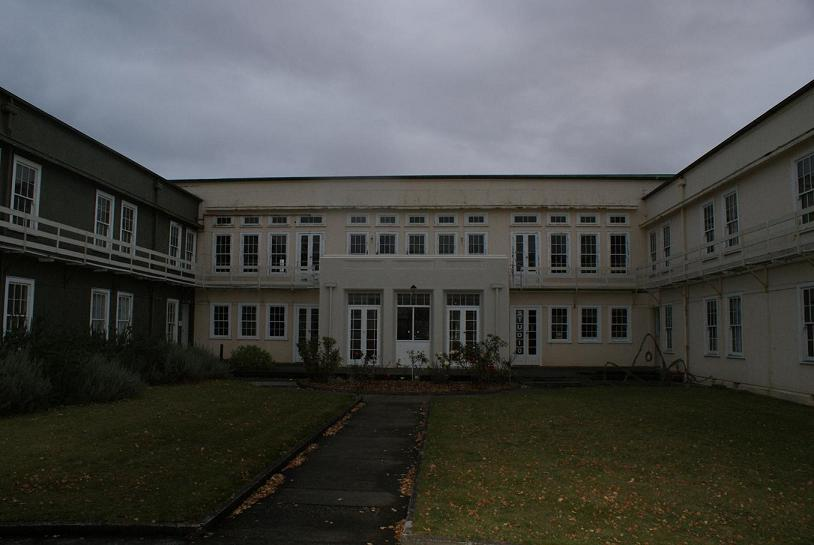

Geography
- Location: SH2 Waipukurau, Hawkes Bay, New Zealand
- Coordinates: 39°58′54″S 176°30′03″E

Organisation
- Care system: Public
- Type: Tuberculosis

Services
- Emergency department: No
- Beds: 100+

History
- Founded: 1918
- Closed: 1998

Links
- Website: Property and winery
- Lists: Hospitals in New Zealand

Pukeora Sanatorium or Pukeora Tuberculosis Sanatorium was a tuberculosis (TB) hospital in the Hawke's Bay, New Zealand.

== History ==
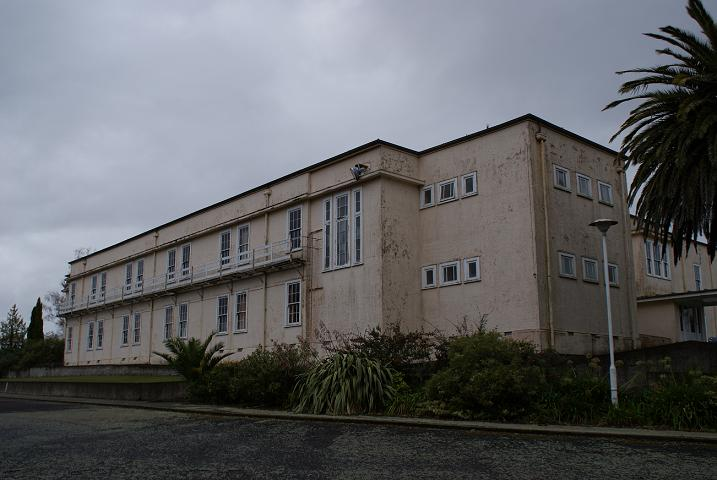
Nurses' quarters

The sanatorium was built in 1918 on the hillside site between Takapau and Waipukurau, to care for soldiers returning from World War I. A few years later the hospital started treating the general public for TB.

The cure for tuberculosis was then considered to be fresh air, which is why the property was built up on the hill. The verandahs and shacks provided easy access to this. During its 60 years or so of operation as a TB clinic, around 7000 people were treated. One notable patient in the 1950s was New Zealand novelist Noel Hilliard.

In 1957 the hospital was redeveloped as a home for the disabled and physically handicapped. It housed up to 80 residents, some who lived there for 20 years or more. In later years, as numbers of disabled residents declined, the hospital moved more into caring for head injury patients. From 1958 the hospital also offered young residents the opportunity to be involved within Scouts New Zealand. The Pukeora Scout Group had a black scarf and a yellow trim.

In 1998, the local health authority decided people with disabilities should be cared for within the community, and the hospital was closed. Shortly afterwards, the hospital was placed on the market, and sold in 2000. Today the property is used as a vineyard, winery and function center with accommodation, and the existing indoor pool still remains in use. The wine estate provides accommodation for groups of up to 120 people.

The New Zealand Ministry for Culture and Heritage gives a translation of "hill of good health" for Pukeora.
