= Nelson Marlborough District Health Board =

District health board in New Zealand

- Location of the Nelson Marlborough DHB (green) in New Zealand
- Abbreviation: NMDHB
- Formation: 1 January 2001; 25 years ago
- Founder: New Zealand Government
- Dissolved: 1 July 2022; 4 years ago
- Legal status: Dissolved
- Purpose: DHB
- Services: Health and disability services
- Parent organization: Ministry of Health
- Website: www.nmdhb.govt.nz

The Nelson Marlborough District Health Board (Nelson Marlborough DHB or NMDHB) was a district health board with the focus on providing healthcare to the Nelson, Tasman and Marlborough districts of New Zealand. In July 2022, it was merged into the national health service Te Whatu Ora (Health New Zealand).

== History ==
The Nelson Marlborough District Health Board, like most other district health boards, came into effect on 1 January 2001 established by the New Zealand Public Health and Disability Act 2000.

On 1 July 2022, the Nelson Marlborough DHB (trading as Nelson Marlborough Health) as an entity was disestablished and became part of Te Whatu Ora (Health New Zealand) and Te Aka Whai Ora (Māori Health Authority), New Zealand's new national health authorities. The Nelson Marlborough DHB's functions and responsibilities were assumed by Te Whatu Ora's Te Waipounamu division, which covers the entire South Island.

== Geographic area ==
The area covered by the Nelson Marlborough District Health Board is defined in Schedule 1 of the New Zealand Public Health and Disability Act 2000 and based on territorial authority and ward boundaries as constituted as at 1 January 2001. The area can be adjusted through an Order in Council.

== Governance ==
The initial board was fully appointed. Since the 2001 local elections, the board has been partially elected (seven members) and in addition, up to four members get appointed by the minister of health. The minister also appoints the chairperson and deputy-chair from the pool of eleven board members.

== Demographics ==
Historical population
Year	Pop.	±% p.a.
2006	130,065	—
2013	137,010	+0.75%
2018	150,612	+1.91%

Nelson Marlborough DHB served a population of 150,612 at the 2018 New Zealand census, an increase of 13,602 people (9.9%) since the 2013 census, and an increase of 20,547 people (15.8%) since the 2006 census. There were 58,041 households. There were 74,442 males and 76,167 females, giving a sex ratio of 0.98 males per female. The median age was 45.0 years (compared with 37.4 years nationally), with 26,817 people (17.8%) aged under 15 years, 23,253 (15.4%) aged 15 to 29, 69,174 (45.9%) aged 30 to 64, and 31,365 (20.8%) aged 65 or older.

Ethnicities were 89.1% European/Pākehā, 10.8% Māori, 2.3% Pacific peoples, 4.6% Asian, and 2.3% other ethnicities. People may identify with more than one ethnicity.

The percentage of people born overseas was 20.0, compared with 27.1% nationally.

Although some people objected to giving their religion, 56.1% had no religion, 32.4% were Christian, 0.6% were Hindu, 0.1% were Muslim, 0.9% were Buddhist and 2.3% had other religions.

Of those at least 15 years old, 22,503 (18.2%) people had a bachelor or higher degree, and 24,516 (19.8%) people had no formal qualifications. The median income was $29,900, compared with $31,800 nationally. 16,716 people (13.5%) earned over $70,000 compared to 17.2% nationally. The employment status of those at least 15 was that 58,902 (47.6%) people were employed full-time, 20,913 (16.9%) were part-time, and 3,195 (2.6%) were unemployed.

== Hospitals ==
=== Nelson Hospital campus ===
- Nelson Hospital (41.2871429°S 173.2692324°E) is a public hospital in Nelson South, Nelson; it has 191 beds and provides mental health, medical, surgical, maternity and children's health services. The hospital is the major trauma centre for the Nelson-Marlborough region.
- Nelson Marlborough Health Mental Health Admission Unit (41.287452°S 173.2682885°E) is a public mental health facility on the same campus, with 26 beds.
- Tipahi Street Mental Health (40.5791355°S 166.0297692°E) is a public mental health facility on the same campus, with 13 beds.

=== Blenheim hospital campus ===
- Wairau Hospital (41.5361567°S 173.941315°E) is a public hospital in Witherlea, Blenheim, Marlborough District; it has 100 beds and provides surgical, maternity, children's health and medical services.
- Churchill Private Hospital (41.536194°S 173.9433941°E) is a private hospital next to Wairau Hospital; it has nine beds and provides surgical services.
- Hospice Marlborough (41.5354249°S 173.9436298°E) is a private hospital also next to Wairau Hospital; it has six beds and provides medical services.

=== Other public hospitals ===
- Alexandra Hospital (41.340722°S 137.3406114°E) in Richmond, Tasman District has 12 beds and provides psychogeriatric services.
- Murchison Hospital and Health Centre (41.8058995°S 172.3260231°E) in Murchison, Tasman District has eight beds and provides medical services and rest home care.
- Motueka Maternity Unit (41.129544°S 173.008036°E) in Motueka, Tasman District has five beds and provides maternity services.

=== Other private hospitals ===
- Manuka Street Hospital (41.2787454°S 173.2881433°E) in Nelson Central, Nelson has 22 beds and provides surgical services.
- Nelson Tasman Hospice (41.3242538°S 173.2273632°E) in Stoke, Nelson has 10 beds and provides medical services.
