= MidCentral District Health Board =

Former district health board in New Zealand

- Te Pae Hauora o Ruahine o Tararua
- Location of the MidCentral DHB (green) in New Zealand
- Formation: 1 January 2001; 25 years ago
- Dissolved: 1 July 2022; 4 years ago
- Purpose: District health board
- Headquarters: Palmerston North, New Zealand
- Chief Executive: Kathryn Cook
- Website: www.midcentraldhb.govt.nz

MidCentral District Health Board (MidCentral DHB or MCDHB) was a district health board that provided healthcare in the Manawatū region of New Zealand. The DHB covers the Manawatū District, Palmerston North City, Tararua District, Horowhenua District, and the Ōtaki ward of the Kāpiti Coast District. In July 2022, the MidCentral DHB was merged into the national health service Te Whatu Ora.

== History ==
The MidCentral District Health Board, like most other district health boards, came into effect on 1 January 2001 established by the New Zealand Public Health and Disability Act 2000.

On 1 July 2022, the MidCentral DHB and the other district health boards were disestablished, with Te Whatu Ora (Health New Zealand) assuming their former functions and operations including hospitals and health services. The MidCentral DHB was brought under Te Whatu Ora's Central division.

== Geographic area ==
The area covered by the MidCentral District Health Board is defined in Schedule 1 of the New Zealand Public Health and Disability Act 2000 and based on territorial authority and ward boundaries as constituted as at 1 January 2001. The area can be adjusted through an Order in Council.

== Facilities ==
Palmerston North Hospital is the DHB's main hospital, and serves as the major trauma centre for the DHB area.

== Governance ==
The initial board was fully appointed. Since the 2001 local elections, the board has been partially elected (seven members) and in addition, up to four members get appointed by the Minister of Health. The minister also appoints the chairperson and deputy-chair from the pool of eleven board members.

The current board was sworn in on 9 December 2019, following the 2019 local elections. Brendan Duffy, a former mayor of the Horowhenua District, chairs the board.

Member(s)	Type
Brendan Duffy	Appointed
Norman Gray	Appointed
Materoa Mar	Appointed
Oriana Paewai	Appointed
Heather Browning	Elected
Vaughan Dennison	Elected
Lew Findlay	Elected
Muriel Hancock	Elected
Karen Naylor	Elected
John Waldon	Elected
Jenny Warren	Elected

== Demographics ==
Historical population
Year	Pop.	±% p.a.
2006	158,841	—
2013	162,564	+0.33%
2018	174,993	+1.48%

MidCentral DHB served a population of 174,993 at the 2018 New Zealand census, an increase of 12,429 people (7.6%) since the 2013 census, and an increase of 16,152 people (10.2%) since the 2006 census. There were 65,580 households. There were 85,575 males and 89,415 females, giving a sex ratio of 0.96 males per female. The median age was 38.8 years (compared with 37.4 years nationally), with 34,602 people (19.8%) aged under 15 years, 35,463 (20.3%) aged 15 to 29, 73,803 (42.2%) aged 30 to 64, and 31,122 (17.8%) aged 65 or older.

Ethnicities were 80.1% European/Pākehā, 20.6% Māori, 4.4% Pacific peoples, 7.5% Asian, and 2.4% other ethnicities. People may identify with more than one ethnicity.

The percentage of people born overseas was 16.0, compared with 27.1% nationally.

Although some people objected to giving their religion, 50.5% had no religion, 35.9% were Christian, 1.1% were Hindu, 0.8% were Muslim, 0.7% were Buddhist and 3.2% had other religions.

Of those at least 15 years old, 24,855 (17.7%) people had a bachelor or higher degree, and 30,177 (21.5%) people had no formal qualifications. The median income was $28,200, compared with $31,800 nationally. 18,015 people (12.8%) earned over $70,000 compared to 17.2% nationally. The employment status of those at least 15 was that 65,634 (46.8%) people were employed full-time, 20,370 (14.5%) were part-time, and 6,120 (4.4%) were unemployed.

== Hospitals ==
=== Public hospitals ===
- Palmerston North Hospital (40.3382811°S 175.6168614°E) in Roslyn, Palmerston North has 354 beds and provides mental health, children's health, maternity, surgical, psychogeriatric, medical and geriatric services.
- Horowhenua Health Centre (40.6326466°S 175.2842619°E) in Levin, Horowhenua has 28 beds and provides geriatric, maternity and medical services.

=== Private hospitals ===
- Crest Hospital (40.3491272°S 175.6094462°E) in Papaioea, Palmerston North has 30 beds and provides surgical and medical services.
- Te Papaioea Birthing Centre (40.3412898°S 175.6214284°E) in Roslyn, Palmerston North has 12 beds and provides maternity services.
- Dannevirke Community Hospital (40.2119189°S 176.0959932°E) in Dannevirke, Tararua has 11 beds and provides maternity and medical services.
- Arohanui Hospice (40.4898051°S 175.1043257°E) in Roslyn, Palmerston North has 11 beds and provides medical services.
