= Hamilton Lake (suburb) =

Suburb of Hamilton, New Zealand

- Suburb
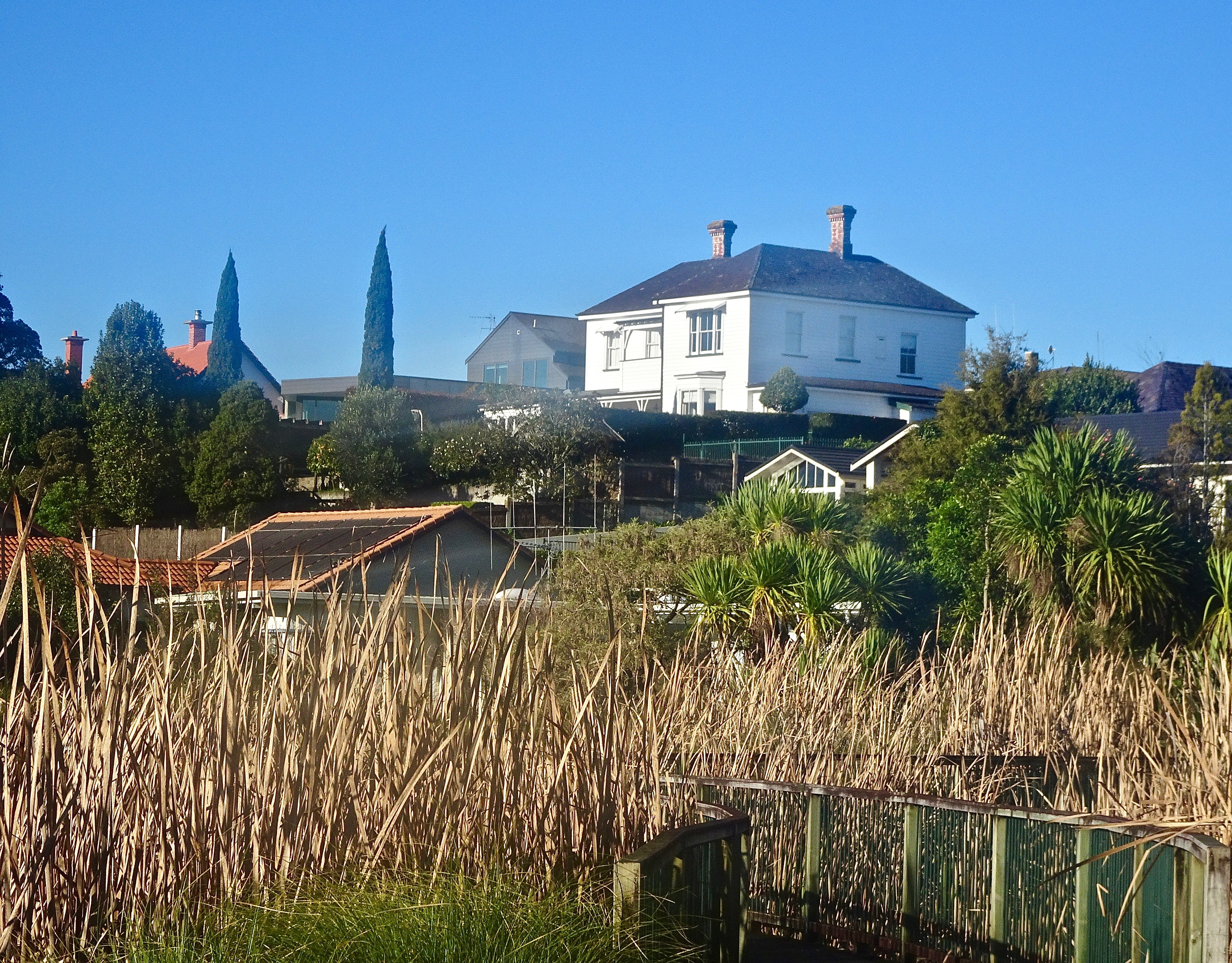
- Lake House
- Interactive map of Hamilton Lake
- Coordinates: 37.804°S 175.277°E
- Country: New Zealand
- City: Hamilton, New Zealand
- Local authority: Hamilton City Council
- Electoral ward: West Ward

Area
  - Land: 244 ha (600 acres)

Population (June 2025)
  - Total: 5,070
  - Density: 2,080/km^{2} (5,380/sq mi)

Maeroa	Hamilton North	Hamilton Central
Frankton	Hamilton Lake	Hamilton West
	Deanwell	Melville

Hamilton Lake is a residential suburb of Hamilton, surrounding Lake Rotoroa and the Hamilton Lake Domain. Domain Drive was rebuilt in 1940 and most of the housing in the suburb near the lake had been built by 1943, but development of the area to the south west only began in the 1970s and was continuing in 1995. The roads close to the lake are considered to be amongst Hamilton's premium streets.

== Demographics ==
Hamilton Lake covers 2.44 km^{2} (0.94 sq mi) and had an estimated population of 5,070 as of June 2025, with a population density of 2,078 people per km^{2}.

Historical population
Year	Pop.	±% p.a.
2006	3,054	—
2013	3,843	+3.34%
2018	4,140	+1.50%
2023	4,623	+2.23%
The 2006 population is for a smaller area of 1.86 km^{2}. Source:

Hamilton Lake had a population of 4,623 in the 2023 New Zealand census, an increase of 483 people (11.7%) since the 2018 census, and an increase of 780 people (20.3%) since the 2013 census. There were 2,274 males, 2,313 females and 36 people of other genders in 1,734 dwellings. 5.0% of people identified as LGBTIQ+. The median age was 34.8 years (compared with 38.1 years nationally). There were 681 people (14.7%) aged under 15 years, 1,185 (25.6%) aged 15 to 29, 2,142 (46.3%) aged 30 to 64, and 615 (13.3%) aged 65 or older.

People could identify as more than one ethnicity. The results were 59.4% European (Pākehā); 21.7% Māori; 6.0% Pasifika; 24.6% Asian; 2.8% Middle Eastern, Latin American and African New Zealanders (MELAA); and 2.6% other, which includes people giving their ethnicity as "New Zealander". English was spoken by 95.3%, Māori language by 5.1%, Samoan by 0.8%, and other languages by 20.6%. No language could be spoken by 2.4% (e.g. too young to talk). New Zealand Sign Language was known by 0.7%. The percentage of people born overseas was 33.1, compared with 28.8% nationally.

Religious affiliations were 34.7% Christian, 5.0% Hindu, 1.6% Islam, 1.1% Māori religious beliefs, 1.0% Buddhist, 0.5% New Age, 0.1% Jewish, and 4.0% other religions. People who answered that they had no religion were 46.2%, and 6.2% of people did not answer the census question.

Of those at least 15 years old, 1,362 (34.6%) people had a bachelor's or higher degree, 1,815 (46.0%) had a post-high school certificate or diploma, and 768 (19.5%) people exclusively held high school qualifications. The median income was $47,900, compared with $41,500 nationally. 525 people (13.3%) earned over $100,000 compared to 12.1% nationally. The employment status of those at least 15 was that 2,151 (54.6%) people were employed full-time, 447 (11.3%) were part-time, and 132 (3.3%) were unemployed.

Individual statistical areas
Name	Area (km^{2})	Population	Density (per km^{2})	Dwellings	Median age	Median income
Hamilton Lake North	0.98	2,475	2,526	984	33.1 years	$45,800
Hamilton Lake South	1.47	2,148	1,461	747	36.8 years	$50,600
New Zealand					38.1 years	$41,500

== Education ==
Hamilton Girls' High School is a single-sex state secondary school for years 9 to 13 with a roll of 1768 as of July 2025. It was founded in 1911 as Hamilton High School, and become single-sex in 1955 when Hamilton Boys' High School was created.

== Parks ==
Hamilton Lake Domain is a 101 hectares (250 acres) park on the east side of the lake. It has a large playground and a cafe.

Innes Common is a sportground on the west side of the lake, primarily used for cricket, hockey and football. It also has a playground.

== Notable buildings ==
- Lake House, 102 Lake Crescent, the homestead of the Rukuhia Estate, designed and built in 1873 by Isaac Richardson Vialou, Hamilton's first architect and mayor..
- Jolly House (Chateau Windemere), 39 Queen's Avenue, a residence built from 1910.
- Water Tower, 18 Ruakiwi Road, a utility building constructed from 1930.

== See also ==
- List of streets in Hamilton
