= West Coast District Health Board =

District health board of New Zealand

- Location of the West Coast DHB (green) in New Zealand
- Abbreviation: WCDHB
- Formation: 1 January 2001; 25 years ago
- Founder: New Zealand Government
- Dissolved: 1 July 2022; 4 years ago
- Legal status: Active
- Purpose: DHB
- Services: Health and disability services
- Parent organization: Ministry of Health
- Website: www.wcdhb.health.nz

The West Coast District Health Board (West Coast DHB or WCDHB) was a district health board with the focus on providing healthcare to the West Coast region of New Zealand. In July 2022, the West Coast DHB's functions and responsibilities were taken over by the national health service Te Whatu Ora (Health New Zealand).

== History ==
The West Coast District Health Board, like most other district health boards, came into effect on 1 January 2001 established by the New Zealand Public Health and Disability Act 2000.

On 1 July 2022, the West Coast DHB's hospitals and health services were taken over by the national health service Te Whatu Ora (Health New Zealand) as part of an overhaul of the district health board system. The West Coast DHB's former jurisdiction was taken over by Te Whatu Ora's Te Waipounamu division.

== Geographic area ==
The area covered by the West Coast District Health Board was defined in Schedule 1 of the New Zealand Public Health and Disability Act 2000 and based on territorial authority and ward boundaries as constituted as at 1 January 2001. The area could have been adjusted through an Order in Council.

== Governance ==
The initial board was fully appointed. Since the 2001 local elections, the board had been partially elected (seven members) and in addition, up to four members get appointed by the Minister of Health. The minister also appoints the chairperson and deputy-chair from the pool of eleven board members.

== Demographics ==
The area served by the West Coast DHB is the same as the West Coast region.

== Hospitals ==
=== Public hospitals ===
- Grey Base Hospital (42.4636512°S 171.1899531°E) in Greymouth, Grey District has 120 beds and provides maternity, surgical, dementia care, medical, geriatric, mental health and children's health services.
- Buller Health (41.7488081°S 171.6038604°E) in Westport, Buller District has eight beds and provides maternity and medical services.
