= Whakatāne Hospital =

- Bay of Plenty District Health Board

Geography
- Location: Bay of Plenty, New Zealand
- Coordinates: 37.964658°S 176.977466°E

Organisation
- Type: General

Services
- Emergency department: Yes
- Beds: 96

Helipads
- Helipad: ICAO: NZJF

Links
- Website: Whakatāne Hospital
- Lists: Hospitals in New Zealand

Whakatāne Hospital is a hospital in New Zealand, serving the town of Whakatāne, and the Eastern Bay of Plenty. It is operated and managed by the Bay of Plenty District Health Board.

== History ==
Plans for a purpose-built hospital for the Whakatāne District on Stewart Street were drawn up in 1919 and 1920, and construction of the Whakatane District Hospital started in 1921. The Anglican Māori Mission Hospital on Bridge Street served as a temporary hospital until the district hospital was opened on 13 September 1923. The original complex included wards for men, women and children, an operating theatre, a pharmacy, and an X-ray facility. A laboratory and facilities for ear, nose & throat specialists were opened in 1927. Subsequent buildings included the Dawson Block (opened 1963) and the five-storey Godfrey Santon Block (opened 1974), the latter housing the Emergency Department.

=== Project Waka Redevelopment ===
A $64 million redevelopment of the Whakatāne Hospital complex is currently underway. The project includes refurbishment of some of the existing buildings and the construction of a new hospital building. Planned works include the relocation of the helipad, refurbishing the current Outpatient Department facility, the relocation of the Mental Health Unit, the construction of a Maori Health Unit, the relocation of the conference centre and the demolition of several buildings. The new building will house the Emergency Department (15 cubicles, 2 resuscitation bays), In-patient beds (69 medical and surgical, 10 paediatric), an Acute Patients Unit, Coronary Care Unit, High Dependency Unit, Radiology Theatres and Treatment and Rehabilitation Assessment (9 beds, 2 operating rooms, 1 procedure room). The project also has plans for a central courtyard with gardens, a cafe and a children's playground.

== Facilities/departments ==
The hospital includes the following facilities, and departments:

- Emergency Dept
- Maternity Ward
- Clinical School
- Mental Health
- Maori Health
- 'Project Hope' Cancer Centre
- Physio/Rehabilitation Center

The hospital also has a helipad (ICAO: NZJF).

== Services ==
The hospital provides medical, surgical, paediatrics, obstetrics, gynaecology and mental health services. The hospital is home to a range of associated clinical support services and allied health as well, including rehabilitation, speech therapy, physiotherapy, stroke and cardiac support, district nursing and drug and alcohol programmes.
