= South Canterbury District Health Board =

District health board of New Zealand

- Location of the South Canterbury DHB (green) in New Zealand
- Abbreviation: SCDHB
- Formation: 1 January 2001; 25 years ago
- Founder: New Zealand Government
- Dissolved: 1 July 2022; 4 years ago
- Legal status: Active
- Purpose: DHB
- Services: Health and disability services
- Parent organization: Ministry of Health
- Website: www.scdhb.health.nz

The South Canterbury District Health Board (South Canterbury DHB or SCDHB) was a district health board with the focus on providing healthcare to the Timaru, Mackenzie, Waimate districts in New Zealand. In July 2022, it was merged into the national health service Te Whatu Ora (Health New Zealand).

== History ==
The South Canterbury District Health Board, like most other district health boards (DHBs), came into effect on 1 January 2001 established by the New Zealand Public Health and Disability Act 2000.

On 1 July 2022, the South Canterbury DHB was merged into Te Whatu Ora (Health New Zealand) as part of a national overhaul of the DHB system. The former South Canterbury DHB's functions and operations were assumed by Te Whatu Ora Te Waipounamu, which covers the entire South Island.

== Geographic area ==
The area covered by the South Canterbury District Health Board is defined in Schedule 1 of the New Zealand Public Health and Disability Act 2000 and based on territorial authority and ward boundaries as constituted as at 1 January 2001. The area can be adjusted through an Order in Council.

SCDHB serves around 59,000 people. South Canterbury DHB employs between 950 and 1000 staff at any given time, including part-timers, casuals and contractors.

== Demographics ==
Historical population
Year	Pop.	±% p.a.
2006	53,880	—
2013	55,623	+0.46%
2018	58,977	+1.18%

South Canterbury DHB served a population of 58,977 at the 2018 New Zealand census, an increase of 3,354 people (6.0%) since the 2013 census, and an increase of 5,097 people (9.5%) since the 2006 census. There were 24,270 households. There were 29,289 males and 29,685 females, giving a sex ratio of 0.99 males per female. The median age was 44.7 years (compared with 37.4 years nationally), with 10,446 people (17.7%) aged under 15 years, 9,723 (16.5%) aged 15 to 29, 26,097 (44.2%) aged 30 to 64, and 12,705 (21.5%) aged 65 or older.

Ethnicities were 90.1% European/Pākehā, 8.7% Māori, 1.7% Pacific peoples, 4.8% Asian, and 2.0% other ethnicities. People may identify with more than one ethnicity.

The percentage of people born overseas was 14.5, compared with 27.1% nationally.

Although some people objected to giving their religion, 48.8% had no religion, 40.1% were Christian, 0.7% were Hindu, 0.2% were Muslim, 0.4% were Buddhist and 1.7% had other religions.

Of those at least 15 years old, 6,399 (13.2%) people had a bachelor or higher degree, and 12,048 (24.8%) people had no formal qualifications. The median income was $30,100, compared with $31,800 nationally. 6,696 people (13.8%) earned over $70,000 compared to 17.2% nationally. The employment status of those at least 15 was that 23,988 (49.4%) people were employed full-time, 7,374 (15.2%) were part-time, and 1,158 (2.4%) were unemployed.

- South Canterbury’s population tends to be much older than the national average.
- South Canterbury has low proportion of Māori and Pacific people living there compared to the national average.
- South Canterbury has a low proportion of people in the most deprived section of the population when compared to the national average.

== Facilities ==
- Timaru Hospital
- Kensington Centre (Mental Health Services)

South Canterbury District Health Board also operates the South Canterbury District Primary Care Provider, that provides primary health services to the region.

== Governance ==
The initial board was fully appointed. Since the 2001 local elections, the board has been partially elected (seven members) and in addition, up to four members get appointed by the Minister of Health. The minister also appoints the chairperson and deputy-chair from the pool of eleven board members.

== Hospitals ==
=== Public hospitals ===
- Timaru Hospital (44.408356°S 171.256527°E) in Parkside, Timaru has 132 beds and provides medical, mental health, children's health, maternity and surgical services.

=== Private hospitals ===
- Bidwill Trust Hospital (44.3947239°S 171.2426743°E) in Seaview, Timaru has 14 beds and provides surgical services.
- Hospice South Canterbury (44.3858144°S 171.2157235°E) in Highfield, Timaru has 7 beds and provides medical services.
