= Office of the Waikato District Hospital and Charitable Aid Board (Former) =

Coordinates: 37.790356°S 175.285208°E

The Office of the Waikato District Hospital and Charitable Aid Board (Former) is a historic building at 17 Hood Street, in the CBD of Hamilton and was in 2008 listed as Category 2 by Heritage New Zealand.

== Early years ==
The building was designed by Auckland architect Thomas Mahoney and built by John P. Murray in 1903. Both the Board (established 1886) and the building were parts of an effort on the part of Hamiltonians and the broader Waikato to separate themselves from their more populous northern province, Auckland. The false-fronted single storey office building of brick and concrete, in Stripped Classical design, has a decorative pressed metal ceiling in the board room.

After a fire in 1911, the building was restored under architect John Willing Warren.

After the founding of the Hospital Board, healthcare care grew quickly as a significant local industry, and the nearby Waikato Hospital on Waiora (about 2 km south of the historic building) As of 2011 is currently Australasia's largest hospital campus site.

== 1930s to present ==
The Waikato Hospital Board grew too large for the building and moved out in 1935, with the building passing into commercial use. James Treloar sold milking machine equipment to the local farming community from the site for about two decades. Hamilton Lighthouse and Wilsons Sports Centre were also tenants during this period.

In 1994 the building was restored and facilities were added to the rear under the supervision of architects Vaughn Priddy and Murray Price. Since then the building has been used as Diggers Bar and Café. In November 2008 the building was listed as Category 2 by Heritage New Zealand. According to a 2011 Waikato Times article, it is claimed to be a haunted location.
