= Hawke's Bay District Health Board =

District health board of New Zealand

- Location of the Hawke's Bay DHB (green) in New Zealand
- Abbreviation: HBDHB
- Formation: 1 January 2001; 25 years ago
- Founder: New Zealand Government
- Dissolved: 1 July 2022; 4 years ago
- Legal status: Active
- Purpose: DHB
- Services: Health and disability services
- Parent organization: Ministry of Health
- Website: hawkesbay.health.nz

The Hawke's Bay District Health Board (Hawke's Bay DHB or HBDHB) was a district health board with the focus on providing healthcare to Hawke's Bay, New Zealand. In July 2022, it was merged into the national health service Te Whatu Ora (Health New Zealand).

== History ==
The Hawke's Bay District Health Board, like most other district health boards, came into effect on 1 January 2001, established by the New Zealand Public Health and Disability Act 2000.

== Geographic area ==
The area covered by the board is defined in Schedule 1 of the New Zealand Public Health and Disability Act 2000 and based on territorial authority and ward boundaries as constituted as of 1 January 2001. The area was initially Wairoa District, Hastings District, Napier City, Central Hawke's Bay District and Chatham Islands Territory. The area can be adjusted through an Order in Council, which happened on 30 June 2015, by clause 3 of the Health and Disability (Geographical Areas of DHBs) Order 2015, when Chatham Islands Territory was transferred to Canterbury District Health Board.

On 1 July 2022, all district health boards including the Hawke's Bay DHB were merged into the national health service Te Whatu Ora (Health New Zealand). The Hawke's Bay DHB's functions and operations were taken over by Te Whatu Ora's Central division.

== Governance ==
The initial board was fully appointed. Since the 2001 local elections, the board has been partially elected (seven members) and in addition, up to four members are appointed by the Minister of Health. The minister also appoints the chairperson and deputy-chair from the pool of eleven board members. The Board was replaced by a Commissioner, Sir John Anderson, during 2008 after criticising the government.

== Demographics ==
Historical population
Year	Pop.	±% p.a.
2006	147,639	—
2013	151,092	+0.33%
2018	166,287	+1.94%

Hawke's Bay DHB served a population of 166,287 at the 2018 New Zealand census, an increase of 15,195 people (10.1%) since the 2013 census, and an increase of 18,648 people (12.6%) since the 2006 census. There were 60,204 households. There were 81,003 males and 85,284 females, giving a sex ratio of 0.95 males per female. The median age was 40.6 years (compared with 37.4 years nationally), with 34,926 people (21.0%) aged under 15 years, 29,175 (17.5%) aged 15 to 29, 71,799 (43.2%) aged 30 to 64, and 30,384 (18.3%) aged 65 or older.

Ethnicities were 75.0% European/Pākehā, 27.0% Māori, 5.6% Pacific peoples, 5.0% Asian, and 1.7% other ethnicities. People may identify with more than one ethnicity.

The percentage of people born overseas was 15.9, compared with 27.1% nationally.

Although some people objected to giving their religion, 48.5% had no religion, 37.4% were Christian, 0.7% were Hindu, 0.4% were Muslim, 0.6% were Buddhist and 5.5% had other religions.

Of those at least 15 years old, 21,408 (16.3%) people had a bachelor or higher degree, and 27,621 (21.0%) people had no formal qualifications. The median income was $28,300, compared with $31,800 nationally. 16,473 people (12.5%) earned over $70,000 compared to 17.2% nationally. The employment status of those at least 15 was that 63,951 (48.7%) people were employed full-time, 19,596 (14.9%) were part-time, and 4,710 (3.6%) were unemployed.

== Hospitals ==
=== Public hospitals ===
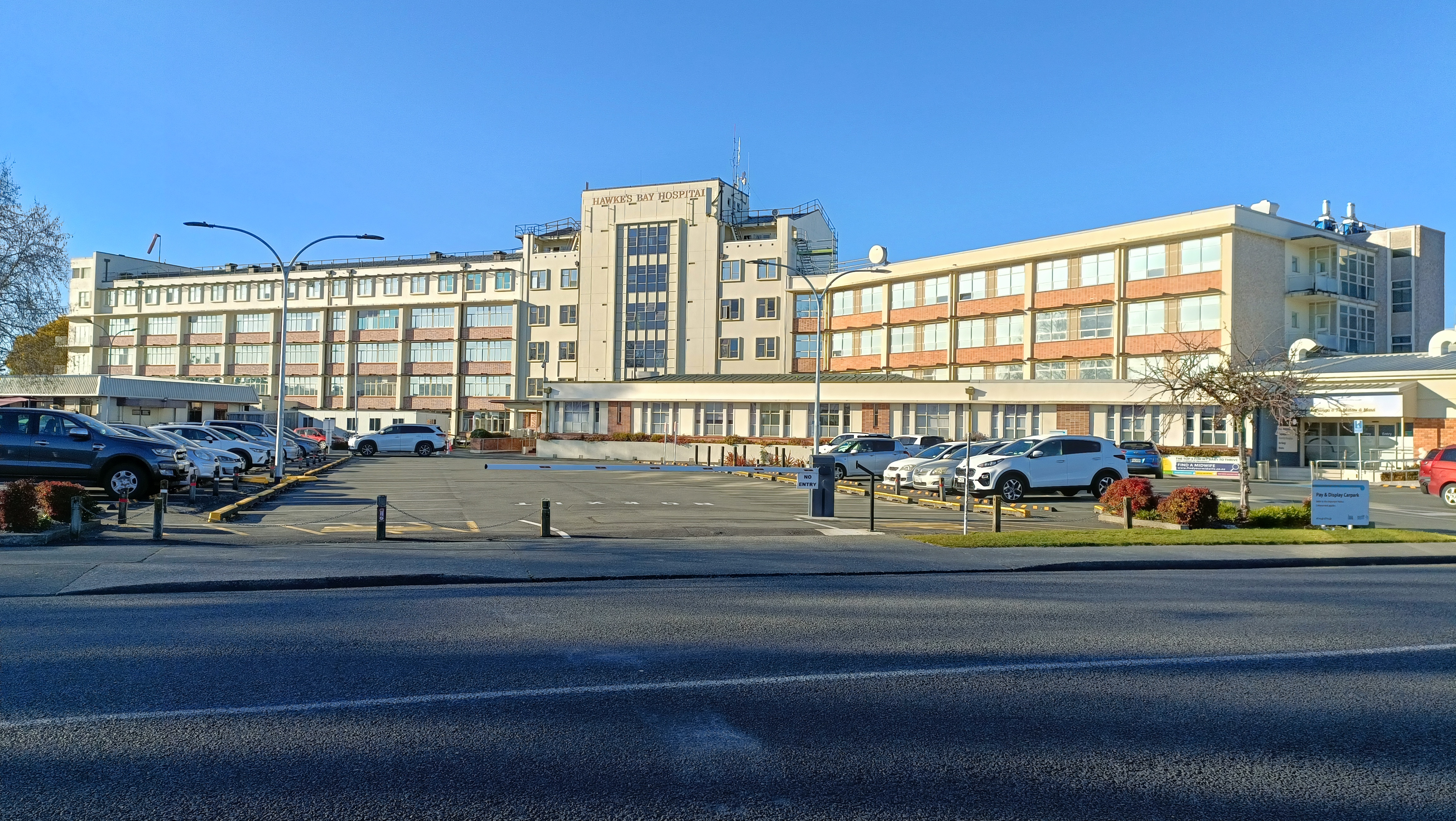
Hawke's Bay Hospital

- Hawke's Bay Hospital (39.6286706°S 176.8233744°E) in Camberley, Hastings, has 364 beds and provides medical, mental health, children's health, maternity and surgical services.
- Wairoa Hospital & Health Centre (39.0415211°S 177.4124237°E) in Wairoa has 12 beds and provides maternity and medical services.
- Central Hawkes Bay Health Centre (40.033003°S 175.9701568°E) in Waipukurau, Central Hawke's Bay, has eight beds and provides medical services.

=== Private hospitals ===
- Royston Hospital (39.6413644°S 176.8328669°E) in Raureka, Hastings, has 33 beds and provides surgical and medical services.
- Cranford Hospice (39.7433157°S 176.4558465°E) in Raureka, Hastings, has eight beds and provides medical services.
