= Braemar Hospital =

Coordinates: 37°48′28.14″S 175°16′45.83″E

Braemar Hospital Limited
- Braemar Charitable Trust

Geography
- Location: Hamilton, Waikato, New Zealand

Organisation
- Care system: Private
- Affiliated university: None

Services
- Emergency department: no
- Beds: 85

History
- Opened: 1924

Links
- Website: https://www.braemarhospital.co.nz/
- Lists: Hospitals in New Zealand

Braemar Hospital is one of the New Zealand's largest private hospitals. It is owned by the Braemar Charitable Trust located in Hamilton, New Zealand. There was a separate and unrelated organisation, Braemar Hospital in Nelson, New Zealand which provided long term psychiatric care for children.

It was founded in 1926 and moved from Lake Road in 2009.

The hospital is located on Ohaupo Road, Melville. It carries out 10,000 surgical and medical procedures a year. It started a bowel-cancer screening service in 2014. In 2015 it had 85 beds, eight theatres and two endoscopy units. It was the first private hospital in New Zealand to offer endoscopic ultrasound and the first hospital in Australasia to install ultra high-definition imaging tools in the operating theatres, which enabled it to expand the range of keyhole surgery.

It says that the fees charged "are very reasonable and any surplus we make goes back into the hospital or the charitable activities that we do, like supplying free surgery and supporting doctors and nurses with ongoing education."

Hamilton City Council's proposed long-term plan would involve raising its rates by $355,400, compounded by a proposed transition from a land value to capital value rating system which chief executive Paul Bennett says would cause considerable problems. The hospital's annual rates bill was $52,550 in 2014/15.

It initiated a $20 million expansion plan in 2015, driven by the demand for orthopaedic surgery from the aging population.

== Facilities ==
The hospital provides 85 beds in both its hospitals.
