= District health board =

Defunct health provider in New Zealand

Map showing district health board boundaries since 2010

District health boards (DHBs) in New Zealand were organisations established by the New Zealand Public Health and Disability Act 2000 under the Fifth Labour Government, responsible for ensuring the provision of health and disability services to populations within a defined geographical area. They existed from 1 January 2001, when the act came into force, to 30 June 2022. Initially there were 21 DHBs, and this was reduced to 20 organisations in 2010: fifteen in the North Island and five in the South Island. DHBs received public funding from the Ministry of Health on behalf of the Crown, based on a formula that took into account the total number, gender, age, socio-economic status and ethnic mix of their population. DHBs were governed by boards, which were partially elected (as part of the triennial local elections) and partially appointed by the minister of Health.

In April 2021, the Sixth Labour government announced that the system of district health boards was to be abolished and replaced by a single agency to be called Te Whatu Ora (Health New Zealand). In addition, a new Te Aka Whai Ora (Māori Health Authority) was to be set up to regulate and provide health services to the Māori community.

== History ==
=== Predecessors ===
The district health board (DHB) system had three predecessors: the Area Health Boards (1983–1989), the Regional Health Authorities and Crown Health Enterprises (1993–1997), and the Health Funding Authority (HFA) and Hospital and Health Services (1998–2001). In 1938, the First Labour Government introduced the Social Security Act 1938 with the goal of creating a free public health system in New Zealand. Due to disagreements between the Government and medical professionals, this vision was not realised. In 1941, the Government and medical providers concluded a series of arrangements known as the General Medical Service (GMS) benefits, which established a dual system of public and private healthcare services which would remain in place until 1983.

During the 1970s, growing dissatisfaction with the quality and accessibility of the healthcare system led the Third Labour Government to issue a white paper called A health service for New Zealand, which proposed a large-scale reform of the healthcare system. Labour subsequently lost the election to Robert Muldoon's National Party in the 1975 election. The Special Advisory Committee on Health Services Organisation (SACHSO) advocated establishing 14 "Area Health Boards" (AHBs), which combined the curative functions of the Hospital Boards with the preventative functions of the Department of Health's district health offices. The Third National Government piloted a trial AHB health scheme in the Wellington and Northland regions. Due to the success of the pilot scheme, the Government passed legislation establishing Area Health Boards in 1983.

Following the 1984 election, the incoming Fourth Labour Government expanded the Area Health Board system. Between 1985 and 1989, the 27 existing hospital boards were restructured as AHBs. These entities were led by board members who were elected for three year terms concurrent with the local council bodies.

In 1991, the incoming Fourth National Government introduced legislation replacing the AHB board members with Government-appointed commissioners. These changes were part of a Government "green and white paper" entitled Your Health and Public Health which proposed privatising public healthcare services in New Zealand. In 1993, the Area Health Boards were replaced by 23 Crown Health Enterprises (CHEs), which operated as state-owned enterprises and were responsible for providing health services. In addition, the Government established four Regional Health Authorities (RHAs) with purchasing responsibilities. The purchaser/provider split was meant to ensure that public hospitals did not have privileged access to purchasing resources over private hospitals.

Following the 1996 election, the governing National Party and its New Zealand First coalition partner merged the RHAs in 1997 into a national purchasing agency, the Health Funding Authority. Under the Health and Disability Services Amendment Act 1998, the Crown Health Enterprises were revamped as Hospital and Health Services (HHS). As part of the coalition governing arrangement, there was more emphasis on collaboration between health purchasers and providers while the HHS were reoriented to be less commercially focused with greater community input on hospital boards.

=== Formation ===
Following the 1999 election, the incoming Labour-Alliance coalition government launched an extensive revamp of New Zealand's healthcare system as part its of health election pledge. Under the New Zealand Public Health and Disability Act 2000, the Labour-led Government replaced the Hospital and Health Services system with 21 district health boards, which came into force in 2001. These DHBs operated as subsidiary organisations of the Health Ministry and were responsible for providing and funding health services within a defined geographical area.

Funding for the DHBs was allocated based on the Health Ministry's population-based funding formula. In addition, the HFA was disestablished and its health funding functions were transferred to the Health Ministry.

On 1 May 2010, the Otago and Southland DHBs were amalgamated by the Fifth National Government to form the new Southern District Health Board; reducing the number of DHBs to 20.

=== Dissolution ===
On 21 April 2021, Minister of Health Andrew Little announced that DHBs would be abolished and replaced by a public health agency to be called Te Whatu Ora (Health New Zealand), which was modelled after the British National Health Service. In addition, a new Te Aka Whai Ora (Māori Health Authority) was established to set up policies for Māori health and to decide and fund those who will deliver services. A Public Health Authority was also established to centralise public health work. The transition will occur over a three-year period with an interim Health New Zealand organisation being set up in late 2021. Legislation establishing the new organisation is expected to occur in mid-2022. The second phase from late 2022 will be the expansion and development over a two-to-three year period.

Epidemiologist Michael Baker described the establishment of the district health board system as driven by neoliberalism and characterised it as an "absurd system". He welcomed the abolition of DHBs.

In October 2021, the Sixth Labour Government introduced the Pae Ora (Healthy Futures) Bill to replace the country's district health boards with the new Te Whatu Ora. The legislation would also establish the Te Aka Whai Ora and a new Public Health Agency while strengthening the Ministry of Health's stewardship role. The bill passed its third reading on 7 June 2022.

On 1 July 2022, the district health boards were formally disestablished, with Health New Zealand assuming control of all hospitals and health services. The DHB system's functions and operations were assumed by Te Whatu Ora, Te Aka Whai Ora, and the Health Ministry. In addition, Te Whatu Ora established four new regional divisions to manage health services in the former 20 district health boards:

- Northern: Northland, Waitematā, Auckland and Counties Manukau
- Te Manawa Taki: Waikato, Lakes, Bay of Plenty, Tairāwhiti, Taranaki
- Central: MidCentral, Whanganui, Capital & Coast/Hutt Valley, Hawke's Bay, Wairarapa
- Te Waipounamu: Canterbury/West Coast, Nelson Marlborough, Southern, South Canterbury.

== Organisation ==
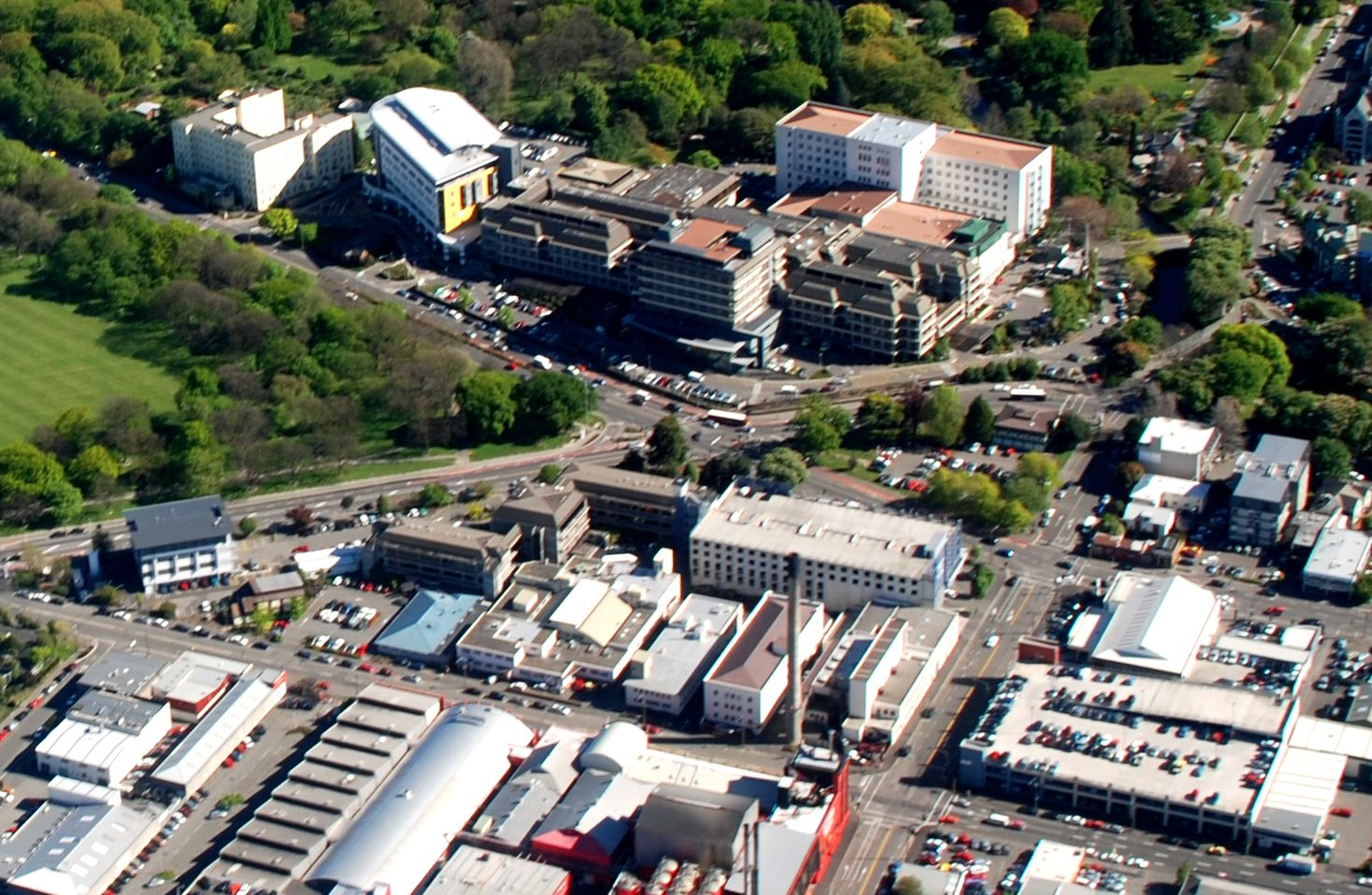
The DHBs operate healthcare facilities. The Canterbury DHB operates Christchurch Hospital (pictured).

The Ministry of Health gives district health boards a set of objectives; they have a degree of autonomy in how they choose to achieve these. In contrast to their predecessors, the regional health authorities, the DHBs are non-profit providers. The DHB Funding and Performance Directorate of the Ministry of Health monitors the performance of individual DHBs. DHBs provided funding to primary health organisations (PHOs).

DHB activities were governed by boards, which consisted of up to eleven members: seven elected by the public every three years, and up to four appointed by the Government's Minister of Health. From 1 January 2001 the boards comprised appointed members only. The first elected members were chosen in the 2001 local-body elections held on 13 October using the first-past-the-post voting system (FPP). Since the 2004 local-body elections, the single transferable vote (STV, a proportional voting system) has been used. The use of appointed Board members aims to balance the boards' expertise as deemed necessary. As part of the appointment process, the Minister of Health appoints a chairperson and a deputy-chair; either from the appointed members or from elected members.

Voting for public-elected DHB board members occurred at the same time as local-body elections. Local-body elections take every three years on the second Saturday in October. As defined in the legislation, elected and appointed (if they get appointed in time) members started their term 58 days after the election (i.e. in early December) and the term of the previous board finished that day.

Health Boards were replaced by unelected commissioners in Hawke's Bay in 2009, Southern in 2015 and Waikato in 2019. The basis on which ministers have made such decisions have been questioned.

Taranaki and Wairarapa District Health Boards maintained their own ambulance services, with St John and the Wellington Free Ambulance covering the rest of the country.

On 1 May 2010 the Otago DHB and the Southland DHB merged to form a new Southern DHB, with elected members coming from two constituencies – Otago and Southland – and the remainder appointed by the Ministry of Health, with the change taking effect from the 2010 local-body elections. From 1 July 2010, a unified primary health organisation has covered the entire new Southern DHB region, with PHO centres in Alexandra, Dunedin and Invercargill with the mandate of providing PHO resources and services, replacing the previous nine PHOs.

== Locations ==
There were 20 DHBs, organised around geographical areas, of varying population sizes, though they were not coterminous with the Regions of New Zealand:

Name	Short name	Website	Area covered	Population
Auckland	ADHB	www.adhb.health.nz	Central Auckland	545,640
Bay of Plenty	BOPDHB	www.bopdhb.govt.nz	Tauranga City, Western Bay of Plenty District, Whakatane District, Kawerau District, Opotiki District	265,000
Canterbury	CDHB	www.cdhb.health.nz	Christchurch City, Kaikōura District, Hurunui District, Waimakariri District, Selwyn District, Ashburton District, Chatham Islands	567,870
Capital and Coast	CCDHB	www.ccdhb.org.nz	Wellington City, Porirua City, Kāpiti Coast District (excluding Ōtaki ward)	318,040
Counties Manukau	CM Health	www.countiesmanukau.health.nz	Pre-amalgamation Manukau City, Papakura District, Franklin District	563,210
Hawke's Bay	HBDHB	hawkesbay.health.nz	Wairoa District, Hastings District, Napier City, Central Hawke's Bay District	165,610
Hutt Valley	Hutt Valley DHB	www.huttvalleydhb.org.nz	Upper Hutt City, Lower Hutt City	149,680
Lakes		www.lakesdhb.govt.nz	Rotorua Lakes, Taupō District	110,410
MidCentral	MDHB	www.midcentraldhb.govt.nz	Manawatū District, Palmerston North City, Tararua District, Horowhenua District, Ōtaki ward of Kāpiti Coast District	178,820
Nelson Marlborough	NMDHB	www.nmdhb.govt.nz	Tasman District, Nelson City, Marlborough District	150,770
Northland	NDHB	www.northlanddhb.org.nz	Far North District, Whangarei District, Kaipara District	179,370
South Canterbury	SCDHB	www.scdhb.health.nz	Timaru District, Mackenzie District, Waimate District	60,220
Southern	Southern DHB	www.southernhealth.nz	Waitaki District, Central Otago District, Queenstown Lakes District, Dunedin City, Clutha District, Gore District, Southland District, Invercargill City	329,890
Tairāwhiti	Hauora Tairāwhiti	www.hauoratairawhiti.org.nz	Gisborne District	49,050
Taranaki	TDHB	www.tdhb.org.nz	New Plymouth District, Stratford District, South Taranaki District	120,050
Waikato	Waikato DHB	www.waikatodhb.health.nz	Hamilton City, Waikato District, Matamata Piako District, Thames Coromandel District, Hauraki District, Waipā District, South Waikato District, Ōtorohanga District, Waitomo District, Ruapehu District excluding Waimarino-Waiouru ward.	419,890
Wairarapa	Wairarapa DHB	www.wairarapa.dhb.org.nz	Masterton District, Carterton District, South Wairarapa District	44,905
Waitematā	Waitematā DHB	www.waitematadhb.govt.nz	Pre-amalgamation North Shore City, Waitakere City, Rodney District	628,970
West Coast	WCDHB	www.wcdhb.health.nz	Buller District, Grey District, Westland District	32,410
Whanganui	WDHB	www.wdhb.org.nz	Wanganui District, Rangitikei District, Waimarino-Waiouru ward of Ruapehu District	64,550

== See also ==
- List of chairpersons of district health boards
- Association of Salaried Medical Specialists, a trade union that represents just over 4000 senior salaried doctors and dentists, most of whom are employed by DHBs
- List of hospitals in New Zealand
