= Counties Manukau District Health Board =

District health board in Auckland, New Zealand

- Location of the Counties Manukau DHB (green) in New Zealand
- Formation: 1 January 2001
- Dissolved: 1 July 2022; 4 years ago
- Purpose: DHB
- Chief Executive: Fepulea'i Margie Apa
- Parent organization: Ministry of Health
- Subsidiaries: Northern Regional Alliance Ltd (33.5%) healthAlliance NZ Ltd (20%); NZ Health Innovation Hub Limited (20%)
- Budget: $1.5 billion (NZD) (2015)
- Revenue: $1.485 billion (NZD) (2015)
- Expenses: $1.483 billion (NZD) (2015)
- Staff: 7,400 (2015)
- Website: www.countiesmanukau.health.nz

The Counties Manukau District Health Board (CM Health) was a district health board which focused on providing healthcare to the Counties Manukau area in southern Auckland, New Zealand. As of 2016, it was responsible for 534,750 residents; or 11% of New Zealand's population. In July 2022, CM Health was merged into the national health service Te Whatu Ora (Health New Zealand).

== History ==
The Counties Manukau District Health Board, like most other district health boards (DHBs), came into effect on 1 January 2001 established by the New Zealand Public Health and Disability Act 2000.

On 1 July 2022, the Counties Manukau DHB was merged into Te Whatu Ora (Health New Zealand), which took over the functions and responsibilities of the former DHBs including hospitals and health services. Counties Manukau was subsumed into Te Whatu Ora's Northern division.

== Facilities ==
Middlemore Hospital is the largest facility under the management of CM Health, however they manage multiple other facilities, which include Kidz First Children's Hospital, the Manukau Surgery Centre, Pukekohe Hospital, Franklin Memorial Hospital, Botany Downs Maternity Unit and Papakura Maternity Unit as well as dedicated mental health and rehabilitation units. There are also specialised smaller scale health centres referred to as SuperClinics, they are, Manukau SuperClinic and Botany SuperClinic.

== Geographic area ==
The area covered by the Counties Manukau District Health Board is defined in Schedule 1 of the New Zealand Public Health and Disability Act 2000 and based on territorial authority and ward boundaries as constituted as at 1 January 2001. The area can be adjusted through an Order in Council.

CM Health is divided into four divisions, Otara-Mangere, Manukau, Franklin, and Eastern. These divisions are called Localities.

=== Franklin ===
Franklin is the largest locality in CM Health and has a population of around 70,000 representing 14% of the CM population. The population of Franklin Locality is a European majority locality with only 27% of the population not being European (17% Māori, 4% Pasifika, and 6% Others).

=== Otara-Mangere ===
Otara-Mangere is the smallest locality under CM Health and accounts for roughly 32% of the CM population at around 166,500. Of the population 110,000 are registered with a doctors practice, 68,000 in Māngere and 42,000 in Ōtara. Included in the Otara-Mangere Locality is the northern portion of Papatoetoe as well as a small portion of Ōtāhuhu. The population of the Otara-Mangere Locality is 65% Pasifika, 20% Māori, 8% European, and 7% other.

=== Eastern ===
The Eastern Locality geographical area includes urban areas of Howick, Pakuranga, Dannemora, East Tāmaki and Flat Bush and extends to the rural areas of Beachlands, Maraetai, Clevedon, Kawakawa Bay and Ōrere Point. With a population of 145,000, Eastern Locality holds around 28.5% of the CM Population. Of this 28.5%, 114,000 or 24% of CM Health's population are registered with a general practice within the Eastern Locality. The Eastern Locality has the oldest age average of CM Health's jurisdiction with over 16,000 residents over the age of 65. The majority of Eastern Locality is persons of Chinese and/or Indian descent; it is estimated that over two-thirds of CM Health's Chinese population and one-third of its Indian population live within the Eastern Locality.

=== Manukau ===
Manukau Locality is the largest by population with 35% representing 187,000 people. Manukau has the largest concentration of people representing 56% of CM Health's total Maori, 37% of its total Pacific population, 53% of its total Indian population, and 24% of Other populations.

== Governance ==
The initial board was fully appointed. Since the 2001 local elections, the board has been partially elected (seven members) and in addition, up to four members get appointed by the Minister of Health. The minister also appoints the chairperson and deputy-chair from the pool of eleven board members.

=== Current board (2019–2022) ===
Elections for the board are held every three years. There are also four appointed members; Mark Gosche (chair), Patrick Snedden (deputy chair), George Ngatai and Kylie Clegg.

Member(s)	Affiliation (if any)
Catherine Abel-Pattinson	Team Health
Paul Young	Independent
Colleen Brown	Team Health
Apulu Autagavaia	Labour
Dianne Glenn	Independent
Katrina Bungard	C&R
Garry Boles	C&R

== Demographics ==
Historical population
Year	Pop.	±% p.a.
2006	433,083	—
2013	469,296	+1.15%
2018	537,633	+2.76%

Counties Manukau DHB served a population of 537,633 at the 2018 New Zealand census, an increase of 68,337 people (14.6%) since the 2013 census, and an increase of 104,550 people (24.1%) since the 2006 census. There were 150,702 households. There were 267,261 males and 270,369 females, giving a sex ratio of 0.99 males per female. The median age was 33.0 years (compared with 37.4 years nationally), with 123,513 people (23.0%) aged under 15 years, 121,347 (22.6%) aged 15 to 29, 233,424 (43.4%) aged 30 to 64, and 59,349 (11.0%) aged 65 or older.

Ethnicities were 41.7% European/Pākehā, 16.3% Māori, 25.3% Pacific peoples, 28.2% Asian, and 2.6% other ethnicities. People may identify with more than one ethnicity.

The percentage of people born overseas was 39.2, compared with 27.1% nationally.

Although some people objected to giving their religion, 34.7% had no religion, 42.7% were Christian, 6.4% were Hindu, 2.8% were Muslim, 1.8% were Buddhist and 6.0% had other religions.

Of those at least 15 years old, 80,169 (19.4%) people had a bachelor or higher degree, and 73,887 (17.8%) people had no formal qualifications. The median income was $31,200, compared with $31,800 nationally. 63,117 people (15.2%) earned over $70,000 compared to 17.2% nationally. The employment status of those at least 15 was that 213,216 (51.5%) people were employed full-time, 51,213 (12.4%) were part-time, and 19,575 (4.7%) were unemployed.

== Hospitals ==
=== Public hospitals ===
- Middlemore Hospital (36.9640701°S 174.8383995°E) in Māngere has 889 beds and provides geriatric, mental health, children's health, maternity, surgical, medical and psychogeriatric services.
- Auckland Spinal Rehabilitation (36.9578838°S 174.8535152°E) in Papatoetoe has 20 beds and provides medical services.
- Botany Downs Hospital (36.8671895°S 174.6761702°E) in Botany Downs has 20 beds and provides maternity services.
- Franklin Memorial Hospital (37.2459498°S 174.7356394°E) in Waiuku has 18 beds and provides geriatric services.
- Manukau Surgery Centre (37.0082724°S 174.8850646°E) in Wiri has78 beds and provides surgical services.
- Papakura Obstetric Hospital (37.0621487°S 174.9430593°E) in Papakura has 13 beds and provides maternity services.
- Pukekohe Hospital (37.2178024°S 174.9018199°E) in Pukekohe has 32 beds and provides geriatric and maternity services.
- Tamaki Oranga (36.9577901°S 174.8533875°E) in Papatoetoe has 20 beds and provides mental health services.

=== Private hospitals ===
- Nga Hau Mangere Birthing Centre (36.9713734°S 174.7950322°E) in Māngere has 20 beds and provides maternity services.
- Ormiston Surgical & Endoscopy (36.9647953°S 174.9032061°E) in Flat Bush has 32 beds and provides surgical and medical services.
- Totara Hospice (37.0040465°S 174.9155036°E) in The Gardens has 18 beds and provides medical services.
