= Hamilton North, New Zealand =

Suburb of Hamilton, New Zealand

Hamilton North
- Suburb
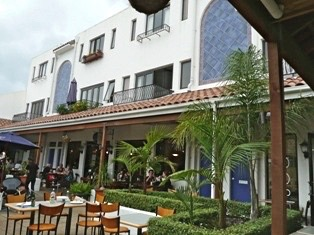
- Casabella Lane, Hamilton North.
- Interactive map of Hamilton North
- Coordinates: 37°46′57.83″S 175°16′31.43″E
- Country: New Zealand
- City: Hamilton, New Zealand
- Local authority: Hamilton City Council
- Electoral ward: West Ward
- Established: 1963

Area
  - Land: 56 ha (140 acres)

Population (June 2025)
  - Total: 880
  - Density: 1,600/km^{2} (4,100/sq mi)

Whitiora		River Road
Frankton	Hamilton North	Claudelands
	Hamilton Lake	Hamilton Central

Hamilton North is a suburb in central Hamilton in New Zealand. It was not depicted a suburb until there was a need to distinguish between the different parts of the Hamilton CBD. The suburbs of Hamilton Central and Hamilton North were divided in 1963.

== Demographics ==
Kirikiriroa statistical area, which corresponds to Hamilton North, covers 0.56 km^{2} (0.22 sq mi) and had an estimated population of 880 as of June 2025, with a population density of 1,571 people per km^{2}.

Historical population
Year	Pop.	±% p.a.
2006	129	—
2013	369	+16.20%
2018	528	+7.43%
2023	822	+9.26%
The 2006 population is for a smaller area of 0.51 km^{2}. Source:

Kirikiriroa had a population of 822 in the 2023 New Zealand census, an increase of 294 people (55.7%) since the 2018 census, and an increase of 453 people (122.8%) since the 2013 census. There were 423 males, 399 females and 3 people of other genders in 438 dwellings. 6.2% of people identified as LGBTIQ+. The median age was 32.8 years (compared with 38.1 years nationally). There were 114 people (13.9%) aged under 15 years, 225 (27.4%) aged 15 to 29, 411 (50.0%) aged 30 to 64, and 72 (8.8%) aged 65 or older.

People could identify as more than one ethnicity. The results were 51.8% European (Pākehā); 27.4% Māori; 4.0% Pasifika; 25.5% Asian; 4.7% Middle Eastern, Latin American and African New Zealanders (MELAA); and 1.5% other, which includes people giving their ethnicity as "New Zealander". English was spoken by 94.5%, Māori language by 8.8%, Samoan by 0.7%, and other languages by 23.4%. No language could be spoken by 2.6% (e.g. too young to talk). New Zealand Sign Language was known by 0.4%. The percentage of people born overseas was 36.1, compared with 28.8% nationally.

Religious affiliations were 23.4% Christian, 6.2% Hindu, 4.4% Islam, 1.1% Māori religious beliefs, 2.2% Buddhist, 1.1% New Age, and 2.9% other religions. People who answered that they had no religion were 51.1%, and 6.6% of people did not answer the census question.

Of those at least 15 years old, 246 (34.7%) people had a bachelor's or higher degree, 324 (45.8%) had a post-high school certificate or diploma, and 144 (20.3%) people exclusively held high school qualifications. The median income was $45,300, compared with $41,500 nationally. 99 people (14.0%) earned over $100,000 compared to 12.1% nationally. The employment status of those at least 15 was that 390 (55.1%) people were employed full-time, 87 (12.3%) were part-time, and 36 (5.1%) were unemployed.

== Features of Hamilton North ==
=== Waikato Stadium ===
Waikato Stadium, formerly Rugby Park, is a major sporting and cultural events venue in Hamilton with a total capacity of 25,800. The stadium is a multi-purpose facility, though used mainly for rugby union.

=== Founders Theatre ===
Founders Theatre was Hamilton's largest and best-known theatrical venue with a capacity of 1,249, opened in 1961. It was officially opened on 17 November 1962 by Mayor Denis Rogers, and the Dame Hilda Ross Memorial Fountain, in front of the theatre, was opened by Prime Minister Keith Holyoake in 1963. The theatre also performed an important Town Hall function for the city hosting many Civic and Institutional ceremonies. The adjacent fountain in Boyes Park was built in 1978 for $87,000 and contains a time capsule of Hamilton's Centenary.

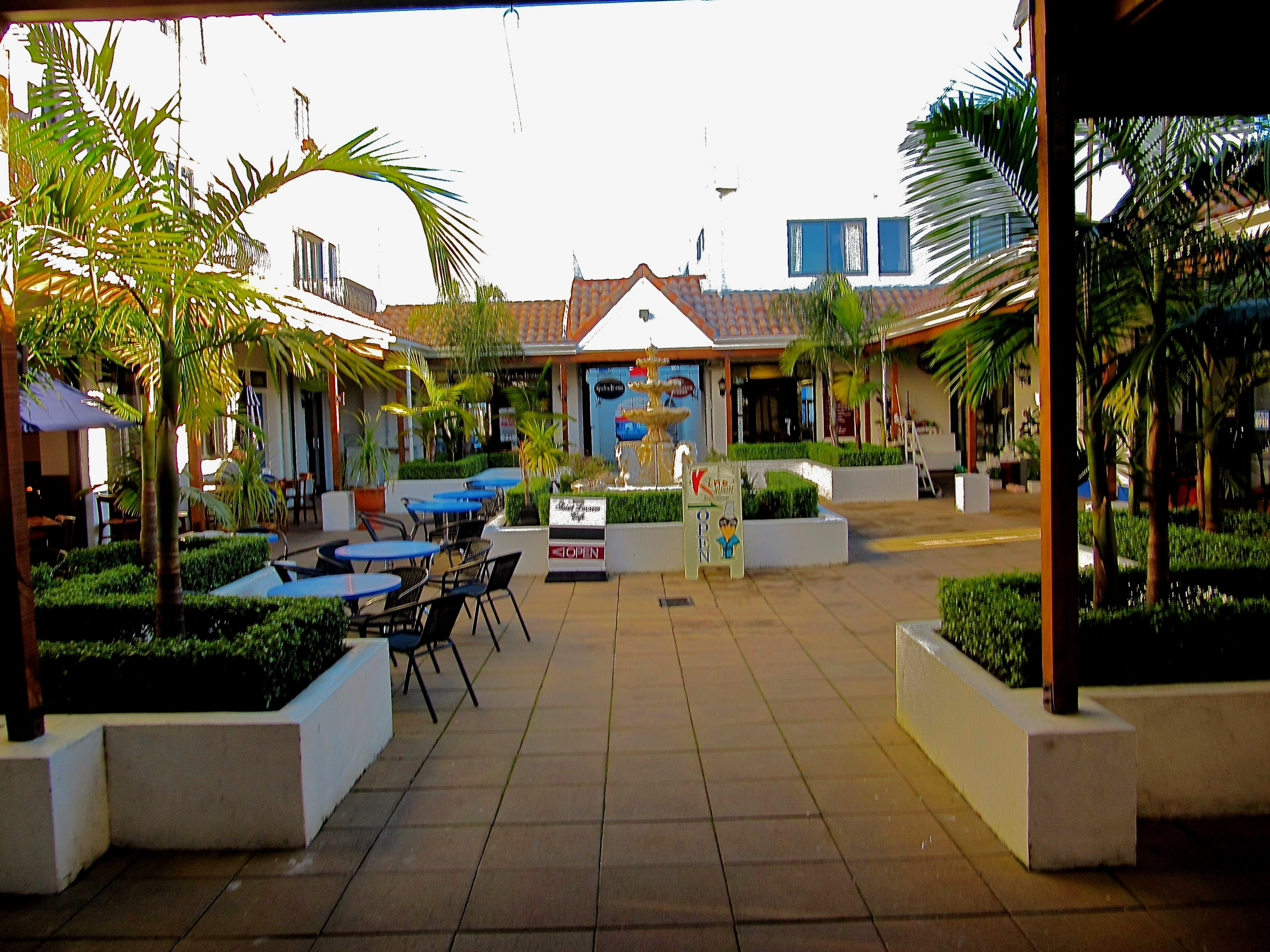
Casabella Lane north end

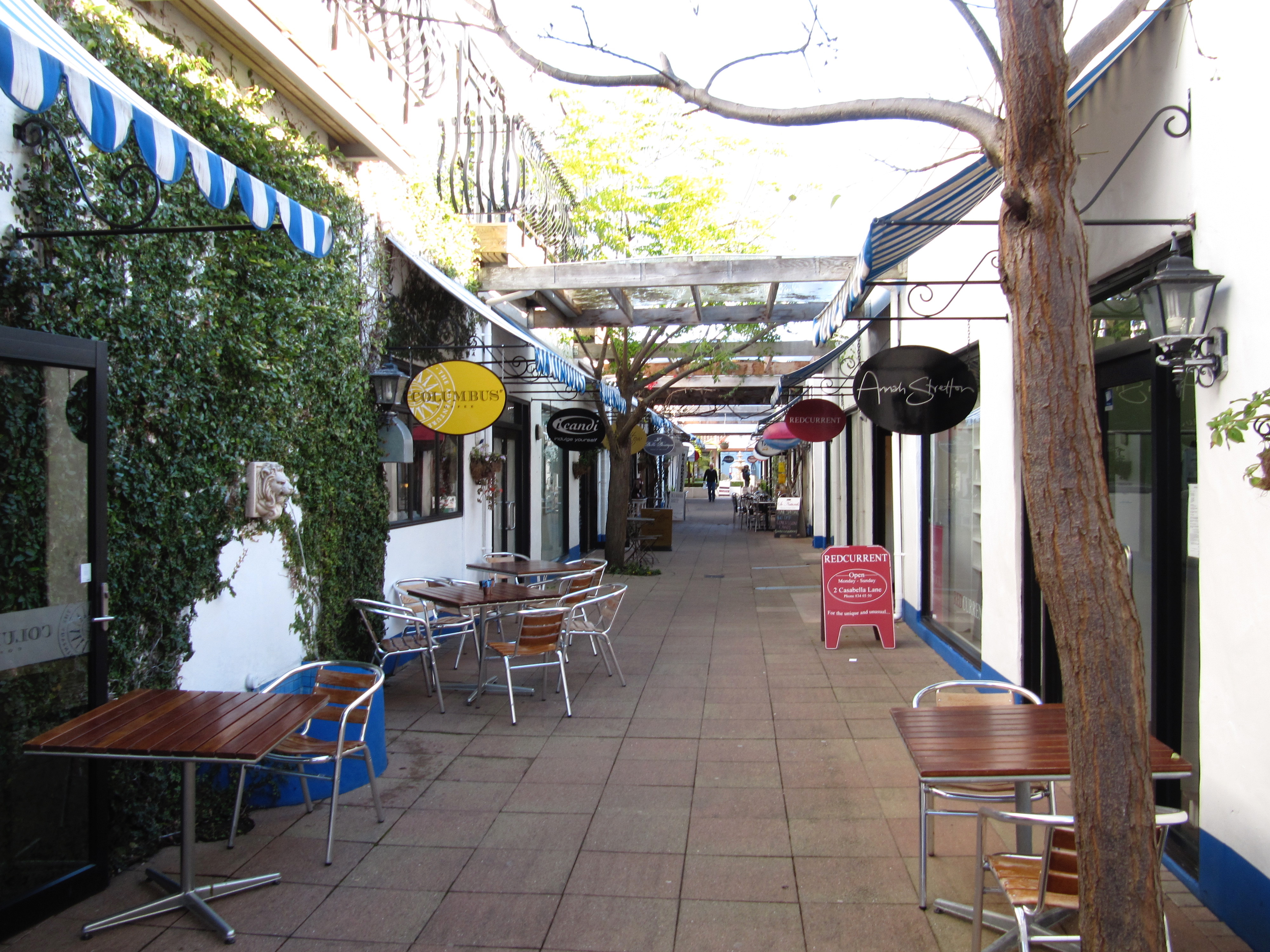
Casabella Lane shops

In 2015 the flying system, holding stage curtains, lights, scenery, etc was found to be unsafe. The theatre doors closed on 1 March 2016, due to health and safety concerns. The city council took submissions from residents of Hamilton to decide its future and was, in 2018, exploring proposals. Further investigation classified the theatre as earthquake-prone, so a vote was taken by the council that it be demolished despite extensive protests.

=== Casabella Lane ===
Located between Barton St and Angelsea St, Casabella Lane is a Spanish themed lane with 21 boutique shops and 9 apartments, built about 2000.

=== The Farming Family ===
The Farming Family was donated to the city by controversial businessman, Sir Robert Jones, in 1990 to commemorate the ordinary farming family as being the unsung heroes of Hamilton's 150-year history. The statue, a bronze life-sized sculpture created by Margriet Windhausen van den Berg, has sparked much debate about whether it solely celebrates the European history of the Waikato region. The Farming Family consists of a male farmer and his wife, two young children, a dairy cow, a sheep and a dog. The statue is located on a traffic island at the intersection of Victoria Street and Ulster Street. It has been described as "racist and offensive".

== See also ==
- Suburbs of Hamilton, New Zealand
