= Tīraumea River (Manawatū-Whanganui) =

- Route of the Tīraumea River
- Mouth of the Tīraumea River Tīraumea River (Manawatū-Whanganui) (North Island)
- Native name: Tīraumea (Māori)

Location
- Country: New Zealand
- Island: North Island
- Region: Manawatū-Whanganui
- District: Tararua

Physical characteristics
- Source: Confluence of the Tīraumea Stream and Waitawhiti Stream
  - location: Tīraumea
  - coordinates: 40.6607°S 175.9975°E
  - elevation: 330 m (1,080 ft)
- Mouth: Mangatainoka River
  - location: Haukōpuapua Scenic Reserve, Mangatainoka
  - coordinates: 40°24′03″S 175°53′50″E
  - elevation: 77 m (253 ft)
- Length: 25 km (16 mi)

Basin features
- Progression: Tīraumea River → Mangatainoka River → Manawatū River → Manawatū Estuary → Tasman Sea
- River system: Tīraumea River Catchment
- Tributaries
  - left: Happy Creek, Ihuraua River, Pari Stream, Mangaone River
  - right: Waipori Stream, Manuka Stream, Hirinakitu Stream, Puketi Creek, Makahikatea Creek, Makuri River, Ngaturi Creek, Waitakotorua Stream, Makairo Stream
- Bridges: Pori Road Bridge, Patricks Bridge (Route 52), Napiers Bridge (Route 52), Hinemoa Valley Road Bridge, Pahiatua-Pongaroa Road Bridge, Kohinui Road Bridge

The northern Tiraumea River is a river of the Manawatū-Whanganui region of New Zealand's North Island. The river rises in the rough hill country of the Tararua District, just south of the settlement of Tiraumea. A tributary, Tiraumea Stream, drains the southern end of the Puketoi Range. The river flows west then north to reach the Manawatū River immediately above the highway and Rail bridges, 5 kilometres (3 mi) south of Woodville.
