= Ihuraua River =

- Route of the Ihuraua River
- Mouth of the Ihuraua River Ihuraua River (North Island)
- Native name: Ihuraua (Māori)

Location
- Country: New Zealand
- Island: North Island
- Region: Manawatū-Whanganui
- District: Tararua

Physical characteristics
- Source: Ihuraua Stream
  - coordinates: 40.73472°S 175.8306°E
- Mouth: Tīraumea River
  - coordinates: 40°38′03″S 175°52′16″E
- Length: 22 km (14 mi)

Basin features
- Progression: Ihuraua River → Tīraumea River → Mangatainoka River → Manawatū River → Manawatū Estuary → Tasman Sea
- River system: Ihuraua River Catchment
- Cities: Alfredton
- Tributaries
  - left: Mangatakoto Stream
  - right: Ponui Stream, Te Hoe Stream
- Bridges: Alfredton Road Bridge, Pa Valley Road Bridge

The Ihuraua River is a river of the southern North Island of New Zealand. It flows north from its source southeast of Eketāhuna, joining with several streams to become the Tīraumea River north of Alfredton.

== See also ==
- List of rivers of New Zealand
