= Mangaone River (Manawatū-Whanganui) =

- Route of the Mangaone River
- Mouth of the Mangaone River Mangaone River (Manawatū-Whanganui) (North Island)
- Native name: Mangaone River (Māori)

Location
- Country: New Zealand
- Island: North Island
- Region: Manawatū-Whanganui
- District: Tararua

Physical characteristics
- Source: Mount Baker
  - coordinates: 40.6822°S 175.76391°E
  - elevation: 310 metres (1,020 ft)
- Mouth: Tīraumea River
  - coordinates: 40°30′50″S 175°52′49″E
  - elevation: 95 metres (312 ft)

Basin features
- Progression: Mangaone River → Tīraumea River → Mangatainoka River → Manawatū River → Manawatū Estuary → Tasman Sea
- River system: Mangaone River Catchment
- Tributaries
  - left: Ohuha Stream, Kokakonui Stream, Kokakoriki Stream, Makirikiri Stream, Tiratahi Stream, Kahurauihea Stream
  - right: Tawataia Creek, Mount Clive Stream, Pa Creek
- Bridges: Alfredton Road Bridge, Central East Road Bridge, Tawataia Road Bridge, Bridge near 840 Mangaone Valley Road, Bridge near 840 Mangaone Valley Road, Bridge near 2029 Mangaone Valley Road

The Mangaone River is a river of the Manawatū-Whanganui Region of New Zealand's North Island. Rising on the slopes of Mount Baker, it flows north and northeast to meet the Tīraumea River 2 kilometres (1.2 mi) south of the settlement of Kaitawa.

== See also ==
- List of rivers of New Zealand
