= Bush Advocate =

'The Bush Advocate' was a newspaper published in Dannevirke, Hawke's Bay, New Zealand.

== History ==
The newspaper was first published on 8 May 1888 in Dannevirke. In 1912 it was sold and merged with the Dannevirke Evening News.
