= Maharahara =

- Interactive map of Maharahara
- Coordinates: 40.260°S 175.958°E
- Country: New Zealand
- Region: Manawatū-Whanganui
- Territorial authority: Tararua District
- Ward: South Tararua General Ward; Tamaki nui-a Rua Maori Ward
- Electorates: Wairarapa; Ikaroa-Rāwhiti (Māori)

Government
  - Territorial Authority: Tararua District Council
  - Regional council: Horizons Regional Council

Area
  - Total: 23.52 km^{2} (9.08 sq mi)

Population (2023 census)
  - Total: 108
  - Density: 4.59/km^{2} (11.9/sq mi)
- Postcode(s): 4972

Maharahara is the name of a 1,095 m (3,593 ft) hill in the Ruahine Range and of two small hamlets (Maharahara and Maharahara West), some 10 km (6.2 mi) to the south. The hamlets are south of Dannevirke, in the Manawatū River valley, of the Manawatū-Whanganui region.

The area is in a corridor used for transport and power transmission. Maharahara is about 4 km (2.5 mi) north of Waiaruhe, which is on State Highway 2 and, until 1975, had Maharahara railway station on the Palmerston North–Napier-Gisborne line. A 110kV transmission line runs through Maharahara. Electricity was first switched on in Maharahara in 1925. The First Gas pipeline between Feilding and Takapau runs to the north of Maharahara and opened on 30 September 1983.

Maharahara translates as anxious, or to remember someone’s faults.

== History ==
Maharahara was a 13,000 acres (5,300 ha) block, bought by the government from Rangitāne as part of a purchase of 231,430 acres (93,660 ha) of the Seventy Mile Bush for £16,000 in 1871. On 16 February 1885 it was offered for sale, much of it under heavy bush of matai, tawa, rata, with totara south of Raparapawai Stream. At that time a road was being cleared, the Napier-Wellington railway had reached Tahoraiti and the nearest station would be Oringi, about 3 mi (4.8 km) from the east side of the block. As it developed, Maharahara had a school, blacksmith and store with a post office (open by 1889).

Maharahara Road District was set up in 1885 as part of Waipawa County and absorbed back into the county in 1897. Four years later, Maharahara Riding was one of 4 ridings in Woodville County from the formation of the county in 1901. Woodville County inherited the Road District's debt.

Maharahara West is about 2 km (1.2 mi) west of Maharahara. Its post office opened in 1893 and it had a school.

Maharahara railway station
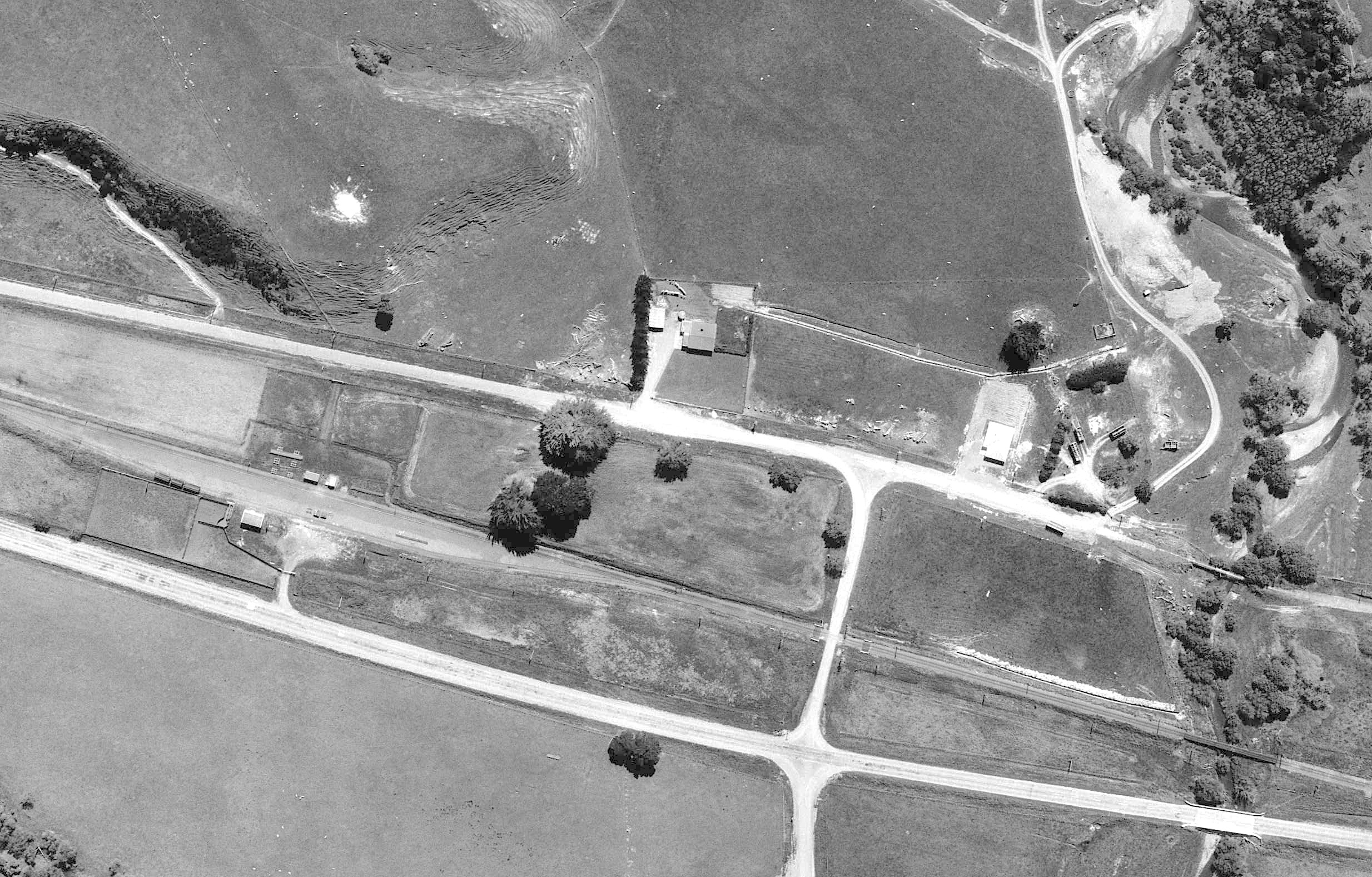
- Maharahara railway station in 1962

General information
- Coordinates: 40°16′52″S 175°59′37″E
- Elevation: 165 m (541 ft)
- Owner: KiwiRail
- Line: Palmerston North–Gisborne Line
- Distance: Palmerston North 43.75 km (27.18 mi)

History
- Opened: 22 March 1887
- Closed: 15 October 1972 to passengers 30 March 1975 to goods
- Former names: Matahiwi until 2 May 1904

Services
Preceding station	Historical railways	Following station
Papatawa; Line open, station closed 7.43 km (4.62 mi) towards PN	Palmerston North–Gisborne Line; KiwiRail	Oringi; Line open, station closed 3.49 km (2.17 mi) towards Napier
Location

=== Railway station ===
Maharahara railway station on the Palmerston North–Gisborne line, opened as Matahiwi on 22 March 1887 and was renamed Maharahara on 2 May 1904. It closed to passengers on 15 October 1972 and completely on 30 March 1975. Only a single line now passes through the station site.

==== History ====
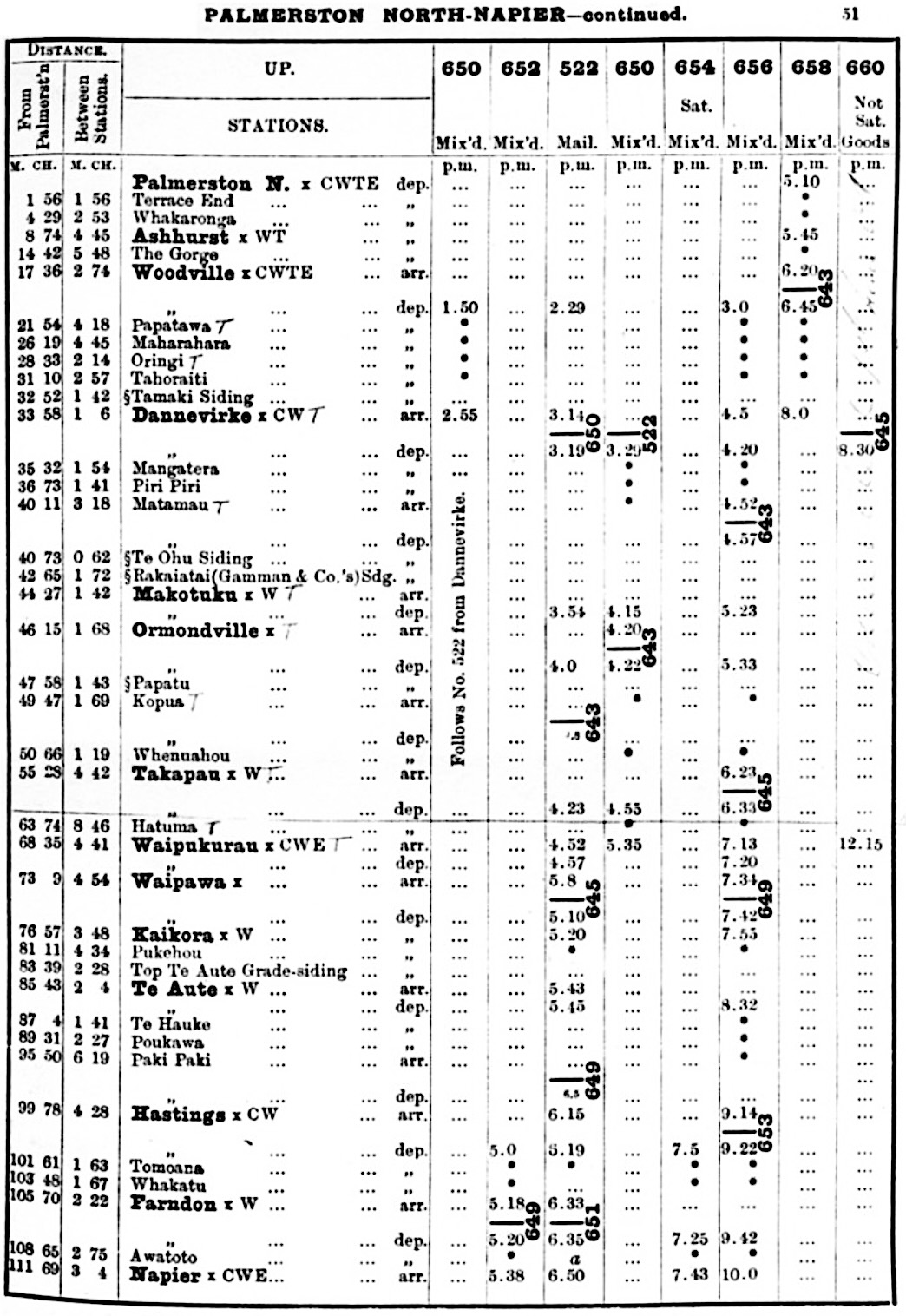
1909 timetable, showing Maharahara had 3 mixed trains a day by then

In 1870 a report was made to the engineer, John Blackett, recommending a railway line running through Matahiwi, where it would leave open country and enter the Seventy Mile Bush. Contracts to clear a line, 66 ft (20 m) wide, through, for what later became SH2, were let in 1871. By 1879 the railway line to Matahiwi was being explored and contoured.

In April 1886 it was decided that Matahiwi station should be moved to the junction of Heretaunga Road. The line through Maharahara opened on 22 March 1887, when the 15 mi 10 ch (24.3 km) Tahoraiti (later Tapuata) to Woodville section extended the line from Napier and the flag station had 2 trains a day.

In 1896 a 30 ft (9.1 m) x 15 ft (4.6 m) goods shed was built on piles for £70 by local carpenters and there was a shelter shed (in 1949 the station building was described as 16 ft (4.9 m) x 7 ft (2.1 m)), platform, cart access, loading bank, water service, urinals and a passing loop for 27 wagons. In 1898 the loop was for 30 wagons and further lengthened in 1959 to 38 wagons, though that year it was agreed it could be removed, as trains had rarely stalled on the 1 in 53 gradient of Matahiwi bank, from Papatawa to Maharahara, since the use of J and K classes. The loop appears to have been out of use by 1972 and removed by 1983. Cattle and sheep yards were added in 1898 for £45, plus £30 contributed by local farmers and £54 was spent on improvements in 1926. A 20 ft (6.1 m) long loading bank was built for £20 about 1904. In 1912 there was a complaint about a lodging hut on it. A new 25 ft (7.6 m) x 14 ft (4.3 m) goods shed cost £699 in 1951 to replace the one beyond repair. It was sold in October 1972. In 1958 the station buildings were taken over by the District Engineer as staff shelter sheds.

In 1893 N Campbell was given the right to lay a tramway at Matahiwi. He sold the mill to Palmerston North Sash, Door & Timber Co Ltd in 1894. In 1899 it was decided that the cost of signals to protect the tramway crossing would be £70 and the wages of a signalman £109 11s a year.

From Monday, 2 May 1904 the name Matahiwi was officially changed to Maharahara. A 1921 petition to the Minister for Railways asked for Maharahara station to be changed to Waiaruhe, the name of the post office and saying it was the original name of the block.

In 1936 the wind pump was moved to Linton and water for engines was no longer available. Until a diversion in 1937 the main road had 2 level crossings over the railway. A lavatory caught fire on 24 February 1945 and was replaced for about £100. Maharahara closed to goods and passengers, except goods in wagon lots, on 15 October 1972 and to all traffic from 30 March 1975. In 1974 it still had a siding, platform, stockyards, goods shed and loading bank. On 19 June 1975 $205 was accepted for removal of the stockyards.

=== Mining ===
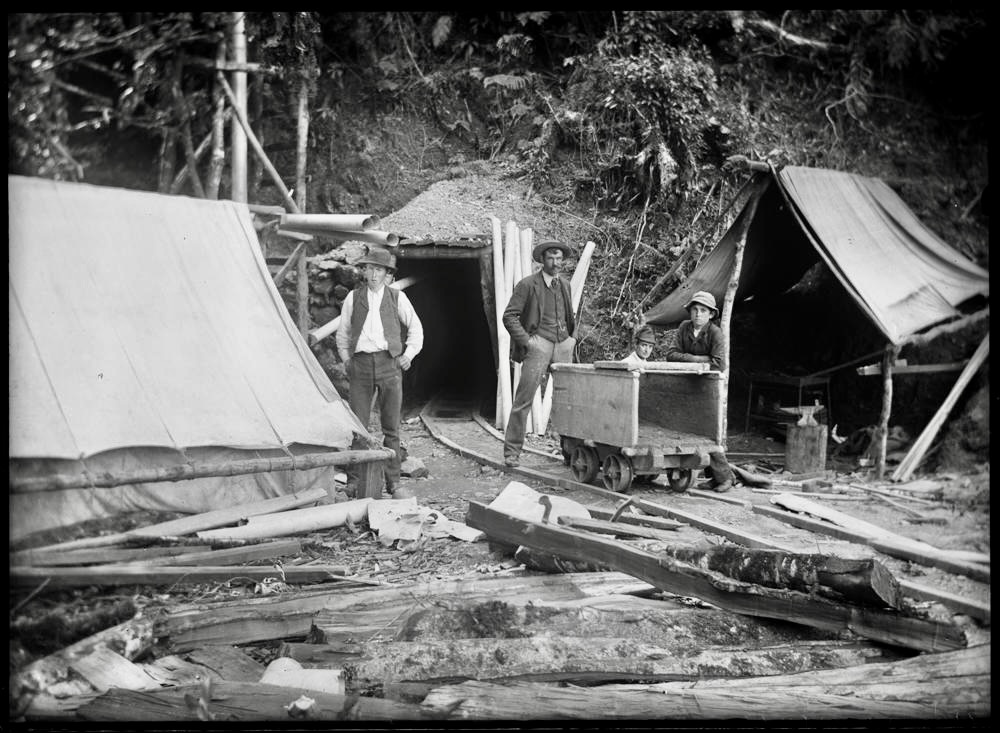
Maharahara copper mine in the 1890s

Copper was mined from 1888 in 1907 and again in 1930, from a narrow seam in Mesozoic greywacke, but yields were small. A report was also written on an outcrop of jet, but it too was small and its gem, or coal quality wasn't established. In 1902 traces of gold were analysed in samples of iron pyrites and slate.

=== Dairying ===
In 1901 a co-operative cheese factory was purchased by Crown Dairy Co of Taranaki and turned into a creamery. For about 11 years this served the district, but, as cheese prices rose, Mr H. Black altered a creamery to a cheese factory. A meeting of prospective suppliers decided to buy the cheese factory. Maharahara Co-operative Cheese Co Ltd was registered on 6 September 1916. In 1917 a curing room and whey tank were added and at the first annual meeting 33 suppliers were present. A Manager's house was built in 1923 and electricity installed in 1925. In 1927 electric light was installed in the factory but it was not until 1930 that electric motors were used. On 21 April 1930 fire destroyed a wooden building, a concrete curing room, 27 tons of cheese and 5 vats. The factory was rebuilt, nearly opposite the old factory, with a 3,000 gallon glass lined tank, pasteuriser and 4 cheese vats, opened in November 1930. An automatic stoker was installed in 1936, to burn coal instead of wood, replaced by oil in 1959. Suppliers decreased from 33 to 22 in the 1941 to 19 in 1944. The whey cream plant was sold in 1945, but 542 tons of cheese were made in 1950-51 and suppliers rose to 36. In 1960-61 tanker collection began. In 1963 Rawhiti Dairy Ltd was bought to deliver milk in an area from Waipawa to Pahiatua. In 1964 cheese production ceased. In 1966 the company became Hawke's Bay Milk Producers Association, which was taken over by Kiwi Co-op in 1996. By 2025 the dairy had closed, but the buildings remained.

Waiaruhe Co-operative Dairy Co was open by 1920 and went into liquidation in 1949.

== Demographics ==
Maharahara locality covers 23.52 km^{2} (9.08 sq mi). It is part of the larger Papatawa statistical area.

Historical population
Year	Pop.	±% p.a.
2006	129	—
2013	144	+1.58%
2018	117	−4.07%
2023	108	−1.59%

Maharahara had a population of 108 in the 2023 New Zealand census, a decrease of 9 people (−7.7%) since the 2018 census, and a decrease of 36 people (−25.0%) since the 2013 census. There were 60 males and 48 females in 39 dwellings. The median age was 35.2 years (compared with 38.1 years nationally). There were 15 people (13.9%) aged under 15 years, 27 (25.0%) aged 15 to 29, 54 (50.0%) aged 30 to 64, and 9 (8.3%) aged 65 or older.

People could identify as more than one ethnicity. The results were 77.8% European (Pākehā), 13.9% Māori, 13.9% Asian, and 5.6% other, which includes people giving their ethnicity as "New Zealander". English was spoken by 100.0%, Māori by 2.8%, and other languages by 11.1%. The percentage of people born overseas was 16.7, compared with 28.8% nationally.

Religious affiliations were 41.7% Christian, 2.8% Hindu, 2.8% Māori religious beliefs, and 2.8% other religions. People who answered that they had no religion were 44.4%, and 8.3% of people did not answer the census question.

Of those at least 15 years old, 15 (16.1%) people had a bachelor's or higher degree, 60 (64.5%) had a post-high school certificate or diploma, and 24 (25.8%) people exclusively held high school qualifications. The median income was $44,900, compared with $41,500 nationally. 15 people (16.1%) earned over $100,000 compared to 12.1% nationally. The employment status of those at least 15 was 57 (61.3%) full-time and 12 (12.9%) part-time.

In 1906 the riding had 603 people, and 625 in 1956.

== Schools ==
Maharahara once had 3 schools, but they have closed and it is now within the catchment zones of Ruahine primary and Dannevirke secondary schools, which have school buses linking them with Maharahara.

Maharahara school opened in 1890 and closed in 1952.

Maharahara West school was open by 1894 and closed in 1985, after more than 30 years under the tenure of sole charge teacher Mr Tom Dunn.

Matahiwi school opened in 1907, changed its name to Waiaruhe in 1921 and closed in the 1990s.

== Walking tracks ==
The walking tracks in the Ruahine range are described individually, but it is possible to combine them into a traverse from Wharite Peak to Maharahara peak and beyond, though routes can be hard to find.

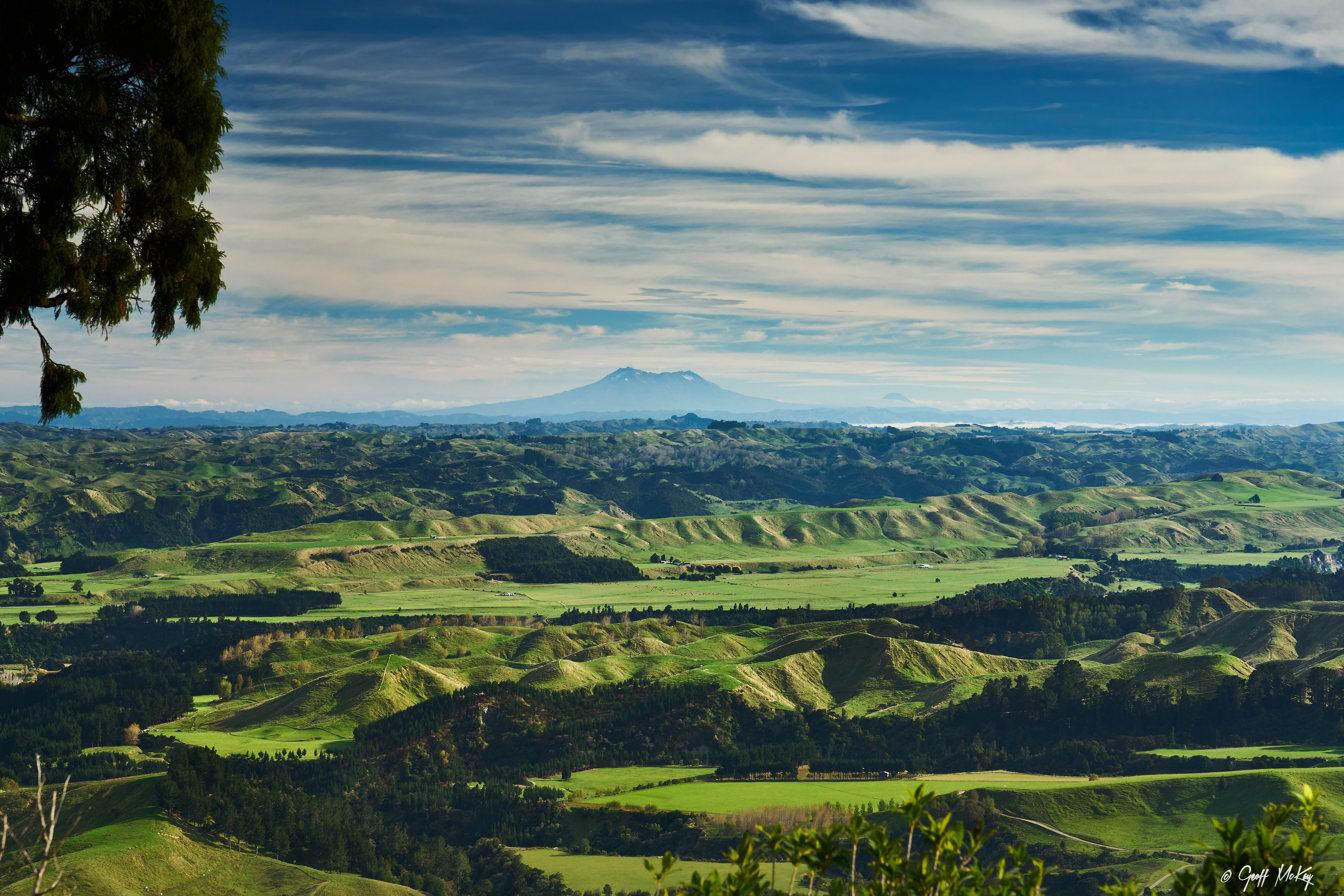
From Maharahara Peak Track to Pohangina valley and Ruapehu

Maharahara Peak Track is a clear, but often muddy track between Opawe Road and Kiritaki hut, or Kumeti or Fairbrother Road. It starts by crossing farmland, then climbs steeply through rimu, kāmahi and tawa forest and goes over rocky knolls to a summit at Maharahara, crossing the largest, unbroken mass of tūpare (leatherwood) in the country. The rata and kamahi forest was, by the 1950s, severely damaged, possibly by the selective browsing of possums from the 1890s, but also by high winds, heavy rains and slips. It is now a low vegetation of rangiora, Brachyglottis eleagnifolia, horopito, kātote, Rubus cissioides (tātarāmoa, bush lawyer), Histiopteris incisa (mātātā, water fern) and pampas grass. Decline in pāhautea and pink pine had been noticed before possums were introduced and may be due to climate change.

Coppermine Loop Track climbs to about 720 m (2,360 ft) before dropping back to the valley near the mine at about 400 m (1,300 ft). It also has a link north, via Granges Track and a couple of undefined stream routes to Kiritaki hut.

Coppermine Track climbs with the stream to the mine, through a valley of podocarps, including rimu and totara. It starts on an easy track, but ends on the stream bed.

Wharite Peak Track runs from the Coppermine and Coppermine Loop Tracks to the road up the Peak via a boggy track, which climbs steeply to the tūpare covered ridge, with views to Kapiti Island, Pūkaha / Mount Bruce and Ruapehu.

== Notable people ==
- Dame Peggy Koopman-Boyden, gerontologist, lived at Maharahara West.
