= Papatawa =

Locality in New Zealand

- Settlement
- Interactive map of Papatawa
- Coordinates: 40.321°S 175.920°E
- Country: New Zealand
- Region: Manawatū-Whanganui
- District: Tararua
- Ward: South Tararua General Ward; Tamaki nui-a Rua Maori Ward
- Electorates: Wairarapa; Ikaroa-Rāwhiti (Māori)

Government
  - Territorial Authority: Tararua District Council
  - Regional council: Horizons Regional Council
  - Tararua Mayor: Scott Gilmore
  - Wairarapa MP: TBD
  - Ikaroa-Rāwhiti MP: Cushla Tangaere-Manuel

Area
  - Total: 109.97 km^{2} (42.46 sq mi)

Population (2023 Census)
  - Total: 330
  - Density: 3.0/km^{2} (7.8/sq mi)

Papatawa is a rural community in the Tararua District and Manawatū-Whanganui region of New Zealand's North Island. It is located six kilometres north-east of Woodville, on both sides of State Highway 2.

The area has no shops, and locals use Palmerston North, Pahiatua and Dannevirke as service centres.

== History ==
=== 19th century ===
European settlement of the area began in 1878, when an area of forest called the Victoria Block was cleared and subdivided into 36 farming sections. The name of the post office was changed from Victoria to Papatawa in 1896.

The Manga-atua School house opened in the area 1887, with a roll of the 18 pupils increasing to 22 within the first day. The school changed its name to Papatawa School in 1905, and it eventually gained an extra classroom.

=== 20th century ===
In 1910 John A. Millar, the Minister of Railways in the Ward Ministry, denied a request for a railway loading bank at Papatawa, citing a lack of funds.

By the 1930s, the area had a dairy factory, a railway station, a county council yard, and a team of horses in stables. The area was connected by gravel roads, two rail lines and a shunting line. Cheese from the dairy factory was transported to the railway station by horse and cart, and most locals took the train to Woodville to do shopping.

During the Great Depression, workers built a tennis court at the school and turned the school to face the sun. A pool was installed in the 1960s.

=== 21st century ===
The 4.5 kilometre Papatawa stretch of State Highway 2 has been the site of several fatal crashes.

Between 2010 and 2014, the NZ Transport Agency realigned and straightened the 4.5 kilometre stretch of State Highway 2, with a new intersection, rail crossing, over-bridge, passing lane and stream diversion. The $11 million project aimed to reduce crashes and separate local traffic from the 700 trucks that were using the road between Tararua and Hawke's Bay each day.

=== Railway station ===
Papatawa railway station
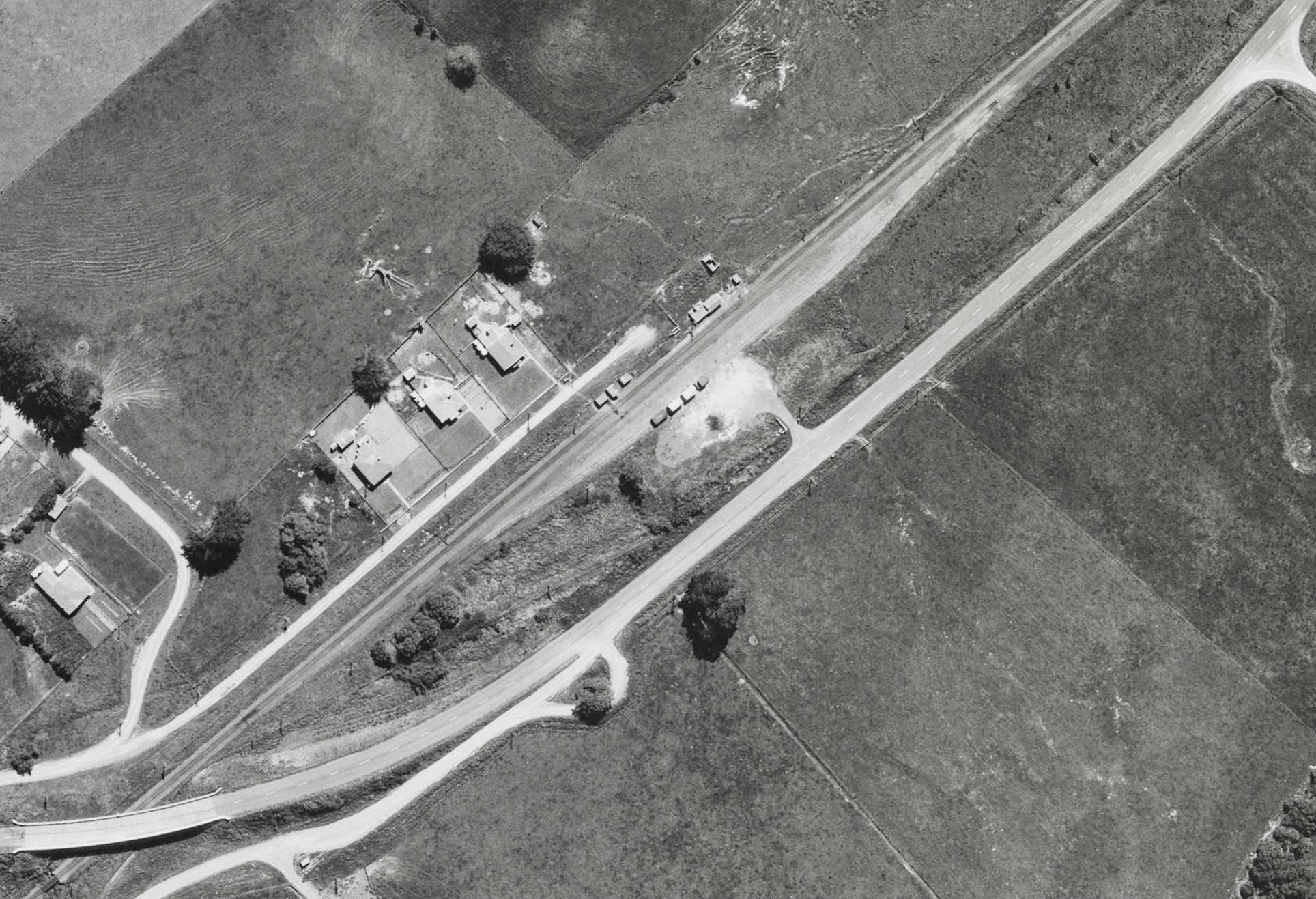
- Papatawa in 1962

General information
- Elevation: 120 m (390 ft)
- Owner: KiwiRail
- Line: Palmerston North–Gisborne Line
- Distance: Palmerston North 36.32 km (22.57 mi)

History
- Opened: 22 March 1887
- Closed: 2 July 1967
- Former names: Victoria until 1 May 1904

Services
Preceding station	Historical railways	Following station
Woodville; Line open, station closed 6.66 km (4.14 mi) towards PN	Palmerston North–Gisborne Line; KiwiRail	Maharahara; Line open, station closed 7.43 km (4.62 mi) towards Napier
Location

Papatawa railway station on the Palmerston North–Gisborne line, opened as Victoria in 1887 and was renamed Papatawa in 1904. It closed in 1967. Only a single line now passes through the station site.

==== History ====
The line through Victoria opened on 22 March 1887, when the 15 mi 10 ch (24.3 km) Tahoraiti (later Tapuata) to Woodville section extended the line from Napier and Victoria flag station had 2 trains a day. By 1909 there were 3 mixed trains a day. From Papatawa the line climbs a 1 in 53 gradient to Maharahara. By 1896 there was a shelter shed, platform, cart access, urinals and a passing loop for 27 wagons, extended for 33 wagons by 1898. From Sunday, 1 May 1904 the name of the station was changed from Victoria to Papatawa, though the Woodville Examiner reported the change as being from 1 March.

In 1890 Thomas Crosse had an application for sheep yards declined, "for want of funds". Similarly in 1910 John A. Millar, the Minister of Railways in the Ward Ministry, denied a request for a railway loading bank at Papatawa, citing a lack of funds, though a loading bank was listed as part of the accommodation at the station in 1904. More successful was an 1891 deputation, asking for the stopping of through trains at Victoria, though it took until 1895 before it happened. The service was lost in 1917 when the Wellington-Napier mail train was speeded up, by no longer stopping at 30 stations, including Papatawa.

In 1926 a locomotive fell over due to gravel on the level crossing. Bridge 131A is 80.363 m (263.66 ft) long and carries SH2 over the railway. It replaced the level crossing in 1940 and was renewed as part of the 2014 upgrades. On 2 July 1967 the station closed.

== Demographics ==
Papatawa locality covers 108.97 km^{2} (42.07 sq mi). It is part of the larger Mangatainoka statistical area.

Historical population
Year	Pop.	±% p.a.
2006	300	—
2013	336	+1.63%
2018	282	−3.44%
2023	330	+3.19%

Papatawa had a population of 330 in the 2023 New Zealand census, an increase of 48 people (17.0%) since the 2018 census, and a decrease of 6 people (−1.8%) since the 2013 census. There were 177 males, 150 females, and 6 people of other genders in 123 dwellings. 1.8% of people identified as LGBTIQ+. There were 69 people (20.9%) aged under 15 years, 66 (20.0%) aged 15 to 29, 147 (44.5%) aged 30 to 64, and 51 (15.5%) aged 65 or older.

People could identify as more than one ethnicity. The results were 90.0% European (Pākehā), 19.1% Māori, 1.8% Pasifika, and 2.7% Asian. English was spoken by 97.3%, Māori by 2.7%, Samoan by 0.9%, and other languages by 5.5%. No language could be spoken by 2.7% (e.g. too young to talk). New Zealand Sign Language was known by 0.9%. The percentage of people born overseas was 8.2, compared with 28.8% nationally.

Religious affiliations were 34.5% Christian, 0.9% Māori religious beliefs, and 1.8% other religions. People who answered that they had no religion were 50.9%, and 10.0% of people did not answer the census question.

Of those at least 15 years old, 36 (13.8%) people had a bachelor's or higher degree, 147 (56.3%) had a post-high school certificate or diploma, and 66 (25.3%) people exclusively held high school qualifications. 15 people (5.7%) earned over $100,000 compared to 12.1% nationally. The employment status of those at least 15 was 135 (51.7%) full-time, 39 (14.9%) part-time, and 6 (2.3%) unemployed.

== Education ==
Papatawa School was a co-educational state primary school for Year 1 to 8 students. The school opened in 1887 as Manga-atua School, changed its name about 1905, and operated through to August 2023 when it closed due to falling roll numbers. Children in the area now attend school in Woodville.

== Notable people ==
- Anna Leese, international opera singer raised in Papatawa
