= Papatawa School =

Location
- Papatawa; New Zealand; 40°18′27″S 175°54′35″E

Information
- Former name: Manga-atua School
- Motto: Learn for life
- Established: 5 September 1887
- Closed: 30 August 2023
- Grades: Year 1 to 8
- Website: www.sporty.co.nz/papatawa

Papatawa School was a co-educational state primary school for Year 1 to 8 students in Papatawa in the Manawatū-Whanganui region of New Zealand. The school operated from 1887 through to 2023.

== History ==
The school opened as Manga-atua School house in the 1887, with a roll of the 18 pupils increasing to 22 within the first day. The school changed its name to Papatawa School in 1905, and it eventually gained an extra classroom.

During the Great Depression, workers built a tennis court at the school and turned the school to face the sun. A pool was installed in the 1960s.

In the 1940s, girls would sweep the school on Friday afternoons while boys emptied the buckets in the toilets.

The school held major anniversary celebrations in 1937 and 1987.

In 2008, the school floated the idea of a voluntary closure but faced an uproar from the local community.

In 2009, a Ministry of Education review proposed closing eight of the ten schools in the Tararua bush area, including Papatawa School. Papatawa had 18 students at the time. Principal Louise Ilton told the Dominion Post:

"The kids are really worried; we got the message last year and have no plan to close."

The school marked its 130th anniversary with a celebration dinner in June 2017.

As of 2020, the school has a twice-weekly breakfast club sponsored by Fonterra and Sanitarium, and students are also rostered to cook hot lunches brought from home.

The roll reduced through the COVID-19 pandemic and the school officially closed on 30 August 2023 after the final students moved to schools in Woodville.

== Notable people ==
- Anna Leese, opera singer was a former student
- Rusty Greaves, country and western singer, was a former student
- Victor Lindauer, the son of portrait painter Gottfried Lindauer, taught at the school in the early 1920s after returning from a two-year stint in the United States. Under the influence of family friend William Colenso, he went on to become prominent in the study of algae.
