= Mangatainoka =

Locality in Manawatū-Whanganui, New Zealand

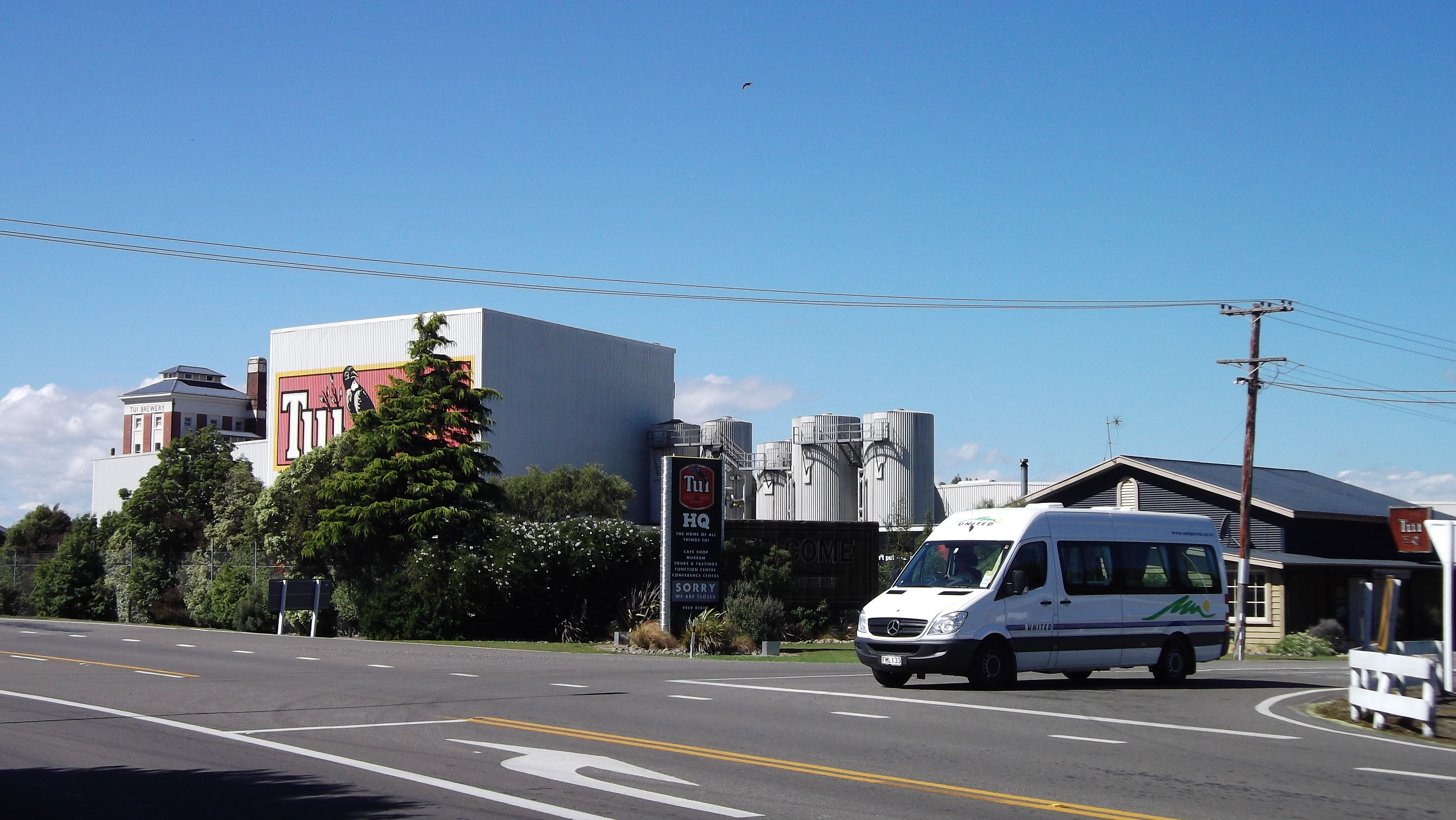
- Tui Brewery at Mangatainoka
- Interactive map of Mangatainoka
- Coordinates: 40.417°S 175.863°E
- Country: New Zealand
- Region: Manawatū-Whanganui
- Territorial authority: Tararua District
- Ward: South Tararua General Ward; Tamaki nui-a Rua Maori Ward
- Electorates: Wairarapa; Ikaroa-Rāwhiti (Māori)

Government
  - Territorial Authority: Tararua District Council
  - Regional council: Horizons Regional Council
  - Tararua Mayor: Scott Gilmore
  - Wairarapa MP: Mike Butterick
  - Ikaroa-Rāwhiti MP: Cushla Tangaere-Manuel

Area
  - Total: 52.64 km^{2} (20.32 sq mi)

Population (2023 Census)
  - Total: 411
  - Density: 7.81/km^{2} (20.2/sq mi)
- Time zone: UTC+12 (NZST)
  - Summer (DST): UTC+13 (NZDT)
- Postcode: 4973, 4971, 4970

Mangatainoka is a small settlement in the Tararua District of New Zealand's North Island. It is located on the banks of the Mangatainoka River, 5 km (3.1 mi) north of Pahiatua.

Mangatainoka is home to the Tui Brewery, which ceased brewing in 2021. It also has a golf course.

== Demographics ==
Mangatainoka locality covers 52.64 km^{2} (20.32 sq mi). It is part of the larger Mangatainoka statistical area.

Historical population for the locality
Year	Pop.	±% p.a.
2006	357	—
2013	369	+0.47%
2018	402	+1.73%
2023	411	+0.44%

Mangatainoka locality had a population of 411 in the 2023 New Zealand census, an increase of 9 people (2.2%) since the 2018 census, and an increase of 42 people (11.4%) since the 2013 census. There were 216 males and 195 females in 156 dwellings. 2.2% of people identified as LGBTIQ+. There were 81 people (19.7%) aged under 15 years, 45 (10.9%) aged 15 to 29, 213 (51.8%) aged 30 to 64, and 69 (16.8%) aged 65 or older.

People could identify as more than one ethnicity. The results were 90.5% European (Pākehā), 19.7% Māori, 2.2% Pasifika, 0.7% Asian, and 2.2% other, which includes people giving their ethnicity as "New Zealander". English was spoken by 98.5%, Māori by 4.4%, and other languages by 1.5%. No language could be spoken by 1.5% (e.g. too young to talk). New Zealand Sign Language was known by 0.7%. The percentage of people born overseas was 8.8, compared with 28.8% nationally.

Religious affiliations were 30.7% Christian, 1.5% Māori religious beliefs, and 0.7% New Age. People who answered that they had no religion were 58.4%, and 9.5% of people did not answer the census question.

Of those at least 15 years old, 48 (14.5%) people had a bachelor's or higher degree, 195 (59.1%) had a post-high school certificate or diploma, and 78 (23.6%) people exclusively held high school qualifications. 27 people (8.2%) earned over $100,000 compared to 12.1% nationally. The employment status of those at least 15 was 177 (53.6%) full-time, 51 (15.5%) part-time, and 6 (1.8%) unemployed.

=== Mangatainoka statistical area ===
Mangatainoka statistical area also includes Papatawa and surrounds but does not include Woodville and Pahiatua. It covers 498.81 km^{2} (192.59 sq mi) and had an estimated population of 1,940 as of June 2025, with a population density of 4 people per km^{2}.

Historical population for the statistical area
Year	Pop.	±% p.a.
2006	1,752	—
2013	1,749	−0.02%
2018	1,743	−0.07%
2023	1,893	+1.66%

Mangatainoka statistical area had a population of 1,893 in the 2023 New Zealand census, an increase of 150 people (8.6%) since the 2018 census, and an increase of 144 people (8.2%) since the 2013 census. There were 1,020 males, 867 females, and 3 people of other genders in 723 dwellings. 2.4% of people identified as LGBTIQ+. The median age was 43.4 years (compared with 38.1 years nationally). There were 369 people (19.5%) aged under 15 years, 279 (14.7%) aged 15 to 29, 930 (49.1%) aged 30 to 64, and 318 (16.8%) aged 65 or older.

People could identify as more than one ethnicity. The results were 90.5% European (Pākehā); 17.4% Māori; 1.4% Pasifika; 2.2% Asian; 0.3% Middle Eastern, Latin American and African New Zealanders (MELAA); and 4.1% other, which includes people giving their ethnicity as "New Zealander". English was spoken by 97.8%, Māori by 2.4%, Samoan by 0.2%, and other languages by 4.0%. No language could be spoken by 2.1% (e.g. too young to talk). New Zealand Sign Language was known by 0.8%. The percentage of people born overseas was 10.3, compared with 28.8% nationally.

Religious affiliations were 34.5% Christian, 0.2% Islam, 1.1% Māori religious beliefs, 0.2% Buddhist, 0.6% New Age, and 0.8% other religions. People who answered that they had no religion were 53.1%, and 10.1% of people did not answer the census question.

Of those at least 15 years old, 252 (16.5%) people had a bachelor's or higher degree, 894 (58.7%) had a post-high school certificate or diploma, and 375 (24.6%) people exclusively held high school qualifications. The median income was $41,000, compared with $41,500 nationally. 141 people (9.3%) earned over $100,000 compared to 12.1% nationally. The employment status of those at least 15 was 825 (54.1%) full-time, 240 (15.7%) part-time, and 33 (2.2%) unemployed.

In 2018, 7.2% worked in manufacturing, 6.0% worked in construction, 3.3% worked in hospitality, 3.6% worked in transport, 6.9% worked in education, and 8.1% worked in healthcare.

== Transportation ==
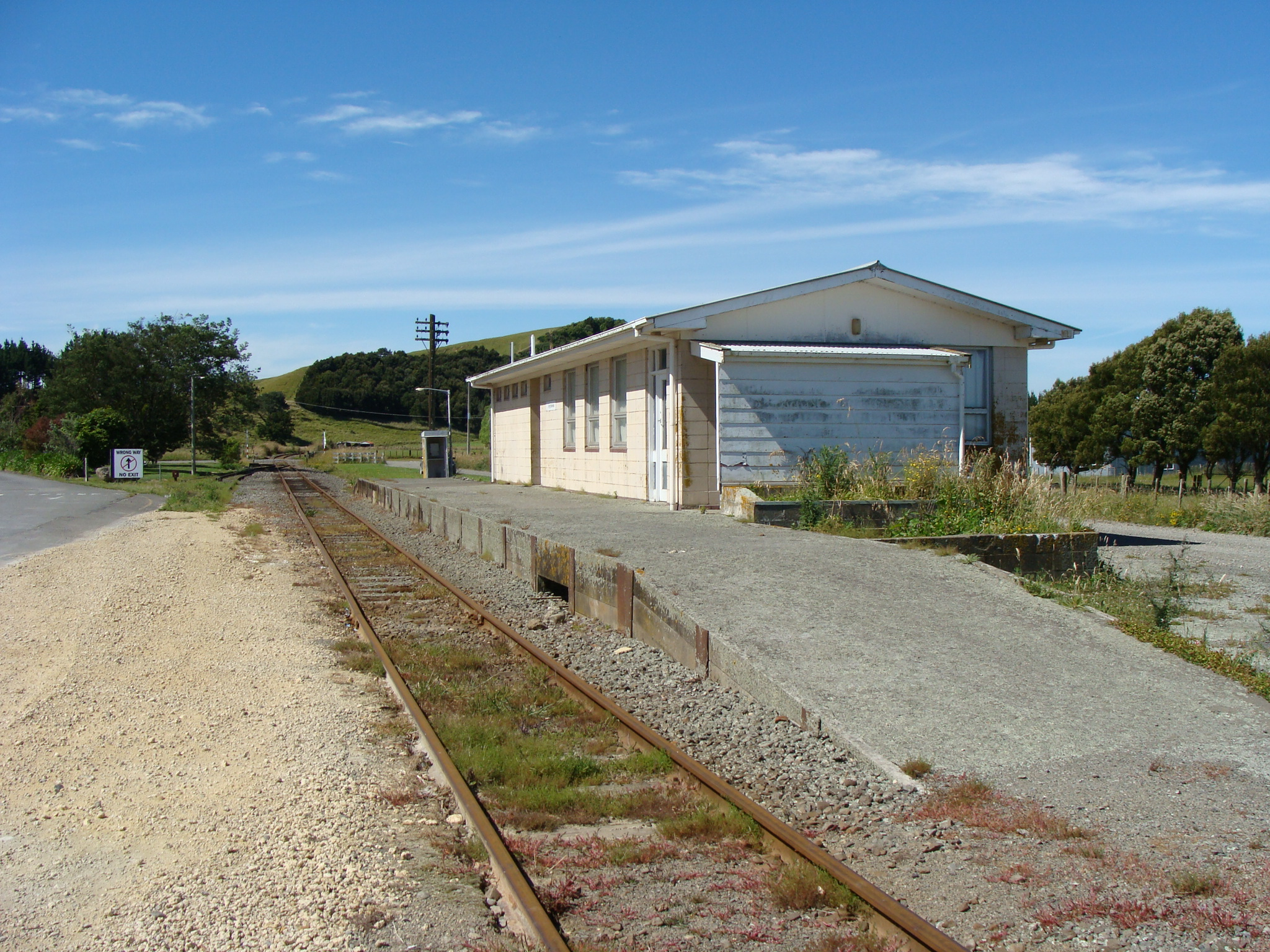
Mangatainoka railway station in 2008

As of 2018, among those who commute to work, 55.9% drove a car, 2.4% rode in a car, 0.6% use a bike, and 0.6% walk or run. No one commuted by public transport.

Mangatainoka railway station and railway line opened to Mangatainoka in August 1897 and the settlement was briefly the terminus of the Wairarapa Line until the final section to a junction with the Palmerston North–Gisborne Line in Woodville was opened on 11 December 1897. Passenger train services were originally provided by the Napier Express until it was re-routed via the former Wellington and Manawatu Railway Company's western line through the Kāpiti Coast and Horowhenua in early 1909.

It was replaced by the Wairarapa Mail, which served Mangatainoka until 1948, when it was fully replaced by the NZR RM Wairarapa class railcars that had begun operating some services in 1936. Standard and 88 seater class railcars also operated to Mangatainoka, especially after the Wairarapa railcars were withdrawn in the wake of the Rimutaka Incline's 1955 closure. Carriage trains through Mangatainoka were reintroduced in 1964 but did not fully replace the railcars until 1977.

As roads in the area improved through the 1980s, passenger numbers declined and all services north of Masterton ceased on 29 July 1988. Since this time, only freight trains have regularly operated through Mangatainoka; passenger services have been limited to occasional excursions, typically organised by enthusiast societies.

== Education ==
Mangatainoka School is a co-educational state primary school for Year 1–8 students, with a roll of 48 as of July 2026. It opened in 1889.
