= Mountain Rock Music Festival =

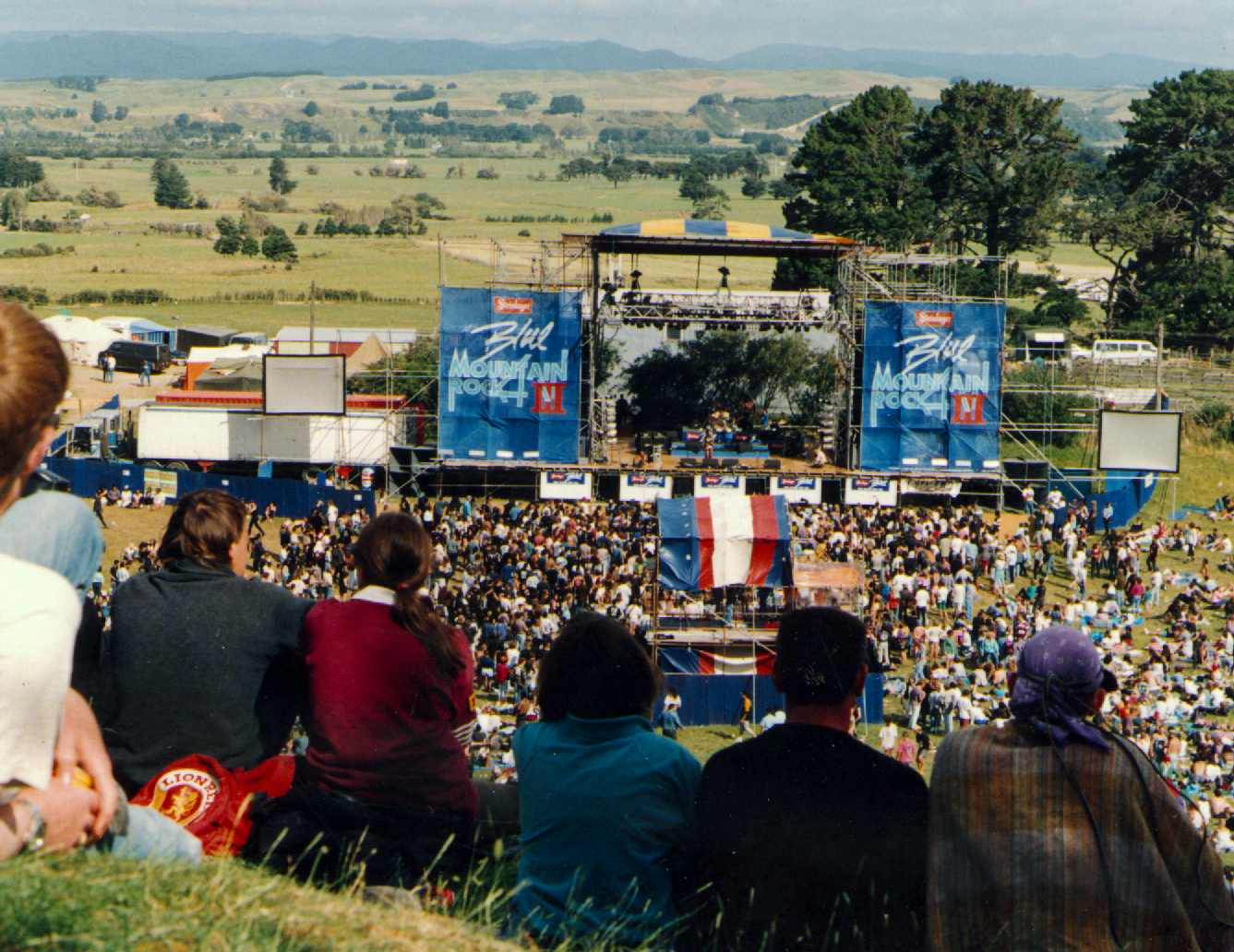
- Mountain Rock with Kevin Borich on stage
- Locations: Ballance near Woodville, later near Palmerston North
- Coordinates: 40.402243°S 175.801184°E
- Country: New Zealand
- Years active: 1992 to 1996
- Founders: Paul Geange and Paul Campbell

Mountain Rock Music Festivals, held on a farm near Woodville and later moved to a site near Palmerston North, were widely celebrated Kiwi music events in New Zealand during the 1990s. The event was created and promoted by Paul Geange and Paul Campbell, a Palmerston North Musician and founder of the infamous El Clubbo and the Palmerston North Musician's Society.

New Zealand's online encyclopaedia, Te Ara, notes that "There are regular jazz, folk, ethnic and country music awards and festivals, some of which have been in existence for decades. Large music festivals, for example Sweetwaters, Nambassa and The Big Day Out, have been staged periodically since the 1970s."

== Event years ==
- 1992 Mountain Rock Music Festival I
- 1993 Mountain Rock Music Festival II
- 1994 Mountain Rock Music Festival III
- 1995 Mountain Rock Music Festival IV
- 1996 Mountain Rock Music Festival V

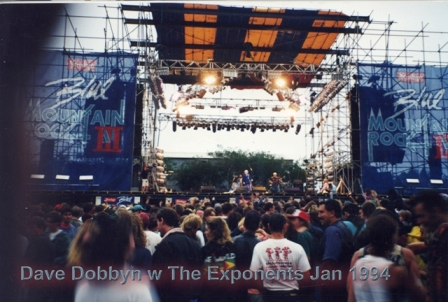
Dave Dobbyn with The Exponents, Mountain Rock III, 1994

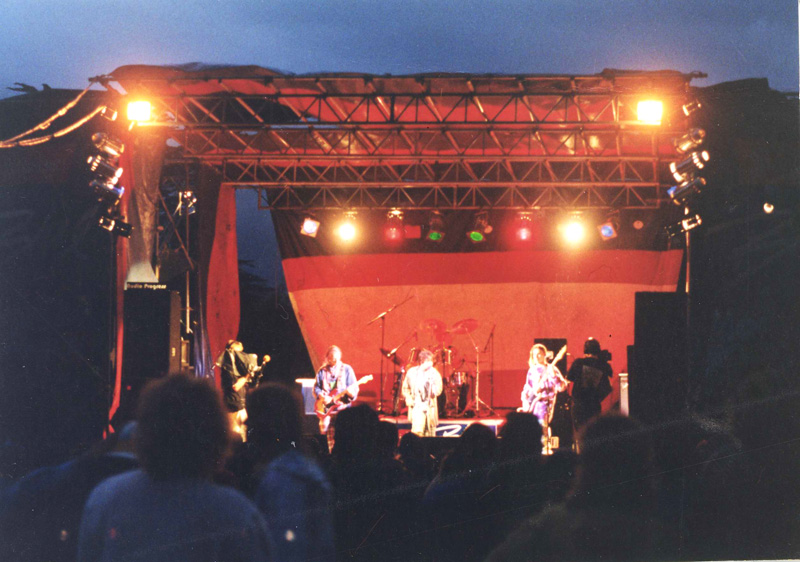
Idol Fret, Mountain Rock III, 1994

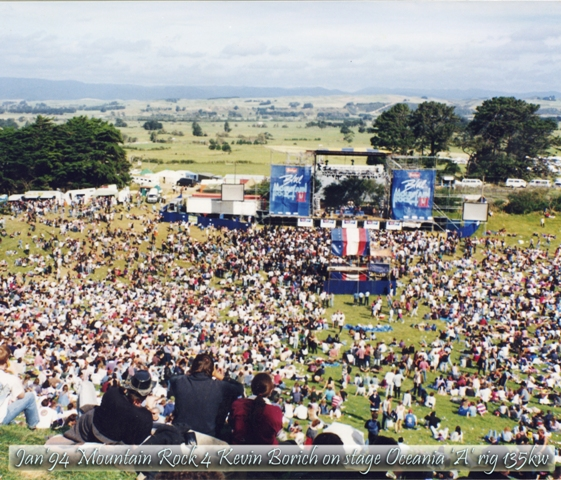
Mountain Rock IV, 1995

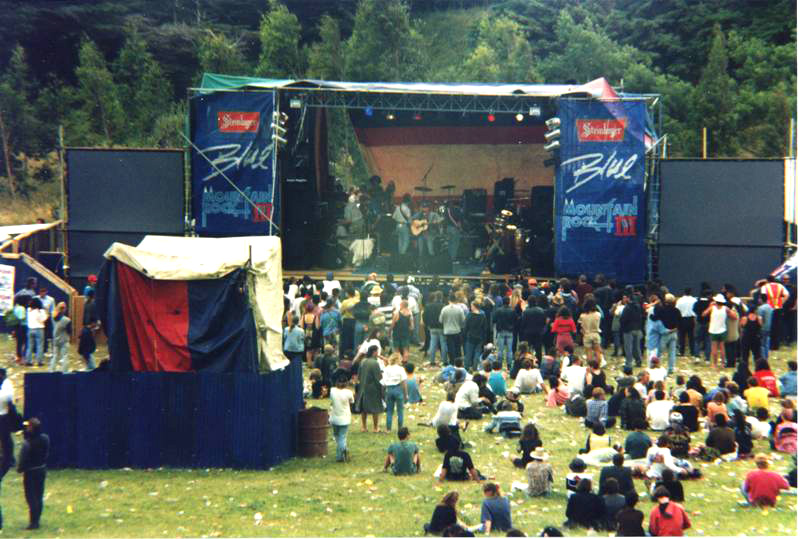
Mana, on stage with Lead Vocalist Carl Perkins (Herbs /House of Shem) and Spencer Fusimalohi (Herbs) Mountain Rock IV, 1995

== Musicians ==
Mountain Rock Music Festival III:

- Dragon
- Hello Sailor
- Southside of Bombay
- Supergroove
- Midnight Oil
- Shona Laing
- Dave Dobbyn
- Straitjacket Fits
- The Exponents
- Kevin Borich Express
- Shihad
- The Mutton Birds
- Jan Hellriegel
- Greg Johnson Set
- Desert Road
- Rick Bryant
- Bill Direen
- Wildfire
- Head Like a Hole
- Silent Scream
- Steve Cooke
- Mana
- Pacific Edge

== Film and television ==
The Maori Radio network broadcast Mountain Rock III live on air. On site, video and sound was recorded in the barn. Also, an independent film-maker from Auckland shot many hours on video and amateur video footage was also shot.
