= Peggy Koopman-Boyden =

New Zealand gerontologist (1943–2025)

Dame Peggy Koopman-Boyden DNZM
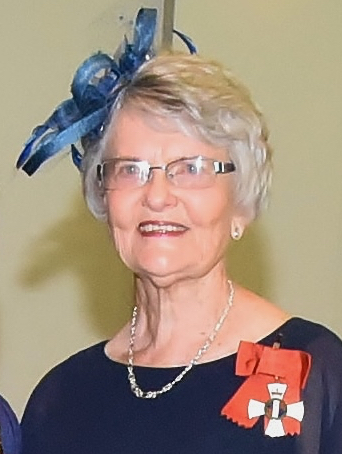
- Koopman-Boyden in 2017
- Born: Peggy Gwendoline Boyden; 16 August 1943; Dannevirke, New Zealand
- Died: 27 August 2025 (aged 82); Hamilton, New Zealand
- Education: Massey University
- Spouse: John Koopman (m. 1968)
- Scientific career
- Fields: Gerontology
- Workplaces: University of Waikato

Dame Peggy Gwendoline Koopman-Boyden DNZM (née Boyden; 16 August 1943 – 27 August 2025) was a New Zealand gerontologist. A professor of social gerontology at the University of Waikato, she was accorded the title of professor emeritus when she retired in 2016.

== Life and career ==
Born in Dannevirke on 16 August 1943, she received her primary school education at Ormondville before moving to Maharahara West, and then attended Dannevirke High School, where she was prefect. In 1964 she graduated with a teaching diploma from Palmerston North Teachers' College. On a trip to Asia she met John Koopman; they married in 1968 and went on to have two children.

She continued to teach while completing a BA from Massey University in 1968 followed by a master's degree in education and sociology in 1971. Her thesis was entitled Role consensus and job satisfaction in the educational organization.

== Honours and awards ==
In 1990, Koopman-Boyden was awarded the New Zealand 1990 Commemoration Medal. In the 1997 New Year Honours, she was appointed a Companion of the New Zealand Order of Merit, for services to the elderly, and she was promoted to Dame Companion of the New Zealand Order of Merit, for services to seniors, in the 2017 Queen's Birthday Honours.

Koopman-Boyden died at Waikato Hospital on 27 August 2025, at the age of 82.
