= Colin Loader =

New Zealand international rugby union player (1931–2021)

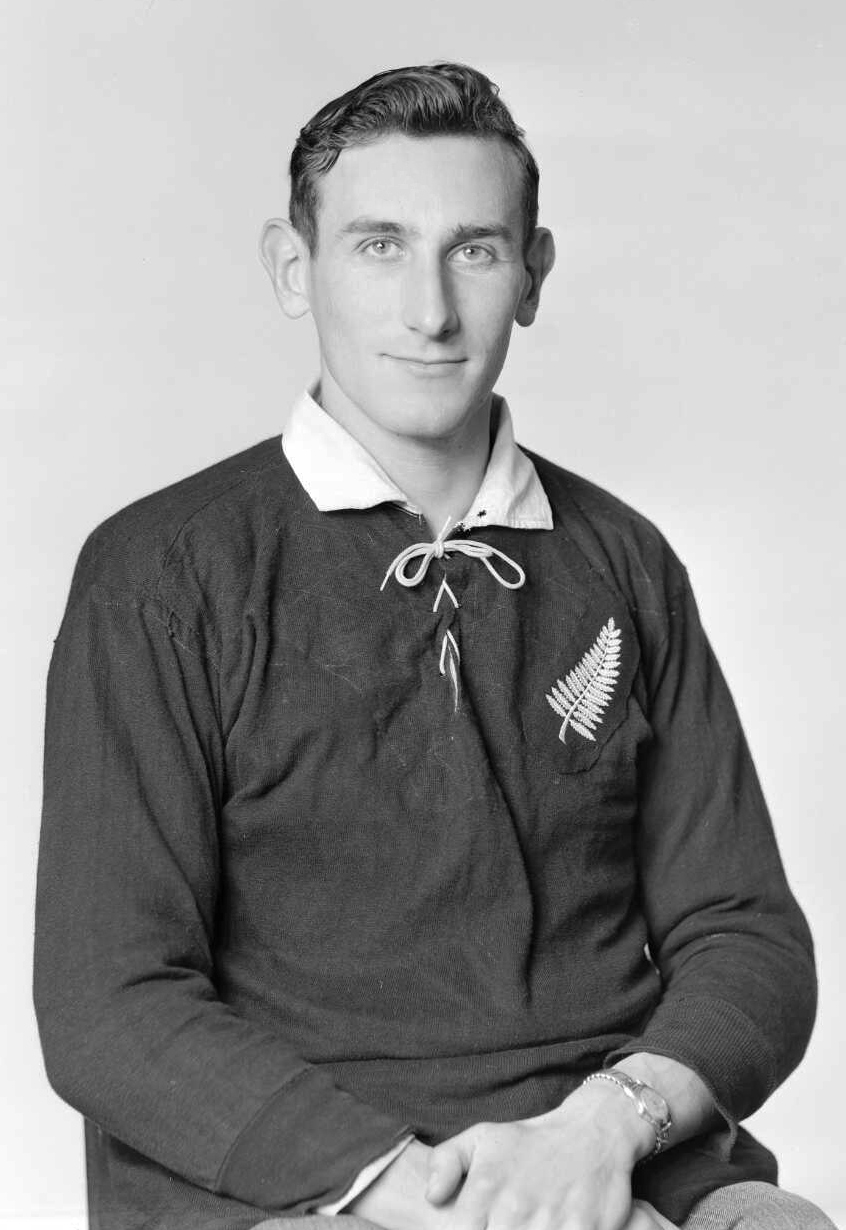
- Loader in 1953
- Born: Colin James Loader; 10 March 1931 Dannevirke, New Zealand
- Died: 19 June 2021 (aged 90) Dunedin, New Zealand
- Height: 1.78 m (5 ft 10 in)
- Weight: 71 kg (157 lb)
- School: Hutt Valley High School

Rugby union career
- Position: Second five-eighth. centre
Provincial / State sides
Years	Team	Apps	(Points)
1951–55	Wellington	21	
International career
Years	Team	Apps	(Points)
1953–54	New Zealand	4	(0)

Colin James Loader (10 March 1931 – 19 June 2021) was a New Zealand rugby union player who represented the All Blacks between 1953 and 1954.

Born in Dannevirke in 1931, Loader was educated at Hutt Valley High School, where he was a member of the 1st XV between 1948 and 1950. He first represented Wellington from the University club, but switched to the Hutt club in 1952.

A second five-eighth and centre three-quarter, Loader was selected for the 1953–54 All Black tour to the British Isles, France and North America. He played 16 matches on the tour, including four test matches, scoring three tries in all. He made his international debut in Dublin against Ireland on 9 January 1954. He played all four of his test matches at the centre three-quarter position. He did not play for the All Blacks again and retired from rugby at the end of the 1955 season. He later coached at the Hutt club.

Loader died in Dunedin on 19 June 2021.
