= Megan Larsen =

New Zealand businesswoman (born 1962)

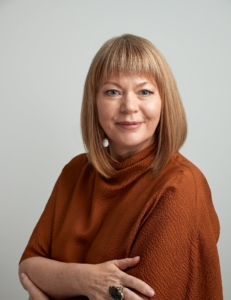
- Born: 1962 (age 63–64); Dannevirke, New Zealand
- Occupation: Businesswoman
- Website: www.meganlarsen.com.au

Megan Larsen is a natural and organic skin care entrepreneur and author. She is the founder of Sodashi, a natural skin care range, supplying more than 70 luxury spas in more than 25 countries.

== Early life ==
Larsen was born in Dannevirke, New Zealand in 1962 and grew up in Napier. She moved to Western Australia in her early 30s, and now resides in Sydney.

== Career ==
Larsen started her career working in a pharmacy, and then went on to study beauty therapy and natural healthcare. She completed an advanced diploma in aromatherapy in Provence. She also has a background in Ayurveda and Transcendental Meditation. Larsen started making her products in the early 1990s and founded Sodashi in 1999.

In 2016, Larsen was awarded the InStyle Award for Beauty.

In October 2018, Larsen published her first book Startups & Self-Care.
