= Roy White (rugby union) =

New Zealand rugby union player

- Born: Roy Maxwell White; 18 October 1917 Dannevirke, New Zealand
- Died: 19 January 1980 (aged 62) Wellington, New Zealand
- Height: 1.85 m (6 ft 1 in)
- Weight: 92 kg (203 lb)
- School: Hastings High School

Rugby union career
- Position: Flanker
Provincial / State sides
Years	Team	Apps	(Points)
1939–1948	Wellington	43	
International career
Years	Team	Apps	(Points)
1946–1947	New Zealand	4	(3)

Roy Maxwell White (18 October 1917 – 19 January 1980) was a New Zealand rugby union player. A flanker, White represented Wellington at a provincial level, and was a member of the New Zealand national side, the All Blacks, in 1946 and 1947. He played 10 matches for the All Blacks including four internationals.

He was selected as one of the 5 players of the year for the 1945 season in the Rugby Almananac of New Zealand.

He captained the All Blacks once, in a mid-week game against a New South Wales XV during the 1947 tour of Australia.
