= Foxton Beach =

Town in Manawatū-Whanganui, New Zealand

- Town
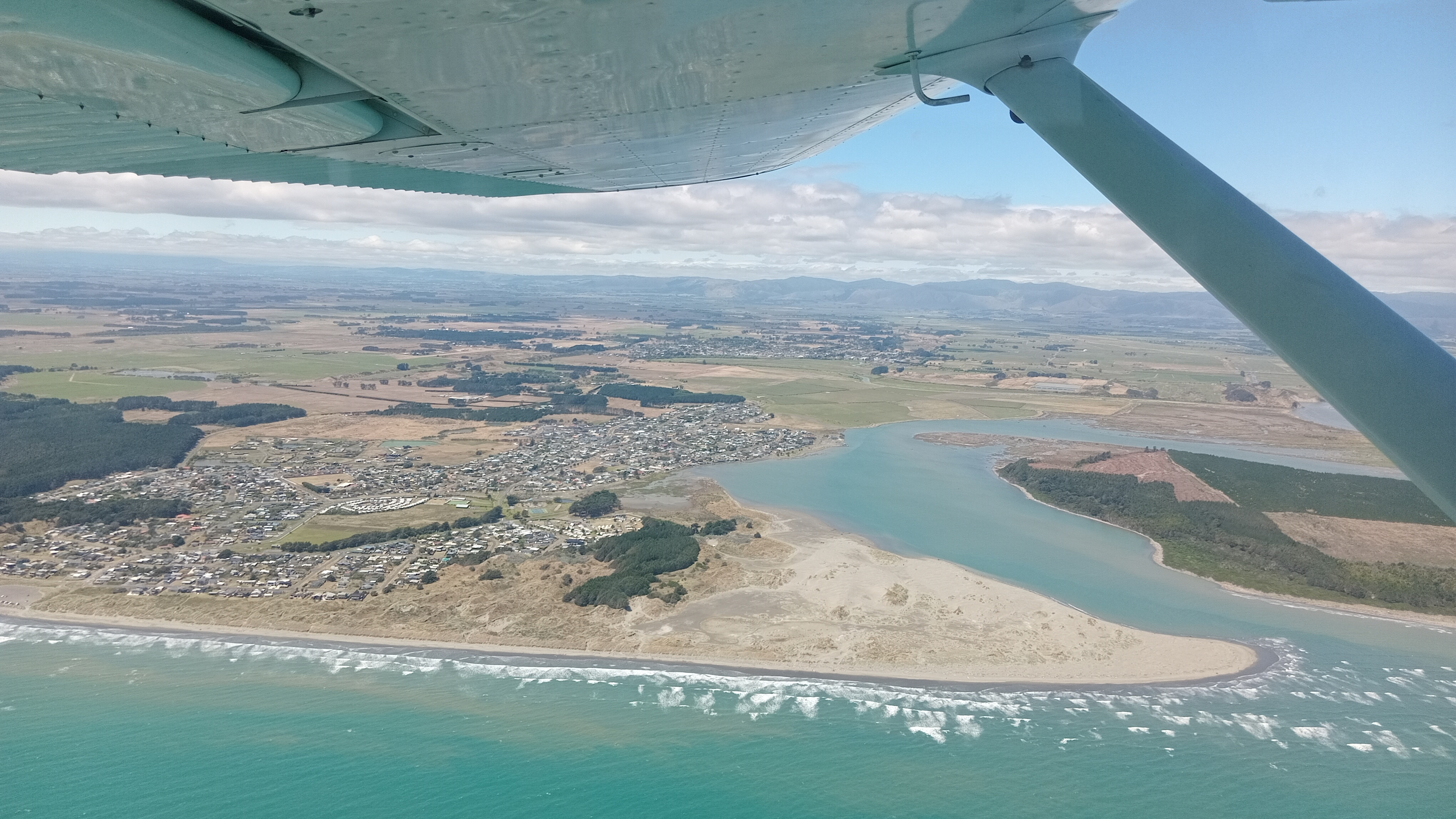
- Foxton beach and Manawatū River seen from a Cessna 152
- Interactive map of Foxton Beach
- Coordinates: 40°27′40″S 175°13′27″E
- Country: New Zealand
- Region: Manawatū-Whanganui region
- Territorial authority: Horowhenua District
- Ward: Kere Kere General Ward; Horowhenua Māori Ward
- Community: Te Awahou Foxton Community
- Named for: William Fox
- Electorates: Rangitīkei (electorate); Te Tai Hauāuru (Māori)

Government
  - Territorial Authority: Horowhenua District Council
  - Regional council: Horizons Regional Council
  - Horowhenua Mayor: Bernie Wanden
  - Rangitīkei MP: Suze Redmayne
  - Te Tai Hauāuru MP: Debbie Ngarewa-Packer

Area
  - Total: 2.64 km^{2} (1.02 sq mi)

Population (June 2025)
  - Total: 2,190
  - Density: 830/km^{2} (2,150/sq mi)
- Postal code: 4815
- Area code: 06

Foxton Beach is a small settlement in the Horowhenua District of the Manawatū-Whanganui region of New Zealand's North Island. It is located on the South Taranaki Bight at the mouth of the Manawatū River, 35 kilometres southwest of Palmerston North, and six kilometres west of Foxton. Foxton Beach has a permanent population of around 2000 people. The town is a popular holiday destination due mainly to its beach and the bird sanctuary at the Manawatū Estuary.

== History ==
Te Wharangi was a large Māori settlement at the location and a riverside fishing station where canoes could be tied up.

European settlement began in the 1840s, when it became a staging point for horsedrawn travel along the coast between Wellington and Whanganui. It later became a centre for export of flax and timber by steamer.

== Demographics ==
Foxton Beach is described by Statistics New Zealand as a small urban area, which covers 2.64 km^{2} (1.02 sq mi). It had an estimated population of 2,190 as of June 2025, with a population density of 829.55 people per km^{2}.

Historical population
Year	Pop.	±% p.a.
2006	1,701	—
2013	1,620	−0.69%
2018	1,884	+3.07%
2023	2,130	+2.48%

Foxton Beach had a population of 2,130 in the 2023 New Zealand census, an increase of 246 people (13.1%) since the 2018 census, and an increase of 510 people (31.5%) since the 2013 census. There were 1,062 males, 1,062 females, and 9 people of other genders in 948 dwellings. 2.8% of people identified as LGBTIQ+. The median age was 57.2 years (compared with 38.1 years nationally). There were 267 people (12.5%) aged under 15 years, 225 (10.6%) aged 15 to 29, 897 (42.1%) aged 30 to 64, and 741 (34.8%) aged 65 or older.

People could identify as more than one ethnicity. The results were 89.2% European (Pākehā); 20.7% Māori; 2.3% Pasifika; 1.4% Asian; 0.1% Middle Eastern, Latin American and African New Zealanders (MELAA); and 2.5% other, which includes people giving their ethnicity as "New Zealander". English was spoken by 98.2%, Māori by 4.1%, Samoan by 0.1%, and other languages by 3.2%. No language could be spoken by 1.3% (e.g. too young to talk). New Zealand Sign Language was known by 0.3%. The percentage of people born overseas was 9.6, compared with 28.8% nationally.

Religious affiliations were 27.9% Christian, 0.1% Hindu, 0.1% Islam, 1.0% Māori religious beliefs, 0.1% Buddhist, 0.7% New Age, and 1.0% other religions. People who answered that they had no religion were 59.4%, and 9.6% of people did not answer the census question.

Of those at least 15 years old, 249 (13.4%) people had a bachelor's or higher degree, 1,044 (56.0%) had a post-high school certificate or diploma, and 564 (30.3%) people exclusively held high school qualifications. The median income was $29,400, compared with $41,500 nationally. 105 people (5.6%) earned over $100,000 compared to 12.1% nationally. The employment status of those at least 15 was 693 (37.2%) full-time, 252 (13.5%) part-time, and 48 (2.6%) unemployed.

== Geography and nature ==
Foxton Beach is located on the Manawatū Estuary at the mouth of the Manawatū River. The style of houses built in new subdivisions indicate that the permanent population is growing.

The estuary is a Ramsar site and an internationally recognised bird sanctuary, where migrating and New Zealand native birds enjoy the mudflats and wetlands. It is a feeding spot for migrating godwits.

The council has built storm surge protection consisting of concrete barriers and small hill-like barriers with a path on top, which are connected to Sunset Walk, a riverside walkway.

== Recreation ==
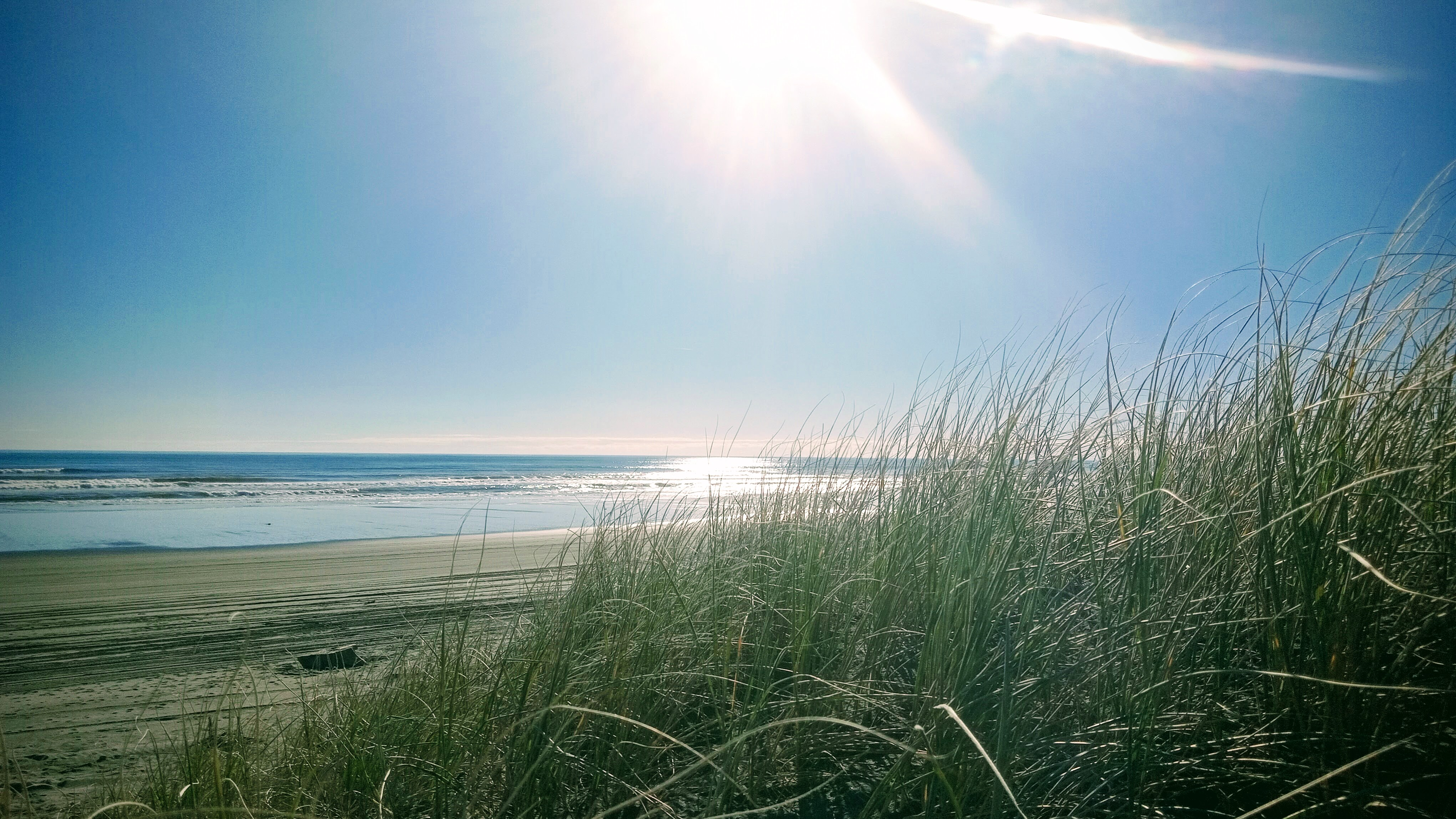
Foxton beach, Beach

The river has recreation opportunities such as bird watching, water skiing and fishing. Manawatu Marine Boating club is located at the Foxton Beach Wharf on the river. Holben / Te Wharangi Reserve has a playground, soundshell (stage) and skate park.

The beach is popular for swimming in summer and is patrolled by the Foxton Surf Life Saving Club.

== Education ==
Foxton Beach School is a coeducational state full primary school (years 1–8) with a roll of 105 (July 2026). It opened in 1951.

The nearest secondary school is Manawatū College in nearby Foxton.
