= Mangatainoka River (Tararua District) =

River in New Zealand

Coordinates: 40°24′S 175°53′E

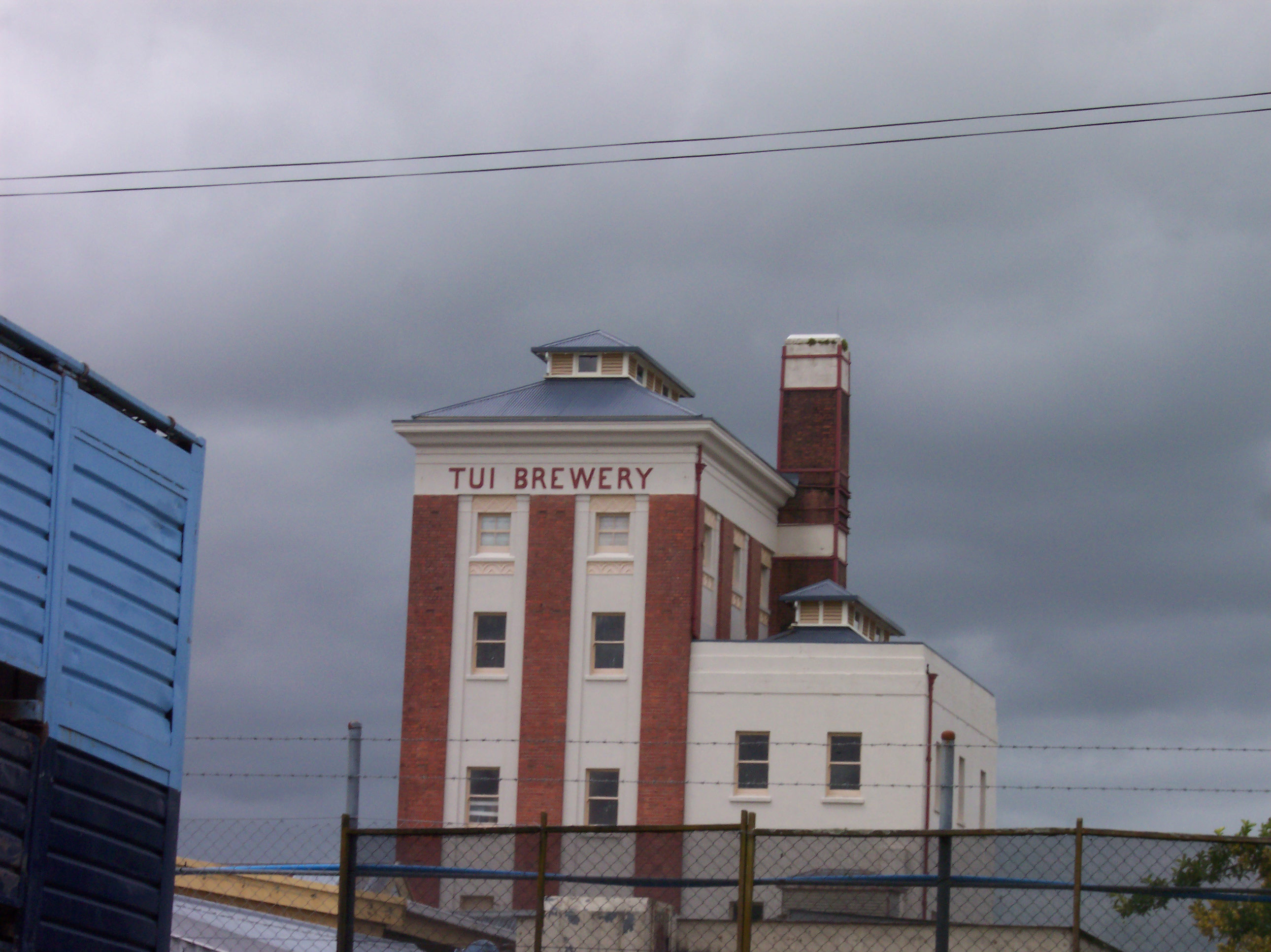
Tui Brewery Mangatainoka

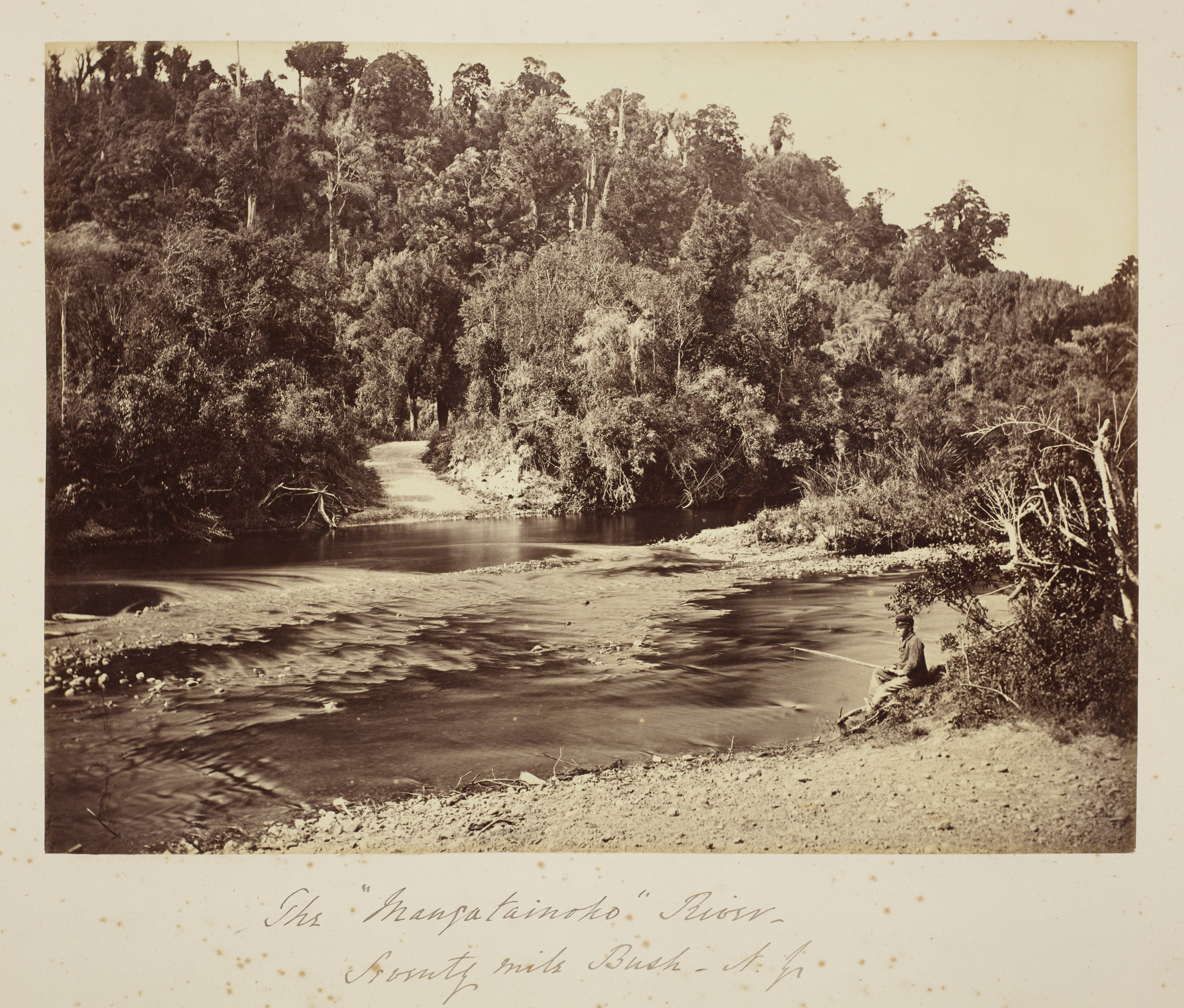
The Mangatainoka River within Seventy Mile Bush

The Mangatainoka River flows in the Tararua District of New Zealand's North Island. Its water was considered so pure a brewery, now the well-known Tui Brewery, was established there.

Its headwaters are on the eastern side of the Tararua Range to the southwest of the town of Eketāhuna, and it roughly parallels the Wairarapa Line railway and State Highway 2 through the Tararua District before meeting the Tiraumea River just before its confluence with the Manawatū River just south of Woodville. The railway's 162-metre (531 ft) bridge across the river between Newman and Hukanui is the longest on the entire line. Further north, the small settlement of Mangatainoka sits on the river's banks north of Pahiatua.

The name Mangatainoka is from the Māori language words manga, meaning stream, and tainoka, meaning Carmichaelia australis, a native broom plant.

Prior to European settlement of New Zealand, the shallow river was thickly lined with matai, rimu, and totara trees that prevented serious flooding to the swampy lands alongside the river. However, large-scale removal of the forest and drainage of the fertile land for agriculture has caused the river to flow faster, deepening its channel, heightening erosion, and encouraging it to meander to try to return to its slower pace. This has resulted in devastating floods, including one in October 2000 that caused at least NZ$200,000-300,000 of damage to the regional council's scheme to stabilise the river and rehabilitate its environment.

The river is popular for fishing, especially for trout. Approximately 50 kilometres (31 mi) of the river is fishable, and easily accessible, due to its proximity to State Highway 2 and major northern Wairarapa towns.
