= Dannevirke =

Town in Manawatū-Whanganui, New Zealand

Dannevirke Tāmaki-nui-a-Rua
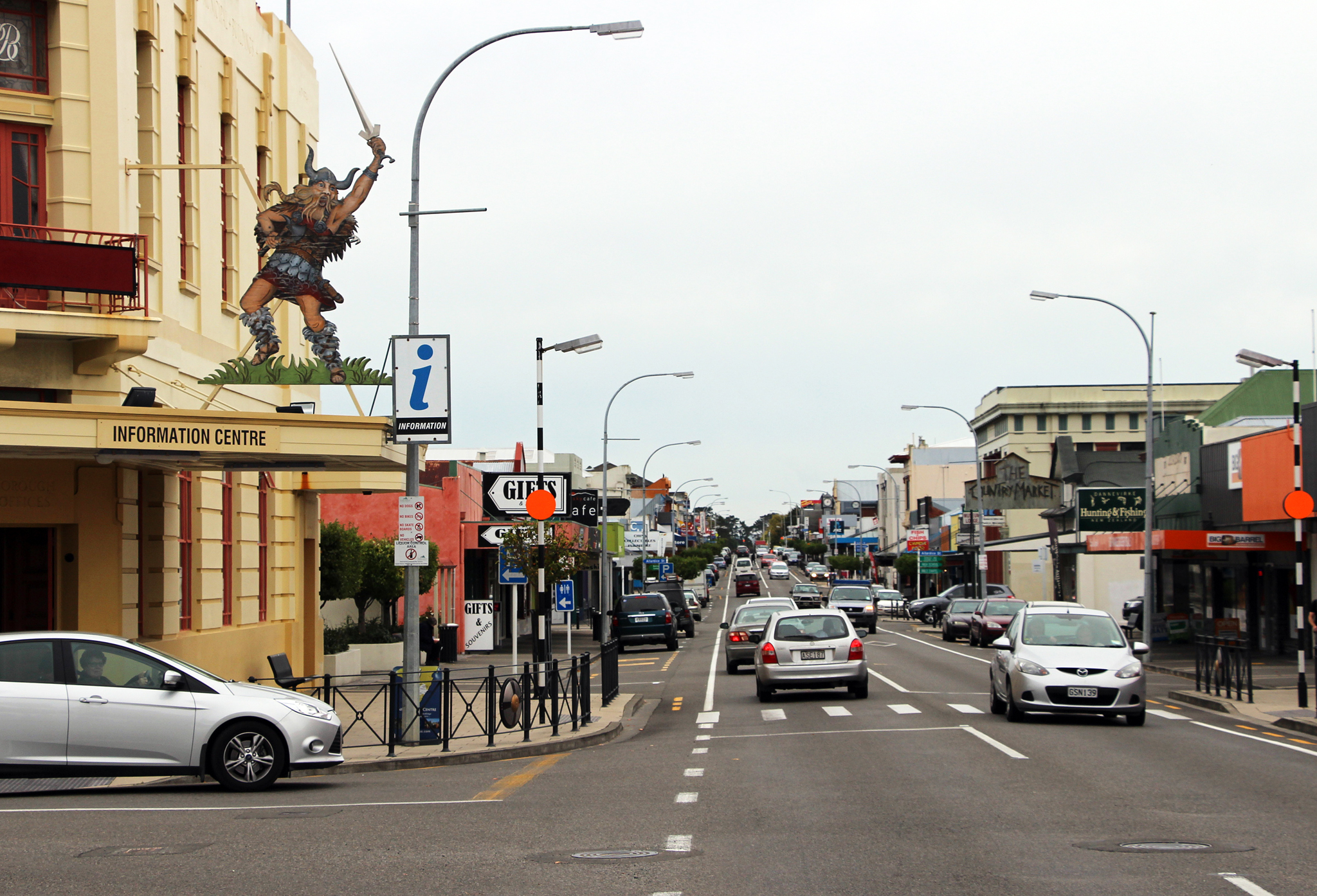
- Dannevirke High Street in May 2016
- Interactive map of Dannevirke
- Coordinates: 40°12′22″S 176°05′58″E
- Country: New Zealand
- Region: Manawatū-Whanganui
- Territorial authority: Tararua District
- Ward: North Tararua General Ward; Tamaki nui-a Rua Maori Ward
- Community: Dannevirke Community
- Electorates: Wairarapa; Ikaroa-Rāwhiti (Māori)

Government
  - Type: Territorial Authority
  - Body: Tararua District Council
  - Tararua Mayor: Scott Gilmore
  - Wairarapa MP: TBD
  - Ikaroa-Rāwhiti MP: Cushla Tangaere-Manuel
  - Regional council: Horizons Regional Council

Area
  - Total: 6.82 km^{2} (2.63 sq mi)

Population (June 2025)
  - Total: 5,640
  - Density: 827/km^{2} (2,140/sq mi)
- Postcode(s): 4930

Dannevirke (lit. "work of the Danes", a reference to Danevirke; Māori: Taniwaka or Tāmaki-nui-a-Rua, the area where the town is) is a rural service town in the Manawatū-Whanganui region of the North Island, New Zealand. It is the main centre of the Tararua District.

The surrounding area, a catchment and source of the Manawatū River (approximately 20 Min drive north of town) has developed into dairy, beef cattle and sheep farming, which now provides the major income for the town's population of 5,640.

== History ==
Before European settlers arrived in the 1870s, the line of descent for Māori in the area was from the Kurahaupō waka. The tribe of the area is Rangitāne, with geographic distinction to Te Rangiwhakaewa in the immediate Dannevirke region. The first known 'Aotea' meeting house was established approximately 15 generations ago (from 2010) followed by the building of a marae at Makirikiri near Dannevirke at about the same time as the first Nordic settlers arrived from Napier and Hawkes Bay.

The town was founded on 15 October 1872 by Danish, Norwegian and Swedish settlers, adherents of Scandinavism, who arrived at the port of Napier and moved inland. The settlers, who arrived under the Public Works Act, built their initial settlement in a clearing of the Seventy Mile Bush.

The Dannevirke after which the town was named is an extensive Viking Age fortification line in Denmark which had a strong emotive symbolic role for 19th-century Danes, especially after the site had fallen into German hands in the German-Danish War of 1864 – a recent and very painful event for these settlers. The settlement quickly earned the nickname of "sleeper town", as the town's purpose was to provide tōtara sleepers for the Napier–Wellington railway line, which had a station in the town from 1884. At one stage the area had 50 operating sawmills. After the native bush was cleared, the land was turned into pasture for grazing animals.

On 27 October 1917, much of the town's business district was destroyed by fire. The fire had started in the Andrew's Hotel on the corner of High and Station Streets at about 2pm. Flames blew across the road engulfing the Dannevirke Co-operative Association's store. As the fire spread through adjoining shops another hotel, the Masonic was engulfed. By about 5pm the Dannevirke and Woodville Fire Brigades, along with assistance from the local community had brought the fires under control. In total 27 business premises and 2 hotels were destroyed with damage estimated at £200,000.

== Demographics ==
Stats NZ describes Dannevirke as a small urban area, which covers 6.82 km^{2} (2.63 sq mi). It had an estimated population of 5,640 as of June 2025, with a population density of 827 people per km^{2}.

Historical population
Year	Pop.	±% p.a.
2006	5,559	—
2013	5,079	−1.28%
2018	5,505	+1.62%
2023	5,580	+0.27%

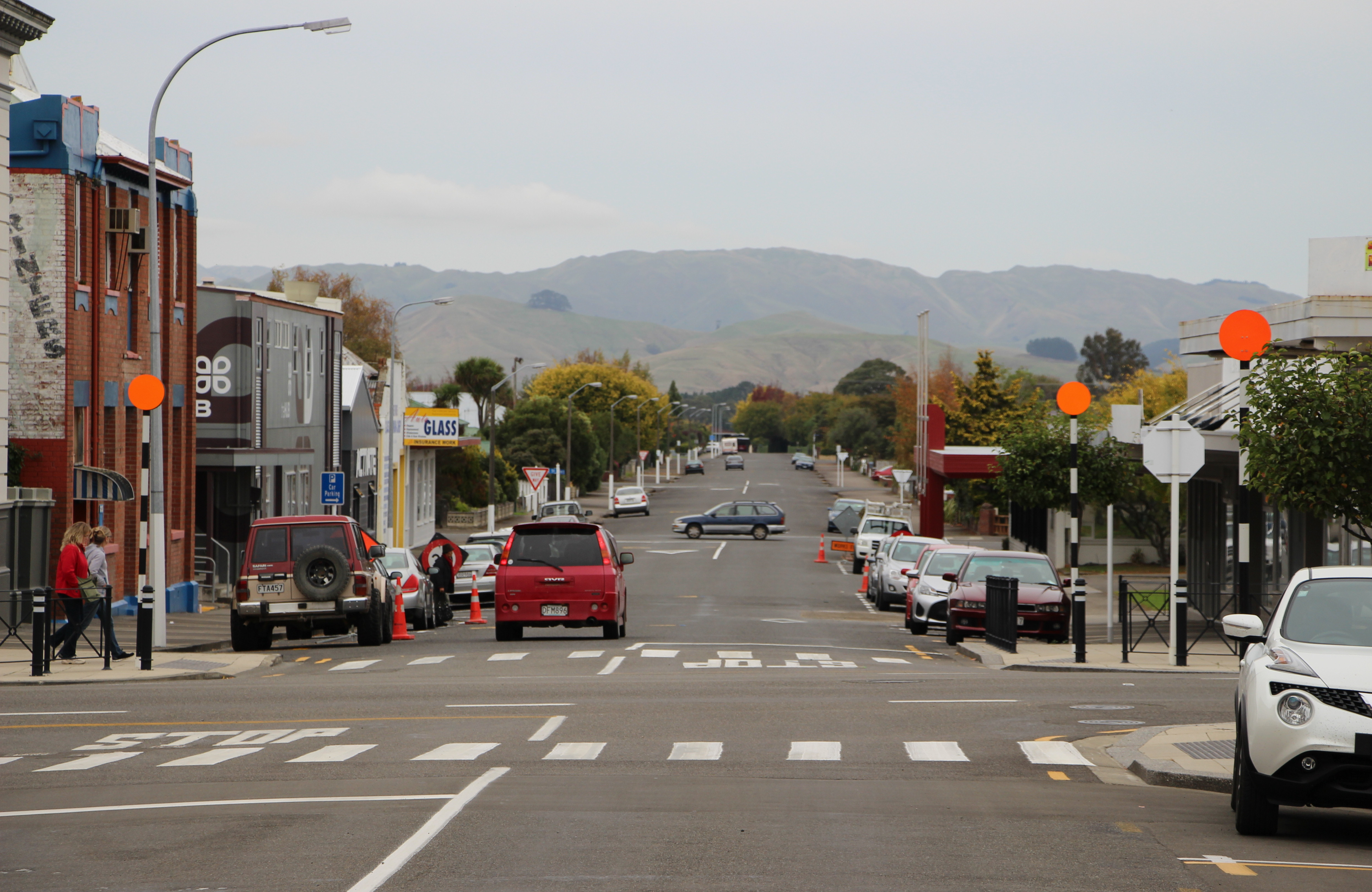
Gordon Street

Dannevirke had a population of 5,580 in the 2023 New Zealand census, an increase of 75 people (1.4%) since the 2018 census, and an increase of 501 people (9.9%) since the 2013 census. There were 2,697 males, 2,874 females, and 12 people of other genders in 2,283 dwellings. 2.2% of people identified as LGBTIQ+. The median age was 42.5 years (compared with 38.1 years nationally). There were 1,074 people (19.2%) aged under 15 years, 936 (16.8%) aged 15 to 29, 2,166 (38.8%) aged 30 to 64, and 1,404 (25.2%) aged 65 or older.

People could identify as more than one ethnicity. The results were 75.5% European (Pākehā); 34.8% Māori; 3.4% Pasifika; 5.1% Asian; 0.6% Middle Eastern, Latin American and African New Zealanders (MELAA); and 1.7% other, which includes people giving their ethnicity as "New Zealander". English was spoken by 97.3%, Māori by 7.3%, Samoan by 0.3%, and other languages by 4.7%. No language could be spoken by 1.7% (e.g. too young to talk). New Zealand Sign Language was known by 0.7%. The percentage of people born overseas was 11.0, compared with 28.8% nationally.

Religious affiliations were 32.5% Christian, 0.4% Hindu, 0.8% Islam, 5.4% Māori religious beliefs, 0.3% Buddhist, 0.5% New Age, and 0.6% other religions. People who answered that they had no religion were 51.0%, and 8.9% of people did not answer the census question.

Of those at least 15 years old, 423 (9.4%) people had a bachelor's or higher degree, 2,568 (57.0%) had a post-high school certificate or diploma, and 1,518 (33.7%) people exclusively held high school qualifications. The median income was $31,300, compared with $41,500 nationally. 141 people (3.1%) earned over $100,000 compared to 12.1% nationally. The employment status of those at least 15 was 1,875 (41.6%) full-time, 591 (13.1%) part-time, and 138 (3.1%) unemployed.

Individual statistical areas
Name	Area (km^{2})	Population	Density (per km^{2})	Dwellings	Median age	Median income
Dannevirke West	2.07	2,220	1,072	912	41.5 years	$35,000
Dannevirke East	4.74	3,360	709	1,371	43.0 years	$29,600
New Zealand					38.1 years	$41,500

The town's medical services and community hospital are operated by the Tararua Health Group.

=== Papatawa statistical area ===
Papatawa statistical area covers 230.05 km^{2} (88.82 sq mi) to the west of Dannevirke, but does not include Papatawa settlement. It had an estimated population of 1,450 as of June 2025, with a population density of 6.3 people per km^{2}.

Historical population for Papatawa statistical area
Year	Pop.	±% p.a.
2006	1,293	—
2013	1,326	+0.36%
2018	1,302	−0.36%
2023	1,401	+1.48%

Papatawa had a population of 1,401 in the 2023 New Zealand census, an increase of 99 people (7.6%) since the 2018 census, and an increase of 75 people (5.7%) since the 2013 census. There were 732 males and 666 females in 516 dwellings. 1.1% of people identified as LGBTIQ+. The median age was 44.6 years (compared with 38.1 years nationally). There were 276 people (19.7%) aged under 15 years, 207 (14.8%) aged 15 to 29, 648 (46.3%) aged 30 to 64, and 267 (19.1%) aged 65 or older.

People could identify as more than one ethnicity. The results were 85.0% European (Pākehā), 23.8% Māori, 1.5% Pasifika, 2.1% Asian, and 3.4% other, which includes people giving their ethnicity as "New Zealander". English was spoken by 98.3%, Māori by 6.2%, Samoan by 0.9%, and other languages by 3.4%. No language could be spoken by 1.3% (e.g. too young to talk). New Zealand Sign Language was known by 0.6%. The percentage of people born overseas was 9.4, compared with 28.8% nationally.

Religious affiliations were 33.8% Christian, 0.6% Hindu, 2.1% Māori religious beliefs, 0.4% New Age, 0.2% Jewish, and 1.7% other religions. People who answered that they had no religion were 51.0%, and 10.7% of people did not answer the census question.

Of those at least 15 years old, 141 (12.5%) people had a bachelor's or higher degree, 714 (63.5%) had a post-high school certificate or diploma, and 267 (23.7%) people exclusively held high school qualifications. The median income was $39,900, compared with $41,500 nationally. 129 people (11.5%) earned over $100,000 compared to 12.1% nationally. The employment status of those at least 15 was 600 (53.3%) full-time, 192 (17.1%) part-time, and 24 (2.1%) unemployed.

== Culture ==
Dannevirke has three marae (tribal meeting grounds) of the Rangitāne tribe and its hapū (sub-tribes); each marae has a wharenui (meeting house). Kaitoki marae is affiliated with the Ngāti Pakapaka and Ngāti Te Rangiwhakaewa hapū, and includes the Kaitoki Memorial Hall. Mākirikiri marae is affiliated with Ngāti Mutuahi and Ngāti Te Rangiwhakaewa hapū, and includes the Aotea Tuatoru wharenui. Whiti te Rā marae, also known as Poherau marae, is affiliated with Ngāti Mutuahi hapū, and includes Whiti te Rā wharenui.

== Sport ==
Dannevirke has produced a number of sports men and women in a number of different disciplines, among them rugby player John Timu, who made New Zealand teams in both union and league. Ewen Chatfield, who was an important member of the successful New Zealand cricket team of the 1980s Hadlee-Coney-Crowe era, is from Dannevirke, as is former All Black Duncan Hales, who now resides in the United States.

Other Dannevirke All Blacks were Colin Loader (1950s), Blair Furlong (1970 to South Africa), Lui Paewai who is widely acknowledged as the youngest All Black in history at just 17 years old (1924 Invincibles) and whose brother, nephews and grand-nephews (Doc, Hepa, Nathan and Murdoch respectively) went on to have good careers for Hawkes Bay and the New Zealand Maori side, and Roy White (post-war All Black in 1946 and 1947). Other All Blacks who spent time in Dannevirke included 1981 All Black tourist to Romania and France Wayne Neville, who attended Dannevirke High School, and John Ashworth, who moved from Canterbury to a farm near Dannevirke late in his career.

The Dannevirke Sports Club and Aotea Sports Club are the major outlets for sport in the town with netball, cricket and soccer teams as well as a rugby team that compete in the Premier Manawatu Senior Competition and the Hawke's Bay 1st Division.

== Climate ==
Dannevirke has an Oceanic climate, (Köppen:Cfb). Due its high altitude the summer temperatures are often cooler compared to other Eastern North Island towns, such as Masterton, Napier and Gisborne, while in winter Dannevirke can regularly experience frosts as in other parts of New Zealand. Snow is rare, the latest snow to hit Dannevirke was 13 July 2017

Climate data for Dannevirke (1991–2020 normals, extremes 1951–present)
Month	Jan	Feb	Mar	Apr	May	Jun	Jul	Aug	Sep	Oct	Nov	Dec	Year
Record high °C (°F)	31.5 (88.7)	33.1 (91.6)	31.2 (88.2)	27.0 (80.6)	24.1 (75.4)	21.2 (70.2)	21.0 (69.8)	20.7 (69.3)	24.1 (75.4)	25.1 (77.2)	29.5 (85.1)	29.9 (85.8)	33.1 (91.6)
Mean daily maximum °C (°F)	22.4 (72.3)	22.6 (72.7)	20.5 (68.9)	17.4 (63.3)	14.6 (58.3)	12.0 (53.6)	11.3 (52.3)	12.3 (54.1)	14.1 (57.4)	15.9 (60.6)	18.1 (64.6)	20.5 (68.9)	16.8 (62.3)
Daily mean °C (°F)	17.1 (62.8)	17.3 (63.1)	15.4 (59.7)	12.7 (54.9)	10.3 (50.5)	8.1 (46.6)	7.5 (45.5)	8.3 (46.9)	10.0 (50.0)	11.6 (52.9)	13.4 (56.1)	15.7 (60.3)	12.3 (54.1)
Mean daily minimum °C (°F)	11.9 (53.4)	12.0 (53.6)	10.2 (50.4)	8.0 (46.4)	6.1 (43.0)	4.2 (39.6)	3.6 (38.5)	4.3 (39.7)	5.8 (42.4)	7.4 (45.3)	8.7 (47.7)	10.9 (51.6)	7.8 (46.0)
Record low °C (°F)	0.8 (33.4)	1.1 (34.0)	−1.8 (28.8)	−2.7 (27.1)	−7.0 (19.4)	−5.7 (21.7)	−5.6 (21.9)	−5.8 (21.6)	−4.4 (24.1)	−4.4 (24.1)	−4.5 (23.9)	−1.0 (30.2)	−7.0 (19.4)
Average rainfall mm (inches)	80.8 (3.18)	69.9 (2.75)	73.0 (2.87)	87.1 (3.43)	77.6 (3.06)	98.0 (3.86)	99.9 (3.93)	78.0 (3.07)	90.7 (3.57)	101 (4.0)	91.3 (3.59)	78.8 (3.10)	1,026.1 (40.41)
Mean monthly sunshine hours	225.7	192.8	183.7	148.8	125.2	96.3	106.2	135.4	148.9	182.1	192.5	196.5	1,934.1
Source: NIWA

== Schools ==
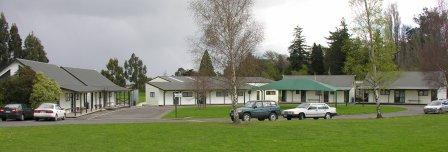
Totara College

Dannevirke High School is the town's state secondary school, with a roll of 415. The school opened in 1908, replacing the secondary department of Dannevirke South District High School, which had opened in 1903.

Dannevirke has three state full primary schools for years 1 to 8: Dannevirke South School, with a roll of 266, Huia Range School, with a roll of 219, and Ruahine School, with a roll of 172. Huia Ridge was established in 1873 as Dannevirke North School, and merged with Hillcrest School in 2003. It was renamed Huia Range School in 2005. Dannevirke South was established in 1900, because Dannevirke North had too large a roll. Ruahine School, about 10 km southwest of Dannevirke, was established in 1953 as a merger of three schools. Two more schools later merged into Ruahine, including Rua Roa School (established in 1908) in 2003. A previous Ruahine School, built in 1898, was extant in 1942.

St Joseph's School is a state-integrated Catholic primary school, with a roll of 125.

Te Kura Kaupapa Māori o Tamaki Nui A Rua is a Year 1–13 Māori language immersion school, with a roll of 81. It opened in 1992.

Totara College is a state-integrated Year 1–13 school with a Christian special character. The roll is 81. It opened in 1978 and moved to its current location in 1984. It became state-integrated in 1996.

All these schools are co-educational. Rolls are as of July 2026.

== Notable residents ==
- Sir William Ian Axford – Space Scientist
- Sir Joh Bjelke-Petersen – Australian politician and Premier of Queensland
- Victor Bleasdale – Brigadier General, US Marine Corps, awarded Navy Cross twice for heroism in World War 1
- Lyndon Buckingham, 22nd General of the Salvation Army
- Rangi Chase – Rugby league player, capped for England
- Ewen Chatfield – Test cricketer
- Peter Connell – Irish cricketer
- Peter Cullinane – Catholic Bishop of the Diocese of Palmerston North
- Lauris Edmond – poet
- Blair Furlong – international rugby player
- Bryan Gould – Rhodes Scholar, Deputy Leader of the British Labour Party, Dux of Dannevirke High School.
- Duncan Hales – international rugby player
- Aaron Hape – Fellow of the Royal Society of Arts
- Weller Hauraki – Rugby league player
- Jack Kerr – Test cricketer
- Charlotte Kight – Of Ākitio b. Dannevirke, Silver Fern Netballer.
- Dame Peggy Koopman-Boyden, Gerontologist
- Phil Lamason – World War II pilot
- Megan Larsen – organic skincare entrepreneur
- Colin Loader – international rugby player
- Sue McCauley – Playwright, author of 'Other Halves'
- Robin Maconie – composer, pianist, and writer
- Clint Newland – Rugby union player
- W. H. Oliver – historian and poet
- Lui Paewai – international rugby player, youngest All Black ever
- Murray Parker – test and one-day cricketer
- Bill Phillips – New Zealand and Australian economist, creator of the Phillips curve
- Sir Alfred Ransom (1868–1943), Mayor of Dannevirke (1910–1919) and Member of Parliament (1922–1943)
- Hans Madsen Ries (1860–1926), Mayor of Dannevirke (1903–1905, 1906–1910)
- Luke Ronchi – Dual international (Australia and New Zealand) T20, one-day and test cricketer
- Katrina Shanks – Politician, Member of Parliament
- John Timu – Dual rugby and rugby league international
- Joe Ward – Rugby union player
- Sonny Wool – Psychic sheep of the 2011 Rugby World Cup (b. Dannevirke)
