= Manawatū Estuary =

Estuary in Wellington Region, New Zealand

Manawatū River mouth and estuary
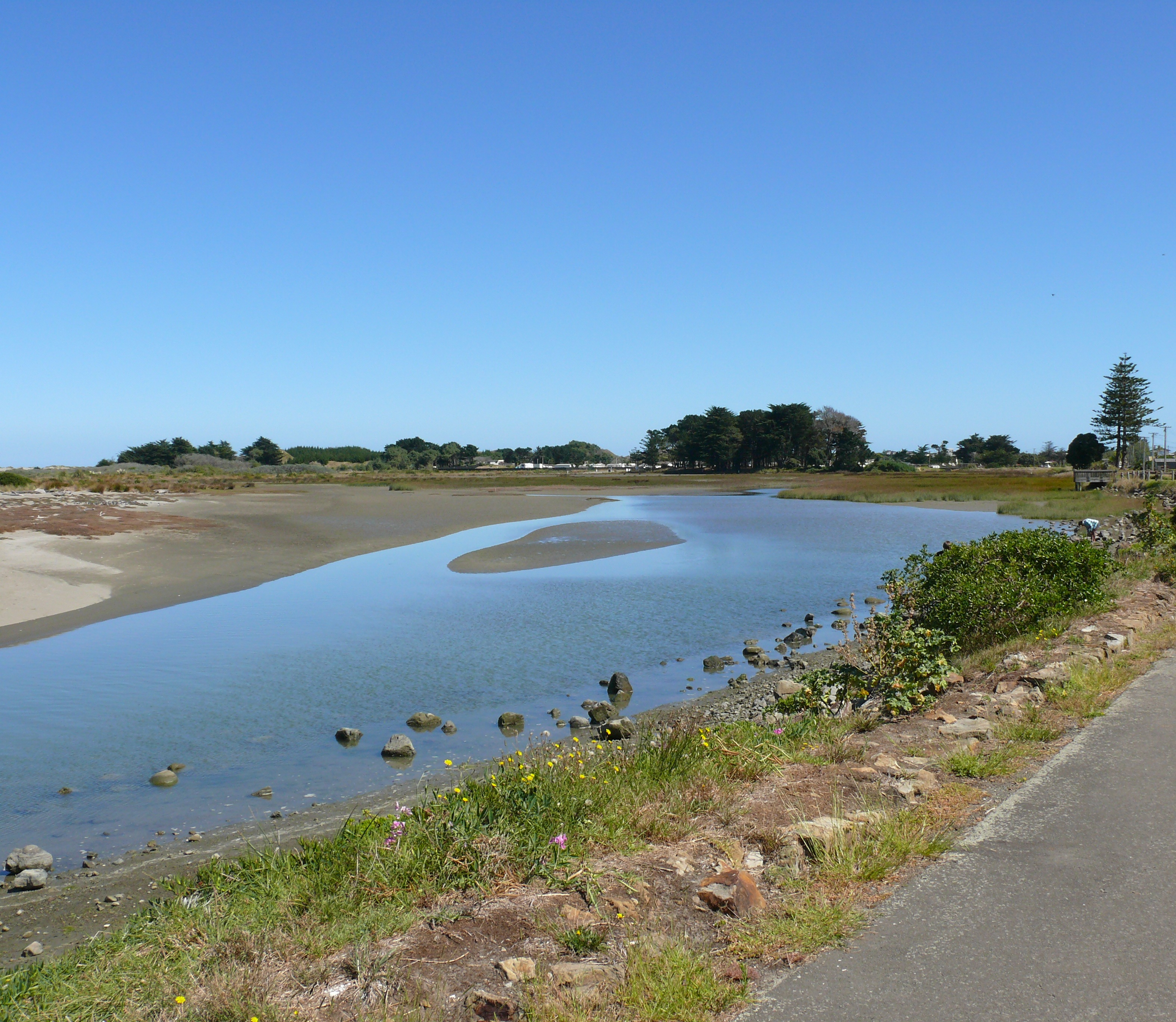
- Manawatū Estuary at Foxton Beach
- Interactive map of Manawatū River mouth and estuary
- Location: North Island, New Zealand
- Nearest city: Foxton Beach
- Coordinates: 40.4768489°S 175.2119703°E
- Area: 200 hectares (490 acres)

Ramsar Wetland
- Official name: Manawatu river mouth and estuary
- Designated: 25 July 2005
- Reference no.: 1491

The Manawatū Estuary is an estuary at the mouth of the Manawatū River, near Foxton Beach in the lower North Island of New Zealand. It is a wetland of international significance as one of seven Ramsar sites in New Zealand.

At approximately 250 hectares (620 acres), the Manawatū Estuary is the largest estuary in the lower North Island.

A total of 93 different bird species have been identified at the estuary. In 2005 the estuary attained Ramsar status.

During spring migratory birds arrive for the summer at the estuary, including the bar-tailed godwit, red knot, Pacific golden plover, Japanese snipe, wandering tattler and whimbrel.

== See also ==
- Wetlands of New Zealand
- Environment of New Zealand
