= Woodville, New Zealand =

Town in Manawatū-Whanganui, New Zealand

Woodville
- Town
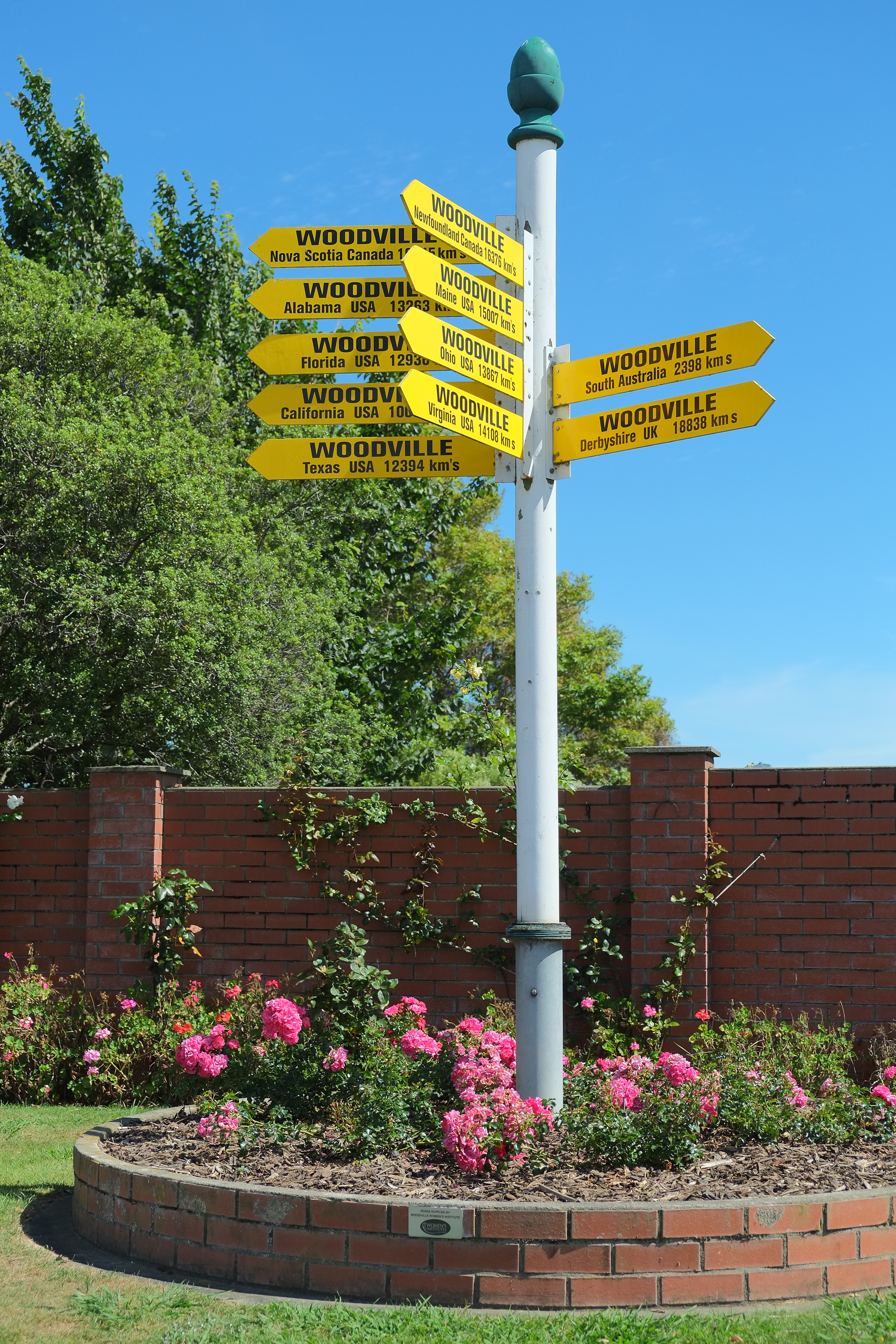
- Woodville fingerpost
- Interactive map of Woodville
- Coordinates: 40.3371°S 175.8667°E
- Country: New Zealand
- Region: Manawatū-Whanganui
- Territorial authority: Tararua District
- Ward: South Tararua General Ward; Tamaki nui-a Rua Maori Ward
- Electorates: Wairarapa; Ikaroa-Rāwhiti (Māori)

Government
  - Territorial Authority: Tararua District Council
  - Regional council: Horizons Regional Council
  - Tararua Mayor: Scott Gilmore
  - Wairarapa MP: Mike Butterick
  - Ikaroa-Rāwhiti MP: Cushla Tangaere-Manuel

Area
  - Total: 4.04 km^{2} (1.56 sq mi)
  - Land: 4.04 km^{2} (1.56 sq mi)
  - Water: 0 km^{2} (0 sq mi)

Population (June 2025)
  - Total: 1,680
  - Density: 416/km^{2} (1,080/sq mi)
- Time zone: UTC+12 (NZST)
  - Summer (DST): UTC+13 (NZDT)
- Postcode: 4920

Woodville, previously known as The Junction, is a small town in the southern North Island of New Zealand, 75 km north of Masterton and 25 km east of Palmerston North. The 2013 census showed that 1401 people reside in Woodville.

The town is in the Tararua District and the Manawatū-Whanganui region, although it has strong ties with the Hawke's Bay region, of which it was once a part, but is often considered to be the northern boundary of Wairarapa. It is within the catchment area of the Manawatū River.

== Geography ==
Woodville covers a land area of 4.04 km^{2}.

Only a few kilometres west of Woodville, the Manawatu River runs from east to west and cuts a deep gorge through the mountains, effectively slicing a mountain range in two. It is unusual geology as the river flows east towards the Pacific coast of the lower North Island, then cuts back west through the gorge and flows out into the Tasman Sea near Foxton.

Known by Māori as Te Āpiti, the gorge itself features in Māori mythology as the consequence of a show of strength by Okatia as he made his way to the sea. Hacked into the steep sides of the gorge on each side of the river are a road, now permanently closed, and a little-used railway. Since the indefinite closure of the Manawatū Gorge road, the Saddle Road and the Pahiatua Track now provide the easiest access between the east and west coasts of the southern North Island.

Once a vital route between Manawatū, Hawkes Bay and Wairarapa, geologic instability means the Manawatū Gorge road will never be re-opened. A new 4-lane road project was approved by the NZ Government in September 2019. Te Ahu a Turanga – Manawatū Tararua Highway was built between the existing Saddle Road and the Manawatū Gorge, connecting to SH2 west of Woodville. It opened to traffic on 11 June 2025.

== History ==
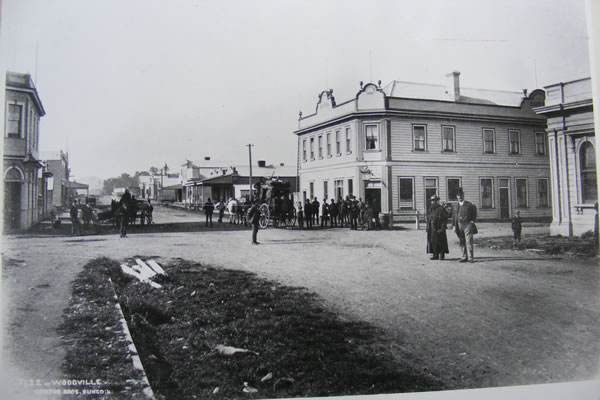
Woodville's main street in the 1890s

Woodville is at the northern end of the Tararua Range and the southern end of the Ruahines. In Māori history, it appears to have been a traveller's rest spot and a place for hunters to rest after they had walked from one side of the Manawatū Gorge to the other. The local iwi were Rangitāne, descended from Whatonga of the Kurahaupo canoe. They maintained strong and positive relations with other tribes for the most part.

One local landmark is Wharite, one of the main peaks in the Ruahine Ranges, a mountain range that runs northeast for 110 km from the Manawatū Gorge to the Kawekas, inland from Napier. The name for the 920m/3017 foot high mountain appears to be a corruption of the original name Wharetiti (Whare – house, titi – muttonbird (the Sooty Shearwater)). According to an interview on Radio Woodville in 2009, the peak gained its name when migrating muttonbird nested on top of the ridges of the Ruahine mountain range.

The birds arrived at Wharetiti from Bare Island, Waimarama and continued northwards to Tongariro. Local Māori would construct temporary housing when the titi began to arrive and would harvest the birds from their burrows, preserving them inside pouches made from bull kelp which they carried up from the coast. It is some years since muttonbirds were last seen in this part of the Ruahines.

In 1896 Thomas Fountaine, one of the early European settlers, donated land in Ormond St for a park. Fountaine Square is a Heritage New Zealand historic place. The band rotunda dates to 1897. In 2021 a plaque commemorating Fountaine was unveiled in the park.

== Government ==
Woodville was part of Hawke's Bay Province. Following the abolition of the provincial councils in 1876, it became part of Waipawa County, and on 24 December 1884, the Woodville Town Board was formed within the county. Woodville was constituted a borough in June 1887. In 1987, Woodville Borough merged with the neighbouring Woodville County to form Woodville District. As part of the 1989 local government reforms, Woodville District amalgamated with Dannevirke Borough, Eketahuna County, Pahiatua Borough, and Pahiatua County to form Tararua District.

=== List of mayors ===
During the 102 years of Woodville Borough and Woodville District Councils, Woodville had 19 mayors. The following is a complete list:

| | Name | Term of office |
|---|---|---|
| 1 | Joseph Sowry | 1887–1889 |
| 2 | Charles Hall | 1889–1890 |
| 3 | Hubert Burnett | 1891–1894 |
| 4 | Edward Alexander Haggen | 1895 |
| 5 | Edwin James Gothard | 1895–1898 |
| 6 | Joseph Motley | 1898–1901 |
| 7 | James Taylor | 1901–1902 |
| (3) | Hubert Burnett | 1903–1909 |
| 8 | David McKibbin | 1910 |
| 9 | William Crawford | 1911 |
| 10 | James Grant | 1912–1914 |
| 11 | Henry Horne | 1914–1931 |
| 12 | John Elder | 1932–1935 |
| (11) | Henry Horne | 1935–1938 |
| 13 | Robert Roy Johnston | 1938–1943 |
| 14 | Charles Forbes | 1943–1953 |
| 15 | Lionel Pilcher | 1953–1959 |
| 16 | Ernest Beale | 1959–1965 |
| 17 | Norman Henry Lanham | 1966–1977 |
| 18 | Edric Theodore Cheer | 1977–1986 |
| 19 | Ralph Mountfort | 1986–1989 |

== Demography ==
Stats NZ describes Woodville as a small urban area, which covers 4.04 km^{2} (1.56 sq mi). It had an estimated population of 1,680 as of June 2025, with a population density of 416 people per km^{2}.

Historical population
| Year | Pop. | ±% p.a. |
|---|---|---|
| 2006 | 1,401 | — |
| 2013 | 1,401 | +0.00% |
| 2018 | 1,548 | +2.02% |
| 2023 | 1,662 | +1.43% |

Woodville had a population of 1,662 in the 2023 New Zealand census, an increase of 114 people (7.4%) since the 2018 census, and an increase of 261 people (18.6%) since the 2013 census. There were 846 males, 810 females, and 6 people of other genders in 699 dwellings. 2.7% of people identified as LGBTIQ+. The median age was 45.2 years (compared with 38.1 years nationally). There were 309 people (18.6%) aged under 15 years, 264 (15.9%) aged 15 to 29, 726 (43.7%) aged 30 to 64, and 360 (21.7%) aged 65 or older.

People could identify as more than one ethnicity. The results were 83.8% European (Pākehā); 29.1% Māori; 3.6% Pasifika; 3.4% Asian; 0.5% Middle Eastern, Latin American and African New Zealanders (MELAA); and 2.9% other, which includes people giving their ethnicity as "New Zealander". English was spoken by 97.8%, Māori by 5.4%, Samoan by 0.2%, and other languages by 5.1%. No language could be spoken by 1.8% (e.g. too young to talk). New Zealand Sign Language was known by 0.9%. The percentage of people born overseas was 10.6, compared with 28.8% nationally.

Religious affiliations were 28.0% Christian, 0.4% Hindu, 0.2% Islam, 2.3% Māori religious beliefs, 0.2% Buddhist, 0.9% New Age, and 1.3% other religions. People who answered that they had no religion were 57.4%, and 9.9% of people did not answer the census question.

Of those at least 15 years old, 156 (11.5%) people had a bachelor's or higher degree, 753 (55.7%) had a post-high school certificate or diploma, and 450 (33.3%) people exclusively held high school qualifications. The median income was $29,100, compared with $41,500 nationally. 45 people (3.3%) earned over $100,000 compared to 12.1% nationally. The employment status of those at least 15 was 564 (41.7%) full-time, 153 (11.3%) part-time, and 63 (4.7%) unemployed.

== Economy ==
In 2018, 14.7% worked in manufacturing, 6.0% worked in construction, 5.5% worked in hospitality, 6.5% worked in transport, 7.8% worked in education, and 11.1% worked in healthcare.

Woodville's place in European migration history was established when it became the third of three sizeable timber milling towns in the 'Seventy Mile Bush' which extended along the eastern side of the Tararua Range and Ruahine Range. The others were Dannevirke and Pahiatua.

As farmland was settled and cleared, a number of small dairy factories were established to process the supply of milk for consumption as milk, cheese or other dairy products. As recently as the mid-1980s the dairy factory at the western end of Woodville, on State Highway 3 heading towards the Manawatū Gorge, operated a cheese processing line and a 'factory shop' selling dairy produce direct to the public. A thriving sheep and beef economy at one stage supported a number of local trucking firms and carriers, among them Gunn Transport and Hawkes Bay Farmers Transport, both of which were based at a site at the corner of State Highway 2/Vogel Street and Tay Street, which is the Wairarapa bypass. The site is now the offices for Horizons Regional Council. These haulage businesses were only economic in the pre-deregulated transport industry that existed prior to the Rogernomics reforms of the Lange Labour Government elected in 1984. With the lifting of distance restrictions (vehicles over a certain weight were at one stage restricted to travelling only 150 km from their geographic base) Woodville's role as a transport hub quickly fell away.

In addition, the local community sustained a supermarket (closed for a period in the 1980s, since re-opened as a Four Square) a Feltex fabrication factory, built in the mid-1970s and closed by the mid-1980s - at least four or five service station or garage outlets of which only one remains on the west side of the township, and a significant railway presence.

The advent of the Oringi Meatworks in 1980-81 was a boost to Woodville's economy as a consequence of significant wage inflows from Woodville people working at Oringi. Oringi's plant closed in 2008. Very little light industry has survived into the 21st century, and the local agricultural community is supported from Palmerston North, Pahiatua or Dannevirke. Milk from farms in the Woodville district was, until 2015, transported by rail from the Oringi Milk Transfer Station to Hawera for processing. It is now processed locally at the Fonterra plant in Pahiatua.

There has been a boost to the local economy with the construction and maintenance of the Te Āpiti Wind Farm on the ridges above the town. The foothills of the Ruahine and Tararua mountain ranges are to the west of Woodville. The lower ridges are now dotted with wind turbines making up New Zealand's largest wind farm, which was established in the early 2000s. The prevailing westerly winds in the Manawatu-Southern Hawkes Bay region provide a consistent Median Wind Velocity which is the key relevant measure for wind generation as a renewable energy source. Manawatu's flat pastoral lands and in particular the funnel effect created by the Manawatū Gorge, mean the area is well known for being subject to regular high winds.

Following detailed assessment and testing in the early 1990s, the decision was made by newly privatised electricity generation companies to site two large farms on the ridge-lines. The Te Āpiti Wind Farm is made up of 55 turbines, generating about 90 megawatts of electricity, enough to power about 30,000 homes. Dannevirke Power Board first connected Woodville to Mangahao hydro-electric power station in 1925.

== Transportation ==
As of 2018, among those who commute to work, 78.3% drove a car, 3.7% rode in a car, 0.9% use a bike, and 0.9% walked or run. No one commuted by public transport.

State Highway 3 through the gorge, on the southern Tararua side of the river, closed in 2017. It was replaced with a new state highway, Te Ahu a Turanga – Manawatū Tararua Highway, which opened to traffic on 11 June 2025.

The Palmerston North - Gisborne railway line runs along the northern bank of the river. At Woodville Railway Station, the Palmerston North - Gisborne Line meets the Wairarapa Line and a balloon loop - a rare example of railway engineering where trains reverse direction on a loop track built specifically for the purpose - permits through running via the Wairarapa to Wellington.

Due to low freight levels, the northern portion of the Wairarapa line was reviewed in 2010 as part of KiwiRail's turnaround plan. It remains a low traffic network. In some weeks there is only a single train on the line, running from Wellington to Napier. The use of the railway by Fonterra for bulk milk haulage from Oringi meant the Hawke's Bay line was sufficiently busy. Fonterra's Oringi milk transfer station was decommissioned in 2015-16.

== Culture ==
Te Ahu a Turanga i Mua marae is located on Tay Street. It is a tribal meeting ground of Rangitāne and its Ngāti Te Koro and Ngāti Te Rangiwhakaewa sub-tribe. It includes Te Ahu a Turanga i Mua meeting house.

One of New Zealand's first international hit songs, Blue Smoke was written by Ruru Karaitiana, who was born on a farm between Woodville and Dannevirke. Karaitiana served with the Māori Battalion in World War II and wrote and recorded the song on his return to New Zealand. It has been covered by other artists including Dean Martin.

Woodville was the original home of the Mountain Rock Music Festival, a celebration of New Zealand music growing to be the largest celebration of New Zealand music during the 1990s.

Artist Gottfried Lindauer is buried in the local Old Gorge Cemetery.

== Sport ==
Woodville has produced a number of well-regarded sporting competitors, particularly in the 1980s. Robert Collings Tennent formed the first rugby club in New Zealand when he lived in Nelson. Born in Rio de Janeiro, he moved with his family to New Zealand in the 1860s and was only 19 at the time he set up Nelson Rugby Club. He later moved north and was instrumental in forming more rugby clubs in Taranaki (Patea) and Manawatu. He also played first-class cricket in Nelson in the 1870s. Tennent later moved to Woodville and is buried in the Old Gorge Cemetery.

Woodville continues to host a successful horse-racing, rearing and training industry, based at the Woodville & Pahiatua Jockey Club's track on the north-east of the town.

Woodville has hosted the New Zealand MotoCross Grand Prix motorcycling races since 1961. Now widely regarded as New Zealand's premier motocross event, the Woodville Grand Prix is held in the height of summer in January each year. Held on the Cleghorn farm near the eastern entrance to the Manawatū Gorge, the honours board to 2011 features several well-known motorsport names, not least of whom is Ken Cleghorn (of the farm owning family) himself. Another notable early racer was Tim Gibbes of Palmerston North, who helped teach Hollywood actor Steve McQueen several stunts for The Great Escape.

== Education ==
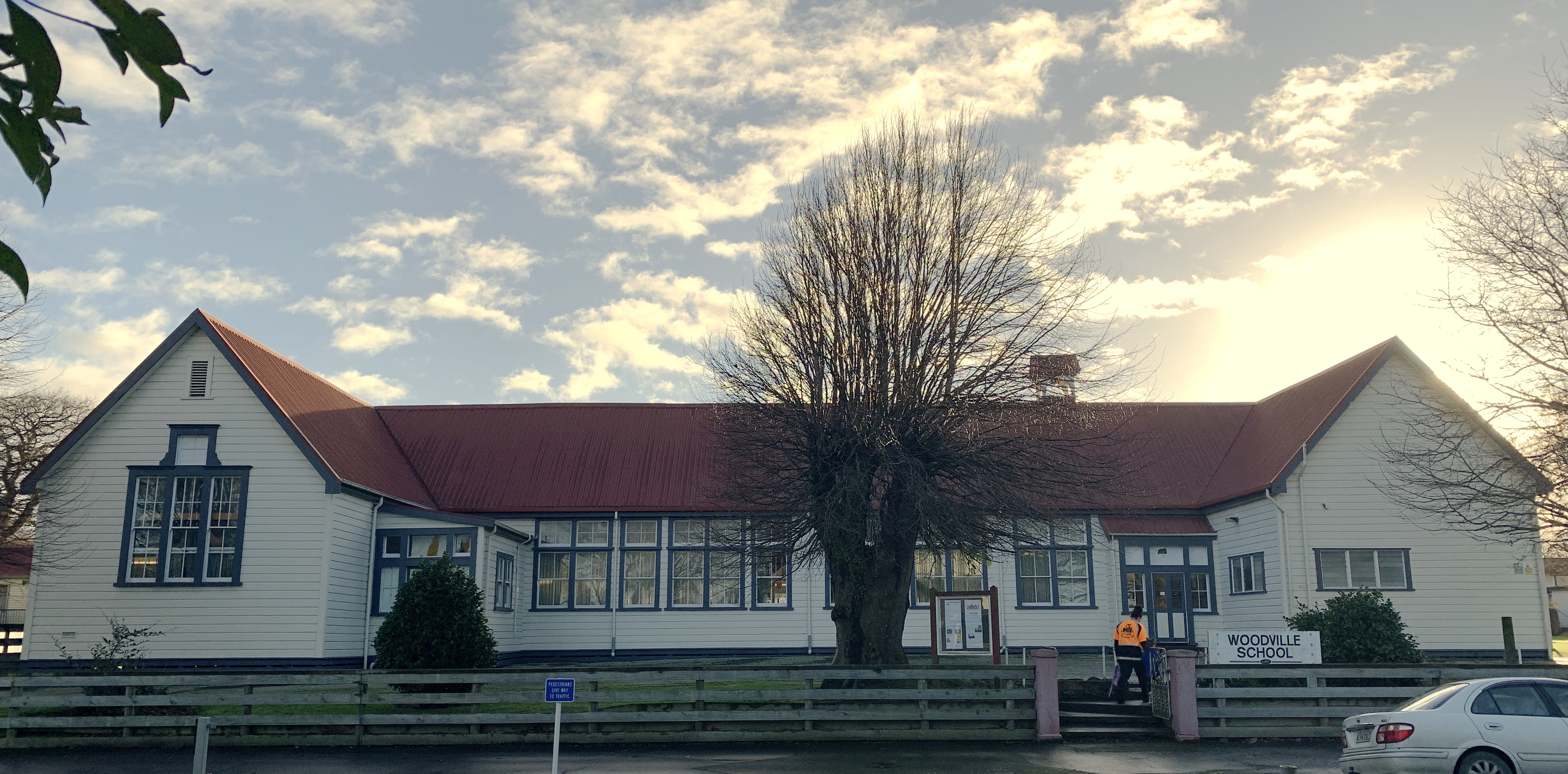
Woodville School

Woodville School is a co-educational state primary school for Year 1 to 8 students, with a roll of 121 as of July 2026. It opened in 1877.

== Climate ==
Climate data for Woodville (1951–1980)
| Month | Jan | Feb | Mar | Apr | May | Jun | Jul | Aug | Sep | Oct | Nov | Dec | Year |
|---|---|---|---|---|---|---|---|---|---|---|---|---|---|
| Mean daily maximum °C (°F) | 19.3 (66.7) | 20.0 (68.0) | 18.6 (65.5) | 15.7 (60.3) | 12.5 (54.5) | 10.2 (50.4) | 9.6 (49.3) | 10.5 (50.9) | 12.3 (54.1) | 14.0 (57.2) | 16.0 (60.8) | 17.9 (64.2) | 14.7 (58.5) |
| Daily mean °C (°F) | 15.5 (59.9) | 15.9 (60.6) | 14.8 (58.6) | 11.9 (53.4) | 9.6 (49.3) | 7.5 (45.5) | 6.6 (43.9) | 7.5 (45.5) | 8.9 (48.0) | 10.5 (50.9) | 12.5 (54.5) | 14.2 (57.6) | 11.3 (52.3) |
| Mean daily minimum °C (°F) | 11.7 (53.1) | 11.8 (53.2) | 11.0 (51.8) | 8.1 (46.6) | 6.6 (43.9) | 4.8 (40.6) | 3.6 (38.5) | 4.5 (40.1) | 5.5 (41.9) | 7.0 (44.6) | 9.0 (48.2) | 10.5 (50.9) | 7.8 (46.1) |
| Average rainfall mm (inches) | 93 (3.7) | 85 (3.3) | 96 (3.8) | 94 (3.7) | 104 (4.1) | 103 (4.1) | 104 (4.1) | 103 (4.1) | 85 (3.3) | 111 (4.4) | 96 (3.8) | 117 (4.6) | 1,191 (47) |
| Mean monthly sunshine hours | 209 | 189 | 174 | 122 | 113 | 82 | 89 | 115 | 116 | 147 | 200 | 200 | 1,756 |
Source: NIWA

== Notable people ==
- Rob Foreman, Manawatu provincial rugby player
- Dean Kenny, All Black and Otago provincial rugby player
- Atholstan Mahoney, All Black and Bush provincial rugby player
- Robbie McLean, All Black and Wairarapa Bush and Manawatu provincial rugby player
- Joe Schmidt, rugby and basketball player. Head coach of the Ireland & Australian rugby teams.
- Rob Thompson, All Black and provincial rugby player
