= Timeline of the COVID-19 pandemic in New Zealand (2021) =

This article documents the timeline of transmission of COVID-19 during the COVID-19 pandemic in New Zealand throughout 2021. The following dates and times are in New Zealand Daylight Time (UTC+13) until 3 April and New Zealand Standard Time (UTC+12) from 4 April.

On 14 February 2021, at 11:59 pm, Auckland moved up to alert level 3 and the rest of New Zealand to level 2 after new community cases were detected in Auckland during level 1. On 17 February at 11:59 pm, Auckland moved down to level 2 and the rest of the country to level 1. On 22 February at 11:59 pm, Auckland moved down to level 1. On 28 February at 6:00 am, Auckland moved back up to level 3 while the rest of New Zealand moved to level 2. On 7 March at 6:00 am, Auckland moved back to level 2 while the rest of New Zealand moved to level 1. On 12 March, Auckland moved back to level 1 at midday.

On 17 August 2021 at 11:59 pm, after a report of a new community case presumed to be infected with the Delta variant of the virus earlier that day, New Zealand moved to alert level 4, entering a nationwide lockdown for a minimum of three days.

On 1 September 2021, Auckland and the Northland Region remained on Alert Level 4 while the rest of the country transitioned into Alert Level 3 from 1 September 2021. On 8 September, all of New Zealand except Auckland moved into Alert Level 2 at 11:59pm on 7 September. However, mandatory mask wearing and limits on both indoor and outdoor gatherings of 50 and 100 people respectively were introduced. On 22 September, Auckland moved down to Alert Level 3 while the rest of the country remained on Alert Level 2. Event limit restrictions were also relaxed for areas under Level 2, with 100 people being allowed in indoor hospitality venues.

On 4 October, Alert Level three restrictions were reinstated in several parts of Waikato including Raglan, Huntly, Ngāruawāhia and Hamilton following the detection of community cases. On 7 October, Level 3 restrictions in the Waikato were extended to include a wider area including Te Kūiti, the Waipa District, Ōtorohanga, Te Awamutu, Karapiro and Cambridge. On 8 October, Alert Level 3 restrictions were reinstated in the Northland Region after a positive case from Auckland visited the region.

On 2 November, the Waikato region transitioned to step 2 of Alert Level 3. Step 2 allows retailers to operate with face masks and physical distance; increased the number of people at outdoor gatherings to 25; and eliminated the two-household restriction. On 10 November, Auckland transitioned to step 2 of Alert Level 3 from 10 November. As a result, retailers, museums, and zoos reopened while outdoor gatherings were allowed with a 23-person limit. The Far North District, which entered into a Level 3 lockdown the previous week, moved down to Alert Level 2 on 12 November.

On 3 December, New Zealand transitioned into the COVID-19 Protection Framework ("Traffic light system"), ending the previous "alert level system". Auckland and areas in the North Island with low vaccination started on the Red setting while the rest of the country commenced on the Orange setting. On 15 December, the Government lifted the internal border around Auckland, easing travel to and from the metropolitan region. On 31 December, most areas under the Red setting with the exception of the Northland Region transitioned to the Orange setting.

== Transmission timeline ==
Data about the previous day is extracted from the Institute of Environmental Science and Research's database at 9:00 am daily and is publicly released by the Ministry of Health around 1:00 pm. For most of January, data was released every three days instead.

=== January 2021 ===
| Date | Cases | | Recoveries | | Deaths | | Active cases | | | | Sources |
| Date | New | Total | New | Total | New | Total | Border | Community | Other | Total | Sources |
|---|---|---|---|---|---|---|---|---|---|---|---|
| 1 | - | - | - | - | - | - | - | - | - | - | No update |
| 2 | - | - | - | - | - | - | - | - | - | - | No update |
| 3 | 19 | 2,181 | 2 | 2,084 | 0 | 25 | 72 | 0 | 0 | 72 | |
| 4 | - | - | - | - | - | - | - | - | - | - | No update |
| 5 | 5 | 2,186 | 16 | 2,100 | 0 | 25 | 61 | 0 | 0 | 61 | |
| 6 | - | - | - | - | - | - | - | - | - | - | No update |
| 7 | 4 | 2,188 | 1 | 2,101 | 0 | 25 | 62 | 0 | 0 | 62 | |
| 8 | - | - | - | - | - | - | - | - | - | - | No update |
| 9 | - | - | - | - | - | - | - | - | - | - | No update |
| 10 | 31 | 2,219 | 18 | 2,119 | 0 | 25 | 75 | 0 | 0 | 75 | |
| 11 | 4 | 2,222 | 1 | 2,120 | 0 | 25 | 77 | 0 | 0 | 77 | |
| 12 | - | - | - | - | - | - | - | - | - | - | No update |
| 13 | 6 | 2,228 | 21 | 2,141 | 0 | 25 | 62 | 0 | 0 | 62 | |
| 14 | - | - | - | - | - | - | - | - | - | - | No update |
| 15 | 18 | 2,246 | 4 | 2,145 | 0 | 25 | 78 | 0 | 0 | 78 | |
| 16 | - | - | - | - | - | - | - | - | - | - | No update |
| 17 | 10 | 2,256 | 4 | 2,149 | 0 | 25 | 82 | 0 | 0 | 82 | |
| 18 | 6 | 2,262 | 3 | 2,152 | 0 | 25 | 85 | 0 | 0 | 85 | |
| 19 | - | - | - | - | - | - | - | - | - | - | No update |
| 20 | 6 | 2,267 | 14 | 2,166 | 0 | 25 | 76 | 0 | 0 | 76 | |
| 21 | - | - | - | - | - | - | - | - | - | - | No update |
| 22 | 9 | 2,276 | 12 | 2,178 | 0 | 25 | 73 | 0 | 0 | 73 | |
| 23 | - | - | - | - | - | - | - | - | - | - | No update |
| 24 | 8 | 2,284 | 1 | 2,179 | 0 | 25 | 79 | 0 | 0 | 79 | |
| 25 | 6 | 2,228 | 20 | 2,199 | 0 | 25 | 64 | 0 | 0 | 64 | |
| 26 | - | - | - | - | - | - | - | - | - | - | No update |
| 27 | 5 | 2,295 | 1 | 2,201 | 0 | 25 | 68 | 0 | 0 | 68 | |
| 28 | 5 | 2,299 | 4 | 2,205 | 0 | 25 | 67 | 2 | 0 | 69 | |
| 29 | 6 | 2,305 | 3 | 2,208 | 0 | 25 | 70 | 2 | 0 | 72 | |
| 30 | 1 | 2,303 | -1 | 2,207 | 0 | 25 | 69 | 2 | 0 | 71 | |
| 31 | 1 | 2,304 | 1 | 2,208 | 0 | 25 | 69 | 2 | 0 | 71 | |

On 3 January, six of the new 19 border cases had the mutant B.1.1.7 strain that originated in the United Kingdom.

On 6 January, a managed isolation worker with symptoms sparked a COVID-19 lockdown at the Hamilton District Court. The lockdown was lifted following two hours after the Ministry of Health confirmed that the worker had returned a negative test.

On 7 January, two of the four new border cases were linked to the British B.1.1.7 strain.

On 10 January, 19 of the 31 new cases had the B.1.1.7 strain from the United Kingdom, via the United Arab Emirates, Qatar or Singapore. In addition, New Zealand reported its first case of the South African 501.V2 variant. Eleven of the new cases were from a group of international mariners that arrived on 6 January.

On 15 January, two of the new 18 cases were historical while the others came from several countries including South Africa, the United Kingdom, the United States, Bahrain, Russia, the United Arab Emirates, Italy, India and Malaysia.

On 24 January, a new probable case in the community was reported in Northland. The individual had previously been through an Auckland quarantine facility. Later that night, the Director-General Ashley Bloomfield confirmed that the probable case in Northland was the country's first community transmission in two months. The individual was a 56-year-old woman who had returned from Europe and had completed a 14-day stay in managed isolation at Auckland's Pullman Hotel on 13 January.

On 25 January, the Director-General Bloomfield confirmed that the Northland community transmission patient had contracted the South African strain Lineage B.1.1.248. That same day, the Health Ministry released a list of 28 businesses in Auckland and Northland that the patient had visited in the period between 14 and 22 January. Health authorities also identified 15 close contacts of the patient including her husband and a hairdresser who tested negative.

On 27 January, the Health Ministry reported that the close contacts of the Northland community case had tested negative for the virus. That same day, the Health Ministry confirmed that two possible COVID-19 cases were being investigated in the Auckland community after testing positive. These two individuals had stayed at Auckland's Pullman Hotel, where the Northland community case had previously stayed.

On 28 January, health authorities confirmed that the two individuals from Pullman Hotel (an adult and a child), had tested positive, making them two new community transmissions.

On 29 January, the Health Ministry also announced that it would revert to issuing daily reports.

On 30 January, one previously reported case has now recovered while three cases reported previously have been reclassified as under investigation. The new case involves a person who arrived from the United States on 28 January. In addition, all close contacts of the border-related cases have tested negative.

=== February 2021 ===
| Date | Cases | | Recoveries | | Deaths | | Active cases | | | | Sources |
| Date | New | Total | New | Total | New | Total | Border | Community | Other | Total | Sources |
|---|---|---|---|---|---|---|---|---|---|---|---|
| 1 | -1 | 2,303 | 1 | 2,209 | 0 | 25 | 67 | 2 | 0 | 69 | |
| 2 | 4 | 2,307 | 1 | 2,210 | 0 | 25 | 70 | 2 | 0 | 72 | |
| 3 | 3 | 2,308 | 12 | 2,222 | 0 | 25 | 59 | 2 | 0 | 61 | |
| 4 | 6 | 2,313 | 6 | 2,228 | 0 | 25 | 58 | 2 | 0 | 60 | |
| 5 | 2 | 2,315 | 0 | 2,228 | 0 | 25 | 59 | 3 | 0 | 62 | |
| 6 | - | - | - | - | - | - | - | - | - | - | No update |
| 7 | 5 | 2,320 | 1 | 2,229 | 0 | 25 | 62 | 4 | 0 | 66 | |
| 8 | 0 | 2,320 | 0 | 2,229 | 0 | 25 | 62 | 4 | 0 | 66 | |
| 9 | 2 | 2,322 | 1 | 2,230 | 0 | 25 | 63 | 4 | 0 | 67 | |
| 10 | 3 | 2,324 | 10 | 2,240 | 0 | 25 | 58 | 1 | 0 | 59 | |
| 11 | 1 | 2,324 | 5 | 2,245 | 0 | 25 | 53 | 1 | 0 | 54 | |
| 12 | 2 | 2,326 | 12 | 2,257 | 0 | 25 | 43 | 1 | 0 | 44 | |
| 13 | 2 | 2,328 | 1 | 2,258 | 0 | 25 | 44 | 1 | 0 | 45 | |
| 14 | 3 | 2,330 | 0 | 2,258 | 0 | 25 | 44 | 3 | 0 | 47 | |
| 15 | 6 | 2,336 | 6 | 2,264 | 0 | 25 | 44 | 3 | 0 | 47 | |
| 16 | 0 | 2,337 | 1 | 2,265 | 1 | 26 | 43 | 3 | 0 | 46 | |
| 17 | 3 | 2,340 | 0 | 2,265 | 0 | 26 | 44 | 5 | 0 | 49 | |
| 18 | 4 | 2,344 | 7 | 2,272 | 0 | 26 | 40 | 6 | 0 | 46 | |
| 19 | 4 | 2,348 | 0 | 2,272 | 0 | 26 | 43 | 7 | 0 | 50 | |
| 20 | 2 | 2,350 | 1 | 2,273 | 0 | 26 | 44 | 7 | 0 | 51 | |
| 21 | 1 | 2,350 | 0 | 2,273 | 0 | 26 | 44 | 7 | 0 | 51 | |
| 22 | 7 | 2,357 | 4 | 2,277 | 0 | 26 | 46 | 8 | 0 | 54 | |
| 23 | 6 | 2,363 | 0 | 2,277 | 0 | 26 | 51 | 9 | 0 | 60 | |
| 24 | 2 | 2,365 | 0 | 2,277 | 0 | 26 | 51 | 11 | 0 | 62 | |
| 25 | 3 | 2,368 | 0 | 2,277 | 0 | 26 | 54 | 11 | 0 | 65 | |
| 26 | 3 | 2,371 | 1 | 2,278 | 0 | 26 | 56 | 11 | 0 | 67 | |
| 27 | 1 | 2,372 | 2 | 2,280 | 0 | 26 | 55 | 11 | 0 | 66 | |
| 28 | 4 | 2,376 | 5 | 2,285 | 0 | 26 | 54 | 11 | 0 | 65 | |

On 6 February, one new community transmission was reported in Hamilton, which was linked to the Pullman Hotel in Auckland. Director of Public Health Dr Caroline McElnay described the case as a recently returned asymptomatic case who had left the Pullman Hotel on 30 January.

On 7 February, two of the new cases originated via travel from Zambia and the United Arab Emirates. In addition, health authorities confirmed the Hamilton community transmission as the fifth community case reported in 2021.

On 13 February, the Health Ministry confirmed the death of a returning COVID-19 patient, who had died of a non-COVID-19 related illness at North Shore Hospital on 5 February. This patient was not included in the COVID-19 official death toll.

On 14 February, COVID-19 Response Minister Chris Hipkins identified the three community cases as three members of family (a mother, father, and daughter) from Papatoetoe, South Auckland. The mother worked at the airline catering service LSG Sky Chefs while the father worked as a tradesperson. The daughter was a Year 9 student at Papatoetoe High School. Two of the confirmed cases had visited New Plymouth on 6–7 February and also visited Pak'nSave supermarket chain's Manukau branch. The family was moved to Jetpark managed isolation and quarantine facility. Papatoetoe High School principal Vaughan Couillaut announced that the school would close on Monday and Tuesday. Five teachers and 28 students at the school were identified as close contacts of the infected student while all other students and staff at the school were considered "casual" contacts. In response to the new community cases in Auckland, Auckland moved to Alert level 3 at 11:59 pm, while the rest of New Zealand moved to Alert level 2.

On 17 February, the three new community cases included a pair of siblings who attended Papatoetoe High School and knew the student at the center of the city's latest community cluster. The third community case worked at the McDonald's restaurant in Cavendish Drive. That same day, Prime Minister Jacinda Ardern announced that Auckland's Level 3 lockdown would end at midnight since the minimal number of new community cases and wastewater testing suggested that the new community transmission was not "widespread." The rest of the country would go into Level 1. That same day, a sixth community case was reported with the individual being in the same household as the two siblings announced earlier today.

On 23 February, two new cases were reported and linked to the Papatoetoe High School cluster.

On 26 February, the media reported that a family member of a COVID-19 positive student from Papatoetoe High School had defied orders to isolate at home and went to work at the KFC in Botany Downs.

On 27 February, the older sibling of a Papatoetoe High School casual plus contact tested positive for COVID-19. As a result, the Government placed Auckland under an Alert Level 3 lockdown for the next seven days, with the rest of the country going back to Alert Level 2.

On the evening of 28 February, authorities confirmed a new case that was linked to the Auckland February cluster known as "Case O." Case O is a household contact of Cases I, J, K, and L.

=== March 2021 ===
| Date | Cases | | Recoveries | | Deaths | | Active cases | | | | Sources |
| Date | New | Total | New | Total | New | Total | Border | Community | Other | Total | Sources |
|---|---|---|---|---|---|---|---|---|---|---|---|
| 1 | 2 | 2,378 | 0 | 2,285 | 0 | 26 | 55 | 12 | 0 | 67 | |
| 2 | 4 | 2,382 | 2 | 2,287 | 0 | 26 | 59 | 10 | 0 | 69 | |
| 3 | 2 | 2,384 | 7 | 2,296 | 0 | 26 | 53 | 9 | 0 | 62 | |
| 4 | 6 | 2,389 | -1 | 2,295 | 0 | 26 | 59 | 9 | 0 | 68 | |
| 5 | 0 | 2,380 | 0 | 2,295 | 0 | 26 | 59 | 9 | 0 | 68 | |
| 6 | 9 | 2,398 | 6 | 2,301 | 0 | 26 | 67 | 4 | 0 | 71 | |
| 7 | 1 | 2,399 | 0 | 2,301 | 0 | 26 | 68 | 4 | 0 | 72 | |
| 8 | 6 | 2,405 | 0 | 2,301 | 0 | 26 | 74 | 4 | 0 | 78 | |
| 9 | 4 | 2,409 | 3 | 2,304 | 0 | 26 | 77 | 2 | 0 | 79 | |
| 10 | 1 | 2,410 | 0 | 2,304 | 0 | 26 | 78 | 2 | 0 | 80 | |
| 11 | 6 | 2,416 | 1 | 2,305 | 0 | 26 | 84 | 1 | 0 | 85 | |
| 12 | 1 | 2,417 | 0 | 2,305 | 0 | 26 | 85 | 1 | 0 | 86 | |
| 13 | 5 | 2,422 | 3 | 2,308 | 0 | 26 | 88 | 0 | 0 | 88 | |
| 14 | 1 | 2,423 | 2 | 2,310 | 0 | 26 | 87 | 0 | 0 | 87 | |
| 15 | 7 | 2,430 | 1 | 2,311 | 0 | 26 | 93 | 0 | 0 | 93 | |
| 16 | 2 | 2,432 | 0 | 2,311 | 0 | 26 | 95 | 0 | 0 | 95 | |
| 17 | 3 | 2,434 | 0 | 2,311 | 0 | 26 | 97 | 0 | 0 | 97 | |
| 18 | - | - | - | - | - | - | - | - | - | - | No update |
| 19 | 10 | 2,444 | 52 | 2,363 | 0 | 26 | 55 | 0 | 0 | 55 | |
| 20 | - | - | - | - | - | - | - | - | - | - | No update |
| 21 | 8 | 2,097 | - | - | 0 | 26 | 58 | 0 | 0 | 58 | |
| 22 | 9 | 2,462 | 4 | 2,373 | 0 | 26 | 63 | 0 | 0 | 63 | |
| 23 | 6 | 2,468 | 1 | 2,374 | 0 | 26 | 68 | 0 | 0 | 68 | |
| 24 | 3 | 2,470 | 3 | 2,377 | 0 | 26 | 67 | 0 | 0 | 67 | |
| 25 | 6 | 2,476 | 2 | 2,379 | 0 | 26 | 71 | 0 | 0 | 71 | |
| 26 | 3 | 2,479 | 0 | 2,379 | 0 | 26 | 74 | 0 | 0 | 74 | |
| 27 | 2 | 2,481 | 2 | 2,381 | 0 | 26 | 74 | 0 | 0 | 74 | |
| 28 | 1 | 2,482 | 0 | 2,381 | 0 | 26 | 75 | 0 | 0 | 75 | |
| 29 | 11 | 2,493 | 0 | 2,381 | 0 | 26 | 86 | 0 | 0 | 86 | |
| 30 | 2 | 2,495 | 8 | 2,389 | 0 | 26 | 80 | 0 | 0 | 80 | |
| 31 | 2 | 2,497 | 10 | 2,399 | 0 | 26 | 72 | 0 | 0 | 72 | |

On 5 March, Jacinda Ardern, the Prime Minister of New Zealand, announced that Auckland will move to Alert Level 2 lockdown from Alert Level 3, with the rest of New Zealand moving down to Alert Level 1, at 6am, on 7 March. The Ardern cabinet will review the alert level of Auckland at the start of the weekend coming after the downgrade to Level 2.

On 7 March, an Air New Zealand crew member who had returned from Japan was reported as a new border case.

On 22 March, a Managed Isolation and Quarantine (MIQ) worker at Auckland's Grand Millennium Hotel tested positive for COVID-19.

=== April 2021 ===
| Date | Cases | | Recoveries | | Deaths | | Active cases | | | | Sources |
| Date | New | Total | New | Total | New | Total | Border | Community | Other | Total | Sources |
|---|---|---|---|---|---|---|---|---|---|---|---|
| 1 | 5 | 2,501 | 9 | 2,408 | 0 | 26 | 67 | 0 | 0 | 67 | |
| 2 | - | - | - | - | - | - | - | - | - | - | No update |
| 3 | - | - | - | - | - | - | - | - | - | - | No update |
| 4 | 6 | 2,507 | 12 | 2,420 | 0 | 26 | 61 | 0 | 0 | 61 | |
| 5 | - | - | - | - | - | - | - | - | - | - | No update |
| 6 | 17 | 2,524 | 4 | 2,424 | 0 | 26 | 74 | 0 | 0 | 74 | |
| 7 | 7 | 2,531 | 0 | 2,424 | 0 | 26 | 81 | 0 | 0 | 81 | |
| 8 | 24 | 2,555 | 10 | 2,434 | 0 | 26 | 95 | 0 | 0 | 95 | |
| 9 | 6 | 2,561 | 6 | 2,440 | 0 | 26 | 95 | 0 | 0 | 25 | |
| 10 | 10 | 2,571 | 0 | 2,440 | 0 | 26 | 105 | 0 | 0 | 105 | |
| 11 | 3 | 2,574 | 0 | 2,440 | 0 | 26 | 108 | 0 | 0 | 108 | |
| 12 | 9 | 2,583 | 17 | 2,457 | 0 | 26 | 100 | 0 | 0 | 100 | |
| 13 | 4 | 2,587 | 2 | 2,459 | 0 | 26 | 102 | 0 | 0 | 102 | |
| 14 | 2 | 2,589 | 3 | 2,462 | 0 | 26 | 101 | 0 | 0 | 101 | |
| 15 | 2 | 2,591 | 2 | 2,464 | 0 | 26 | 101 | 0 | 0 | 101 | |
| 16 | 1 | 2,590 | 0 | 2,464 | 0 | 26 | 100 | 0 | 0 | 100 | |
| 17 | - | - | - | - | - | - | - | - | - | - | No update |
| 18 | 5 | 2,595 | 3 | 2,467 | 0 | 26 | 102 | 0 | 0 | 102 | |
| 19 | 2 | 2,596 | 1 | 2,468 | 0 | 26 | 102 | 0 | 0 | 102 | |
| 20 | 1 | 2,597 | 17 | 2,485 | 0 | 26 | 86 | 0 | 0 | 86 | |
| 21 | 2 | 2,599 | 5 | 2,490 | 0 | 26 | 83 | 0 | 0 | 83 | |
| 22 | 3 | 2,600 | 4 | 2,494 | 0 | 26 | 80 | 0 | 0 | 80 | |
| 23 | 0 | 2,600 | 48 | 2,542 | 0 | 26 | 32 | 0 | 0 | 32 | |
| 24 | 2 | 2,601 | 0 | 2,542 | 0 | 26 | 33 | 0 | 0 | 33 | |
| 25 | 0 | 2,601 | 0 | 2,542 | 0 | 26 | 33 | 0 | 0 | 33 | |
| 26 | - | - | - | - | - | - | - | - | - | - | No update |
| 27 | 8 | 2,609 | 5 | 2,547 | 0 | 26 | 36 | 0 | 0 | 36 | |
| 28 | 2 | 2,610 | 10 | 2,557 | 0 | 26 | 27 | 0 | 0 | 27 | |
| 29 | 3 | 2,613 | 7 | 2,564 | 0 | 26 | 23 | 0 | 0 | 23 | |
| 30 | 0 | 2,613 | 0 | 2,564 | 0 | 26 | 23 | 0 | 0 | 23 | |

On 8 April, the new cases included a Managed Isolation and Quarantine (MIQ) hotel worker at the Grand Millennium and 23 cases at the border.

On 11 April, a second MIQ worker at the Grand Millennium managed isolation facility in Auckland tested positive for COVID-19. The individual is a close contact of the case reported on 8 April. Later, it was reported that this worker had been last tested in November 2020.

On 16 April, it was reported that six Royal New Zealand Navy personnel and six family members assigned to the frigate HMNZS Te Mana had tested for COVID-19. At the time, the frigate was undergoing a major upgrade in Canada. The ship's crew and their families were staying at an accommodation block near the Royal Canadian Navy's base at Esquimalt.

On 20 April, a worker at Auckland Airport also tested positive for COVID-19, becoming the fourth border related cases in recent weeks.

=== May 2021 ===
| Date | Cases | | Recoveries | | Deaths | | Active cases | | | | Sources |
| Date | New | Total | New | Total | New | Total | Border | Community | Other | Total | Sources |
|---|---|---|---|---|---|---|---|---|---|---|---|
| 1 | - | - | - | - | - | - | - | - | - | - | No update |
| 2 | 1 | 2,618 | 4 | 2,568 | 0 | 26 | 24 | 0 | 0 | 24 | |
| 3 | 4 | 2,622 | 3 | 2,571 | 0 | 26 | 25 | 0 | 0 | 25 | |
| 4 | 1 | 2,623 | 2 | 2,573 | 0 | 26 | 24 | 0 | 0 | 24 | |
| 5 | 6 | 2,629 | 5 | 2,578 | 0 | 26 | 25 | 0 | 0 | 25 | |
| 6 | 4 | 2,633 | 1 | 2,579 | 0 | 26 | 28 | 0 | 0 | 28 | |
| 7 | 1 | 2,634 | 3 | 2,582 | 0 | 26 | 26 | 0 | 0 | 26 | |
| 8 | 6 | 2,640 | 7 | 2,589 | 0 | 26 | 25 | 0 | 0 | 25 | |
| 9 | 2 | 2,642 | 0 | 2,589 | 0 | 26 | 27 | 0 | 0 | 27 | |
| 10 | 2 | 2,644 | 0 | 2,591 | 0 | 26 | 27 | 0 | 0 | 27 | |
| 11 | 0 | 2,643 | 2 | 2,593 | 0 | 26 | 24 | 0 | 0 | 24 | |
| 12 | 1 | 2,643 | 2 | 2,595 | 0 | 26 | 22 | 0 | 0 | 22 | |
| 13 | 1 | 2,644 | 5 | 2,600 | 0 | 26 | 18 | 0 | 0 | 18 | |
| 14 | 1 | 2,645 | 1 | 2,601 | 0 | 26 | 18 | 0 | 0 | 18 | |
| 15 | - | - | - | - | - | - | - | - | - | - | Unavailable |
| 16 | 1 | 2,646 | 0 | 2,601 | 0 | 26 | 19 | 0 | 0 | 19 | |
| 17 | 5 | 2,651 | 6 | 2,607 | 0 | 26 | 18 | 0 | 0 | 18 | |
| 18 | 2 | 2,653 | 1 | 2,608 | 0 | 26 | 19 | 0 | 0 | 19 | |
| 19 | 6 | 2,658 | -1 | 2,607 | 0 | 26 | 25 | 0 | 0 | 25 | |
| 20 | 1 | 2,659 | 2 | 2,609 | 0 | 26 | 24 | 0 | 0 | 24 | |
| 21 | 3 | 2,662 | 3 | 2,613 | 0 | 26 | 23 | 0 | 0 | 23 | |
| 22 | - | - | - | - | - | - | - | - | - | - | No update |
| 23 | 6 | 2,668 | 2 | 2,615 | 0 | 26 | 27 | 0 | 0 | 27 | |
| 24 | 4 | 2,667 | 2 | 2,617 | 0 | 26 | 24 | 0 | 0 | 24 | |
| 25 | 2 | 2,669 | 4 | 2,621 | 0 | 26 | 22 | 0 | 0 | 22 | |
| 26 | 0 | 2,669 | 0 | 2,621 | 0 | 26 | 22 | 0 | 0 | 22 | |
| 27 | 1 | 2,670 | 2 | 2,623 | 0 | 26 | 21 | 0 | 0 | 21 | |
| 28 | 0 | 2,670 | 0 | 2,623 | 0 | 26 | 21 | 0 | 0 | 21 | |
| 29 | - | - | - | - | - | - | - | - | - | - | No update |
| 30 | 2 | 2,672 | 7 | 2,630 | 0 | 26 | 16 | 0 | 0 | 16 | |
| 31 | 1 | 2,673 | 0 | 2,630 | 0 | 26 | 17 | 0 | 0 | 17 | |

On 4 May, it was reported that seven staff members at the New Zealand High Commission in New Delhi had tested positive for COVID-19 over the recent weeks.

On 7 May, the Ministry of Health confirmed that a close contact of a recent COVID-19 community case in Sydney was undergoing in managed isolation in Christchurch as a precautionary measure. New Zealand had temporarily suspending quarantine-free travel with Sydney the previous day following a community outbreak.

On 18 May, an Indian staff member at the New Zealand High Commission in India died from COVID-19. Six other staff members have tested positive for COVID-19.

=== June 2021 ===
| Date | Cases | | Recoveries | | Deaths | | Active cases | | | | Sources |
| Date | New | Total | New | Total | New | Total | Border | Community | Other | Total | Sources |
|---|---|---|---|---|---|---|---|---|---|---|---|
| 1 | 0 | 2,673 | 4 | 2,634 | 0 | 26 | 13 | 0 | 0 | 13 | |
| 2 | 6 | 2,679 | 1 | 2,635 | 0 | 26 | 18 | 0 | 0 | 18 | |
| 3 | 2 | 2,681 | 3 | 2,638 | 0 | 26 | 17 | 0 | 0 | 17 | |
| 4 | 1 | 2,684 | 1 | 2,639 | 0 | 26 | 17 | 0 | 0 | 17 | |
| 5 | - | - | - | - | - | - | - | - | - | - | No update |
| 6 | 1 | 2,682 | 0 | 2,639 | 0 | 26 | 17 | 0 | 0 | 17 | |
| 7 | - | - | - | - | - | - | - | - | - | - | No update |
| 8 | 10 | 2,692 | 5 | 2,644 | 0 | 26 | 22 | 0 | 0 | 22 | |
| 9 | 4 | 2,696 | 2 | 2,646 | 0 | 26 | 24 | 0 | 0 | 24 | |
| 10 | 1 | 2,697 | 1 | 2,647 | 0 | 26 | 24 | 0 | 0 | 24 | |
| 11 | 5 | 2,702 | 0 | 2,647 | 0 | 26 | 29 | 0 | 0 | 29 | |
| 12 | - | - | - | - | - | - | - | - | - | - | No update |
| 13 | 6 | 2,708 | 8 | 2,655 | 0 | 26 | 27 | 0 | 0 | 27 | |
| 14 | 1 | 2,709 | 1 | 2,656 | 0 | 26 | 27 | 0 | 0 | 27 | |
| 15 | 1 | 2,709 | 4 | 2,660 | 0 | 26 | 23 | 0 | 0 | 23 | |
| 16 | 2 | 2,711 | 2 | 2,662 | 0 | 26 | 23 | 0 | 0 | 23 | |
| 17 | 2 | 2,713 | 1 | 2,663 | 0 | 26 | 24 | 0 | 0 | 24 | |
| 18 | 1 | 2,714 | 2 | 2,665 | 0 | 26 | 23 | 0 | 0 | 23 | |
| 19 | - | - | - | - | - | - | - | - | - | - | No update |
| 20 | 4 | 2,718 | 5 | 2,670 | 0 | 26 | 22 | 0 | 0 | 22 | |
| 21 | 3 | 2,720 | 1 | 2,671 | 0 | 26 | 23 | 0 | 0 | 23 | |
| 22 | -1 | 2,719 | 2 | 2,673 | 0 | 26 | 20 | 0 | 0 | 20 | |
| 23 | 4 | 2,723 | 0 | 2,673 | 0 | 26 | 24 | 0 | 0 | 24 | |
| 24 | 0 | 2,723 | 7 | 2,680 | 0 | 26 | 17 | 0 | 0 | 17 | |
| 25 | 2 | 2,725 | 0 | 2,680 | 0 | 26 | 19 | 0 | 0 | 19 | |
| 26 | 4 | 2,729 | 2 | 2,682 | 0 | 26 | 21 | 0 | 0 | 21 | |
| 27 | 1 | 2,728 | 1 | 2,683 | 0 | 26 | 19 | 0 | 0 | 19 | |
| 28 | 10 | 2,738 | 1 | 2,684 | 0 | 26 | 28 | 0 | 0 | 28 | |
| 29 | 4 | 2,741 | 1 | 2,685 | 0 | 26 | 30 | 0 | 0 | 30 | |
| 30 | 1 | 2,742 | 0 | 2,685 | 0 | 26 | 31 | 0 | 0 | 31 | |

On 17 June, health authorities also confirmed an indeterminate test result on Stewart Island where a child registered a weak positive result for COVID-19 during a pre-departure test but subsequently tested negative. The child's family members tested negative for COVID-19.

On 18 June, the Stewart Island child who had earlier returned an indeterminate test for COVID-19 was diagnosed with the rhinovirus, which causes the common cold. Authorities established a pop-up testing station on the island. They also took 93 swabs on Stewart Island.

On 28 June, health authorities confirmed that two contacts of an Australian miner exposed to COVID-19 had travelled to New Zealand.

=== July 2021 ===
| Date | Cases | | Recoveries | | Deaths | | Active cases | | | | Sources |
| Date | New | Total | New | Total | New | Total | Border | Community | Other | Total | Sources |
|---|---|---|---|---|---|---|---|---|---|---|---|
| 1 | 1 | 2,740 | 1 | 2,686 | 0 | 26 | 28 | 0 | 0 | 28 | |
| 2 | 3 | 2,742 | 3 | 2,689 | 0 | 26 | 27 | 0 | 0 | 27 | |
| 3 | - | - | - | - | - | - | - | - | - | - | No update |
| 4 | 9 | 2,751 | 4 | 2,693 | 0 | 26 | 32 | 0 | 0 | 32 | |
| 5 | 7 | 2,758 | 0 | 2,693 | 0 | 26 | 39 | 0 | 0 | 39 | |
| 6 | 0 | 2,758 | 3 | 2,696 | 0 | 26 | 36 | 0 | 0 | 36 | |
| 7 | 5 | 2,763 | 1 | 2,697 | 0 | 26 | 40 | 0 | 0 | 40 | |
| 8 | 1 | 2,764 | 0 | 2,697 | 0 | 26 | 41 | 0 | 0 | 41 | |
| 9 | 1 | 2,765 | 10 | 2,707 | 0 | 26 | 32 | 0 | 0 | 32 | |
| 10 | - | - | - | - | - | - | - | - | - | - | No update |
| 11 | 2 | 2,767 | 0 | 2,707 | 0 | 26 | 34 | 0 | 0 | 34 | |
| 12 | 1 | 2,768 | 2 | 2,709 | 0 | 26 | 33 | 0 | 0 | 33 | |
| 13 | 18 | 2,786 | 8 | 2,717 | 0 | 26 | 43 | 0 | 0 | 43 | |
| 14 | 4 | 2,790 | 5 | 2,722 | 0 | 26 | 42 | 0 | 0 | 42 | |
| 15 | 4 | 2,794 | 1 | 2,723 | 0 | 26 | 45 | 0 | 0 | 45 | |
| 16 | 9 | 2,803 | 6 | 2,729 | 0 | 26 | 48 | 0 | 0 | 48 | |
| 17 | - | - | - | - | - | - | - | - | - | - | No update |
| 18 | 12 | 2,814 | 14 | 2,743 | 0 | 26 | 45 | 0 | 0 | 45 | |
| 19 | 3 | 2,817 | 1 | 2,744 | 0 | 26 | 47 | 0 | 0 | 47 | |
| 20 | 5 | 2,822 | 1 | 2,745 | 0 | 26 | 51 | 0 | 0 | 51 | |
| 21 | 6 | 2,828 | 1 | 2,746 | 0 | 26 | 56 | 0 | 0 | 56 | |
| 22 | 7 | 2,835 | 1 | 2,747 | 0 | 26 | 62 | 0 | 0 | 62 | |
| 23 | 20 | 2,855 | 2 | 2,749 | 0 | 26 | 80 | 0 | 0 | 80 | |
| 24 | - | - | - | - | - | - | - | - | - | - | No update |
| 25 | 7 | 2,862 | 29 | 2,778 | 0 | 26 | 58 | 0 | 0 | 58 | |
| 26 | 1 | 2,863 | 5 | 2,783 | 0 | 26 | 54 | 0 | 0 | 54 | |
| 27 | 1 | 2,863 | 2 | 2,785 | 0 | 26 | 52 | 0 | 0 | 52 | |
| 28 | 1 | 2,864 | 10 | 2,795 | 0 | 26 | 43 | 0 | 0 | 43 | |
| 29 | 3 | 2,867 | 0 | 2,795 | 0 | 26 | 46 | 0 | 0 | 46 | |
| 30 | 3 | 2,870 | 4 | 2,799 | 0 | 26 | 45 | 0 | 0 | 45 | |
| 31 | - | - | - | - | - | - | - | - | - | - | No update |

On 6 July, the Ministry of Health confirmed that two COVID-19 positive mariners were self isolating on a vessel off the coast of Taranaki.

On 8 July, health authorities confirmed that one of the two COVID-19 positive mariners stranded off the coast of Taranaki was infected with the Delta variant. Genome testing found that this new case was not linked to any cases in New Zealand. 15 of the 20 crew on board, including the two positive cases have disembarked and entered into managed isolation.

On 19 July, two mariners aboard the quarantined Marshall Islands–flagged container ship Mattina at Bluff tested positive for COVID-19. They were part of a crew of 21, which had arrived on 18 July. The Ministry of Health confirmed that the ship was being quarantined in a secure area of the port.

On 20 July, seven more crew members of the container ship Mattina tested positive for COVID-19, bringing the total number of infected aboard the ship to nine.

On 24 July, three new positive cases and two historical cases were reported in managed cases, bringing the total number of confirmed cases to 2,504. Ten previously reported cases have recovered while the number of active cases is 75.

=== August 2021 ===
| Date | Cases | | Recoveries | | Deaths | | Active cases | | | | Sources |
| Date | New | Total | New | Total | New | Total | Border | Community | Other | Total | Sources |
|---|---|---|---|---|---|---|---|---|---|---|---|
| 1 | 3 | 2,873 | 12 | 2,811 | 0 | 26 | 36 | 0 | 0 | 36 | |
| 2 | 4 | 2,877 | 3 | 2,814 | 0 | 26 | 37 | 0 | 0 | 37 | |
| 3 | 0 | 2,877 | 7 | 2,821 | 0 | 26 | 30 | 0 | 0 | 30 | |
| 4 | 2 | 2,879 | 3 | 2,824 | 0 | 26 | 29 | 0 | 0 | 29 | |
| 5 | 1 | 2,880 | 0 | 2,824 | 0 | 26 | 30 | 0 | 0 | 30 | |
| 6 | 0 | 2,880 | 5 | 2,829 | 0 | 26 | 25 | 0 | 0 | 25 | |
| 7 | - | - | - | - | - | - | - | - | - | - | No update |
| 8 | 6 | 2,886 | -1 | 2,828 | 0 | 26 | 32 | 0 | 0 | 32 | |
| 9 | 4 | 2,890 | 10 | 2,838 | 0 | 26 | 26 | 0 | 0 | 26 | |
| 10 | 12 | 2,902 | 1 | 2,839 | 0 | 26 | 37 | 0 | 0 | 37 | |
| 11 | 2 | 2,904 | 2 | 2,841 | 0 | 26 | 37 | 0 | 0 | 37 | |
| 12 | 9 | 2,913 | 3 | 2,844 | 0 | 26 | 43 | 0 | 0 | 43 | |
| 13 | 1 | 2,914 | 0 | 2,844 | 0 | 26 | 44 | 0 | 0 | 44 | |
| 14 | - | - | - | - | - | - | - | - | - | - | No update |
| 15 | 5 | 2,919 | 10 | 2,854 | 0 | 26 | 39 | 0 | 0 | 39 | |
| 16 | 7 | 2,926 | 2 | 2,856 | 0 | 26 | 44 | 0 | 0 | 44 | |
| 17 | 0 | 2,926 | 1 | 2,857 | 0 | 26 | 43 | 0 | 0 | 43 | |
| 18 | 10 | 2,936 | 14 | 2,871 | 0 | 26 | 32 | 7 | 0 | 39 | |
| 19 | 18 | 2,954 | 2 | 2,873 | 0 | 26 | 36 | 19 | 0 | 55 | |
| 20 | 14 | 2,968 | 0 | 2,873 | 0 | 26 | 39 | 30 | 0 | 69 | |
| 21 | 24 | 2,992 | 0 | 2,873 | 0 | 26 | 42 | 51 | 0 | 93 | |
| 22 | 24 | 3,016 | 1 | 2,874 | 0 | 26 | 44 | 72 | 0 | 116 | |
| 23 | 38 | 3,054 | 0 | 2,874 | 0 | 26 | 47 | 107 | 0 | 154 | |
| 24 | 42 | 3,096 | 13 | 2,887 | 0 | 26 | 35 | 148 | 0 | 183 | |
| 25 | 63 | 3,159 | 0 | 2,887 | 0 | 26 | 36 | 210 | 0 | 246 | |
| 26 | 68 | 3,227 | 0 | 2,887 | 0 | 26 | 37 | 277 | 0 | 314 | |
| 27 | 70 | 3,297 | 0 | 2,887 | 0 | 26 | 37 | 347 | 0 | 384 | |
| 28 | 83 | 3,380 | 0 | 2,887 | 0 | 26 | 38 | 429 | 0 | 467 | |
| 29 | 85 | 3,464 | 0 | 2,887 | 0 | 26 | 40 | 511 | 0 | 551 | |
| 30 | 55 | 3,519 | 3 | 2,890 | 0 | 26 | 41 | 562 | 0 | 603 | |
| 31 | 50 | 3,569 | 2 | 2,892 | 0 | 26 | 42 | 609 | 0 | 651 | |

On 9 August, the Ministry of Health confirmed that 11 of the 21 crew aboard the Singapore-flagged Rio De La Plata container ship off the coast of Tauranga had tested positive for COVID-19. The ship had berthed at the port city between 4 and 7 August to unload cargo after visiting Queensland and Botany Bay in New South Wales. 94 port workers who had unloaded cargo from the Rio De La Plata underwent testing and self isolation. In addition the Health Ministry confirmed that 13 of the original 21 mariners remained aboard the Mattina container ship. Five mariners were released after 14 days of managed isolation after returning negative COVID tests.

On 10 August, the Ministry of Health confirmed that 110 Port of Tauranga workers had tested negative for COVID-19. Earlier, Prime Minister Jacinda Ardern confirmed that 110 swabs had been taken with 109 returning negative results and one person needing to be retested.

On 17 August, the Ministry of Health confirmed that they were investigating a positive community case in Auckland.

On 18 August, three new cases Delta variant cases were confirmed. One of the new Delta cases was an Auckland University of Technology student, who had 84 close contacts. In addition, 19 new locations of interest were also identified in Auckland including Avondale College, SkyCity Casino, and two supermarkets.

On 19 August, the Delta outbreak increased to 21 confirmed cases, with 11 confirmed that day in Auckland including an Avondale College student, an Auckland City Hospital nurse, and an Auckland University of Technology student. The recent cases of COVID-19 in New Zealand were linked to an Australian case who was taken to Middlemore Hospital earlier in the week. 70 locations of interests were identified in Auckland and the Coromandel Peninsula.

On 20 August, there were a total of 31 community cases, with three cases in Wellington and eight cases in Auckland confirmed over the past 24 hours. The outbreak of the Delta variant in Auckland has been found to a "close match" to a recent returnee from Sydney. That same day, a thousand people who attended the Mitre 10 2021 Awards ceremony at Auckland's Spark Arena on 12 August were ordered to self-isolate after a bar worker later tested positive for COVID-19. Notable participants have included TVNZ broadcaster Hilary Barry, who hosted the event.

On 21 August, there were 21 community cases; in the community with 18 in Auckland and three in Wellington. In addition three cases were reported in managed isolation. The Ministry of Health also identified four new locations of interest including Auckland University of Technology's City Campus and five buses.

On 22 August, 21 community cases were reported; 20 in Auckland and one in Wellington. In addition three cases were reported in managed isolation. That same day, nearly 300 locations of interest had been identified in Auckland and Wellington.

On 23 August, 35 community cases were reported; with 33 in Auckland and two in Wellington. In addition three cases were reported in managed isolation. Auckland University of Technology has confirmed seven new positive cases. That same day, the Samoan Assemblies of God Māngere was identified as a location of interest; with 500 people having attended a service on 15 August.

On 24 August, 41 community cases were reported; 38 in Auckland and three in Wellington. In addition one case was reported in managed isolation. Director-General of Health Ashley Bloomfield confirmed that a child under the age of one was the youngest case in the Delta community outbreak and that several other cases were aged under the age of twenty. Another positive case was a fully vaccinated Managed Isolation and Quarantine (MIQ) worker at the Novotel Ellerslie. Bloomfield also confirmed that a large proportion of new cases were of Samoan ethnicity as a result of the sub-cluster of about 58 cases linked to the Samoan Assemblies of God Mangere church. The community outbreak also affected seven schools along with Auckland University of Technology and the University of Auckland.

On 25 August, 66 people under the age of 19 were confirmed to be infected with the Delta variant. A further 66 people under the age of 30 years were confirmed to be infected with the Delta variant, bringing the total number of cases under the age of 30 to 132. Pasifika made up 69% of cases in the Auckland August delta outbreak, followed by Europeans and other at 33%, Asians at 20% and Māori at 4%. Notable areas of interests including Wellesley Student Accommodation, McAuley High School, Otahuhu College, the Countdown supermarket at Westgate Shopping Centre in Massey, Auckland, and several locations at University of Auckland and Auckland University of Technology.

On 26 August, Director of Public Health Caroline McElnay confirmed there were now 277 cases in the Auckland delta outbreak, with 263 in Auckland and 14 in Wellington. By 26 August, 24,402 individual contacts had been formally identified. 65% had been contacted by contact tracers and were self-isolating while 71% of identified contacts had been tested.

Of the 347 community cases recorded on 27 August 333 are in Auckland and 14 are in Wellington. More than 29,000 individual contacts have been identified, the majority of which are close contacts. There are 19 COVID-19 patients in hospital with one in intensive care. There are 500 locations of interest in the North Island.

On 28 August, the 82 new community cases were all located in Auckland; bringing the total number of Delta community cases to 429 (415 in Auckland and 14 in Wellington). There are 25 community cases in hospital, 23 in stable condition and two in intensive care. A total of 376 cases were epidemiologically linked while links are still being established for the remaining 55. By 28 August, a total of 31,757 individual contacts had been established.

On 29 August, 82 of the new community cases were reported in Auckland while one was reported in Wellington, bringing the total number of community cases in Wellington to 15.

On 30 August, there were 547 community cases in Auckland and 15 in Wellington. 37 cases are in hospital with five in intensive care. There are 79 confirmed cases in the Birkdale Social Network cluster and 280 in the Mangere church cluster. New Zealand health authorities also reported the country's first death of a patient, which was linked to the Pfizer vaccine.

On 31 August, the Health Ministry confirmed that a new COVID-19 variant known as the C. 1.2 had been identified at the border in Auckland in late June 2021.

=== September 2021 ===
| Date | Cases | | Recoveries | | Deaths | | Active cases | | | | Sources |
| Date | New | Total | New | Total | New | Total | Border | Community | Other | Total | Sources |
|---|---|---|---|---|---|---|---|---|---|---|---|
| 1 | 76 | 3,645 | 3 | 2,895 | 0 | 26 | 42 | 682 | 0 | 724 | |
| 2 | 52 | 3,697 | 6 | 2,901 | 0 | 26 | 45 | 725 | 0 | 770 | |
| 3 | 32 | 3,729 | 42 | 2,948 | 0 | 26 | 24 | 731 | 0 | 755 | |
| 4 | 19 | 3,748 | 23 | 2,973 | 1 | 27 | 23 | 728 | 0 | 751 | |
| 5 | 20 | 3,768 | 27 | 2,998 | 0 | 27 | 22 | 721 | 0 | 743 | |
| 6 | 24 | 3,792 | 38 | 3,036 | 0 | 27 | 25 | 704 | 0 | 729 | |
| 7 | 21 | 3,813 | 30 | 3,066 | 0 | 27 | 25 | 694 | 1 | 720 | |
| 8 | 16 | 3,829 | 78 | 3,144 | 0 | 27 | 21 | 636 | 1 | 658 | |
| 9 | 18 | 3,847 | 51 | 3,195 | 0 | 27 | 22 | 603 | 0 | 625 | |
| 10 | 19 | 3,866 | 27 | 3,222 | 0 | 27 | 27 | 590 | 0 | 617 | |
| 11 | 24 | 3,890 | 1 | 3,223 | 0 | 27 | 28 | 612 | 0 | 640 | |
| 12 | 23 | 3,913 | 64 | 3,287 | 0 | 27 | 30 | 569 | 0 | 599 | |
| 13 | 36 | 3,949 | 21 | 3,308 | 0 | 27 | 32 | 582 | 0 | 614 | |
| 14 | 17 | 3,966 | 27 | 3,335 | 0 | 27 | 29 | 575 | 0 | 604 | |
| 15 | 17 | 3,981 | 63 | 3,398 | 0 | 27 | 26 | 530 | 0 | 556 | |
| 16 | 18 | 3,999 | 9 | 3,407 | 0 | 27 | 29 | 536 | 0 | 565 | |
| 17 | 16 | 4,014 | 91 | 3,498 | 0 | 27 | 32 | 457 | 0 | 489 | |
| 18 | 24 | 4,038 | 93 | 3,591 | 0 | 27 | 34 | 386 | 0 | 420 | |
| 19 | 22 | 4,060 | 48 | 3,639 | 0 | 27 | 33 | 361 | 0 | 394 | |
| 20 | 22 | 4,082 | 6 | 3,645 | 0 | 27 | 34 | 376 | 0 | 410 | |
| 21 | 13 | 4,095 | 98 | 3,743 | 0 | 27 | 31 | 294 | 0 | 325 | |
| 22 | 24 | 4,119 | 48 | 3,791 | 0 | 27 | 29 | 272 | 0 | 301 | |
| 23 | 17 | 4,135 | 28 | 3,819 | 0 | 27 | 28 | 261 | 0 | 289 | |
| 24 | 9 | 4,144 | 42 | 3,861 | 0 | 27 | 28 | 228 | 0 | 256 | |
| 25 | 18 | 4,162 | 24 | 3,885 | 0 | 27 | 25 | 225 | 0 | 250 | |
| 26 | 21 | 4,183 | 46 | 3,931 | 0 | 27 | 12 | 213 | 0 | 225 | |
| 27 | 11 | 4,194 | 14 | 3,945 | 0 | 27 | 11 | 211 | 0 | 222 | |
| 28 | 10 | 4,204 | 16 | 3,961 | 0 | 27 | 14 | 202 | 0 | 216 | |
| 29 | 45 | 4,248 | 4 | 3,965 | 0 | 27 | 13 | 243 | 0 | 256 | |
| 30 | 25 | 4,273 | 9 | 3,974 | 0 | 27 | 16 | 256 | 0 | 272 | |

On 4 September, the 27th confirmed COVID-19 death was a woman in her 90s who had been admitted to North Shore Hospital on 28 August 2021.

On 16 September, one of the new community cases was an Auckland truck driver who traveled to Hamilton, Cambridge, and Tauranga.

On 19 September, the Ministry of Health confirmed three positive cases in Whakatīwai, Waikato. All three cases are household members of a Mount Eden Prison inmate who tested positive for COVID-19 that same day. Five further household contacts along with several Corrections staff, other prisoners, police and court staff have tested negative.

On 20 September, a pop-up testing centre was established at a marae in Wharekawa within the Whakatīwai region. By 2pm, 340 tests had been conducted.

All new cases reported on 29 September were in Auckland. 33 are close or household contacts of existing cases and weren't infectious in the community. 12 of the new cases are "unlinked" mystery cases. Areas of interest including the Kelston Mall in West Auckland and the 77 Convenience Store at 103 Victoria St West. In addition, 400 people were tested in Tauranga after a positive wastewater test result was announced on 28 September.

=== October 2021 ===
| Date | Cases | | Recoveries | | Deaths | | Active cases | | | | Sources |
| Date | New | Total | New | Total | New | Total | Border | Community | Other | Total | Sources |
|---|---|---|---|---|---|---|---|---|---|---|---|
| 1 | 20 | 4,291 | 15 | 3,989 | 0 | 27 | 14 | 260 | 1 | 275 | |
| 2 | 29 | 4,319 | 64 | 4,053 | 0 | 27 | 13 | 226 | 0 | 239 | |
| 3 | 33 | 4,352 | 9 | 4,062 | 0 | 27 | 13 | 250 | 0 | 263 | |
| 4 | 31 | 4,382 | 6 | 4,068 | 0 | 27 | 13 | 274 | 0 | 287 | |
| 5 | 26 | 4,408 | 5 | 4,073 | 0 | 27 | 14 | 294 | 0 | 308 | |
| 6 | 42 | 4,450 | 0 | 4,073 | 0 | 27 | 15 | 334 | 1 | 350 | |
| 7 | 31 | 4,480 | 4 | 4,077 | 0 | 27 | 13 | 362 | 1 | 376 | |
| 8 | 47 | 4,527 | 0 | 4,077 | 1 | 28 | 16 | 406 | 0 | 422 | |
| 9 | 36 | 4,563 | 39 | 4,116 | 0 | 28 | 17 | 402 | 0 | 419 | |
| 10 | 61 | 4,624 | 24 | 4,140 | 0 | 28 | 18 | 438 | 0 | 456 | |
| 11 | 35 | 4,659 | 22 | 4,162 | 0 | 28 | 17 | 452 | 0 | 469 | |
| 12 | 46 | 4,704 | 20 | 4,182 | 0 | 28 | 18 | 476 | 0 | 494 | |
| 13 | 55 | 4,759 | 2 | 4,184 | 0 | 28 | 18 | 529 | 0 | 547 | |
| 14 | 72 | 4,831 | 2 | 4,186 | 0 | 28 | 18 | 599 | 0 | 617 | |
| 15 | 66 | 4,897 | 0 | 4,186 | 0 | 28 | 19 | 664 | 0 | 683 | |
| 16 | 43 | 4,939 | 60 | 4,246 | 0 | 28 | 19 | 646 | 0 | 665 | |
| 17 | 53 | 4,991 | 75 | 4,321 | 0 | 28 | 21 | 621 | 0 | 642 | |
| 18 | 65 | 5,055 | 54 | 4,375 | 0 | 28 | 19 | 633 | 0 | 652 | |
| 19 | 99 | 5,153 | 14 | 4,389 | 0 | 28 | 23 | 713 | 0 | 736 | |
| 20 | 62 | 4,854 | 6 | 4,395 | 0 | 28 | 23 | 767 | 0 | 790 | |
| 21 | 104 | 5,315 | 1 | 4,396 | 0 | 28 | 23 | 868 | 0 | 891 | |
| 22 | 134 | 5,449 | 6 | 4,402 | 0 | 28 | 27 | 992 | 0 | 1,019 | |
| 23 | 106 | 5,554 | 5 | 4,407 | 0 | 28 | 29 | 1,090 | 0 | 1,119 | |
| 24 | 85 | 5,638 | 50 | 4,457 | 0 | 28 | 31 | 1,122 | 0 | 1,153 | |
| 25 | 111 | 5,749 | 8 | 4,465 | 0 | 28 | 33 | 1,223 | 0 | 1,256 | |
| 26 | 80 | 5,822 | 97 | 4,562 | 0 | 28 | 23 | 1,209 | 0 | 1,232 | |
| 27 | 78 | 5,899 | 5 | 4,567 | 0 | 28 | 24 | 1,280 | 0 | 1,304 | |
| 28 | 97 | 5,995 | 7 | 4,574 | 0 | 28 | 29 | 1,363 | 1 | 1,393 | |
| 29 | 129 | 6,124 | 6 | 4,580 | 0 | 28 | 31 | 1,484 | 1 | 1,516 | |
| 30 | 162 | 6,285 | 5 | 4,585 | 0 | 28 | 33 | 1,638 | 1 | 1672 | |
| 31 | 143 | 6,428 | 62 | 4,647 | 0 | 28 | 31 | 1,721 | 1 | 1,753 | |

On 3 October, Director-General of Health Ashley Bloomfield confirmed that 18 of the 33 cases were epidemiologically linked to previous cases. Two new cases were also reported in Hamilton in the Waikato region. In addition, an Auckland truck driver who drove to Palmerston North also tested positive for COVID-19.

On 4 October, there were 29 new community cases, with 28 in Auckland and one in Waikato. One of the new cases is a baby at the North Shore Hospital maternity ward.

On 5 October, 24 community cases were reported; 18 were in Auckland while the other six were in Waikato.

On 6 October, the country's 28th fatality was a man in his 50s who was a member of the Mangere Samoan Assemblies of God church, which had been at the centre of the Delta outbreak in August 2021. Of the 39 new community cases, 30 were located in Auckland and nine in Waikato.

On 7 October, Waikato reported five of the community cases, bringing the total number of community cases in the region to 22. In response, lockdown restrictions were extended in parts of Waikato including Waitomo (including Te Kūiti), Waipa, Ōtorohanga, Mōkau, the northern Pureora Forest Park, Te Awamutu, Karapiro, and Cambridge.

On 9 October, the Ministry of Health confirmed a positive case in Katikati in the North Island's Bay of Plenty region. The individual was a person living in Pukekohe, Auckland who is the process of moving to a rural area north of Katikati.

On 10 October, 10 locations of interest were identified in Katikati as a result of yesterday's community case. Of the 60 community reported today; 56 are in Auckland, three in Waikato, and one in the Bay of Plenty.

On 11 October, it was confirmed that three people who arrived at Auckland's Mount Eden Prison in October had tested positive for COVID-19. All of the 35 new community cases are in Auckland, with 21 of them unlinked and under investigation.

On 13 October, 53 of the new cases occurred in Auckland while two occurred in Waikato. 21 of the new cases remain unlinked.

On 14 October, there were 71 community cases in Auckland and one at the border. 32 cases are yet to be epidemiologically linked. 102 of the cases reported in the last fortnight are unlinked.

On 19 October, a record of 94 community cases were reported; 87 are in Auckland and seven in Waikato. 41 of these cases have been epidemiologically linked to the current Auckland outbreak while a further 53 remained unlinked to existing cases.

On 21 October 102 community cases were reported; 94 in Auckland and eight in Waikato. 40 of the new cases remained unlinked, bringing the total number of unlinked cases in the past 14 days to 199.

On 22 October, a record of 129 community cases were reported; 120 are in Auckland and nine are in Waikato. 64 cases have been linked while 65 cases have yet to be linked.

On 23 October 104 community cases were reported; 91 are in Auckland, eight are in Waikato, four in Northland, and one in Blenheim in the Marlborough Region. A total of 2,172 cases have been epidemiologically linked to the August 2021 community outbreak. The Blenheim case's fights Flight NZ8231 Rotorua to Wellington at 7am, and Flight NZ8725 Wellington to Blenheim at 9am, and Wellington Airport have been listed as locations of interest.

On 24 October, 80 community cases were reported; 77 were in Auckland, two in Waikato, and one in Northland.

On 28 October, two positive community cases (both unvaccinated) were reported in Christchurch in the South Island. One of these cases had returned from Auckland to their home in Christchurch. 83 community cases were also reported in Auckland and four in Waikato.

On 29 October, there were 125 community cases including two in Christchurch and one at an Auckland rest home.

=== November 2021 ===
| Date | Cases | | Recoveries | | Deaths | | Active cases | | | | Sources |
| Date | New | Total | New | Total | New | Total | Border | Community | Other | Total | Sources |
|---|---|---|---|---|---|---|---|---|---|---|---|
| 1 | 166 | 6,594 | 3 | 4,650 | 0 | 28 | 34 | 1,882 | 0 | 1,916 | |
| 2 | 129 | 6,723 | 81 | 4,731 | 0 | 28 | 35 | 1,929 | 0 | 1,964 | |
| 3 | 110 | 6,832 | 11 | 4,742 | 0 | 28 | 45 | 2,017 | 0 | 2,062 | |
| 4 | 142 | 6,972 | 17 | 4,759 | 0 | 28 | 46 | 2,139 | 0 | 2,185 | |
| 5 | 167 | 7,138 | 14 | 4,773 | 1 | 29 | 46 | 2,290 | 0 | 2,336 | |
| 6 | 207 | 7,342 | 14 | 4,787 | 2 | 31 | 45 | 2,479 | 0 | 2,524 | |
| 7 | 114 | 7,456 | 74 | 4,681 | 0 | 31 | 39 | 2,525 | 0 | 2,564 | |
| 8 | 193 | 7,648 | 1 | 4,862 | 1 | 32 | 42 | 2,712 | 0 | 2,754 | |
| 9 | 128 | 7,775 | 56 | 4,918 | 0 | 32 | 37 | 2,788 | 0 | 2,825 | |
| 10 | 149 | 7,922 | 5 | 4,923 | 0 | 32 | 35 | 2,932 | 0 | 2,967 | |
| 11 | 185 | 8,107 | 60 | 4,983 | 1 | 33 | 35 | 3,056 | 0 | 3,091 | |
| 12 | 202 | 8,306 | 15 | 4,998 | 0 | 33 | 33 | 3,242 | 0 | 3,275 | |
| 13 | 177 | 8,482 | 45 | 5,043 | 0 | 33 | 33 | 3,373 | 0 | 3,406 | |
| 14 | 210 | 8,692 | 47 | 5,090 | 0 | 33 | 34 | 3,535 | 0 | 3,569 | |
| 15 | 174 | 8,866 | 86 | 5,176 | 1 | 34 | 34 | 3,622 | 0 | 3,656 | |
| 16 | 222 | 9,088 | 6 | 5,182 | 1 | 35 | 34 | 3,837 | 0 | 3,871 | |
| 17 | 197 | 9,285 | 17 | 5,199 | 0 | 35 | 28 | 4,022 | 1 | 4,051 | |
| 18 | 167 | 9,452 | 26 | 5,225 | 0 | 35 | 28 | 4,163 | 1 | 4,192 | |
| 19 | 200 | 9,652 | 65 | 5,290 | 3 | 38 | 23 | 4,300 | 1 | 4,324 | |
| 20 | 171 | 9,823 | 73 | 5,363 | 1 | 39 | 24 | 4,396 | 1 | 4,421 | |
| 21 | 149 | 9,972 | 133 | 5,496 | 0 | 39 | 23 | 4,413 | 1 | 4,437 | |
| 22 | 205 | 10,176 | 2 | 5,498 | 1 | 40 | 23 | 4,614 | 1 | 4,638 | |
| 23 | 217 | 10,393 | 27 | 5,525 | 0 | 40 | 26 | 4,801 | 1 | 4,828 | |
| 24 | 216 | 10,609 | 8 | 5,533 | 0 | 40 | 27 | 5,009 | 0 | 5,036 | |
| 25 | 180 | 10,789 | 2 | 5,535 | 1 | 41 | 31 | 5,182 | 0 | 5,213 | |
| 26 | 177 | 10,966 | 14 | 5,549 | 1 | 42 | 36 | 5,339 | 0 | 5,375 | |
| 27 | 148 | 11,114 | 18 | 5,567 | 0 | 42 | 41 | 5,464 | 0 | 5,505 | |
| 28 | 148 | 11,260 | 68 | 5,635 | 1 | 43 | 43 | 5,539 | 0 | 5,582 | |
| 29 | 185 | 11,444 | 9 | 5,645 | 0 | 43 | 46 | 5,710 | 0 | 5,756 | |
| 30 | 135 | 11,576 | 9 | 5,654 | 1 | 44 | 44 | 5,834 | 0 | 5,874 | |

On 1 November 162 new community cases were reported; 156 in Auckland and six in Waikato. 1,115 people in Auckland were isolating at home, including 564 cases across 372 households.

On 2 November 126 new community cases were reported; 107 in Auckland, one in Kaitaia, Northland, and 18 in Waikato. That same day, the northern part of the Northland Region was placed on lockdown after authorities were unable to find any epidemiological links for two community cases.

On 3 November 100 community cases were reported; 97 in Auckland and three in Waikato. Later that day, a COVID-19 positive individual was reported to have died. The person had contracted COVID-19 on 24 October and was self-isolating in Manukau. Their death has been referred to the coroner.

On 4 November 139 community cases were reported; 136 in Auckland, two in Waikato, and one in Northland. 64 people remained in hospital. Health authorities also confirmed that the recent death of a 40-year old COVID-19-positive man was not related to COVID-19 vaccines.

On 5 November 163 new community cases were reported, including four in the Waikato towns of Hamilton, Te Awamutu, Ngāruawāhia and Te Kūiti. Ngāti Ruanui leader Rachel Rae confirmed that a strong positive COVID-19 Delta variant wastewater test result within the wastewater system of Stratford in the Taranaki region. That same day, the Ministry of Health confirmed that wastewater samples in Gisborne and Napier had tested positive for COVID-19, indicating the presence of COVID-19 in the Gisborne District and Hawke's Bay Region. That same day, Director of Public Health Dr Caroline McElnay confirmed that a male COVID-19 patient in his fifties self-isolating at home had died.

On 6 November, a record 206 community cases were reported; 200 in Auckland, four in Waikato, and two in Northland. The Health Ministry reported that 159 cases have yet to be linked to earlier cases, bringing the total number of unlinked cases in the past two weeks to 623. That same day, a second person in self-quarantine was reported to have died from COVID-19 at home.

On 7 November 113 new community cases (109 in Auckland, three in Waikato, and one in Northland) were reported. There are a record 74 cases in hospital. That same day, a student at Avondale College tested positive for COVID-19. While the school won't be closed, students will be asked to study from home. That evening, a resthome in Te Awamutu, Waikato went into lockdown after health authorities confirmed that a resthome worker tested positive for COVID-19.

On 8 November 190 community cases (182 in Auckland, seven in Waikato, and one in Northland) were reported. 81 people are in hospital, with seven in intensive care. That same day, Stuff reported that a man charged with organising an anti-lockdown protest in Auckland on 30 October had tested positive for COVID-19. Health authorities also confirmed the death of a person in their late sixties at Auckland City Hospital.

On 9 November 125 community cases (117 in Auckland, two in Waikato, and six in Northland). 79 cases were hospitalised with nine in intensive care.

On 10 November 147 community cases (131 in Auckland, 14 in Waikato, and two in Northland) were reported. 63 cases were unlinked. There were 81 cases in hospital including 11 in intensive care.

On 11 November 185 new community cases (152 in Auckland, eight in Northland, and 25 in Waikato) were reported. One new death was added to the national COVID-19 death toll. This death was being investigated by the Police. The deceased patient was later identified as a man in his sixties from Glen Eden, whose family had also tested positive for COVID-19. Later that day, six new community cases were reported in Stratford in the Taranaki region several days after COVID-19 was found in the area's wastewater.

On 12 November 201 new community cases (181 in Auckland, four in Northland, 15 in Waikato, and one in Taranaki) were reported. 85 people were in hospital with 11 in intensive care.

On 13 November 175 new community cases (159 in Auckland, two in Northland, eight in Waikato, five in Taranaki, and one in Lakes) were reported nationwide. There were 93 cases in hospital with nine in intensive care. In addition, the Health Ministry confirmed there was a positive case in Taupō.

On 14 November 207 new community cases (192 in Auckland, seven are in Waikato, two in Northland, four in the Rotorua Lakes District, and two in MidCentral) were reported. A 90-year-old woman from Edmonton Meadows Care Home was added to the death toll, bringing it to 33. There are 90 cases in hospital.

On 15 November 173 community cases were reported (163 in Auckland, seven in Waikato, two are in Northland, and one in the Rotorua Lakes District). There are 90 cases in hospital: 26 in North Shore, 21 in Middlemore, 39 in Auckland, two in Waitakere Hospital and one each in Whangārei and Waikato.

On 16 November, a record 222 community cases (197 in Auckland, 20 in Waikato, two in Taupō, two in Wairarapa, and one in Northland) were reported. A female patient in her 70s at the Auckland City Hospital was reported to have died from COVID-19.

On 17 November 194 community cases (three in Northland, 180 in Auckland, five in Waikato, and six in the Taupō District) were reported. Later that afternoon, the Health Ministry confirmed a new community case in Christchurch. The individual had traveled to Auckland to attend a tangihanga and returned to Christchurch on 13 November on Air New Zealand flight NZ1295.

On 18 November 167 community cases were reported (five in Northland, 142 in Auckland, 17 in Waikato, one in Bay of Plenty, one in Lakes, and one in the Canterbury regions. Two deaths were also reported including a woman in her 80s at Middlemore Hospital and a man in his 90s at North Shore Hospital.

On 19 November 198 community cases (152 in Auckland, 30 in Waikato, five in Northland, six in the Bay of Plenty, two in the Lakes District Health Board, and one each in the MidCentral District Health Board, Wairarapa and Canterbury) were reported. 76 remain in hospital including six in intensive care.

On 20 November 172 community cases (148 in Auckland, one in Wellington (Capital and Coast District Health Board), three in the Bay of Plenty, four in the Lakes District Health Board, 12 in Waikato, and four in Northland) were reported. 97 of these cases are unlinked. 70 are in hospital including five in intensive care.

On 21 November 149 new community cases (140 in Auckland, six in Waikato, three in Northland, two in Bay of Plenty and one in Canterbury) were reported. 83 cases are in hospital, with five in intensive care.

On 22 November, the total number of cases reached the 10,000 threshold, reaching 10,176. The death toll also reached 40. 205 community cases (175 in Auckland, 20 in Waikato, five in Bay of Plenty, one in Taupō and four in Northland) were reported. That same day, the Health Ministry confirmed the death of a man in his forties at Middlemore Hospital.

On 23 November 215 new community cases (196 in Auckland, 11 in Waikato, four in Northland, two in the Lakes District Health Board, one in the Bay of Plenty, and one in MidCentral) were reported. 88 case are in hospital, with six in intensive care. The Ministry of Health also confirmed the death of a COVID-19 patient admitted to Auckland City Hospital on 17 November.

On 25 November, a patient in their 50s was reported to have died at Auckland City Hospital the previous day, bringing the death toll to 41. The 41st victim was later identified as Auckland rugby league player Peter Griffiths.

On 29 November, one new community case was reported in Nelson in the South Island. By 30 November, this had risen to three community cases.

=== December 2021 ===
| Date | Cases | | Recoveries | | Deaths | | Active cases | | | | Sources |
| Date | New | Total | New | Total | New | Total | Border | Community | Other | Total | Sources |
|---|---|---|---|---|---|---|---|---|---|---|---|
| 1 | 149 | 11,723 | 17 | 5,671 | 0 | 44 | 47 | 5,961 | 0 | 6,008 | |
| 2 | 174 | 11,895 | 33 | 5,704 | 0 | 44 | 47 | 6,100 | 0 | 6,147 | |
| 3 | 98 | 11,992 | 55 | 5,759 | 0 | 44 | 51 | 6,138 | 0 | 6,189 | |
| 4 | 100 | 12,087 | 14 | 5,773 | 0 | 44 | 52 | 6,218 | 0 | 6,270 | |
| 5 | 108 | 12,195 | 61 | 5,834 | 0 | 44 | 53 | 6,264 | 0 | 6,317 | |
| 6 | 136 | 12,331 | 51 | 5,885 | 0 | 44 | 52 | 6,350 | 0 | 6,402 | |
| 7 | 99 | 12,428 | 83 | 5,968 | 0 | 44 | 41 | 6,375 | 0 | 6,416 | |
| 8 | 90 | 12,516 | 41 | 6,009 | 0 | 44 | 41 | 6,422 | 0 | 6,643 | |
| 9 | 105 | 12,621 | 10 | 6,019 | 0 | 44 | 42 | 6,516 | 0 | 6,558 | |
| 10 | 90 | - | - | - | 2 | - | - | - | - | - | |
| 11 | 96 | 12,717 | 24 | 6,043 | 2 | 46 | 38 | 6,592 | 0 | 6,630 | |
| 12 | 104 | 12,884 | 26 | 6,100 | 0 | 46 | 41 | 6,696 | 0 | 6,738 | |
| 13 | 103 | 12,986 | 28 | 6,128 | 1 | 47 | 41 | 6,769 | 1 | 6,811 | |
| 14 | 82 | 13,067 | 29 | 6,157 | 0 | 47 | 43 | 6,819 | 1 | 6,863 | |
| 15 | 76 | 13,143 | 36 | 6,193 | 0 | 47 | 42 | 6,860 | 1 | 6,903 | |
| 16 | 95 | 13,238 | 23 | 10,791 | 1 | 48 | 24 | 2,194 | 1 | 2,219 | |
| 17 | 79 | 13,317 | 19 | 11,165 | 1 | 49 | 26 | 2,075 | 1 | 2,102 | |
| 18 | 49 | 13,366 | 21 | 11,324 | 0 | 49 | 36 | 1,956 | 1 | 1,993 | |
| 19 | 63 | 13,425 | 32 | 11,474 | 0 | 49 | 42 | 1,859 | 1 | 1,902 | |
| 20 | 71 | 13,495 | 13 | 11,642 | 0 | 49 | 42 | 1,761 | 1 | 1,804 | |
| 21 | 33 | 13,531 | 119 | 11,761 | 0 | 49 | 46 | 1,674 | 1 | 1,721 | |
| 22 | 60 | 13,589 | 126 | 11,887 | 0 | 49 | 47 | 1,605 | 1 | 1,653 | |
| 23 | 60 | 13,648 | 127 | 12,014 | 0 | 49 | 48 | 1,536 | 1 | 1,585 | |
| 24 | 72 | 13,719 | 20 | 12,122 | 0 | 49 | 57 | 1,490 | 1 | 1,548 | |
| 25 | - | - | - | - | - | - | - | - | - | No update | |
| 26 | 70 | 13,855 | 103 | 12,361 | 1 | 50 | 59 | 1,384 | 1 | 1,444 | |
| 27 | 44 | 13,899 | 13 | 12,458 | 0 | 50 | 68 | 1,322 | 1 | 1,391 | |
| 28 | 34 | 13,932 | 21 | 12,548 | 0 | 50 | 83 | 12,50 | 1 | 1,334 | |
| 29 | 54 | 13,986 | 24 | 12,663 | 1 | 51 | 90 | 1,181 | 1 | 1,272 | |
| 30 | 71 | 14,057 | 19 | 12,780 | 0 | 51 | 98 | 1,127 | 1 | 1,226 | |
| 31 | 62 | 14,118 | 13 | 12,870 | 0 | 51 | 107 | 1,089 | 1 | 1,197 | |

On 1 December, the number of community cases in Nelson reached four. In response, several testing centres were established. In addition, the Ministry of Health also established a list of locations of interests including a brothel, bars, supermarkets, and petrol stations.

On 6 December, four new cases were reported in Nelson, bringing the total number of community cases in the city to 19.

On 10 December, 95 new community cases were reported, bringing the total number of cases associated with the Delta variant outbreak to 9,552. Two deaths were also reported; one at Middlemore Hospital and the other at Auckland City Hospital. 56 people are in hospital and there are 6,630 active cases. The patient who died at Auckland City Hospital was later identified as an individual in their 30s, making them the youngest person to die of COVID-19 in New Zealand.

On 14 December, the Health Ministry confirmed that several flight crew in managed isolation had been identified as close contacts of an Omicron variant case in Australia.

On 15 December, the Health Ministry confirmed that one person had died from COVID-19 at Tauranga Hospital. In addition, 74 community cases were reported including 15 in the South Taranaki town of Eltham, 56 in Auckland, seven in Tauranga, and nine in Waikato.

On 16 December, New Zealand confirmed its first case of the Omicron variant, an individual who arrived in Auckland from Germany via Dubai on 10 December. The individual then flew to an MIQ facility in Christchurch via a flight chartered for international arrivals. As a precautionary measure, all individuals on that flight were required to go into managed isolation for ten days.

On 17 December, the Health Ministry confirmed that a child under the age of ten years who had died earlier in the week was the youngest COVID-19 case to die in New Zealand. The child was a contact of an identified case but was not a known COVID-19 case prior to their death. The child was subsequently identified as a Māori boy, leading for calls from several health experts including Dr Siouxsie Wiles to give priority to Māori and Pacific Islanders in the vaccine rollout.

That same day, three more Omicron cases were reported in managed isolation. These cases were unrelated to the Christchurch case reported yesterday and had arrived in Auckland from Dubai on 11 December and traveled to a Rotorua MIQ facility on a bus chartered for international arrivals.

On 18 December, 39 community cases were reported (25 in Auckland, 11 in the Bay of Plenty, two in the Lakes District, and one in Taranaki). Four new Omicron variant cases were reported at the border, bringing the total number of Omicron cases in the country to eight.

On 21 December, one community case was reported in the Hutt Valley in the Wellington Region. Authorities identified four locations of interest in Lower Hutt and one in Upper Hutt.

On 24 December, one new community was reported in Kaiapoi in the Canterbury region. The case had recently traveled from Auckland to Christchurch on 20 December. As a result, Kaiapoi New World, Nori Table, Kaiapoi North Pharmacy, and Christchurch International Airport were identified as areas of interest. That same day, a patient at North Shore Hospital was reported to have succumbed to COVID-19 at North Shore Hospital in Auckland.

On 25 December, The New Zealand Herald reported that a staff member at the Auckland Region Women's Corrections Facility had tested positive for COVID-19. As a result, 55 prisoners and 21 staff went into isolation.

On 29 December, the first Omicron community case was reported in Auckland. The patient was identified as British electronic music artist Robert Etheridge (Dimension). Etheridge had undergone seven days in managed isolation and quarantine, followed by three days in home isolation. He had been due to perform at the Rhythm & Alps music festival. Dimension had previously tested negative three times prior to a positive test on 27 December.

On 30 December, 60 new community cases were reported including one Omicron case. 11 new Delta variant cases and six new Omicron cases were reported at the border. That same day, one new Delta community case was reported in Napier.

On 31 December, one new community case was reported in Napier. This was a close contact of the previous case reported yesterday.

== Alert levels timeline ==
| Date | Alert level | | |
| Date | New Zealand | Wellington Region | Auckland Region |
|---|---|---|---|
| January 2021 | 1 | | |
| 15 February 2021 | ▲2 | | ▲3 |
| 18 February 2021 | ▼1 | | ▼2 |
| 23 February 2021 | 1 | | ▼1 |
| 28 February 2021 | ▲2 | | ▲3 |
| 7 March 2021 | ▼1 | | ▼2 |
| 12 March 2021 | 1 | | ▼1 |
| 23 June 2021 | 1 | ▲2 | 1 |
| 30 June 2021 | 1 | ▼1 | 1 |

| Date | Alert level | | | | | |
| Date | New Zealand | Northland Region (Note: From 2 November, Northern Northland only.) | Upper Northland | Upper Hauraki | North West Waikato (Note: From 4 October 2021 comprising Raglan, Te Kauwhata, Huntly, Ngāruawāhia, Hamilton City and some surrounding areas. This area was extended on 9 October to include Waitomo District, including Te Kūiti, Waipa District and Ōtorohanga District.) | Auckland Region |
|---|---|---|---|---|---|---|
| 18 August 2021 | ▲4 | | | | | |
| 1 September 2021 | ▼3 | 4 | | ▼3 | | 4 |
| 3 September 2021 | 3 | ▼3 | | 3 | | 4 |
| 8 September 2021 | ▼2 | | | | | 4 |
| 22 September 2021 | 2 | | | ▲3 | 2 | ▼3 |
| 26 September 2021 | 2 | | | 2 | 2 | 3 |
| 4 October 2021 | 2 | | | | ▲3 | 3 |
| 9 October 2021 | 2 | ▲3 | | 2 | 3 | |
| 20 October 2021 | 2 | ▼2 | | 2 | 3 | |
| 2 November 2021 | 2 | 2 | ▲3 | 2 | 3 | |
| 11 November 2021 | 2 | 2 | ▼2 | 2 | 3 | |
| 16 November 2021 | 2 | | | | ▼2 | 3 |

== Traffic lights timeline ==
| Date | COVID-19 Protection Framework (traffic lights) | | |
| Date | Red | Orange | Green |
|---|---|---|---|
| 3 December 2021 | Northland, Auckland, Taupō and Rotorua Lakes Districts, Kawerau, Whakatane, Ōpōtiki Districts, Gisborne District, Wairoa District, Rangitikei, Whanganui and Ruapehu Districts | Rest of North Island, South Island | None |
| 31 December 2021 | Northland | Rest of North Island, South Island | None |
