= COVID-19 Response Recognition Award =

New Zealand service award

COVID-19 Response Recognition Award Te Tohu Urupare KOWHEORI-19
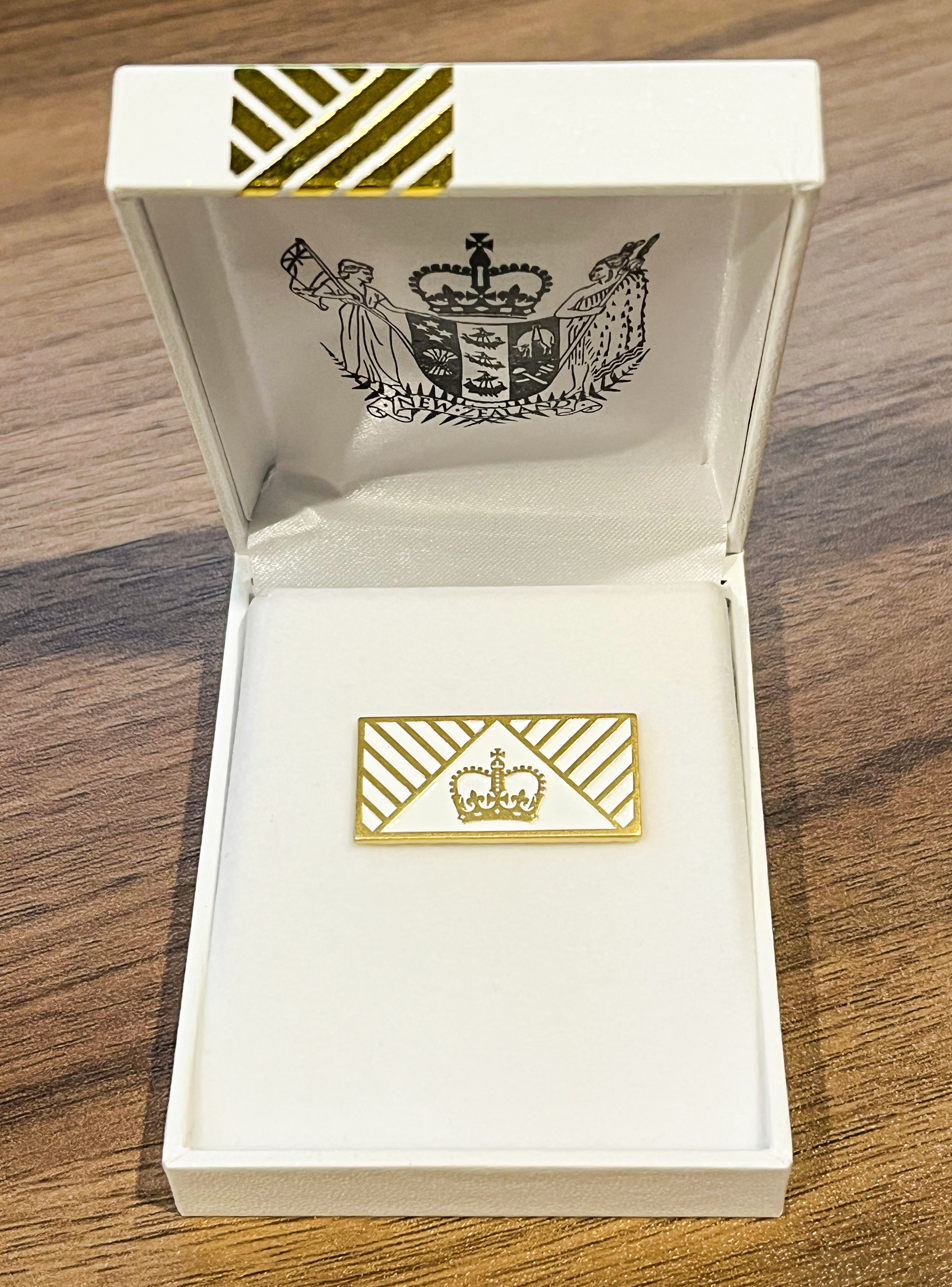
- Type: Service award
- Awarded for: Contributing to New Zealand's COVID-19 response frontline workforce
- Country: New Zealand
- Presented by: New Zealand Government
- Eligibility: New Zealand individuals and organisations
- Status: Only awarded in 2023

The COVID-19 Response Recognition Award (Māori: Te Tohu Urupare KOWHEORI-19) is a service award established by the New Zealand government in 2022 to recognise individuals and organisations who contributed to New Zealand’s frontline workforce COVID-19 response. The award was distributed from late January 2023 to approximately 80,000 individual recipients.

The award was in the form of a lapel pin and certificate, designed and manufactured by Mayer and Toye of Wellington. People that were eligible to receive the award included those who worked for at least a month in total as part of the managed isolation and quarantine (MIQ) system, at the border, in COVID-19 testing, vaccination or contact tracing, or as medical staff caring for COVID-19 patients.

The organisational award, in the form of a digital certificate, was awarded to organisations that contributed to New Zealand's COVID-19 response as part of the MIQ system, either as an active frontline organisation, a contracted supplier of services for MIQ, or an iwi partner or community group supporting people staying in MIQ facilities.
