= Distinction Christchurch Hotel =

Hotel in Christchurch, New Zealand

Distinction Christchurch
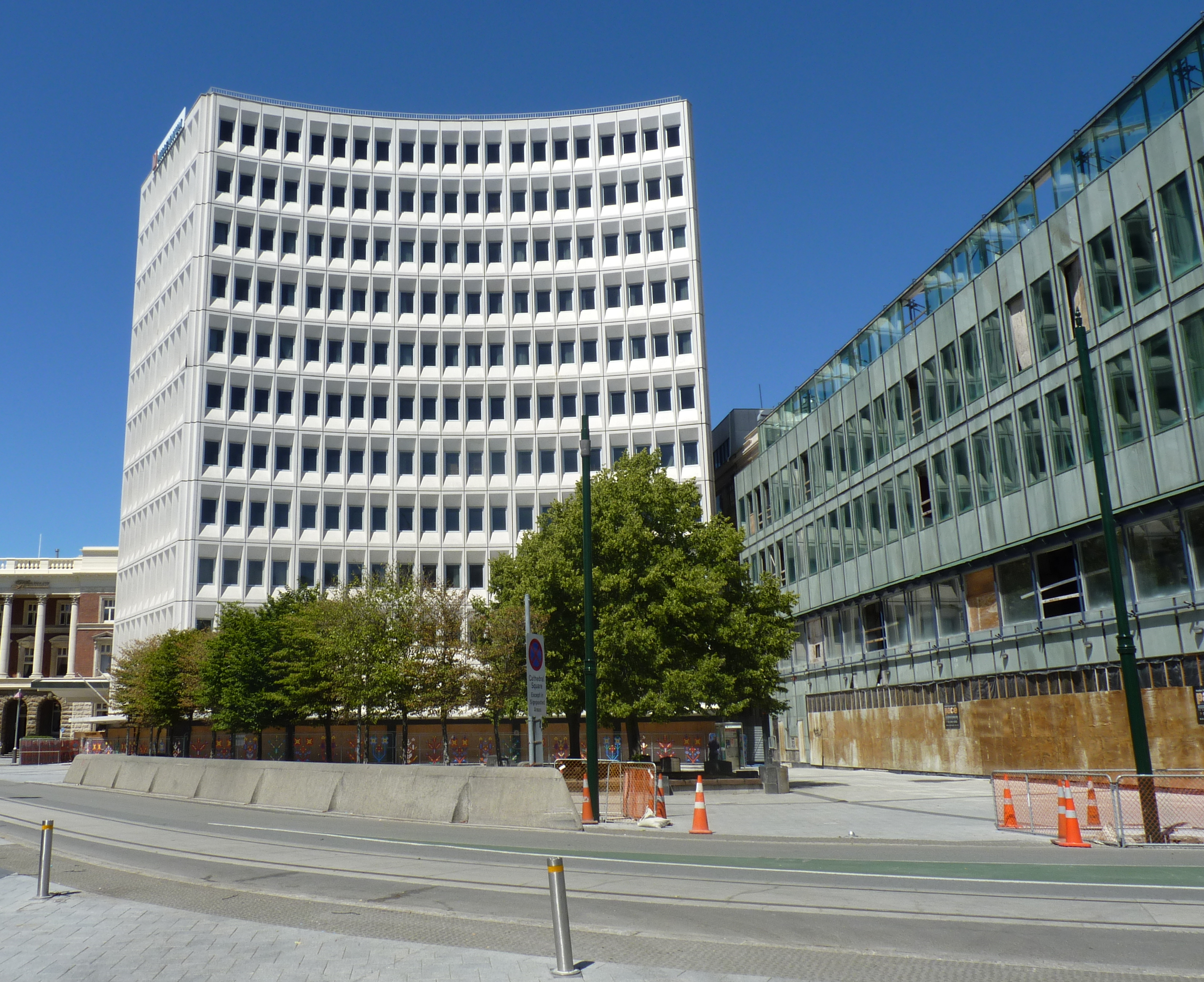
- The hotel in 2015
- Former names: Millennium Hotel

General information
- Coordinates: 43°31′53.43″S 172°38′15.28″E

Distinction Christchurch Hotel is a hotel in Cathedral Square of Christchurch, New Zealand. Previously named the Millennium Hotel, it was damaged in the 2011 Christchurch earthquake and underwent subsequent repairs. In 2016 the building was sold to the Distinction Group and re-opened in March 2018 as Distinction Christchurch. It is a five-star hotel as of 2012 and has 179 rooms.

== History ==
The building became damaged after the 2010 and 2011 Christchurch earthquakes occurred. Repairs began around August 2012 with an estimated completion time of 18 months. In February 2014 Millennium & Copthorne Hotels announced that the hotel would remain shut for the "foreseeable future" and reported a decrease in profit which it mainily attributed to the earthquake. By that time the company's Copthorne Hotel in Victoria Square had almost finished being demolished.

In 2016, the building was sold by its Singaporean owners to the Distinction Group, a New Zealand hotel chain operator. The hotel opened in March 2018 with the name Distinction Christchurch.

During the COVID-19 pandemic, the hotel was used as a managed isolation facility. In 2025, a 13-storey-high mural was painted on the side of the building by Jacob Ryan, becoming the largest mural in New Zealand, and surpassing the size of the one on the Park Tower in Grafton, Auckland.
