= COVID-19 managed isolation in New Zealand =

New Zealand quarantine system for COVID-19

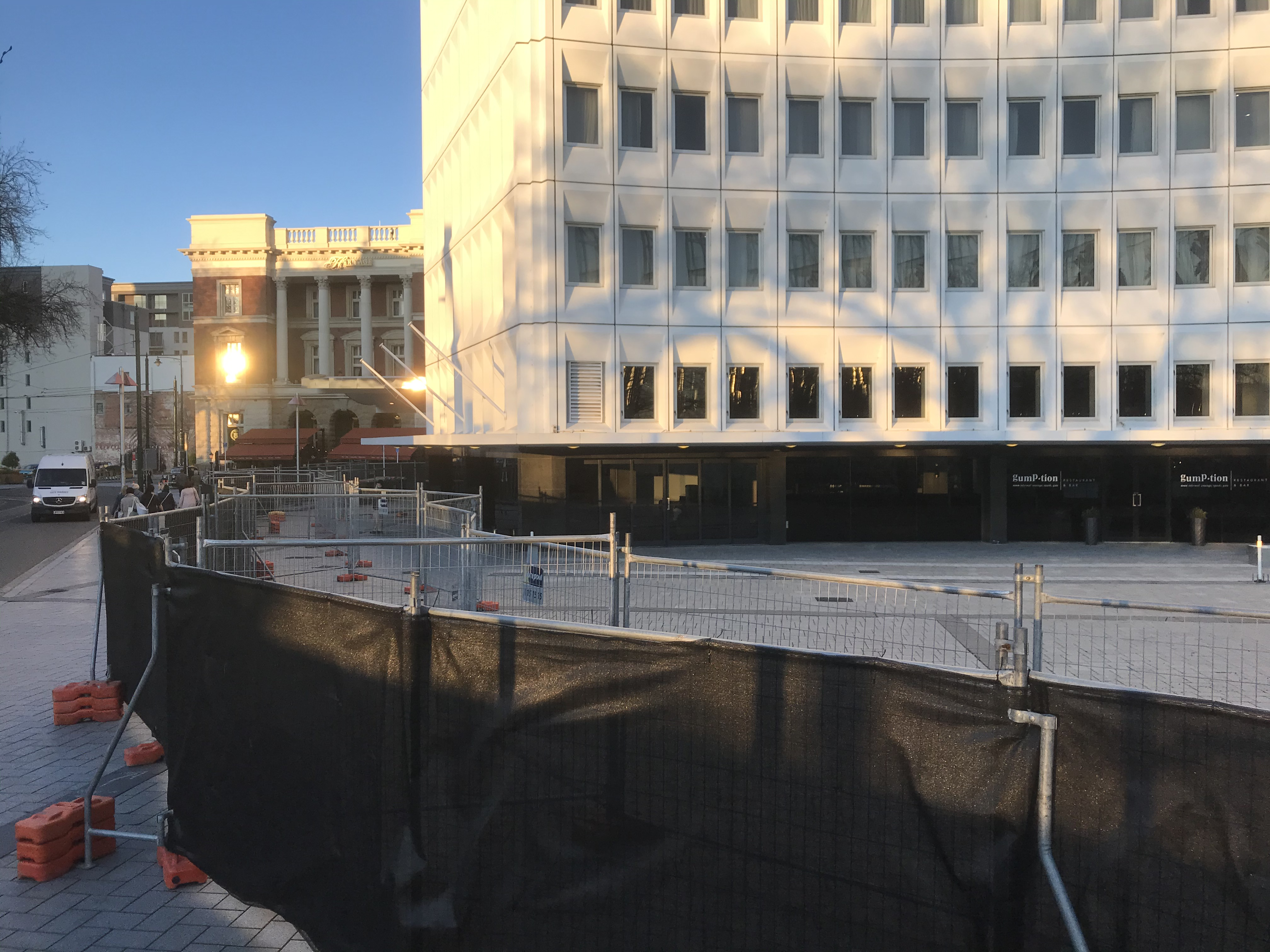
Distinction Christchurch in use as a managed isolation hotel

Managed isolation and quarantine (MIQ) was a quarantine system implemented by the New Zealand Government during the country's COVID-19 pandemic. Under the system, people entering New Zealand, COVID-19 positive cases and some of their close contacts were required to isolate at an MIQ facility for 14 days. Compulsory managed isolation and quarantine was announced by Prime Minister Jacinda Ardern at the 1pm press conference on 9 April 2020, with the system coming into effect for people boarding flights to New Zealand from midnight that day. The government contracted dozens of hotels in five cities that were exclusively used as managed isolation facilities. The task was organised by the Managed Isolation and Quarantine (MIQ) unit, part of the COVID-19 All-of-Government Response Group.

On 10 March 2022, the New Zealand Government announced plans to phase out the MIQ system as part of plans to reopen the country's borders. Most of the MIQ facilities would revert to being hotels. However, four facilities would be retained for those needing to quarantine. By March 2022, COVID-19 Response Minister Chris Hipkins estimated that the MIQ system had accommodated 230,000 people returning to New Zealand and 4,400 people who had contracted COVID-19 in the community.

== Background ==
On 28 February 2020, New Zealand confirmed its first case of COVID-19. At the daily 1 pm press conference on 14 March, Ardern announced that people entering New Zealand must go into a fortnight's self-isolation beginning on 16 March; people coming from Pacific Island nations were initially exempt from these restrictions. By mid-March, the government was urging New Zealanders to return home urgently.

== History ==
=== 2020 ===
At the daily 1 pm press conference on 9 April 2020, Ardern announced that those boarding flights after midnight that day would have to go into managed isolation provided by the government. She explained that government had been considering this measure for some time, but there simply was not the capacity to introduce these measures any earlier as almost 40,000 New Zealanders had returned since 20 March, a number larger than all the country's hotel rooms. Part of the announcement was that the government would use up to 18 hotels, but this was soon increased to 26 by early July and 32 by early August.

Three representatives of the Defence Force, Corrections, and Police undertook a review of the managed isolation system at the end of June. They found that little pre-planning had been done, with a Managed Isolation and Quarantine (MIQ) unit created as part of the COVID-19 All-of-Government Response Group on 20 March, without a lead agency assigned to have ultimate responsibility. For example, agencies involved prescribed different policies for personal protective gear for their staff. There was little government oversight of arriving passengers when they transferred through the arrival halls, with a risk of travellers meeting their family or even absconding. Some travellers found out that there is mandatory quarantine in New Zealand after they had cleared customs. There was initially little coordination with airlines, with passenger manifests provided only hours before planes arrived in New Zealand; this sometimes put strains on logistics, with last-minute decisions which hotel passengers would be sent to. The compulsory second test did sometimes not arrive in a timely manner, which meant that rooms did not become available, hindering planning for accommodating new guests.

In mid-June, Air Commodore Darryn Webb and Housing Minister Megan Woods were given joint responsibility for overseeing isolation and quarantine facilities. Woods and Webb announced a number of operational changes two days after the review was received.

On 14 July 2020, the Ministry of Business, Innovation and Employment (MBIE) assumed responsibility for running the country's Managed Isolation and Quarantine (MIQ) system.

From 5 October, anyone entering New Zealand was required to book a place at a MIQ facility using the Government's online Managed Isolation Allocation System. On the day of its launch, Stuff reported that the Managed Isolation Allocation System's website had collapsed with numerous people reporting trouble making bookings. From 12 am on 5 November, anyone entering New Zealand was legally required to show a voucher proving that they had secured a place in an MIQ facility before flying.

On 12 November, it was reported that MIQ guests at the Grand Millennium hotel in Auckland Central had mingled with residents of Vincent Residences after a fire alarm at the hotel earlier in the week. Following reports of a community transmission at Vincent Residences, Director of Public Health Dr Caroline McElnay said the alarm was not the likely cause of the community transmission because the case was already asymptomatic at the time. In addition, Air Commodore Darryn Webb disputed reports that MIQ guests had mingled with Vincent Residences.

=== 2021 ===
On 28 January 2021, the Pullman Hotel in Central Auckland was identified as the centre of an outbreak that had seen four people test positive for a South African strain. In response, COVID-19 Response Minister Chris Hipkins announced that the managed isolation facility would not be accepting new returnees and that remaining residents would have their stays extended. The Minister also confirmed that health authorities were investigating the causes of this new outbreak. On 29 January, a mother whose two daughters had stayed at the Pullman Hotel criticised lapses in protocols and safety including returnees mingling and playing contact sports, which she blamed for causing one of her daughters to contract COVID-19.

On 2 March 2021, the Government confirmed that it would be raising managed isolation booking fees for temporary visa holders by more than NZ$2,000 from 25 March. This price hike was criticised by the Migrant Workers Association's spokesperson Anu Kaloti and migrants residing in New Zealand with relatives overseas.

On 22 March, Radio New Zealand and The New Zealand Herald reported that the Managed Isolation and Quarantine system was receiving an average of 100 complaints a week due to lengthy wait-times; with people having to reserve rooms at least 16 weeks in advance. This led MIQ to consider a wait-list for peak times to manage the demand for places in MIQ.

On 23 March, the New Zealand Government announced that it had raised the time needed for New Zealand permanent residents and citizens to stay in New Zealand without incurring MIQ fees from 90 days to 180 days. In addition, the Government raised the accommodation fees for temporary visa holders (including partners, spouses, legal guardians and children of returning New Zealanders) and migrant health workers; with $950 for an additional adult in a room and $475 for a child aged 3–17 for those travelling together. If travelling separately, the temporary entry class visa holder would be charged the higher fees of $5520 for the first or only person in a room, $2990 for an additional adult, and $1610 for an additional child.

On 1 April, the Government confirmed that it would loosen rules for securing emergency spots in managed isolation; with the Ministry of Business, Innovation and Employment (MBIE) stating that 100 more places in MIQ would be available each fortnight. This policy shift affected New Zealand citizens and residents applying to enter the country to see relatives with terminal illnesses and less than six months to live; citizens and residents who had travelled overseas to visit terminally ill relatives; citizens and residents of Pacific Islands countries requiring time-critical medical treatment in New Zealand that they couldn't receive at home; and those facing risks to their health and safety overseas.

According to statistics released by the Health Ministry in early April 2021, there had been 117 imported cases from India in managed isolation since the start of February, compared with 17 from the United States and 11 from the United Kingdom. In response to this and the rising number of cases in India, the New Zealand Government announced that it would close the border to travellers from India between 4pm on 11 April (Sunday) and 28 April. This temporary travel ban would also affect New Zealand citizens and residents travelling from India.

On 13 April, it was reported that nearly all security guards at MIQ facilities were recruited from private security firms despite the Ministry of Business, Innovation and Employment (MBIE) deciding to employ its own security force following a privacy breach in August 2020. Following a recruitment drive by MBIE, it was reported that nearly 400 people had applied for 156 security officer vacancies at MIQ facilities. MBIE had also recruited 31 of 32 operations and security managers.

On 10 May, the Government announced that 500 spaces a fortnight would be allocated over the next ten months for skilled and critical workers. This would include 300 workers under the Recognised Seasonal Employer (RSE) scheme, with 2,400 expected to arrive by March 2022. Prior to that, ten percent of managed isolation places had been allocated to skilled and critical workers. Prime Minister Ardern confirmed that these spaces would include construction workers for the Auckland City Rail Link and Wellington's Transmission Gully Motorway. In addition, COVID-19 Response Minister Chris Hipkins said the travel bubble with Australia would allow more places in managed isolation to be allocated to skilled and critical workers.

The joint leadership roles of MIQ changed in June when New Zealand Army Brigadier Rose King replaced Brigadier Jim Bliss at the conclusion of his secondment to MBIE. She joined Megan Main as Joint Head of MIQ.

Following the New Zealand Government's suspension of the travel bubble with Australia at 11:59 pm on 23 July, the Government also confirmed that New Zealanders returning home from Australia except New South Wales before 11:59 pm on 30 July would not have to go into managed isolation. Those returning from Australia after 30 July would have to go into managed isolation.

On 2 August, Prime Minister Ardern announced that seasonal workers from Tonga, Samoa and Vanuatu would be allowed to enter the country without having to undergo managed isolation from September 2021 onwards. This was to address the labour shortage in the agricultural and horticultural sector. Tonga, Samoa and Vanuatu had reported low transmissions of COVID-19.

On 22 August, the Government began voluntary home isolation of suspected and verified community cases with available quarantine capacity used primarily to house healthy and COVID-19 free returnees.

On 25 August, Radio New Zealand reported that the number of MIQ rooms available to returning New Zealanders had declined due to a cohorting system that was introduced in April and May 2021 to minimise the risk of users spreading COVID-19 to later users. Between 350 and 500 MIQ rooms each fortnight were set aside for large groups such as sports teams, seasonal and construction workers, and refugees. Other factors affecting the availability of rooms including maintenance, an increase in the number of emergency allocation rooms from 250 to 350, and people not turning up for MIQ bookings.

On 1 September, COVID-19 Response Minister Hipkins confirmed that the Government had extended a pause on MIQ bookings to accommodate community cases from the Auckland August 2021 Delta outbreak. Hipkins also advised New Zealand expatriates abroad to cancel their holiday plans to return to New Zealand due to pressure on the MIQ system. On 2 September, the opposition National Party proposed five changes to the MIQ system including banning bots and third party providers, creating a new points system to allocate space, the introduction of a waiting list, transparency over room release dates, and the establishment of a Kiwi Expat Advisory Group.

A poll in September 2021 found the public overwhelmingly supported the elimination strategy – 85% of the population.<Kiwis back Covid elimination strategy: poll>. MIQ was one of the primary methods preventing introduction and subsequent community spread of Covid-19.

On 27 September, Ardern announced that the Government would be launching a home isolation trial for 150 selected travellers. Expressions of interest would be open from 30 September to 8 December. Participants must be New Zealand residents. In addition, Ardern confirmed that the quarantine-free travel for Pacific Recognised Seasonal Employer workers from Vanuatu, Samoa, and Tonga would resume in early October to address the agricultural and horticultural sectors' demand for migrant workers over the summer period.

In October 2021, the Delta variant began spreading widely in New Zealand with community cases quickly outpacing cases detected at the border. By 22 October, the country had recorded a record of 129 new community cases. On 4 October, the Government abandoned New Zealand's elimination strategy, citing its failure to contained the Delta variant outbreak that began in Auckland in August 2021.

On 21 October, the Government confirmed that repatriation flights carrying New Zealand citizens who had been deported from Australia under Section 501(3A) of the Australian Migration Act 1958 would resume in November 2021 following a three-month hiatus. The Government had contracted a designated MIQ facility to host these returnees.

On 28 October, COVID-19 Response Minister Hipkins announced that international arrivals would only have to isolate for seven days from 14 November in an effort to free up about 1,500 rooms a month. From 8 November, fully vaccinated travellers from low-risk Pacific Island countries such as the Cook Islands would be eligible for quarantine-free travel.

On 24 November, Hipkins announced that MIQ border restrictions would be eased in a three-stage process over 2022:

- From 17 January, all fully vaccinated New Zealanders and other eligible travellers could travel to New Zealand from Australia without having to go through managed isolation and quarantine.
- From 14 February, all fully vaccinated New Zealanders and other eligible travellers could travel to New Zealand from all other countries without having to go through MIQ.
- From 30 April, all fully vaccinated foreign travellers could travel to New Zealand without having to go through MIQ.

On 21 December 2021, Hipkins announced that the Government would be delaying the planned reopening of the country's border to the end of February 2022 in order to combat the spread of the SARS-CoV-2 Omicron variant. In addition, the length of stay at MIQ facilities for all travellers was raised to ten days, with no self-isolation component. Hipkins also announced that the Government would treat everyone on an international flight with a positive case as a close contact.

=== 2022 ===
On 18 January, Hipkins postponed the next MIQ lottery due to a tenfold increase in Omicron cases detected at the border. Grounded Kiwis member and Australian–based expatriate Maxine Strydom stated that the Government's decision would cause New Zealanders stranded abroad emotional and mental stress since many were facing expiring visas and job losses. While health economist Professor Paula Lorgelly expressed disappointment with the suspension, she said that she understood the Government's decision, describing it as "a short-term pain for what I perceive to be quite a long-term gain."

In mid–January 2022, The New Zealand Herald reported that a family of four had entered New Zealand without MIQ vouchers, having arrived on a transit ticket to Fiji. That same day, Kiwiblog published a guest post by Auckland Barrister Tudor Clee outlining the method to enter New Zealand without obtaining an MIQ voucher prior.

On 21 January, Stuff reported that an online group for New Zealanders stranded overseas was suggesting that New Zealanders could skip the MIQ process by posing as transit passengers traversing through New Zealand. While the Head of MIQ operations Melissa Ross described attempts to enter the country without an MIQ voucher as "selfish acts" that would strain the country's MIQ system, the lawyer Arran Hunt argued that these returning travelers' actions were not illegal since Section 18 of the New Zealand Bill of Rights Act 1990 granted all New Zealand citizens the right to enter the country.

On 3 February, Ardern announced that the country's borders would be reopened in five stages throughout 2022. Under this arrangement, vaccinated New Zealanders and eligible travellers would be able to go into self-isolation and undergo testing on arrival rather than having to enter MIQ:

1. 11.59pm, 27 February: Self-isolation opens for New Zealanders and eligible travellers coming from Australia. The self isolation period would last for ten days.
2. 11.59pm, 13 March: Open to New Zealanders and eligible travellers from the rest of the world; skilled workers earning at least 1.5x median wage; working holiday visa holders. The self isolation period would last for seven days.
3. 11.59pm, 12 April: Offshore temporary visa holders who still meet visa requirements; 5,000 international students; consideration of class exemptions for critical workers who do not meet the 1.5x median wage test. The self isolation period would last for seven days.
4. July: Anyone from Australia; visa-waiver travellers; the introduction of new Accredited Employer Work Visa, and the phasing out of skilled worker exemptions.
5. October: Border reopens to visa categories from the rest of the world.

Unvaccinated travellers would still be required to go into MIQ facilities. While the Government planned to phase out MIQ and gradually convert facilities back into hotels and motels, it still planned to maintain a core quarantine capacity in the form of a National Quarantine Service.

In response to the Government's announcement, University of Otago epidemiologist Professor Michael Baker cautiously welcomed the self isolation provision but expressed concerns about supervision. University of Otago senior lecturer Dr Lesley Gray expressed support for a staged reopening since 94% of the population was double vaccinated but expressed concerns about safeguarding unvaccinated children and the vulnerable. University of Canterbury professor Michael Plank opined that a staged border reopening would help mitigate the risk of a huge jump in cases. By contrast, Dr Emily Harvey, a senior consultant/researcher at Market Economics Ltd and principal investigator with Te Pūnaha Matatini, expressed concern that the proposed rapid antigen testing regime of doing two tests between six days was insufficient and would miss a large number of infections. The National Party welcomed the planned reopening of the border while the ACT party called for the abolition of MIQ. The Green Party urged the Government to support Māori and Pasifika vaccination efforts while advocating for the free distribution of N95 or equivalent masks.

On 17 February, the Ministry of Business, Innovation and Employment amended the public health risk assessment tool to allow more people to be released from MIQ on compassionate grounds. These included more applications for allowing people travel between islands and approving applications featuring children. This amendment was approved by Director-General of Health Ashley Bloomfield.

On 28 February, Ardern announced that the New Zealand Cabinet had decided, based on advice from the epidemiologist David Skegg's team, that vaccinated travellers entering the country would no longer need to self-isolate from 11.59pm on 2 March. This decision was balanced with other factors including the gradual reopening of New Zealand's borders and rising community cases. All travellers would be required to undergo rapid antigen testing within 24 hours and on the fifth or sixth day of their arrival. In addition, the Government accelerated its plans to reopen the border. New Zealanders and other eligible critical workers would be able to enter the country from 11:59pm on 4 March. Due to immigration processes, non-New Zealanders on temporary visas including working holiday visa holders and Recognised Seasonal Employer workers who were part of the second stage of the Government's reopening plan would be eligible to enter New Zealand from 13 March without having to self-isolate. Prior to the Government's announcement, the advocacy group "Grounded Kiwis (which represented New Zealanders stranded abroad by border restrictions) had questioned the rationale for retaining the MIQ system in the light of rising community cases.

On 10 March, Hipkins announced that all but four of the country's 32 MIQ facilities would revert to being hotels by the end of June 2022. Four MIQ facilities would remain for those needing to undergo managed isolation. Hipkins indicated that the Government had plans to maintain some managed isolation capacity in the form of either hotels or purpose-built quarantine facilities. With the winding-down of the MIQ network, 300 healthcare workers and nurses, 230 police, and 600 Defence Force personnel returned to their roles in the health, defence and police workforces. By March 2022, Hipkins estimated that the MIQ system had accommodated 230,000 people returning to New Zealand and 4,400 people who had contracted COVID-19 in the community.

In mid–April, Radio New Zealand and 1News reported that the Director of Public Health Caroline McElnay and Director-General of Health Ashley Bloomfield had agreed in late November 2021 that MIQ was no longer justified since the risk of COVID-19 transmission by international arrivals was no longer higher than domestic transmissions; citing a secret Ministry of Health memo. The memo had advised the Government to speed up the reopening of New Zealand's border. However, the Government had delayed opening the border until 2 March 2022. In response to media coverage of the memo, Grounded Kiwis spokesperson Martin Newell and National Party leader Christopher Luxon criticised the Government's decision to delay reopening the border to stranded citizens, residents and temporary visa holders. Hipkins, Ardern and Baker defended the Government's decision to delay reopening New Zealand's border, arguing that it gave health authorities enough time to boost vaccination rates and to delay the spread of Omicron.

On 3 May 2022, Hipkins announced that unvaccinated visa holders, permanent residents, and Australian citizens residing in New Zealand would be able to travel to and from the country without having to undergo MIQ. He justified the New Zealand Government's decision on the basis of the lower health risks of overseas transmission and New Zealand's high vaccination rate. That same day, MBIE confirmed that the country's four remaining MIQ facilities in Auckland and Christchurch would close by August 2022 due to the low number of people using them. The Head of MIQ, Andy Milne, justified the closure on the basis that people entering New Zealand were no longer required to enter MIQ. According to 1News, there were only 94 people using 54 rooms across the four facilities in early May 2022.

In mid-December 2022, Newsroom reported that two New Zealand citizens who entered New Zealand on transit tickets in January 2022 had been subject to enforcement by Police and fined $1000. Barrister Tudor Clee defended the case pro bono and the fines were dismissed by the Court. The Court ruled that they were legally entitled to enter the country as New Zealand citizens. That same month, Newshub reported that the New Zealand Government had considered charging citizens using the transit method to enter New Zealand with an imprisonable offence of up to six months in jail or a NZ$12,000 fine. Prime Minister Ardern had defended the consideration of imprisonment on the grounds that those using the transit method were causing "so much distress for those already using the system." After the media broke the story about people entering New Zealand via the "transit route," the Government panicked, and a panel consisting of Crown Law, multiple ministries and advisors accepted that they could not stop the route.

== List of managed isolation hotels ==
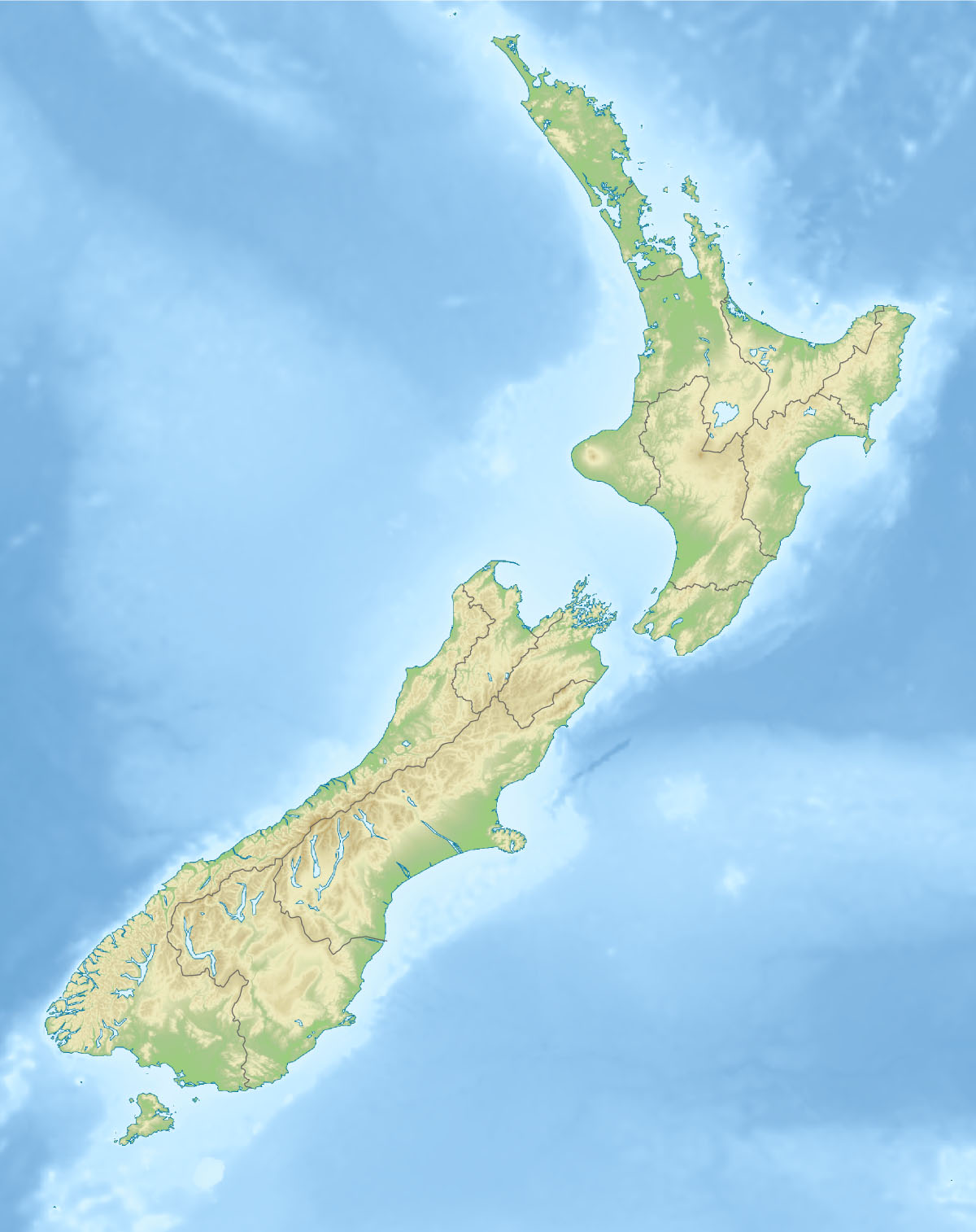
Location of managed isolation hotels in New Zealand

The following hotels were used as managed isolation facilities:

hotel name	image	Location	Comments
Crowne Plaza Auckland		Auckland	
Four Points by Sheraton		Auckland	
Grand Mercure Auckland		Auckland	
Grand Millennium		Auckland	
Haka Hotel Newmarket		Auckland	until early July 2020
Ibis Ellerslie		Auckland	
M Social		Auckland	
Novotel Ellerslie		Auckland	
Pullman Hotel		Auckland	
Ramada Auckland		Auckland	until 1 September 2020
Rydges Auckland		Auckland	
Sebel Manukau		Auckland	
SO/ Auckland		Auckland	
Stamford Plaza		Auckland	
Waipuna Hotel and Conference Centre		Auckland	
Holiday Inn Auckland Airport		Auckland Airport	
Jet Park Hotel		Auckland Airport	
Naumi Auckland Airport		Auckland Airport	
Novotel Auckland Airport		Auckland Airport	
Sudima Auckland Airport		Auckland Airport	
Chateau on the Park		Christchurch	
Crowne Plaza Christchurch		Christchurch	from 18 August 2020
Distinction Christchurch Hotel		Christchurch	
Commodore Hotel		Christchurch Airport	
Novotel Christchurch Airport		Christchurch Airport	
Sudima Christchurch Airport		Christchurch Airport	
Distinction Hotel Te Rapa		Hamilton	
Ibis Tainui		Hamilton	
Jet Park Hotel		Hamilton	
Ibis Rotorua		Rotorua	
Rydges Rotorua		Rotorua	
Sudima Rotorua		Rotorua	
Grand Mercure		Wellington	
Bay Plaza Hotel		Wellington	

== Impact ==
=== Number of deaths caused by Covid-19 pandemic ===
Throughout the Covid-19 pandemic, New Zealand had one of the lowest pandemic mortality (death) rates in the world.

Introduction and community spread of Covid-19 into the New Zealand population was largely prevented by MIQ until early 2022. This allowed the majority of the population to get vaccinated before widespread community transmission started occurring, saving thousands of lives. University of Otago epidemiologist Michael Baker stated MIQ likely saved at least 10,000 lives.

=== Economic impact ===
From April 2020 to 29 September 2021, the MIQ system hosted 175,422 guests and played an important role in securing New Zealand's borders from transitioning cases with COVID-19. MIQ propped up the accommodation sector of the New Zealand economy, making extensive use of hotel facilities (which lost access to the formerly extensive international tourism market) and providing employment for New Zealanders.

On 17 November, the Government disclosed that it had failed to collect invoices worth at least NZ$36 million for MIQ stays. The New Zealand Herald also reported that an Ōpōtiki woman had been pursued by debt collectors over a NZ$4,000 bill for an MIQ stay that she never had due to mistaken identity.

On 22 June 2022, Radio New Zealand reported that the Ministry of Business, Innovation and Employment had spent nearly NZ$800 million on leasing agreements with 33 hotels repurposed for MIQ usage between October 2020 and March 2022.

=== Mental health ===
According to a Radio New Zealand report published on 1 October 2021, psychologists reported emerging evidence of long-term and in some cases "severe" effects on individuals who had spent time in managed isolation and quarantine, caused by a lack of autonomy, social contact and control over their environment.

In late January 2022, an Auckland builder named Paul Mullaly described the MIQ system as "cruel and inhumane" after failing to secure a place in order to visit his mother prior to her death in New Zealand. Mullaly, who is based in Ireland, was only able to watch his mother's last moments via video conference.

On 17 February 2022, a survey commissioned by advocacy group "Grounded Kiwis" claimed that 78% of respondents reported that the MIQ system had an adverse impact on their physical and mental health. Of these respondents, 70 percent experienced stress, 63 percent experienced anxiety, 35 percent experienced depression, 32 percent experienced insomnia, and 12 percent experienced panic attacks. The results of the survey were released to the news broadcaster Newshub.

Following the downsizing of the MIQ system, Stuff reported in early April 2022 that the New Zealand Defence Force's two-year deployment in Operation Protect to manage the country's border facilities had contributed to rising attrition rates, low morale, and stress among military personnel. According to figures released by the Defence Force, the New Zealand Army's attrition rate had risen from 9% in February 2021 to 13.7% in February 2022. In addition, 7,600 personnel who had participated in Operation Protect underwent mental health screening while 1,800 personnel were referred to a mental health psychologist.

== Issues ==
=== Accessibility ===
There were periods where demand for accommodation spots at Managed Isolation and Quarantine facilities outstripped the number of rooms available. On 20 September 2021, Stuff reported that 26,000 people were competing for 3,000 MIQ spaces listed on the Ministry of Business, Innovation and Employment website's "virtual lobby" allowing entry to New Zealand in November and December 2021. In mid-September 2021, Julie South of the veterinary recruitment agency VetStaff launched a petition calling for the Government to set aside two MIQ spaces each week for overseas-based veterinarians in order to address the shortage of veterinarians in New Zealand.

Difficulties for border-crossers in securing places in MIQ facilities attracted media and public attention. In early October, The Southland Times reported that Southland Hospital's maternity unit might be downgraded since its director, Dr Jim Faherty, who had been granted compassionate leave to visit his ill parents in the United States, was unable to secure a place in MIQ. On 6 October, a pregnant Auckland woman named Sami filed a legal challenge against MBIE's decision to deny her stranded husband an MIQ voucher so that he could care for her and their child. According to Stuff, the MIQ system had received 229 applications involving a pregnant woman since 30 October 2020. However, there were no specific emergency allocation criteria for pregnant women or their partners who were stuck overseas. Sami sought to change that policy.

On 20 October 2021, the Chief Ombudsman Peter Boshier launched an independent investigation into the MIQ system after receiving 200 complaints about the system. According to Boshier, the complaints fit into four broad categories: "they claim the allocation system is unlawful, unfit for purpose, unfair, and poorly managed."

On 22 June 2022, The New Zealand Herald reported that the Government would investigate the allocation of emergency MIQ spots during COVID-19 lockdown restrictions, with particular attention to the treatment of pregnant women wanting to return to New Zealand to give birth.

On 12 December 2022, Ombudsman Boshier released his findings into the MIQ allocation system. His report found that MBIE acted "unreasonably" while implementing some parts of the MIQ system during the COVID-19 pandemic and that Government officials did not acknowledge the impact that the allocation system (used during the periods when demand outstripped supply) would have on people's lives. Boshier also found that the MIQ voucher system did not meet the needs of New Zealanders who had a genuine or urgent need to travel nor those experiencing delays in returning to New Zealand. In addition, there were no provisions for disabled people to independently apply for vouchers. In response to the Onbudsman's report, Grounded Kiwis spokesperson Martin Newell endorsed the reports' findings, stating that the Government "failed to develop a system that took more account of personal circumstance, as a result of that the process of booking an MIQ spot caused a lot of heartache for a lot of individuals."

Despite the issues identified, Ombudsman Peter Boshier also stated in his report that "MBIE did not act unreasonably with respect to: A – its efforts to increase MIQ capacity, given the limitations imposed by public health settings and workforce constraints; and B – the use of available capacity in MIQ, with rooms being empty at times for unavoidable reasons." His report further stated "I acknowledge the difficult challenges that MBIE faced in managing MIQ, and the vital role that MIQ played in the Government's response to the COVID-19 pandemic. MBIE provided a large volume of advice to Ministers at pace, in unprecedented circumstances, and in a high-stakes and constantly changing environment where the risk to public health was high."

==== Charlotte Bellis ====
In late January 2022, former Al Jazeera journalist Charlotte Bellis unsuccessfully attempted to secure a place in the MIQ lottery after becoming pregnant with her partner Jim Huylebroek, a photographer and contributor to The New York Times. Due to Qatar's laws penalising extramarital pregnancy, Bellis had left Qatar. Since she was unable to stay on a long-term basis in Huylebroek's native Belgium, the couple had travelled to Afghanistan, where they had visas to live, and sought help from the Taliban. Bellis publicised her ordeal in an open letter published in The New Zealand Herald. Besides the New Zealand media, Bellis' case was covered by several international media including The Guardian, GB News, The Washington Post, ABC News, and the Sydney Morning Herald. In response to media coverage, Chris Bunny, the head of the MIQ system, confirmed that staff had advised Bellis about making a second application that would meet the requirements for emergency travel. Bellis' situation was highlighted by ACT Party leader David Seymour, National Party COVID-19 Response spokesperson Chris Bishop, and GB News presenter Dan Wooton as an example of the perceived "cruelty" of the MIQ system.

After COVID-19 Response Minister Chris Hipkins alleged that Bellis had spurned a Government offer for a place in emergency allocation, Bellis' lawyer Tudor Clee accused Hipkins of breaching her privacy. She also questioned the effectiveness of the emergency allocation system, citing the low success rate for pregnant women. According to The New Zealand Herald, only 29 of the emergency allocation applications involving a pregnancy that were submitted between 1 June 2021 and 1 February 2022 were approved. 65 applications were declined while 118 were cancelled by applicants or were not processed since they were incomplete. The Herald also reported that MIQ had approved 5,396 of the 8,863 emergency allocation applications submitted between 30 October 2020 and 23 January 2022.

On 1 February 2022, Deputy Prime Minister Grant Robertson confirmed that the Ministry of Business, Innovation and Employment had offered Bellis and Huylebroek places in managed isolation. Bellis accepted the Government's offer but reiterated that she would continue to challenge the Government's MIQ system.

In mid-June 2022, Hipkins publicly apologised for releasing personal information without Bellis' consent and making "inaccurate comments" about Bellis travelling to Afghanistan and being offered consular assistance by the New Zealand authorities. Hipkins had earlier apologised in private to Bellis in mid-March 2022. Bellis accepted Hipkins' apology and stated she would continue to challenge the MIQ system.

=== Quality issues ===
On 3 September 2021 a mother who tested positive for COVID-19 drew media attention after verbally abusing staff members and military personnel at the Novotel & Ibis Ellerslie MIQ facility. The woman had experienced stress and anxiety since entering into managed isolation earlier in the week with her two children. She was also frustrated by delays in the time that staff took to provide food and medicine to her and her children. The woman had posted several Facebook Live videos about her ordeal. In response, Brigadier Rose King apologised for the poor quality of the service but criticised the woman for verbally abusing staff and potentially exposing them to COVID-19. As a result, two staff members have entered into self-isolation while other staff have not returned to work due to fears about their own safety. The family was subsequently transferred by MIQ staff to a different MIQ facility.

On 4 September, the management of the Sudima Hotel Auckland Airport facility apologised to the Quellin family after specks of urine and hair were found on the toilet seat within the family's room, but insisted they had followed normal sanitisation protocols. Mrs Quellin and her infant child had recently returned from a trip to Germany to visit her terminally-ill mother.

On 7 October 2021, a Jewish MIQ guest at a Christchurch facility complained that frozen kosher meals were unfit for human consumption. In response, an MIQ facility said the team at the facility in Christchurch has solicited advice on how to best meet the requirements of a kosher diet.

=== Breaches and incidents ===
==== 2020 ====
On 5 July 2020, it was reported that a woman who had escaped managed isolation at the Pullman Hotel in Auckland had been apprehended and charged with breaching the 14-day isolation period under the COVID-19 Public Health Response Act 2020. The woman had arrived from Australia on 27 June.

On 8 July, a 32-year-old man, who had arrived from India, was charged with violating Section 26 (1) of the COVID-19 Public Health Response Act 2020 after he escaped managed isolation at the Stamford Plaza Hotel in central Auckland. He visited the Countdown supermarket in Victoria Street before being located by security guards after 70 minutes. After the man tested positive for COVID-19, the supermarket closed temporarily, with its staff entering into self-isolation.

On 10 July a man was arrested for violating the COVID-19 Public Health Response Act 2020 after he had cut through a fence at a managed-isolation facility at Distinction Hotel in Hamilton and visited a liquor store the previous night. The man had tested negative for COVID-19 and was later identified as a 52-year-old Queenstown resident, who had returned from Sydney on 1 July. On 27 August the Hamilton District Court sentenced him to 40 hours' community service and ordered him to pay NZ$1,000 in reparations for damaging a flat-screen television set in his room.

On 11 July a man in his 60s escaped a managed-isolation facility at Waipuna Hotel in Auckland and knocked on the doors of three residents outside the facility. He was subsequently picked up by police and placed under armed guard at Waipuna Hotel.

On 25 July it was reported that authorities had detained a family of five (comprising a mother and four children aged 12, 16, 17, and 18) for breaching managed isolation at the Distinction Hotel in Hamilton. The family had arrived from Brisbane in Australia on 21 July in order to attend a relative's funeral in Auckland. While the family's application for an exemption was being processed by the Health Ministry, they had escaped by breaking a window and scaling a fence. Police apprehended four members of the family in a nearby park, while the 17-year old had travelled to Auckland where he was detained by police there. Government minister Woods criticised the family breaking the rules, stating that "while we can understand their grief we can not let one tragedy to turn into a tragedy of hundreds". Four members of the family were charged with breaching a Health Act notice. On 28 August, the mother and her 18-year-old daughter were sentenced to 14 days imprisonment by Judge Noel Sainsbury of the Auckland District Court. The mother and her daughter's harsher sentence in comparison to a 52-year-old man in Hamilton who was sentenced to no jail time raised questions about alleged "systematic racism" in the New Zealand justice system against Māori. New Zealand Public Party leader Billy Te Kahika has advocated on behalf of the woman and her family, also claiming credit for getting her sentence reduced by seven days.

On 30 July a 32-year-old man who had travelled from Brisbane was apprehended following a failed attempt to breach managed isolation at the Crowne Plaza in central Auckland. The man was charged under the COVID-19 Public Health Response Act.

On 14 October a 22-year-old woman was charged with allegedly trying to escape from Auckland's Grand Millennium Hotel during three incidents in October 2020.

On 11 November the West Indies cricket team were denied further training privileges after members breached managed-isolation rules by mingling and sharing food while in managed isolation at the "Chateau in the Park" hotel in Christchurch.

==== 2021 ====
On 29 January 2021 a staff member at Auckland's Grand Millennium Hotel was dismissed after a 20-minute "encounter" with a returnee in managed isolation.

On 7 February the final 60 returnees at the Pullman Managed Isolation Facility completed their health checks and were released. The facility planned a deep clean per infection prevention and its systems will be reviewed.

On 23 February an Australian traveller named Lucinda Baulch was released after spending 28 days in managed isolation in Wellington while refusing to take a COVID-19 test. The woman had attended an anti-lockdown protest in Melbourne in November 2020. National Party leader Judith Collins called for the deportation of the woman back to Australia.

In early June 2021 New Zealand authorities placed three Melbourne residents in managed isolation after they entered New Zealand without informing authorities that they had circumvented a two-week lockdown in Melbourne by driving to Sydney and then flying to Auckland. The three individuals had intended to attend a funeral in New Zealand.

On 17 June 2021 Radio New Zealand reported that 12 travellers from Samoa at the Crowne Park managed-isolation facility in Auckland had breached managed isolation by socialising on three occasions despite receiving warnings. All 12 remained with the threat of an extended MIQ stay if anyone in the group were to test positive for COVID-19; four received a police warning.

On 2 September a COVID-19 "community" case absconded from the Novotel & Ibis Ellerslie MIQ facility in Auckland and returned to his home. Police detained the man following a 12-hour manhunt. He later appeared in court via phone and was charged with breaching a COVID-19 public-health order. He was bailed back to the Novotel facility. The National Party's COVID-19 spokesperson Chris Bishop sought an investigation by the Government into delays by MIQ staff and police in reporting and responding to the individual's escape. The man's mother, known as "Mele", confirmed that she had alerted the authorities to her son's escape and apologised for his actions.

On 4 September, a man made two attempts to access the Stamford Plaza quarantine facility in Auckland, but was discovered by staff. Police issued the man with two warnings for unlawfully accessing the property and breaching COVID-19 lockdown rules.

On 20 October, joint head of MIQ Brigadier Rose King confirmed that three COVID-19 positive community cases staying at the Holiday Inn hotel near Auckland Airport had allegedly absconded the previous night. Two of the men were apprehended while one remained at large.

=== Legal challenges ===
In early September 2021, a pregnant New Zealand woman named Bergen Graham filed a legal challenge against the Health Minister Andrew Little and the Ministry of Business, Innovation and Employment after making six unsuccessful attempts to secure a place in MIQ through the voucher system. Graham, who was living in El Salvador, had sought to return to New Zealand since February 2021 due to her high risk pregnancy stemming from a blood condition. MBIE subsequently granted her a place in MIQ, leading her to drop her legal challenge. However, Graham's lawyer Francis Joychild QC confirmed that other plaintiffs would continue with their legal actions over MIQ bookings on the grounds that the MIQ system was breaching Section 18 of the New Zealand Bill of Rights Act 1990.

On 8 October 2021, an advocacy group called "Grounded Kiwis" filed a judicial review claim in the High Court against the Health Minister Little, COVID-19 Response Minister Chris Hipkins, and the Chief Executive of MBIE claiming that they had they acted "unlawfully and unreasonably" in the design and operation of the MIQ system." Grounded Kiwis spokesperson Alexandra Birt alleged that the Government had failed to protect the rights of New Zealanders to enter the country and claimed that the "first-in-first served" allocation system breached Section 18(2) of the Bill of Rights Act 1990. The group was represented by Wellington barristers Paul Radich QC and Lucila van Dam, barristers of Clifton Chambers law firm in Wellington. Grounded Kiwis also filed to be an incorporated society representing New Zealanders affected by the MIQ system. By 10 October, Grounded Kiwis had raised more than NZ$72,000 through a Givealittle fundraising campaign.

On 14 December, Grounded Kiwis submitted a petition with 22,888 signatures to the New Zealand Parliament, calling for the MIQ system to better align with the Bill of Rights. The group was received by the National Party's COVID-19 Response spokesperson Chris Bishop, ACT Party leader David Seymour and Green Party Member of Parliament Elizabeth Kerekere. Bishop described the MIQ allocation system as a "lottery of human misery that had gone on far too long" while Seymour described the current MIQ situation as "verging on a form of torture." Kerekere stated that the MIQ situation "was not just a Bill of Rights issue, but also of the Treaty of Waitangi."

On 27 April 2022, High Court Justice Jill Mallon ruled in favour on some grounds of Grounded Kiwis' legal challenge against the MIQ system. Mallon found that certain aspects of the MIQ system – such as the "virtual lobby" and the inability to take applicants' personal circumstances into account – breached the Bill of Rights Act 1990. Other issues identified included the limited supply of spaces and the strict criteria for emergency allocation. However, Justice Mallon agreed with medical experts that MIQ had played a vital role in achieving the Government's public health objectives, and said over the period the judicial review focused on – between 1 September and 17 December 2021 – the requirements to have a voucher for MIQ did not amount to an unjustified infringement. She also said that the requirement to isolate in one of the MIQ facilities was within reasonable and proportionate limits. "Other options would not sufficiently have achieved the public health objectives the Government had legitimately determined to pursue."

== See also ==
- Timeline of the COVID-19 pandemic in New Zealand
