= North Shore Hospital =

Hospital in Auckland, New Zealand

- Te Whatu Ora
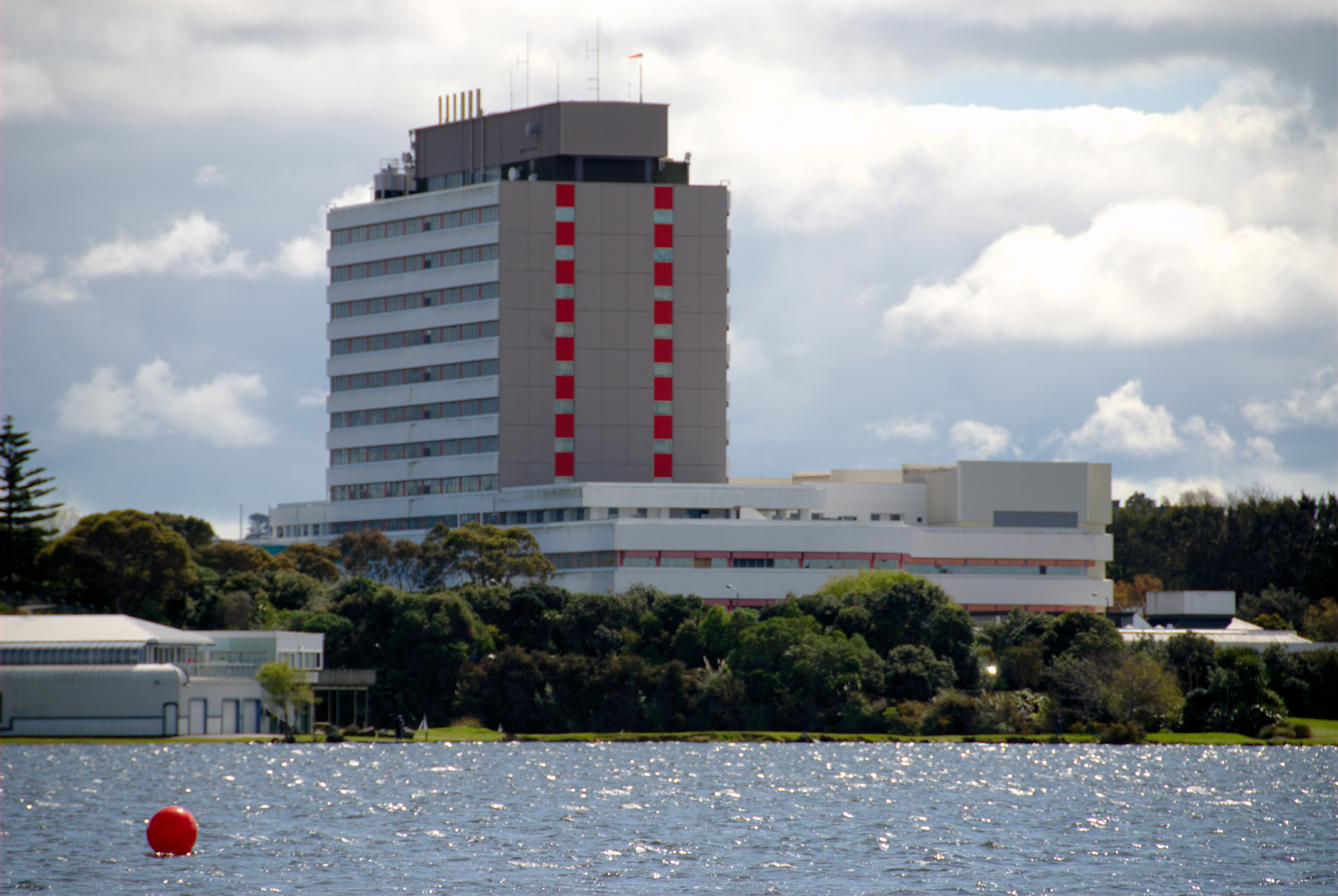
- View of North Shore Hospital across the adjacent Lake Pupuke

Geography
- Location: North Shore, Auckland, New Zealand
- Coordinates: 36.781139°S 174.757397°E

Organisation
- Type: Teaching
- Affiliated university: University of Auckland

Services
- Emergency department: Yes
- Beds: 663
- Speciality: Tertiary care

History
- Founded: 1956 as a maternity hospital, 1984 as tertiary hospital

Links
- Website: waitematadhb.govt.nz
- Lists: Hospitals in New Zealand

North Shore Hospital is a large public hospital in Takapuna, New Zealand, serving the northern part of Auckland. Located on Shakespeare Road near Lake Pupuke, it is administered by the Northern division of Te Whatu Ora. The hospital provides health services to residents of the North Shore, Waitakere and Rodney District. The hospital is a teaching hospital and part of the University of Auckland's Waitematā clinical campus.

The hospital began as a maternity hospital. The Auckland Hospital Board bought the Shakespeare Road site in the 1940s, and the North Shore Obstetric Hospital opened in 1958 with 44 maternity beds and a small emergency department. The main Tower Block opened in 1984, and the hospital became a general tertiary acute hospital. A cardiology centre opened in 2011 and an elective surgery centre in 2013.

North Shore Hospital has often been under pressure from high demand and limited resources. In 2007 it repeatedly reported full occupancy and trouble finding enough staff. Some people claimed the hospital received less funding per person than others because its catchment area is relatively wealthy, and the funding formula takes that into account. The Emergency Department at North Shore see more than 46,000 patients each year. An assessment and diagnostic unit opened in 2011 to ease crowding in the emergency department. The share of patients admitted, discharged or transferred within six hours rose from 61% in 2009 to 95% in 2013. In 2024 patients were again waiting on trolleys in corridors because there were too few inpatient beds, and staff reported more aggression, which was linked to pressure on resources.

== History ==
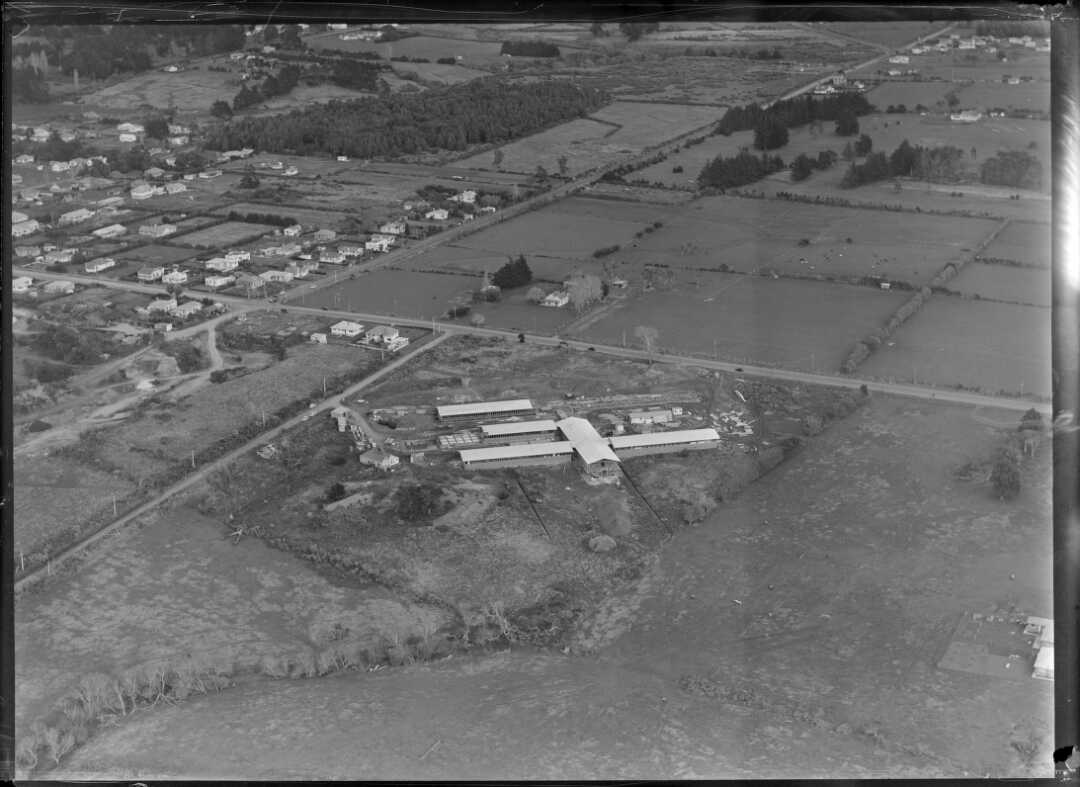
Aerial view of North Shore Hospital under construction in 1956

=== North Shore Obstetric Hospital ===
Planning for a hospital on the North Shore began in the 1940s, when the Auckland Hospital Board bought land on Shakespeare Road in Takapuna. Construction commenced in the 1950s and the North Shore Obstetric Hospital was officially opened by Prime Minister Walter Nash in 1958. Costing £350,000, it had 44 Maternity beds and a small emergency department of 6 beds.

=== The General Hospital ===
The main Tower Block of North Shore Hospital in Auckland, New Zealand was officially opened on April 2, 1984, by the then Prime Minister, Rt Hon David Lange. The hospital became a general tertiary acute hospital.

November 2011 saw the opening of the Lakeview Cardiology Centre.

The Elective Surgery Centre was opened by Minister of Health Tony Ryall in 2013.

In 2017 the hospital opened Outpatients–Kāhui Manaaki, a $9.9 million outpatient building. It also houses a teaching space and a research centre.

== Services and Facilities ==
The hospital provides up to 663 surgical and general medical treatment beds. It has twelve operating theatres (one specialised in obstetric care), an emergency department, a 50-bed Assessment and Diagnostic Unit, an intensive care centre, an Elective Surgery Centre and a coronary care as well as a maternity and special care baby unit.

The hospital also provides endoscopy, radiology, pathology, anaesthetic, gynecological, general surgery, a cardiac catheter lab and mental health services through the onsite Marinoto and He Puna Waiora units. Two of the wards specialise in assessment, treatment and rehabilitation of older patients over 65 years of age.

== Funding and staffing ==
In 2007, North Shore Hospital repeatedly reported 100% occupancy rates and difficulties in finding enough staff. This is alleged to be partly due to North Shore City's affluence, with the catchment area having some of the highest average incomes in New Zealand, as well as scoring high on other social indicators.

The issues with staff shortages and overcrowding, repeatedly discussed in the press during the middle of 2007, have led two North Shore National MPs to inquire into the issue, noting that a 'crisis of confidence' had developed, which was generating more concern from locals 'than anything else in recent times'.

In 2011 North Shore Hospital opened an Assessment and Diagnostic Unit (ADU) designed to improve overcrowding and patient flow through the North Shore Emergency Department, and increase inpatient bed capacity. Waitemata DHB has since made improvements against the NZ Ministry of Health's Shorter Stays in ED target. From July to September 2009 61% of patients were admitted, discharged or transferred from an emergency department within six hours. For the same period in 2013, 95% of patients were admitted, discharged or transferred within six hours. In 2024, the hospital was struggling to handle demand with emergency department patients having to stay on trolleys in the corridors at times, this was attributed partly to the hospital not having enough inpatient beds available to receive patients from emergency. An increase incidents of aggression against staff was also attributed to pressure on resources.

== Teaching and research ==
North Shore Hospital is a teaching hospital. Together with Waitākere Hospital, it forms the Waitematā clinical campus of the University of Auckland Faculty of Medical and Health Sciences. Medical students are taught at the hospital, including in outpatient clinics. Since 2017, the University of Auckland, Unitec and Auckland University of Technology have also had permanent teaching space in the Outpatients–Kāhui Manaaki building.

The hospital carries out research with the University of Auckland and Auckland University of Technology. The Research Innovation and Knowledge Centre, which opened in 2017 in the Outpatients–Kāhui Manaaki building, aims to bring clinicians, researchers and students together to improve patient care. The building also provides space for the hospital's Haematology Research Group

== See also ==
- List of hospitals in New Zealand
- Healthcare in New Zealand
