= Caroline McElnay =

New Zealand former Director of Public Health

Caroline McElnay QSO
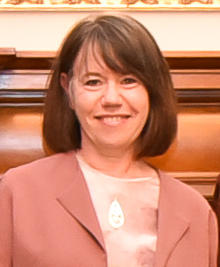
- McElnay in 2020

Chief Health Officer of Victoria
- Incumbent
- Assumed office c. August 2025
- Premier: Jacinta Allan
- Preceded by: Brett Sutton

Director of Public Health
- In office 2016–2022

Personal details
- Born: Bushmills, Northern Ireland
- Education: Queen's University Belfast; University of Manchester
- Occupation: Public health official

Caroline Ann McElnay QSO (/ˈmæk.ɪlˌneɪ/) is a medical officer in New Zealand. She was the director of public health for the New Zealand Ministry of Health from 2016 to 2022.

== Biography ==
McElnay, one of seven children, grew up on a farm in Bushmills, Northern Ireland. She studied medicine at Queen's University Belfast and then public health at the University of Manchester. During her studies in Manchester she completed a one-year exchange in New Zealand, including six months in Napier.

She was appointed director of population health for Hawke's Bay District Health Board. She advocated for health equity in the region and in 2014 she published a major report on the subject. While at the board she was involved in the response to Havelock North's gastro outbreak, the first case of the SARS virus in New Zealand and a listeria outbreak.

McElnay was appointed to the role of director of public health at the Ministry of Health in 2016. She came to international attention during the COVID-19 pandemic. Appearing in live-broadcast television press conferences, she was described as second-in-command to director-general Ashley Bloomfield and one of the most powerful women in the country. She chaired the Pandemic Influenza Technical Advisory Group, which advised the ministry on matters concerning the control of the COVID-19 pandemic in New Zealand.

McElnay's resignation as director of public health was announced to Ministry of Health staff in February 2022. Her last day in the role was 7 April. She was later appointed immunisation clinical lead at Health New Zealand and a member of the Ministry of Health's public health advisory committee. In May 2025 she was announced as chief health officer for the Victoria State Government and took up that role in August. She was reappointed to the New Zealand public health advisory committee and appointed as its chair in November 2025.

== Honours and awards ==
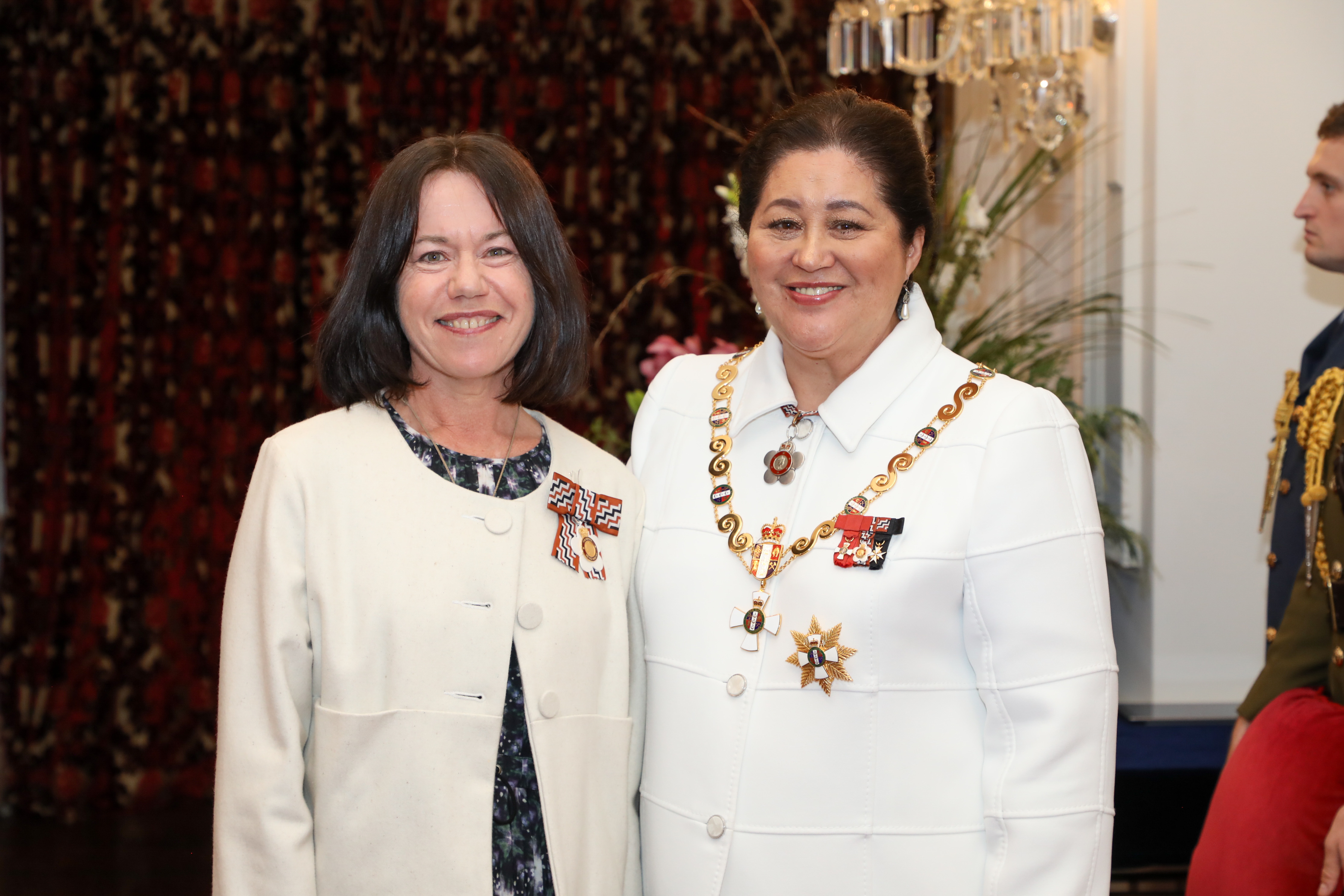
McElnay (left), after her investiture as a Companion of the Queen's Service Order by the governor-general, Dame Cindy Kiro, at Government House, Wellington, on 25 May 2023

In the 2023 New Year Honours, McElnay was appointed a Companion of the Queen's Service Order, for services to public health.

== Personal life ==
McElnay later moved with her husband to Napier in 1995. She has three children.

== Publications ==
- McElnay, C., & University of Manchester. (1991). The epidemiology of hip fractures in the elderly and the efficacy of vitamin D supplementation as a preventive strategy. Manchester: University of Manchester.
- McElnay, C., & Hawke's Bay District Health Board. (2014). Health inequity in Hawke's Bay.
