= List of chairpersons of district health boards =

This is a list of chairpersons of district health boards (DHBs) in New Zealand. District health boards were organisations established by the New Zealand Public Health and Disability Act 2000, responsible for ensuring the provision of health and disability services to populations within a defined geographical area. They existed from 1 January 2001, when the Act came into force, to 30 June 2022. Initially there were 21 DHBs and that reduced to 20 in 2010. Boards were partially appointed by the Minister of Health, and partially elected as part of the country's triennial local elections. The Minister of Health appointed the chairperson and deputy chair, and they were commonly chosen from the people appointed to the board but sometimes, these roles went to elected members. A total of 83 people served as DHB chairpersons; this number does not include commissioners or acting chairs.

== Composition of district health boards ==
DHBs were partially elected and partially appointed. There were up to eleven members on the board. Seven of these members were elected as part of the New Zealand local elections. Up to four members were appointed by the Minister of Health and these appointments generally included the chair and deputy chair. Still, sometimes these positions were given to elected members. Appointments happened after the local elections. They gave the minister an opportunity to fill skill gaps on the board, e.g. appoint individuals with expertise in finance or with experience in the governance of large organisations. People could apply to the ministry to be appointed.

== Inaugural chairpersons ==
With the exception of four of the twenty-one district health boards, the previous Hospital and Health Service (HHS) board chairs were appointed as the inaugural chair. The Health Minister for the first round of appointments was Annette King and by 21 December 2000, all chairperson appointments were confirmed:

DHB	Name	Notes
Auckland District Health Board	Richard Waddel	replaced in December 2001
Bay of Plenty District Health Board	Robin Wray	replaced in December 2001
Canterbury District Health Board	Syd Bradley	new chair
Capital and Coast District Health Board	Bob Henare	
Counties Manukau District Health Board	Ross Keenan	
Hawke's Bay District Health Board	Kevin Atkinson	new chair
Hutt Valley District Health Board	Warren Young	
Lakes District Health Board	Judith Stanway	replaced in December 2001
MidCentral District Health Board	Ian Wilson	concurrently chair of Waikato
Nelson Marlborough District Health Board	Nigel McFadden	
Northland District Health Board	Wayne Brown	concurrently chair of Tairāwhiti; retired in Nov 2001
Otago District Health Board	Ross Black	replaced in December 2001
South Canterbury District Health Board	Joe Butterfield	
Southland District Health Board	Rick Bettle	replaced in December 2001; became chair of West Coast
Tairāwhiti District Health Board	Wayne Brown	concurrently chair of Northland
Taranaki District Health Board	Hayden Wano	new chair
Waikato District Health Board	Ian Wilson	concurrently chair of MidCentral
Wairarapa District Health Board	Doug Matheson	
Waitematā District Health Board	Alison Paterson	replaced in December 2001
Whanganui District Health Board	Graeme Meyers	new chair; replaced in December 2001
West Coast District Health Board	Marian van der Goes	replaced in December 2001

== December 2001 appointments ==
Following the October 2001 local elections where seven board members were elected for each board, Health Minister King announced chairperson appointments on 12 November 2001. Twelve of the twenty-one chairs continued in their role. Two prior chairpersons were assigned to different boards. Of the remaining seven new chairs, five had prior tenure on a district health board, and two were new to DHBs. For three of the incumbents, it was signalled that they would be replaced within the coming term.

DHB	Name	Notes
Auckland District Health Board	Wayne Brown	new chair; concurrently chair of Tairāwhiti; previously chaired Northland
Bay of Plenty District Health Board	Mary Hackett	new chair
Canterbury District Health Board	Syd Bradley	continues in role
Capital and Coast District Health Board	Bob Henare	continues in role
Counties Manukau District Health Board	Ross Keenan	continues in role
Hawke's Bay District Health Board	Kevin Atkinson	continues in role
Hutt Valley District Health Board	Warren Young	continues in role
Lakes District Health Board	Stewart Edward	new chair
MidCentral District Health Board	Ian Wilson	continues in role; concurrently chair of Waikato
Nelson Marlborough District Health Board	Nigel McFadden	continues in role
Northland District Health Board	Lynette Stewart	new chair
Otago District Health Board	Richard Thomson	new chair
South Canterbury District Health Board	Joe Butterfield	continues in role
Southland District Health Board	Dennis Cairns	previously the deputy chair
Tairāwhiti District Health Board	Wayne Brown	continues in role for a further year to assist in transition; concurrently chair of Auckland
Taranaki District Health Board	Hayden Wano	continues in role
Waikato District Health Board	Ian Wilson	appointed for a further year to assist in transition
Wairarapa District Health Board	Doug Matheson	appointed for a further year to assist in transition but served until September 2006
Waitemata District Health Board	Kay McKelvie	new chair
West Coast District Health Board	Rick Bettle	new chair; previously chaired Southland
Whanganui District Health Board	Gavin Doyle	new chair

=== Changes during 2001–2004 term ===
During the local government term, several changes occurred. Michael Ludbrook replaced Ian Wilson as chair of the Waikato DHB in June 2002. Wayne Brown was forced to resign as chair of the Tairāwhiti DHB. He had been appointed as chair for both Auckland and Tairāwhiti, but had also been elected onto the Tairāwhiti board. As an elected member, he was not permitted to also hold a position on another district health board. Rick Bettle left the West Coast DHB at the end of 2002 and after Dr Christine Robertson was acting chairperson for two months, King appointed Professor Gregor Coster as the new chair on 11 February 2003. Peter Glensor replaced Warren Young at the Hutt Valley DHB in June 2003. Gavin Doyle resigned from Whanganui DHB and was replaced by acting chair Patrick O'Connor.

DHB	Incumbent	Date	Replacement	Notes
Waikato DHB	Ian Wilson	June 2002	Michael Ludbrook	Wilson's retirement had been foreshadowed
Tairāwhiti DHB	Wayne Brown	August 2002	Ingrid Collins	forced resignation due to an administrative error by the Ministry of Health; new chair from March 2003
West Coast DHB	Rick Bettle	2002	Gregor Coster	new chair from February 2003
Hutt Valley DHB	Warren Young	June 2003	Peter Glensor	new chair from February 2003
Whanganui DHB	Gavin Doyle	?	Patrick O'Connor	acting chair since Doyle's resignation

== December 2004 appointments ==
Following the October 2004 local elections King changed only two of the incumbent chairpersons: new chairs were appointed for Nelson Marlborough DHB and for Counties Manukau DHB. Ross Keenan, who stepped down from being chair for Counties Manukau DHB, was appointed deputy chair for the three DHBs covering the Auckland region (Counties Manukau, Auckland and Waitemata) to achieve better collaboration.

DHB	Name	Notes
Auckland District Health Board	Wayne Brown	
Bay of Plenty District Health Board	Mary Hackett	
Canterbury District Health Board	Syd Bradley	confirmed for one further year
Capital and Coast District Health Board	Bob Henare	
Counties Manukau District Health Board	Patrick Snedden	new chair
Hawke's Bay District Health Board	Kevin Atkinson	
Hutt Valley District Health Board	Peter Glensor	chair since 2003
Lakes District Health Board	Stewart Edward	
MidCentral District Health Board	Ian Wilson	
Nelson Marlborough District Health Board	Alex Grooby	was previously the deputy chair
Northland District Health Board	Lynette Stewart	
Otago District Health Board	Richard Thomson	
South Canterbury District Health Board	Joe Butterfield	
Southland District Health Board	Dennis Cairns	
Tairāwhiti District Health Board	Ingrid Collins	chair since 2002
Taranaki District Health Board	Hayden Wano	
Waikato District Health Board	Michael Ludbrook	chair since June 2002
Wairarapa District Health Board	Doug Matheson	
Waitemata District Health Board	Kay McKelvie	
West Coast District Health Board	Gregor Coster	chair since 2003
Whanganui District Health Board	Patrick O'Connor	O'Connor had been acting chair since Doyle's resignation; now confirmed as permanent chair

=== Changes during 2004–2007 term ===
During the local government term, several changes occurred. Alex Grooby, the chair of the Nelson Marlborough DHB, died in July 2005. Pete Hodgson took over as Health Minister from Annette King in October 2005. Hodgson appointed Suzanne Win as successor to Grooby in Nelson Marlborough, effective 1 January 2006. Hodgson appointed Bob Francis to take over as chairperson for Wairarapa DHB from Doug Matheson on 28 November 2006. Dr Judith Aitken replaced Bob Henare for Capital and Coast DHB on 24 December 2006. Dr Patrick O'Connor resigned as chairperson of Whanganui DHB on 1 May 2007 and was replaced by Kate Joblin on 3 May 2007.

DHB	Incumbent	Date	Replacement	Notes
Nelson Marlborough DHB	Alex Grooby	1 January 2006	Suzanne Win	Grooby had died in July 2005
Wairarapa DHB	Doug Matheson	28 November 2006	Bob Francis	
Capital and Coast DHB	Bob Henare	24 December 2006	Judith Aitken	Henare had been on sick leave since an operation
Whanganui DHB	Patrick O'Connor	3 May 2007	Kate Joblin	

== December 2007 appointments ==
The 2007 local elections were held on 13 October. On 31 October 2007, David Cunliffe succeeded Hodgson as Minister of Health. Cunliffe released the list of board chairperson on 14 November 2007, where thirteen got reappointed, two moved to different boards, and four new chairpersons were appointed. Two decisions were left for later. On 14 December, Cunliffe announced businessman John Anderson as the new chairperson for the Capital and Coast DHB, who was to work alongside a Crown Monitor (i.e. a person who observes a board's decision-making, ensures government policy is reflected in board decisions, and who reports directly to the minister). The remaining decision was delayed until 27 February 2008 when Cunliffe sacked the entire board of the Hawke's Bay DHB, alleging that the board had become dysfunctional. Cunliffe appointed Capital and Coast DHB chair John Anderson as a commissioner for the Hawke's Bay DHB.

DHB	Name	Notes
Auckland District Health Board	Patrick Snedden	moved to Auckland from Counties Manukau after Brown retired
Bay of Plenty District Health Board	Mary Hackett	reappointed
Canterbury District Health Board	Alister James	new appointment as chair after he failed to get re-elected to the board
Capital and Coast District Health Board	John Anderson	appointed 14 December 2007; Crown Monitor also appointed that day
Counties Manukau District Health Board	Gregor Coster	moved to Counties Manukau from West Coast
Hawke's Bay District Health Board	John Anderson	appointed 28 February 2008 as Commissioner; board dismissed
Hutt Valley District Health Board	Peter Glensor	reappointed
Lakes District Health Board	Stewart Edward	reappointed
MidCentral District Health Board	Ian Wilson	reappointed
Nelson Marlborough District Health Board	Suzanne Win	reappointed
Northland District Health Board	Lynette Stewart	reappointed
Otago District Health Board	Richard Thomson	reappointed
South Canterbury District Health Board	Joe Butterfield	reappointed
Southland District Health Board	Dennis Cairns	reappointed
Tairāwhiti District Health Board	Ingrid Collins	reappointed
Taranaki District Health Board	John Young	new chair
Waikato District Health Board	Jerry Rickman	new chair
Wairarapa District Health Board	Bob Francis	reappointed (chair since November 2006)
Waitemata District Health Board	Kay McKelvie	reappointed
West Coast District Health Board	Rex Williams	new chair
Whanganui District Health Board	Kate Joblin	reappointed (chair since May 2007)

=== Changes during 2007–2010 term ===
During the local government term, several changes occurred. Cunliffe appointed two Crown Monitors to the Whanganui DHB, but left the chairperson in place.

With the 8 November 2008 general election, the Fifth National Government came into power and the role of Health Minister was assigned to Tony Ryall. On 5 December 2008, Southland DHB chair Dennis Cairns foreshadowed his resignation; he chaired his last board meeting on 30 January 2009. In December 2008, Ryall foreshadowed that the board of Hawke's Bay DHB elected in 2007 would be reinstated from February 2009, with the current commissioner John Anderson taking the chairmanship. In February 2009, Kay McKelvie's (Note: McKelvie resigned over budget cuts imposed by the government) and Jerry Rickman's (Note: Rickman resigned to avoid the perception of a conflict of interest) resignations as chairpersons of the Waitemata and Waikato DHBs were announced, respectively. Also in February, Ryall sacked the Otago DHB chairperson, Richard Thomson, over a $17 million fraud by staff members and replaced him with immediate effect with Errol Millar. In March 2009, Ryall appointed Paul Menzies as the new chairperson of Southland DHB. In May 2009, Ryall announced Graeme Milne as the new chairperson for Waikato DHB. Dr Lester Levy's appointment as the new chair for the Waitemata DHB was announced in June 2009.

There is a statutory limit of nine years for DHB chairpersons, as defined in the New Zealand Public Health and Disability Act 2000, and several chairs reached this limit at the end of 2009. This affected Northland chair Lynette Stewart, who was replaced by Tony Norman. For the South Canterbury DHB, Joe Butterfield was replaced by Murray Cleverley.

In February 2010, Ryall announced that the Otago and Southland District Health Boards would merge to form the Southern District Health Board, with a combined board of the elected members providing provisional oversight until the local elections in October 2010. The merger came into effect on 1 May 2010, with Errol Millar (ex Otago DHB) as chair and Paul Menzies (ex Southland DHB) as deputy chair. Taranaki DHB chair John Young died on 14 September 2010, a month prior to the next local body election.

DHB	Incumbent	Date	Replacement	Notes
Hawke's Bay DHB	John Anderson	February 2009	John Anderson	Anderson's role changed from Commissioner to chairperson
Otago DHB	Richard Thomson	17 February 2009	Errol Millar	Thomson got sacked with immediate effect and replaced by Millar
Southland DHB	Dennis Cairns	March 2009	Paul Menzies	Cairns foreshadowed resignation in December 2008; replaced with Menzies in March 2009
Waikato DHB	Jerry Rickman	May 2009	Graeme Milne	Rickman resigned in February 2009; replaced with Milne in May 2009
Waitemata DHB	Kay McKelvie	June 2009	Lester Levy	McKelvie resigned in February 2009; replaced with Levy in June 2009
Northland DHB	Lynette Stewart	January 2010	Tony Norman	Stewart reached the statutory limit; replaced with Norman in January 2010
MidCentral DHB	Ian Wilson	January 2010	Phil Sunderland	Wilson reached the statutory limit; replaced with Sunderland in January 2010
South Canterbury DHB	Joe Butterfield	January 2010	Murray Cleverley	Butterfield reached the statutory limit; replaced with Cleverley in January 2010
Southern DHB	new DHB	1 May 2010	Errol Millar	Otago and Southland merger to form Southern DHB, with the Otago chair retained
Taranaki DHB	John Young	14 September 2010	vacant	Young died just prior to the next local election

== December 2010 appointments ==
The 2010 local elections were held on 9 October. On 22 November 2010, Health Minister Ryall released the list of board chairpersons. Ten new chairpersons were announced and three people (Joe Butterfield, Virginia Hope, and Lester Levy) chaired two boards. It was the first time that a board was elected for the Southern DHB, which had been formed earlier in the year.

DHB	Name	Notes
Auckland District Health Board	Lester Levy	
Bay of Plenty District Health Board	Sally Webb	
Canterbury District Health Board	Bruce Matheson	
Capital and Coast District Health Board	Virginia Hope	
Counties Manukau District Health Board	Gregor Coster	reappointed
Hawke's Bay District Health Board	Kevin Atkinson	
Hutt Valley District Health Board	Virginia Hope	
Lakes District Health Board	Deryck Shaw	
MidCentral District Health Board	Phil Sunderland	reappointed
Nelson Marlborough District Health Board	Jenny Black	
Northland District Health Board	Tony Norman	reappointed
South Canterbury District Health Board	Murray Cleverley	reappointed
Southern District Health Board	Joe Butterfield	
Tairāwhiti District Health Board	David Scott	
Taranaki District Health Board	Mary Bourke	
Waikato District Health Board	Graeme Milne	reappointed
Wairarapa District Health Board	Bob Francis	reappointed
Waitemata District Health Board	Lester Levy	reappointed
West Coast District Health Board	Paul McCormack	
Whanganui District Health Board	Kate Joblin	reappointed

There were no changes during the term.

== December 2013 appointments ==
The 2013 local elections were held on 12 October. On 29 November 2013, Health Minister Ryall released the list of board chairpersons. Fourteen chairpersons continued in their role and six new appointments were made. Three people (Murray Cleverley, Virginia Hope, and Lester Levy) chaired two boards.

DHB	Name	Notes
Auckland District Health Board	Lester Levy	reappointed (also chair of Waitemata DHB)
Bay of Plenty District Health Board	Sally Webb	reappointed
Canterbury District Health Board	Murray Cleverley	new appointment (also chair of South Canterbury DHB)
Capital and Coast District Health Board	Virginia Hope	reappointed (also chair of Hutt Valley DHB)
Counties Manukau District Health Board	Lee Mathias	new appointment
Hawke's Bay District Health Board	Kevin Atkinson	reappointed
Hutt Valley District Health Board	Virginia Hope	reappointed (also chair of Capital and Coast DHB)
Lakes District Health Board	Deryck Shaw	reappointed
MidCentral District Health Board	Phil Sunderland	reappointed
Nelson Marlborough District Health Board	Jenny Black	reappointed
Northland District Health Board	Tony Norman	reappointed
South Canterbury District Health Board	Murray Cleverley	reappointed (now also chair of Canterbury DHB)
Southern District Health Board	Joe Butterfield	reappointed
Tairāwhiti District Health Board	David Scott	reappointed
Taranaki District Health Board	Pauline Lockett	new appointment
Waikato District Health Board	Bob Simcock	new appointment
Wairarapa District Health Board	Derek Milne	new appointment
Waitemata District Health Board	Lester Levy	reappointed (also chair of Auckland DHB)
West Coast District Health Board	Paul McCormack	reappointed
Whanganui District Health Board	Dot McKinnon	new appointment

=== Changes during 2013–2016 term ===
In October 2014, the role of Health Minister went from Ryall to Jonathan Coleman. In March 2015, it became known that Coleman intended to replace Southern DHB chair, Joe Butterfield, with a new chair. In May 2015, the government passed the New Zealand Public Health and Disability (Southern DHB) Elections Bill. This allowed it to keep the commissioners for the Southern DHB in place, with no district health board elections held in that area in 2016. In June 2015, Coleman sacked the entire board and replaced them with commissioners.

DHB	Incumbent	Date	Replacement	Notes
Southern DHB	Joe Butterfield	June 2015	vacant	board sacked and commissioners installed

== December 2016 appointments ==
The 2016 local elections were held on 8 October. On 1 December 2016, Health Minister Coleman released the list of 19 board chairpersons, with Southern DHB still run by a commissioner. Twelve chairpersons continued in their role and seven new appointments were made. Three people (Andrew Blair, Murray Cleverley, and Jenny Margery Black) chaired two boards. Dr Lester Levy was from now in charge of the three DHBs in the Auckland area.

DHB	Name	Notes
Auckland District Health Board	Lester Levy	reappointed (also chairs Counties Manukau and Waitemata DHBs)
Bay of Plenty District Health Board	Sally Webb	reappointed
Canterbury District Health Board	Murray Cleverley	reappointed (also chairs South Canterbury DHB)
Capital and Coast District Health Board	Andrew Blair	new appointment (also chairs Hutt Valley DHB)
Counties Manukau District Health Board	Lester Levy	new appointment (also chairs Auckland and Waitemata DHBs)
Hawke's Bay District Health Board	Kevin Atkinson	reappointed
Hutt Valley District Health Board	Andrew Blair	new appointment (also chairs Capital and Coast DHB)
Lakes District Health Board	Deryck Shaw	reappointed
MidCentral District Health Board	Dot McKinnon	new appointment (also chairs Whanganui DHB)
Nelson Marlborough District Health Board	Jenny Margery Black	reappointed (also chairs West Coast DHB)
Northland District Health Board	Sally Macauley	new appointment
South Canterbury District Health Board	Murray Cleverley	reappointed (also chairs Canterbury DHB)
Tairāwhiti District Health Board	David Scott	reappointed
Taranaki District Health Board	Pauline Lockett	reappointed
Waikato District Health Board	Bob Simcock	reappointed
Wairarapa District Health Board	Paul Collins	new appointment
Waitemata District Health Board	Lester Levy	reappointed (also chairs Auckland and Counties Manukau DHBs)
West Coast District Health Board	Jenny Margery Black	new appointment (also chairs Nelson Marlborough DHB)
Whanganui District Health Board	Dot McKinnon	reappointed (also chairs MidCentral DHB)

=== Changes during 2016–2019 term ===
After Murray Cleverley's February 2017 resignation from the two boards that he chaired, Coleman appointed his successors in August 2017. John Wood was appointed to the Canterbury DHB, and Ron Luxton took over the chairmanship of the South Canterbury DHB.

After the 2017 general election, the Sixth Labour Government of New Zealand formed and David Clark succeeded Coleman as Minister of Health. Lester Levy resigned in December 2017 as chair of all three Auckland region DHBs as he was nearing the statutory limit of service on the Waitematā DHB, where he had been appointed in June 2009. Clark appointed three new chairpersons: Mark Gosche for Counties-Manukau DHB (from 3 May), Patrick Snedden for Auckland DHB (from 1 June), and Judy McGregor for Waitemata DHB (from 10 June). In August 2018, Clark appointed Sally Webb, already the chair of Bay of Plenty DHB, as chairperson for Waikato DHB. At the same time, a Crown Monitor was appointed at Waikato. On 7 May 2019, Clark sacked the board of Waikato DHB and installed Dr Karen Poutasi as a commissioner. Clark also announced that there would be no elections for a new board at the 2019 local elections.

DHB	Incumbent	Date	Replacement	Notes
Canterbury DHB	Murray Cleverley	August 2017	John Wood	Cleverley had resigned in February 2017
South Canterbury DHB	Murray Cleverley	August 2017	Ron Luxton	Cleverley had resigned in February 2017
Counties Manukau DHB	Lester Levy	3 May 2018	Mark Gosche	Levy had resigned in December 2017
Auckland DHB	Lester Levy	1 June 2018	Patrick Snedden	Levy had resigned in December 2017
Waitemata DHB	Lester Levy	10 June 2018	Judy McGregor	Levy had resigned in December 2017
Waikato DHB	Bob Simcock	August 2018	Sally Webb	a Crown Monitor was also appointed
Waikato DHB	Sally Webb	7 May 2019	vacant	board sacked and Dr Karen Poutasi installed as commissioner

== December 2019 appointments ==
The 2019 local elections were held on 12 October. On 7 December 2019, Health Minister Clark released the list of 19 board chairpersons, with the Waikato DHB under continued control by a commissioner.

DHB	Name	Notes
Auckland District Health Board	Patrick Snedden	reappointed; first appointed 1 June 2018
Bay of Plenty District Health Board	Michael Cullen	new appointment
Canterbury District Health Board	John Hansen	new appointment
Capital and Coast District Health Board	David Smol	new appointment
Counties Manukau District Health Board	Mark Gosche	reappointed; first appointed 3 May 2018
Hawke's Bay District Health Board	Shayne Walker	new appointment
Hutt Valley District Health Board	David Smol	new appointment
Lakes District Health Board	Jim Mather	new appointment
MidCentral District Health Board	Brendan Duffy	new appointment
Nelson Marlborough District Health Board	Jenny Black	reappointed
Northland District Health Board	Harry Burkhardt	new appointment
Southern District Health Board	Dave Cull	new appointment
South Canterbury District Health Board	Ron Luxton	reappointed; first appointed August 2017
Tairāwhiti District Health Board	Kim Ngārimu	new appointment
Taranaki District Health Board	Cassandra Crowley	new appointment
Wairarapa District Health Board	Paul Collins	reappointed; first appointed December 2016
Waitemata District Health Board	Judy McGregor	reappointed; first appointed 10 June 2018
West Coast District Health Board	Rick Barker	new appointment
Whanganui District Health Board	Ken Whelan	new appointment

=== Changes during 2019–2022 term ===
Effective 8 March 2020, Sir Michael Cullen resigned from his chairmanship of the Bay of Plenty DHB after he had been diagnosed with small-cell carcinoma. The deputy chair, Sharon Shea, was appointed acting interim chair. Board member Ron Scott was appointed acting deputy chair. On 13 April 2021, Shea was appointed as permanent chair, with Geoff Esterman appointed as the permanent deputy chair. Shea was appointed co-chair of the Māori Health Authority Te Aka Whai Ora in September 2021. She resigned from the Bay of Plenty DHB effective 16 December 2021 and was, on the same day, replaced by Bev Edlin.

DHB	Incumbent	Date	Replacement	Notes
Bay of Plenty DHB	Michael Cullen	8 March 2020	Sharon Shea	Cullen resigned
Bay of Plenty DHB	Sharon Shea	16 December 2021	Bev Edlin	Shea resigned

== List of chairpersons ==
The following list shows all chairpersons who served on any of the 22 boards that existed between 2001 and 2022.

Name	Auckland	Bay of Plenty	Canterbury	Capital and Coast	Counties Manukau	Hawke's Bay	Hutt Valley	Lakes	MidCentral	Nelson Marlborough	Northland	Otago	South Canterbury	Southern	Southland	Tairāwhiti	Taranaki	Waikato	Wairarapa	Waitemata	West Coast	Whanganui
Judith Aitken				x																		
John Anderson				x		x																
Kevin Atkinson						x																
Rick Barker																					x	
Rick Bettle															x						x	
Ross Black												x										
Jenny Black										x											x	
Andrew Blair				x			x															
Mary Bourke																	x					
Syd Bradley			x																			
Wayne Brown	x										x					x						
Harry Burkhardt											x											
Joe Butterfield													x	x								
Dennis Cairns															x							
Murray Cleverley			x										x									
Ingrid Collins																x						
Paul Collins																			x			
Gregor Coster					x																x	
Cassandra Crowley																	x					
Dave Cull														x								
Michael Cullen		x																				
Gavin Doyle																						x
Brendan Duffy									x													
Bev Edlin		x																				
Stewart Edward								x														
Bob Francis																			x			
Peter Glensor							x															
Mark Gosche					x																	
Alex Grooby										x												
Mary Hackett		x																				
John Hansen			x																			
Bob Henare				x																		
Virginia Hope				x			x															
Alister James			x																			
Kate Joblin																						x
Ross Keenan					x																	
Lester Levy	x				x															x		
Pauline Lockett																	x					
Michael Ludbrook																		x				
Ron Luxton													x									
Sally Macauley											x											
Jim Mather								x														
Doug Matheson																			x			
Bruce Matheson			x																			
Lee Mathias					x																	
Paul McCormack																					x	
Nigel McFadden										x												
Judy McGregor																				x		
Kay McKelvie																				x		
Dot McKinnon																						x
Paul Menzies															x							
Graeme Meyers																						x
Errol Millar												x		x								
Graeme Milne																		x				
Derek Milne																			x			
Kim Ngārimu																x						
Tony Norman											x											
Patrick O'Connor																						x
Alison Paterson																				x		
Jerry Rickman																		x				
David Scott																x						
Deryck Shaw								x														
Sharon Shea		x																				
Bob Simcock																		x				
David Smol				x			x															
Patrick Snedden	x				x																	
Judith Stanway								x														
Lynette Stewart											x											
Phil Sunderland									x													
Richard Thomson												x										
Marian van der Goes																					x	
Richard Waddel	x																					
Shayne Walker						x																
Hayden Wano																	x					
Sally Webb		x																				
Ken Whelan																						x
Rex Williams																					x	
Ian Wilson									x									x				
Suzanne Win										x												
John Wood			x																			
Robin Wray		x																				
Warren Young							x															
John Young																	x					
