= Kate Joblin =

New Zealand local politician and accountant

Kate Joblin MNZM
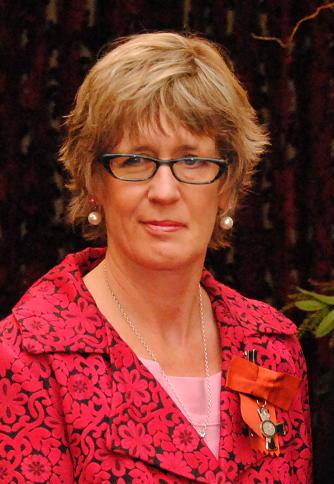
- Joblin in 2013

Whanganui District Councillor
- Incumbent
- Assumed office 8 October 2016

Chair of the Whanganui District Health Board
- In office 3 May 2007 – 9 December 2013
- Preceded by: Patrick O'Connor
- Succeeded by: Dot McKinnon

Personal details
- Born: 1961 or 1962
- Spouse: Ross Mills
- Children: 6

Kathleen Frances Joblin MNZM (born 1961 or 1962) is a New Zealand local politician and chartered accountant. She has been a member of the Whanganui District Council since 2016, and was chair of the Whanganui District Health Board from 2007 to 2013.

== Career ==
In the 2016 local elections, Joblin won a seat in the Whanganui District Council. She was re-elected in 2019, saying that she wanted to continue previous work that the council had started. As of 2019 she is the Finance and Strategy Committee chairperson and she co-chairs the Positive Ageing Forum of the council, which provides support to the elderly. She was re-elected again 2022 for her third term, saying that her priorities were in housing and public transport. The committees that she is on include the Strategy and Policy, Risk & Assurance, Chief Executive's Performance Review, and Emergency committees. In 2022, she was paid $56,724 per year as councillor.

Joblin previously served on the Whanganui District Health Board for 11 years, and was chair between May 2007 and December 2013.

Joblin runs accounting company Kate Joblin & Co Ltd. She is also a trustee of the Life to the Max Trust, and chairs the Safer Whanganui advisory group. Joblin is married to Ross Mills, and has six children. In 2010, Joblin and Mills bought a one-hectare (2.5-acre) property at Westmere, where they established a lavender farm.

In the 2013 New Year Honours, Joblin was appointed a Member of the New Zealand Order of Merit, services to health.

== See also ==
- List of chairpersons of district health boards
