= Judith Aitken =

New Zealand public servant and local politician

Judith Aitken CNZM QSO
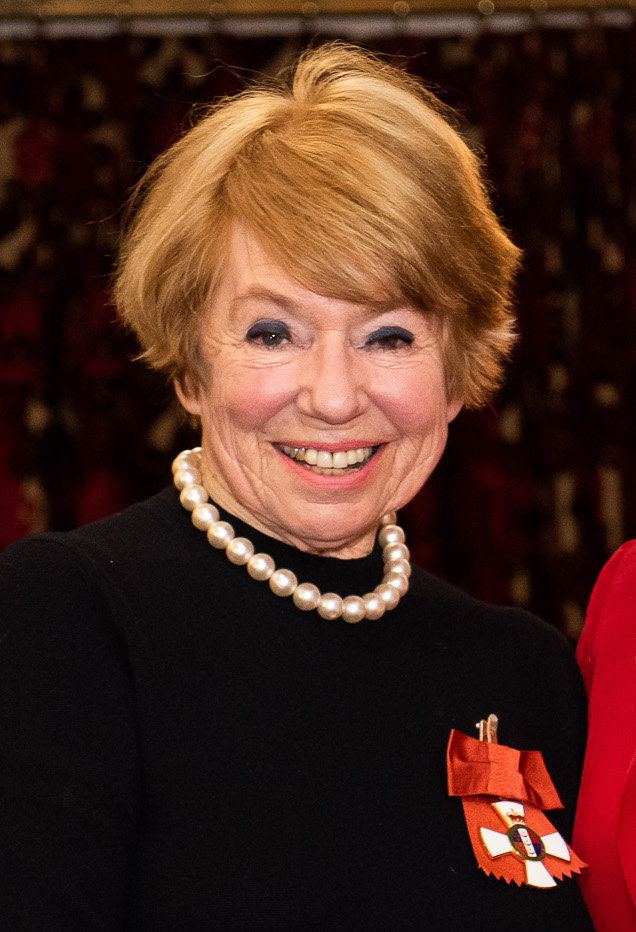
- Aitken in 2019

Greater Wellington Regional Councillor
- In office 2001–2016

Chair of the Capital and Coast District Health Board
- In office 24 December 2006 – 9 December 2007
- Preceded by: Bob Henare
- Succeeded by: John Anderson

2nd Secretary of the Ministry of Women's Affairs
- In office 1988–1992
- Preceded by: Mary O'Regan

Personal details
- Born: Judith Estranna Wilson; 20 December 1937 (age 88) Te Awamutu, New Zealand
- Children: 4

Academic background
- Education: Victoria University of Wellington
- Thesis: Public expenditure planning in New Zealand (1983)
- Doctoral advisor: Ralph Brookes; Les Cleveland

Judith Estranna Aitken CNZM QSO (née Wilson; born 1937) is a former New Zealand public servant and local-body politician. She has been chief executive of the Ministry of Women's Affairs, chair of the Capital and Coast District Health Board, and a member of the Greater Wellington Regional Council.

== Early life, education and family ==
Aitken was born Judith Estranna Wilson in Te Awamutu, on 20 December 1937, the only child of Gwendolen Wilhelmina Wilson (née Irwin) and John Andrew Wilson. She was educated at St Cuthbert's College in Auckland, and went on to study at Auckland University College from 1956 to 1958, although she did not graduate with a Bachelor of Arts degree from Auckland until 1971, after extramural study at Massey University in 1970. In 1959, she studied at Auckland Secondary Teachers' College, and was employed as a secondary school teacher periodically between 1960 and 1967. An Associate of Trinity College London in speech and drama, she was a speech and drama teacher from 1964 to 1966.

In 1960, she married Adrian John Mack, a schoolteacher, and they had two children before divorcing in 1967. She married again that year, to Russell George Aitken, another teacher, and they had two further children, before separating in 1979.

Aitken became politically active in the 1970s. While completing her bachelor's degree, she encountered the Society for Research on Women and became involved with the Labour Party, working as electorate secretary for a Labour candidate at the 1972 general election. In 1974, she became involved with planning for the International Women's Year (1975) in New Zealand.

Aitken returned to study in 1975, earning a Master of Public Policy degree from Victoria University of Wellington in 1978, and completing a PhD at the same institution in 1983. Her doctoral thesis, titled Public expenditure planning in New Zealand, was supervised by Ralph Brookes and, after Brookes' death, Les Cleveland. During this time, she also worked as a research assistant in the Department of Statistics (1975–1976), and as a lecturer in political science and public administration at Victoria between 1977 and 1981.

== Public-sector career ==
After leaving Victoria, Aitken received a six-month contract with the State Services Commission and the Planning Council to work on public enterprise. This became a full-time position, and she remained at the State Services Commission until 1986, when she moved to Electricity Division of the Ministry of Energy as director of corporate planning. Following the establishment of Electricorp as a state-owned enterprise in 1987, she became that organisation's corporate relations manager.

In 1988, Aitken was appointed the secretary of the Ministry of Women's Affairs—succeeding the inaugural secretary, Mary O'Regan—and the ministry's first chief executive officer. By this time, Aitken had a reputation for being right wing, in comparison with O'Regan who was described as a "so called liberal left secretary, committed to consensus and anti-racism", and Aitken agreed in an interview that she was "a member of the new right". In 1991, Aitken was a ministerial appointee to the Equal Employment Opportunities Trust, and was also part of the review of state-sector reforms. The following year, she served on the electoral referendum panel.

In 1992, Aitken moved to the Education Review Office (ERO) as chief executive and chief review officer, and remained there until the end of 2000. When Aitken left the ERO, the Minister of Education, Trevor Mallard, paid tribute to her, saying that she had "made a real difference to kids in New Zealand. She has caused a lot of people to focus on some important issues, [particularly] the importance of the quality of teachers."

== Local-body politics ==
From 2001 until 2016, Aitken was an elected member of the Greater Wellington Regional Council. Over the same 15-year period, she was also an elected member of the Capital and Coast District Health Board, becoming deputy chair in 2004 and chair in 2006. Her one-year appointment as chair of the district health board was not renewed by the Minister of Health, David Cunliffe, at the end of 2007, following an audit that was critical of the board. However, Aitken remained an elected board member and she went on to oversee governance of the board's 2016 Pacific action plan, which sought to improve the health of Pacific peoples.

== Other activities ==
From 1978 to 1982, Aitken was a member of the Wellington Girls' College board of governors, and she was a Victoria University of Wellington council member from 1988 to 1991. She was secretary of the New Zealand Council for Civil Liberties from 1982 to 1985, and a trustee of the New Zealand Natural Heritage Foundation from 1989 to 1991, the last year serving as the foundation's chair. Other boards on which Aitken has served include the Carter National Observatory, the Karori Wildlife Sanctuary, and the Holocaust Centre of New Zealand.

== Honours and awards ==
In 1990, Aitken received the New Zealand 1990 Commemoration Medal, and in 1993 she was awarded the New Zealand Suffrage Centennial Medal 1993. In the 1997 New Year Honours, Aitken was appointed a Companion of the Queen's Service Order, for public services. In the 2019 Queen's Birthday Honours, she was made a Companion of the New Zealand Order of Merit, for services to local government, the community, and education.

== Later life ==
In retirement, Aitken lives in Paekākāriki. It was reported in 2019 that she was collating the history of women in four areas: one was the history of women in government typing pools since 1945; and another covered six disabled women working in their respective fields.
