= Wayne Brown (New Zealand politician) =

Mayor of Auckland (born 1946)

His Worship Wayne Brown
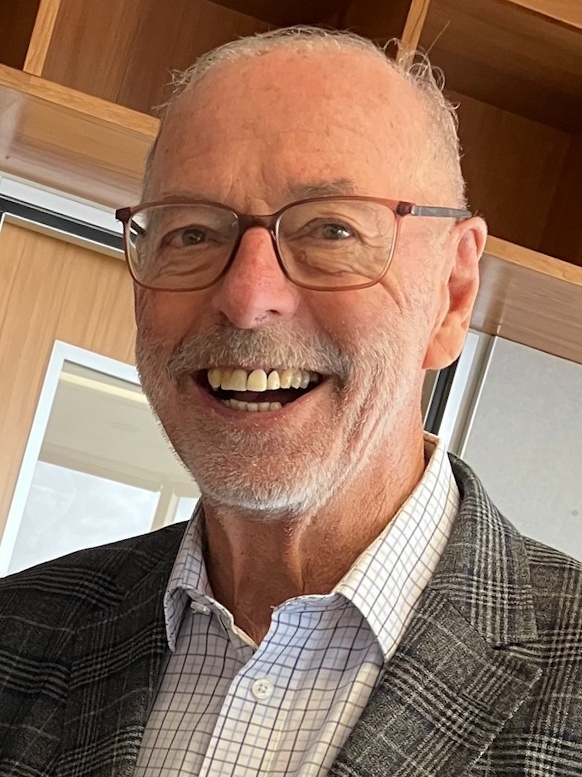
- Brown in 2026

3rd Mayor of Auckland
- Incumbent
- Assumed office 16 October 2022
- Deputy: Desley Simpson
- Preceded by: Phil Goff

4th Mayor of Far North
- In office October 2007 – October 2013
- Deputy: Sally Macauley (2007–2010); Ann Court (2010–2013)
- Preceded by: Yvonne Sharp
- Succeeded by: John Carter

Personal details
- Born: Wayne Kelvin Forrest Brown; 22 August 1946 (age 80) Auckland, New Zealand
- Party: Independent; New Zealand Party (1984)
- Spouse: Toni Brown (m. 1974)
- Children: 2
- Education: Auckland Grammar School
- Alma mater: University of Auckland
- Profession: Engineer; businessman

Wayne Kelvin Forrest Brown (born 22 August 1946) is a New Zealand businessman and politician who has been mayor of Auckland since 2022 and was previously mayor of the Far North from 2007 to 2013.

Born in Auckland in 1946, Brown studied engineering at the University of Auckland before becoming a property developer in the Bay of Islands. He went on to serve as a director of TVNZ, Māori TV, Transpower, Vector Ltd, and was once chair of the Land Transport Safety Authority.

He entered politics in 2007, winning the Far North mayoralty in a landslide; he was re-elected in 2010. After criticism for the collusion of his personal and business interests, a third term was denied to him in 2013.

He became the third mayor of Auckland in 2022, defeating councillor Efeso Collins. He sailed to victory in 2025, achieving 51% of the popular vote against second place Kerrin Leoni on 22%. For the 2025 election, he created the local ticket Fix Auckland; the group put forward 5 candidates for council and successfully elected 2 of them.

== Early life and family ==
Brown was born in Auckland on 22 August 1946, and was educated at Auckland Grammar School. He went on to study engineering at the University of Auckland from 1964 to 1967, and graduated with a Bachelor of Engineering degree. He then spent several years overseas.

After returning to New Zealand, Brown established an engineering consulting practice in Auckland. In 1974, he married his wife, Toni, and the couple went on to have two children. Two years after marrying, they moved to Kerikeri in the Bay of Islands.

In 1984 he was a parliamentary candidate for the Bay of Islands electorate for the free-market oriented New Zealand Party. He placed 4th with 1703 votes and 19.57% of the vote losing out to incumbent MP Neill Austin.

== Business career ==
An engineer by training, Brown is a property developer. He has served as a director of many New Zealand organisations, both public and private, including TVNZ, Māori TV, Transpower, Vector Ltd, and was chair of the Land Transport Safety Authority. In the 2000s he chaired the Government-owned telecommunications firm Kordia.

In 2019, he led a review for the New Zealand Government that recommended shifting the Port of Auckland to Marsden Point in the country's north. There was some controversy around this idea, with other reports suggesting it would be more expensive or that the port should be shifted to Manukau harbour. In 2020 the government deferred its decision until 2021.

As of 2022, his business interests include a public bar in Ōtāhuhu (the Milestone Bar), where he is a member of the Business Association, and at least one company directorship and shareholding.

== District health boards ==
Brown was appointed chairman of the Northland District Health Board and Tairāwhiti District Health Board in January 2001 when district health boards were established; he had previously chaired the respective Hospital and Health Service (HHS) boards. In December 2001, Brown was appointed to chairman of the Auckland District Health Board and remained chair of Tairāwhiti DHB. During the 2001–2004 local government term, Brown was forced to resign from Tairāwhiti DHB, where he had been elected, due to an administrative error by the Ministry of Health. The underlying legislation, the New Zealand Public Health and Disability Act 2000, did not allow a person elected to a district health board to also be a member of a second board, but this had been overlooked. Brown remained the appointed chair of the Auckland DHB. Brown was reappointed by the Health Minister Annette King for another term in October 2004, but the new Health Minister, David Cunliffe, chose a new chair for Auckland from December 2007, appointing Patrick Snedden. Brown describes his performance as chair of these boards as a successful "fixer". However, several anonymous senior medical staff have been reported to dispute this.

== Far North mayoralty (2007–2013) ==
In the October 2007 local elections, Brown challenged the three-term mayor of Far North District, Yvonne Sharp, and had a "landslide victory". Brown received 10,081 votes, almost twice as many as Sharp, from the total Far North population of 55,000. He appointed Sally Macauley as deputy mayor. For the October 2010 local elections, Brown, at 64, delayed announcing his candidacy "just in case someone younger and brighter came forward" to continue his work, but when this did not happen, he put his nomination forward in August. He narrowly defeated John Goulter, and appointed Ann Court as deputy mayor. In the October 2013 local elections, Brown was decisively defeated by John Carter (8521 votes to Brown's 2502), who had represented the area in parliament until 2011.

As mayor, Brown received some criticism in an enquiry by the auditor general for blurring roles and was advised "to separate his personal and official roles more carefully in future". In September 2022, Brown stated that he had "learnt a lesson" and this was unlikely to be a problem in Auckland as most of his current business interests are outside Auckland.

== Auckland mayoralty, 1st term (2022–2025) ==
=== 2022 Auckland mayoral campaign ===
On 29 March, Brown launched his Auckland mayoral campaign at an event hosted by the Avondale Business Association, with a plan to "Fix Auckland". His team included National Party strategist and lobbyist and political commentator Matthew Hooton and National Party-aligned strategist Tim Hurdle. Near the end of his campaign Brown said on camera that if successful he wanted to glue pictures of a certain journalist on urinals so people could "pee on him". This drew widespread criticism in the news media.

In the 2022 Auckland mayoral election, Brown gained 45% of the votes cast on a turnout of 35%, compared to the 31% given to Efeso Collins. Collins announced his concession immediately through Twitter, giving support and congratulating Brown on his victory. Collins offered Brown his full support but stepped down from local politics, pointing out issues in the current voting system and particularly low voter turnout in South Auckland. As only the third Mayor of the Auckland "super-city", his election marked a change from the previous 12 years of centre-left leadership of the city.

=== Inauguration and leadership style ===
Following his election as mayor of Auckland, Brown appointed Hooton as his interim head of policy and communications, economic adviser and campaign strategist Tim Hurdle as his interim chief of staff, and Hurdle's wife Jacinda Lean as interim deputy chief of staff. In mid-October 2022, former New Zealand First Member of Parliament Jenny Marcroft became an adviser to Brown. During his first month as Mayor, Brown called for the heads and board members of several council-controlled organisations including Auckland Transport and the Auckland Council's development arm Eke Panuku to resign as part of a leadership shakeup. Auckland Transport's chair Adrienne Young-Cooper resigned shortly after Brown won the mayoral race. In addition, Brown called on Auckland Transport to prioritise roading and carparking networks. He criticised the council-controlled organisation for using transport policy and services as a tool for changing how Aucklanders lived.

He is known for being uncommonly reluctant to accept interviews, having granted just two from 108 requests within his first month as mayor.

Despite being referred to as a centre-right candidate upon his election victory, by November 2023 commentators were noting Brown had "gravitated towards the progressive side of the council" on several policy issues and in terms of political allies.

=== Three Waters ===
During his mayoral election campaign, Brown had campaigned on stopping the Three Waters reform programme, and on 17 October, Brown instructed Auckland's water management company Watercare Services to stop working on the programme, describing it as a "doomed proposal". On 31 October 2022, Brown along with the Mayor of Christchurch Phil Mauger and the Mayor of Waimakariri Dan Gordon proposed an alternative Three Waters plan. Key provisions include retaining the national water regulator Taumata Arowai while preserving local ownership over water resources and infrastructure. Other proposed changes have included providing affordable finance to support investments in water infrastructure and encouraging local water services entities to merge into regional water entities.

=== 2023 Auckland Anniversary Weekend floods ===
In January 2023, Brown oversaw the regional reaction to the 2023 Auckland Anniversary Weekend floods, for which he did not declare a state of emergency for twelve hours after flooding began. He was widely criticised for his slow early response to the unprecedented deluge. When questioned on the poor level of preparedness on RNZ by Kim Hill, in a rare public interview, (he has granted just two during the first month of his mayoralty out of 108 requests), he was unable to confirm whether or not text alerts had been sent out to Aucklanders or if tap water was safe to consume, and claimed it was "a bit early" and "not helpful" to ask if the floods were caused by climate change. Hill clarified to Brown that no texts had been sent. When she said that his administration's "level of inability to cope was terrifying", he then claimed it "will be interesting to see just how well prepared Wellington is when the earthquake strikes." Wellington as a city is extremely vulnerable to earthquakes; this prompted condemnation for his mocking remarks. Hill challenged him for what she described as "a low blow under the circumstances."

In mid-April 2023, Bush International Consulting released an independent review of the Auckland Council's emergency management system during the 2023 Auckland floods. The review criticised the failure of leadership and preparations by key members of Auckland Council, civil defence, and Auckland Emergency Management including Mayor Brown. The review also made 17 recommendations to the council for planning and preparation for future extreme weather events in Auckland. Brown accepted the recommendations of the Bush Report, stating that he had "dropped the ball" during the events of 27 January 2023.

=== 2023–24 Auckland Council budget cuts ===
In early November 2022, Brown ruled out a 12% rates increase for the Auckland region in response to a NZ$270 million shortfall in the Auckland Council's budget for the 2023–24 financial year. Brown blamed the previous mayor Phil Goff for the Auckland Council's budget shortfall. In early December 2022, Brown's proposal to scrap the Auckland Council's ten early childhood centres drew criticism from parents, Kaipātiki Local Board members John and Paula Gillon, and the teachers' union New Zealand Educational Institute.

In late February 2023, Brown unveiled the Auckland Council's proposed 2023–24 budget for public consultation. To address a NZ$295 million funding shortfall, Brown's budget proposed cuts to a range of Council services including early childhood centres, library hours, bus services, homelessness initiatives, and funding for clubs, community groups, events, and environmental initiatives. These cuts are estimated to reduce the council's debt by NZ$125 million. The proposed budget was criticised by the local Citizens Advice Bureau (CAB), Green Party Member of Parliament Chlöe Swarbrick, and First Union, who opposed cuts to Council services and funding. Public consultation on the proposed budget closed on 28 March 2023. By 28 March, the Citizens Advice Bureau had submitted a 20,000-strong submission opposing the council's proposed cuts to the Auckland Council.

On 16 May, The New Zealand Herald reported that 400 jobs at the Auckland Council and its agencies including Auckland Transport, Panuku Development Auckland, and Tātaki Auckland Unlimited would be made redundant as a result of Brown's "cost-cutting" budget. On 17 May, Brown announced that his final budget proposal would include a "significant softening" of planned spending cuts to social services following consulting with the public and fellow councillors. While the Council would continue to fund homelessness initiatives, the Southern Initiative, regional grants, and regional events, arts and culture, Brown defended plans to sell the Council's shares in Auckland International Airport, citing a budget shortfall of NZ$325 million plus NZ$50 million in flood damage. The Council is expected to vote on Wayne's revised budget on 8 June. In addition, Deputy Mayor Desley Simpson said that the Council would lobby for the central government to fund some services including the Citizens Advice Bureau.

On 24 May, Simpson and Auckland Council chief executive Jim Stabback confirmed that Auckland Council would make 500 jobs redundant as a result of Brown's budget cuts. This included 150 jobs at Auckland Council, 200 jobs at Tātaki Auckland Unlimited, 150 jobs at Auckland Transport, and 16 jobs at Panuku Development. Both Simpson and Stabback claimed that these job cuts were part of efforts to make the Council and council-controlled organisations a "leaner" and "more financially-stable" organisation.

On 1 June, Brown offered to reinstate funding for the arts and social services and raise bus drivers' pay by $30 per hour in return for selling off the Council's 18% share in Auckland Airport (worth NZ$2.2 billion) as part of his 2023–24 budget proposal. In justifying his decision, Brown claimed that Auckland Council's airport shares were entirely funded by debt. Brown offered to restore funding to arts and cultural groups, local boards, and the Citizens Advice Bureau. During a media conference promoting his revised budget, Brown criticised several fellow dissenting councillors including Maurice Williamson, Mike Lee, Christine Fletcher, John Watson and Wayne Walker. The press conference drew controversy for excluding several media organisations including TVNZ, Newshub, and Stuff. The Spinoff also reported that Brown had sent the dissenting councilors an angry email calling them "dip shits" following the press conference.

Following two days of debate, the Auckland Council voted to approve an amended version of Brown's budget which involved selling 7% of the council's 18% stake in Auckland Airport and raising home rates by 7% and business rates by 11%. Brown welcomed the amended budget, stating that it would help reduce the Auckland Council's debt while protecting core services and limiting rate increases. Brown's amended budget passed with the support of a majority of Auckland Councillors including the Labour Party Crs Shane Henderson and Richard Hills. Members of Auckland Action Against Poverty voiced opposition to the budget over the partial shares sale and borrowing money to plug the Council's debt.

=== Local Government New Zealand withdrawal ===
On 23 March 2023, Brown cast the deciding vote in the Auckland Council's vote to leave Local Government New Zealand (LGNZ), the representative body for local and regional councils in New Zealand. The council had been deadlocked by a margin of 10 to 10. In justifying the council's decision to withdraw from LGNZ, Brown claimed that members of the body got drunk regularly during conference meetings and that the Auckland Council could negotiate with the New Zealand Government on its own. As part of efforts to reduce debt in the 2023–24 Auckland Council budget, Brown also claimed that exiting the LGNZ would save the Council about NZ$640,000 a year. The Auckland Council's decision to leave LGNZ was criticised by fellow councillors Richard Hills, Andy Baker, Julie Fairey, and LGNZ President Stuart Crosby, with the latter claiming that Brown's actions would hurt Auckland ratepayers.

=== Regional Fuel Tax cancellation ===
In early November 2023, Brown threatened to cancel the final stage of the nearly-complete NZ$1.3 billion Eastern Busway project—the Pakuranga and Botany town centre section is the last stage and is currently under construction—if the incoming National-led government carried out an election pledge to scrap the Auckland Regional Fuel Tax.

On 8 February 2024, Prime Minister Christopher Luxon confirmed that the National-led coalition government would proceed with plans to scrap the Auckland Regional Fuel Tax by June 2024. Though Brown had earlier supported the scrapping of the tax, he argued that the Government needed to come up with other fundraising measures such as congestion charges. In response to the Government's announcement, Brown said that the scrapping of the Regional Fuel Tax would force Auckland ratepayers to pay higher rates and the Council to delay major road and public transportation improvements. Brown urged the Government to fund Auckland's infrastructural projects.

On 13 February, Brown instructed the chairperson of Auckland Transport to cease work on all transportation projects funded by the Regional Fuel Tax, stating that it was not the responsibility of Auckland ratepayers. Affected projects included the second and third stages of the Eastern Busway and the Reeves Road Flyover. In response to Brown's actions, Transport Minister Simeon Brown criticised delays in the Eastern Busway project and said that the Government would simply legislate his funding priorities into law. Despite Brown's order, construction on these transportation projects continued since the Mayor lacked the legal authority to order Auckland Transport to halt its projects, with his statutory responsibilities being policy and budget matters and public communication. Following a query by Auckland councillor Chris Darby, Auckland Council chief executive Phil Wilson confirmed in mid-March 2024 that only the Council's governing body and committees had the authority to direct the activities of Auckland Transport and other council-controlled organisations.

=== Auckland rates dispute ===
In late March 2024, Mayor Brown called on the New Zealand Government to pay NZ$415.3 million worth of GST on rates to the Auckland Council. In response, Local Government Minister Simeon Brown reaffirmed the Government's longstanding policy of not paying rates for central government buildings in Auckland. Brown's rates proposal attracted support from fellow Auckland Councillors, the Independent Māori Statutory Board and Green co-leader and Member of Parliament for Auckland Central Chlöe Swarbrick. Prime Minister Christopher Luxon ruled out the idea of the government paying Auckland Council rates but said that the Government would consider using other funding mechanisms to support the council. Brown's claims that Auckland International Airport did not pay rates were disputed, with the airport telling Newshub it paid NZ$25 million worth of rates annually.

=== Local Water Done Well ===
On 5 May 2024 Brown and Local Government Minister Simeon Brown jointly announced that Auckland would avoid a 25.8 percent rates increase as part of the Government's Local Water Done Well plan.

=== Ports of Auckland ===
On 7 May 2024, Brown abandoned plans to sell the Ports of Auckland on a long-term lease. Brown, Ports of Auckland chief executive Roger Gray and Maritime Union secretary Grant Williams signed an agreement for the Auckland Council to retain port lands, assets and operations. The Ports of Auckland also agreed to return Captain Cook Wharf and Marsden Wharf to Council ownership. In addition, Brown secured greater public access to Bledisloe Wharf. Brown also praised the Ports' board and management for improving the ports' performance and returns.

=== Auckland Transport ===
On 3 December 2024, Brown along with the Transport Minister Simeon Brown announced an overhaul of the council-controlled organisation Auckland Transport's mandate and functions. Key changes include stripping Auckland Transport of various planning powers and reconfiguring the agency as a transport project and services delivery agency. The Auckland Council will be given Auckland Transport's former road-controlling authority powers with responsibility for regional land and public transport planning. Auckland's local boards will also be given decision-making powers over certain transport policies such as parking, speed limits, cycleways and pedestrian crossings. On 5 September 2025, Brown along with Transport Minister Chris Bishop and Auckland Minister Simeon Brown confirmed that the New Zealand Government would introduce legislation reallocating Auckland Transport's policy, planning, road delivery and management functions to the Auckland Council and redesignating the organisation as a public transport delivery entity.

== Auckland mayoralty, 2nd term (2025–present) ==
=== 2025 re-election campaign ===
On 19 February 2025, Brown announced that he would stand for re-election as mayor. Brown was joined on his Fix Auckland ticket by his deputy mayor Desley Simpson in the Ōrākei ward. Fix Auckland candidates were also fielded in the Albany and Manukau wards to try to unseat councillors who had been critical of Brown in the previous term.

Brown was re-elected on 11 October, winning 52.67% of the vote.

=== Palestinian protesters ===
On 25 November, Brown declined a request by representatives of the Palestine Solidarity Network Aotearoa (PSNA) to speak at an Auckland Council governing body meeting on the grounds that the governing body did not have jurisdiction over Palestine. He overruled Crs Mike Lee and John Watson, who attempted to intercede on behalf of the group. Brown responded that the group should bring their request to fly the Palestinian flag on 29 November to the communities committee. In response, the PSNA staged an impromptu protest and chanted for a "Free Palestine." In response, Brown said "Free beer."

=== Rates cap ===
In early December 2025, Brown disagreed with the National-led coalition government's stated policy of imposing a rates cap band of between two and four percent from 1 January 2027. Brown said that the rates cap would make it hard for the Auckland Council to fund various essential services including the City Rail Link.

=== 2025 local elections inquiry and in-person voting ===
On 10 March 2026, Brown and his fellow Auckland councillors submitted a submission to the New Zealand government's inquiry into the 2025 New Zealand local elections. The Auckland Council's submission recommended that postal voting run by private companies shift towards polling booths run by the Electoral Commission and that a national review of voting methods including online voting be held. The Council also recommended that compulsory voting be introduced. Brown said he had no issue with low voter turnout but support a shift towards in-person voting at the 2028 local elections.

In late September 2026, Brown unsuccessfully voted against a motion by the Auckland Council to reinstate in-person voting during the 2028 New Zealand local elections in an effort to boost voter turnout at local elections. Brown had opposed reinstating in-person voting on the grounds that it involved a two percent rise in council rates during a cost of living crisis.

=== Housing intensification ===
On 11 March 2026, Brown expressed disagreement with the National-led government's decision in February 2026 to reduce the number of new homes in Auckland from 2 million to 1.6 million. He confirmed that the Auckland Council will be submitting a letter to the Government in mid-March voicing its views on changes to Auckland's housing intensification plans.

=== Views on China and democracy ===
Following a recent trip to Guangzhou (which is a sister city of Auckland), Brown made remarks praising China's economic growth and criticising Western liberal democracy during an interview with Stuff on 16 November 2026 about the economy and 2026 New Zealand general election. He said:

I was in China at the time and I thought, well, I don't know what’s going on in New Zealand. It's an unfathomable system… and look at the election in America… produced a sort of non-working government. Europe hasn't had a good election for years. Democracy’s had its day. It’s time for something else, really.

During the interview, Brown also said that China had "centrally-managed capitalism" and alleged that New Zealand and the United States did not have capitalism and allow companies to fail, citing the example of the New Zealand government's past bail-out of Fletcher Building. During his visit to Guangzhou, Brown said that Auckland's economic interests and trade relations with China clashed with Wellington's perceived pro-American and pro-Five Eyes outlook during an interview with Chinese state broadcaster CGTN. He also suggested that New Zealand sell its Five Eyes seat to Japan.

The following day, Brown doubled down on his remarks during an interview with The New Zealand Herald's Ryan Bridge on its morning affairs podcast Ryan Bridge TODAY. He praised the perceived lack of red tape in China, saying that the Chinese Government did not need permission to build infrastructure like motorways unlike New Zealand. Brown said that New Zealanders were "too fixated on private property rights," contrasting China's development over the past 40 years with New Zealand's economic decline under successive National and Labour governments. In response, the United States Ambassador to New Zealand Jared Novelly published an X post questioning Brown's intelligence and ability to receive an intelligence briefing. He also wrote that:

The US and New Zealand didn't build two successful democracies by deciding that giving people a "say was too much trouble." Economic growth matters. So do freedom, accountability, and the right to vote your leaders out. And here's the best part, mayor. In a democracy, you’re perfectly free to disagree with me. Just as Aucklanders and New Zealanders are free to disagree with you.

Novelly described Brown's remarks that New Zealand should sell its Five Eyes seat to Japan as "egregious and insulting," and urged him to apologise to During an interview with Radio New Zealand, Novelly suggested that Brown had been "captured" by the Chinese during his trip and said that he would welcome a discussion with the Mayor to present "some alternative viewpoints." In response, the Mayor's office said that Brown would not comment on Novelly's criticism about his remarks about democracy. The following day, the Chinese Embassy weighed in on the Brown-Novelly exchange by encouraging New Zealanders to take advantage of the 30-days visa free policy to visit China and judge for themselves.

Brown's remarks and Novelly's response also attracted commentary from several New Zealand political figures and academics. Acting Prime Minister David Seymour disagreed with Brown, saying that "democracy was a "vastly superior" political system to any other." However, he disagreed with Ambassador Novelly's public reaction, saying "I think the most important thing is to just dial it down a notch." Albany Ward councillor John Watson suggested that Brown had been "captured" by China while Auckland Ratepayers' Alliance spokesperson Jordan Williams called on Brown to resign for his "anti-democratic remarks." University of Canterbury political scientist and China expert Anne-Marie Brady criticised Brown for echoing Chinese Communist Party talking points and called on him to resign as Mayor of Auckland. University of Otago political scientists Robert Patman and Nicholas Khoo described Brown's remarks as "naive and ill-informed." Left-wing blogger Martyn Bradbury and right-wing blogger David Farrar also expressed disagreement with Brown's criticism of democracy. In response, Brown defended his remarks about China and democracy and questioned the motives of his critics. He said that he was not advocating for New Zealand to adopt China's model by praising how they operated but rather to learn from their successes. Brown also criticised the 2026 New Zealand general election campaign, describing it as "a horror story of dreadful interviews for weeks on end" and expressed concerns about "attempts to game" the country's Mixed Member Proportional electoral system.

== External linls ==
- Media related to Wayne Brown (New Zealand politician) at Wikimedia Commons

Political offices
Preceded by Phil Goff	Mayor of Auckland; 2022–present	Incumbent
Preceded by Yvonne Sharp	Mayor of Far North; 2007–2013	Succeeded by John Carter
New office	Chairperson of Northland District Health Board; January–November 2001	Succeeded by Lynette Stewart
New office	Chairperson of Tairāwhiti District Health Board; January 2001 – August 2002	Succeeded by Ingrid Collins
Preceded by Richard Waddel	Chairperson of Auckland District Health Board; December 2001 – December 2007	Succeeded by Patrick Snedden
