= Ross Keenan =

New Zealand chief executive (born 1943)

- Born: Ross Barry Keenan; 21 October 1943 (age 83)
- Occupations: director; chairman

Ross Barry Keenan (born 21 October 1943) is a New Zealand businessman. His early career was in the airline industry in New Zealand, Australia and the United States. Since the 1990s, he has been a company director, professional board member, and chairperson of a variety of private and public companies, and for the public sector. Significant roles include the chairmanship of Counties Manukau District Health Board (2001–2004), the parallel deputy-chairmanship of the three district health boards in the Auckland region (2004–2007), and chairmanship of Ngāi Tahu Holdings (2006–2015). Keenan is the current chairman of New Zealand's largest group of recruitment agencies, AWF Madison, and has chaired one of the constituent companies since 2005.

== Early life ==
Keenan was born on 21 October 1943 in Auckland. His parents were Emett and Joy Keenan. He was educated at Saint Kentigern College, followed by the University of Auckland from where he graduated with a Bachelor of Commerce.

== Professional career ==
Keenan started his career with Air New Zealand. From 1968 to 1972, who was an analyst. Between 1972 and 1982, he held various management positions, including a secondment to Air Pacific (now Fiji Airways). He had a leading role in the merger of New Zealand National Airways Corporation with Air New Zealand. As a consultant from 1982 to 1986, he was involved in building new terminals for Bradley International Airport and airport facilities for the 1984 Summer Olympics. In 1986 and 1987, he was then a consultant to Brierley Investments and Newmans Coach Lines to set up Ansett New Zealand. From 1988, he was managing director of the Newmans Group.

In the early 2000s, Keenan was chairperson for Cabletalk Group Ltd, an Auckland company maintaining and installing telecommunication networks. Keenan was chair of Auckland Regional Transport Network Ltd (ARTNL), the organisation that owned rail infrastructure in Auckland from 2002 (coming out of Tranz Rail assets) to 2004 (when it was merged into the Auckland Regional Transport Authority or ARTA). At some point in the 2000s, he became chair of Auckland City's Metro Water Limited and when Auckland Council was formed through amalgamation in 2010, the various water utilities merged to become Watercare Services, with Keenan the inaugural chair. Keenan stayed in that role until October 2013.

Keenan was a director of Shotover Jet Ltd and became involved with tourism operator Ngāi Tahu Holdings in 2000 when the iwi bought an initial shareholding in the Queenstown-based jetboat company. Keenan joined the Ngāi Tahu board in January 2005 and became chairman in May 2006. In 2007, Ngāi Tahu purchased the remaining shareholding of Shotover Jet Ltd. Keenan retired from the Ngāi Tahu board in 2015.

Keenan was one of the original chairperson of the country's district health boards. He chaired the Counties Manukau District Health Board from its inception in January 2001 until December 2004, when Patrick Snedden was appointed to the chair by the Minister of Health, Annette King. From December 2004, King appointed Keenan deputy chair of the three district health boards in the Auckland region (the other two being Auckland and Waitemata DHBs) to achieve better collaboration. In March 2007, Keenan became involved in a dispute over alleged conflict of interest involving a blood-testing company (Labtests) and the three DHBs in Auckland. Keenan was particularly implicated as deputy-chair of all three DHBs, as well as being chair of the collective known as Auckland Regional District Health Boards (ARDHB). At the next round of appointments following the 2007 local elections, Keenan lost his three DHB positions. (Note: Deputy chair appointments for December 2007 were Harry Burkhardt at Auckland DHB and Prof Max Abbott at Waitemata DHB. The government does not appear to have gazetted who was appointed deputy chair at Counties Manukau DHB, but in either case Keenan was not one of the eleven members after December 2007.)

Keenan is currently chairman of AWF Madison, the company's largest recruitment company. AWF Madison is listed on the New Zealand Exchange (NZX) and made up of four constituent companies. One of those companies is AWF, previously known as Allied Work Force, and Keenan has been its chairman since April 2005.

Keenan is a fellow of the Chartered Institute of Logistics and Transport (FCILT).

== Private life ==
Keenan married Elizabeth Freer, the daughter of Dennison and Betty Freer. They had three daughters. In the late 1980s, they lived in Howick.

== See also ==
- List of chairpersons of district health boards
