= Judith Stanway =

New Zealand economist and chairwoman

Judith Mary Stanway is a New Zealand economist and chairwoman of multiple organisations, including formerly the Lakes District Health Board.

== Early life and family ==
Stanway was born in Waverley, South Taranaki. She attended school in New Plymouth, and graduated from Waikato University with a Master in Economics. Her husband is Ross Stanway, CEO of Realty Services. They had four daughters together. As Ross wanted to become a farmer, Stanway became a member of the New Zealand Institute of Chartered Accountants, realising that small towns are unlikely to need an economist. In 1984 they moved to a sheep and cattle farm in Rotorua, which they sold a decade later, and now live split between an apartment in Rotorua and a house in Mount Maunganui. They have eight grandchildren as of 2015.

== Career ==
Stanway previously lectured economics at University of Auckland and the Auckland University of Technology.

Stanway has worked for BDO for 27 years, leaving in 2015. Of that, she served on the national board for 15 years, and was chairwoman for five years. For nine years, Stanway directed Lakeland Health and the Lakes District Health Board, where she was chairwoman for four years. She has also been chairwoman of Rotorua Primary Health Organisation, the Charities Commission starting in 2010. In 1990 Stanway was appointed to the board of New Zealand Māori Arts and Crafts Institute (Te Puia), which she later became deputy chair, and later stepped down from in 2006. In 2013 Stanway was promoted to deputy chair at Scion. As of 2015 she is also chairwoman of the Lake Rotorua Incentives Board.

She was awarded Rotorua Business Person of the Year in 2012. At the time she was the only woman to do so. She has also won the Sir Peter Blake Leadership Award. In 2014 she was awarded a New Zealand Institute of Chartered Accountants Fellowship. Stanway is also a fellow of the NZ Institute of Directors.

When primary health organisations (PHOs) were new in New Zealand, she expressed support for them.
