= 1998 Auckland City Council election =

Local election in New Zealand

- 10 October 1998

All 19 seats on the Auckland City Council
	First party	Second party
Party	Citizens & Ratepayers	City Vision
Last election	17	N/A
Seats won	7	5
Seat change	▼10	▲5
	Third party	Fourth party
Party	Labour	Auckland Now
Last election	2	N/A
Seats won	2	2
Seat change	0	▲2

The 1998 Auckland City Council election was part of the 1998 New Zealand local elections, to elect members to sub-national councils and boards. The polling was conducted using the first-past-the-post electoral method.

== Council ==
The Auckland City Council consisted of a mayor and nineteen councillors elected from seven wards (Avondale-Roskill, Balmoral, Eastern Bays, Hauraki Gulf Islands, Hobson, Penrose and Western Bays).

=== Mayor ===
1998 Auckland mayoral election
Party	Candidate	Votes	%	±%
Independent	Christine Fletcher	48,181	40.51	
Independent	Les Mills	43,151	36.28	−14.68
Independent	Richard Holden	12,477	10.49	
Independent	Lynda Topp	4,492	3.77	
Green	Sue Bradford	3,828	3.21	
Independent	Bill Christian	1,977	1.66	
Independent	Robert Rakete	1,401	1.17	−0.50
Christians Against Abortion	Phil O'Connor	940	0.79	−0.59
Independent	Sue Henry	781	0.65	−0.73
McGillicuddy Serious	Derek Craig	452	0.38	
Independent	Phill Matthias	448	0.37	
Independent	Tui McLeod	319	0.26	
Communist League	Felicity Coggan	298	0.25	
Independent	Peter Ralph	166	0.13	
Majority		5,030	4.23	
Turnout		118,911	51.68	+2.18

=== Avondale-Roskill Ward ===
The Avondale-Roskill Ward elected four members to the Auckland City Council

Avondale-Roskill Ward
Party	Candidate	Votes	%	±%
Citizens & Ratepayers	Phil Raffills	8,509	37.64	+9.18
Citizens & Ratepayers	David Hay	8,429	37.28	
City Vision	Vern Walsh	7,241	32.03	
Citizens & Ratepayers	Doug Astley	7,122	31.50	
Independent	Brian Maude	6,869	30.38	−8.14
Independent	Kathy Henderson	6,277	27.76	
Citizens & Ratepayers	Dawn Mullins	5,978	26.44	
Independent	Gilbert Myles	5,942	26.28	
City Vision	Corinne McLaren	5,740	25.39	
City Vision	Deirdre Milne	5,701	25.22	
City Vision	Jude Russell Mathews	5,191	22.96	
Auckland Now	Grahame Breed	4,245	18.77	
Independent	Geoff Abbott	3,716	16.43	
Independent	Patricia Crosswell	3,341	14.78	
Auckland Now	Joel Fotu	3,195	14.13	
Independent	Bev Harris	2,918	12.90	
Majority		253	1.11	
Turnout		22,604		

=== Balmoral Ward ===
The Balmoral Ward elected three members to the Auckland City Council

Balmoral Ward
Party	Candidate	Votes	%	±%
City Vision	Maire Leadbeater	5,633	37.24	
Citizens & Ratepayers	Frank Ryan	5,353	35.39	
City Vision	Kay McKelvie	4,576	30.25	
Citizens & Ratepayers	Patricia Goddard	4,328	28.61	
City Vision	Robert Leslie Delmer	4,268	28.21	
Auckland Now	Amanda Jane Reynolds	3,986	26.35	
Citizens & Ratepayers	Gordon Johns	3,727	24.64	
Auckland Now	Sam Bassett	3,372	22.29	
Auckland Now	Mark Joseph Donnelly	3,303	21.83	
Independent	Greg McKeown	2,865	18.94	
Independent	Steven John Atwood	2,010	13.28	
Independent	Jill Bolland	1,952	12.90	
Majority		248	1.63	
Turnout		15,125		

=== Eastern Bays Ward ===
The Eastern Bays Ward elected two members to the Auckland City Council

Eastern Bays Ward
Party	Candidate	Votes	%	±%
Citizens & Ratepayers	Juliet Yates	7,794	51.42	−38.19
Independent	Gray Bartlett	5,579	36.81	−43.93
Citizens & Ratepayers	Colin Davis	5,204	34.33	−29.23
Auckland Now	Anna Louise Brewer	3,715	24.51	
Auckland Now	Chris Diack	3,431	22.63	
City Vision	Nicholas O'Flaherty	2,423	15.98	
City Vision	Jane Wells	2,166	14.29	
Majority		375	2.47	
Turnout		15,156		

=== Hauraki Gulf Islands Ward ===
The Hauraki Gulf Islands Ward elected one member to the Auckland City Council

Hauraki Gulf Islands Ward
Party	Candidate	Votes	%	±%
Independent	Faye Storer	1,475	45.93	
Independent	Tim Hubbard	1,099	34.22	
Auckland Now	Adrian Chisholm	637	19.83	
Majority		376	11.70	
Turnout		3,211		

=== Hobson Ward ===
The Hobson Ward elected three members to the Auckland City Council

Hobson Ward
Party	Candidate	Votes	%	±%
Auckland Now	Victoria Carter	8,903	53.22	
Citizens & Ratepayers	Barbara Goodman	8,012	47.89	−9.41
Auckland Now	Jonathan Olsen	5,851	34.97	
Citizens & Ratepayers	John Strevens	5,659	33.82	−14.57
Citizens & Ratepayers	Ken Graham	4,835	28.90	
Auckland Now	Vivienne Feijen	4,762	28.46	
City Vision	Coralie van Camp	3,324	19.87	
City Vision	David Haigh	3,085	18.44	
Independent	Allan Spence	2,772	16.57	
City Vision	John Ernest Waide	2,355	14.07	
Independent	Wayne George Young	626	3.74	
Majority		192	1.14	
Turnout		16,728		

=== Penrose Ward ===
The Penrose Ward elected four members to the Auckland City Council

Penrose Ward
Party	Candidate	Votes	%	±%
Labour	Richard Northey	8,942	51.73	
Independent	Bill Christian	7,660	44.31	
Labour	Jan Welch	7,448	43.09	
Citizens & Ratepayers	Catherine Harland	5,961	34.48	
Independent	Jason Keiller	5,020	29.04	
Independent	Sue Henry	4,764	27.56	
Citizens & Ratepayers	Alistair James Page	4,520	26.15	
City Vision	Trevor Barnard	4,515	26.12	
Auckland Now	John Davies	4,345	25.13	
Auckland Now	Angus Stuart Ogilvie	3,960	22.91	
Auckland Now	Carolyn Fay Martin	3,755	21.72	
Auckland Now	Edgar Thomas Henson	3,235	18.71	
Independent	Ruta Malota-Romanovsky	3,213	18.58	
Independent	Tui McLeod	1,796	10.39	
Majority		941	5.44	
Turnout		17,284		

=== Western Bays Ward ===
The Western Bays Ward elected two members to the Auckland City Council

Western Bays Ward
Party	Candidate	Votes	%	±%
City Vision	Bruce Hucker	7,323	60.07	+4.07
City Vision	Penny Sefuvia	6,210	50.94	+4.26
Auckland Now	Gary Gotlieb	4,314	35.39	−6.18
Auckland Now	Greg Moyle	3,332	27.33	
Independent	Chris Cotton	2,696	22.11	
Independent	David Stewart	502	4.11	
Majority		1,896	15.55	
Turnout		12,189		

== Other local elections ==
=== Auckland Regional Council - Auckland Isthmus Ward ===
The Auckland Isthmus Ward elects four members to the Auckland Regional Council

Auckland Isthmus Ward
Party	Candidate	Votes	%	±%
Citizens & Ratepayers	Phil Warren	41,358	44.62	−17.49
Citizens & Ratepayers	Patricia Thorp	33,830	36.50	−24.01
City Vision	Mike Lee	33,559	36.21	+0.38
City Vision	Jack Henderson	31,269	33.74	
Auckland Now	Maureen Fletcher	31,223	33.69	
Auckland Now	Deborah Coddington	30,518	32.93	
City Vision	John Hill	28,151	30.37	
Citizens & Ratepayers	Selwyn Bartlett	27,533	29.70	−22.20
Auckland Now	Shane Firth	26,475	28.56	
City Vision	Matthew Bostwick	26,960	29.09	
Citizens & Ratepayers	Ron Greer	25,866	27.91	−23.14
Auckland Now	Alex Swney	22,252	24.01	
Independent	Harry Palmer	11,705	12.63	
Majority		46	0.04	
Turnout		92,675		
