= Stewart Edward =

New Zealand cricketer (born 1943)

Stewart Edward MNZM JP
Personal information
- Full name: Stewart James Edward
- Born: 1 November 1943 (age 83); Hamilton, New Zealand
- Batting: Right handed
- Bowling: Right-arm medium

Domestic team information
- Years: Team
- 1964/65–1967/68: Otago

Career statistics
Competition	First-class
Matches	3
Runs scored	54
Batting average	9.00
100s/50s	0/0
Top score	13
Balls bowled	492
Wickets	2
Bowling average	101.00
5 wickets in innings	0
10 wickets in match	0
Best bowling	2/49
Catches/stumpings	3/0
- Source: CricketArchive, 14 April 2020

Stewart James Edward MNZM JP (born 1 November 1943) is a New Zealand former cricketer. He trained as a dentist and has been board chairman of the Lakes District Health Board. He played three first-class matches for Otago between 1964 and 1968.

In the 1997 Queen's Birthday Honours, Edward was appointed a Member of the New Zealand Order of Merit, for services to dentistry and the community. He worked for 48 years as a dentist in Rotorua, retiring in 2018.

== See also ==
- List of Otago representative cricketers
