= Tairāwhiti District Health Board =

District health board in Gisborne District, New Zealand

- Location of the Tairāwhiti DHB (green) in New Zealand
- Formation: 1 January 2001; 25 years ago
- Founder: New Zealand Government
- Dissolved: 1 July 2022; 4 years ago
- Legal status: Active
- Purpose: DHB
- Services: Health and disability services
- Parent organization: Ministry of Health
- Website: www.hauoratairawhiti.org.nz

The Tairāwhiti District Health Board (Tairāwhiti DHB), branded as Hauora Tairāwhiti since 2015, was a district health board with the focus on providing healthcare to the Gisborne District of New Zealand. In July 2022, the Tairāwhiti DHB was merged into the national health service Te Whatu Ora (Health New Zealand).

== History ==
The Tairāwhiti District Health Board, like most other district health boards, came into effect on 1 January 2001 established by the New Zealand Public Health and Disability Act 2000.

On 1 July 2022, the Tairāwhiti DHB and the other district health boards were disestablished, with Te Whatu Ora (Health New Zealand) assuming their former functions and operations including hospitals and health services. The Tairāwhiti DHB was brought under Te Whatu Ora's Te Manawa Taki division.

== Geographic area ==
The board serves the Gisborne District, as specified in Schedule 1 of the New Zealand Public Health and Disability Act 2000 and based on territorial authority and ward boundaries as constituted as at 1 January 2001. The area can be adjusted through an Order in Council.

== Governance ==
The initial board was fully appointed. Since the 2001 local elections, the board has been partially elected (seven members) and in addition, up to four members get appointed by the Minister of Health. The minister also appoints the chairperson and deputy-chair from the pool of eleven board members.

=== Chairpersons ===
Wayne Brown had previously been the chairperson of the Hospital and Health Service (HHS) and he was appointed as the inaugural chair of the Tairāwhiti DHB by Health Minister Annette King. Concurrently, he also served as chair of Northland DHB. Brown was forced to resign as chair of the Tairāwhiti DHB in August 2002 due to an administrative error by the Ministry of Health. After the first DHB elections in October 2001, he had been appointed as chair for both Auckland and Tairāwhiti DHBs, but had also been elected onto the Tairāwhiti board. As an elected member, he was not permitted to also hold a position on another district health board.

The following table gives a list of chairpersons of Tairāwhiti District Health Board:

Name	Portrait	Start	End	Source
Wayne Brown		January 2001	August 2002	
Ingrid Collins		March 2003	December 2010	
David Scott		December 2010	December 2019	
Kim Ngārimu		December 2019	present	

== Hospitals ==
=== Public hospitals ===
- Gisborne Hospital (38.638137°S 178.003488°E) in Lytton, Gisborne has 115 beds and provides mental health, children's health, maternity, surgical, and medical services.

=== Private hospitals ===
- Chelsea Hospital (38.664809°S 178.018221°E) in Gisborne Central has 16 beds and provides surgical and medical services.
