= Te Whatu Ora =

New Zealand public health agency

Health New Zealand – Te Whatu Ora

Agency overview
- Formed: 1 July 2022
- Preceding agencies: District health boards; Auckland District Health Board; Bay of Plenty District Health Board; Canterbury District Health Board; Capital and Coast District Health Board; Counties Manukau District Health Board; Hawke's Bay District Health Board; Hutt Valley District Health Board; Lakes District Health Board; MidCentral District Health Board; Nelson Marlborough District Health Board; Northland District Health Board; South Canterbury District Health Board; Southern District Health Board; Tairāwhiti District Health Board; Waikato District Health Board; Wairarapa District Health Board; Waitematā District Health Board; West Coast District Health Board; Whanganui District Health Board
- Jurisdiction: New Zealand
- Headquarters: 133 Molesworth Street, Thorndon, Wellington
- Employees: ~80,000
- Agency executive: Dale Bramley, Chief Executive Officer
- Key document: Pae Ora (Healthy Futures) Act 2022
- Website: tewhatuora.govt.nz

Health New Zealand – Te Whatu Ora (Māori for 'the weaving for wellness') is the primary publicly funded healthcare system of New Zealand. It was established by the New Zealand Government to replace the country's 20 district health boards (DHBs) on 1 July 2022. Health New Zealand is charged with working alongside the Public Health Agency to manage the provision of healthcare services in New Zealand.

== Mandate and responsibilities ==
Health New Zealand is responsible for the planning and commissioning of health services as well as the functions of the 20 former district health boards. The Ministry of Health remains responsible for setting health policy, strategy and regulation.

As of 2022, the agency is New Zealand's largest employer, consolidating the DHBs' combined work force of 80,000, with an estimated annual operating budget of NZ$20 billion and an asset base of about NZ$24 billion.

Health New Zealand is responsible for funding Healthline New Zealand (0800 611 116) a free over-the-phone health service that operates 24/7. The telephone is used for non-emergency health advice from nurses and paramedics. The telephone service is not to be confused with the 111 emergency telephone number which handles emergency medical events.

== Leadership and structure ==
As of July 2025, Health New Zealand – Te Whatu Ora is headed by a governance board led by chair Professor Lester Levy. Other board members include deputy chair Dr Andrew Connolly, Roger Jarrold, Dr Frances Hughes, Parekawhia McLean, Peter McCardle, and Terry Moore. In addition, Hamiora Bowkett was appointed as Crown Observer to support and monitor the public health service. In addition, Health NZ is led by an infrastructure committee led by chair Dr Margaret Wilsher. Its first Chief Executive is Dale Bramley.

Health New Zealand consists of four regional divisions, with regional commissioning boards overseeing the provisioning of primary and community health services. These four regional divisions consist of:

- Northern: Northland, Waitematā, Auckland and Counties Manukau;
- Te Manawa Taki: Waikato, Lakes, Bay of Plenty, Tairāwhiti, Taranaki;
- Central: MidCentral, Whanganui, Capital & Coast/Hutt Valley, Hawke's Bay, Wairarapa;
- Te Waipounamu: Canterbury Region, West Coast Region, Nelson Marlborough, Southern, and South Canterbury.

As the successor to the district health boards, Health New Zealand is responsible for running all hospitals and health services including the DHB's 12 public health units and the former Health Promotion Agency. These public health units dealt with areas such as drinking water, infectious disease control, tobacco, and alcohol control.

== History ==
=== Announcement ===
On 21 April 2021, Minister of Health Andrew Little announced plans to replace the country's 20 district health boards with a new public health agency called "Health New Zealand", which would be modelled after the United Kingdom's National Health Service. Health New Zealand would work alongside a new Māori Health Authority, which was to be responsible for setting Māori health policies and overseeing the provision of Māori health services. In addition, a Public Health Authority was established to centralise public health work.

The National Party's health spokesperson Shane Reti criticised the government's plan to replace the district health boards with a new centralised agency. He claimed that centralisation took away autonomy from local regions and suggested that the government instead explore the consolidation of some functions such as asset management across the DHBs rather than abolishing them entirely. Reti claimed that the public was unaware of the cost of the government's planned restructuring and the potential disruption it would cause.

=== Formation ===
In mid-September 2021, the government announced the interim board members of Health New Zealand. The agency was chaired by the economist Rob Campbell. Other board members included Sharon Shea (co-chair of the interim Māori Health Authority and chair of the Bay of Plenty District Health Board), former National MP Amy Adams, chartered accountant and lawyer Cassandra Crowley, former Labour MP Mark Gosche, former Director General of Health Karen Poutasi, senior executive Vanessa Stoddart, and general practitioner, kidney specialist and Medical Council of New Zealand chair Curtis Walker. In December 2021, Margie Apa was appointed chief executive of Te Whatu Ora; she resigned from the role in February 2025.

In October 2021, the government introduced a bill to formally entrench various health reforms including the replacement of the district health board system with Health New Zealand. The bill passed on 7 June 2022. and became the Pae Ora (Healthy Futures) Act 2022.

On 19 May 2022, the government allocated NZ$13.2 billion from the 2022 New Zealand budget to facilitate the establishment of the Health New Zealand and the Māori Health Authority over the next four years. This amount included $11.1 billion to address the cost pressures of the previous district health board system and $2.1 billion to set up the two new health entities.

On 1 July 2022, Health New Zealand formally launched as Te Whatu Ora, with the new entity assuming responsibility for all hospitals and health services formerly run by the district health boards. In addition, the 12 public health units, which operated within the DHBs, and the former Health Promotion Agency were transferred into Te Whatu Ora. The new entity also assumed the commissioning functions of the Health Ministry and the commissioning and delivery functions of the DHBs.

=== 2023 dismissal of chair ===
In late February 2023, Te Whatu Ora's chair Rob Campbell criticised the National Party's proposal to scrap the Labour Government's Three Waters reform programme in a LinkedIn post and accused its leader Christopher Luxon of "dog whistling" on the issue of co-governance. Campbell's remarks were criticised by National MP Simeon Brown and ACT Party leader David Seymour, who accused him of breaching the Public Service Commission's policy requiring the directors of Crown entities to remain politically neutral. Campbell defended his remarks, stating that they were made in his capacity as a private citizen and denied violating the Commission's political impartiality policy.

On 27 February, Prime Minister Chris Hipkins criticised Campbell's Three Waters remarks as "inappropriate." On 28 February, Health Minister Ayesha Verrall used her discretionary powers under section 36 of the Crown Entities Act 2004 to relieve Campbell of his position as head of Te Whatu Ora. Though Campbell had apologised to Luxon and Verrall, the latter had demanded that he resign by 10:30 am on 28 February. Campbell had refused to resign and defended his right to criticise National's Three Waters policy.

=== 2023 Winter Health Plan ===
On 4 May 2023, Verrall announced that Te Whatu Ora would play a leading role in the Government's 2023 Winter Health Plan that would include 24 initiatives to support community care and reduce hospital demand. These initiatives include using telehealth services to support primary care, ambulances and paramedics, remote patient monitoring, equipping pharmacies to treat minor ailments, community radiology services, increasing primary options for acute care, incentives to support aged residential care, improving access to allied health and community response services, investing in mental health services, bivalent COVID-19 boosters, and influenza vaccination campaigns, recruiting international nurses and health professionals, and continuing to invest in COVID-19 monitoring, response, and services.

=== 2023 Crown observer ===
In mid December 2023, Health Minister Shane Reti appointed Ken Whelan as a Crown observer to Health New Zealand, citing ongoing challenges that the agency was facing following the previous Labour Government's 2022 health reforms.

=== 2024–2025 leadership changes ===
On 12 April 2024, Health NZ chair Dame Karen Poutasi resigned as chair and board member prior to the end of her 18-month term, effective immediately. Health Minister Shane Reti said that Poutasi had been asked to remain in the role until a successor could be appointed in May 2024.

By 17 July 2024, three of Health NZ's board members, Amy Adams, Vanessa Stoddart and Dr Curtis Walker, had decided not to renew their terms while two others, Naomi Ferguson and Jeff Lowe, had resigned prior to the end of their terms. This left Lester Levy and Roger Jarrold as the two remaining board members. On 23 July, Health Minister Shane Reti and Prime Minister Christopher Luxon installed the last remaining board member Lester Levy as commissioner and chair of the organisation. According to Reti, these changes came amidst report that Health NZ was heading towards a NZ$1.4 billion deficit by the end of the financial year, with the agency spending $130 million a month. Luxon also criticised the organisation's lack of performance management, centralised and bloated bureaucracy, and financial mismanagement. The Sixth National Government also confirmed plans to split Health NZ into four regions, with each headed by a deputy chief executive.

On 7 July 2025, Health Minister Simeon Brown re-established Health NZ's leadership board. Levy was appointed as the board's chair for a period of 12 months. Other board members included deputy chair and senior surgeon Dr Andrew Connolly, Roger Jarrold, Dr Frances Hughes, Parekawhia McLean, Peter McCardle, and Terry Moore. In addition, Hamiora Bowkett was appointed as Crown Observer to the organisation. Brown also announced the formation of a new infrastructure committee responsible for delivering critical health projects. The infrastructure committee consists of chair Dr Margaret Wilsher, Mark Binns, James Christmas, Sarah Sinclair, Evan Davies, and Roger Jarrold.

== Issues and controversies ==
=== Diversity and representation ===
In mid August 2022, Radio New Zealand reported that Health New Zealand lacked Asian members on the organisation's 51 leadership roles despite Asians making up 15% of New Zealand's population according to the 2018 New Zealand census. Population and migration researcher Dr Francis Collins advocated legislation ensuring greater minority representation in leadership and decision-making. Asian medical professionals Doctor Carlos Lam and Vishal Niwi of the Asian Network criticised the lack of Asian representation and input within Health New Zealand's leadership. In response, Health NZ's chief executive Margie Apa claimed that the organisation was committed to diversity in its workforce but admitted they had not set targets for representation on the grounds that its employees and management were required to serve all communities equitably.

In March 2024, The New Zealand Herald reported that a Health NZ manager had instructed a staff member to stop using the Māori language greetings in emails after two patients objected. The staff member disagreed and shared her story in a Reddit post. In response, Health NZ's chief people officer, Andrew Slater, described the manager's response as an overreaction. Former Health NZ chair Rob Campbell criticised the agency for its lack of "cultural leadership" and for failing to address racism.

=== Weekly meetings ===
In late August 2022, Health NZ was criticised by the opposition National Party's health spokesperson Shane Reti for abandoning the previous district health boards' practice of holding public monthly meetings. Health NZ has closed its meetings to the public and media, releasing only brief summaries of its board meetings. The organisation's chair Rob Campbell defended the decision to exclude the public and media from its initial board meetings on the grounds that they dealt with sensitive issues such as staff appointments and Cabinet decisions. Campbell and chief executive Margie Apa held half-an-hour media briefings following board meetings to discuss the contents of their meetings with the media.

=== Equity Adjustor Score ===
In February 2023, Te Whatu Ora Te Toka Tumai Auckland introduced an Equity Adjustor Score, which seeks to reduce inequity in the New Zealand health system by using an algorithm to prioritise patients based on clinical priority, time spent on the waitlist, geographical location, ethnicity and deprivation level. In June 2023, the Equity Adjustor Score has sought to improve health outcomes for Māori and Pasifika New Zealanders, who have experienced higher levels of deprivation and health problems than other ethnic groups in New Zealand. Health Minister Verrall, Pasifika health expert Sir Collin Tukuitonga, Te Toka Tumai Auckland interim lead Mike Shepherd, and University of Auckland medical education senior lecturer Mataroria Lyndon defended the Adjustor Score's prioritisation of Māori and Pasifika, citing inequalities in the health system, higher obesity rates, and lower life expectancy within these communities. National Party health spokesperson Shane Reti and ACT Party leader David Seymour objected to the Adjustor Score's ethnic criterion, describing it as racial discrimination that did not properly address social and health inequalities.

By 1 August 2024, Health NZ had dropped the Equity Adjustor Score after a review concluded it was "legally and ethically justifiable but didn't follow best practice." This review had been supported by Health Minister Shane Reti. Health NZ instructed hospitals to stop using the algorithm for prioritising non-urgent waitlists until the development of a new comprehensive strategy.

=== 2023 vaccine data breach ===
In early December 2023, Te Whatu Ora investigated an administrator who was accused of spreading COVID-19 misinformation using COVID-19 vaccination data obtained from the organisation. The employee had allegedly developed a database for the vaccine rollout and had been interviewed on a conspiracy theory website. On 3 December, Te Whatu Ora lodged a police complaint against him over the vaccine rollout data breach. On 4 December, he was identified as Barry Young, who appeared at the Wellington District Court on the charge of accessing a computer system for dishonest purposes, which carries a maximum seven year prison sentence. After being released on bail on 5 December, Young was interviewed by American conspiracy theorist Alex Jones on his website InfoWars. On 8 December, Te Whatu Ora enlisted the services of international cybersecurity and forensic experts to investigate the COVID-19 vaccine data leak.

On 19 December, after Te Whatu Ora previously said that the data was anonymised, the agency admitted that the data could make identifications of people, with considerable effort. By 16 February 2024, Health NZ acknowledged that at least 12,000 people had their personal information compromised. Several of the affected individuals had their data leaked by a US blog.

=== 2025 "pregnant women" directive ===
In mid April 2025, Radio New Zealand reported that Associate Health Minister Casey Costello had issued a letter to Health New Zealand on 27 March 2025 ordering the health service to use "clear language" in its communications about health issues. Costello had stated: "Recent documents that have reached my office from the Ministry of Health have referred to women as 'pregnant people', 'people with a cervix' or 'individuals capable of childbearin' [sic]. Only women and people of the female sex can get pregnant and birth a child no matter how they identify." Costello's directive was criticised by Victoria University of Wellington senior lecturer George Parker and The Spinoff editor Madeleine Chapman for rolling back the use of "inclusive language" in official health communications and discriminating against the LGBTQ community.

=== Cutbacks ===
In 2024, the Sixth National Government issued a directive for public service departments and agencies to find cost savings of either 6.5% or 7.5% through various measures including job cuts and cutting expenditure. By 3 December 2024, Health New Zealand had laid off 2,042 employees, including over 500 confirmed redundancies and 1500 other data and digital roles as well as many in the National Public Health Service. In addition, Health NZ also eliminated several commissioning, special services, and senior leadership roles including the Māori health director and chief advisor. In July 2023, Health New Zealand had an estimated workforce of 90,000 employees.

In mid January 2025, Health New Zealand proposed cutting 54.7 roles (or 4.8%) of staff members at the National Public Health Service. While a Health NZ spokesperson reassured Health Minister Reti that the proposed cuts would not affect the organisation's capabilities, the proposal was criticised by several health experts including epidemiologist Professor Michael Baker, public health Professor Collin Tukuitonga and Associate Professor Richard Egan, who said that the cuts would have an adverse impact on the delivery of public health services particularly for Māori people and Pasifika New Zealanders.

In mid February 2025, Health NZ proposed reducing its core 2,400 IT staff by half. The Public Service Association (PSA) disputed the agency's claims that these data and digital changes would prioritise patient safety and privacy. On 13 February, the PSA legally challenged Health NZ's proposed digital and IT job cuts, claiming they breached employment law. On 30 April, Health NZ confirmed that it would slash a third of its IT workforce. Following negotiations with the PSA, 1,460 IT staff were retained, 175 more than the initial redundancy proposal.

On 15 April 2025, the Public Service Association disclosed that Health NZ had proposed cutting 338 roles in its people and culture team, reducing the unit from 1,632 to 1,294 personnel. In response to queries by Radio New Zealand, Health NZ's interim chief human resources officer Fiona McCarthy stated that the agency was focusing on strengthening its frontline services in order to meet national health and mental health targets, with the goal of completing the changes by mid-2025.

In mid July 2025, Health New Zealand announced plans to close Rauaroha Segar House, a publicly-funded mental health facility in Auckland's Khyber Pass. The closure will affect seven staff members and residents of Segar House. The PSA's national secretary Fleur Fitzsimons and Labour's mental health spokesperson Ingrid Leary opposed the closure of Segar House, saying that it would have an adverse impact on staff and residents. The PSA also circulated a petition opposing Segar House's closure, which had attracted 2,600 signatures by 17 July.

In mid-December 2025, Health Minister Simeon Brown ordered Health New Zealand's four regional divisions to set efficiency targets of between 2-4.9% in order to find NZ$510 million in cost-savings: Northern 3.7% ($170 million), Midland 2% ($55 million), Central 4.1% ($124 million) and Southern 4.9% ($161 million). These cuts would focus on "back office" functions, with the cost-savings being redirected towards patient care and meeting government health targets without making cuts to clinical care services. In response, the Association of Salaried Medical Specialists expressed concerns that further cutbacks would make it difficult for clinicians to care for patients.

=== Car parking U-turn ===
In mid-February 2026, Health New Zealand abandoned plans to charge market rates for hospital car parks. The health workers' unions, the Association of Salaried Medical Specialists and the New Zealand Nurses Organisation, welcomed the health service for listening to doctors and nurses.

=== Artificial intelligence ===
In February 2026 the Minister of Health, Simeon Brown, announced that AI scribes had been introduced in emergency departments throughout the country, after trials in Hawke's Bay and Whanganui emergency departments. It was claimed that the scribe allows each doctor to see one additional patient per shift. Dr Sylvia Boys, from the Association of Salaried Medical Specialists, raised concerns around patient privacy, and accuracy of AI transcriptions, and the functionality in situations where doctors are treating multiple patients. In March of the same year, mental health and addiction services staff in Rotorua Lakes District were told to stop using AI to assist with or write clinical notes due to security, privacy and accountability concerns.
