= Bob Francis (referee) =

Bob Francis CNZM QSO MBE JP
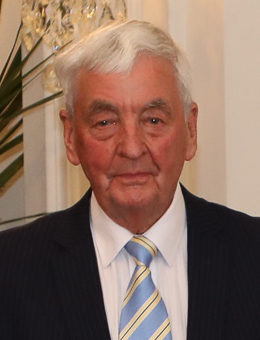
- Francis in 2021

21st Mayor of Masterton
- In office 1986–2007
- Preceded by: Frank Cody
- Succeeded by: Garry Daniell

Chair of the Wairarapa District Health Board
- In office 2006–2013
- Preceded by: Doug Matheson
- Succeeded by: Derek Milne

Personal details
- Born: Robert Charles Francis; 27 July 1942 (age 84)
- Spouse: Eva Francis (died 2014)
- Children: 4

Rugby union career
Refereeing career
Years	Competition	Apps
	Test matches	10
	Ranfurly Shield	12

Robert Charles Francis (27 July 1942) is a New Zealand politician and former rugby union referee. Francis was the mayor of Masterton from 1986 until 2007, and chair of the Wairarapa District Health Board from 2006 to 2013.

== Early years ==
Francis originally played rugby union, but stopped due to asthma and instead concentrated on refereeing.

== Referee career ==
Francis started as a referee aged 18 in 1961. He went on to control almost 100 first-class matches. This included 12 Ranfurly Shield games and 10 test matches. During the 1980s, he was rated the world's number one referee.

Francis later served as the chairman of the New Zealand Referee Association for 14 years and was on the referee selection panel for several Rugby World Cups. In 2014, at the World Rugby Awards, he was awarded the International Rugby Board Referee Award for distinguished service to the game as a referee.

== Political career ==
Francis was elected as Mayor of Masterton in 1986 and held the position for 21 years, until 2007. In the 1991 New Year Honours, he was appointed a Member of the Order of the British Empire for services to local government and the community.

In 2005 Francis, a long time member of the New Zealand Labour Party, was expected to be selected as its candidate for Wairarapa electorate at the 2005 general election to replace the retiring Georgina Beyer. However the party instead selected Denise MacKenzie. Francis had previously turned down an approach by the New Zealand National Party to contest the electorate for them in the 2002 election.

In 2006 Francis was appointed as the chairperson of the Wairarapa District Health Board as well as the board of the Fire Service Commission. He chaired the Wairarapa DHB until 2013.

In 2012 Francis was appointed as a member of the Capital and Coast District Health Board.

== Honours and awards ==
In 1990, Francis was awarded the New Zealand 1990 Commemoration Medal. In the 1991 New Year Honours, he was appointed Member of the Order of the British Empire (MBE) for services to local government and the community. Francis was made a Companion of the Queen's Service Order for public services in the 2002 Queen's Birthday and Golden Jubilee Honours. In the 2021 Queen's Birthday Honours, Francis was appointed a Companion of the New Zealand Order of Merit, for services to the community and conservation. At the 2024 New Zealander of the Year Awards, he was named Senior New Zealander of the Year.

== Later years ==
His wife, Eva, died in 2014. A biography of Francis, written by Gary Caffell, was published in 2015.
