= Cassandra Crowley =

New Zealand public servant

Cassandra Crowley (born 1979 or 1980) is a New Zealand public servant. She is a board member of Waka Kotahi, and was on the Taranaki District Health Board until it was merged into Te Whatu Ora, where she continued as a board member.

== Early life and education ==
Crowley was born and raised in Kaponga, rural Taranaki. There she went to St Patrick's School, and in New Plymouth she attended Sacred Heart Girls' College, and went on to study law and accountancy at Victoria University.

== Career ==
Crowley is a barrister solicitor and chartered accountant. She was head of compliance of the New Zealand Exchange and was chief executive of Local Government On-line in Wellington until she moved to Taranaki in 2014. She was general manager of Te Korowai o Ngāruahine Trust starting from April 2014 until she left in 2017. Part of her job there was helping Ngāruahine sell to the tourism industry. That year she was president of Chartered Accountants Australia and New Zealand for a year, the youngest person to do so. As of 2018 she was the commercial manager of Te Arawa Management Limited in the Bay of Plenty and she is a board member of Western Institute of Technology at Taranaki. In September 2019 Crowley became a board member of Waka Kotahi, in the Risk and Assurance Committee and the Investment and Delivery Committee.

In early 2020 Crowley became chair of the Taranaki District Health Board. She became chair of Te Whatu Ora (then Health New Zealand) when the district health boards were merged. Around early 2023, Crowley became an independent director of Silver Fern Farms. She has also been on the board of Wild for Taranaki Biodiversity Trust.

In 2017 she won a business scholarship award, which allowed her to study at the Columbia Business School in New York City. In 2018 Crowley won award for Inspirational Excellence in the Women in Governance Awards, an award for role models to women.

== Personal life ==
Crowley has a partner who lives in Wellington as of 2020.
