= Dot McKinnon =

New Zealand businessperson

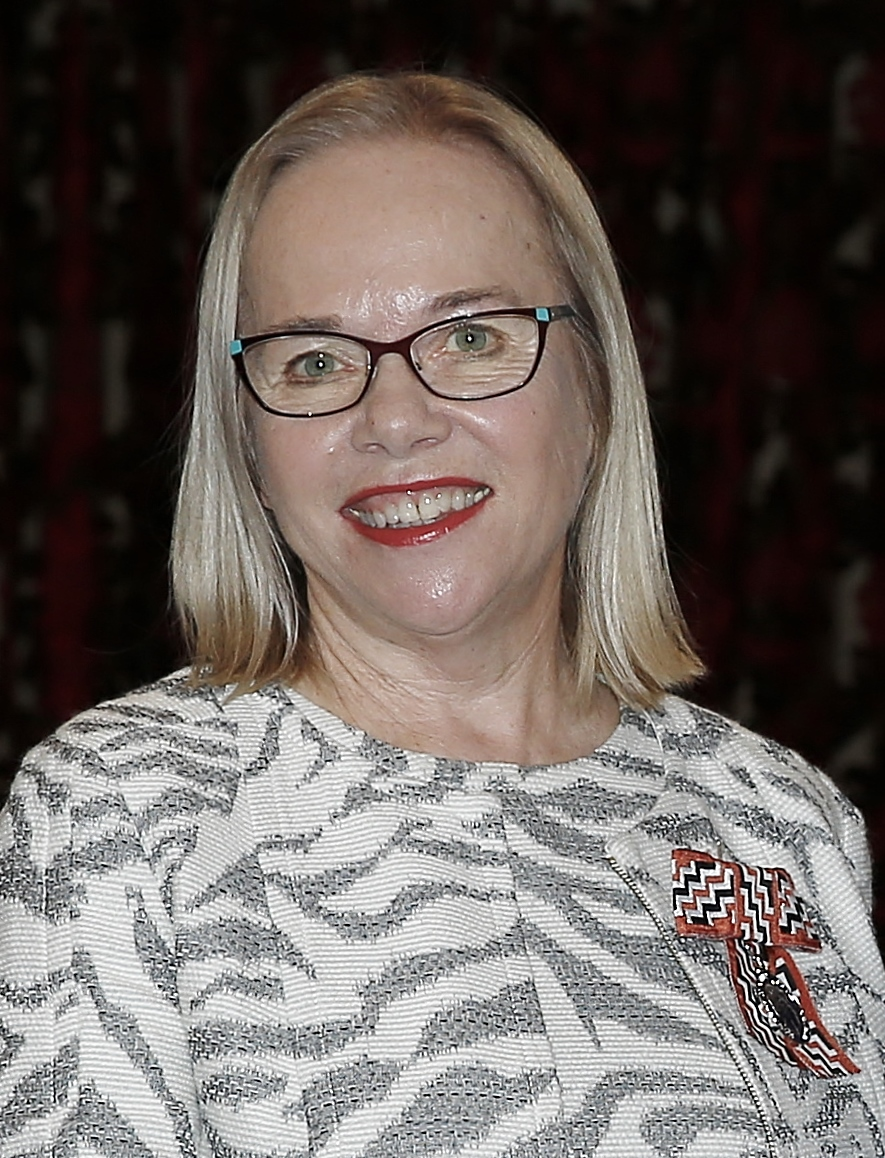
McKinnon in 2018

Dorothy Margaret McKinnon QSM is a New Zealand lawyer, local politician and former deputy mayor of Whanganui.

== Biography ==
McKinnon has served as the chair of the Whanganui District Health Board, chair of the MidCentral District Health Board and is a member of the Health Practitioners Disciplinary Tribunal.

McKinnon has also served as the chair of the New Zealand Masters Games, a trustee of Serjeant Gallery, a member of Whanganui Collegiate School Board of Trustees, and the Whanganui Community Foundation. She is also the director and chair of the Wellington Rotary District's International Service Committee.

=== Recognition ===
In the 2017 Queen's Birthday Honours, McKinnon received the Queen's Service Medal, for services to the community.
