= Wairarapa District Health Board =

District health board of New Zealand

- Location of the Wairarapa DHB (green) in New Zealand
- Formation: 1 January 2001; 25 years ago
- Founder: New Zealand Government
- Dissolved: 1 July 2022; 4 years ago
- Legal status: Active
- Purpose: DHB
- Services: Health and disability services
- Parent organization: Ministry of Health
- Website: www.wairarapa.dhb.org.nz

The Wairarapa District Health Board (Wairarapa DHB) was a district health board that provided healthcare to the Masterton, Carterton, and South Wairarapa districts of New Zealand. In July 2022, the Wairarapa DHB was merged into the national health service Te Whatu Ora (Health New Zealand).

== History ==
The Wairarapa District Health Board, like most other district health boards, came into effect on 1 January 2001 established by the New Zealand Public Health and Disability Act 2000.

The Wairarapa DHB was the last DHB in New Zealand to operate its own ambulance service. In March 2012, the ambulance service was outsourced to Wellington Free Ambulance.

On 1 July 2022, the Waikato DHB and the other 19 district health boards were disestablished, with Te Whatu Ora (Health New Zealand) assuming their former functions and operations including hospitals and health services. The Waikato DHB was brought under Te Whatu Ora's Te Manawa Taki division.

== Geographic area ==
The area covered by the Wairarapa District Health Board is defined in Schedule 1 of the New Zealand Public Health and Disability Act 2000 and based on territorial authority and ward boundaries as constituted as at 1 January 2001. The area can be adjusted through an Order in Council.

== Governance ==
The initial board was fully appointed. Since the 2001 local elections, the board has been partially elected (seven members) and in addition, up to four members get appointed by the Minister of Health. The minister also appoints the chairperson and deputy-chair from the pool of eleven board members.

=== Board chairs ===
Since its establishment in 2001, the Wairarapa District Health Board has had four chairs. The following is a complete list:

	Name	Term	Notes
1	Doug Matheson	2001–2006	
2	Bob Francis	2006–2013	
3	Derek Milne	2013–2016	
4	Paul Collins	2016–present	

== Demographics ==
Historical population
Year	Pop.	±% p.a.
2006	38,613	—
2013	41,112	+0.90%
2018	45,327	+1.97%

Wairarapa DHB served a population of 45,327 at the 2018 New Zealand census, an increase of 4,215 people (10.3%) since the 2013 census, and an increase of 6,714 people (17.4%) since the 2006 census. There were 17,913 households. There were 22,164 males and 23,163 females, giving a sex ratio of 0.96 males per female. The median age was 45.0 years (compared with 37.4 years nationally), with 8,628 people (19.0%) aged under 15 years, 6,966 (15.4%) aged 15 to 29, 19,995 (44.1%) aged 30 to 64, and 9,744 (21.5%) aged 65 or older.

Ethnicities were 87.5% European/Pākehā, 18.0% Māori, 3.1% Pacific peoples, 3.2% Asian, and 1.7% other ethnicities. People may identify with more than one ethnicity.

The percentage of people born overseas was 14.7, compared with 27.1% nationally.

Although some people objected to giving their religion, 52.1% had no religion, 36.2% were Christian, 0.5% were Hindu, 0.1% were Muslim, 0.5% were Buddhist and 2.8% had other religions.

Of those at least 15 years old, 6,441 (17.6%) people had a bachelor or higher degree, and 8,022 (21.9%) people had no formal qualifications. The median income was $29,200, compared with $31,800 nationally. 5,205 people (14.2%) earned over $70,000 compared to 17.2% nationally. The employment status of those at least 15 was that 17,151 (46.7%) people were employed full-time, 5,955 (16.2%) were part-time, and 1,179 (3.2%) were unemployed.

== Hospitals ==
=== Public hospitals ===
- Wairarapa Hospital (40.9475853°S 175.6723565°E) in Lansdowne, Masterton has 89 beds and provides surgical, medical, psychiatric, children's health and maternity services.

=== Private hospitals ===
- Selina Sutherland Hospital (40.9474935°S 175.6713245°E) in Lansdowne, Masterton has 10 beds and provides surgical services.
