= Lester Levy =

New Zealand business leader, full professor, and medical doctor

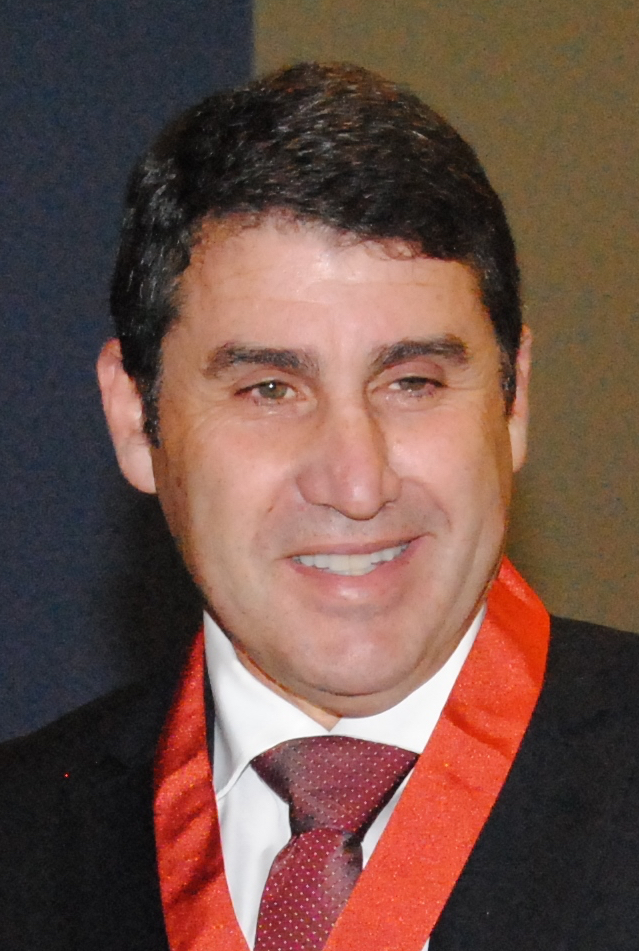
- Levy in 2013
- Born: 1954 (age 71–72); South Africa
- Education: University of the Witwatersrand, University of Auckland]
- Occupations: Medical doctor, professor
- Board member of: Health New Zealand

Lester Levy CNZM (born 1954) is a South African-born New Zealand business leader, professor, and medical doctor. Since 2019, he has been Professor of Digital Health Leadership at Auckland University of Technology.

Levy is a prominent figure in health governance in New Zealand. He was chair of the three Auckland region district health boards between 2009 and 2017. He commenced as chair of the Health New Zealand board in May 2024 and has been reappointed in that role until July 2026. He was the Health New Zealand commissioner from July 2024 to July 2025.

== Early life and education ==
Levy grew up in a small town near Sharpeville, South Africa. He was six years old when the Sharpeville massacre occurred. He claims the event formed many of his basic life philosophies, like wariness of authority, distrust of ideology, and not having a desire to fit in. His interest in New Zealand was raised when he did a project at school on Sir Edmund Hillary, whom he regards as a hero. He studied at the University of the Witwatersrand to become a medical doctor, and graduated Bachelor of Medicine, Bachelor of Surgery (MBBCh).

He moved to New Zealand in approximately 1978 and studied for a Master of Business Administration (MBA) at the University of Auckland.

== Career ==
Levy was chief executive of MercyAscot Hospital Group (a private hospital in Auckland), the South Auckland Crown Health Enterprise, and the New Zealand Blood Service. In 2003 he was made an adjunct professor at the University of Auckland Business School and the inaugural chief executive of the New Zealand Leadership Institute. Since 2019, he has been Professor of Digital Health Leadership at Auckland University of Technology.

Levy's governance roles have included chair of the environmental and engineering consultancy Tonkin + Taylor, Auckland Transport, and the Health Research Council of New Zealand. Between 2009 and 2017 he chaired all three district health boards in the Auckland region. His first appointment was at the Waitematā DHB from June 2009. The following year he was additionally appointed chair of the Auckland District Health Board. From December 2016, he was finally appointed chair of Counties Manukau District Health Board. He resigned from all roles in December 2017, saying that he had served his maximum period of service at Waitematā and that he felt all boards should be chaired be the same person. Around the same time, he was appointed to the Minister of Health's ministerial advisory group on the health system.

In May 2024 Levy was appointed to chair the board of Health New Zealand for a two-year term by Minister of Health Shane Reti, succeeding Dame Karen Poutasi. In July, the board was sacked and Levy was then appointed commissioner, with the aim of reducing overspend. He attracted criticism in September 2024 when he failed to produce documents requested by a select committee and it was revealed he was fulfilling his commissioner role while still teaching two days a week at Auckland University of Technology. During his time as commissioner, Levy's financial management of Health New Zealand was described as "cooking the books" when Health New Zealand revised its deficit for the 2023/24 financial year from nearly NZ$1 billion in October 2024 to NZ$722 million in its annual report on 3 December 2024. New health minister Simeon Brown reinstated the Health New Zealand board from July 2025 and reappointed Levy as the board chair for a twelve-month term.

== Recognition and personal life ==
In the 2013 New Year Honours, Levy was appointed a Companion of the New Zealand Order of Merit for services to health and education.

He moved to New Zealand in 1978, and is married with three children.
