= Auckland District Health Board =

District health board in the Auckland Region

- Te Toka Tumai
- Location of the Auckland DHB (green) in New Zealand
- Formation: 1 January 2001
- Dissolved: 1 July 2022; 4 years ago
- Purpose: District health board
- Chief Executive: Ailsa Claire
- Staff: 10,000 (2015)
- Website: www.adhb.health.nz

Auckland District Health Board (ADHB) was a district health board that provided healthcare in the Auckland Region in New Zealand, mainly on the Auckland isthmus. This district health board existed between 2001 and 2022 and was governed by a part-elected, part-appointed board. In 2022, its functions and responsibilities were subsumed by Te Whatu Ora (Health New Zealand) and Te Aka Whai Ora (Māori Health Authority).

== History ==
The Auckland District Health Board, like most other district health boards, came into effect on 1 January 2001 established by the New Zealand Public Health and Disability Act 2000.

On 1 July 2022, the Auckland DHB was disestablished and became part of Te Whatu Ora as part of a national overhaul of the district health board system. The Auckland DHB was revamped as Te Whatu Ora Te Toka Tumai Auckland. Te Whatu Ora Te Toka Tumai Auckland falls under the purview of Te Whatu Ora's Northern Division.

== Geographic area ==
The area covered by the Auckland District Health Board was defined in Schedule 1 of the New Zealand Public Health and Disability Act 2000 and based on territorial authority and ward boundaries as constituted on 1 January 2001. The area covered by the Auckland DHB was identical with that of the former Auckland City. The area could have been adjusted through an Order in Council.

== Facilities ==
The DHB controlled and ran many facilities within the Auckland Region including, but not limited to:

- Auckland Hospital
- Starship Children's Health
- Greenlane Clinical Centre
- Buchanan Rehabilitation Centre

== Governance ==
The initial board was fully appointed. Since the 2001 local elections, the board had been partially elected (seven members) and in addition, up to four members get appointed by the Minister of Health. The minister also appoints the chairperson and deputy-chair from the pool of eleven board members. Elections were held every three years as part of the country's local elections (Note: As per the Local Electoral Act 2001, elections must be held on the "second Saturday in October in every third year" from the date the Act came into effect in 2001.) As defined in the New Zealand Public Health and Disability Act 2000, persons elected or appointed "come into office on the 58th day after polling day", which thus always falls into December.

=== Chairpersons ===
Richard Waddel was the initial chairperson, appointed by Health Minister Annette King. In December 2001, Waddel was succeeded by Wayne Brown, who had since January 2001 been chairing Northland DHB and was now taking on Auckland and Tairāwhiti DHBs, i.e. chairing two boards in parallel. During the 2001–2004 local government term, Brown was forced to resign from Tairāwhiti DHB, where he had been elected, due to an administrative error by the Ministry of Health. The underlying legislation, the New Zealand Public Health and Disability Act 2000, did not allow a person elected to a district health board to also be a member of a second board, but this had been overlooked. Brown remained the appointed chair of the Auckland DHB. Brown was reappointed by King for another term in October 2004, but the new Health Minister, David Cunliffe, chose a new chair for Auckland from December 2007 when he appointed Patrick Snedden. The next Health Minister, Tony Ryall, replaced Brown in December 2010 with Lester Levy, and Levy was also put in charge of Waitemata DHB. Levy was reappointed in December 2013 by Ryall and in December 2016, the then Health Minister Jonathan Coleman appointed Levy to the third board in the Auckland region – Counties Manukau DHB. Levy had first been appointed to the Waitemata DHB as a member in June 2009 was to have reached the statutory limit of nine years in June 2018 and as it was his understanding that there should be one chairperson for all three DHBs in the Auckland region, he intended to resign his roles at that point. However, he had been appointed onto a Ministerial Advisory Group by Health Minister David Clark and to avoid the perception of a conflict of interest, he foreshadowed his resignation in December 2017 with effect in January 2018. Clarke reappointed Snedden as Auckland DHB chairperson from 1 June 2018 and confirmed him in the December 2019 reappointment round.

The following table gives a list of chairpersons of Auckland District Health Board:

Name	Portrait	Start	End	Source
Richard Waddel		January 2001	December 2001	
Wayne Brown		December 2001	December 2007	
Patrick Snedden		December 2007	December 2010	
Lester Levy		December 2010	January 2018	
Patrick Snedden		June 2018	2022	

=== First elected board (December 2001 – 2004) ===
Seven board members were elected in the October 2001 local elections. The elections were held at a ward-level and the first-past-the-post voting system (FPP) was used. Five of the successful seven elected members had an affiliation to a ticket. The Health Minister announced the appointment of the chairperson in mid-November 2001. It took until late December before the remaining three appointments were announced; the minister's appointment for deputy chair was given to one of the elected members.

Member(s)	Ward / appointed	Affiliation (notes)
Wayne Brown (chair)	appointed	n/a
Margaret Horsburgh (deputy chair)	Northeast	
John Retimana	appointed	n/a
Vicki Salmon	appointed	n/a
Rees Tapsell	appointed	n/a
Crystal Beavis	South	Citizens & Ratepayers Now
Susan Devoy	South	Citizens & Ratepayers Now
Charles Lowndes	Northeast	Citizens & Ratepayers Now
Di Nash	Northwest and Gulf	
Ian Scott	South	Peoples Health First
Patrick Snedden	Northwest and Gulf	Peoples Health First

=== Fifth board (2013–2016) ===
The following members were elected or appointed to the board:

Member(s)	Elected / appointed
Lester Levy	appointed
Jo Agnew	elected
Peter Aitken	elected
Douglas Armstrong	elected
Judith Bassett	elected
Chris Chambers	elected
Lee Mathias	appointed
Robyn Northey	elected
Morris Pita	appointed
Gwen Tepania‐Palmer	appointed
Ian Ward	appointed

=== Final board (2019–2022) ===
The following members serve on the current board:

Member(s)	Elected / appointed	Affiliation (if any)
Patrick Snedden (chair)	appointed	n/a
Gwen Tepania-Palmer (deputy chair)	appointed	n/a
Sharon Shea	appointed	n/a
Jo Agnew	elected	City Vision Health
Peter Davis	elected	City Vision Health
Michelle Atkinson	elected	City Vision Health
Zoe Brownlie	elected	Independent
Douglas Armstrong	elected	World Class Health Auckland
Fiona Lai	elected	C&R
Troy Elliot	elected	C&R

== Demographics ==
Historical population
Year	Pop.	±% p.a.
2006	404,619	—
2013	436,344	+1.08%
2018	467,604	+1.39%

Auckland DHB served a population of 467,604 at the 2018 New Zealand census, an increase of 31,260 people (7.2%) since the 2013 census, and an increase of 62,985 people (15.6%) since the 2006 census. There were 159,009 households. There were 231,525 males and 236,076 females, giving a sex ratio of 0.98 males per female. The median age was 34.1 years (compared with 37.4 years nationally), with 78,504 people (16.8%) aged under 15 years, 120,780 (25.8%) aged 15 to 29, 214,935 (46.0%) aged 30 to 64, and 53,382 (11.4%) aged 65 or older.

Ethnicities were 53.5% European/Pākehā, 8.2% Māori, 12.5% Pacific peoples, 32.1% Asian, and 4.1% other ethnicities. People may identify with more than one ethnicity.

The percentage of people born overseas was 44.3, compared with 27.1% nationally.

Although some people objected to giving their religion, 43.6% had no religion, 36.1% were Christian, 6.5% were Hindu, 3.3% were Muslim, 2.3% were Buddhist and 3.2% had other religions.

Of those at least 15 years old, 149,832 (38.5%) people had a bachelor or higher degree, and 38,133 (9.8%) people had no formal qualifications. The median income was $36,500, compared with $31,800 nationally. 90,609 people (23.3%) earned over $70,000 compared to 17.2% nationally. The employment status of those at least 15 was that 205,284 (52.8%) people were employed full-time, 55,251 (14.2%) were part-time, and 15,657 (4.0%) were unemployed.

== Hospitals ==
=== Grafton ===
- Auckland City Hospital and Starship Hospital (36.8595518°S 174.7681969°E) in Grafton are public hospitals, with 1124 beds, which provides children's health, maternity, surgical, medical services.
- The Auckland DHB Mental Health Unit, also headquartered in Grafton (36.8597908°S 174.7563999°E), has 96 beds, which provides mental health services.

=== Epsom ===
- Greenlane Clinical Centre (36.8945102°S 174.777252°E) is a public hospital with 31 beds, which provides surgical and medical services.
- Allevia Hospital Epsom (formerly Mercy Integrated Hospital) (36.8733362°S 174.7677773°E) is a private hospital with 118 beds, which provides surgical and medical services.
- Southern Cross Hospital Brightside (36.8791008°S 174.7687274°E) is a private hospital with 43 beds, which provides surgical and medical services.
- Gillies Hospital (36.8813516°S 174.7700862°E) is a private hospital with 16 beds, which provides surgical and medical services.
- Endoscopy Auckland (36.880127°S 174.7703851°E) is a private hospital with 10 beds, which provides surgical services.

=== Remuera ===
- Allevia Hospital Ascot (formerly Ascot Integrated Hospital) 36.8804212°S 174.7681189°E() is a private hospital with 86 beds, which provides surgical and medical services.
- Southern Cross Auckland Surgical Centre (36.8739242°S 174.777725°E) is a private hospital with 17 beds, which provides surgical services.
- St Marks Road Surgical Centre (36.8735538°S 174.7782106°E) is a private hospital with four beds, which provides surgical services.
- Remuera Surgical Care (36.8738338°S 174.7817034°E) is a private hospital with four beds, which provides surgical services.

=== Pt Chevelier ===
- Mason Clinic (36.8750972°S 174.704138°E) is a public mental health hospital with 109 beds.
- Buchanan Rehabilitation Centre (36.8727748°S 174.7101118°E) is a public mental health hospital with 40 beds.
- Pitman House (36.8736399°S 174.7082434°E) is a public mental health hospital with 10 beds.

=== Other ===
- Birthcare Auckland (36.8622277°S 174.7775124°E) in Parnell is a private hospital with 45 beds, which provides maternity services.
- Mercy Hospice (36.8672665°S 174.7812352°E) in Freemans Bay is a private hospital with 13 beds, which provides medical services.
- Quay Park Surgical (36.847517°S 174.7722983°E) in Auckland CBD is a private hospital with four beds, which provides surgical services.
