= Kay McKelvie =

New Zealand chairwoman

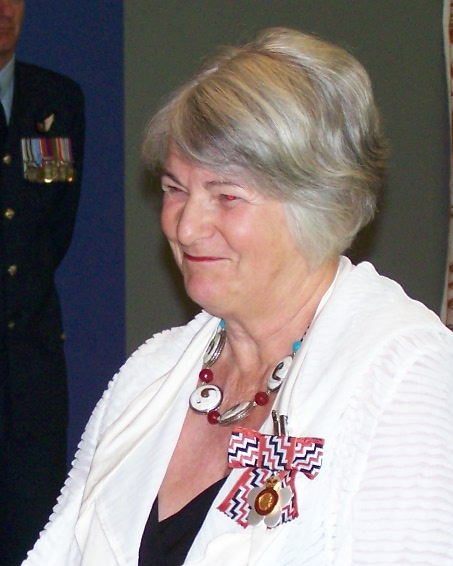
McKelvie in 2006

Kay Therese McKelvie QSO is a New Zealand chairwoman. She was previously chair of the Waitematā District Health Board and Tourism New Zealand.

== Career ==
At the 1998 local elections she stood for a seat on the Auckland City Council in the Balmoral ward as a City Vision candidate and was elected.

McKelvie was chairwoman of the Waitemata District Health Board starting from 2001 until 2009. She was appointed by Labour MP Annette King, and resigned in 2009, citing a lack of funding to the board from the National government. It was funded $1.074 billion, which she predicted would result in a $35 million deficit as a result of it not "tak[ing] into account the increase in population in the Waitemata district".

In 2007, McKelvie was appointed a director of the Crown Health Financing Agency for a three-year term. That year she was also appointed a member of the New Zealand Tourism Board for two years. As of 2008, she is also chairwoman of Quotable Value, the Housing New Zealand Appeal Authority, a member of the National Capital Committee and Ministry of Health, and a director of Word Pictures Ltd.

In the 2009 New Year Honours McKelvie was named a companion of the Queen's Service Order for services to business and health.
