= John Anderson (New Zealand businessman, born 1945) =

New Zealand businessman and executive (1945–2018)

Sir John Anthony Anderson KBE (2 August 1945 – 13 November 2018) was a New Zealand businessman and sports administrator. He was Chief Executive and Director of ANZ Bank New Zealand (then ANZ National Bank Ltd) and after retiring at the end of 2005, became the chair of Television New Zealand in April 2006.

== Early life and family ==
Anderson was born in Wellington, and was educated at Christ's College and Victoria University of Wellington. He married Carol Tuck in 1970, and they had three children.

== Business career ==
He began his career in accounting, followed by sharebroking in Melbourne. He returned to New Zealand in 1972 to help form the merchant bank South Pacific Merchant Finance (Southpac). He became Chief Executive of Southpac in 1979 and within a year of Southpac merging with the National Bank of New Zealand in 1988, he became Chief Executive of the National Bank. Anderson oversaw the National Bank's merger with Rural Bank in 1992 and Countrywide Bank in 1998. In 2004 Lloyds TSB sold The National Bank to the ANZ bank. After ANZ's acquisition of the National Bank he was responsible for ANZ's New Zealand businesses until his retirement at the end of 2005.

Anderson was on a number of business boards in the 1980s, including New Zealand Steel and Petrocorp, where he was Chairman. He was on the international board of the World Wide Fund for Nature for four years as well as being the New Zealand Chairman. He was also a member of the Prime Minister's Enterprise Council from 1990 to 1999.

In December 2007 he was appointed by the New Zealand government to be the chairman of the Capital and Coast District Health Board, responsible for medical services in the Wellington and Kapiti Coast, after a series of significant financial and operational problems. In February 2008 he was appointed commissioner of the Hawke's Bay District Health Board after Health Minister, David Cunliffe, sacked the DHB board due to the minister's dissatisfaction with their running of the DHB. After the change of government following the 2008 general election, the new Health Minister, Tony Ryall, reinstated the board of Hawke's Bay DHB that had been elected in 2007 and appointed Anderson as the board's chairman. At the next regular round of DHB appointments in November 2010, Ryall did not reappoint Anderson at either Hawke's Bay or Capital and Coast DHBs.

In 2010 Anderson joined the board of PGG Wrightson and became chairman.

== Sports administration ==
Anderson was appointed chairman of New Zealand Cricket in 1995, and was New Zealand's representative on the International Cricket Council Executive Board.

== Death ==
Anderson died in Wellington of health complications on 13 November 2018.

== Honours and awards ==
Anderson was awarded the New Zealand 1990 Commemoration Medal, and in the 1995 New Year Honours, he was appointed a Knight Commander of the Order of the British Empire, for services to business management, banking and the community. In 2005, he was the inaugural winner of the Blake Medal for demonstrated leadership in many fields – business, sport, environment and the community. He was inducted into the New Zealand Business Hall of Fame in 2013.

Awards
| Preceded by Susie Simcock | Leadership Award; 2009 | Succeeded by Jock Hobbs |
