= Paul Collins (businessman) =

New Zealand businessman (born 1953)

Sir Paul Collins KNZM
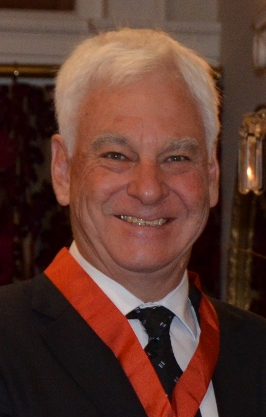
- Collins in 2015
- Born: Paul David Collins; 27 February 1953 (age 73); Wellington, New Zealand
- Occupation: Businessman

Sir Paul David Collins KNZM (born 27 February 1953) is a New Zealand businessman and sports administrator.

Collins was born in Wellington in 1953. He has family ties to Martinborough and has lived there since the early 2000s. He was chief executive of Brierley Investments between 1985 and 1998, and was active on the boards of several sporting bodies. He served as a governor of the New Zealand Sports Foundation from 1986, and was chair of the organisation from 1992 to 1999. He later chaired Sport New Zealand, formed by the merger of the Sports Foundation and the Hillary Commission. Collins was an inaugural trustee of Wellington Regional Stadium Trust from 1994, and chaired the trust between 2000 and 2012. He was also a member of the board of the Wellington Rugby Football Union and a director of the Hurricanes franchise. Collins was a member of the committee that secured New Zealand's hosting of the 2011 Rugby World Cup. Collins was a director of construction company Mainzeal when it went into receivership in February 2013.

In the 2015 New Year Honours, Collins was appointed a Knight Companion of the New Zealand Order of Merit, for services to sports governance.

Collins was appointed to the Wairarapa District Health Board as chairman by the Minister of Health, Jonathan Coleman, in December 2016. Three years later, he was reappointed by Health Minister David Clark.

In 2019 Collins was appointed to the Trust Board of the Malaghan Institute of Medical Research, of which his father, Wellington surgeon Tom Collins, was a founding trustee. He was made Chair of the Malaghan Institute in December 2023 following the retirement of Graham Malaghan.
