= Lynette Stewart =

New Zealand healthcare administrator (born 1943 or 1944)

Lynette Merle Stewart CNZM (née Peters, born 1943 or 1944) is a New Zealand executive specialising in governance of health organisations.

== Biography ==
Stewart was born in Whangārei and grew up in Whananaki. Her siblings include politician Winston Peters, Northland Regional Councillor Jim Peters and Northland Rugby Union chairman Wayne Peters. She is Māori, of Ngātiwai, Patuharakeke, and Tainui iwi. She earned a master's degree from the University of Auckland with a thesis examining the significance of Māori health providers within the New Zealand health system.

She was chair of the Northland District Health Board from 2001 to 2009. She then went on to serve as head of Kia Ora Ngati Wai Health Trust. Stewart has also served as a member of the National Health Committee, the Public Health Advisory Committee and the Health Workforce Advisory Committee. She was a member of the ACC Review Committee, the Treaty of Waitangi Public Information Advisory Programme Board, the Maori Rural Training Consortium and is a past president of the New Zealand Association of Social Workers.

== Honours and awards ==
In 2003, Stewart received the Dame Mira Szazy Maori Business Leadership Award from the University of Auckland Business School. In the 2006 Queen's Birthday Honours, she was appointed a Companion of the New Zealand Order of Merit, for services to health administration. In 2008 she received the Distinguished Alumni Award from the University of Auckland.
