= Northland District Health Board =

District health board of New Zealand

- Location of the Northland DHB (green) in New Zealand
- Abbreviation: NDHB
- Formation: 1 January 2001; 25 years ago
- Founder: New Zealand Government
- Dissolved: 1 July 2022; 4 years ago
- Legal status: Active
- Purpose: DHB
- Services: Health and disability services
- Parent organization: Ministry of Health
- Website: www.northlanddhb.org.nz

The Northland District Health Board (Northland DHB or NDHB) was a district health board with the focus on providing healthcare to the Northland Region of New Zealand. In July 2022, the Northland DHB was merged into the national health service Te Whatu Ora (Health New Zealand).

== History ==
The Northland District Health Board, like most other district health boards, came into effect on 1 January 2001 established by the New Zealand Public Health and Disability Act 2000.

A new two-storey building at Bay of Islands Hospital in Kawakawa opened in December 2018. It has a radiology, accident and medical facility services with four acute bays, two resuscitation bays, two consulting and triage rooms, and a procedure, isolation and paediatric room, increasing capacity from three to seven beds. It also has a general ward, increasing total beds from 15 to 20.

By June 2019, an extension to the Dargaville inpatient mental health detoxification service extension had been completed, increasing bed numbers from five to eight.

On 1 July 2022, the Northland DHB and the other district health boards were disestablished, with Te Whatu Ora (Health New Zealand) assuming their former functions and operations including hospitals and health services. The Northland DHB was brought under Te Whatu Ora's Northern division.

== Geographic area ==
The board serves the Far North District, Whangarei District and Kaipara District (which equates to the Northland Region), as defined in Schedule 1 of the New Zealand Public Health and Disability Act 2000 and based on territorial authority and ward boundaries as constituted as at 1 January 2001. The area can be adjusted through an Order in Council.

== Governance ==
The initial board was fully appointed. Since the 2001 local elections, the board has been partially elected (seven members) and in addition, up to four members get appointed by the Minister of Health. The minister also appoints the chairperson and deputy-chair from the pool of eleven board members. The inaugural chairperson, Wayne Brown, was concurrently chairperson of the Tairāwhiti DHB. Following the first elections in October 2001, Lynette Stewart was appointed as chairperson. Stewart was replaced by Tony Norman from 1 January 2010. After one term, Norman was replaced by Sally Macauley in December 2016. Macauley also served one term and was replaced by Harry Burkhardt in December 2019.

=== Chairpersons ===
The following table gives a list of chairpersons of Northland District Health Board:

Name	Portrait	Start	End	Source
Wayne Brown		January 2001	November 2001	
Lynette Stewart		December 2001	December 2009	
Tony Norman		January 2010	December 2016	
Sally Macauley		December 2016	December 2019	
Harry Burkhardt		December 2019	30th June 2022	

== Hospitals ==
=== Public hospitals ===
Northland District Health Board operates five public hospitals:

- Bay of Islands Hospital (35.385517°S 174.069241°E) in Kawakawa in the Far North District has 20 beds, providing medical, maternity, surgical and children's health services.
- Dargaville Hospital (35.928944°S 173.875109°E) in Dargaville in the Kaipara District has 19 beds, and provides mental health, maternity, medical, children's health and surgical services.
- Kaitaia Hospital (35.119262°S 173.260981°E) in Kaitaia in the Far North District has 32 beds, and provides mental health, surgical, children's health, maternity and medical services.
- Timatanga Hou Detox Unit (35.930620°S 173.871132°E) is a mental health unit with eight beds based at Dargaville Hospital.
- Whangārei Hospital (35.736333°S 174.303447°E) in Woodhill in Whangārei has 316 beds, and provides mental health, maternity, medical, psychiatric, children's health and surgical services.

=== Private hospitals ===
Two private hospitals are located in the Northland District Health Board area:

- Kensington Hospital (35.708324°S 174.320103°E) in Kensington in Whangārei has 19 beds and provides surgical services.
- North Haven Hospice (35.694876°S 174.332472°E) in Tikipunga in Whangarei has eight beds and provides medical services.
