= Kim Ngārimu =

New Zealand business executive

Kim Ngārimu is a New Zealand business executive. In public service roles she has worked at Te Puni Kōkiri and the Ministry for Women. She was appointed to the Waitangi Tribunal in 2018. In 2023 she was a council member of the Medical Council of New Zealand and was also appointed to the board of Te Aka Whai Ora (the Māori Health Authority).

== About ==
Ngārimu is affiliated to the Māori iwi Ngāti Porou and Te Aitanga ā Mate, and is based in the Gisborne region on the East Coast of New Zealand.

== Career ==
Ngārimu started a public service career in the early 1990s and was at Te Puni Kōkiri, (the Ministry of Māori Development) a New Zealand Government ministry for Māori wellbeing and development. She left in 1999, and worked in the office of the Auditor-General.

In 2004 she was acting director of the Waitangi Tribunal.

Between 2007 and 2013, she held the position of deputy secretary policy at Te Puni Kōkiri, and in 2012 she served as acting chief executive of the Ministry of Women.

Ngārimu is deputy chair of Te Kaunihera Rata o Aotearoa Medical Council of New Zealand.

In 2023 she was appointed along with Ben Dalton and Helmut Modlik as a new member of the Board of Te Aka Whai Ora, the Māori Health Authority. Ngārimu was appointed to the three-year term role of deputy chair. Associate Minister of Health Peeni Henare described her as an "influencer with proven capability in stakeholder engagement.”

Ngārimu is a member of the Waitangi Tribunal and is the Director of the business Tāua Limited that consults in public policy. As of 2023 she was on the Council of Te Pūkenga, the national vocational training organisation established by the government in 2020. The members of the council are appointed in accordance with the Education and Training Act. In the past she had been a board member of the Eastern Institute of Technology (EIT).

Roles held also include:

- Chair of Hauora Tairāwhiti, Tairāwhiti District Health Board
- Deputy Chair of the IST Establishment Board
- Board member of Northtec Ltd
- Board member of Heritage New Zealand
- Board member of the Māori Heritage Council
- Board member of Te Māngai Pāhō
