= Whanganui District Health Board =

District health board of New Zealand

- Location of the Whanganui DHB (green) in New Zealand
- Abbreviation: WDHB
- Formation: 1 January 2001; 25 years ago
- Founder: New Zealand Government
- Dissolved: 1 July 2022; 4 years ago
- Legal status: Active
- Purpose: DHB
- Services: Health and disability services
- Parent organization: Ministry of Health
- Website: www.wdhb.org.nz

The Whanganui District Health Board (Whanganui DHB or WDHB) was a district health board that provided healthcare to the Wanganui, Rangitikei, and parts of the Ruapehu districts of New Zealand. In July 2022, it was merged into the national health service Te Whatu Ora (Health New Zealand).

== History ==
The Whanganui District Health Board, like most other district health boards, came into effect on 1 January 2001 established by the New Zealand Public Health and Disability Act 2000.

On 1 July 2022, the Whanganui DHB and the other 19 district health boards were disestablished, with Te Whatu Ora (Health New Zealand) assuming their former functions and operations including hospitals and health services. The Waikato DHB was brought under Te Whatu Ora's Central division.

== Geographic area ==
The area covered by the Whanganui District Health Board was defined in Schedule 1 of the New Zealand Public Health and Disability Act 2000 and based on territorial authority and ward boundaries as constituted as at 1 January 2001. The area could have been adjusted through an Order in Council.

== Governance ==
The initial board was fully appointed. Since the 2001 local elections, the board had been partially elected (seven members) and in addition, up to four members get appointed by the Minister of Health. The minister also appoints the chairperson and deputy-chair from the pool of eleven board members.

== Demographics ==
Historical population
Year	Pop.	±% p.a.
2006	62,211	—
2013	60,120	−0.49%
2018	64,599	+1.45%

Whanganui DHB served a population of 64,599 at the 2018 New Zealand census, an increase of 4,479 people (7.5%) since the 2013 census, and an increase of 2,388 people (3.8%) since the 2006 census. There were 25,281 households. There were 31,731 males and 32,871 females, giving a sex ratio of 0.97 males per female. The median age was 42.1 years (compared with 37.4 years nationally), with 13,068 people (20.2%) aged under 15 years, 11,142 (17.2%) aged 15 to 29, 27,807 (43.0%) aged 30 to 64, and 12,579 (19.5%) aged 65 or older.

Ethnicities were 78.5% European/Pākehā, 27.4% Māori, 4.0% Pacific peoples, 3.7% Asian, and 1.7% other ethnicities. People may identify with more than one ethnicity.

The percentage of people born overseas was 12.2, compared with 27.1% nationally.

Although some people objected to giving their religion, 48.0% had no religion, 37.1% were Christian, 0.6% were Hindu, 0.2% were Muslim, 0.4% were Buddhist and 5.6% had other religions.

Of those at least 15 years old, 6,918 (13.4%) people had a bachelor or higher degree, and 12,087 (23.5%) people had no formal qualifications. The median income was $25,100, compared with $31,800 nationally. 4,983 people (9.7%) earned over $70,000 compared to 17.2% nationally. The employment status of those at least 15 was that 22,812 (44.3%) people were employed full-time, 7,788 (15.1%) were part-time, and 2,412 (4.7%) were unemployed.

== Hospitals ==
=== Public hospitals ===
- Whanganui Hospital (39.943912°S 175.037783°E) in Gonville, Whanganui has 172 beds and provides children's health, maternity, surgical, medical, geriatric and mental health services.

=== Private hospitals ===
- Taihape Health (39.6812348°S 175.7956642°E) in Taihape, Rangitikei District has two beds and provides maternity services.
- Belverdale Hospital (39.9296639°S 175.0504435°E) in Whanganui Central, Whanganui has 15 beds and provides surgical services.
- Hospice Wanganui (39.906900°S 175.026259°E) in Otamatea, Whanganui has five beds and provides medical services.
