= Lakes District Health Board =

District health board of New Zealand

- Location of the Lakes DHB (green) in New Zealand
- Formation: 1 January 2001; 25 years ago
- Founder: New Zealand Government
- Dissolved: 1 July 2022; 4 years ago
- Legal status: Active
- Purpose: DHB
- Services: Health and disability services
- Parent organization: Ministry of Health
- Website: www.lakesdhb.govt.nz

The Lakes District Health Board (Lakes DHB) was a district health board that provided healthcare to the area covered by Taupō and Rotorua districts in New Zealand. In July 2022, the Lakes DHB was merged into the national health service Te Whatu Ora (Health New Zealand).

== History ==
The Lakes District Health Board, like most other district health boards, came into effect on 1 January 2001 established by the New Zealand Public Health and Disability Act 2000.

On 1 July 2022, the Lakes DHB and the other district health boards were disestablished, with Te Whatu Ora (Health New Zealand) assuming their former functions and operations including hospitals and health services. The Lakes DHB's functions and operations were subsumed into Te Whatu Ora's Te Manawa Taki division.

== Geographic area ==
The area covered by the Lakes District Health Board is defined in Schedule 1 of the New Zealand Public Health and Disability Act 2000 and based on territorial authority and ward boundaries as constituted as at 1 January 2001. The area can be adjusted through an Order in Council.

== Governance ==
The initial board was fully appointed. Since the 2001 local elections, the board has been partially elected (seven members) and in addition, up to four members get appointed by the Minister of Health. The minister also appoints the chairperson and deputy-chair from the pool of eleven board members.

== Demographics ==
Historical population
Year	Pop.	±% p.a.
2006	98,319	—
2013	98,190	−0.02%
2018	109,080	+2.13%

Lakes DHB served a population of 109,080 at the 2018 New Zealand census, an increase of 10,890 people (11.1%) since the 2013 census, and an increase of 10,761 people (10.9%) since the 2006 census. There were 38,886 households. There were 53,670 males and 55,407 females, giving a sex ratio of 0.97 males per female. The median age was 38.1 years (compared with 37.4 years nationally), with 23,766 people (21.8%) aged under 15 years, 20,220 (18.5%) aged 15 to 29, 47,655 (43.7%) aged 30 to 64, and 17,439 (16.0%) aged 65 or older.

Ethnicities were 67.8% European/Pākehā, 36.6% Māori, 4.7% Pacific peoples, 7.9% Asian, and 1.7% other ethnicities. People may identify with more than one ethnicity.

The percentage of people born overseas was 17.4, compared with 27.1% nationally.

Although some people objected to giving their religion, 50.6% had no religion, 34.3% were Christian, 1.5% were Hindu, 0.3% were Muslim, 0.5% were Buddhist and 6.0% had other religions.

Of those at least 15 years old, 14,238 (16.7%) people had a bachelor or higher degree, and 16,194 (19.0%) people had no formal qualifications. The median income was $28,800, compared with $31,800 nationally. 11,406 people (13.4%) earned over $70,000 compared to 17.2% nationally. The employment status of those at least 15 was that 41,505 (48.6%) people were employed full-time, 13,392 (15.7%) were part-time, and 4,353 (5.1%) were unemployed.

== Hospitals ==
=== Public hospitals ===
- Rotorua Hospital (38.1312696°S 176.2476261°E) in Ohinemutu, Rotorua, Rotorua Lakes has 233 beds and provides children's health, maternity, surgical, medical, geriatric and mental health services.
- Taupo Hospital (38.699116°S 176.099557°E) in Hilltop, Taupō, Taupō District has 36 beds and provides surgical, medical and maternity services.

=== Private hospitals ===
- Southern Cross Hospital Rotorua (38.158313°S 176.239251°E) in Springfield, Rotorua, Rotorua Lakes has 17 beds and provides medical and surgical services.
