= Capital and Coast District Health Board =

District health board in Wellington, New Zealand

- Ūpoko ki te Uru Hauora

- Location of the Capital and Coast DHB (green) in New Zealand
- Formation: 1 January 2001
- Dissolved: 1 July 2022; 4 years ago
- Purpose: District health board
- Chief executive: Fionnagh Dougan
- Chair: David Smol
- Deputy chair: Stacey Shortall
- Staff: 5,800 (Unknown)
- Website: www.ccdhb.org.nz

The Capital and Coast District Health Board (CCDHB) was a district health board with the focus on providing healthcare to Wellington, Porirua and the Kāpiti Coast in New Zealand. The CCDHB employed about 6000 people across the Wellington Region. It was disestablished on 1 July 2022, with its functions and responsibilities being taken over by the national health service Te Whatu Ora (Health New Zealand).

== History ==
The Capital and Coast District Health Board, like most other district health boards, came into effect on 1 January 2001 established by the New Zealand Public Health and Disability Act 2000.

On 1 July 2022, the Capital and Coast DHB was abolished when the Pae Ora (Healthy Futures) Act 2022 came into effect. It was merged into the newly created national health service Te Whatu Ora (Health New Zealand). Under Te Whatu Ora, a successor entity operates as the "Capital, Coast, and Hutt Valley District," which is part of the organisation's Central division.

== Geographic area ==
The area covered by the Capital and Coast District Health Board is defined in Schedule 1 of the New Zealand Public Health and Disability Act 2000 and based on territorial authority and ward boundaries as constituted as at 1 January 2001. The area can be adjusted through an Order in Council.

== Facilities ==
The Wellington Regional Hospital in Newtown is the largest of the CCDHB's facilities, serving the Wellington Region and the northern South Island. Other facilities include the Wellington Children's Hospital, the Kenepuru Community Hospital in Porirua and the Kapiti Health Centre.

== Governance ==
The initial board was fully appointed. Since the 2001 local elections, the board has been partially elected (seven members) and in addition, up to four members get appointed by the Minister of Health. The minister also appoints the chairperson and deputy-chair from the pool of eleven board members.

== Demographics ==
Historical population
Year	Pop.	±% p.a.
2006	266,661	—
2013	283,707	+0.89%
2018	303,987	+1.39%

Capital and Coast DHB served a population of 303,987 at the 2018 New Zealand census, an increase of 20,280 people (7.1%) since the 2013 census, and an increase of 37,326 people (14.0%) since the 2006 census. There were 110,802 households. There were 147,432 males and 156,552 females, giving a sex ratio of 0.94 males per female. The median age was 35.9 years (compared with 37.4 years nationally), with 53,937 people (17.7%) aged under 15 years, 72,198 (23.8%) aged 15 to 29, 138,153 (45.4%) aged 30 to 64, and 39,699 (13.1%) aged 65 or older.

Ethnicities were 74.1% European/Pākehā, 11.6% Māori, 8.7% Pacific peoples, 14.5% Asian, and 3.8% other ethnicities. People may identify with more than one ethnicity.

The percentage of people born overseas was 30.4, compared with 27.1% nationally.

Although some people objected to giving their religion, 51.4% had no religion, 34.3% were Christian, 2.8% were Hindu, 1.3% were Muslim, 1.4% were Buddhist and 3.1% had other religions.

Of those at least 15 years old, 93,435 (37.4%) people had a bachelor or higher degree, and 25,650 (10.3%) people had no formal qualifications. The median income was $38,400, compared with $31,800 nationally. 64,548 people (25.8%) earned over $70,000 compared to 17.2% nationally. The employment status of those at least 15 was that 134,694 (53.9%) people were employed full-time, 35,751 (14.3%) were part-time, and 11,379 (4.6%) were unemployed.

=== Last board (2019–2022) ===
Elections were held in October 2019 and seven members were elected, with an additional four members appointed by the Minister of Health. Ayesha Verrall was one of the elected members but she resigned when she was elected to parliament the following year.

Member(s)	Affiliation (if any)
Sue Kedgley	Green
David Smol	None (appointed; chairperson)
Chris Kalderimis	Independent
Kathryn Adams	Independent
Roger Blakeley	Independent
'Ana Coffey	Independent
Vanessa Simpson	Independent
Hamiora Bowkett	None (appointed)
Tristram Ingham	None (appointed)
Stacey Shortall	None (appointed)
Brendan Boyle	None (appointed)

== Hospitals ==
=== Wellington Hospital campus ===
- Wellington Regional Hospital (41.3085872°S 174.778601°E) in Newtown, Wellington is the DHB's main public hospital, with 484 beds and provides children's health, maternity, surgical and medical services.
- Wellington Hospital Mental Health Services is an on-campus public mental health facility with 29 beds.
- Mary Potter Hospice (41.1102528°S 174.5924245°E) is a private hospice with 22 beds, which provides medical services.

=== Kenepuru Community Hospital campus ===
- Kenepuru Community Hospital (41.1467893°S 174.8323305°E) in Kenepuru, Porirua, is a public hospital with 131 beds, which provides maternity, medical, mental health, surgical and psychogeriatric services.
- Porirua Hospital Campus Mental Health Services is an on-campus public mental health facility with 18 beds.

=== Other hospitals ===
- Wakefield Hospital (41.3167973°S 174.7771576°E) in Newtown, Wellington, is a private hospital with 71 beds, which provides medical and surgical services.
- Bowen Hospital (41.2595287°S 174.764309°E) in Crofton Downs, Wellington, is a private hospital with 44 beds, which provides surgical and medical services.
- Southern Cross Hospital Wellington (41.3094629°S 174.7732074°E) in Newtown, Wellington is a private hospital with 37 beds, which provides surgical services.
- Kapiti Health Centre (40.9103178°S 175.0052207°E) in Paraparaumu, Kāpiti Coast is a public maternity hospital with two beds.
