= Sally Morrison =

Sally Morrison may refer to:

- Sally Morrison (writer)
- Sally Morrison (philanthropist)
