= Tony Lanigan =

New Zealand civil engineer (1947–2024)

Tony Lanigan MNZM
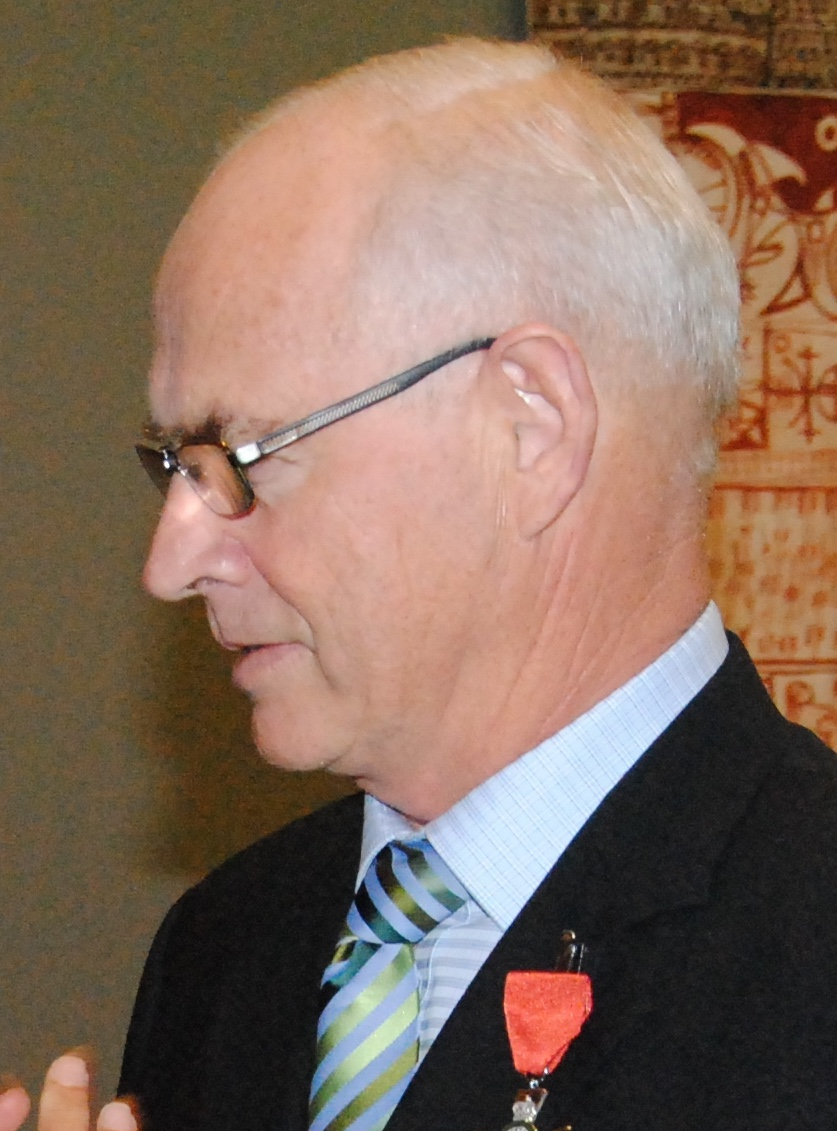
- Lanigan in 2013

1st Chancellor of Auckland University of Technology
- In office 2000–2001
- Succeeded by: Wyn Hoadley

Personal details
- Born: Anthony Gerard Lanigan; 24 March 1948
- Died: 24 October 2024 (aged 76) Auckland, New Zealand
- Education: University of Auckland
- Profession: Civil engineer

Anthony Gerard Lanigan MNZM (24 March 1948 – 24 October 2024) was a New Zealand civil engineer. He was the first chancellor of Auckland University of Technology from 2000 to 2001, and a founding director in New Zealand of the international charity, Habitat for Humanity.

== Background ==
Lanigan was born on 24 March 1948, and spent his childhood in Auckland. He came from a strong Catholic family, in Northcote, and was educated at St Peter's College, where he was joint proxime accessit in 1965. He went on to study at the University of Auckland, from where he graduated with Bachelor of Engineering degree with first-class honours in civil engineering in 1970 and a PhD degree in 1974. His research into the prediction of thermal stress conditions in box girder bridges stemmed from post construction problems with the Newmarket Viaduct. His research yielded a design approach for accommodating solar-induced thermal loads on civil engineering structures. Lanigan had a strong social justice ethos from his student days at the University of Auckland, where he was involved in demonstrating against the Vietnam War, apartheid and nuclear arms. He also worked with the Daughters of Charity to establish De Paul House in Northcote. Lanigan and his wife Krys were members of St Mary's Catholic Parish in Northcote, Auckland.

Lanigan died in Auckland on 24 October 2024, at the age of 76, and his ashes were buried at North Shore Memorial Park.

== Professional career ==
A civil engineer, Lanigan was engineering director for Babbage Partners and later, technology director for Fletcher Challenge Building Industries Group and buildings project sector, general manager of information services for the Fletcher Construction Company and general manager of Fletcher Project Services. Lanigan was principal of AG Lanigan and Associates Ltd. He held directorships in several private companies, was a foundation trustee and was the chairman of New Zealand Housing Foundation (a not-for-profit, charitable trust delivering affordable home ownership for low-income households,) and served with other charitable trusts. He was director of Infrastructure Auckland for five years, between 2000 and 2004. Lanigan was a director of Inframax Construction Ltd and a member of the advisory board of GHD New Zealand Ltd. In 2011, he was a member of the board of the NZ Transport Agency.

== Auckland University of Technology ==
Lanigan was appointed to the council of the Auckland Institute of Technology in 1996 and from February 1999 until the end of that year, he was the chairman of that body. He was chancellor of the Auckland University of Technology between 2000 and 2001 (the first chancellor of the new university), where he was also a founding Trustee from 1998 to 2001.

== Habitat for Humanity ==
A telephone call in 1992 from Michael Powell, a New Zealander who had lived in the United States, invited Lanigan to meet with him and Ian Hay to start Habitat for Humanity New Zealand. A foundation director of Habitat for Humanity New Zealand from 2003, Lanigan was appointed chair the following year. He was elected vice chair of the Habitat for Humanity International board of directors in 2007. In that role, he was responsible for international programmes assisting over 60,000 families annually with their housing needs. As part of these international responsibilities, in 2009, he visited Jogjakarta in Indonesia, where 150 houses were dedicated after a major earthquake and handed over to their owners. Lanigan said that his work for Habitation for Humanity was personally rewarding for its ecumenical involvement, and that it is faith in action, walking the talk. To Lanigan, true faith must be expressed practically. It must be worked out.

== Good Shepherd College ==
In 2012, Lanigan was appointed chairman of the Good Shepherd College Senate.

== Honours ==
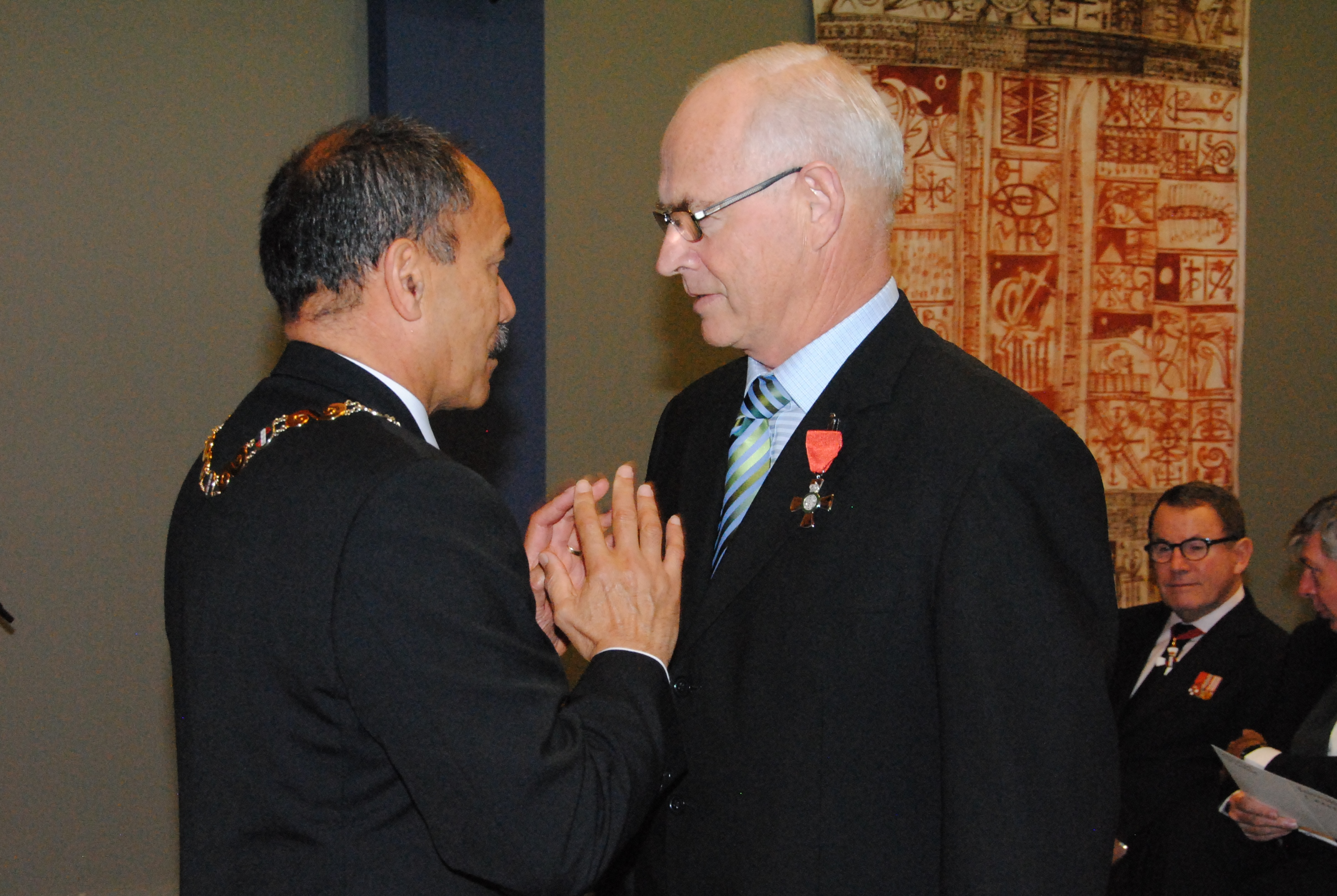
Lanigan's investiture as a Member of the New Zealand Order of Merit by the governor-general, Sir Jerry Mateparae (left), on 9 May 2013

In the 2013 New Year Honours, Lanigan was appointed a Member of the New Zealand Order of Merit, for services to tertiary education and the community.
