= Sheila O'Toole =

New Zealand nun (1929–2024)

Sheila Mary O'Toole CNZM QSO (1929 – 10 June 2024), also known as Sister Mary Laurence, was a New Zealand Catholic nun who worked in Western Samoa and Vietnam. She is the most decorated New Zealander in relation to Vietnam.

== Biography ==
Sister Sheila O'Toole was a member of the order Sisters of Our Lady of the Missions. She worked with indigenous Montagnard refugees at Phuoc Binh in Phuoc Long province from March 1969 to April 1975. She was in Saigon during the Vietnam War, was held in a prisoner of war camp, and was one of the last people to depart from the United States Embassy in April 1975. She also helped Vietnamese orphans leave Saigon in Operation Babylift.

O'Toole returned to Vietnam in 1992 and spent another 12 years there, including working at a hospital for leprosy patients. She introduced fellow New Zealander Sally Morrison to the hospital and Morrison spent many years supporting the centre.

In the 1986 New Year Honours, O'Toole was appointed a Companion of the Queen's Service Order for community service in Western Samoa. In the 2004 New Year Honours, she was made a Companion of the New Zealand Order of Merit, for services as a welfare worker.

In 2007, O'Toole published her memories of Vietnam in Behind the Visor: My Life in Wartorn Vietnam.

In August 2019, O'Toole celebrated her 90th birthday and in January 2020, she celebrated 70 years of service. She died at Atawhai Assisi in Newstead, on 10 June 2024, at the age of 94.
