= Barry Dineen =

New Zealand cricketer

Barry Dineen CNZM
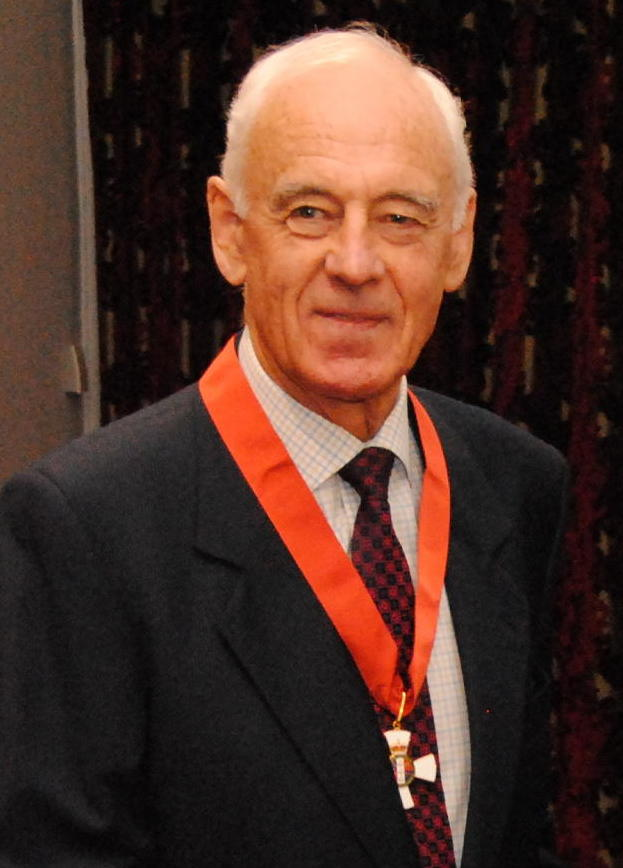
- Dineen in 2013

Personal information
- Full name: Barry Michael Joseph Dineen
- Born: 17 September 1936 (age 90); Christchurch, New Zealand
- Batting: Right-handed
- Bowling: Right-arm medium

Domestic team information
- Years: Team
- 1956/57: Canterbury
- 1962/63–1963/64: Central Districts
- FC debut: 25 December 1956 Canterbury v Otago
- Last FC: 17 February 1964 Central Districts v New Zealand XI

Career statistics
Competition	First-class
Matches	11
Runs scored	298
Batting average	16.55
100s/50s	0/2
Top score	67
Balls bowled	198
Wickets	1
Bowling average	117.00
5 wickets in innings	0
10 wickets in match	0
Best bowling	1/17
Catches/stumpings	4/—
- Source: CricketArchive, 12 August 2021

Rugby union career
- Position: Fullback
Provincial / State sides
Years	Team	Apps	(Points)
- Canterbury
International career
Years	Team	Apps	(Points)
1958	Junior All Blacks		

Barry Michael Joseph Dineen CNZM (born 17 September 1936) is a New Zealand businessman, and former cricketer and rugby union player. He played in eleven first-class cricket matches for Canterbury and Central Districts from 1956 to 1964. He played as a fullback in rugby, representing Canterbury, and touring with the Junior All Blacks to Japan in 1958.

Dineen was appointed a Companion of the New Zealand Order of Merit, for services to business and the arts, in the 2013 New Year Honours.
