= Ian Pool =

New Zealand demographer (1936–2022)

Ian Pool CNZM FRSNZ
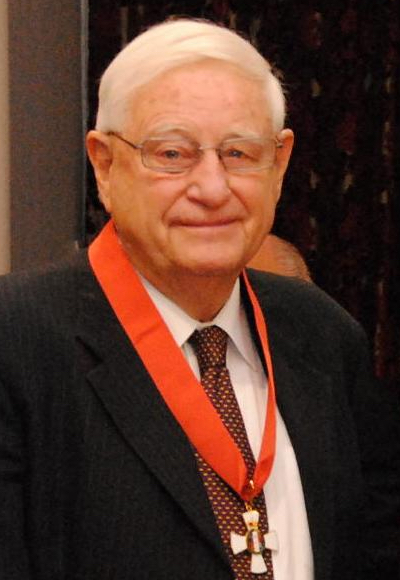
- Pool in 2013
- Born: David Ian Pool; 22 November 1936; Auckland, New Zealand
- Died: 28 April 2022 (aged 85); Hamilton, New Zealand
- Education: Australian National University
- Spouse: Janet Sceats
- Children: 2
- Scientific career
- Fields: Demography
- Workplaces: University of Waikato
- Thesis: The Maori population of New Zealand (1964)
- Doctoral advisor: W. D. Borrie

David Ian Pool CNZM FRSNZ (22 November 1936 – 28 April 2022) was a New Zealand demographer. He was the inaugural director of the Population Studies Centre at the University of Waikato from 1980 to 2004, and was made a professor emeritus when he retired from the university in 2010.

== Biography ==
Born on 22 November 1936 at "Edenholme", a private maternity home in the Auckland suburb of Mount Eden, Pool was the son of Doris Pool (née Messer) and James Pool. He grew up in Dargaville, and went on to study at Auckland University College, graduating with a Bachelor of Arts degree in 1958, and a Master of Arts with second-class honours in 1960. He then earned a PhD at the Australian National University in 1964 with a thesis titled The Maori population of New Zealand, supervised by W. D. Borrie.

An expert on the demographics of Māori from pre-colonial times, as well as on the New Zealand population in general, Pool also researched and published on African demography, and undertook missions for international organisations including the United Nations Population Fund and the Population Council in French- and English-speaking African nations, as well as in Asia and the Pacific. He coined the term baby blippers in reference to the offspring of the later baby boomers in New Zealand, sometimes called the echo boomers.

Pool founded the Population Studies Centre at the University of Waikato in 1980, and remained as director of the centre until 2004. Following his retirement from the University of Waikato in 2010, he was conferred with the title of professor emeritus.

In 1994, Pool was elected a Fellow of the Royal Society of New Zealand, and was awarded the society's James Cook Fellowship for 2004–2006. In 2007, he was accorded life membership of the Population Association of New Zealand. He was appointed a Companion of the New Zealand Order of Merit, for services to demography, in the 2013 New Year Honours.

Pool was married to Janet Sceats, also a demographer, for nearly 60 years, and the couple had two children. He died in Hamilton on 28 April 2022.

== Selected publications ==
- Pool, D. Ian (1991). Te iwi Maori: a New Zealand population, past, present & projected. Auckland University Press. ISBN 1869400496.
- Pool, Ian; et al. (1999). New Zealand's contraceptive revolutions. Population Studies Centre, University of Waikato. ISBN 1877149993.
- Pool, Ian; Dharmalingam, Arunachalam; Sceats, Janet (2007). The New Zealand family from 1840 a demographic history. Auckland University Press. ISBN 9781869403577.
