= 2013 New Year Honours (New Zealand) =

Annual awards for New Zealanders

- Previous: 2012 Queen's Birthday and Diamond Jubilee Honours; Next: 2013 New Zealand gallantry awards
- Type: New Zealand royal honours: New Zealand Order of Merit; Royal Victorian Order; Queen's Service Order; Queen's Service Medal; New Zealand Distinguished Service Decoration
- Date: 31 December 2012
- Country: New Zealand
- Total recipients: 193

The 2013 New Year Honours in New Zealand were appointments by Elizabeth II in her right as Queen of New Zealand, on the advice of the New Zealand government, to various orders and honours to reward and highlight good works by New Zealanders, and to celebrate the passing of 2012 and the beginning of 2013. They were announced on 31 December 2012.

The recipients of honours are listed here as they were styled before their new honour.

== New Zealand Order of Merit ==
=== Dame Companion (DNZM) ===
- The Honourable Justice Judith Marjorie Potter CBE – of Auckland. For services to the judiciary.
- Wendy Edith Pye MBE – of Auckland. For services to business and education.
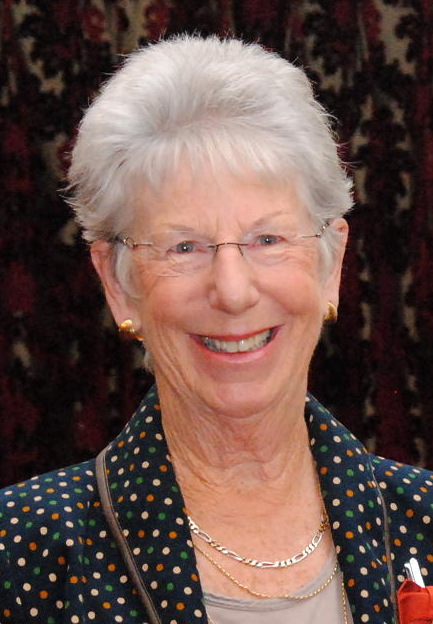
Dame Judith Potter

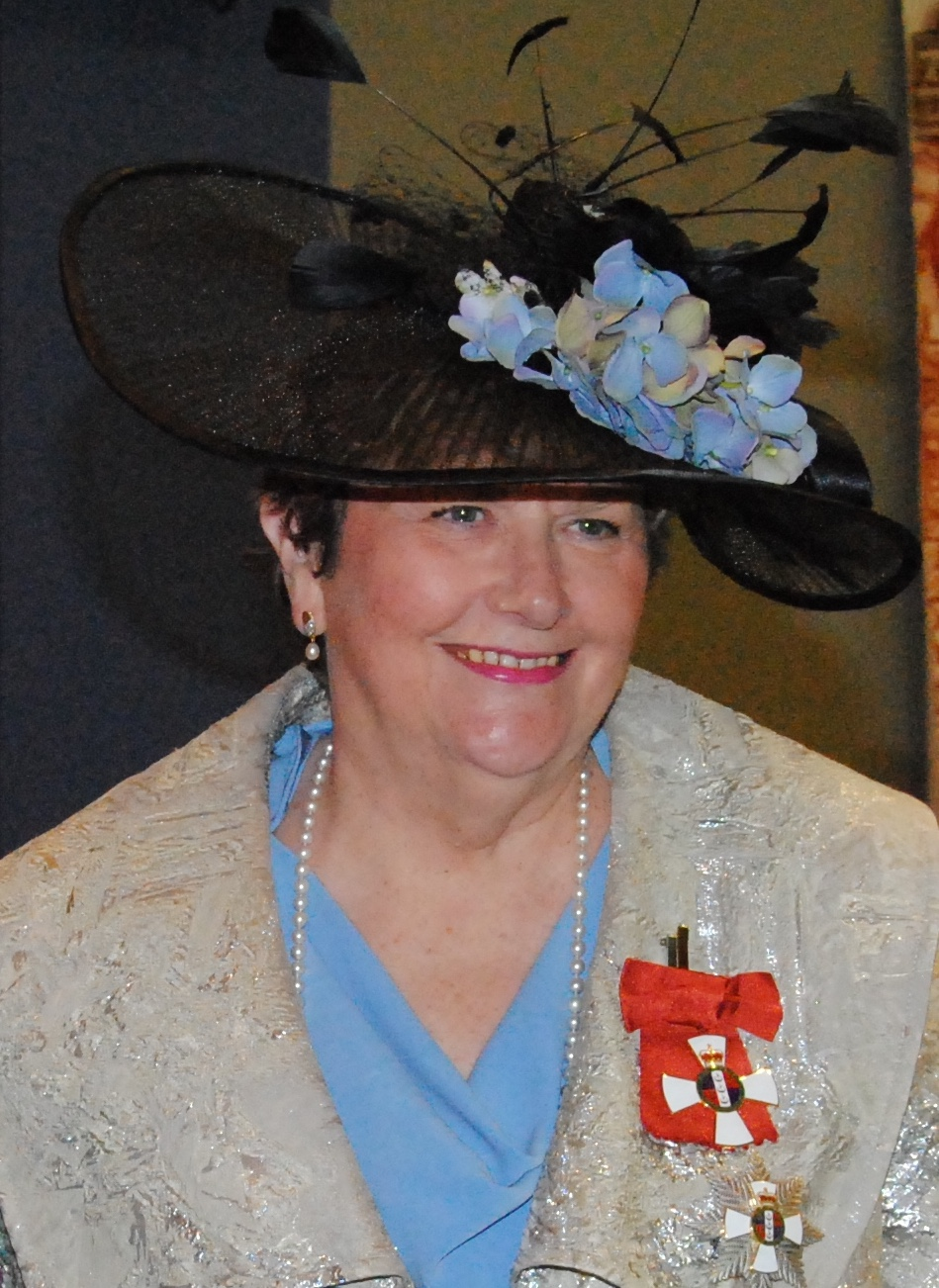
Dame Wendy Pye

=== Knight Companion (KNZM) ===
- Owen George Glenn ONZM – of Auckland. For services to philanthropy.
- Robert Anster Harvey QSO – of Auckland. For services to local-body affairs and the community.
- Paul Scott Holmes CNZM – of Hastings. For services to broadcasting and the community.
- The Honourable Justice Mark Andrew O'Regan – of Wellington. For services to the judiciary.
- Julian Stanley Smith OBE – of Dunedin. For services to business.
- Mark Wiremu Solomon – of Christchurch. For services to Māori and business.
- Mark James Todd CBE – of Swindon, United Kingdom. For services to equestrian sport.
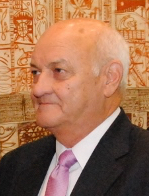
Sir Owen Glenn

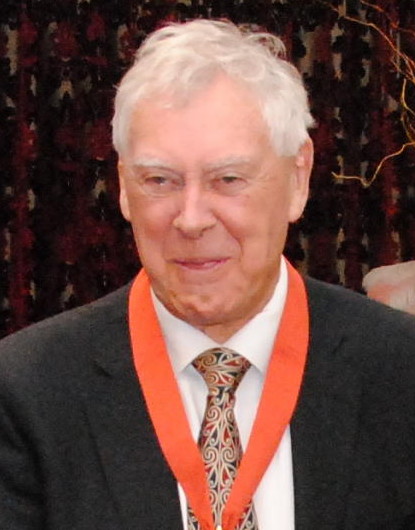
Sir Bob Harvey

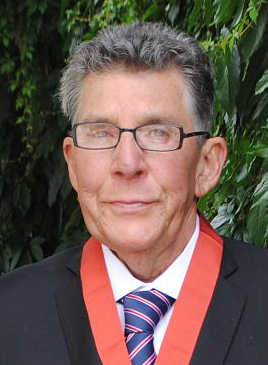
Sir Paul Holmes

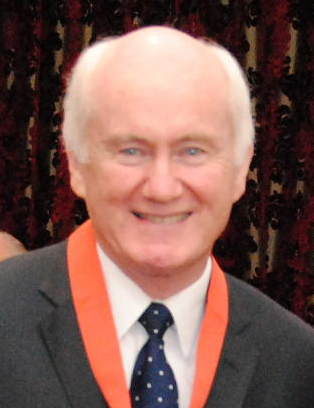
Sir Mark O'Regan

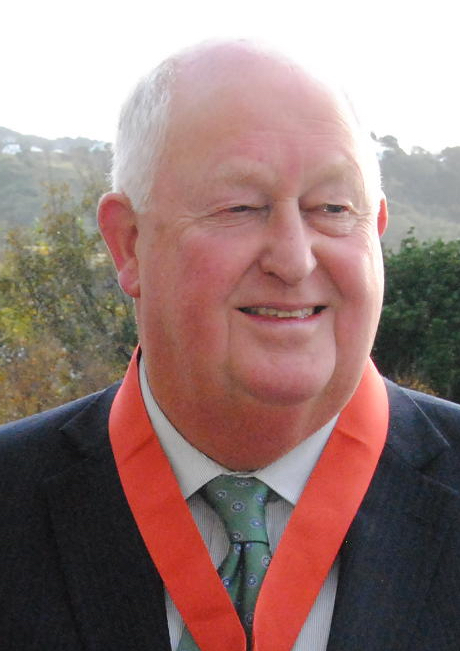
Sir Julian Smith

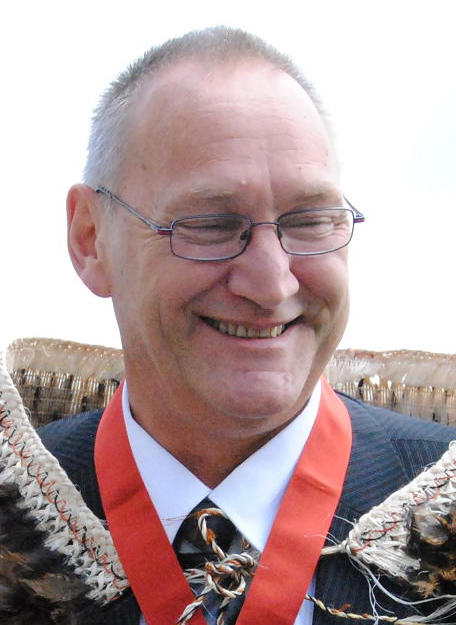
Sir Mark Solomon

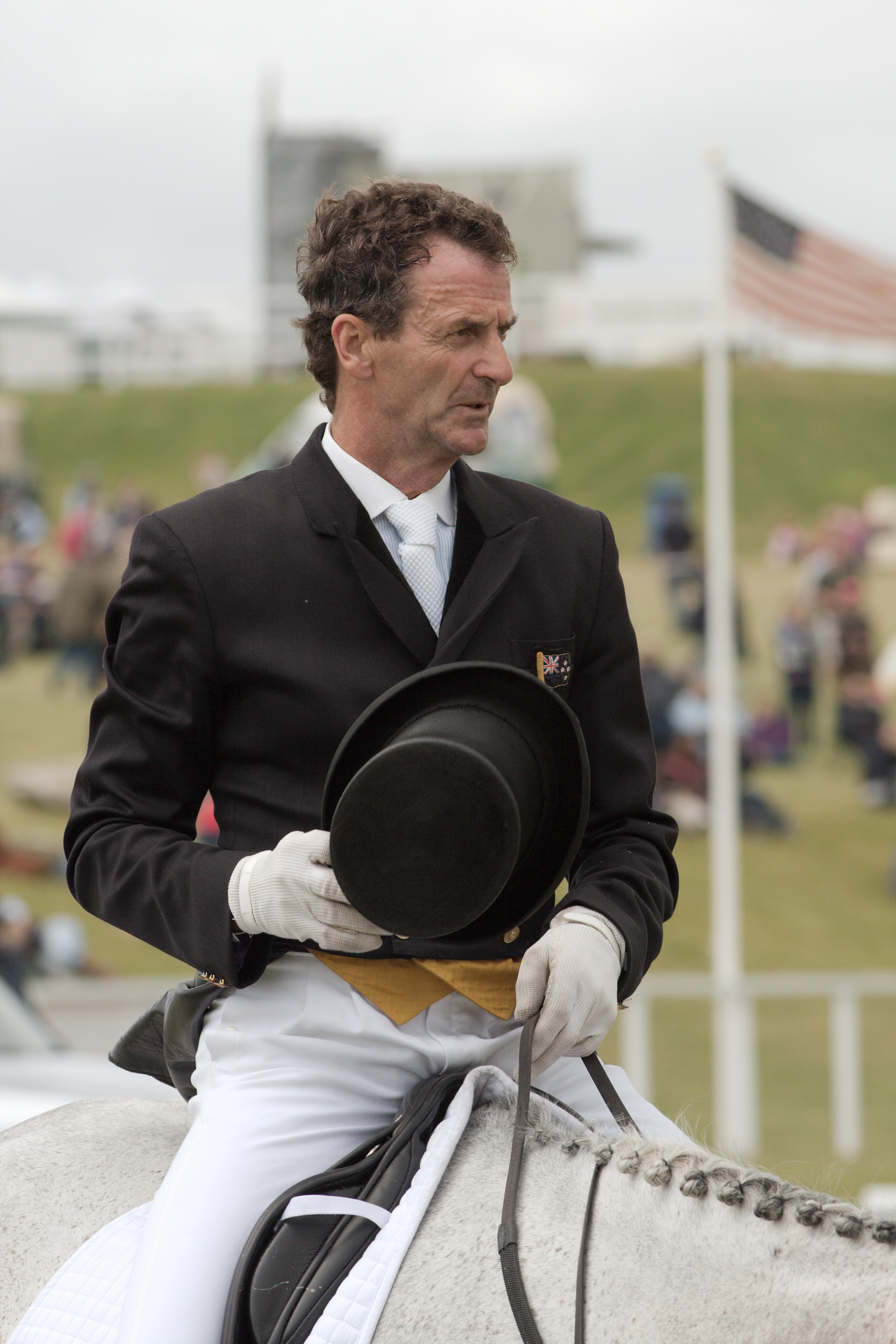
Sir Mark Todd

=== Companion (CNZM) ===
- Dr Alan Esmond Bollard – of Wellington. For services to the State.
- John Kenneth Buck OBE – of Havelock North. For services to the wine industry and the arts.
- Stewart Ian Buckley – of Auckland. For services to technology, business and motorsport.
- Barry Michael Joseph Dineen – of Wellington. For services to business and the arts.
- Professor Ivan MacGregor Donaldson – of Christchurch. For services to neurology.
- Alan Raymond Isaac – of Wellington. For services to cricket and business.
- Hohi Ngapera Te Moana Keri Kaa QSO – of Gisborne. For services to Māori and the arts.
- Dr Lester Levy – of Auckland. For services to health and education.
- Professor David Ian Pool – of Hamilton. For services to demography.
- Geoffrey Thomas Ricketts – of Auckland. For services to education, the arts and business.
- Tūroa Kiniwe Royal QSO ED – of Wellington. For services to education.
- Professor Linda Tuhiwai Te Rina Smith – of Hamilton. For services to Māori and education.
- Fleur De Lyse Ross Sullivan ONZM – of Palmerston. For services to the food industry.
- Dr David John Teece – of Berkeley, California, United States of America. For services to New Zealand–United States relations.
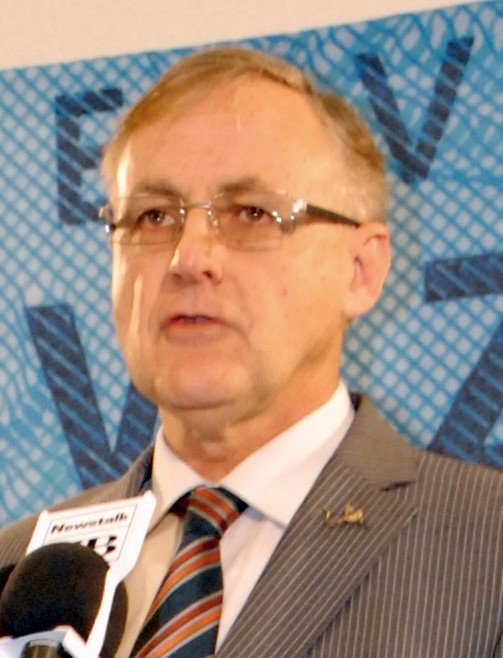
Alan Bollard

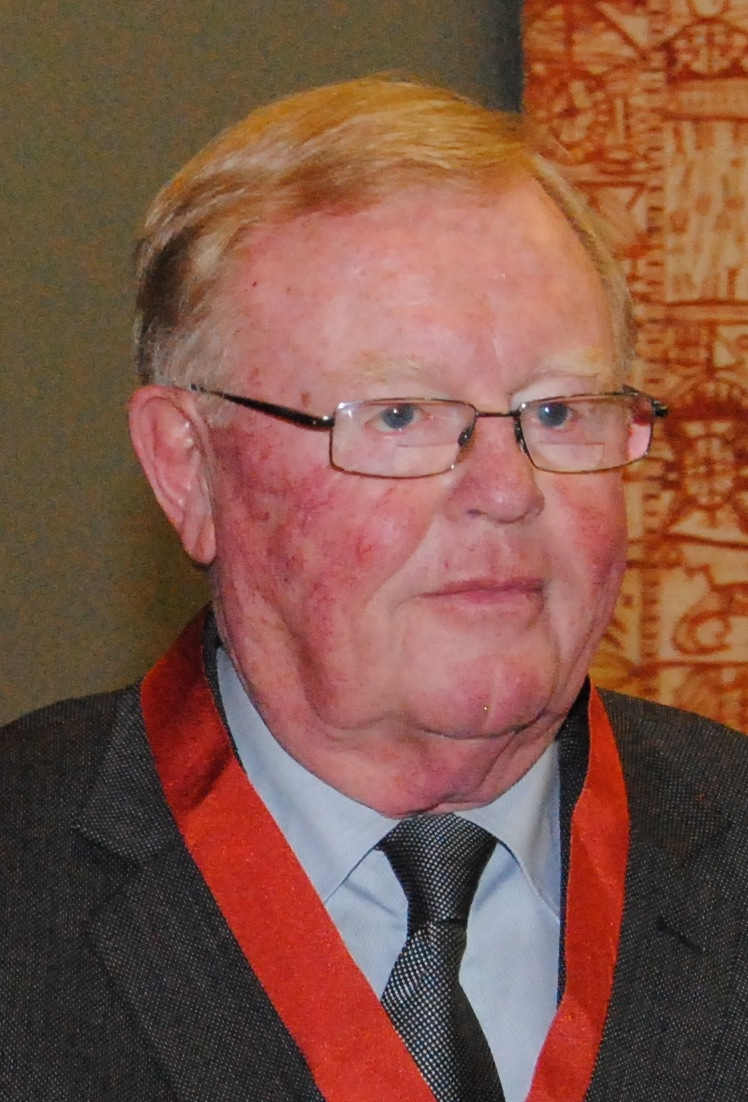
John Buck

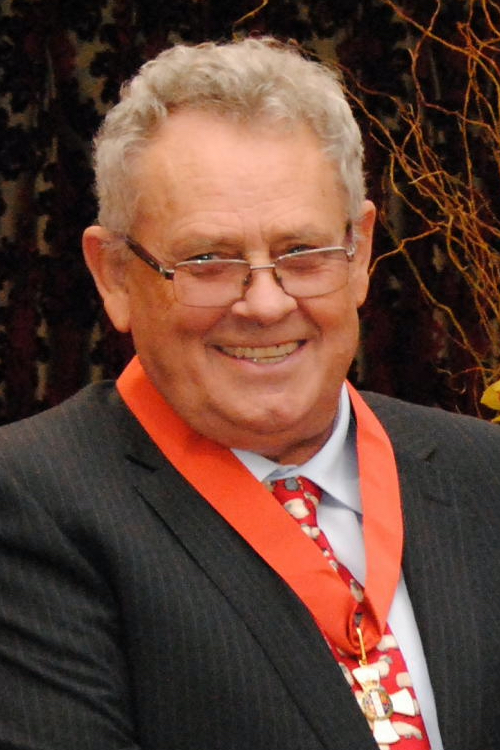
Bill Buckley

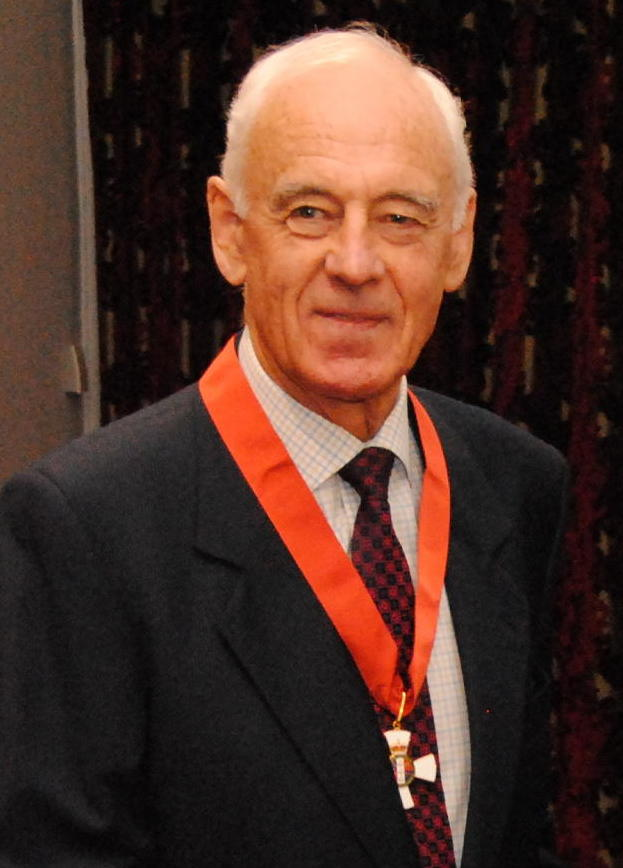
Barry Dineen

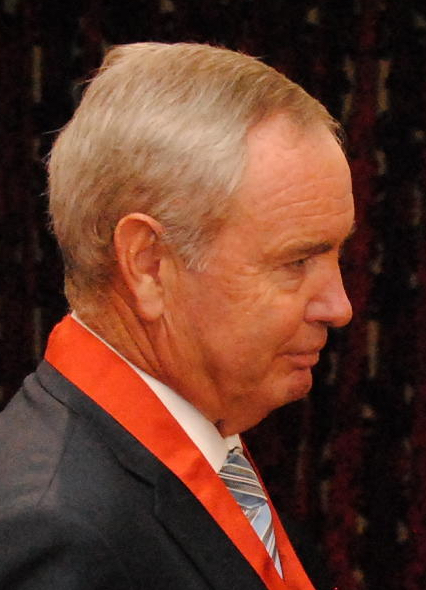
Alan Isaac

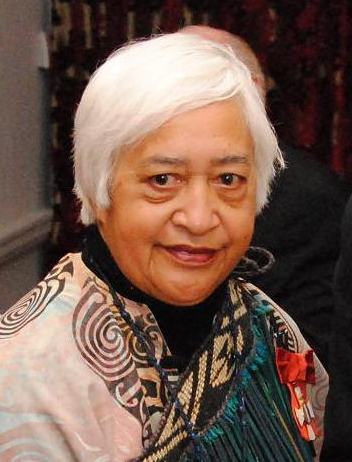
Keri Kaa

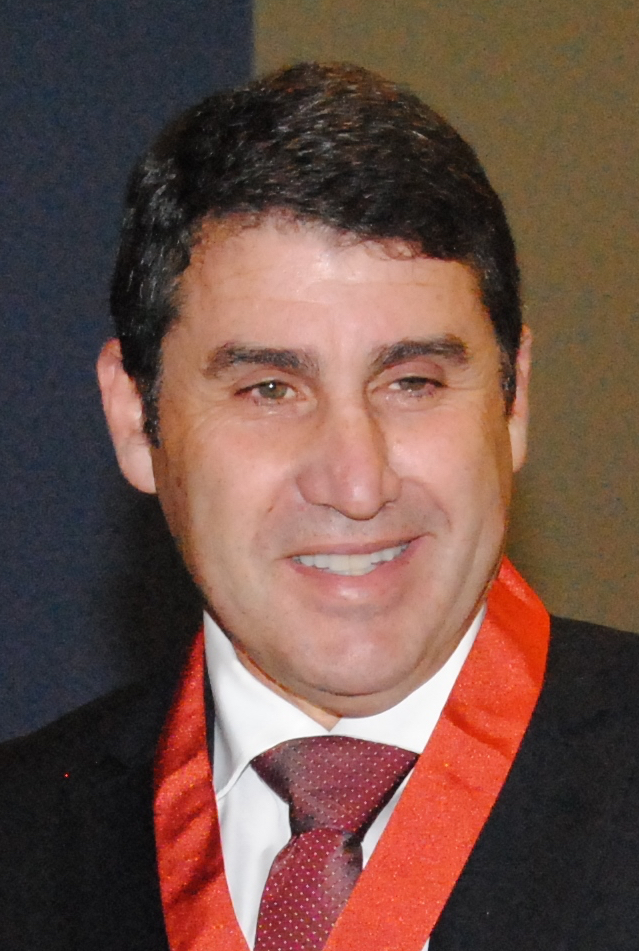
Lester Levy

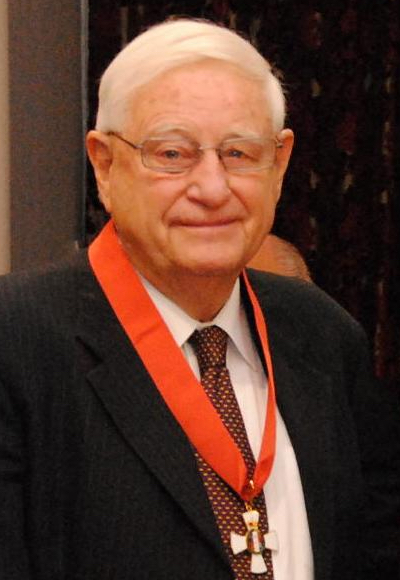
Ian Pool

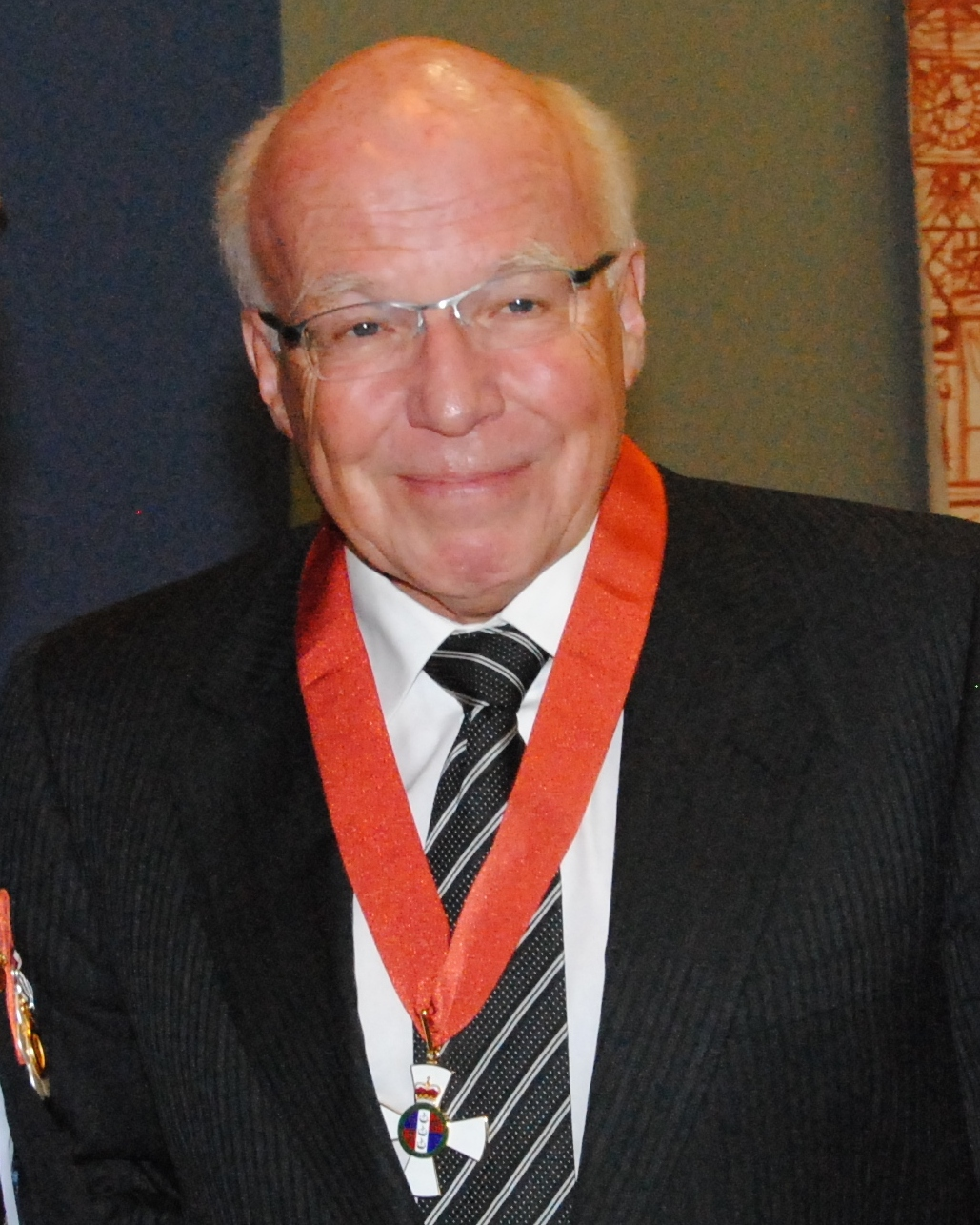
Geoff Ricketts

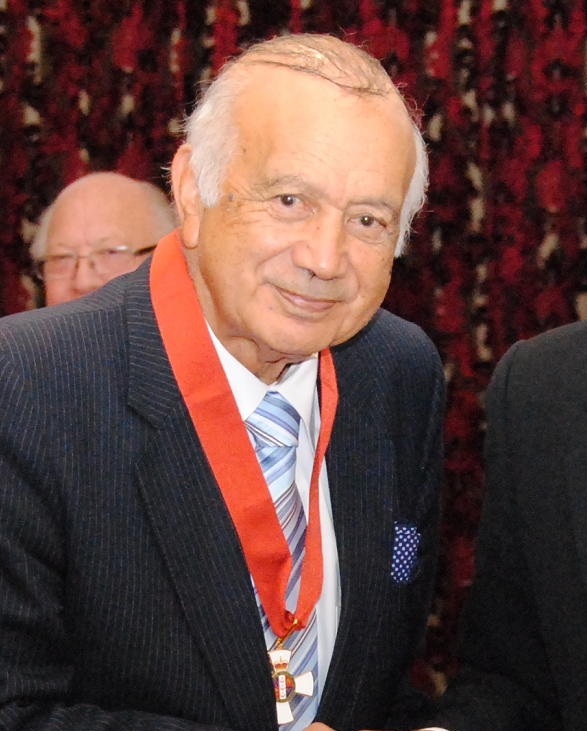
Tūroa Royal

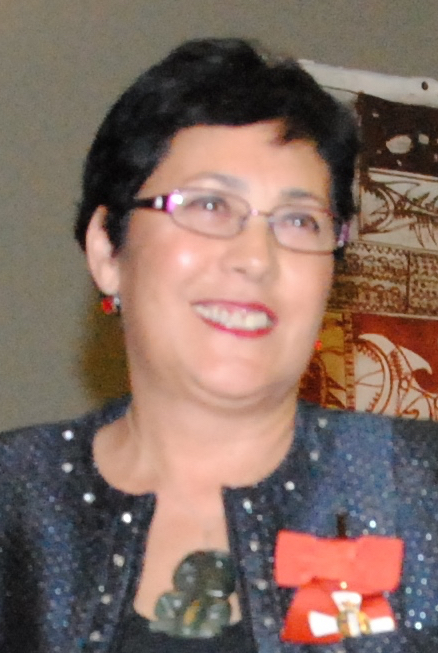
Linda Smith

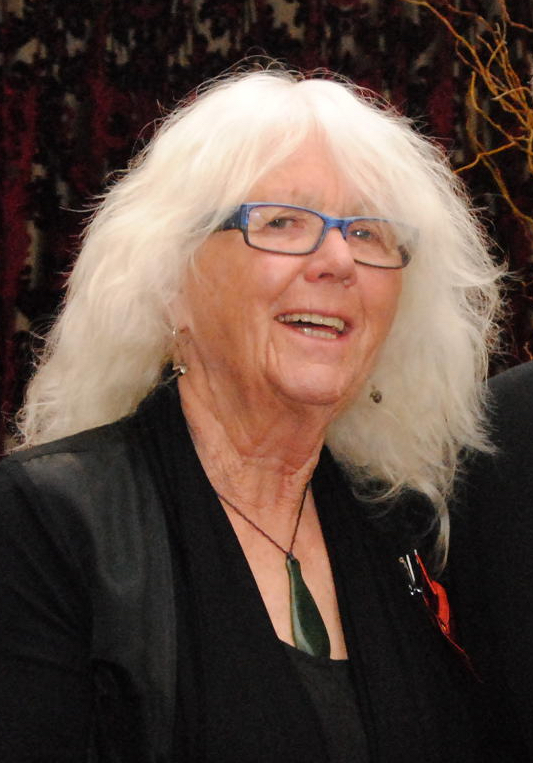
Fleur Sullivan

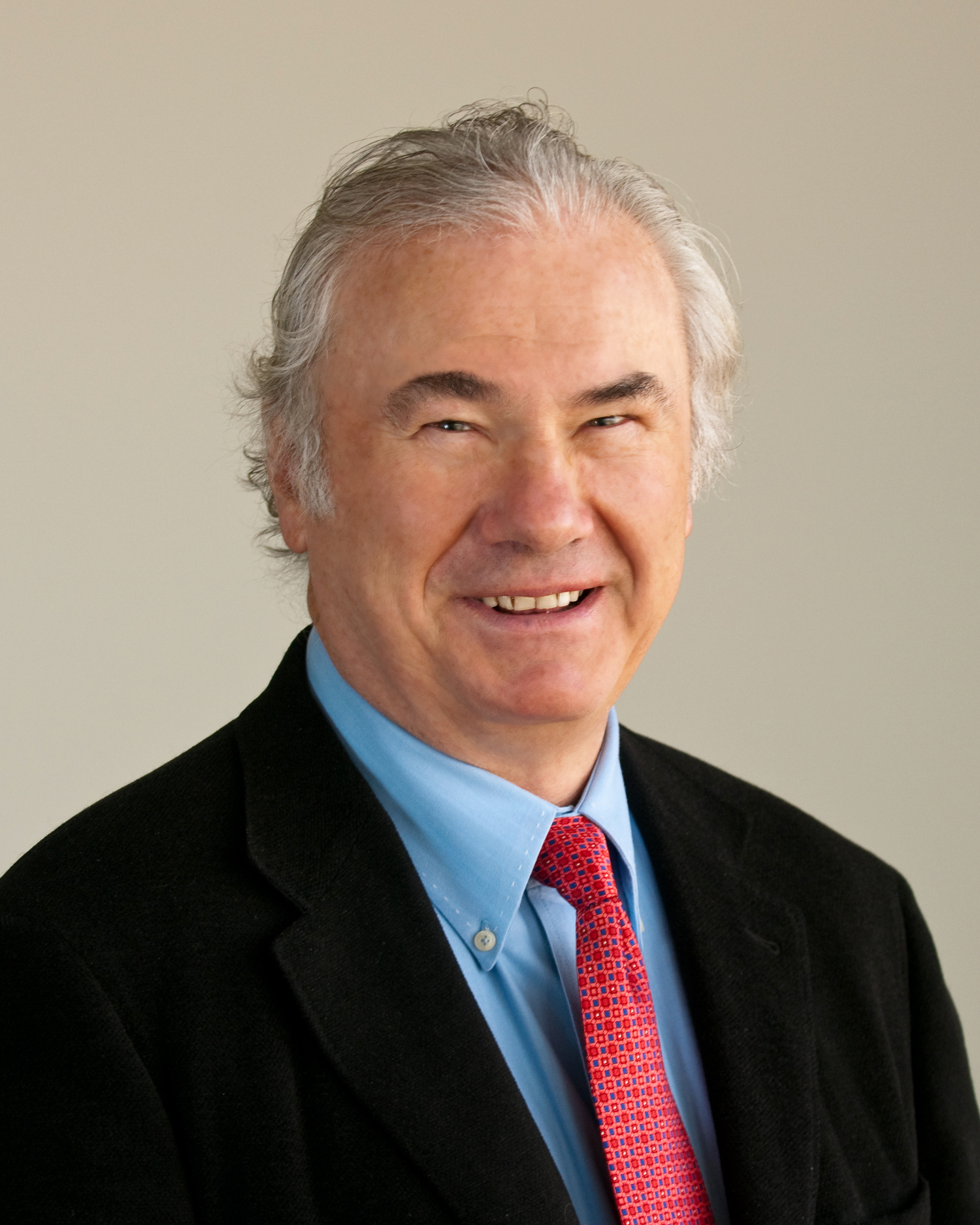
David Teece

=== Officer (ONZM) ===
- Antony Paul Astle – of Auckland. For services as a chef.
- Gavin John Bishop – of Christchurch. For services to children's literature.
- Peter David Broughton (Rāwiri Paratene) – of Auckland. For services to film, television and theatre.
- Associate Professor Ian David Campbell – of Hamilton. For services to breast cancer treatment and research.
- Dr John Laurence Craig – of Whangārei. For services to conservation.
- Professor Emeritus Glynnis Marjory Cropp – of Palmerston North. For services to research in the humanities.
- Doris Theodora Huberdina Zita de Pont – of Auckland. For services to fashion.
- Mary Monica Devine – of Christchurch. For services to business.
- Emeritus Professor Roger John Field – of Wānaka. For services to education and land-based industries.
- Alexander Christopher Kelley – of Dunedin. For services to the New Zealand Police and diplomacy.
- Graham Michael Lowe QSM – of Albany. For services to the community.
- John Morris – of Auckland. For services to education.
- Tuaine-Nurse Tamarua Robati – of Porirua. For services to education and the Pacific community.
- Anthea Isobel Simcock JP – of Hamilton. For services to child welfare.
- John Lindsay Slater JP – of Auckland. For services to the community.
- John William Acton Smith – of Invercargill. For services to business and the community.
- Dr Roderick William George Syme – of Christchurch. For services to athletics and science.
- Henare Rakiihia Tau – of Kaiapoi. For services to Māori.
- Selina Mary Webb JP – of Whakatāne. For services to health and education.
- Dr Philip Seabrook Yates – of Auckland. For services to agribusiness.
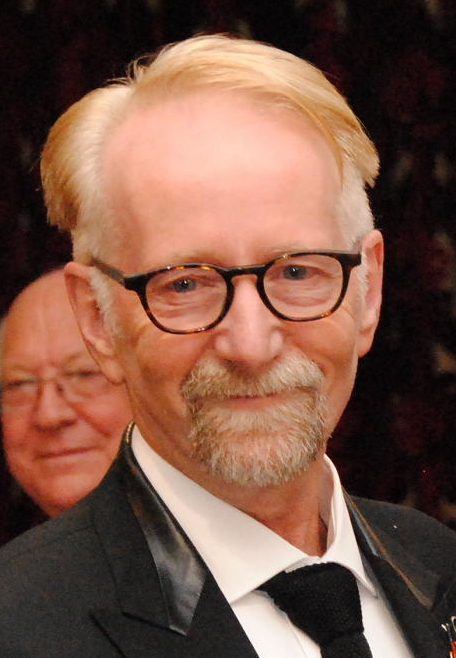
Tony Astle

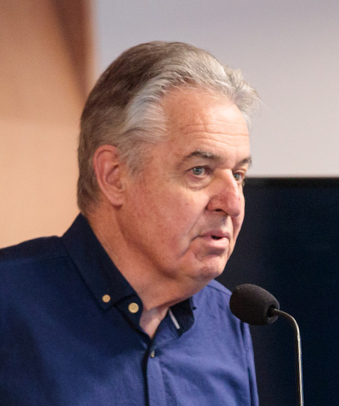
Gavin Bishop

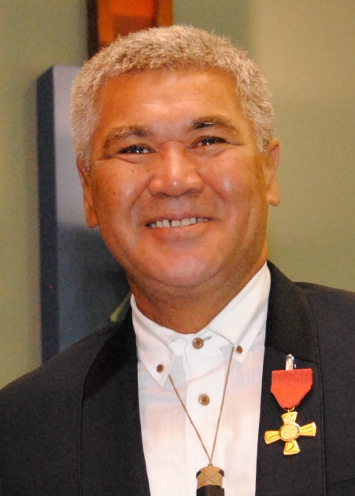
Rāwiri Paratene

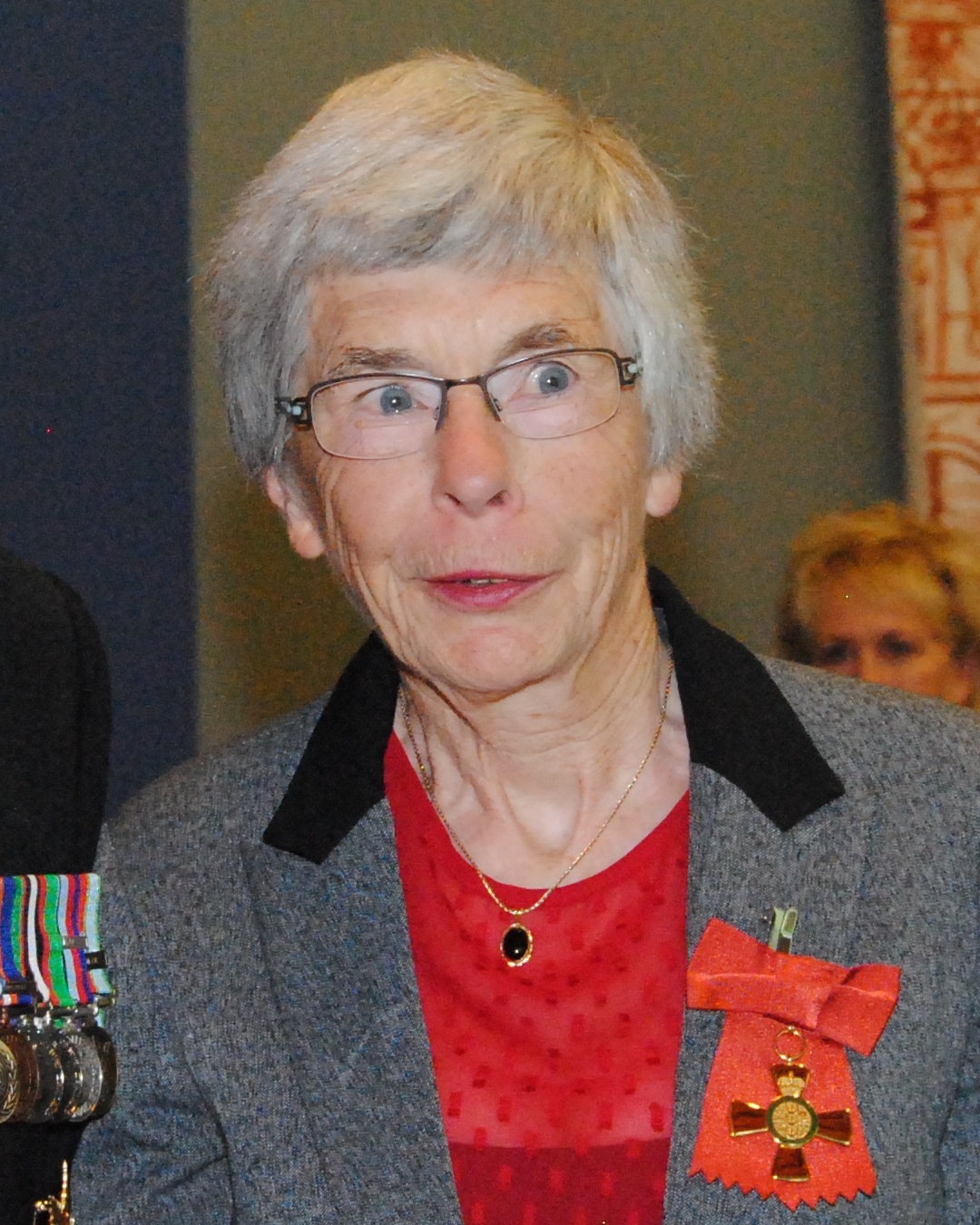
Glynnis Cropp

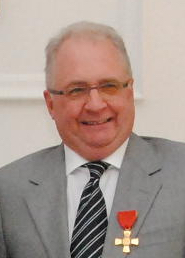
Roger Field

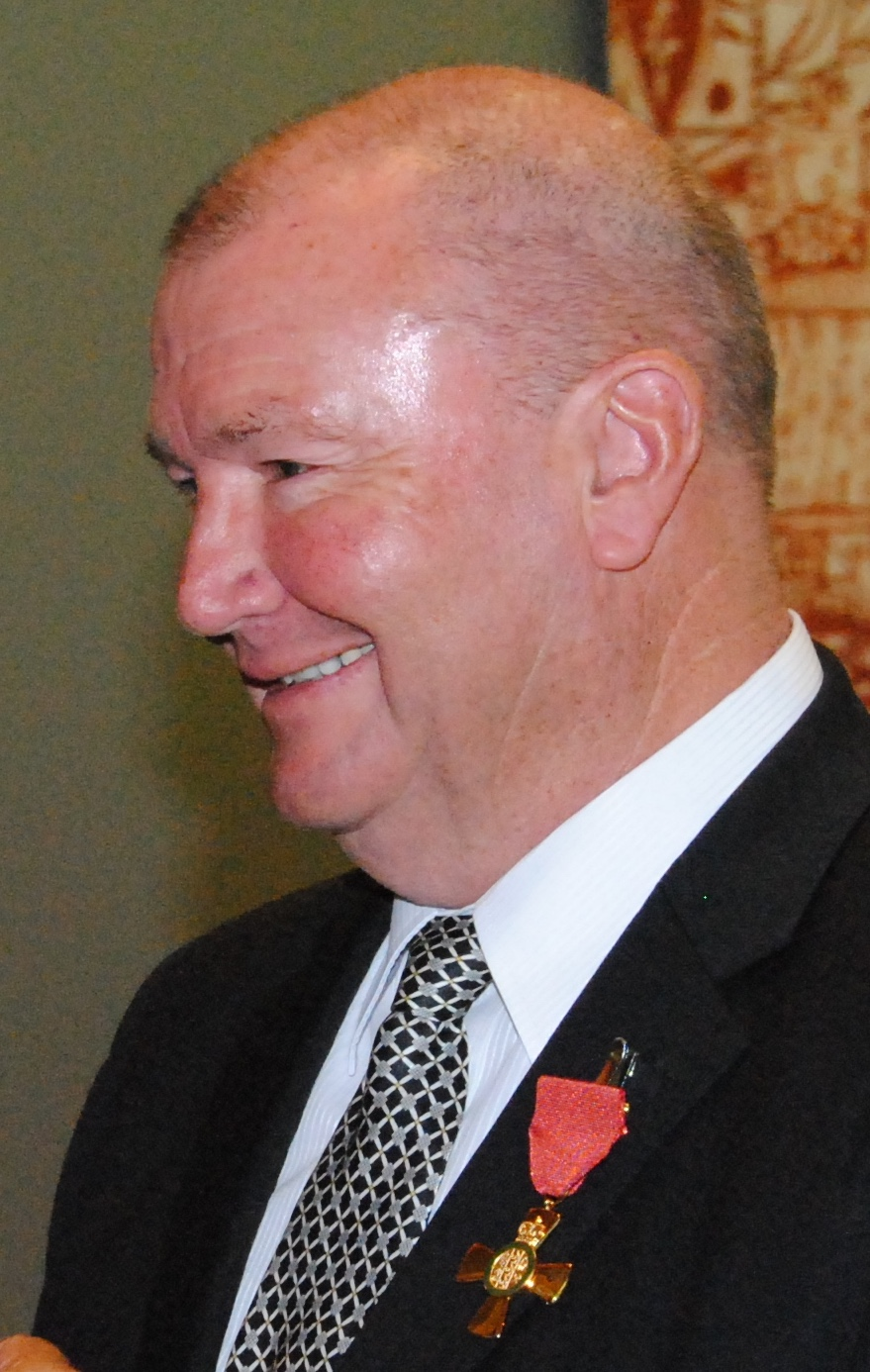
Graham Lowe

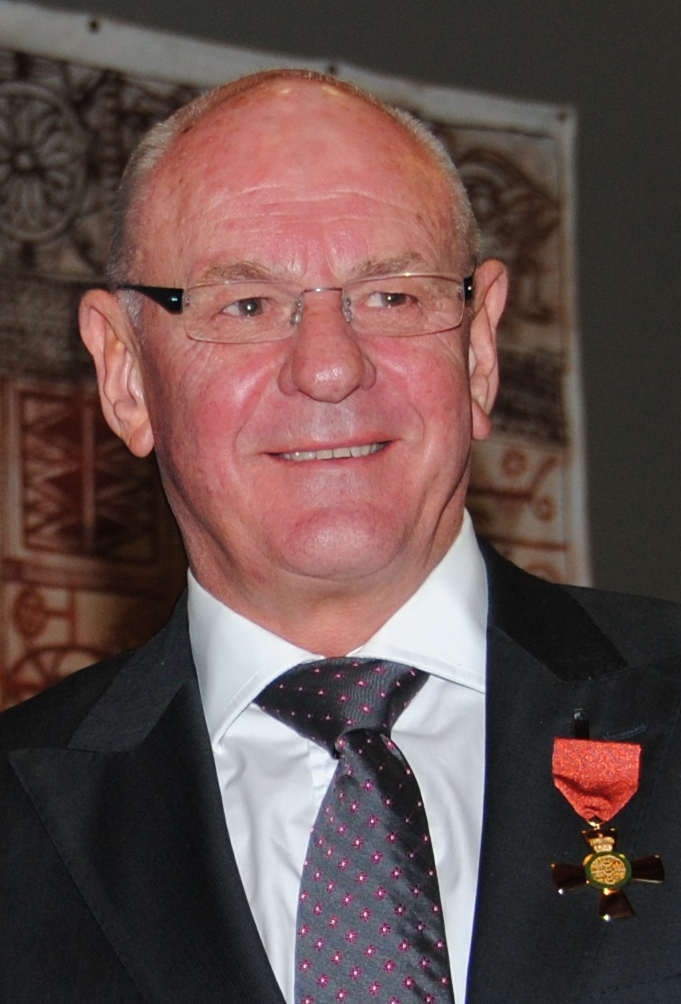
John Morris

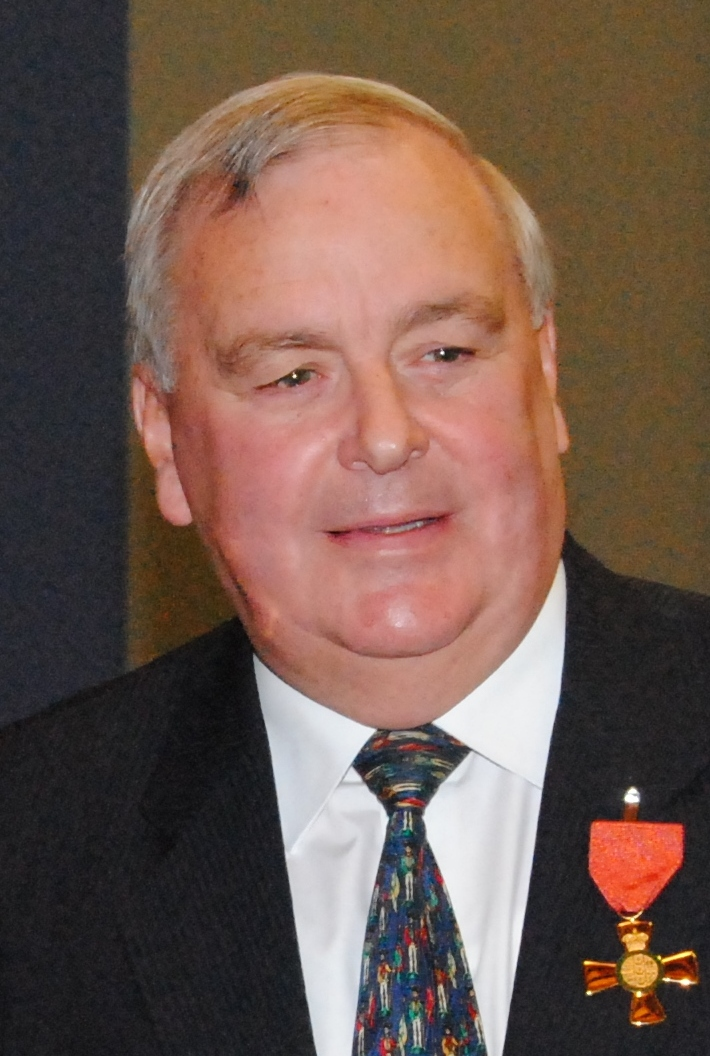
John Slater

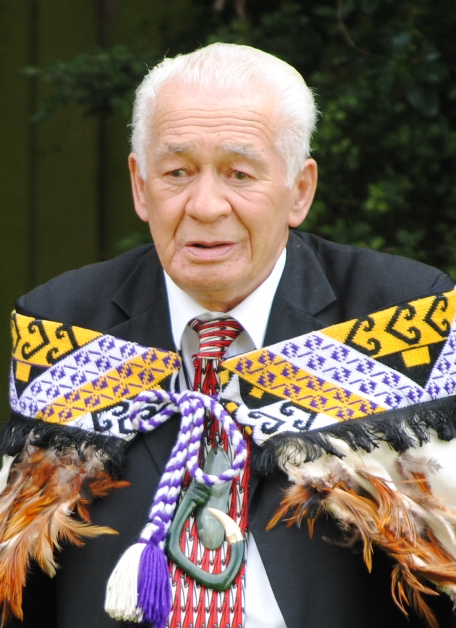
Henare Rakiihia Tau

=== Member (MNZM) ===
- Dr Mohamed Samy Abdel-Al – of Carterton. For services to the community.
- Jo Qesem Ayela Aleh – of Auckland. For services to sailing.
- Senior Sergeant Ian Roy Appley – of Christchurch. For services to the New Zealand Police and the community.
- Stephen Paul Bell – of Auckland. For services to youth.
- Hamish Byron Bond – of Cambridge. For services to rowing.
- Diane Edith Brown – of Dunedin. For services as a writer and educator.
- Lisa Carrington – of Auckland. For services to kayaking.
- Douglas Hewdy Catley – of Wellington. For services to sport and healthcare services.
- Beverley Joan Chappell – of Waikanae. For services to senior citizens and the community.
- Dr William John Childs ED – of Whangārei. For services to health.
- Pamela Marie Coe – of New Plymouth. For services to cycling.
- Nathan Phillip Cohen – of Cambridge. For services to rowing.
- Laurence Killoh Cooney – of Christchurch. For services to business, law and the community.
- Ian Trevor Corney – of Taumarunui. For services to agriculture.
- Jeanette Crosado – of Dunedin. For services to animal welfare.
- Dr Mary Margaret Dawson – of Auckland. For services to the Girl Guides and the community.
- Frances Denz – of Tauranga. For services to business.
- Wendy Duff – of Auckland. For services to people with autism.
- Laura Fairweather – of Tokanui. For services to cycling.
- Mary Elizabeth Fisher – of Upper Hutt. For services to swimming.
- Sylvia Pearl Frame – of Napier. For services to nursing, motoring and the community.
- Phillipa Gray – of Thames. For services to cycling.
- Inspector Mark Stanley Harrison – of Palmerston North. For services to the New Zealand Police and the community.
- John Graham Hartnell – of Christchurch. For services to the community and beekeeping.
- Ian Wilson Hay JP – of Auckland. For services to the community.
- Vicki Cathryn Hyde – of Christchurch. For services to science.
- Maia Giselle Jackman – of Auckland. For services to football.
- Peter Francis Jensen – of Whangārei. For services to the community.
- Kathleen Frances Joblin – of Whanganui. For services to health.
- Sumant Lala – of Auckland. For services to the Child Cancer Foundation.
- Dr Anthony Gerard Lanigan – of Auckland. For services to tertiary education and the community.
- Alison Maree Marshall – of Hamilton. For services to the community.
- Robert Patrick McDavitt – of Auckland. For services to meteorology and yachting.
- Geoffrey Mirkin – of Dunedin. For services to the community.
- Sally Christine Morrison – of Tauranga. For services to health and the community.
- Eric Gordon Murray – of Cambridge. For services to rowing.
- Professor Vincent Ernest Neall – of Palmerston North. For services to earth science.
- Geoffrey Watts Neilson – of Mosgiel. For services to agriculture.
- Anthony James Norman – of Mangonui. For services to the community.
- Peter James Ombler – of Te Puke. For services to the kiwifruit industry.
- Ian Maurice Phillips – of New York, United States of America. For services to New Zealand–United States relations.
- Olivia Elizabeth Powrie – of Auckland. For services to sailing.
- Jacob Rajan – of Wellington. For services to theatre.
- Dr Reena Ramsaroop – of Auckland. For services as a histocytopathologist.
- Dr James Stewart Reid – of Lower Hutt. For services to health.
- Ronald Alexander Robertson – of Gisborne. For services to athletics.
- Inspector Wendy Lynne Robilliard – of Kerikeri. For services to the New Zealand Police and the community.
- David John Saunders – of Christchurch. For services to land search and rescue.
- James Samuel Stuart-Black – of Wellington. For services to the New Zealand Fire Service and Urban Search and Rescue.
- Joseph Sullivan – of Cambridge. For services to rowing.
- Lorna Winifred Sullivan – of Tauranga. For services to people with disabilities.
- Miriam Swarbrick – of Gisborne. For services to senior citizens and the community.
- Dr David Emil Mynott Taylor – of Rotorua. For services to pathology and Māori.
- Inspector William John Taylor – of Auckland. For services to the New Zealand Police and the community.
- Peter Robert Tyler Thorburn – of Auckland. For services to rugby.
- Nilima Venkatakrishnan – of Auckland. For services to senior citizens and the Indian community.
- Denise Brenda Walsh – of Dunedin. For services to youth theatre.
- John Raymond Wheeler – of New Plymouth. For services to the horse racing industry.
- Susan Barbara Worthington – of Waikanae. For services as a botanical artist.

Honorary

- Kathleen Brader – of Centreville, Virginia, United States of America. For services to kiwi conservation.
- The Honourable Christopher Robert Hill – of Denver, Colorado, United States of America. For services to New Zealand–United States relations.
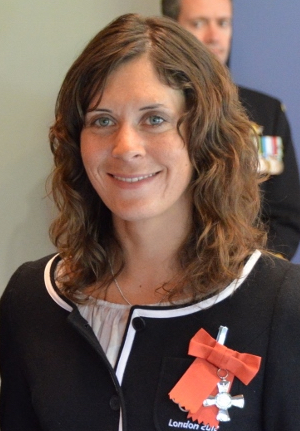
Jo Aleh

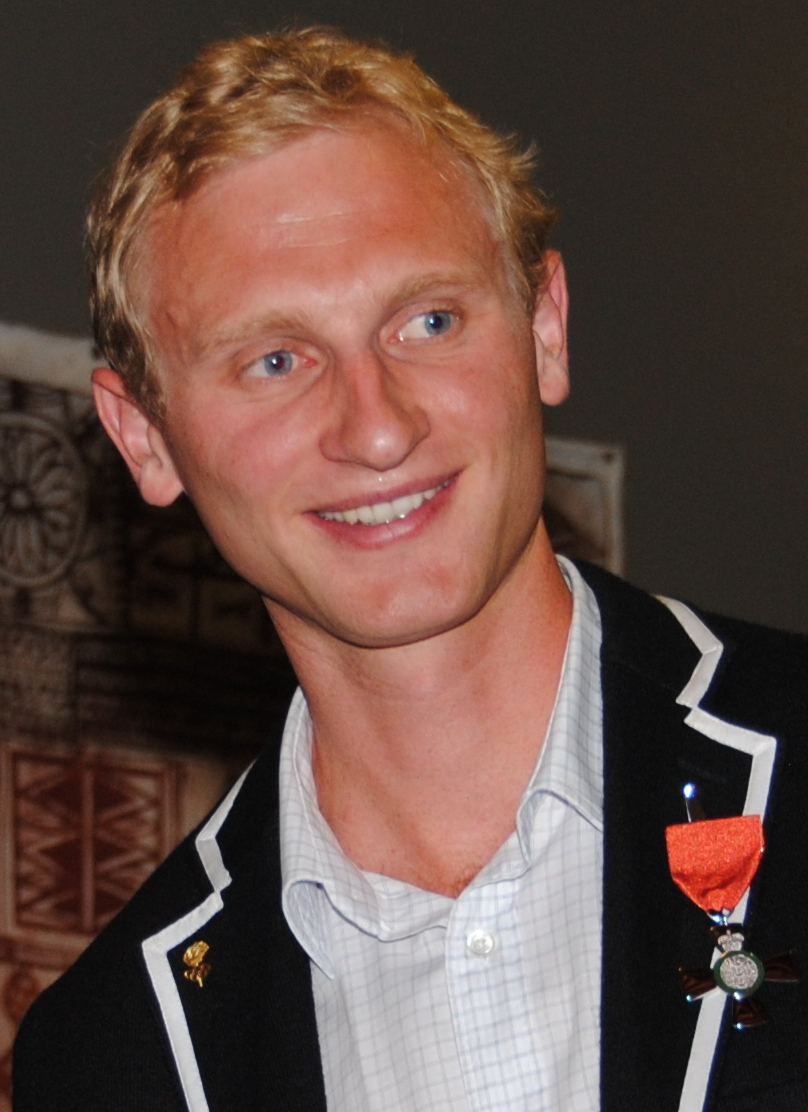
Hamish Bond

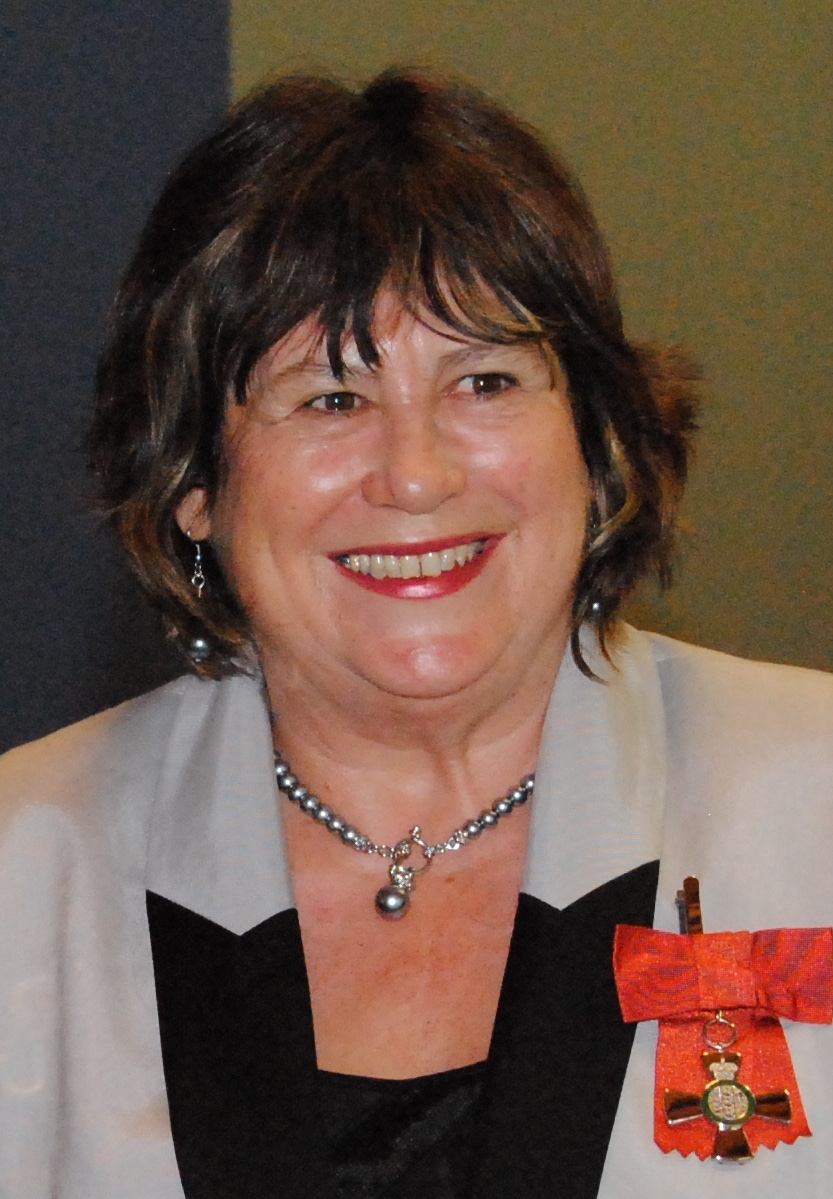
Diane Brown

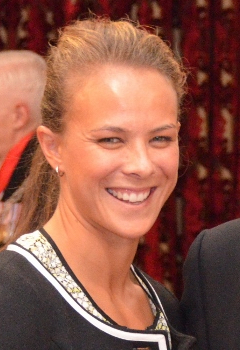
Lisa Carrington

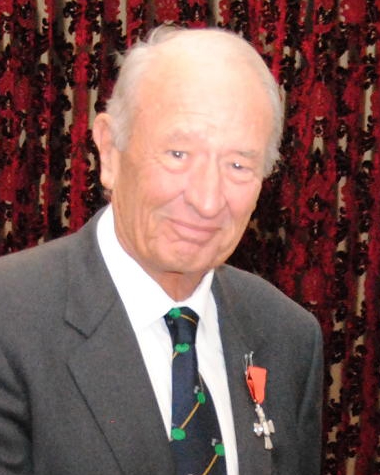
Doug Catley

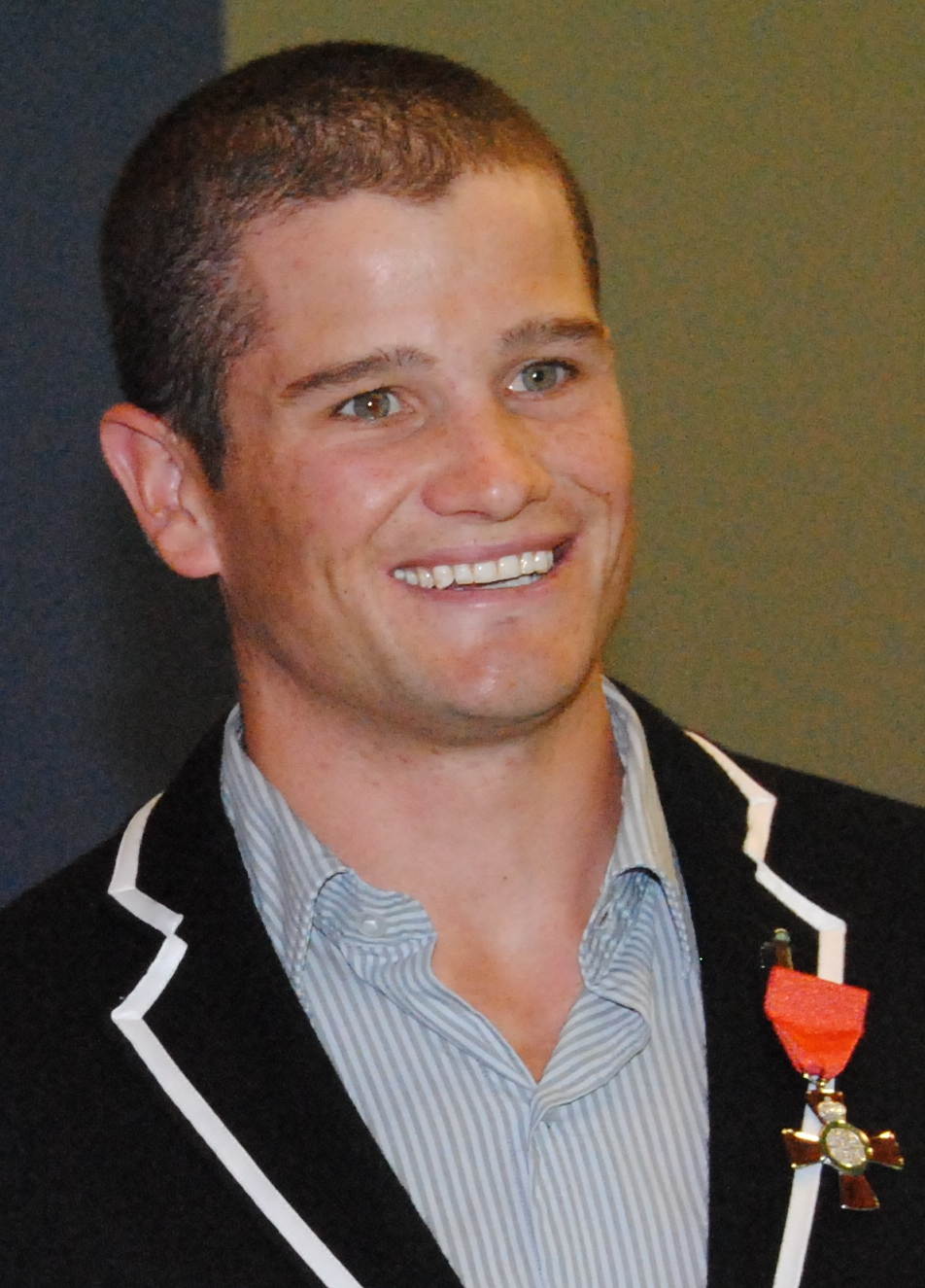
Nathan Cohen

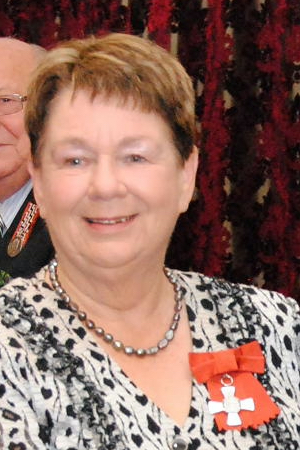
Frances Denz

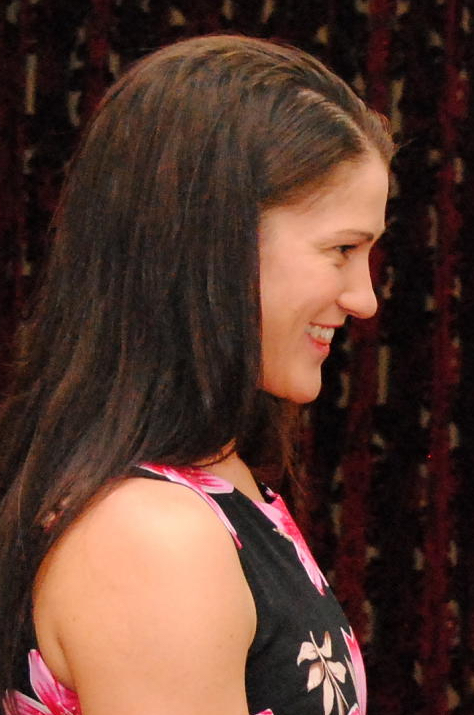
Laura Fairweather

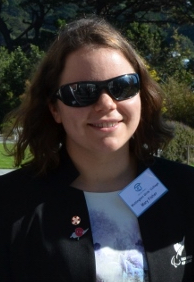
Mary Fisher

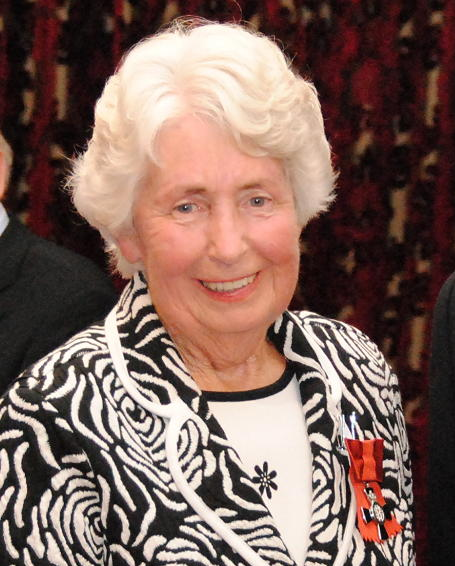
Sylvia Frame

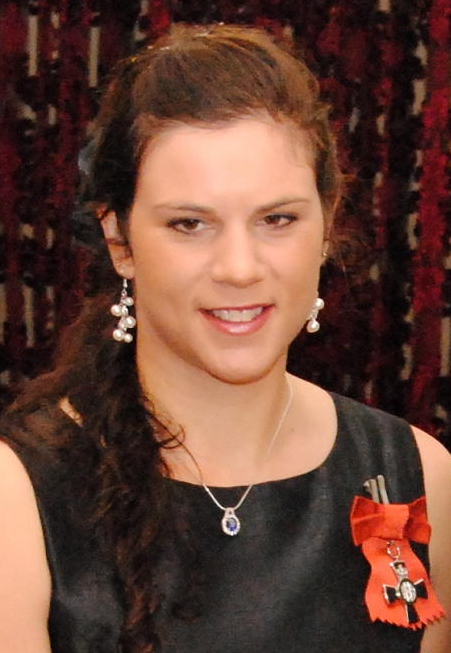
Phillipa Gray

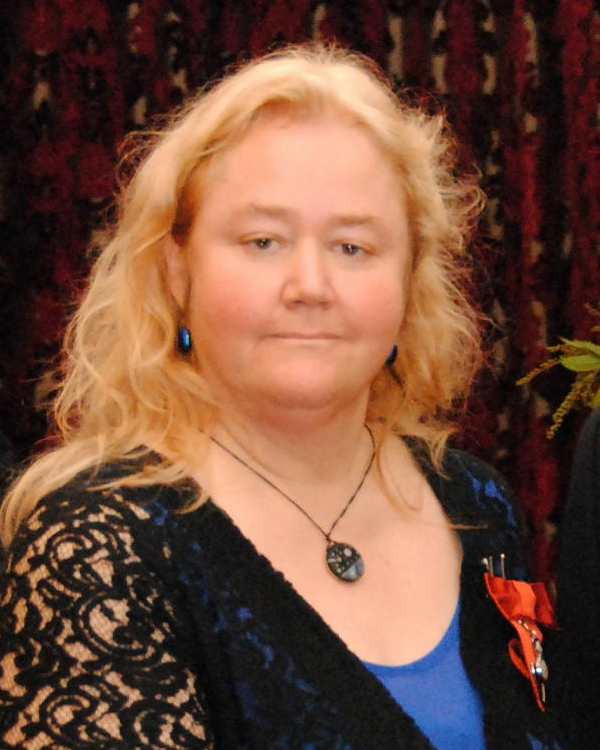
Vicki Hyde

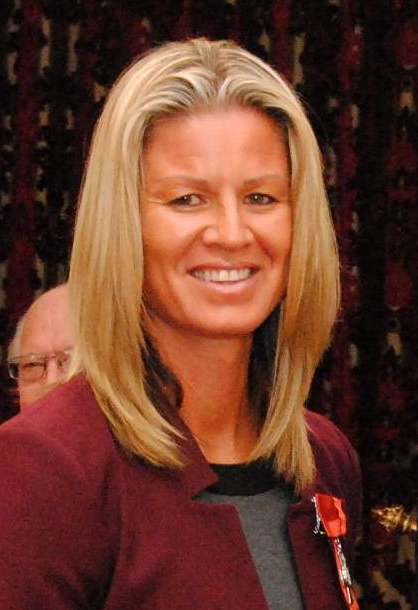
Maia Jackman

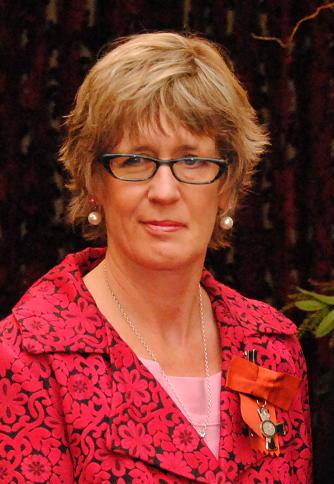
Kate Joblin

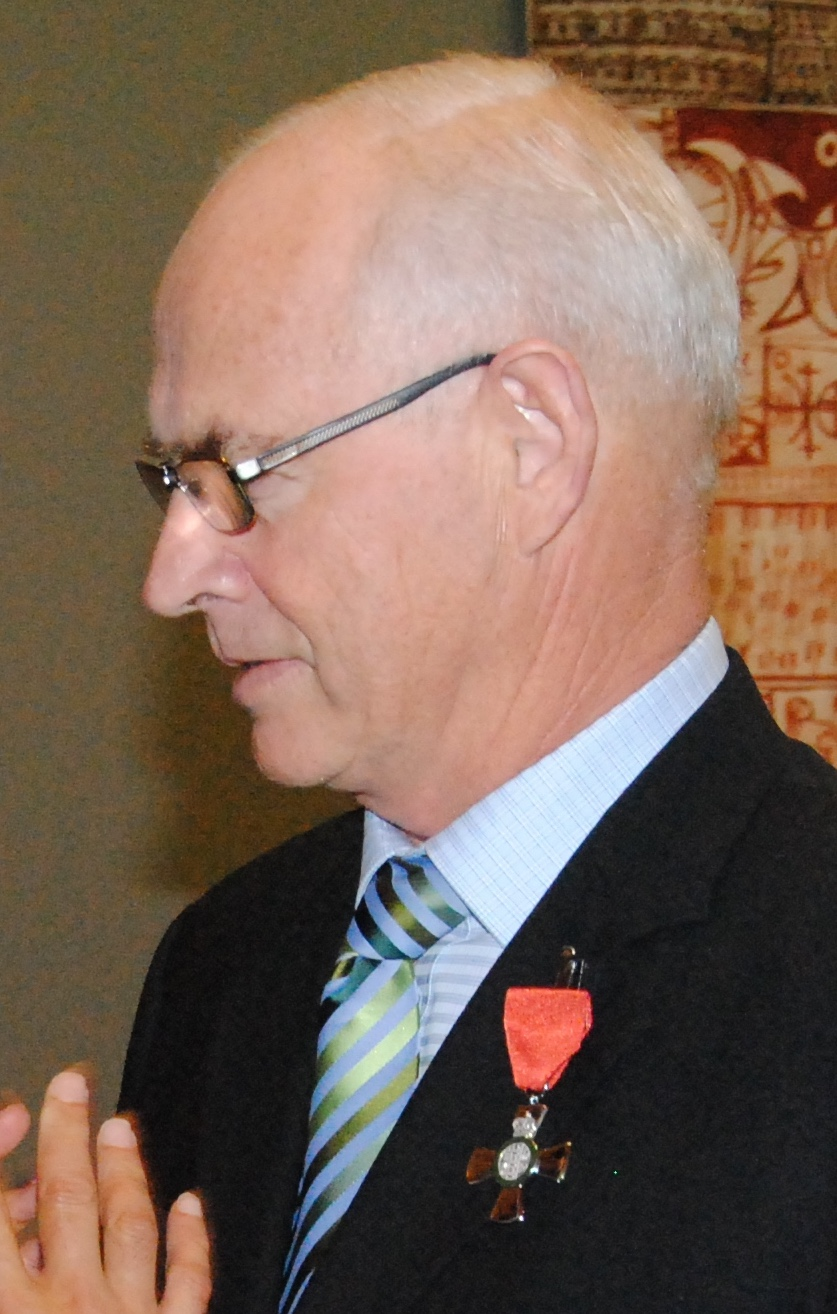
Tony Lanigan

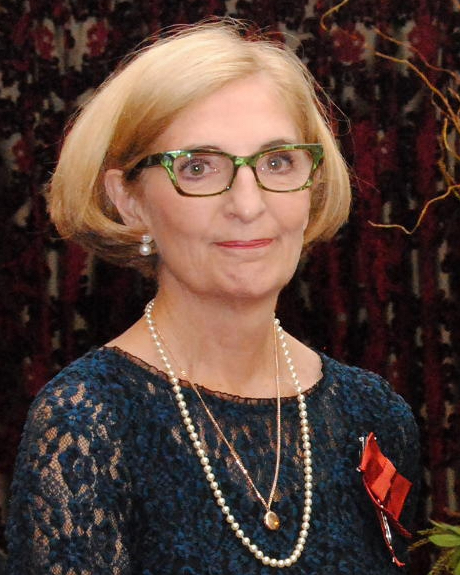
Sally Morrison

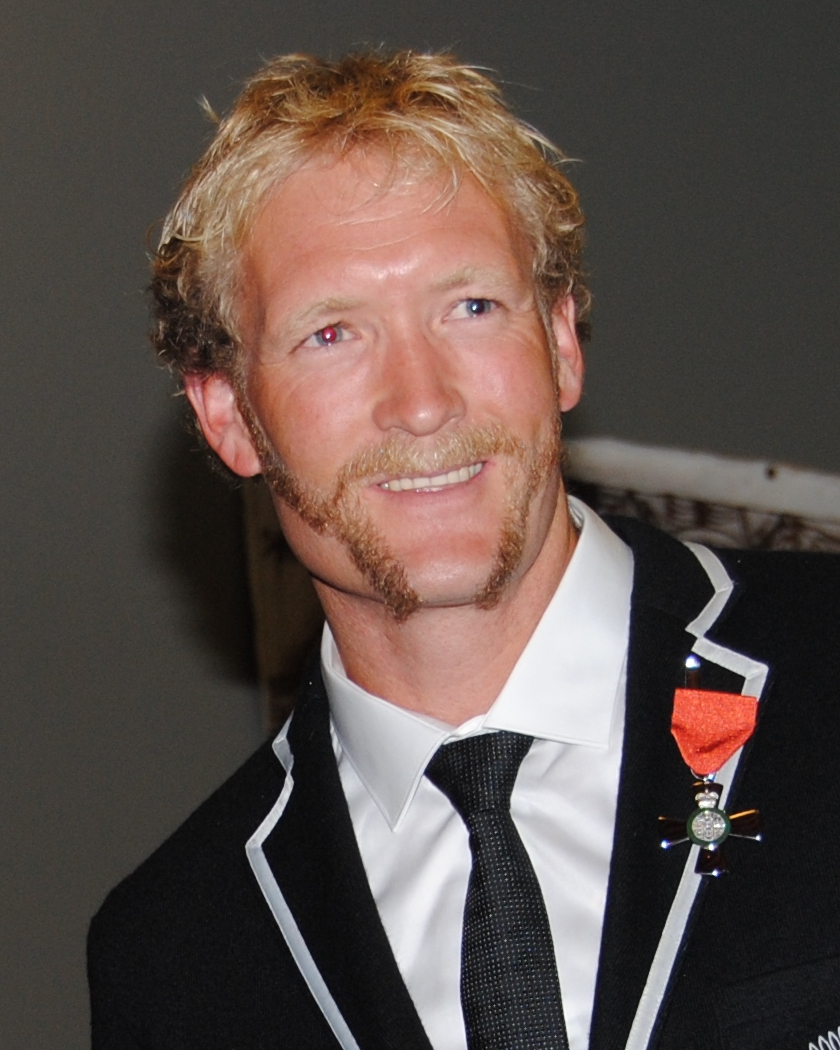
Eric Murray

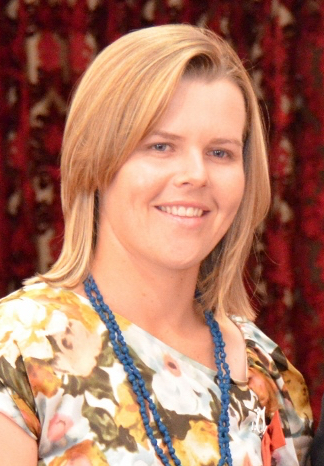
Polly Powrie

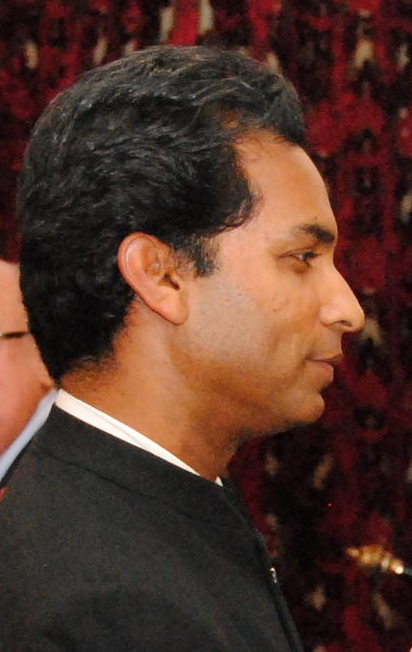
Jacob Rajan

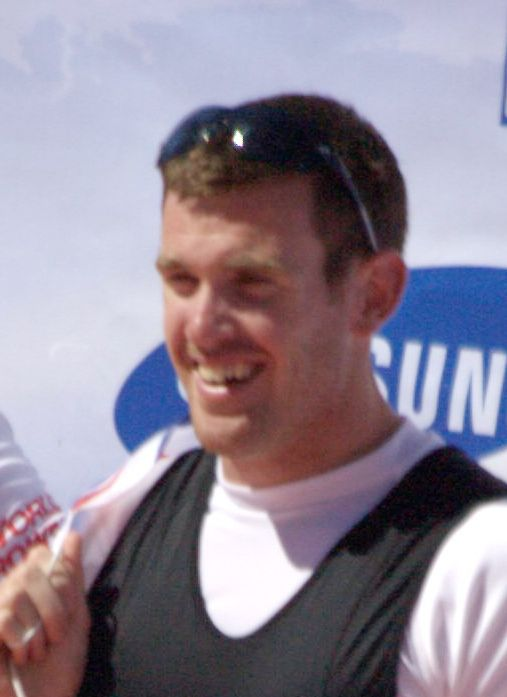
Joseph Sullivan

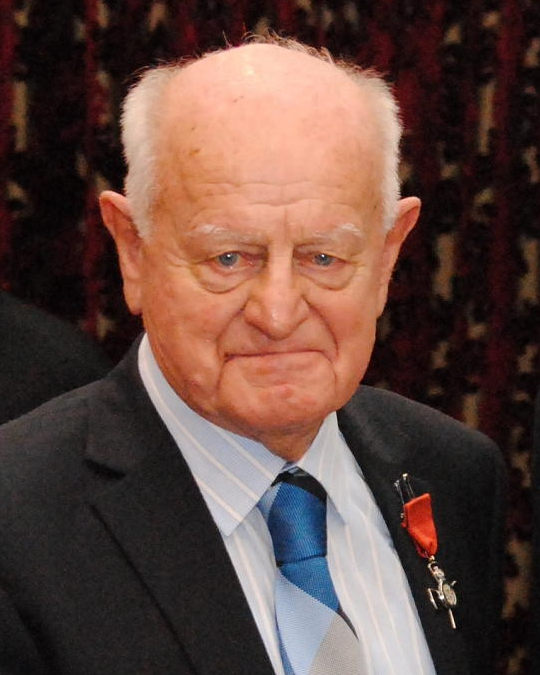
David Taylor

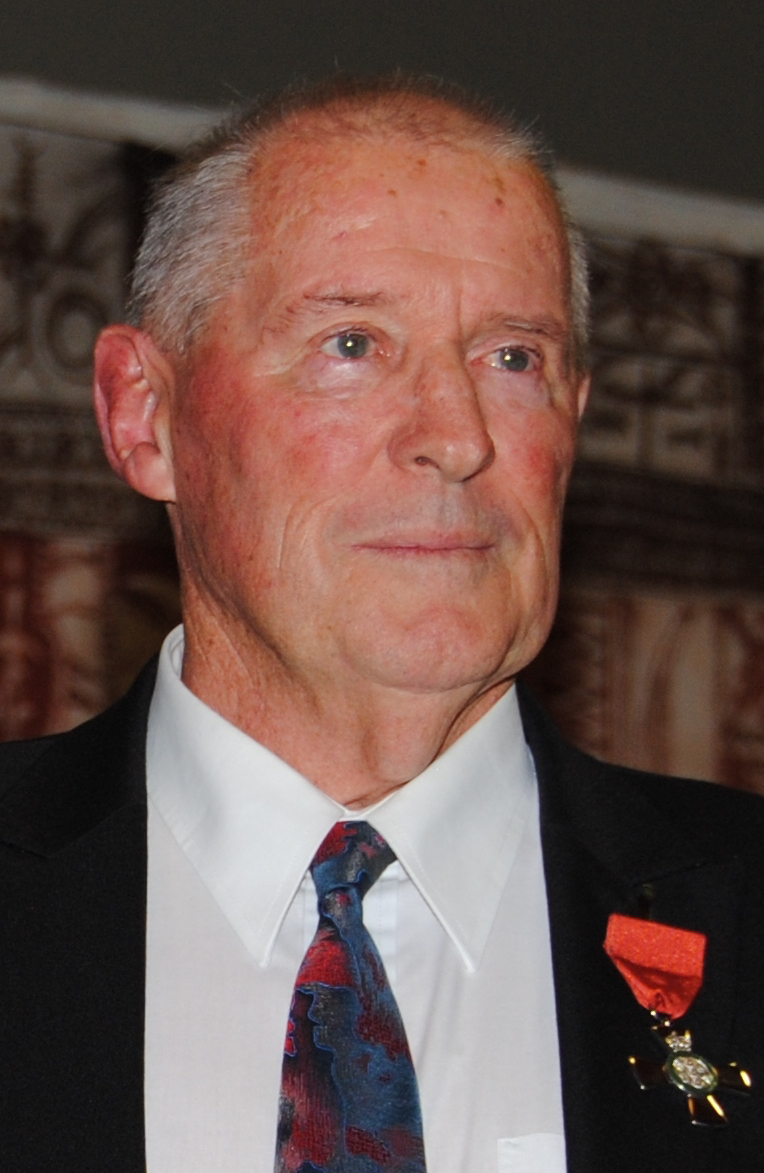
Peter Thorburn

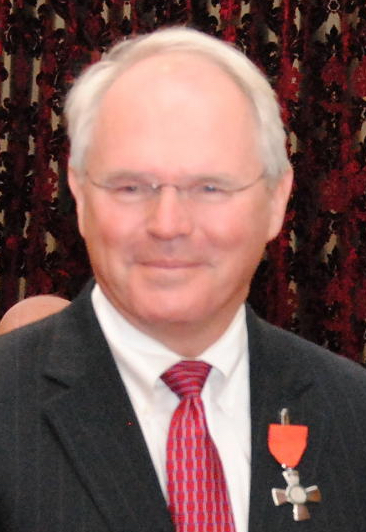
Christopher Hill

== Royal Victorian Order ==
=== Royal Victorian Medal (Silver) (RVM) ===
- Frances Anne McCaffery – principal attendant, Government House, Wellington.
- Marion Jennett Wortley – principal attendant, Government House, Wellington.
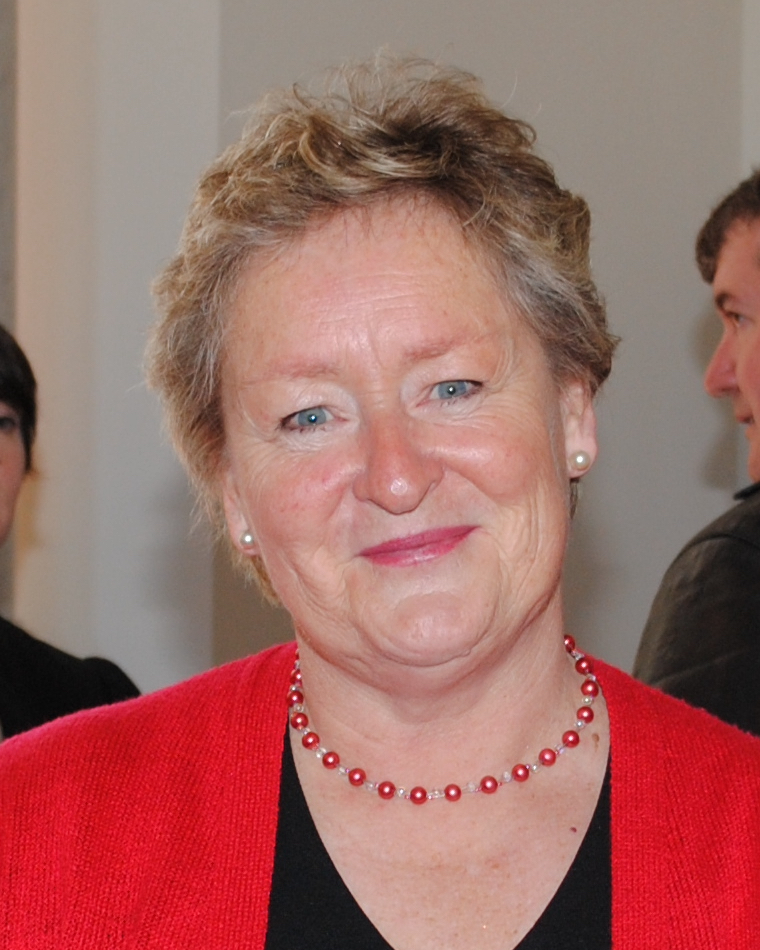
Marion Wortley

== Companion of the Queen's Service Order (QSO) ==
- Ross Malcolm Gordon – of Methven. For services to land search and rescue.
- The Honourable George Warren Hawkins – of Auckland. For services as a member of parliament.
- The Honourable Rodney Philip Hide – of Wellington. For services as a member of parliament.
- Dr The Honourable Wayne Daniel Mapp – of Auckland. For services as a member of parliament.
- Nicholas William Rogers – of Auckland. For services as a land damage assessor.
- Paula Mary Rose – of Upper Hutt. For services to the New Zealand Police and the community.

Honorary

- Dr Sjoerd van Ballegooy – of Papakura. For services to geotechnical science.
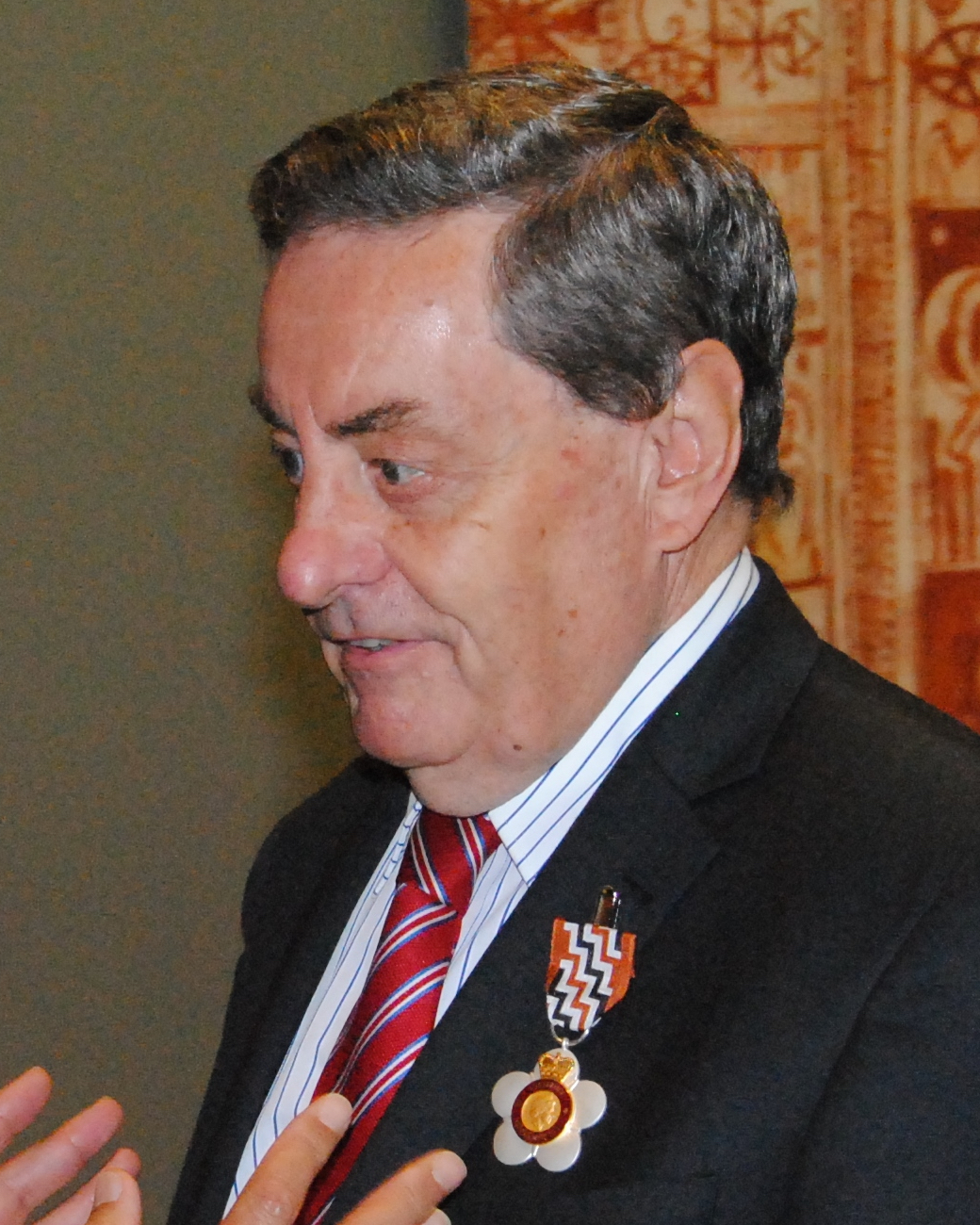
George Hawkins

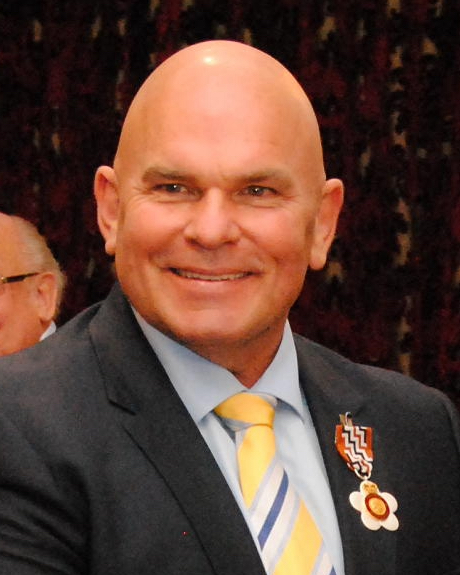
Rodney Hide

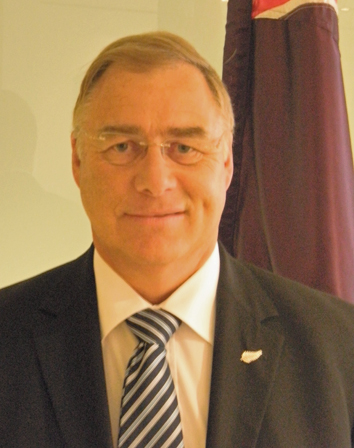
Wayne Mapp

== Queen's Service Medal (QSM) ==
- Brian Charles Adams – of Christchurch. For services to cricket.
- Noel Dawson Anderson – of Riverton. For services to the Coastguard.
- Michael Lynn Andrewes – of Dunedin. For services to opera.
- Ann Margaret Andrews – of Auckland. For services to the community.
- Raymond Baker – of Auckland. For services to the Jewish community and the racing industry.
- Georgia Lily Ball JP – of Auckland. For services to youth and the community.
- Mark Robert Ball JP – of Pukekohe. For services to the community.
- Warren David Barker – of Fairlie. For services to the community.
- William Patrick Bruce Benson – of Hastings. For services to art deco restoration and the community.
- Phillipa Avis Bishop – of Auckland. For services to the community.
- David Lindsay Blackwell – of Christchurch. For services to tennis.
- Lynette Bowe – of Taupō. For services to people with diabetes.
- Donald Vincent Brebner – of Tauranga. For services to the community.
- David Harold Broderick – of Himatangi Beach. For services to the community.
- Diane Barbara Broderick – of Himatangi Beach. For services to the community.
- Barry Lawrence Brook – of Palmerston North. For services as an entertainer.
- Peter John Bugler JP – of Picton. For services to cycling tourism.
- William Andrew Maxwell Burrill – of Auckland. For services to regional parks and conservation.
- Malcolm Duncan Cameron – of Dunedin. For services to youth and the community.
- Daphne Christophers – of Tauranga. For services to music.
- Shin-Kee Chung – of Christchurch. For services to the community.
- Frederick Charles Cooper – of Gore. For services to the community.
- Peter Thomas Cummings – of Lawrence. For services to agriculture and the community.
- Mavis Jessie Davidson – of Owaka. For services to the community.
- Chief Fire Officer Raymond Peter Dever – of Tolaga Bay. For services to the New Zealand Fire Service.
- Kenneth Robert Dorman – of Auckland. For services to television and the community.
- Maureen Teresa Fenton – of Hunterville. For services to the community.
- Harold Aitken Findlay – of Napier. For services to cricket.
- Peter Bell Gibson JP – of Napier. For services to the community.
- Graham Henry Goss – of Wellington. For services to the community.
- Dianne Celine Gregory-Hunt – of Pitt Island. For services to the community.
- Ashwin Gulab – of Wellington. For services to the Indian community.
- John Gully – of Nelson. For services to New Zealand–Nepal relations.
- Giri Raj Gupta – of Auckland. For services to business and the Indian community.
- Miyoko Hammersley – of Rotorua. For services as a hospital chaplain.
- Gwendoline Irene Harding – of Tauranga. For services to the community.
- Stewart Harvey – of Dunedin. For services to heritage preservation.
- Margaret Ann Hickey – of Ōpunake. For services to the community.
- Michael Eden Jacka – of Christchurch. For services as a geotechnical engineer.
- Mileva Jankovich – of Auckland. For services to refugees.
- Parbhu Kanji – of Auckland. For services to cricket and the Indian community.
- David Alan Lea JP – of Pahiatua. For services to the community.
- chief fire officerIan Moffat Lindsay – of Winton. For services to the New Zealand Fire Service.
- chief fire officerRobert James Lunn – of Greymouth. For services to the New Zealand Fire Service.
- Gregory Shane Makutu – of Sydney, Australia. For services to the Māori community and veterans.
- Maitland Ross Manning JP – of Ōtāne. For services to the community.
- June Dorothy Mills – of Dunedin. For services to the community.
- Senior Constable Bruce Milne – of Matamata. For services to the New Zealand Police and the community.
- Rhondda Olive Moffitt – of Christchurch. For services to sport and the community.
- Shona Marjory Murray – of Wellington. For services to music and education.
- Anand Naidu – of Auckland. For services to the Indian community.
- Senior Constable John Joseph O'Donovan – of Nelson. For services to the New Zealand Police and the community.
- Father Aprem Oraha Pithyou – of Wellington. For services to the Assyrian community.
- Patricia Dawn Porter – of Ngatea. For services to the community.
- Jenifer Maud Prattley – of Kaiapoi. For services to the Royal New Zealand Society for the Prevention of Cruelty to Animals.
- Ian Peters Gladstone Roche – of Dunedin. For services to lawn bowls.
- Keith Clifford Scholes – of Gisborne. For services to athletics.
- Barry Noel Searle – of Dargaville. For services to marine conservation.
- Diane Louise Sharpe JP – of Hamilton. For services to the community.
- Herakwal Paul Singh Bains JP – of Cambridge. For services to the Indian community.
- Barbara Jean Stone – of Papakura. For services to the community.
- George Sue JP – of Levin. For services to the community.
- Senior Constable John Thomas Tangaere – of Hastings. For services to Māori.
- Jonathan Harold Tanner – of Hamilton. For services to hockey.
- Patrick Wikiriwhi Thompson – of Auckland. For services to Māori and the deaf community.
- Barbara Frances Thomson – of Whangārei. For services to the performing arts.
- Lynette Merle Thornton – of Auckland. For services to the community.
- Krystyna Tomaszyk – of Wellington. For services to the community.
- Terence Tuanui JP – of Chatham Islands. For services to the community.
- Helen Ethel Walker – of Waipukurau. For services to the community.
- Susan Moya Westwood – of Whanganui. For services to the community.
- George Ronald Wheeler – of Auckland. For services to veterans.
- Asantha Peter Wijeyeratne – of Lower Hutt. For services to business and the community.
- John Edward Wilce – of Porirua. For services to golf and the community.
- Catherine Mayann Williams – of Auckland. For services as a geotechnical engineer.
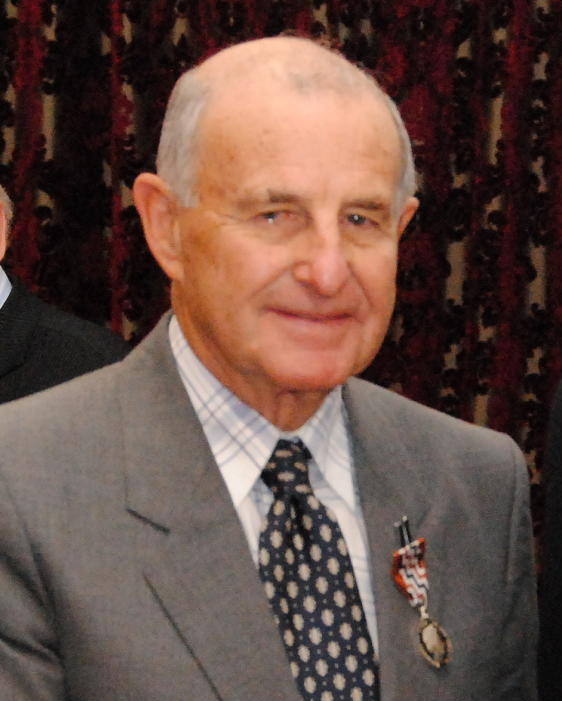
Brian Adams

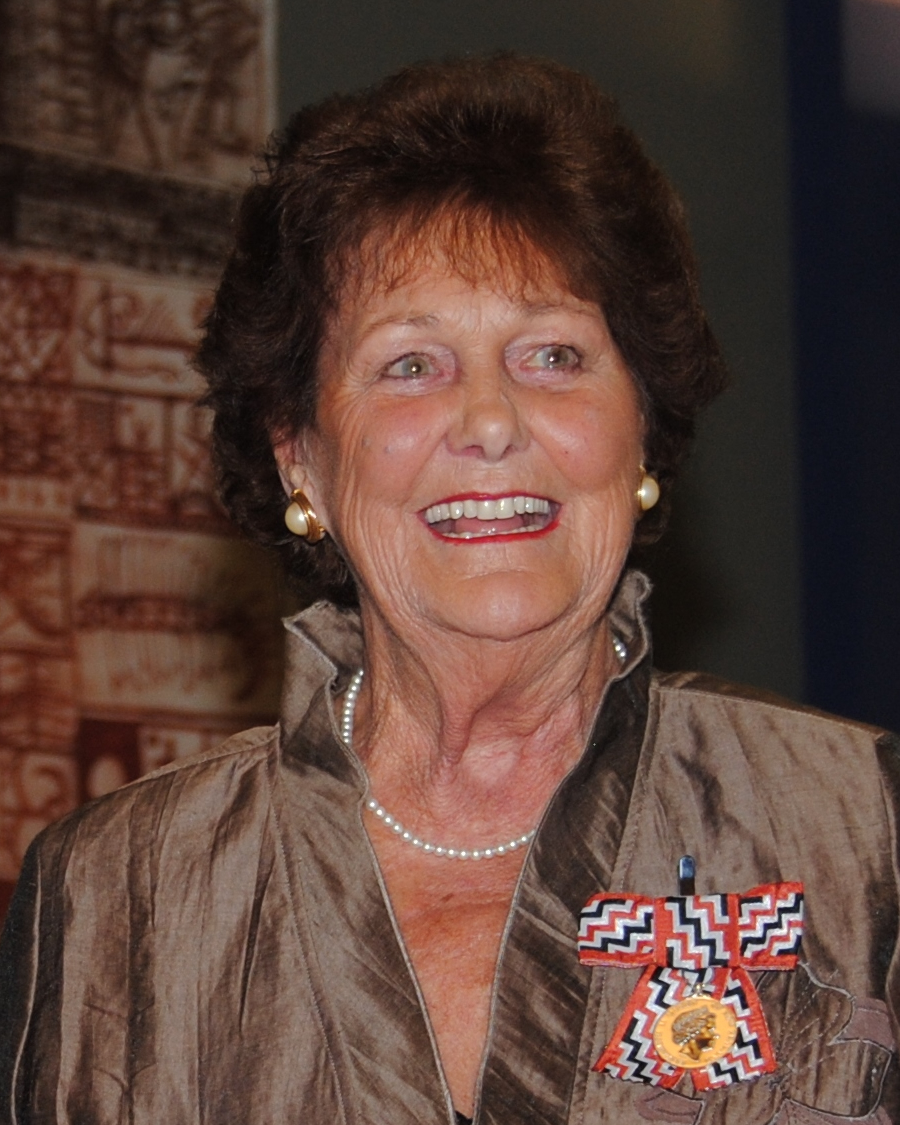
Georgia Ball

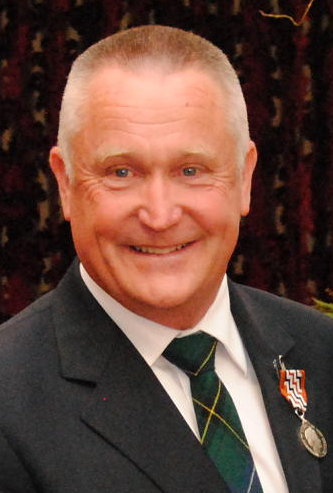
Mark Ball

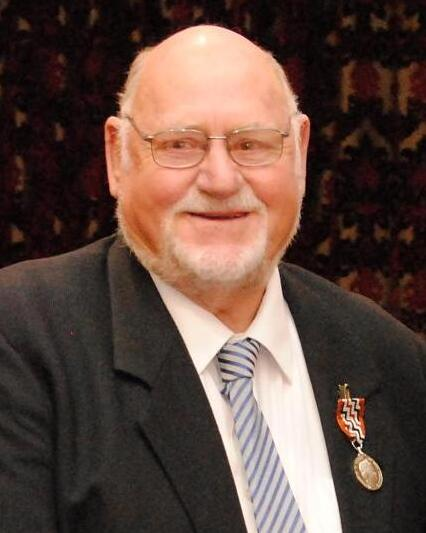
Warren Barker

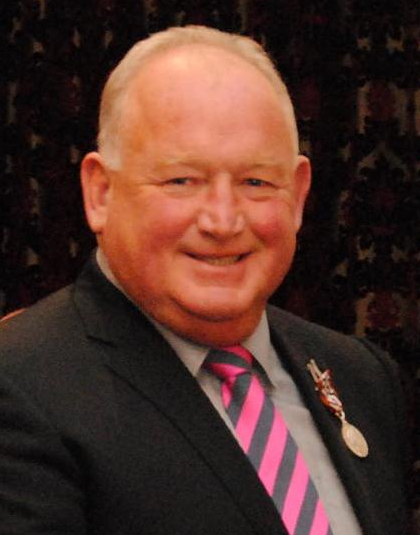
Pat Benson

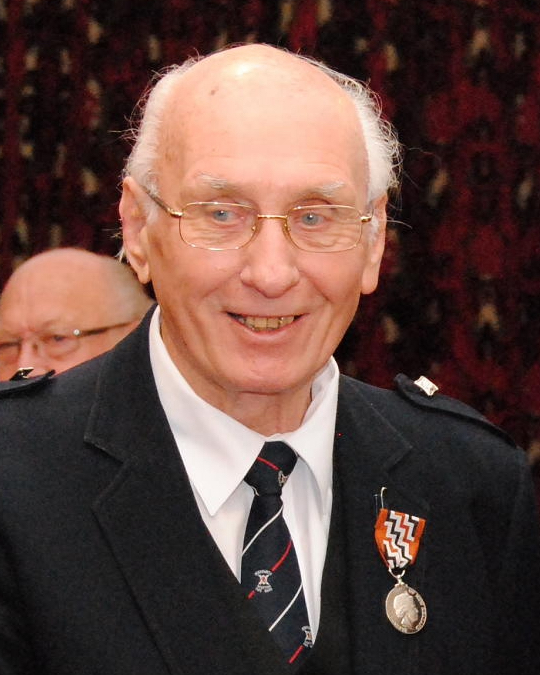
Barry Brook

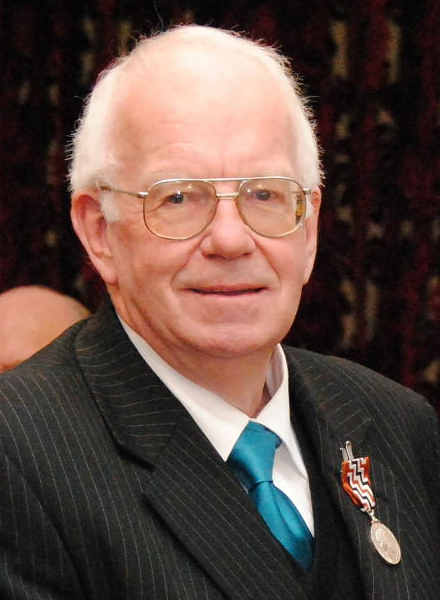
Malcolm Cameron

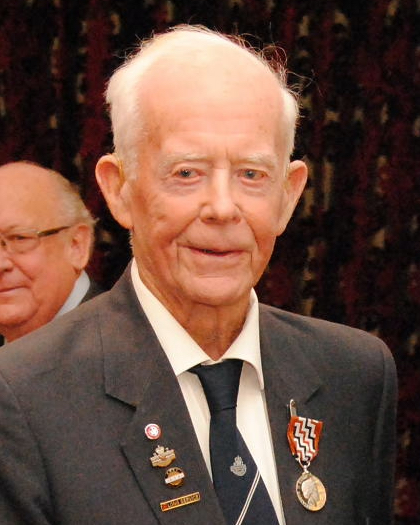
Fred Cooper

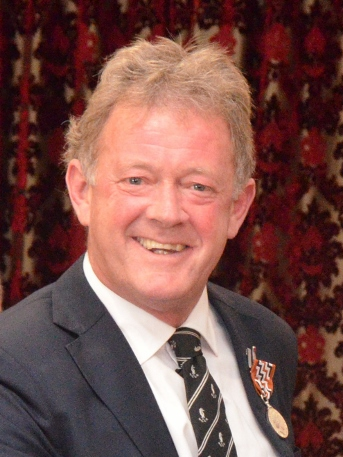
John Gully

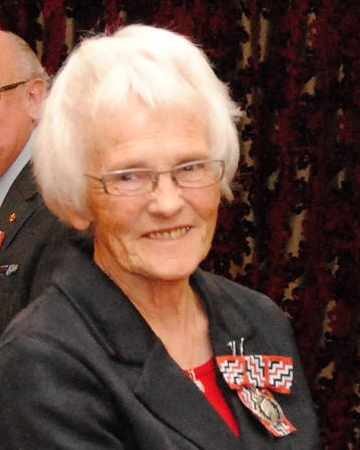
Ann Hickey

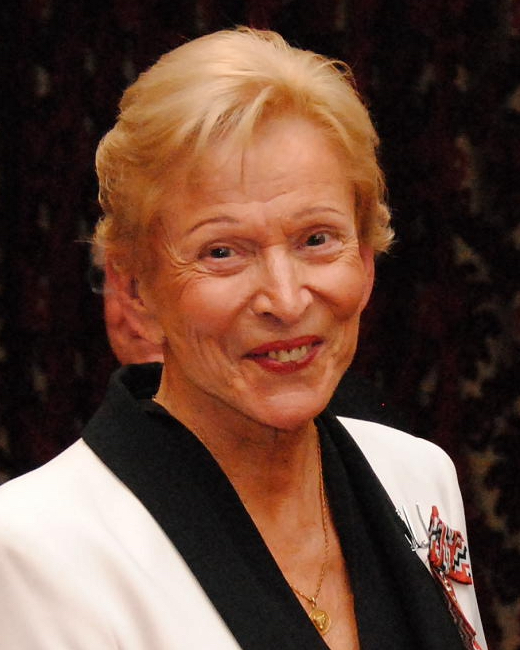
Krystyna Tomaszyk

== New Zealand Distinguished Service Decoration (DSD) ==
- Lance Corporal Anatoliy Valerievich Derepa – of Auckland. For services to the New Zealand Defence Force.
- Group Captain Athol James Forrest MNZM – of Port Moresby, Papua New Guinea. For services to the New Zealand Defence Force.
- Lieutenant Arthur Jordan Gale – of Palmerston North. For services to the New Zealand Defence Force.
- Major Shane Ruane – of Upper Hutt. For services to the New Zealand Defence Force.
- Lieutenant Colonel Brent Lockwood Wellington – of Upper Hutt. For services to the New Zealand Defence Force.
