= Krystyna Tomaszyk =

Polish-New Zealander writer and activist (1932–2020)

Krystyna Tomaszyk QSM
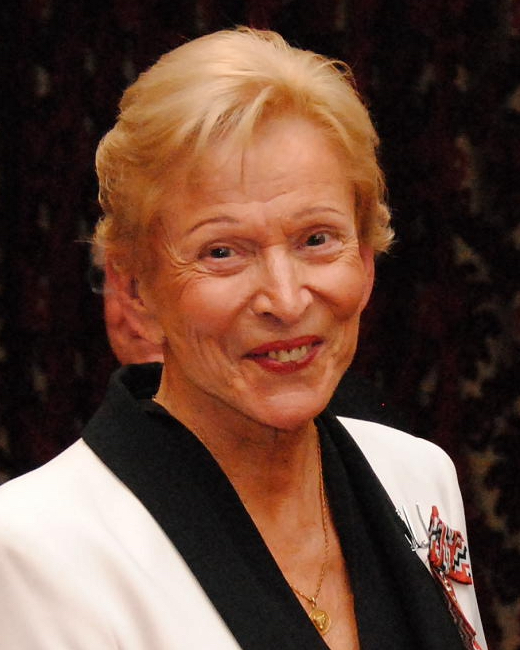
- Tomaczyk in 2013
- Born: Krystyna Stanisława Skwarko; 7 May 1932; Wilno, Poland
- Died: 13 June 2020 (aged 88); Wellington, New Zealand
- Occupations: Writer, social activist
- Partner: Czesław Tomaszyk
- Children: 2

Krystyna Stanisława Tomaszyk QSM (née Skwarko; 7 May 1932 – 13 June 2020) was a Polish-New Zealand writer and social activist.

== Biography ==
Tomaszyk came from the family of judge Stanisław Skwarka. With her mother Krystyna Skwarko and her brother, she was taken from Sokółka to Krasnoyarsk. Then she went with the Anders' Army to Iran, and in 1944, together with a group of Polish orphans, to New Zealand. Her mother ran Polish orphanages in Isfahan and New Zealand.

Tomaszyk graduated in psychology from Victoria University of Wellington. She worked, among others with the Department of Maori Affairs, Child Welfare in Rotorua, the Intellectually Disabled Organization, as a social affairs adviser to the Hamilton City Council, the Regional Disciplinary Committee of Physicians. She was a teacher, a volunteer in Khalighat - at the Death House of Mother Teresa in Calcutta, a writer, translator, editor and publisher of the monthly "Contact".

As part of the Polish community activity, Tomaszyk promoted the history of children from Pahiatua. She was also the president of the Polish Women's Circle at the Polish House in Wellington. Involved in New Zealand's social and political life. She was member of the New Zealand Institute of International Affairs.

Tomaszyk was the author of the biography "Essence" (2004), which she translated into Polish ("Road and memory. Through Siberia to the Antipodes", 2009).

She was a citizen of Poland and New Zealand. In 1952, she married Czesław Tomaszyk, a soldier of the Polish Underground State. They had two children, Janina and Krzysztof. After her death, Tomaszyk was cremated.

== Honours and awards ==
In the 2013 New Year Honours, Tomaszyk received the Queen's Service Medal, for services to the community. In 2018, she was awarded the Commander's Cross of the Order of Merit of the Republic of Poland by Polish president Andrzej Duda, for "outstanding services in activities for the Polish community in New Zealand, for popularizing Polish culture and history, for activities to promote Polishness and shaping patriotic attitudes". She was also the recipient of a Waikato Woman of the Year title from the Plunket Society in Hamilton.

== Selected works ==
- Kristine Tomaszyk: Refugee resettlement and wellbeing : based on the first National Conference on Refugee Mental Health at Wellington, *New Zealand, 12–15 May 1988. Max Abbott (red.). Auckland: Mental Health Found. of New Zealand, 1988, s. 353. ISBN 0-908727-80-1.
- Kristine Tomaszyk: But a fleeting moment : meditations on the reality and the mystery of being : [poems]. Wellington: K. Tomaszyk, *1997, s. 96. ISBN 0-473-04629-6.
- Kristine Tomaszyk: Essence. Palmerston North: Dunmore Press, 2004, s. 235. ISBN 0-86469-475-X.
- Krystyna Tomaszyk: Droga i pamięć : przez Syberię na Antypody. Warszawa: Wydawnictwo Trio, 2009, s. 260. ISBN 978-83-7436-206-1.
- Krystyna Tomaszyk: Polskie dzieci w Isfahanie. Wellington: Krystyna Krystine Tomaszyk, 2017, s. 76.
