= Sally Morrison (philanthropist) =

New Zealand businesswoman and philanthropist

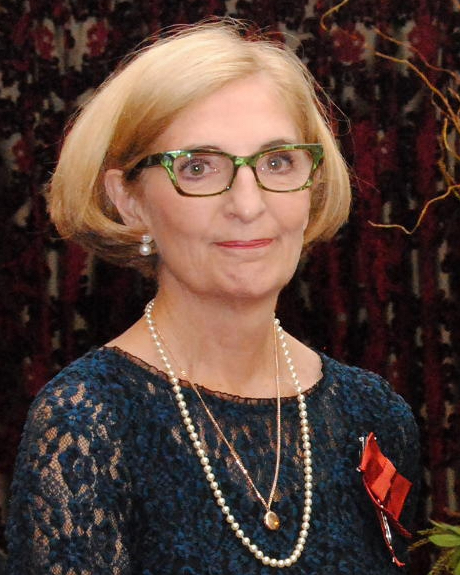
Morrison in 2013

Sally Christine Morrison MNZM is a New Zealand businesswoman and philanthropist. Starting in the late 1990s, she volunteered at, and co-ordinated support for, a leprosy hospital in Vietnam.

== Biography ==
Morrison trained as a nurse and moved to Tauranga in 1977. In 1980 she established a private hospital and rest home there, Oakland Health. In the late 1990s she visited Vietnam with her daughter and met the aunt of an acquaintance, Sister Sheila O'Toole, who ran a centre for leprosy patients. On returning to New Zealand, Morrison began to collect donations of goods and funds to support the work of the centre. She underwent training in order to teach the centre staff how to care for the leprosy patients, and went back to Vietnam seven times over the next 14 years to run training programmes.

Morrison has held positions as the chair of charity Acorn Foundation, a trustee of Bay of Plenty Cricket and on the board of the Private Hospitals Association. In 2007 she sold Oakland Health.

In the 2013 New Year Honours, Morrison was appointed a Member of the New Zealand Order of Merit, for services to health and the community.

In 2016 Morrison sold her large waterside property in Tauranga and moved into a penthouse apartment. She sold more than 40 pieces of excess furniture at auction with all proceeds going to a global polio immunisation campaign run by Rotary International.
