= Timeline of the COVID-19 pandemic in New Zealand =

Timeline of the COVID-19 pandemic in New Zealand may refer to:

- Timeline of the COVID-19 pandemic in New Zealand (2020)
- Timeline of the COVID-19 pandemic in New Zealand (2021)
- Timeline of the COVID-19 pandemic in New Zealand (2022)
- Timeline of the COVID-19 pandemic in New Zealand (2023)
- Timeline of the COVID-19 pandemic in New Zealand (2024)
