= Timeline of the COVID-19 pandemic in New Zealand (2024) =

The following is a timeline of the COVID-19 pandemic in New Zealand during 2024.

== Transmission timeline ==
Data about the previous day is extracted from the Institute of Environmental Science and Research's database at 9:00 am weekly and is publicly released by the Ministry of Health around 1:00 pm on Monday weekly.

=== January ===
Date	Cases		Reinfections		Recoveries		Deaths		Sources
Date	New	Total	New	Total	New	Total	New	Total	Sources
8	6,558	2,554,013	3,999	312,051	6,258	2,543,814	22	3,645	
15	8,040	2,562,053	4,992	317,043	6,497	2,550,311	77	3,722	
22	7,019	2,569,056	4,361	321,400	8,031	2,558,342	26	3,748	
29	5,757	2,574,813	3,609	325,010	6,951	2,565,293	20	3,768	

On 12 January, epidemiologist Dr Michael Baker reported that the fifth wave of COVID-19 had seen a surge in cases over the 2023–2024 summer holiday period. The new Omicron subvariant JN.1 was the fastest growing variant, accounting for 14% of sequenced cases in the week leading up to 15 December 2023. As of 7 January, there were 355 COVID-19 patients in hospital and six in intensive care.

On 15 January, 324 COVID-19 patients were hospitalised with six being in intensive care.

On 23 January, 343 patients were in hospital while the seven-day rolling average was 995.

On 26 January, the Institute of Environmental Science and Research (ESR) reported that COVID-19 wastewater figures had declined over the past two weeks leading up to 21 January. During the first week of January, COVID-19 wastewater figures had averaged 8.46 million genome copies per person per day (GC/p/d). By 21 January, this had declined to 3.76 million GC/p/d.

On 29 January, 258 cases were reported in hospital.

On 31 January, Health Minister Dr Shane Reti extended the Government's provision of free COVID-19 rapid antigen tests to late June 2024.

=== February ===
Date	Cases		Reinfections		Recoveries		Deaths		Sources
Date	New	Total	New	Total	New	Total	New	Total	Sources
5	5,555	2,580,365	3,555	328,562	5,739	2,571,032	20	3,788	
12	5,878	2,586,241	3,807	332,269	5,539	2,576,571	15	3,803	
19	6,312	2,592,549	4,077	336,444	5,855	2,582,426	14	3,817	
26	6,084	2,598,630	3,935	340,378	6,592	2,588,718	20	3,837	

On 2 February, Internal Affairs Minister Brooke Van Velden confirmed that the Government would expand the scope of the Royal Commission of Inquiry into COVID-19 Lessons Learned. Public consultation on the expanded topics is expected to commence later in the month.

On 5 February, Rangiora High School closed for one day after 30 staff members tested positive for COVID-19.

On 12 February, there were 245 cases in hospital. There was a seven day rolling average of 838 per day.

On 19 February, there were 205 case in hospital. There was a seven day rolling average of 901 per day.

On 21 February, Radio New Zealand reported that wastewater testing by the Institute of Environmental Science and Research (ESR) had shown that the level of the COVID-19 virus in wastewater had risen for three weeks in a row. COVID-19 modeller Michael Plank suggested the spike was linked to people returning to school and work after the school holidays.

=== March ===
Date	Cases		Reinfections		Recoveries		Deaths		Sources
Date	New	Total	New	Total	New	Total	New	Total	Sources
4	5,575	2,604,202	3,597	343,973	6,057	2,594,775	21	3,858	
11	4,803	2,609,005	3,118	347,091	5,550	2,600,325	24	3,882	
18	4,666	2,613,670	3,012	350,103	4,777	2,613,670	20	3,902	
25	4,042	2,617,772	2,535	352,638	4,653	2,609,755	14	3,916	

On 4 March, Te Whatu Ora (Health New Zealand) issued an advisory that household contacts of COVID-19 positive individuals no longer needed to test daily unless they developed COVID-19 symptoms. There were 164 new cases with a seven-day rolling average of 796 per day.

On 7 March, a new COVID-19 vaccine, capable of dealing with newer strains, was released.

On 11 March, there were 171 cases in hospital with a seven day rolling average of 686 per day.

On 18 March, there were 55 cases in hospital with a seven day rolling average of 667 per day.

=== April ===
Date	Cases		Reinfections		Recoveries		Deaths		Sources
Date	New	Total	New	Total	New	Total	New	Total	Sources
1	3,399	2,621,111	2,068	354,706	4,076	2,613,791	7	3,923	
8	3,385	2,624,496	2,109	356,816	3,391	2,617,182	13	3,936	
15	2,618	2,627,114	1,634	358,450	3,370	2,620,552	8	3,944	
23	2,383	2,629,496	1,490	359,939	2,602	2,623,154	21	3,965	
29	2,343	2,631,839	1,445	361,385	2,369	2,625,523	11	3,976	

On 2 April, there were 168 cases in hospital. Regions with the highest number of COVID-19 cases were the Canterbury Region, Capital and Coast, Waikato and Auckland Region.

On 8 April, there were 145 cases in hospital. Regions with the highest number of COVID-19 cases were Canterbury, Waitematā, Capital and Coast and Counties Manukau.

On 15 April, there were 152 cases in hospital with a seven day rolling average of 374 per day. In mid-April 2024, the University of Washington's latest Global Burden of Disease study reported that the all-age mortality rate between 2020 and 2021 was negative in New Zealand and six other countries including Taiwan, Mongolia, Japan, Iceland, Antigua and Barbuda, and Barbados. In 2021, New Zealand and Barbados were the only two countries with negative excess mortality. University of Otago epidemiologist Professor Michael Baker attributed the country's negative excess mortality rate to its elimination strategy during that period, which kept Covid numbers down until vaccines became widely available. In 2022, the death toll rose by 10.2% compared with the previous year due to the relaxation of pandemic restrictions and the concurrent outbreak of the Omicron variant. By 2024, nearly 6,000 New Zealanders had died with COVID-19.

On 23 April, there were 167 cases reported in hospital as of midnight 21 April. The seven-day rolling average was 340 per day. Canterbury and Waitematā had the highest number of infections, reporting 398 and 232 cases respectively.

On 29 April, there were 159 cases reported in hospital. The seven-day rolling average was 335 per day. Canterbury and Capital and Coast had the highest number of infections, reporting 399 and 217 respectively.

=== May ===
Date	Cases		Reinfections		Recoveries		Deaths		Sources
Date	New	Total	New	Total	New	Total	New	Total	Sources
6	2,287	2,634,126	1,379	362,765	2,322	2,627,845	19	3,995	
13	3,738	2,593,269	2,470	365,236	2,854	2,630,699	13	4,008	
20	6,146	2,643,385	3,916	368,645	3,324	2,634,023	19	4,027	
27	6,636	2,650,021	4,338	372,983	5,328	2,639,351	7	4,034	

On 6 May, 116 cases were reported in hospital on midnight 5 May. The seven-day rolling average was 327 per day.

On 27 May, epidemiologist Professor Michael Baker said that New Zealand was experiencing its highest peak in COVID-19 cases since December 2022, citing a 3,922 increase in the number of cases reported the previous week based on wastewater testing. He also estimated that 35 people were going to hospital with COVID-19. 282 cases were reported in hospital as of midnight 26 May, with a seven-day rolling average of 948.

=== June ===
Date	Cases		Reinfections		Recoveries		Deaths		Sources
Date	New	Total	New	Total	New	Total	New	Total	Sources
4	6,142	2,656,205	3,458	377,091	3,985	2,647,479	1	4,063	
11	5,230	2,660,367	3,429	379,782	6,401	2,651,554	20	4,083	
17	4,788	2,663,926	3,021	382,057	4,692	2,656,246	37	4,120	
24	8,943	2,672,869	5,389	387,446	8,908	2,665,154	25	4,145	

On 4 June, 314 cases were reported in hospital. Canterbury reported 738 cases, followed by 552 in Capital and Coast, 518 in Auckland, 485 in Waitematā, 376 in Waikato and 359 in Counties Manukau.

On 11 June, 354 cases were reported in hospital, with none in intensive care. The seven-day rolling average was 676.

On 17 June, 279 cases were reported in hospital while the seven day rolling average was 509. Of the 37 deaths, nine were from Auckland, eight from Wellingon, four from Waikato, four from the Canterbury Region, four from the Southern Region, two from the Lakes District, two from Nelson-Marlborough, one from the Gisborne District, one from South Canterbury. 15 of the deceased were in their 80s, nine in their 70s, three in their 60s, two in their 50s and one in their 20s.

On 24 June, 241 cases were reported in hospital while the seven day rolling average was 510.

On 25 June, Internal Affairs Minister Brooke Van Velden announced that the second phase of the Royal Commission of Inquiry into COVID-19 Lessons Learned would explore vaccine efficacy and safety, the use of vaccine mandates, the extent of disruption caused by the Government's pandemic response to New Zealanders' health, education and business, the extended lockdowns in Auckland and Northland, the utilisation of partnerships with business and professional groups, and the utilisation of new technology, methods, and effective international practices. The second phase is expected to begin in November 2024 and is expected to deliver its final recommendations by February 2025.

On 29 June, Te Whatu Ora/Health New Zealand announced that people over the age of 14 years would have to pay for COVID-related visits to the general practitioner. Health NZ living well director Dr Martin Hefford confirmed that some funded services would remain available in order to help with the management of COVID-19 during the winter months. COVID-19 vaccines and anti-virals will remain free for those who qualify.

=== July ===
Date	Cases		Reinfections		Recoveries		Deaths		Sources
Date	New	Total	New	Total	New	Total	New	Total	Sources
1	3,657	2,676,526	2,158	389,604	4,107	2,669,261	40	4,185	
8	2,772	2,679,297	1,686	391,290	3,050	2,672,311	31	4,216	
15	2,640	2,681,574	1,617	392,695	2,722	2,675,033	30	4,246	
22	2,414	2,683,663	1,429	393,942	2,276	2,677,309	22	4,268	
29	1,761	2,685,424	1,069	395,011	2,083	2,679,392	16	4,284	

On 1 July, the Ministry of Health confirmed that the dedicated COVID-19 Healthline and doctors' services would be discontinued. In addition, Health New Zealand reported there were 208 cases in hospital.

On 4 July, Health New Zealand announced that COVID-19 sick leave for health workers including doctors and nurses would be scrapped from 14 July 2024.

On 7 July, Health New Zealand confirmed that expired COVID-19 personal protective equipment and rapid antigen tests would be processed into alternative fuels or recycled.

On 8 July, an outbreak at a Summerset retirement village in Wellington led to 23 residents contracting COVID-19. That same day, 173 cases were reported in hospital. Te Whatu Ora also acknowledged that an error with reported Covid cases and related hospital admissions, covering the period 27 May to 23 June, led to an undercount in COVID-19 cases being published on 24 June.

On 15 July, 169 cases were reported in hospital with none in intensive care. The Canterbury Region reported the highest number of cases (320), followed by Waitematā (264), and Counties Manukau (252).

On 22 July, 162 cases were reported in hospital with none in intensive care. The highest number of cases were reported in Canterbury, Waitematā and Counties Manukau.

On 30 July, 134 cases were reported in hospital with none in intensive care. The highest number of cases were reported in Canterbury, Waitematā and Counties Manukau.

=== August ===
Date	Cases		Reinfections		Recoveries		Deaths		Sources
Date	New	Total	New	Total	New	Total	New	Total	Sources
5	2,003	2,686,914	1,201	395,901	1,735	2,681,127	15	4,299	
12	1,666	2,688,579	1,008	396,909	1,464	2,682,591	26	4,325	
19	1,693	2,690,062	1,058	397,837	1,635	2,684,226	28	4,353	
26	1,294	2,691,355	795	398,632	1,461	2,685,687	31	4,384	

On 5 August, 126 cases were reported in hospital, with none in intensive care. Canterbury and Waitemata reported the highest number of cases.

On 12 August, 93 cases were reported in hospital, with none in intensive care. Canterbury and Waitemata reported the highest number of cases.

On 19 August, 102 cases were reported in hospital, with none in intensive care. Canterbury and Waitemata reported the highest number of cases.

On 26 August, 115 cases were reported in hospital, with none in intensive care. Canterbury and Waitemata reported the highest number of cases.

On 27 August, the government announced a new chair and commissioners for the second phase of the Royal Commission of Inquiry into COVID-19 Lessons Learned. Litigation specialist Grant Illingworth KC was appointed chair, asked to focus on government decisions in 2021 and 2022 about vaccine efficacy and lockdowns. The government also appointed public and economic policy professional Judy Kavanagh, and barrister Anthony Hill, who is a former health and disability commissioner. They were to replace the chair of phase 1 of the Inquiry, epidemiologist Professor Tony Blakely, and commissioner John Whitehead, from the conclusion of phase 1 on 28 November 2024.

=== September ===
Date	Cases		Reinfections		Recoveries		Deaths		Sources
Date	New	Total	New	Total	New	Total	New	Total	Sources
2	1,425	2,692,547	900	399,386	1,266	2,686,953	19	4,403	
9	1,041	2,693,497	676	400,014	1,175	2,688,128	18	4,421	
16	728	2,694,224	481	400,495	945	2,689,073	3	4,424	
23	1,012	2,695,000	641	400,989	725	2,689,798	2	4,426	
30	859	2,695,906	859	401,571	772	2,689,798	4	4,430	

On 2 September, there were 92 people in hospital, with none in intensive care. Waitemata reported the highest number of cases (266), followed by Canterbury (201).

On 6 September, the New Zealand Medical Journal published a study of 5.2m vaccinations in New Zealand, which reported that local vaccine effectiveness against COVID-19 hospitalisation was 69.6% (95% CI: 50.1–81.5) in the 1st month after vaccination and increased to 88.5% (95% CI: 80.6–93.1) in the 2nd month. Against death, there was sustained protection over the follow-up period, with effectiveness of 87.6% (95% CI: 38.9–97.5).

On 10 September, there were 82 people in hospital, with none in intensive care. Waitemata reported the highest number of cases (152), followed by Canterbury 99).

On 19 September, Radio New Zealand reported a marked decline in the number of reported cases (728) and deaths (3) compared to the past week. 64 COVID-19 positive people were in hospital as of midnight 15 September.

=== October ===
Date	Cases		Reinfections		Recoveries		Deaths		Sources
Date	New	Total	New	Total	New	Total	New	Total	Sources
7	1,174	2,696,787	759	402,144	901	2,691,471	5	4,435	
14	887	2,697,674	577	402,770	879	2,692,350	2	4,437	
21	917	2,698,591	604	403,325	882	2,693,232	5	4,442	
28	889	2,699,661	587	404,080	1,091	2,694,323	7	4,449	

From 1 October, COVID-19 rapid antigen tests will cease to be provided for free. By 5 October, a single RAT test cost NZ$4 while a pack of five RAT tests cost NZ$15. University of Otago epidemiologist Dr Michael Baker expressed concerns that removing free RAT tests would lead to reduced COVID-19 testing and diagnosis among lower-income communities particularly Māori and Pasifika New Zealanders.

On 11 October, Radio New Zealand reported that the XEC sub-variant had arrived in New Zealand.

On 15 October, 89 COVID-19 cases were reported in hospital.

On 27 October, University of Otago epidemiologist Michael Baker warned that a summer wave of COVID-19 could lead to an increase in infections and deaths.

On 29 October, 106 COVID-19 cases were reported in hospital. The Canterbury Region reported the highest number of cases, followed by the Auckland Region.

=== November ===
Date	Cases		Reinfections		Recoveries		Deaths		Sources
Date	New	Total	New	Total	New	Total	New	Total	Sources
5	1,248	2,700,909	826	404,906	880	2,695,203	12	4,461	
12	1,431	2,702,340	995	405,901	1,238	2,696,441	7	4,468	
18	1,411	2,703,468	947	406,646	1,388	2,697,588	4	4,470	
25	1,675	2,705,143	1,101	407,747	1,403	2,698,991	6	4,476	

On 5 November, 77 COVID-19 cases were reported in hospital.

On 14 November, 85 cases were reported in hospital. The highest number of cases were reported in Capital and Coast, Canterbury and Waitemata.

On 19 November, 76 cases were reported in hospital.

On 26 November, 83 cases were reported in hospital. The seven day rolling average was 239 per day. On 28 November, the Government released the report into the first phase of the Royal Commission of Inquiry into COVID-19 Lessons Learned.

=== December ===
Date	Cases		Reinfections		Recoveries		Deaths		Sources
Date	New	Total	New	Total	New	Total	New	Total	Sources
2	1,719	2,706,862	1,126	408,873	1,669	2,700,660	7	4,483	
9	1,631	2,708,493	1,077	409,950	1,735	2,702,395	6	4,489	
16	1,402	2,709,895	937	410,887	1,847	2,704,242	8	4,497	

On 3 December, 107 cases were reported in hospital. The seven day rolling average was 246 cases per day.

On 9 December, there were 144 cases in hospital. By midnight 15 December, this figure had dropped to 85 cases.
