= Timeline of the COVID-19 pandemic in New Zealand (2023) =

The following is a timeline of the COVID-19 pandemic in New Zealand during 2023.

== Transmission timeline ==
Data about the previous day is extracted from the Institute of Environmental Science and Research's database at 9:00 am weekly and is publicly released by the Ministry of Health around 1:00 pm on Monday weekly.

=== January ===
Date	Cases		Reinfections		Recoveries		Deaths		Sources
Date	New	Total	New	Total	New	Total	New	Total	Sources
4	22,770	2,117,094	6,961	113,274	31,968	2,092,041	0	2,331	
9	21,685	2,138,754	8,609	121,879	22,677	2,114,718	62	2,393	
16	19,215	2,157,933	7,795	129,660	21,615	2,136,333	44	2,437	
23	13,880	2,171,788	5,357	135,003	19,138	2,155,471	31	2,468	
30	10,589	2,182,355	4,293	139,285	13,849	2,169,320	9	2,477	

On 9 January, the Health Ministry confirmed that the XBB.1.5 variant of COVID-19 had been detected in New Zealand with two cases. There were 2,424 new community cases on 9 January, compared to over 4,000 reported on 4 January.

On 16 January, 1News reported that a child aged 10 years and an individual aged between 10 and 19 years were among the 57 deaths reported between 9 and 15 January. 333 COVID-19 cases were hospitalised with eight in intensive care.

=== February ===
Date	Cases		Reinfections		Recoveries		Deaths		Sources
Date	New	Total	New	Total	New	Total	New	Total	Sources
7	8,882	2,191,215	3,594	142,866	10,556	2,179,876	25	2,502	
13	8,396	2,199,579	3,508	146,400	9,155	2,189,301	11	2,513	
20	8,220	2,207,775	3,429	149,832	8,092	2,197,123	21	2,534	
27	9,100	2,216,852	3,813	153,645	8,231	2,205,354	8	2,542	

On 9 February, Medsafe approved a version of Pfizer's pediatric vaccine for children aged under the age of five years.

On 20 February, Statistics New Zealand confirmed that COVID-19 had caused a 10 percent surge in the death toll in 2022. The 2022 death toll in New Zealand stood at 38,574; compared with 34,932 in 2021. Of these deaths, 2,400 deaths in 2022 were attributed to COVID-19. Statistics NZ population estimates and projections manager Michael MacAskill also stated that the increased death toll in 2022 reflected New Zealand's ageing population, following similar trends in Canada, the United Kingdom, and United States.

On 27 February, the Ministry of Health confirmed there had been 40 COVID-related deaths over the past week including one person under the age of 10 and one person in their 20s. 200 COVID-19 cases remained in hospital including three in intensive care.

=== March ===
Date	Cases		Reinfections		Recoveries		Deaths		Sources
Date	New	Total	New	Total	New	Total	New	Total	Sources
6	11,453	2,228,291	4,811	158,450	8,962	2,214,316	6	2,548	
13	11,544	2,239,800	4,717	163,152	11,417	2,225,733	12	2,560	
20	11,171	2,250,952	4,630	167,768	11,483	2,237,216	26	2,586	
27	11,258	2,262,186	22,180	172,467	11,071	2,248,287	76	2,662	

On 6 March, the Canterbury Region reported the highest number of cases in New Zealand, with 2,346 in the past week. The Southern District came second, reporting 1,251 in the past week. The Waitemata District came third place, reporting 1,197 cases in the past week. 177 cases remained hospitalised, with one patient in intensive care. Of the 18 deaths reported in the past week, one was aged under 10 years while another was in their 20s.

On 13 March, 190 cases were hospitalised with five in intensive care units. The rolling seven-day average for new cases between 6 and 12 March was 1,644, compared with 1,632 reported in the week leading up to 6 March That same day, National Party leader and Leader of the Opposition Christopher Luxon tested positive for COVID-19; having tested positive previously in 2022.

On 20 March, 200 cases were hospitalised with eight in intensive care units. The seven-day rolling average leading up to 20 March was 1,593.

On 27 March, 211 people were hospitalised with seven in intensive care units. The seven-day rolling average leading up to 27 March was 1,605.

=== April ===
Date	Cases		Reinfections		Recoveries		Deaths		Sources
Date	New	Total	New	Total	New	Total	New	Total	Sources
3	12,202	2,274,370	5,149	177,605	11,222	2,259,509	25	2,687	
11	12,129	2,286,481	4,973	182,567	12,173	2,271,682	8	2,695	
17	14,242	2,300,696	6,061	188,620	12,096	2,283,778	21	2,716	
24	12,383	2,313,064	5,334	193,945	14,189	2,297,967	20	2,736	

On 10 April, University of Otago epidemiologist Michael Baker urged the New Zealand Government to retain the few remaining COVID-19 restrictions including the mandatory seven-day isolation period for positive cases and mask wearing at hospitals.

On 11 April, Radio New Zealand reported that 219 COVID-19 patients remained in hospital as of midnight 9 April, with seven in intensive care. That same day, Prime Minister Chris Hipkins confirmed that the Government was considering scrapping the mandatory seven-day isolation period for COVID-19 positive cases. That same day, Hipkins and Minister of Health Ayesha Verrall confirmed that the Government would retain the few remaining COVID-19 restrictions such as the seven-day mandatory isolation period for positive cases and mask wearing requirements at hospitals for at least two months.

On 17 April, Radio New Zealand reported a surge in infections, reinfections, hospitalisations and deaths reported over the past week. In response, epidemiologist Baker stated that New Zealand was experiencing its fourth wave of COVID-19 infections and urged the public to take the new COVID-19 booster vaccine, isolate if they are infected, and wear facemasks in poorly ventilated environments.

On 24 April, Radio New Zealand reported that there were 292 patients in hospital and nine in intensive care. The highest number of active cases were in the Canterbury Region, Auckland, and the Southern District. University of Otago epidemiologist Peter McIntyre has urged the Government to focus on getting higher-risk individuals including the elderly, Māori, and Pasifika aged over 60 years double-boosted rather than focusing on infection control through mask wearing and improved ventilation.

=== May ===
Date	Cases		Reinfections		Recoveries		Deaths		Sources
Date	New	Total	New	Total	New	Total	New	Total	Sources
1	11,063	2,324,094	4,855	198,783	12,353	2,310,320	26	2,762	
8	12,277	2,336,352	5,740	204,511	11,019	2,321,339	30	2,792	
15	11,739	2,348,074	5,682	210,185	12,182	2,333,521	58	2,850	
22	14,657	2,362,225	6,716	217,020	12,580	2,346,101	43	2,893	
29	1,4371	2,375,191	6,880	223,227	12,275	2,358,376	49	2,942	

On 1 May, there were 265 people in hospital with eight in intensive care. Canterbury, Waitemata, Counties Manukau, and the Southern regions recorded the highest number of cases in New Zealand over the previous seven days.

On 8 May, there were 249 people in hospital with 12 in intensive care.

On 15 May, there were 247 people in hospital with six in intensive care.

On 22 May, there were 247 people in hospital with eight in intensive care. The seven day rolling average over the past week was 1,891. As part of the 2023 New Zealand budget, the Government allocated NZ$20 million to raise COVID-19 immunisation and screening coverage for both Māori and Pasifika New Zealanders.

On 29 May, there were 248 people in hospital with eight in intensive care. The seven day rolling average was 1,982.

=== June ===
Date	Cases		Reinfections		Recoveries		Deaths		Sources
Date	New	Total	New	Total	New	Total	New	Total	Sources
5	12,028	2,387,201	5,612	228,830	13,836	2,372,212	59	3,001	
12	9,883	2,397,065	4,722	233,539	11,960	2,384,172	37	3,038	
19	8,544	2,405,595	4,058	237,587	9,833	2,394,005	39	3,077	
26	7,702	2,413,279	3,616	241,193	8,485	2,402,490	40	3,117	

On 4 June, there were 278 people in hospital, with nine in intensive care. The seven day rolling average was 1,713 cases.

On 12 June, there were 228 people in hospital, with seven in intensive care. The seven day rolling average was 1,408 cases.

On 19 June, there were 246 cases in hospital, with six intensive care. The seven day rolling average was 1,217 cases.

On 26 June, two children under the age of 10 years were reported among the 36 deaths in the last week attributed to COVID-19. Of the other fatalities, one was in their 40s, three were in their 50s, four were in their 60s, seven were in their 70s, 13 were in their 80s, and six were in their 90s. 17 of the deceased were women and 19 were men. There were 181 cases in hospital, with five in intensive care. The seven day rolling average was 1,096 cases.

=== July ===
Date	Cases		Reinfections		Recoveries		Deaths		Sources
Date	New	Total	New	Total	New	Total	New	Total	Sources
3	6,578	2,419,839	3,173	244,356	7,681	2,410,171	21	3,138	
10	5,417	2,425,237	2,547	246,890	6,511	2,416,682	21	3,159	
17	4,332	2,429,544	2,048	248,923	5,387	2,422,069	13	3,172	
24	3,764	2,433,293	1,844	250,758	4,294	2,426,363	16	3,188	
31	3,615	2,436,894	1,781	252,531	3,718	2,430,081	31	3,219	

On 3 July, there were 182 cases in hospital with five in intensive care. The seven day rolling average for cases was 933.

In early July 2023, Christchurch millionaires and philanthropists Grant and Marilyn Nelson organised a petition urging the Ministry of Social Development to recover COVID-19 wage subsidies it had paid to businesses during the pandemic. By 2 July 2023, the Ministry had received about NZ$780 million in voluntary repayments and had brought 36 cases of non-repayment to court.

On 10 July, there were 184 cases in hospital with three in intensive care. The seven day rolling average was 771.

On 17 July, there were 185 cases in hospital with four in intensive care. The seven day rolling average was 615.

On 24 July, there were 119 cases in hospital with three in intensive care. The seven day rolling average was 535.

On 31 July, there were 116 cases in hospital with five in intensive care. The seven day rolling average was 514.

=== August ===
Date	Cases		Reinfections		Recoveries		Deaths		Sources
Date	New	Total	New	Total	New	Total	New	Total	Sources
7	4,645	2,441,517	2,304	254,827	3,597	2,433,678	10	3,229	
14	5,372	2,446,874	2,736	257,554	4,604	2,438,282	20	3,249	
21	3,953	2,450,818	1,816	259,365	5,341	2,443,623	12	3,261	
28	3,484	2,454,300	1,451	260,815	3,917	2,447,540	22	3,283	

On 7 August, there were 160 cases in hospital and five people in intensive care. The seven day rolling average was 659.

On 14 August, there were 171 cases in hospital with four people in intensive care. The seven day rolling average was 763. That same day, the Government scrapped the facemask requirement for healthcare facilities and the seven day isolation requirement for positive cases. These changes came into effect at midnight on 15 August.

On 21 August, there were 158 cases in hospital with five people in intensive care. The seven day rolling average was 562. Following the Government's decision to scrap the remaining COVID-19 mandates, the doctors' advocacy group General Practice NZ and University of Otago epidemiologist Michael Baker urged COVID positive individuals to continue isolating and wearing masks. Meanwhile, University of Auckland mathematics professor and Covid-19 modeller Michael Plank said that the lack of mask and isolation requirements would have a minimal impact on case numbers, opining that the main drivers of COVID-19 infection were people who were asymptomatic cases or who had not tested yet. Canterbury had the highest number of cases with 580, followed by Waitematā with 471, and Capital and Coast with 360.

On 28 August, there were 157 cases in hospital with two people in intensive care. The seven day rolling average was 497. Canterbury had the highest number of cases at 541, followed by Waitematā at 434.

On 31 August, the country's sole publicly-founded Long COVID clinic in Christchurch closed after five months of operations.

=== September ===
Date	Cases		Reinfections		Recoveries		Deaths		Sources
Date	New	Total	New	Total	New	Total	New	Total	Sources
4	3,625	2,457,924	1,498	262,313	3,477	2,451,017	11	3,294	
11	3,458	2,461,379	1,517	263,829	3,609	2,454,626	15	3,309	
18	3,095	2,464,470	1,351	265,178	3,463	2,458,089	20	3,329	
25	2,998	2,467,468	1,288	266,466	3,055	2,461,144	18	3,347	

As of 3 September, there were 150 cases in hospital and 12 in intensive care. The seven day rolling average was 516.

On 10 September, there were 221 cases in hospital and six in intensive care. The seven day rolling average was 492.

On 17 September, there were 186 cases in hospital and two in intensive care. The seven day rolling average was 426.

On 21 September, the Covid-19 subvariant BA.2.86 was first detected in New Zealand.

On 24 September, there were 175 cases in hospital and three in intensive care. The rolling day average was 426.

=== October ===
Date	Cases		Reinfections		Recoveries		Deaths		Sources
Date	New	Total	New	Total	New	Total	New	Total	Sources
2	2,968	2,470,435	1,314	267,779	2,976	2,464,120	14	3,361	
9	3,571	2,474,005	1,603	269,382	2,943	2,467,063	15	3,376	
16	3,816	2,477,820	1,735	271,116	3,560	2,470,623	17	3,393	
23	4,018	2,481,834	1,895	273,008	3,782	2,474,405	23	3,416	
30	3,934	2,485,937	2,036	275,125	3,997	2,478,402	29	3,445	

On 2 October, there were 177 cases in hospital and seven in intensive care. The seven day rolling average was 422.

On 9 October, there were 230 cases in hospital and four in intensive care. The seven day rolling average was 510.

On 16 October, there were 243 cases in hospital and two in intensive care. The seven day rolling average was 544.

On 30 October, there were 225 cases in hospital and three in intensive care. The seven day rolling average was 585.

=== November ===
Date	Cases		Reinfections		Recoveries		Deaths		Sources
Date	New	Total	New	Total	New	Total	New	Total	Sources
6	5,872	2,491,809	2,823	277,948	4,079	2,482,481	19	3,464	
13	5,947	2,497,753	3,140	281,087	5,828	2,488,309	38	3,502	
20	7,881	2,505,632	4,073	285,159	5,937	2,494,246	20	3,522	
27	6,814	2,512,440	3,595	288,752	7,852	2,502,098	27	3,549	

On 6 November, 212 cases remained in hospital and five in intensive care. The seven day rolling average was 838 per day.

On 14 November, 284 cases remained in hospital and four in intensive care. The seven day rolling average was 849 per day.

On 20 November, 349 cases remained in hospital and two in intensive care. The seven day rolling average was 1,124 per day.

On 27 November, 327 cases remained in hospital and eight in intensive care. The seven day rolling average was 971 per day. Of the 27 deaths, one was a child under ten years old.

=== December ===
Date	Cases		Reinfections		Recoveries		Deaths		Sources
Date	New	Total	New	Total	New	Total	New	Total	Sources
4	6,656	2,519,095	3,553	292,304	6,777	2,508,875	20	3,569	
11	7,880	2,526,109	4,286	296,135	6,647	2,515,522	27	3,596	
18	7,417	2,533,522	4,144	300,277	6,974	2,522,496	27	3,623	

On 4 December, 332 cases were in hospital with one in intensive care. The seven day rolling average was 951 per day.

On 11 December, 336 cases were in hospital with five in intensive care. The seven day rolling average was 999 per day.

On 18 December, 354 cases were in hospital with six in intensive care. The seven day rolling average was 1,058 per day.

On 21 December, the spread of the JN.1 Omicron variant led to a surge of COVID-19 cases, resulting in 400 hospitalisations per week and 25 deaths. The JN.1 variant accounted for 14% of sequenced cases reported in the week leading up to 15 December. Based on these figures,Institute of Environmental Science and Research (ESR) pathogen genomics technical lead David Winter projected that the JN.1 variant would be the dominant variant by January 2024.
