= Royal Commission of Inquiry into COVID-19 Lessons Learned =

New Zealand Royal Commission of Inquiry

Logo of the Royal Commission of Inquiry into COVID-19 Lessons Learned

The Royal Commission of Inquiry into COVID-19 Lessons Learned (Te Tira Ārai Urutā) is a Royal Commission of Inquiry appointed by the New Zealand Government to look at its official response to the COVID-19 pandemic in New Zealand. Its focus is to look at lessons learned from the Government response to prepare for future pandemics. The inquiry examines the overall pandemic response with the exception of decisions made by the Reserve Bank of New Zealand's Monetary Policy Committee. The first phase report was released in late November 2024. The second phase report was released on 10 March 2026. In late July 2026, the New Zealand Government agreed to accept "in some form" all 63 recommendations of the two inquiries of the COVID-19 Inquiry.

== Background ==
On 5 December 2022, Prime Minister Jacinda Ardern and Minister of Health Ayesha Verrall formally announced that the Labour Government would be holding a Royal Commission of Inquiry into its COVID-19 pandemic response. The inquiry was chaired by Australian-based epidemiologist Tony Blakely, former National Party cabinet minister Hekia Parata, and former New Zealand Treasury secretary John Whitehead. The inquiry was launched on 1 February 2023 and expected to finish in mid-2024. Ardern estimated that the royal commission would cost about NZ$15 million.

The inquiry examined the overall pandemic response including the health response, border management, community care, isolation, quarantine, and the economic response including monetary policy. The inquiry also covered the impact of the pandemic on Māori interests within the framework of the Treaty of Waitangi relationship, its impact on essential workers and vulnerable populations and communities, and the legislative, regulatory and operational settings required to support New Zealand's immediate economic response to a future pandemic.

The inquiry also did not look at the Government's "individual decisions," the application of policies to individual cases or circumstances, judgements and decisions made by courts, tribunals and other agencies on COVID-19-related matters, private sector operations, and certain decisions made by the Reserve Bank's independent monetary policy committee. In addition the inquiry did not look at changes to court and parliamentary proceedings, and the conduct of the 2020 New Zealand general election.

== First phase ==
On 13 November 2023, Radio New Zealand reported that the first stage of the inquiry had been running for several months. The commissioners held private meetings with over 200 organisations including industry leaders from the farming and supermarket sectors, and small regional groups such as the Tolaga Bay Area School. According to Blakely, Ardern from the onset had decided against holding public hearings to promote a non-adversarial atmosphere that would allow the commissioners to have "free and frank" discussions with a range of people. By contrast, the UK COVID-19 Inquiry which had public hearings. In addition to private meetings, the Inquiry planned to launch its second phase at the end of November where people would be allowed to make online submissions. Respondents could choose to remain anonymous and keep their information confidential.

On 1 December 2023, The Spinoff reported that Parata had resigned from the Royal Commission on 15 November 2023 following the electoral defeat of the Labour Government. In response to the incoming National Government's plans to introduce an independent inquiry, Blakely stated that he was open to the new Government reviewing the Royal Commission's terms of reference. That same day, the Royal Commission announced that it had delayed hearing public submissions until 2024 while the National-led coalition government reviews its scope. While National's coalition partner New Zealand First has advocated a separate independent inquiry, Prime Minister Christopher Luxon has indicated his openness to expanding the scope of the Royal Commission.

A website was also set up to allow people to make submissions to the Inquiry before 24 March 2024. The Inquiry would also seek submissions at public events such as A&P shows and festivals. In mid February 2024, Inquiry members Whitehead and Blakely visited several Northland towns including Whangārei, Kaikohe and Kaitaia. The inquiry heard from hundreds of Northland residents and communities including iwi (tribes), health providers, business organisations, Civil Defence, schools and community groups. Iwi organisation Te Rūnanga o Whaingaroa's chief executive Bree Davis testified about the difficulties in accessing resources from Wellington caused by the lockdowns, which forced the iwi to depend on its own resources. Business representatives including Dickie Burman of Kerikeri District Business and Dave Templeton of the regional development agency Northland Inc testified about the disruptions caused by the lockdowns. Former Member of Parliament and Māori leader Hone Harawira, who organised the Te Tai Tokerau Border Control, defended the lockdowns but criticised the previous Labour Government for not working more with Māori communities. By 23 February, 3,000 people had contributed to the Inquiry.

By late June 2024, the Inquiry had received 13,000 submissions in its first phase.

== Revamp ==
While epidemiologist Michael Baker welcomed the inquiry as a means of preparing for the next pandemic, the Green and National parties regarded the inquiry's scope as too narrow and called for a separate review into its economic impact. While campaigning during the lead up to the 2023 New Zealand general election, the populist New Zealand First party's leader Winston Peters had criticised the Royal Commission's terms of reference for being "too limited" and called for an unrestricted COVID-19 inquiry that was not run by Parliament.

Following the 2023 New Zealand election, the incoming National-led coalition government announced that it would hold a separate independent inquiry into the handling of the COVID-19 pandemic in New Zealand. National had forged a coalition agreement with New Zealand First, which had campaigned on compensating people who lost their jobs due to the vaccine mandates or suffered vaccine injuries. As part of the National-NZ First coalition agreement, the independent inquiry would be conducted publicly with both local and international experts. This independent inquiry would cover the use of multiple lockdowns, vaccine procurement and efficacy, the social and economic impacts at both national and regional levels, and whether the Government's COVID-related decisions and steps were justified.

On 21 December 2023, lawyer Deborah Chambers KC advocated that the Royal Commission be scrapped, claiming that the terms of reference and methodology were "unfit for purpose." Chambers also opined that the leadership of the Royal Commission were not conducive to a broad, independent inquiry.

On 2 February 2024, Internal Affairs Minister Brooke Van Velden announced that the National-led Government would expand the scope of the Royal Commission as part of its coalition agreements with the ACT and New Zealand First parties. Public consultation would begin in February 2024 to include the use of multiple lockdowns, vaccine procurement, the socio-economic of the COVID-19 pandemic on regional and national levels, the cost-effectiveness of the government's policies, the extent of disruption to public health, education and businesses caused by the Government's policies, and whether the government response was consistent with the rule of law.

== Second phase ==
On 25 June 2024, Van Velden confirmed that the Inquiry's terms of references would be expanded during its second phase. The second phase's terms of references included vaccine efficacy and safety, the use of vaccine mandates, the extent of disruption caused by the Government's pandemic response to New Zealanders' health, education and business, the extended lockdowns in Auckland and Northland, the utilisation of partnerships with business and professional groups, and the utilisation of new technology, methods, and effective international practices. The second phase began in November 2024 and is expected to deliver its final recommendations by February 2025. Van Velden also confirmed that Whitehead and Blakely would step down in November prior to the commencement of the second phase, and would be joined by a third commissioner who would participate in the second phase.

In response, New Zealand First leader Winston Peters invoked the first use of the "agree to disagree" provisions in the coalition agreements. Peters said that NZ First strongly disagreed with the Government's decision to complete the current Royal Commission into the COVID-19 inquiry first and retain its chair Blakely. Peters also claimed that the initial inquiry was "designed to cover the Labour Party's backside, to cover their incompetence and to cover the gross waste of the Covid lockdown months." In response, Labour leader Chris Hipkins, who was Minister for COVID-19 Response, accused Peters of trying to appeal to conspiracy theorists and joked that Peters would prefer former TVNZ host and anti-vaccination activist Liz Gunn as a commissioner.

On 27 August, the Government announced a new chair and commissioners for the second phase of the COVID-19 Inquiry. Grant Illingworth KC was appointed chair, asked to focus on government decisions in 2021 and 2022 about vaccine efficacy and lockdowns. The Government also appointed public and economic policy professional Judy Kavanagh, and barrister Anthony Hill, who is a former health and disability commissioner. They replaced Phase 1 chair Professor Tony Blakely and commissioner John Whitehead when the first phase concludes on 28 November 2024.

On 25 February 2025, executive director Helen Potiki and legal counsels Nick Whittington and Kristy McDonald KC resigned from the second phase of the Royal Commission.

=== Public hearings ===
On 7 July 2025, public hearings into the second phase of the COVID-19 Inquiry began, and were livestreamed onto the Royal Commission's website. Counsel Nicolette Levy KC gave a briefing about the hearings, confirming that the Commission had received 7,400 documents, 31 public submissions and interviewed 20 government officials. During the first day, the Commission heard testimonies from several business people including Whāriki Māori Business Network representative Heta Hudson, NorthChamber CEO Leah McKerrow, NorthChamber president Tim Robinson, and New Zealand National Fieldays Society head of customer and strategic engagement Taryn Storey; who testified about the impact of lockdowns, travel restrictions and vaccine mandates on the business sector. Long Covid Support Aotearoa spokesperson Catherine Appleby criticised the second phase of the Royal Commission for not prioritising individuals with Long Covid and called for an inquiry into Long Covid similar to the Australian inquiry between 2022 and 2023. That same day, Auckland's Heart of the City's CEO Viv Beck testified about the adverse economic impact of COVID lockdowns on businesses in 2020. The Employers and Manufacturers Association's (EMA) employment relations and safety manager Paul Jarvie also told the Royal Commission about the legal challenges that vaccine mandates created for businesses in 2021-22. NorthChamber president Robinson criticised the coercive nature of vaccine mandates. Robinson also told the Commission about the adverse economic impact of the Auckland lockdowns on Northland Region.

On 8 July, former Prime Minister and COVID-19 Response Minister Chris Hipkins confirmed he was working on a written response to questions from the Royal Commission. He criticised the second phase's term of references for excluding the period when New Zealand First was part of the Sixth Labour Government in 2020. He also alleged that the terms of references had been constructed in a way that gave a platform to conspiracy theorists. That same day, the Royal Commission confirmed that it had not made any decisions on which leaders and politicians would appear for a public hearing in response to an inaccurate Radio New Zealand report that former Prime Minister Jacinda Ardern had been asked by the Royal Commission to give evidence at a public hearing in August 2025.

On 8 July, the Royal Commission heard testimony from health experts and disabled community leaders in Auckland including Dr Antje Deckert, Pasifika Future chief executive Debbie Sorensen, Auckland Council disability advisory group co-chair Barry De Geest, general practitioner Dr Fiona Bolden and Age Concern New Zealand representative Karen Billings-Jensen. Deckert said that Police were unsure how to enforce lockdown rules during the extended Auckland and Northland lockdowns in 2021. Sorensen told the Royal Commission that Pasifika New Zealanders were overrepresented during the 2021 Delta strain outbreak; accounting for 27% of cases. de Geest told the Commission that mask or vaccine exempt disabled individuals encountered discrimination during the COVID-19 pandemic. Bolden defended the necessity of the lockdowns, claiming that more people would have died without them. Billings-Jensen said that the increased digitisation of support services created challenges for elderly people.

On 9 July, the Royal Commission heard testimony in Auckland from widow Ruth Schuman, Manurewa Pasifika community leader Penina Ifopo and Reverend Victor Pouesi of the Christian Church of Samoa. Schuman spoke of the impact of not being able to physically visit her husband at an aged care facility during the Level 4 lockdown in 2020. Ifopo testified that many Pasifika families were ill equipped to provide children with tools for online learning such as laptops and wifi and added that many Pasifika funerals were affected by lockdown restrictions. Pouesi talked about the spread of fear and misinformation about COVID-19 and vaccines among Pasifika communities. He talked about his church's efforts to broadcast information from the government and social services to congregants. That same day, the Commission heard testimony from representatives of several Māori health and social services organisations in Auckland including Te Whānau o Waipareira director Hector Kawai and Whanau ora community clinics deputy director Raewyn Bhana, who testified about the spread of misinformation and argued for the need of Māori-led community health initiatives to reach Māori communities. In addition, hospitality worker Jodie Rameka testified about encountering hostility from customers unwilling to comply with COVID facemask requirements.

On 10 July, a spokesperson for Ardern confirmed that the former Prime Minister would provide evidence to assist the second phase of the Royal Commission. Ardern had previously testified to the first phase of the COVID-19 Lessons Learned Inquiry. That same day, the Royal Commission heard testimony in Auckland from representatives of anti-vaccine group Voices for Freedom, The Health Forum and FACT Aotearoa. Chair Grant Illingworth KC questioned Voices for Freedom founders Alia Bland and Claire Deeks, and legal manager Katie Ashby-Koppens on their thoughts about the government's COVID-19 response. Bland accused the New Zealand Government of making "politically-motivated decisions" during its COVID-19 response and claimed that many of the decisions were contrary to advice, citing Official Information Act requests (OIAs) and internal memos. FACT member Jacinta O'Reilly also testified about the impact of disinformation during the COVID-19 pandemic.

On 11 July, the Royal Commission held its fifth and final day of the first session of hearings in Auckland. The Commission head testimonies about the impacts of mandates from representatives of health organisations including Autism New Zealand research and advocacy adviser Lee Patrick, Hato Hone St John general manager of ambulance operations Johnny Mulheron, New Zealand Nurses Organisation (NZN0) president Anne Daniels and New Zealand College of Midwives representative Claire Macdonald. Patrick told the inquiry that several autism disability support staff had left their jobs due to the vaccine mandate, childcare and lockdown pressures. Patrick reiterated Autism New Zealand's support for vaccine mandates. Mulheron told the inquiry that St John lost one percent of its staff during the COVID-19 pandemic but said that the majority of staff supported the vaccine and mandates. Daniels testified that the nursing community was unprepared for future pandemics due to reductions in public sector funding for health infrastructure. McDonald told the Commission that the midwives community was not prepared for the previous Government's termination of vaccine mandates in 2022 and said that Health New Zealand was slow in updating its vaccine mandate policy and rehiring staff who had left because of the vaccine mandate. The inquiry is expected to resume in August 2025 in Wellington and will hear from key decision makers who led and guided the New Zealand government response to the COVID-19 pandemic.

On 13 August, the Royal Commission's chairperson Grant Illingworth KC confirmed that the second session of public hearings scheduled for August would not proceed after former Labour ministers Jacinda Ardern, Chris Hipkins, Grant Robertson and Ayesha Verrall jointly decline to participate in the public hearings. Illingworth confirmed that the four former ministers had already contributed to the second phase of the Royal Commission via private interviews and had agreed to answer further questions if needed. National MP and minister Chris Bishop accused Hipkins of not "caring about the effects his decisions had on Kiwis," citing the economic and social impacts of the prolonged Auckland lockdowns and untargeted spending. In response, Hipkins said that he had already been interviewed by the inquiry twice and said that the public hearings would have involved a repeat of the same questions. The second phase of the Royal Inquiry is expected to report back to the Governor-General in late February 2026.

== Reports ==
=== First phase report ===
On 28 November 2024, the Royal Commission of Inquiry released its first phase report, which was authored by Tony Blakely, John Whitehead and Grant Illingworth. It found that the use of lockdowns and vaccine mandates had helped curb the spread of COVID-19 but also eroded social cohesion and trust in the Government. The report also acknowledged that misinformation and disinformation had contributed to the erosion of social cohesion and trust in the Government's pandemic response. The report also concluded that the repeated lockdowns in Auckland had "cumulative and multifaceted" impacts on the local economy, physical and mental health. Groups that were disproportionately affected by the lockdowns included Māori and Pasifika New Zealanders, lower socio-economic communities and students in Auckland. The report credited efforts by Māori and other community groups with alleviating some of the "potential negative impacts" of the lockdown.

The first phase report presented a long list of lessons to be learned from the COVID-19 pandemic and proposed 39 recommendations for future pandemics. These recommendations included establishing a central agency to coordinate all preparation and response planning for future pandemics, developing an "all-of-government" response plan, developing lockdown and border restriction plans and identifying circumstances for imposing vaccine mandates. University of Canterbury statistician Michael Plank defended the Government's COVID-19 pandemic response while University of Otago epidemiologist Michael Baker welcomed the report's recommendations. University of Auckland vaccinologist Helen Petousis-Harris commended the report for acknowledging the lack of early support for Māori and Pacific providers to deliver vaccines to their own communities while expressing concern about the dangers of disinformation and misinformation in future pandemics. Former COVID-19 response minister and former Prime Minister Chris Hipkins acknowledged that the 2021 Auckland lockdown and vaccine rollout had been "incredibly challenging." Outgoing Inquiry chair Tony Blakely urged the Government to be prepared for future pandemics and expressed concerns about the Sixth National Government's public sector job cuts.

=== Second phase report ===
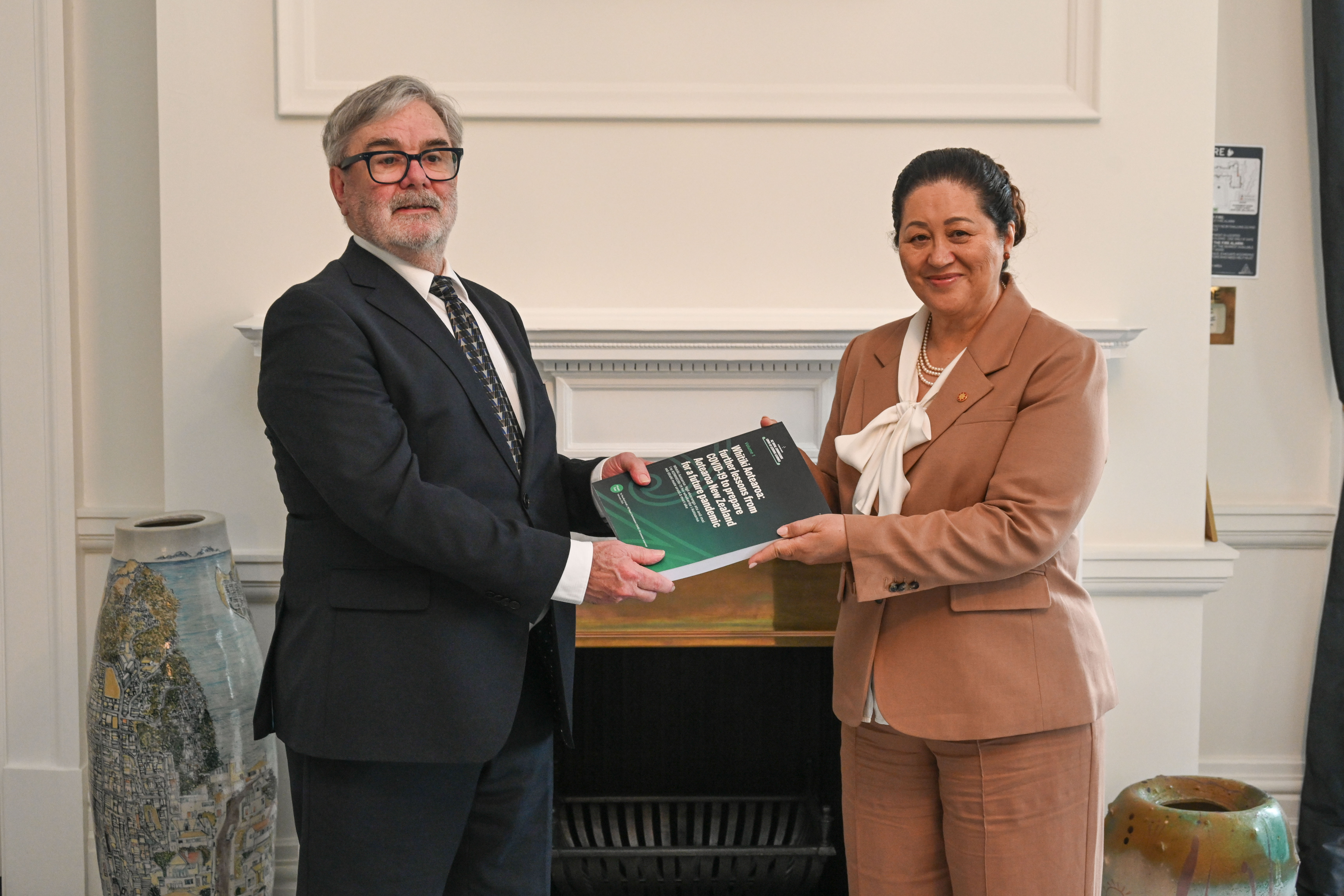
Commission chair Grant Illingworth presents the second-phase report to the governor-general, Dame Cindy Kiro at Government House, Wellington, on 28 February 2026

The second phase report was released on 10 March 2026. It consisted of three volumes and was over 530 pages. The report concluded that the Government's COVID-19 policies were effective but were late and not well communicated to the public. It identified four lessons and made 24 recommendations to the Government. The four lessons were to improve systems that promote good government decision-making, enact pandemic legislation that would act as a guardrail for rights and freedoms, "shock-proofing" the government's economic policies and developing readiness for social impacts and post-pandemic recovery. Some of the Commission's 24 recommendations included developing options for income and business support for future pandemics, developing clear legislation for limiting the scope of emergency power, developing human rights safeguards, emphasising that elimination strategies were only temporary measures, conducting research on getting society "back to normal," ensuring transparency in the pandemic decision-making process, researching the impacts of pandemic measures on people and policies, and updating Cabinet rules to review pandemic decisions.

The Royal Commission also found that the COVID-19 Vaccine Technical Advisory Group had expressed concern that young people aged between 12–17 years had a higher risk of myocarditis than older age groups following the second dose of the Pfizer COVID-19 vaccine. This report was not passed onto the Government. The Commission also found that the Accident Compensation Corporation had accepted 1,740 out of 4,318 claims related to COVID-19 vaccine injuries, including five fatal injury claims.

Minister of Health Simeon Brown said that the Government would table the government's response by July 2026. He said that the report's findings showed that the previous Labour Government ignored evidence, advice and warnings, and made bad decisions around vaccines, the duration of COVID-19 lockdown restrictions and misdirected economic stimulus. Brown criticised the previous government's decision to extend the Auckland lockdown in late 2021 and to allocate half of the NZ$60 million COVID response and recovery funds to projects not related to the pandemic. Similar criticism of the previous government's policies was echoed by ACT leader David Seymour and New Zealand First leader Winston Peters, with the latter calling for a select committee inquiry into COVID-19 vaccine injuries.

In response, Labour leader Chris Hipkins defended the Labour government's response, stating they were "considered, appropriate, and guided by the best evidence available at the time." Former Prime Minister Jacinda Ardern and former Finance Minister Grant Robertson issued a joint statement saying that the second phase report vindicated their government's response to the COVID-19 pandemic and that corroborated the findings of the first phase report.

== Implementation ==
On 29 July 2026, Health Minister Simeon Brown said that the Government would accept 21 recommendations of the two inquiries in full, 36 recommendations "in principle," and had partially accepted six recommendations. The resulting changes would be implemented within 12 months. Cabinet also agreed to release advice on any major decision affecting individual rights within five working days in future pandemics. While the Government decided not to proceed with standalone pandemic legislation, they agreed to review the Health Act to ensure future pandemic responses balance between the protection of public health, the economy and New Zealanders' rights.

Notable full recommendations included establishing a pandemic expert advisory group, developing an all-of-government pandemic response plan and structure, identifying conditions for vaccine requirements and mitigating their impact, developing and maintaining sector pandemic plans, developing plans to maintain a functioning prison system during a pandemic, maintaining access to education, presenting elimination plans as temporary, clarifying the role of fiscal and monetary policy during economic shocks caused by pandemics, researching the impact of COVID policies on the delivery of government services, and increasing the frequency of official economic statistics.

"In principle" recommendations included developing comprehensive plans for managing international border restrictions, lockdowns, and financial assistance schemes, developing a labour market plan for pandemic response, determining the costs and benefits of improving ventilation in hospitals and health facilities, ensuring all legislation is fit for purpose in a pandemic, developing standard primary legislation for pandemics, limiting future use of urgency and bespoke pandemic legislation and the New Zealand Treasury publishing a four-year Financial Resilience report on debt levels and fiscal buffers for major shocks.

The Government agreed to partially accept strengthening oversight and accountability for pandemic preparedness and other national risks, developing options for improving ventilation and filtration in non-health public buildings, determining governance arrangements and responsibilities for a coordinated economic response, exploring steps to maintain port performance and to mitigate trade, aviation and shipping performance, ensure ongoing functioning of lifeline utilities and the continued provision of essential goods and services, and enhancing transparency by publishing advice related to the exercise of pandemic powers.
