= Timeline of the COVID-19 pandemic in New Zealand (2022) =

The following is a timeline of the COVID-19 pandemic in New Zealand during 2022.

== Transmission timeline ==
Data about the previous day is extracted from the Institute of Environmental Science and Research's database at 9:00 am daily and is publicly released by the Ministry of Health around 1:00 pm.

NB: Clicking on any of the years at the top of the table brings you to Timeline of the COVID-19 pandemic in New Zealand (2022)

=== January ===
Date	Cases		Recoveries		Deaths		Active cases				Sources
Date	New	Total	New	Total	New	Total	Border	Community	Other	Total	Sources
1	-	-	-	-	-	-	-	-	-	-	No Update
2	137	14,255	25	13,044	0	51	135	1,025	0	1,160	
3	51	14,306	73	13,117	0	51	150	988	0	1,138	
4	60	14,365	54	13,171	0	51	176	967	0	1,143	
5	40	14,405	81	13,252	0	51	185	917	0	1,102	
6	62	14,467	83	13,335	0	51	226	855	0	1,081	
7	59	14,525	71	13,406	0	51	248	820	0	1,068	
8	-	-	-	-	-	-	-	-	-	-	No update
9	77	14,673	60	13,535	0	51	294	793	0	1,087	
10	60	14,733	74	13,609	0	51	314	759	0	1,073	
11	23	14,756	45	13,654	0	51	322	729	0	1,051	
12	93	14,848	80	13,734	1	52	385	677	0	1,062	
13	41	14,887	66	13,800	0	52	396	639	0	1,035	
14	61	14,947	42	13,844	0	52	433	618	0	1,051	
15	54	15,001	98	13,944	0	52	433	572	0	1,005	
16	68	15,069	48	13,992	0	52	471	554	0	1,025	
17	58	15,127	59	14,051	0	52	479	545	0	1,024	
18	44	15,170	39	14,090	0	52	499	529	0	1,028	
19	80	15,249	81	14,171	0	52	519	507	0	1,026	
20	85	15,334	74	14,245	0	52	525	512	0	1,037	
21	67	15,401	54	14,300	0	52	561	468	0	1,049	
22	84	15,479	58	14,359	0	52	590	478	0	1,068	
23	71	15,550	43	14,402	0	52	630	466	0	1,096	
24	75	15,250	38	14,440	0	52	666	467	0	1,133	
25	62	15,687	31	1,4471	0	52	694	470	0	1,164	
26	59	15,745	32	14,503	0	52	709	481	0	1,190	
27	96	15,842	46	14,549	0	52	734	507	0	1,241	
28	150	15,991	70	14,619	0	52	753	567	0	1,320	
29	155	16,146	70	14,689	0	52	775	630	0	1,405	
30	140	16,286	48	14,737	0	52	787	710	0	1,497	
31	130	16,416	73	14,810	1	53	783	770	0	1,553	

On 2 January, two new deaths were reported at Auckland City Hospital within the past 48 hours.

On 8 January, two new locations of interests were identified in Rotorua including a Burger Fuel restaurant and BP Connection petrol station.

On 10 January, two new locations of interests were identified in Queenstown including a SkyCity casino.

On 12 January, the Ministry of Health reported two new deaths. These fatalities included a man in his 30s who died at home on 5 January and a man in his 60s who died at Middlemore Hospital on 9 January.

On 19 January, health authorities confirmed that two COVID-19 positive individuals in Auckland (an Auckland Airport worker and a household contact of an MIQ worker) had the Omicron variant.

By 20 January, the Hawke's Bay region had reported a total of six cases in the region, five of them linked to a positive case who visited a fitness class.

On 21 January, nine cases were reported in Motueka in the Nelson–Marlborough Region.

By 22 January, the number of cases in Hastings had risen to 13.

On 27 January, 34 new Omicron cases were reported, bringing the total number of Omicron community cases to 90. That same day, the Soundsplash music festival which took place in Hamilton between 21 and 23 January was identified as a location of interest. Five attendees had tested positive for COVID-19, with one testing positive for the Omicron variant. By 28 January, 68 people were considered close contacts of the infected, with health experts warning that the Soundsplash festival could become a superspreader event.

On 28 January, 15 new Omicron cases were reported, bringing the total number of Omicron community cases to 105.

On 30 January, the Health Ministry confirmed that a patient in their 70s at North Shore Hospital had died from COVID-19, bringing the death toll to 53. Due to technical issues, the Health Ministry had not included 40 new cases in Auckland for the daily report.

=== February ===
Date	Cases		Recoveries		Deaths		Active cases				Sources
Date	New	Total	New	Total	New	Total	Border	Community	Other	Total	Sources
1	205	16,620	55	14,865	0	53	826	876	0	1,702	
2	196	16,816	64	14,929	0	53	841	994	0	1,835	
3	191	17,005	49	14,978	0	53	853	1,121	0	1,974	
4	273	17,278	67	15,045	0	53	881	1,298	0	2,179	
5	269	17,546	60	15,105	0	53	876	1,512	0	2,388	
6	227	17,773	96	15,201	0	53	833	1,686	0	2,519	
7	215	17,988	27	15,228	0	53	842	1,865	0	2,707	
8	265	18,253	92	15,320	0	53	832	2,048	0	2,880	
9	250	18,503	95	15,415	0	53	826	2,209	0	3,035	
10	336	18,337	84	15,499	0	53	815	2,470	0	3,295	
11	478	19,313	101	15,600	0	53	786	2,874	0	3,660	
12	466	19,777	65	15,665	0	53	756	3,303	0	4,059	
13	835	20,228	-	-	-	-	-	-	-	-	
14	1,796	21,573	199	15,864	0	53	696	4,690	0	5,696	
15	763	22,328	102	15,966	0	53	673	5,636	0	6,309	
16	1,203	23,509	125	16,091	0	53	644	6,721	0	7,365	
17	1,588	25,050	172	16,263	0	53	587	8,147	0	8,734	
18	1,947	26,935	207	16,470	0	53	538	9,874	0	10,412	
19	1,915	28,751	136	16,606	0	53	491	11,601	0	12,092	
20	2,539	31,087	169	16,775	0	53	474	13,785	0	14,259	
21	2,377	33,317	118	16,893	0	53	443	15,928	0	16,371	
22	2,860	36,162	187	17,080	3	56	401	18,625	0	19,026	
23	3,305	39,345	187	17,267	0	53	374	21,648	0	22,022	
24	6,145	45,473	201	17,648	0	56	338	27,611	0	27,949	
25	12,030	57,497	253	17,721	0	56	325	39,395	0	39,720	
26	13,612	71,122	226	17,947	0	56	311	52,808	0	53,119	
27	14,892	86,138	167	18,114	0	56	336	67,631	0	67,968	
28	14,657	100,821	218	18,332	0	56	327	82,105	0	82,433	

On 4 February, New Zealand reported a record 209 new community: 21 in Northland, 99 in the Auckland Region, 51 in Waikato, 15 in Rotorua, 15 in Bay of Plenty, three in Hawke's Bay, four in Tairāwhiti and one in MidCentral. In addition, 64 cases were reported in managed isolation.

On 7 February, several schools reported positive cases among students and staff including Te Mata Primary School (four students) in Hastings' Havelock North suburb, Hamilton Boys' High School (one student), Hamilton Christian School (one student), Rototuna Junior and Senior High School (one student), Melville Intermediate School (one student) and Prospect School (one staff member) in Auckland's Glen Eden suburb.

On 10 February, Queenstown in the South Island's Otago region reported two community cases. These mark the first new community cases in the Southern District Health Board since 17 April 2020. That same day, two students at Ilminister Intermediate School in Gisborne in the North Island tested positive for COVID-19. As a result, half the school and seven teachers were into self-isolation. Later that day, a community case was reported in Dunedin. The individual had spent time in Wānaka and Cromwell during their infectious period.

On 11 February, two community cases were reported in Invercargill and Gore, New Zealand in the South Island's Southland Region. Both cases had previously visited the Queenstown area.

On 12 February, six staff and seven patients at Auckland City Hospital tested positive for COVID-19. In response, all patients and two staff at two wards for the elderly were ordered to undergo testing.

On 13 February, a positive case was reported at Musselburgh School in Dunedin. In response, all Year 5 and Year 6 students at the school were identified as close contacts with families being asked to get their children tested.

On 14 February, 19 cases were reported in Otago and Southland, bringing the total number of cases in the Southern District Health Board to 51.

On 15 February, a student at Gore Main School tested positive for COVID-19; prompting 25 other students, three teachers, and two teacher aides to go into self-isolation. In addition, Gore Preschool was closed as a precaution after a visitor tested positive for COVID-19.

On 17 February, Public Health South and the University of Otago confirmed that two parties held on Castle Street and Hyde Street between 12 and 15 February during Orientation Week were close contact sites. Students who attended the parties were advised by health authorities to get tested. Though the University advised all students attending the party to get tested, confusion emerged when local health providers including WellSouth opted to only test individuals who were symptomatic or close contacts.

By 18 February, several Dunedin schools including Carisbrook School, Bradford School, Balmacewen Intermediate School, Otago Boys' High School, Columba College, and Queenstown's Wakatipu High School had reported positive cases.

On 21 February, two new deaths were reported in Auckland. One was a patient at Middlemore Hospital while the other was a patient in their 70s at Auckland City Hospital.

On 22 February, a Dunedin pathology worker at Southern Community Laboratory tested positive for COVID-19. That same day, King's and Queen's High Schools in Dunedin also reported positive cases.

From 24 February, RATs are now included in the daily tally separate from PCR tests. In addition, health authorities confirmed the death of another patient at Middlemore Hospital in Auckland. That same day, the Convoy 2022 New Zealand's Wellington protest camp was identified by the Health Ministry as a "location of interest." People present the occupation between 11.55am and 11pm on 19 February and 11am and 11.59pm on 20 February were considered close contacts.

On 25 February, five new deaths were reported in hospital, bringing the death toll to 62. Two were from Auckland's North Shore Hospital, two from Waikato and one from Tauranga.

On 28 February, David Parker tested positive for COVID-19, become the first New Zealand Member of Parliament to test positive for the disease.

=== March ===
Date	Cases		Recoveries		Deaths		Active cases				Sources
Date	New	Total	New	Total	New	Total	Border	Community	Other	Total	Sources
1	19,588	118,812	281	18,613	0	56	283	99,859	0	100,143	
2	22,160	142,321	135	18,748	0	56	276	123,836	0	124,114	
3	23,194	166,098	515	19,263	0	56	252	146,527	0	146,779	
4	22,535	188,680	16,875	36,138	7	63	126	152,353	0	152,479	
5	18,840	207,562	3,442	39,580	0	63	126	167,793	0	167,919	
6	15,162	222,767	3,586	43,166	2	65	123	179,413	0	179,536	
7	17,582	240,319	4,480	47,646	0	65	116	192,492	0	192,608	
8	23,913	264,255	23,965	71,611	0	65	127	192,452	0	192,579	
9	22,466	286,750	12,817	84,428	0	65	116	202,141	0	202,257	
10	21,030	307,803	14,560	98,988	-	91	110	208,624	0	208,734	
11	21,012	328,836	19,895	118,883	5	98	113	209,754	0	209,867	
12	18,715	347,576	22,195	141,078	7	105	121	206,284	0	206,405	
13	14,516	362,109	23,543	164,621	8	113	136	197,251	0	197,387	
14	15,562	377,685	22,495	187,116	1	114	147	190,320	0	190,467	
15	21,633	399,342	18,859	205,975	1	115	157	193,108	0	193,265	
16	19,487	418,861	15,109	221,084	22	141	188	197,464	0	197,652	
17	19,591	438,452	17,411	238,495	10	151	207	199,640	0	199,847	
18	14,148	452,600	90,170	328,665	3	156	156	123,711	0	123,867	
19	18,559	471,225	18,751	347,416	6	164	186	123,479	0	123,665	
20	12,046	483,222	14,521	361,937	7	175	193	120,941	0	121,134	
21	14,495	497,731	15,572	377,509	12	184	203	119,856	0	120,059	
22	20,941	518,685	21,653	399,162	14	199	220	119,126	0	119,346	
23	20,130	538,839	19,504	418,666	7	210	224	119,756	0	119,989	
24	18,467	557,330	19,603	438,269	8	221	243	118,626	0	118,869	
25	15,900	573,230	14,149	452,418	9	234	255	120,370	0	120,625	
26	14,212	587,467	15,995	468,413	16	254	252	118,585	0	118,837	
27	10,272	597,745	14,598	483,011	6	258	255	114,256	0	114,511	
28	12,934	610,687	14,469	497,480	8	269	277	112,699	0	112,976	
29	17,192	627,898	20,925	518405	35	303	291	108,936	0	109,227	
30	15,966	643,875	20,127	538,532	12	317	296	104,769	0	105,065	
31	15,289	659,175	18,469	557,001	20	338	288	101,587	0	101,875	

On 6 March, the Chatham Islands recorded its first two cases of COVID-19. In response, the Canterbury District Health Board distributed rapid antigen kits to all households residing on the islands.

On 7 March, four Members of Parliament including National Party MP Simon Bridges, Police Minister Poto Williams, Attorney General David Parker, and Labour Party MP Anahila Kanongata'a-Suisuiki tested positive for COVID-19. In addition, Māori Party co-leader Rawiri Waititi entered into isolation after his family tested positive.

By 8 March, National Party leader Christopher Luxon along with fellow National MPs Mark Mitchell and Stuart Smith had tested positive for COVID-19. In addition a third of National MPs and six Labour MPs had entered into self-isolation after being identified as close contacts.

On 10 March, the death statistic definition was changed to include all cases who died within 28 days of being reported as a COVID-19 case even if their cause of death was ultimately unrelated. Because of this the Ministry also began reporting separate tallies of deaths classified as being clearly caused by COVID-19 and clearly not caused by it.

On 16 March, the COVID-19 Response Minister Chris Hipkins tested positive for COVID-19.

By 30 March, the Southern District Health Board had reported 8,336 active cases in the Otago and Southland regions.

=== April ===
Date	Cases		Recoveries		Deaths		Active cases				Sources
Date	New	Total	New	Total	New	Total	Border	Community	Other	Total	Sources
1	13,524	672,712	15,911	572,912	15	355	308	99,178	0	99,486	
2	11,634	684,374	14,215	587,127	16	330	164	96,753	0	96,917	
3	8,841	693,215	10,664	597,791	20	396	306	94,772	0	95,078	
4	10,238	703,467	12,524	610,315	13	405	290	92,499	0	92,789	
5	14,168	717,650	17,189	627,504	23	428	293	89,467	0	89,760	
6	12,618	730,285	15,974	643,478	18	443	288	86,115	0	86,403	
7	11,685	741,987	15,284	658,762	22	456	299	82,500	0	82,799	
8	9,975	751,974	13,531	672,293	9	466	317	78,941	0	79,258	
9	8,557	760,540	11,632	683,925	10	477	304	75,866	0	76,170	
10	6,749	767,295	8,826	692,751	12	489	306	73,781	0	74,087	
11	7,631	774,928	10,242	702,993	12	500	306	71,160	0	71,466	
12	11,110	786,058	14,182	717,175	14	516	310	68,090	0	68,400	
13	9,455	795,606	12,625	729,800	14	531	320	64,989	0	65,309	
14	9,624	805,240	11,686	741,486	17	547	334	62,906	0	63,240	
15	7,826	813,070	9,971	751,457	20	566	327	60,752	0	61,079	
16	5,810	818,882	8,568	760,025	9	576	363	57,951	0	58,314	
17	5,985	824,867	6,756	766,781	11	586	378	57,154	0	57,532	
18	6,283	831,149	7,627	774,408	10	597	308	55,869	0	56,177	
19	8,308	839,455	11,105	785,513	6	602	309	53,063	0	53,372	
20	11,277	850,747	9,514	795,027	12	615	337	54,801	0	55,138	
21	10,360	861,118	9,631	804,658	18	633	353	55,507	0	55,860	
22	9,446	870,591	7,832	812,490	10	646	360	57,131	0	57,491	
23	7,985	878,575	5,796	818,286	17	665	364	59,298	0	59,662	
24	5,706	884,289	5,986	824,272	9	674	367	59,014	0	59,381	
25	5,747	890,039	6,285	830,557	8	683	385	58,453	0	58,838	
26	6,442	896,495	8,306	838,863	5	687	413	56,570	0	56,983	
27	9,904	906,397	11,272	850,135	22	710	427	55,164	0	55,591	
28	9,127	915,522	10,349	860,484	12	723	441	53914	0	54,355	
29	8,316	923,847	9,438	869,922	13	737	462	52,767	0	53,229	
30	7,119	930,969	7,966	877,888	6	744	490	51,889	0	52,379	

On 2 April, Radio New Zealand reported that men accounted for two thirds of COVID-19 deaths in New Zealand, citing figures released by the Ministry of Health. The Health Ministry confirmed that 190 of the COVID-19 fatalities reported in 2022 were men, compared with 114 women. Epidemiologist Michael Baker stated that these trends followed overseas patterns but also identified underlying health conditions and age as bigger factors than biological sex in influencing COVID-19 death rates. In addition, Health Ministry figures confirmed that slightly more women than men were infected by COVID-19, with women accounting for 56% of those hospitalised with the virus.

=== May ===
Date	Cases		Recoveries		Deaths		Active cases				Sources
Date	New	Total	New	Total	New	Total	Border	Community	Other	Total	Sources
1	5,718	936,697	5,705	883,593	5	750	507	51,890	0	52,397	
2	6,726	943,428	5,727	889,320	6	757	538	52,857	0	53,395	
3	9,237	952,697	6,452	895,772	18	777	613	55,581	0	56,194	
4	8,578	961,262	9,873	905,645	22	801	660	54,204	0	54,864	
5	8,706	969,959	9,096	914,741	21	821	675	53,769	0	54,444	
6	7,426	977380	8,295	923,036	23	845	679	52,868	0	53,547	
7	6,838	984,218	7,110	930,155	11	857	692	52,563	0	53,255	
8	5,720	989,946	5,725	935,880	2	860	699	52,557	0	53,256	
9	6,464	996,417	6,726	942,606	2	862	661	52,338	0	52,999	
10	9,251	1,005,674	6,111	948,717	14	876	662	55,469	0	56,131	
11	8,047	1,013,721	11,667	960384	29	902	556	51,926	0	52,482	
12	9,476	1,023,205	8,695	969,079	8	911	544	52,719	0	53,263	
13	7,519	1,030,733	7,404	976,483	29	940	537	52,821	0	53,358	
14	7,130	1,037,855	6,803	983,286	17	958	515	53,145	0	53,660	
15	5,819	1,043,683	5,719	989,005	14	973	517	53,238	0	53,755	
16	7,108	1,050,797	6,466	995,471	6	978	507	53,890	0	54,397	
17	9,906	1,060,710	9,260	1,004,731	8	986	492	54,550	0	55,042	
18	9,661	1,070,373	9,406	1,012,754	30	1,017	506	56,146	0	56,652	
19	9,181	1,079,557	9,469	1,022,223	6	1,022	511	55,850	0	56,361	
20	7,899	1,087,466	7,519	1,029,742	17	1,039	532	56,202	0	56,734	
21	6,720	1,094,192	7,118	1,036,860	7	1,045	554	55,781	0	56,335	
22	5,050	1,099,250	5,818	1,042,678	10	1,055	540	55,025	0	55,565	
23	6,058	1,105,317	7,105	1,049,783	10	1,064	553	53,964	0	54,517	
24	8,500	1,113,828	9,931	1,059,714	14	1,071	556	52,537	0	53,083	
25	8,228	1,122,075	9,641	1,069,355	10	1,086	546	51,113	0	51,679	
26	7,660	1,129,749	9,166	1,078,521	16	1,102	526	49,645	0	50,171	
27	6,952	1,136,708	7,871	1,086,392	30	1,127	523	48706	0	49,229	
28	6,424	1,1431,46	6,710	1,093,102	11	1,140	494	48,452	0	48,946	
29	4,884	1,148,045	5,050	1,098,152	9	1,149	476	48,310	0	48,786	
30	5,888	1,153,946	6,062	1,104,214	5	1,154	467	48,153	0	48,620	
31	8,515	1,162,499	8,487	1,112,701	16	1,172	491	48,179	0	48,670	

On 1 May, the Ministry of Health confirmed its first case of the BA.4 variant of the SARS-CoV-2 Omicron variant. The individual had arrived from South Africa on 22 April and tested positive on 24 April. The second case of the BA.4 variant was reported on 2 May.

On 8 May, New Zealand reported its first case of the BA.5 variant of the Omicron variant at the border. The individual had arrived from South Africa on 26 April and tested positive on 1 May. The following day, two more cases of the BA.5 variant were reported at the border. Both cases originated in South Africa.

On 10 May, the total number of cases in New Zealand exceeded the 1 million mark, rising to 1,005,674.

On 14 May, Prime Minister Jacinda Ardern tested positive for COVID-19. Her partner Clarke Gayford had earlier tested positive for COVID-19 on 8 May.

On 17 May, the total number of recoveries in NZ exceeded the 1 million mark, reaching 1,004,731.

On 18 May, the Health Ministry's announced death toll exceed the 1,000 mark, reaching 1,017. This figure includes COVID-deaths that occurred more than 28 days after a COVID-19 case was reported and deaths with incomplete details.

On 22 May 2022, Mayor of Wellington Andy Foster tested positive for COVID-19.

=== June ===
Date	Cases		Recoveries		Deaths		Active cases				Sources
Date	New	Total	New	Total	New	Total	Border	Community	Other	Total	Sources
1	8,271	1,170,815	8,235	1,120,936	12	1,185	502	48,237	0	48,739	
2	7,965	1,178,816	7,665	1,128,601	11	1,197	520	48,544	0	49,064	
3	6,301	1,185,151	6,953	1,135,554	12	1,210	501	47,933	0	48,434	
4	6,374	1,191,560	6,442	1,141,996	9	1,221	526	47,866	0	48,392	
5	4,450	1,146,889	4,893	1,146,889	7	1,229	530	47,435	0	47,965	
6	-	-	-	-	-	-	-	-	-	-	No update
7	5,831	1,206,411	8,526	1,161,314	8	1,243	505	43,398	0	43,903	
8	7,120	1,213,546	8,297	1,169,611	22	1,267	486	42,233	0	42,719	
9	8,023	1,221,724	7,988	1,177,599	24	1,294	487	42,398	0	42,885	
10	6,383	1,228,187	6,323	1,183,922	7	1,303	507	42,511	0	43,018	
11	5,202	1,233,450	6,390	1,190,312	7	1,311	496	41,388	0	41,884	
12	4,474	1,237,979	4,472	1,194,784	7	1,320	518	41,416	0	41,934	
13	4,481	1,242,497	4,482	1,199,266	6	1,325	531	41,433	0	41,964	
14	6,215	1,248,852	5,878	1,205,144	19	1,348	559	41,863	0	42,422	
15	5,624	1,254,560	7,196	1,248,298	9	1,359	560	40,365	0	40,925	
16	5,542	1,260,441	8,085	1,220,425	13	1,374	570	38,138	0	38,708	
17	4,933	1,265,455	6,453	1,226,878	7	1,390	550	36,712	0	37,262	
18	4,454	1,270,039	5,248	1,232,126	9	1,401	528	36,061	0	36,589	
19	3,277	1,273,389	4,516	1,236,642	5	1,406	496	34,922	0	35,418	
20	4,077	1,277,568	4,549	1,241,191	8	1,415	486	34,554	0	35,040	
21	5,695	1,283,444	6,312	1,247,503	13	1,350	467	34,124	0	34,591	
22	5,577	1,289,128	5,692	1,253,195	18	1,450	474	34,091	0	34,565	
23	5,391	1,294,657	5,898	1,259,093	12	1,431	485	33,699	0	34,184	
24	-	-	-	-	-	-	-	-	-	No update	
25	3,922	1,303,779	4,543	1,268,645	9	1,455	593	33,137	0	33,730	
26	1,261	1,308,387	3,341	1,271,986	6	1,461	634	34,357	0	34,991	
27	5,644	1,314,145	4,169	1,276,155	11	1,472	669	35,900	0	36,569	
28	8,122	1,322,476	5,847	1,282,002	16	1,488	322	39,037	0	39,037	
29	7,929	1,330,538	5,732	1,287,734	12	1,503	715	40,640	0	41,355	
30	7,629	1,338,501	5,553	1,293,267	17	1,522	986	42,782	0	43,768	

On 3 June, the first four community cases of the Omicron subvariant BA.5 and the first case of the BA.4 subvariant were reported in New Zealand.

On 30 June, Deputy Prime Minister Grant Robertson tested positive for COVID-19.

=== July ===
Date	Cases		Reinfections		Recoveries		Deaths		Active cases			Sources
Date	New	Total	New	Total	New	Total	New	Total	Border	Community	Total	Sources
1	7,195	1,345,796	-	-	5,015	1,298,282	7	1,529	1,098	44,943	46,401	
2	6,626	1,352,688	-	-	3,991	1,302,273	21	1,549	1,166	47,755	48,921	
3	5,089	1,357,862	-	-	4,600	1,306,873	11	1,560	1,242	48,242	49,484	
4	6,650	1,364,733	-	-	5,767	1,312,640	7	1,568	1,283	49,298	50,581	
5	9,816	1,374,535	-	-	8,333	1,320,973	22	1,592	1,330	50,698	52,028	
6	-	-	-	-	-	-	-	-	-	-	-	No update
7	11,084	1,403,073	351	-	7,855	1,343,926	15	1,619	1,528	56,058	57,586	
8	9,953	1,412,642	334	14,338	7,392	1,351,318	20	1,641	1,585	58,158	59,743	
9	9,558	1,422,178	333	14,663	6,803	1,358,121	21	1,663	1,665	60,790	62,455	
10	7,747	1,429,924	206	14,869	5,469	1,363,590	9	1,674	1,763	62,960	64,723	
11	8,675	1,438,599	248	15,117	6,571	1,370,161	17	1,688	1,898	64,912	66,810	
12	11,854	1,450,451	440	15,557	9,814	1,379,975	17	1,707	2,028	66,803	68,831	
13	11,819	1,462,257	481	16,035	10,527	1,390,502	29	1,737	2,155	67,296	70,081	
14	11,716	1,473,955	427	16,458	10,909	1,401,411	23	1,760	2,110	68,737	70,847	
15	10,803	1,484,746	419	16,781	9,534	1,410,945	16	1,776	2,164	69,924	72,088	
16	9,549	1,494,272	357	17,226	9,533	1,420,478	28	1,805	2,211	69,842	72,053	
17	6,493	1,500,754	254	17,477	7,751	1,428,229	22	1,827	2,187	68,575	70,762	
18	7,975	1,508,728	309	17,786	8,675	1,436,904	21	1,849	2,266	67,774	70,040	
19	10,772	1,519,490	538	18,318	11,817	1,448,721	19	1,870	2,313	66,653	68,966	
20	10,716	1,530,186	504	18,814	11,744	1,460,465	34	1,907	2,361	65,523	67,884	
21	10,336	1,540,509	479	19,286	11,684	1,472,149	31	1,928	2,411	64,081	66,492	
22	9,087	1,549,589	423	19,709	10,770	1,482,919	22	1,954	2,435	62,345	64,780	
23	8,088	1,557,661	366	20,069	9,483	1,492,402	21	1,976	2,462	60,886	63,348	
24	5,853	1,563,510	234	20,301	6,785	1,499,187	14	1,990	2,493	59,905	62,398	
25	7,297	1,570,802	322	20,621	7,693	1,506,880	16	2,006	2,536	59,445	61,981	
26	9,686	1,580,477	531	21,147	10,705	1,518,146	47	"1,396"	2,612	58,323	60,935	
27	9,124	1,589,584	548	21,692	10,653	1,528,799	31	1,427	2,068	56,750	59,358	
28	7,939	1,597,516	456	22,149	10,312	1,539,111	28	1,455	2,541	54,409	56,950	
29	7,918	1,605,416	493	22,638	9,030	1,548,141	24	1,479	2,495	53,301	55,796	
30	6,475	1,611,885	333	22,970	8,050	1,556,191	2	1,502	2,393	51,799	54,192	
31	4,464	1,616,341	226	23,193	6,110	1,562,301	0	1,502	2,280	50,258	52,538	

On 4 July, University of Canterbury mathematics professor and Covid-19 modeller Michael Plank described the rapid spread of BA.5 variant cases throughout the country as a second wave of COVID-19 infections. He estimated that the BA.5 variant would overtake the BA.2 variant as the dominant variant within New Zealand in a matter of weeks.

On 6 July, no update was released due to technical difficulties on the Ministry of Health's website. As a result, the daily update was delayed till the following day.

On 7 July, the Ministry of Health updated the daily reports to include reinfections.

On 19 July, Public Health Agency Deputy Director-General Dr. Andrew Old announced that the Health Ministry would be changing the reporting of deaths from people who had died of a COVID-19 infection within 28 days to people who had either died as a result of a COVID-19 infection or where COVID-19 was a contributing factor to their death.

On 25 July, the national death toll exceed 2,000, reaching 2,006. 836 COVID-19 cases were in hospital, with Christchurch Hospital reporting 169 cases; its highest number since the COVID-19 pandemic began. The following day, the Ministry of Health revised the definition of COVID-19 deaths from deaths within 28 days of testing positive for COVID-19 to deaths attributed to COVID-19.

=== August ===
Date	Cases		Reinfections		Recoveries		Deaths		Active cases			Sources
Date	New	Total	New	Total	New	Total	New	Total	Border	Community	Total	Sources
1	5,581	1,621,916	82	23,498	7,015	1,569,316	0	1,502	2,187	48,911	51,098	
2	7,388	1,629,298	505	24,003	9,631	1,578,947	61	1,563	2,033	46,755	48,788	
3	6,710	1,635,992	476	24,477	9,094	1,588,041	26	1,589	1,900	44,462	46,362	
4	6,362	1,642,334	101	24,913	7,914	1,595,955	14	1,603	1,802	42,974	44,776	
5	5,505	1,647,826	396	25,303	7,881	1,603,836	21	1,624	1,693	40,673	42,366	
6	4,894	1,652,711	307	25,608	6,444	1,610,280	14	1,638	1,549	39,244	40,793	
7	3,522	1,656,229	210	25,818	4,692	1,614,972	0	1,638	1,537	38,082	39,619	
8	4,174	1,660,402	279	26,097	5,329	1,620,301	0	1,638	1,456	37,007	38,463	
9	6,142	1,666,539	467	26,564	7,343	1,627,644	50	1,688	1,384	35,823	37,207	
10	5,397	1,671,922	413	26,973	6,683	1,634,327	17	1,705	1,345	34,545	35,890	
11	5,022	1,676,938	338	27,309	6,317	1,640,644	21	1,726	1,338	33,230	34,568	
12	4,288	1,681,209	334	27,637	5,487	1,646,131	7	1,733	1,290	32,055	33,345	
13	3,742	1,684,946	301	27,941	4,881	1,651,012	17	1,750	1,277	30,907	32,184	
14	2,762	1,687,705	173	28,114	3,647	1,654,659	0	1,750	1,195	30,101	31,296	
15	3,556	1,691,261	251	28,365	4,050	1,658,709	0	1,750	1,204	29,598	30,802	
16	4,980	1,696,239	410	28,775	6,078	1,664,787	32	1,782	1,170	28,500	29,670	
17	4,673	1,700,900	376	29,147	5,379	1,670,166	12	1,794	1,124	27,816	28,940	
18	4,704	1,705,597	439	29,586	5,054	1,675,220	13	1,807	1,083	27,487	28,570	
19	3,949	1,709,541	391	29,977	4,319	1,679,539	8	1,815	1,065	27,122	28,187	
20	3,425	1,712,957	287	30,261	3,712	1,683,251	9	1,824	1,096	26,786	27,882	
21	2,216	1,715,165	173	30,429	2,909	1,686,160	0	1,824	1,057	26,124	27,181	
22	2,846	1,718,009	234	30,663	3,416	1,689,576	0	1,824	1,029	25,580	26,609	
23	3,832	1,721,836	393	31,055	4,955	1,694,531	17	1,841	998	24,466	25,464	
24	3,287	1,725,110	316	31,367	4,662	1,699,193	4	1,845	962	23,110	24,072	
25	2,922	1,728,018	281	31,647	4,620	1,703,813	0	1,845	940	21,140	22,360	
26	2,488	1,730,494	246	31,890	3,872	1,707,685	20	1,865	967	19,977	20,944	
27	2,279	1,732,765	222	32,112	3,407	1,711,092	4	1,869	977	18,827	19,804	
28	1,394	1,734,157	108	32,220	2,335	1,713,427	0	1,869	947	17,914	18,861	
29	1,749	1,735,902	159	32,379	2,728	1,716,155	0	1,869	910	16,698	17,878	
30	2,592	1,738,492	306	32,685	3,806	1,719,961	15	1,884	898	15,749	16,647	
31	2,353	1,740,840	289	32,970	3,271	1,723,232	9	1,893	861	14,854	15,715	

On 10 August, Radio New Zealand reported that 87 people had died of COVID-19 in their homes since March 2022. According to figures released by the public health service Te Whatu Ora (Health New Zealand), an average of four people have been dying from COVID-19 in their homes since the outbreak of the Omicron virus in New Zealand. 92% of the deceased were aged over 60 years. In terms of ethnic composition, Europeans accounted for over 50% of deaths, Māori accounted for 18% of deaths, and Pasifika accounted for 19% of deaths. In terms of vaccination status, 22% of the decease were unvaccinated, 25% were fully vaccinated, and 49% had received vaccine boosters.

On 13 August, the Ministry of Health confirmed there were 546 COVID-19 patients in hospital including ten in intensive care. The Health Ministry also confirmed that a total of 1,750 deaths could be attributed to COVID-19, with an average of 14 deaths occurring over the past week.

=== September ===
Date	Cases		Reinfections		Recoveries		Deaths		Active cases			Sources
Date	New	Total	New	Total	New	Total	New	Total	Border	Community	Total	Sources
1	2,211	1,743,042	250	33,217	2,884	1,726,116	15	1,908	863	14,155	15,018	
2	1,902	1,744,937	210	33,425	2,481	1,728,597	2	1,910	797	13,633	14,430	
3	1,709	1,746,640	176	33,600	2,270	1,730,867	5	1,915	760	13,098	13,858	
4	1,103	1,747,739	101	33,701	1,463	1,732,330	0	1,915	747	12,747	13,494	
5	1,401	1,749,139	143	33,843	1,693	1,734,023	0	1,915	755	12,446	13,201	
6	2,149	1,751,284	267	34,110	2,556	1,736,579	18	1,933	744	12,028	12,772	
7	1,905	1,753,182	241	34,352	2,336	1,738,915	6	1,939	748	11,580	12,328	
8	1,742	1,754,905	220	34,567	2,198	1,741,113	2	1,941	693	11,158	11,851	
9	1,548	1,756,443	190	34,755	1,884	1,742,997	3	1,944	660	10,842	11,502	
10	1,477	1,757,913	183	34,938	1,701	1,744,698	6	1,950	651	10,614	11,265	
11	981	1,758,884	95	35,029	1,156	1,745,854	0	1,950	634	10,446	11,080	
12	1,230	1,760,113	135	35,164	1,335	1,747,189	0	1,950	614	10,360	10,974	
13	2,019	1,762,125	250	35,412	2,128	1,749,317	12	1,962	576	10,270	10,846	
19	9,606	1,769,694	1,108	36,262	10,949	1,758,138	22	1,972	-	-	-	
27	9,809	1,779,476	1,052	37,300	9,522	1,767,660	58	2,030	-	-	-	

On 13 September, the Ministry of Health announced that it would be shifting its release of COVID-19 updates from daily reports to weekly reports. Future COVID reports will be published on Monday, with the next due to be released on 19 September.

=== October ===
Date	Cases		Reinfections		Recoveries		Deaths		Sources
Date	New	Total	New	Total	New	Total	New	Total	Sources
3	9,975	1,789,425	1,098	38,393	9,776	1,777,436	8	2,038	
10	9,405	1,800,602	1,021	39,616	9,926	1,787,362	17	2,055	
17	14,311	1,814,890	1,465	41,074	11,178	1,798,540	10	2,065	
24	16,399	1,831,233	1,727	42,768	14,245	1,812,785	30	2,095	
31	20,522	1,851,689	2,483	45,208	16,321	1,829,106	11	2,106	

On 13 October, the Ministry of Health reported that the new Omicron subvariant BQ.1.1 was discovered in a COVID-19 positive person and South Island wastewater samples.

On 17 October, the Ministry of Health acknowledged that it had under-reported the number of people hospitalised with COVID-19 throughout the entire pandemic in New Zealand by 5,000. As a result, the official figure was revised from 14,043 to 19,476.

By 27 October, the Ministry of Health reported that cases were averaging over 1,500 per day. 3,575 cases were reported that day while 3,923 cases were reported on 26 October. The Ministry described this surge in cases as part of a "third wave" of COVID-19 cases that year.

=== November ===
Date	Cases		Reinfections		Recoveries		Deaths		Sources
Date	New	Total	New	Total	New	Total	New	Total	Sources
7	20,802	1,872,459	3,173	48,371	20,466	1,849,572	13	2,119	
14	21,595	1,894,029	3,881	52,245	20,749	1,870,321	35	2,154	
21	24,068	1,918,070	17,154	57,117	21,532	1,891,853	28	2,182	
28	27,076	1,945,117	6,547	63,656	24,018	1,915,871	30	2,212	

By 7 November, Radio New Zealand reported that the weekly rolling average of COVID-19 cases had risen by more than 60% since September 2022, leading to a third wave of COVID infections. 15% of the 20,802 cases reported over the past week were re-infections. In addition, the hospitalisation and death rates increased during that period; with 322 in hospital, 8 in intensive care, and 13 deaths. In addition, the population's immunity to COVID-19 was affected by long gaps between boosters and past infections and new overseas COVID strains such as XBB and BQ.1. In response, several public health experts including epidemiologist Michael Baker, immunologist Anna Brooks, and vaccinologist Helen Petousis-Harris called for the reinstatement of mask mandates and government support for vaccine rollouts including the Bivalent vaccine.

=== December ===
Date	Cases		Reinfections		Recoveries		Deaths		Sources
Date	New	Total	New	Total	New	Total	New	Total	Sources
5	34,528	1,979,614	9,099	72,743	27,026	1,942,897	23	2,235	
12	40,098	2,019,685	11,142	83,875	34,491	1,977,388	22	2,257	
19	42,740	2,062,384	12,809	96,675	40,021	2,017,409	31	2,288	
28	32,010	2,094,354	9,660	106,320	42,664	2,060,073	43	2,331	

On 19 December, the Government confirmed that New Zealand's COVID-19 settings would remain unchanged over the summer with positive cases expected to isolate for seven days. The seven day rolling average for new daily cases is 6,099, making it the worst week in the latest Omicron outbreak. Based on these figures, University of Auckland computational evolution senior lecturer Dr David Welch estimated that two or three out of every 100 individuals was being infected. College for Emergency Medicine chair Kate Allan expressed concerns that the movement of tourists to the Coromandel, Thames, Northland Region, Queenstown and Wānaka could place hospitals under strain. University of Otago epidemiologist Dr Michael Baker advised people to wear respirator masks in shopping malls and supermarkets.

== Traffic lights timeline ==
Date	COVID-19 Protection Framework (traffic lights)		
Date	Red	Orange	Green
1 January 2022	Northland	Rest of North Island, South Island	None
21 January 2022	None	New Zealand	None
24 January 2022	New Zealand	None	None
13 April 2022	None	New Zealand	None
13 September 2022	None	None	None
