= Judy McGregor =

New Zealand lawyer, journalist, public servant and academic

Dame Judy McGregor DNZM
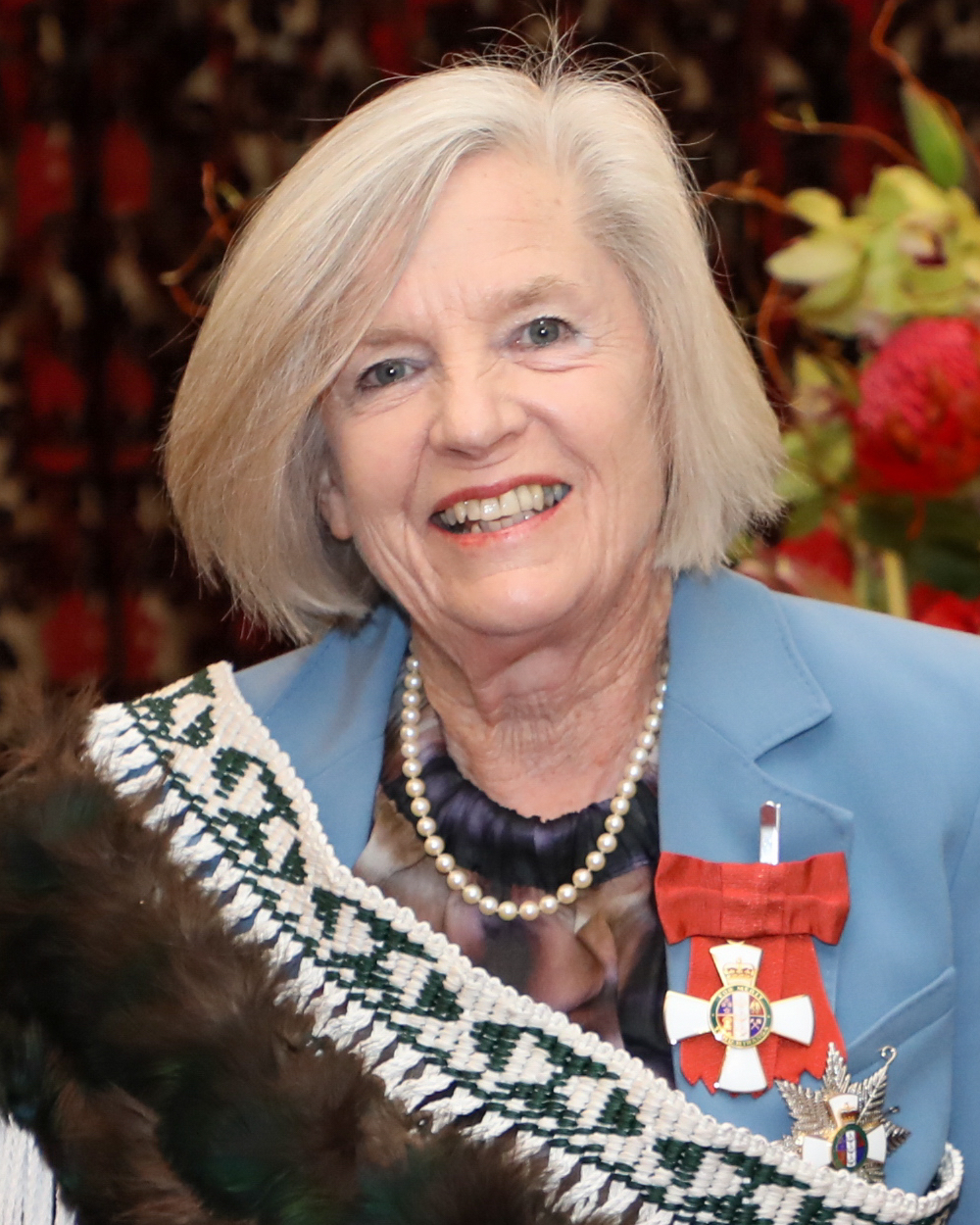
- McGregor in 2022
- Born: 1948 (age 77–78)

Academic background
- Education: Massey University
- Thesis: The "manufacture" of news in the 1993 New Zealand general election (1995)

Dame Judith Helen McGregor DNZM (born 1948) is a New Zealand lawyer, journalist, public servant and academic. She is emeritus professor at Auckland University of Technology.

== Career ==
McGregor completed a Bachelor of Arts degree at the University of Waikato in 1970, where she was founding editor of Nexus, the student magazine. Working as a journalist, she rose to editorship of the Sunday News and the Auckland Star, and served on the Broadcasting Standards Authority. She took a stand against the 1981 Springboks tour, and walked in the 1975 Māori land march.

After a PhD in political communication, completed in 1995, McGregor worked as a professor at Massey University. In the 2004 New Year Honours, McGregor was appointed a Companion of the New Zealand Order of Merit, for services to journalism.

Between 2003 and 2013, McGregor served two five-year terms as the first Equal Employment Opportunities Commissioner for the New Zealand Human Rights Commission, appointed by Minister Margaret Wilson and replaced in the role by politician Jackie Blue. As commissioner, her report Caring Count, based on undercover work in the aged-care industry, had a huge impact and led ultimately to an industry-wide settlement.

McGregor then moved to Auckland University of Technology as professor. In 2016, she was named supreme winner at the Women in Governance Awards. After the resignation of Lester Levy as chair of the Waitematā District Health Board, the Minister of Health, David Clark, appointed McGregor to the role, effective 10 June 2018. McGregor was the last chair of the Waitematā District Health Board as on 1 July 2022 it was disestablished, with Te Whatu Ora (Health New Zealand) assuming its former functions and operations including hospitals and health services.

McGregor was promoted to Dame Companion of the New Zealand Order of Merit, for services to human rights and health, in the 2022 Queen's Birthday and Platinum Jubilee Honours.

Notable students of McGregor include former politician Sue Bradford.

In 2025 she led Pay Equity Coalition Aotearoa which made a submission to the UN Commission on the Status of Women to investigate New Zealand women's economic and political rights in light of the government rolling back the pay equity system, affecting many low-paid essential women workers.

== Selected works ==
- Judy McGregor, Sylvia Bell and Margaret Wilson. "Fault lines: Human Rights in New Zealand" (2015)
- New Zealand Human Rights Commission. "Caring Counts, Tautiaki tika." (2012).
- Judy McGregor and Lance Gray. "Stereotypes and older workers: The New Zealand experience." Social Policy Journal of New Zealand (2002): 163–177.
- Judy McGregor and David Tweed. "Profiling a new generation of female small business owners in New Zealand: Networking, mentoring and growth." Gender, Work & Organization 9, no. 4 (2002): 420–438.
- Judy McGregor, David Tweed, and Richard Pech. "Human capital in the new economy: devil's bargain?." Journal of Intellectual Capital 5, no. 1 (2004): 153–164.
- Lance Gray and Judy McGregor. "Human resource development and older workers: Stereotypes in New Zealand." Asia Pacific Journal of Human Resources 41, no. 3 (2003): 338–353.
