= Waitematā District Health Board =

District health board of New Zealand

Waitemata District Health Board
- Location of the Waitemata DHB (green) in New Zealand
- Formation: 1 January 2001; 25 years ago
- Founder: New Zealand Government
- Dissolved: 1 July 2022; 4 years ago
- Legal status: Active
- Purpose: DHB
- Services: Health and disability services
- Chairperson: Judy McGregor
- Parent organization: Ministry of Health
- Website: www.waitematadhb.govt.nz

The Waitemata District Health Board (Waitemata DHB) was a district health board that provided healthcare to people living in the area that used to be covered by North Shore city, Rodney District, and Waitakere City in New Zealand. It was abolished on 1 July 2022, and replaced with Te Whatu Ora (Health New Zealand).

== History ==
The Waitemata District Health Board, like most other district health boards, came into effect on 1 January 2001 established by the New Zealand Public Health and Disability Act 2000.

On 1 July 2022, the Waitematā DHB and the other 19 district health boards were disestablished, with Te Whatu Ora (Health New Zealand) assuming their former functions and operations including hospitals and health services. The Waitematā DHB was brought under Te Whatu Ora's Northern division.

== Geographic area ==
The area covered by the Waitemata District Health Board was defined in Schedule 1 of the New Zealand Public Health and Disability Act 2000 and based on territorial authority and ward boundaries as constituted as at 1 January 2001. The area could have been adjusted through an Order in Council.

== Governance ==
The initial board was fully appointed. Since the 2001 local elections, the board had been partially elected (seven members) and in addition, up to four members get appointed by the Minister of Health. The minister also appointed the chairperson and deputy-chair from the pool of eleven board members.

=== Final board (2019–2022) ===
Member(s)	Affiliation (if any)
Judy McGregor (chair)	None (appointed)
Kylie Clegg	None (appointed)
Max Abbott	Health Board Action
Edward Benson-Cooper	Independent
John Bottomley	Independent
Chris Carter	Independent
Sandra Coney	Independent
Warren Flaunty	Health Board Action
Allison Roe	Independent
Renata Watene	None (appointed)
Arena Williams	None (appointed)

== Consumer Council ==
Beginning in 2019, the Waitematā DHB had appointed members for its Consumer Council as a part of a push towards consumer co-governance in the healthcare system. According to the Consumer Council page on Waitematā DHB's website, the Consumer Council's goal is provide "a strong and viable voice for the community and consumers, working in partnership with the DHB on healthcare planning, quality improvements and service delivery." Additionally, the council had assisted the development of the New Zealand Registration Examination (NZREX) for Doctors. The Consumer Council appointed a chair and deputy-chair from its 13 members.

=== Final Consumer Council members (2019–2022) ===
Member(s)
Lorelle George (chair)
Ngozi Penson (deputy-chair)
Neli Alo
Insik Kim
Jeremiah Ramos
Maria Halligan
Ravi Reddy
Kaeti Rigarlsford
Vivien Verheijen
Samuel Cho
Alexa Forrest-Pain
Hannah Bjerga
Eden Li

== Demographics ==
Historical population
Year	Pop.	±% p.a.
2006	481,614	—
2013	525,555	+1.26%
2018	586,335	+2.21%

Waitematā DHB served a population of 586,335 at the 2018 New Zealand census, an increase of 60,780 people (11.6%) since the 2013 census, and an increase of 104,721 people (21.7%) since the 2006 census. There were 193,440 households. There were 288,216 males and 298,119 females, giving a sex ratio of 0.97 males per female. The median age was 36.7 years (compared with 37.4 years nationally), with 116,286 people (19.8%) aged under 15 years, 118,899 (20.3%) aged 15 to 29, 272,202 (46.4%) aged 30 to 64, and 78,948 (13.5%) aged 65 or older.

Ethnicities were 65.3% European/Pākehā, 10.1% Māori, 8.6% Pacific peoples, 24.3% Asian, and 3.4% other ethnicities. People may identify with more than one ethnicity.

The percentage of people born overseas was 39.3, compared with 27.1% nationally.

Although some people objected to giving their religion, 49.5% had no religion, 36.0% were Christian, 3.0% were Hindu, 1.6% were Muslim, 1.5% were Buddhist and 2.5% had other religions.

Of those at least 15 years old, 133,344 (28.4%) people had a bachelor or higher degree, and 59,322 (12.6%) people had no formal qualifications. The median income was $35,700, compared with $31,800 nationally. 98,112 people (20.9%) earned over $70,000 compared to 17.2% nationally. The employment status of those at least 15 was that 243,117 (51.7%) people were employed full-time, 67,515 (14.4%) were part-time, and 16,836 (3.6%) were unemployed.

== Hospitals ==
=== Public hospitals ===
- North Shore Hospital (36.7821018°S 174.7548627°E) in Takapuna has 663 beds and provides maternity, medical, geriatric, children's health, surgical, psychogeriatric and mental health services.
- Waitakere Hospital (36.8702993°S 174.6280573°E) in Henderson has 283 beds and provides geriatric, children's health, mental health, maternity and medical services.
- He Puna Waiora (36.7799065°S 174.7542401°E) in Takapuna has 35 beds and provides mental health services.
- Elective Surgery Centre (36.782243°S 174.753698°E) in Takapuna has 30 beds and provides surgical services.
- Wilson Centre (36.7998837°S 174.7858688°E) in Hauraki has 26 beds and provides physical and children's health services.

=== Private hospitals ===
- Southern Cross Hospital North Harbour (36.7700676°S 174.7303662°E) in Wairau Valley has 59 beds and provides surgical and medical services.
- Hospice North Shore (36.7750877°S 174.7264888°E) in Takapuna has 14 beds and provides medical services.
- Helensville Birthing Centre (36.6753745°S 174.449034°E) in Helensville has five] beds and provides maternity services.
- Wellsford Birthing Unit (36.2925215°S 174.5224384°E) in Wellsford has two beds and provides maternity services.
