= Michael Plank =

New Zealand mathematical modeller

Michael Plank FRSNZ
- Born: Michael John Plank; 1979 (age 46–47)
- Education: University of Leeds
- Known for: Biological modelling during the COVID-19 pandemic
- Scientific career
- Fields: Applied mathematics; Biological modelling
- Workplaces: University of Canterbury
- Thesis: Cell-based models of tumour angiogenesis (2003)
- Doctoral advisor: Brian Sleeman
- Website: University profile

Michael John Plank FRSNZ (born 1979) is a New Zealand mathematician. Born and educated in England, he is a professor in mathematics and statistics at the University of Canterbury, and a principal investigator at Te Pūnaha Matatini. Plank's research has focused on mechanistic mathematical and stochastic models and areas of expertise include ecological and social networks, population dynamics, epidemiological models and marine ecosystems. His work has included developing and applying models to the balanced managing of fishing sites, revitalisation of endangered languages and invasive plant and weed impact. As a co-Lead for Covid-19 Modelling Aotearoa, a research programme established initially under Te Pūnaha Matatini but independent since 2021, he came to prominence as a COVID-19 modeller and frequent commentator in the media during the COVID-19 pandemic in New Zealand. Plank has received several awards in recognition of contributions to the field of applied mathematics, particularly for his explanations of how mathematical modelling can benefit social and ecological environments and concerns.

== Early life and education ==
Plank grew up in Hathersage, an English village in the Peak District. His interest for mathematics developed when he was at primary school. Plank received a Bachelor of Science with honours from the University of Bristol in 2000, and, three years later, a PhD in applied mathematics from the University of Leeds. The title of his thesis was Cell-based models of tumour angiogenesis, with Brian Sleeman as his supervisor.

== Career ==
Plank took a post-doctoral fellowship at the University of Canterbury at the beginning of 2004, attracted to New Zealand by his love of mountains and tramping. He liked the country's lifestyle and secured a position as a lecturer at the same university beginning in the 2006 academic year, rising to the rank of full professor. He is also a principal investigator at Te Pūnaha Matatini, and since 2021, a Co-Lead for Covid-19 Modelling Aotearoa, an independent research programmed funded by the Ministry of Health (New Zealand).

== Commentary on modelling theories ==
=== Movement models ===
Plank has contributed to the debate about the limitations and possibilities for two different movement models: the composite correlated random walk; and the Lévy walk. In 2008, Plank co-authored a review paper that explored the mathematics behind the random walks model used to understand the biological processes of the movement of animals, micro-organisms and cells. The paper noted that some of these basic models had limitations due to confusion in the literature between patterns that were observed and the underlying processes that may have generated them. The paper concluded random walk models allowed the systematic identification of these underlying mechanisms. A further study in the same year presented a composite search model for non-destructive foraging behaviour based on Brownian motion compared to the Lévy walk. While it was shown that distinguishing between the two models might be difficult based on data in practice, the paper concluded that a "mathematical expression" had shown the "composite search model provides higher foraging efficiency than the Lévy model". The conclusion from the paper was that the composite search model provided higher foraging efficiency than the Lévy model, a finding also confirmed in a 2011 paper co-authored by Plank. By 2015, a research project in which Plank participated, presented a method that could differentiate between the two models using a simulation study and possible likelihood functions including for a possible hidden Markov chain. In the Summary, the study concluded [that] "by providing the means to differentiate between the two most prominent search models in the literature, and a framework that could be extended to include other models, we facilitate further research into the strategies animals use to find resource".

=== Nestedness ===
Plank was part of a team that challenged the view nestedness increased the accuracy of a model to predict the survival of a specific species, and proposed that a "simpler metric—the number of mutualistic partners a species has—is a much better predictor of individual species survival and hence, community persistence". The research team examined previous data and applied "computational and statistical methods to 59 empirical datasets representing mutualistic plant-pollinator networks..[which they said could]...disprove the accepted theory of nestedness". Plank stated:

Real-life networks, whether they are from ecology, economics, or Facebook, can be large and complex. This makes it difficult to tease apart causal relationships from confounding factors. This is where mathematical models come into their own. They allow us to systematically change one network attribute, such as nestedness, whilst controlling for other variables.

Two biological scientists disputed this conclusion publishing data that showed a positive relationship between nestedness and persistence, and James et al. cited data in a response that concluded "[while]...nestedness is an interesting abstract network property that undoubtedly influences the statistical behaviour of large systems of differential equations...general conclusions allowing nestedness to be used as a predictor of empirical biodiversity cannot currently be justified".

== Selected research ==
=== Balanced harvesting of commercial fishing ===
In 2013, Plank suggested there needed to be a change in the way fish were caught commercially. He proposed a mathematically- based model to introduce "balanced harvesting...[with]...less emphasis on catching big fish...[and more on]...catching a balanced cross-section". This supported the findings in an earlier research paper, co-authored by Plank, which explained that while the reasoning to protect small fish was to reduce the risk of damaging the life cycle, because the small fish had higher productivity, they might be more resilient than large fish in sustaining possible exploitation and it could be better to "distribute fishing more widely across species and body sizes, balancing it more closely to the natural productivity of different organisms".

The research, based on population dynamics underpinning the mathematical modelling, laid the groundwork for constructive discussion on fisheries management and how practices could potentially change in future. In a paper, he published jointly in the journal Fish and Fisheries in June 2018 Plank noted:

You are tracking biomass around an ecosystem in which there are predators and prey, big fish and small fish. You can then study the consequences of both predation and fishing and track the loss of biomass out of the ecosystem using different variables,...[and by comparing]...balanced harvesting with current fishing strategies [find] that balanced harvesting can mitigate that impact by reducing the number of large fish being caught.

While the idea did receive support, there was also some criticism and Plank co-authored a paper that examined the theory, evidence and legality of balanced harvest and the degree that it could limit potential jeopardizing of marine resources. It noted that the debate was ongoing but concluded balanced harvest met legal frameworks, including those for conservation, was likely to support trophic of populations and increase the yield, and if successful would lead to a "moderate reduction of biomass of all ecological groups". A further paper noted also that maximising yields and economic profits, and minimising environmental impact and biodiversity loss [was] "more of a sociopolitical question than a scientific one, and [would] clearly involve compromises".

=== Models for language transmission ===
Plank has collaborated to research strategies used to revitalise endangered languages and based on data from Wales, developed a model regarding language transmission by "dividing the population into defined proficiency categories and dynamically quantifying transition rates between categories...[to]...predict changes in proficiency levels over time and, ultimately, whether a given endangered language is on a long-term trajectory towards extinction or recovery". Te reo Māori, the indigenous language of New Zealand, was a case study and using census data, the findings suggested that te reo Māori was on a "pathway towards extinction", but there were strategies that could restore the language "to an upward trajectory", with the research paper concluding:

Possible government measures [included] the provision of language-medium early childhood education; integration of the language into the primary and secondary school curriculum; development of the quantity and quality of teachers; investment in language-immersion education as a crucial avenue for the development of proficiency.

=== Modelling invasive species and weed impact ===
Plank was an Associate Investigator for the NZ Institute of Mathematics and its Applications (NZIMA)-funded Canterbury Research programme on Modelling Invasive Species and Weed Impact, which recognised that "invasive, non-native plants are a major component of global environmental change...[and aimed to]... "determine the optimal use of resources between the competing demands of controlling existing weeds and stopping new weeds, thus minimising the negative impacts on indigenous biodiversity and ecosystem processes". The project began with a workshop in 2007 that was attended by 51 international mathematicians, statisticians and ecologists.

== COVID-19 response in New Zealand ==
=== Modelling ===
During the COVID-19 pandemic, Plank applied his expertise to modelling the disease in New Zealand, and was a frequent media commentator. As a mathematical modelling expert in infectious diseases, Plank worked with Te Pūnaha Matatini, a research centre hosted at the University of Auckland, leading to work with Covid-19 Modelling Aotearoa, to aid the New Zealand response to COVID-19. This involved application of mathematical models to explore a series of scenarios specific to New Zealand's situation during the pandemic and to directly inform the New Zealand Government policymakers. On 25 March 2020 a state of emergency was declared in New Zealand after rising numbers of COVID cases and the country went into full lockdown. At that time, Plank, as one of the team at Te Pūnaha Matatini, co-authored a document based on simulations that had been used for a possible spread of COVID-19 in New Zealand and the model results allowed for a cautious conclusion that strategies to suppress the spread of the virus had two key benefits: "(1) it may be possible to delay the epidemic for long enough that a vaccine and/or effective treatment become widely available in NZ; and (2) it allows NZ to learn from rapidly unfolding events in other countries. This could include learning which mitigation strategies are most successful, and how to ensure timing of control interventions is robust to uncertainty".

In April 2020, Plank was part of the team that published a document explaining the stochastic model they had used to investigate containment and elimination scenarios for COVID-19 for the country. It was suggested that with low numbers, "population-wide control methods combined with efficient tracing, testing, and case isolation, offer the opportunity for New Zealand to contain and eliminate COVID-19". A later review of the modelling for the first lockdown in New Zealand provided the background of the mathematical model used to inform the government's response and guiding policy. It showed that the models provided advice on how effectively the contract tracing system was working, the managing of risk from international arrivals in quarantine facilities and the predicted number of infected cases and likelihood of spread to the regions at the time of the second outbreak in August 2020. The paper concluded that well-funded systems to build mathematical modelling experience and the related structures to support the operation of these, will increase the capacity of New Zealand to manage infectious diseases and preparedness for possible future pandemics.

In September 2020, Plank co-authored an article on a study that had aimed to estimate inequities in COVID infection fatality rates (IFR) in New Zealand by ethnicity. After making adjustments for different age groups, unmet healthcare needs and comorbidities, the study concluded that infection mortality rates for Māori were estimated to be 50% higher than that of non-Māori and "there [were] likely to be significant inequities in the health burden from COVID-19 in New Zealand by ethnicity...exacerbated by racism within the healthcare system and other inequities not reflected in official data... and should be included in future disease incidence and impact modelling".

In May 2021, the research team used a branching process model to factor in age and level of access to healthcare into scenarios to provide information concerning contact and infection rates across different demographic groups to inform possible policy interventions. The risk of increased transmission rates amongst children returning to school was predicted as low, but evidence showed a high risk of undetected outbreaks occurring in communities with low access to healthcare and a high degree of social isolation. The paper concluded that the greater the inequity and social segregation, the longer it would take to detect outbreaks, and "well-established evidence for health inequities, particularly in accessing primary healthcare and testing, indicat[ed] that Māori and Pacific peoples [were] at a higher risk of undetected outbreaks in Aotearoa New Zealand".

The team later published an article that showed the development of a model to investigate the importance of contract tracing in reducing the effective reproduction number in those in quarantine and isolation. The researchers concluded "results show[ed] that a high-quality, rapid contact tracing system, combined with strong support for people in quarantine or isolation, [could] be highly effective in reducing the spread of COVID-19...[and]...improving the speed and capacity of contact tracing systems [was] likely to be more cost-effective than prolonged population-wide social distancing measures, although some level of social distancing may be also be needed to contain a resurgence".

By June 2021, modelling from Te Pūnaha Matatini calculated that it was likely vaccination rates of around 97% for New Zealanders would be necessary to reach herd immunity against the most infectious [variants of the virus. Plank explained that the more transmissible a variant of the virus was, the greater coverage of vaccine was needed, and once there were high levels of vaccination, the New Zealand borders could gradually be opened up. He also predicted that when about 75 per cent of the population was vaccinated, there would be a reductions in hospitalisations and deaths but warned this may not be the case in some regions with low vaccination rates.

=== Commentary ===
In June 2021, when it was confirmed that a person infected with the Delta variant had visited Wellington, Plank was one of several experts including Dr Jemma Geoghegan who was asked to comment on the variant. Plank said data from around the world showed that the virus could spread after just brief contact and it had the potential to grow exponentially and be difficult to contain with a lockdown. It also carried a heightened risk of hospitalisation, but data from the UK had shown that the Pfizer vaccine was highly effective against the variant and the measures in place in New Zealand to control COVID-19 in general would still work with Delta while vaccination rates are improved.

When New Zealand went into full lockdown following a case of the Delta variant in August 2021, Plank said this was the correct move because it allowed time to see results of testing and contact tracing and there was no clear link to the border. He noted that vaccination would slow the outbreak, but coverage was not high enough to have a significant effect.

In October 2021, as the New Zealand Government outlined the plan to ease restrictions in Auckland, Plank noted that this was a very uncertain part of the pandemic and the proposed changes indicated a move from the "relative certainty of the elimination phase into the stage where we are seeing increasing cases in the community, and we are relying on a combination of restrictions and the vaccine to keep a lid on case numbers as we get more people vaccinated". He expressed concerns that if the virus got out of Auckland, it could have devastating effects on vulnerable communities that had low rates of vaccination, and concluded that "any further loosening of restrictions until we have got a picture of what the consequence of the most recent easing was could potentially cause things to spiral very rapidly".

The New Zealand Prime Minister Jacinda Ardern announced that Auckland would end its lockdown on 3 December 2021 as the country moved into the COVID-19 Protection Framework (also known as the Traffic Light warning system), and Plank recommended that people going out of Auckland for holidays should consider "not visiting regions or communities with low vaccination rates...[and warned]...once schools and workplaces go back in the new year, the virus will be able to spread more easily and there is a danger that case numbers could take off with multiple outbreaks across the country". After initially expressing concerns that the easing of restrictions was risky, Plank said that the move to Red on the traffic light framework, was reasonable because of the good vaccination rates in the city and evidence that case numbers had levelled and hospitalisations were manageable. He cautioned, however, it was important to address gaps in vaccine coverage as "the virus will find and exploit these gaps so we must redouble our efforts to fill them". Plank had earlier stated that New Zealand had been able to re-define elimination in practice as zero tolerance for transmission of the virus in the community and this move to a suppression approach was likely to result in greater freedoms for New Zealand citizens and a more managed border control because of good vaccination rates [which were] "cutting the R number to around half what it would be with no vaccine...[and because the country had]...access to the vaccine before being exposed to the virus is a luxury people in most countries didn't have".

On 13 December 2021, with the possibility of the Omicron variant reaching New Zealand, Plank told Radio New Zealand that despite there needing to be more data to assess the severity of the variant, its high transmissibility and potential to more readily infect people already vaccinated, was a concern. He suggested there was a case to review plans to re-open the borders early in 2022, and that there would be a greater level of protections with higher numbers of people getting a booster dose of the vaccine. As cases of Omicron increased in Sydney, Plank later said that a case in the New Zealand community would require a really "intensive contact tracing operation around it, and there may be a case for additional restrictions on top of that...[because]...the ability of Omicron to infect people who have had both doses of the vaccine is significantly higher than for Delta".

On 4 July 2022, Plank described the rapid spread of BA.5 variant cases throughout New Zealand in July as a second wave of COVID-19 infections. He estimated that the BA.5 variant would overtake the BA.2 variant as the dominant variant in a matter of weeks.

=== Pandemic health policy ===
While New Zealand was in a consolidation phase following the management of further lockdowns in Auckland in August 2020 and February 2021, Plank considered the implications of the 2020 Government's budget to manage future pandemics. While acknowledging that the response to COVID-19 had resulted in economic benefits as a result of some businesses being able to operate, it had exposed that the health system was underfunded, frontline healthcare workers needed better pay and there were entrenched inequities in the system that had contributed to Māori experiencing disproportionate outcomes from COVID-19. Other challenges identified as needing considerable Government funding included resourcing a strong vaccine roll out underpinned by a campaign to combat increased organised misinformation, and more funding for research and upgraded systems to gather and share data. Plank concluded that what was needed was: "A long-term plan to invest in people and infrastructure will hopefully mean we are better placed to respond to the next pandemic."

In response to a suggestion that the tourism sector had been 'abandoned' during the pandemic in New Zealand, Plank acknowledged that not allowing fully vaccinated overseas visitors into the country before May 2022 had been a source of frustration for tourism. But he concluded that measures at the border should remain in the short term and that the cautious approach to easing border restrictions showed a managed transition away from the previous strategy of elimination, stressing the importance of a good vaccine uptake and careful attention to identifying possible new variants.

When the New Zealand Government acknowledged in January 2022 that the Omicron COVID-19 variant was likely to be circulating within the country, Plank said that while the modelling suggested possible widespread infection, public health measures and high rates of vaccination may lower these figures. He later said that maintaining health services and supply chains would require careful management of the isolation periods for those infected with Omicron and warned of the risk of people returning to work while still infectious.

By April 2022, as New Zealand eased some of the COVID-19 restrictions and allowed people to gather in unlimited numbers, Plank said it appeared that the country had "flattened the curve of this Omicron wave", and the efforts in preventing the spread so far had meant less strain on the healthcare system.

On 14 August 2023, Ayesha Verrall announced that the New Zealand Government was removing all remaining COVID-19 public health requirements. In the light of this, Plank co-authored an article on 24 August 2023 that acknowledged while the disease had become endemic, mathematical modelling showed that there was still a risk of new variants that could prove difficult to manage. The article explained how a mathematical model could show disease transmission, but this process was complicated in reality because populations were not homogenous and infections vary in different groups in society. The article noted interventions targeting vulnerable groups and widespread uptake of vaccines remained effective measures for preventing severe disease, but there was no guarantee [that] "a reduction in the number of infectious contacts [would] translate to an equivalent reduction in infection rates", concluding that having a focus on decreasing the number of infections, needed to be cost effective because of a "range of healthcare needs competing for limited resources".

== Memberships ==
Plank is a member of the NZ Prime Minister's Chief Science Advisor expert panel Towards a vision for fisheries in New Zealand in 2040.

Plank has been an active member of Australia and New Zealand Industrial and Applied Mathematics (ANZIAM) since 2010 when he was an Associate Editor for the ANZIAM Journal, and has represented ANZIAM on the Board of the International Council of Industrial and Applied Mathematics (ICIAM) since 2016. In 2019 he led the development and implementation of a Code of Conduct for the ANZIAM Society and the Terms of Reference for the ANZIAM Nominations Committee which aimed to ensure a diverse pool of high-quality nominations for ANZIAM awards and their evaluation in a transparent and unbiased manner. and chair from 2020.

Plank is the 2021–present International Subject Editor for the journal Applied Mathematical Modelling.

Plank has been an Observer to the Global Partnership on Artificial Intelligence: Pandemic Response Subgroup from 2020–present. As a Working Group member, Plank was acknowledged as contributing to two publications.

== Awards ==
In April 2021, Plank was one of 24 members of the team from Te Pūnaha Matatini awarded the 2020 Prime Minister's Science Prize for their efforts to understand and communicate the pandemic.

Also in 2021, he was awarded the Australia and New Zealand Industrial and Applied Mathematics (ANZIAM) E. O. Tuck Medal. It was noted that "Professor Plank [had] been especially effective and diligent in taking time to explain the mathematical modelling and analysis behind the Government's science-based response to Covid-19 to New Zealanders via the media".

Plank was the co-recipient, with Alex James, of the University of Canterbury Research Medal in 2021. He acknowledged that "the research was very much a joint effort involving a team of scientists who stepped up when they were needed most", and University of Canterbury Deputy Vice-Chancellor of Research and Innovation Professor Ian Wright said:

Their world-beating research and deep engagement with the Government has had significant health and social impacts. They have combined pioneering science, clear communication and lightning speed to keep pace with the challenges of a rapidly evolving pandemic. They've also played a role in providing leading science communication.

Plank was one of a group of 100 Kiwibank New Zealand Local Hero Medalists who in 2021 were recognised as "exceptional and diverse Kiwis, each taking extraordinary action to better our communities and Aotearoa....[who]... pitched in to feed families affected by lockdowns, rebuilt communities and supported rangatahi...[and had]... meaningful impact in their respective communities".

In March 2025 Plank was elected as a Fellow of the Royal Society Te Apārangi for "being an international expert in mathematical modelling of complex systems in biology and epidemiology".
