= Michael Baker (epidemiologist) =

New Zealand epidemiologist

Michael Baker MNZM FRSNZ
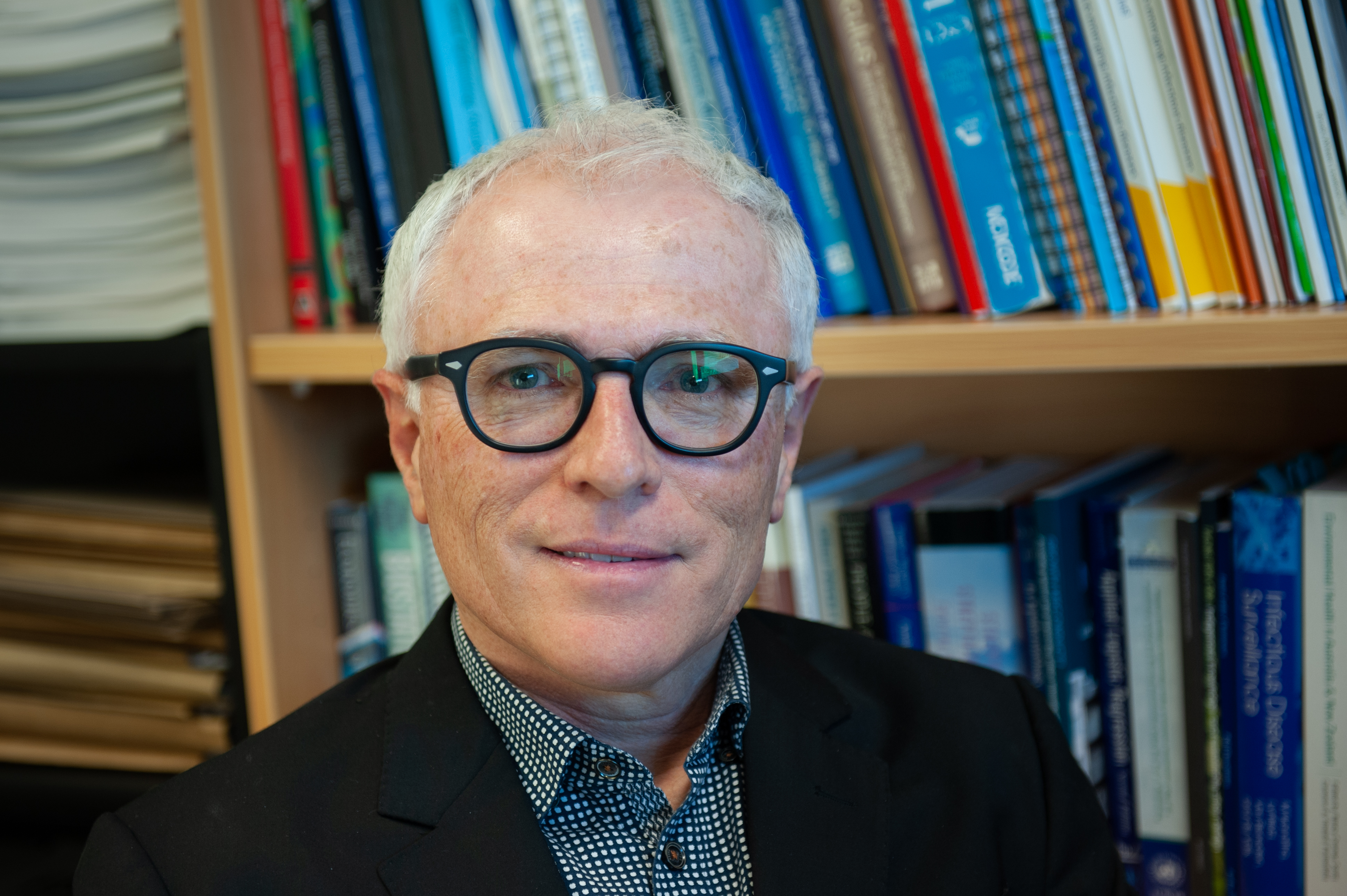
- Baker in 2020
- Born: Michael George Baker
- Citizenship: New Zealand
- Board member of: New Zealand Drug Foundation

Academic background
- Education: University of Otago; University of Auckland

Academic work
- Discipline: Epidemiology; Public health
- Institutions: University of Otago

Michael George Baker MNZM FRSNZ is a New Zealand epidemiologist. He is a professor of public health at the University of Otago. Baker has worked as an advisor and member of multiple organisations. Notably, Baker was formerly a member of the New Zealand Food Safety Authority's Academy and of the New Zealand Ministry of Health's Pandemic Influenza Technical Advisory Group (PITAG). He was later a member of the Ministry of Health's Covid-19 Response Technical Advisory Group (TAG) and Pandemic Science Advisory Group.

== Early life ==
Baker has an identical twin brother, David, who is a general practitioner in Sydney, Australia. The twins are the eldest of four children. They attended secondary school in Hamilton and medical school at the University of Auckland. Michael Baker graduated with Bachelor of Medicine, Bachelor of Surgery (MBChB) and Diploma in Obstetrics from the University of Auckland.

He subsequently studied at the University of Otago, where he earned a Diploma in Public Health followed by specialist training in public health medicine (Fellow of the Australasian Faculty of Public Health Medicine and Fellow of the New Zealand College of Public Health Medicine).

== Career ==
He originally wanted to specialise in emergency medicine or psychiatry, but got a job in Wellington as a medical advisor for the Minister of Health. In that role he worked on the response to the HIV/AIDS epidemic, and helped to set up a needle exchange programme. That work introduced him to the impact of effective public health interventions and he decided to pursue a career in public health.

He subsequently worked at the Institute of Environmental Science and Research (ESR). There he led work to improve surveillance of infectious diseases and the investigation and control of outbreaks. A particular focus was on the emerging epidemic of meningococcal disease which showed a strong association with poverty and household crowding.

=== University of Otago ===
He was appointed to the faculty at the University of Otago in 1997, rising to the rank of professor in the Department of Public Health at the University of Otago, Wellington in 2013.

He is the director of the Public Health Communication Centre which was launched in February 2023.

Baker is also director of the Health Protection Aotearoa Research Centre (HPARC).

He has campaigned to reduce campylobacter contamination in chicken in New Zealand.

=== COVID-19 pandemic ===
In January 2020, Baker began to read reports about the COVID-19 outbreak in China, and he was asked to join the Ministry of Health's COVID-19 Technical Advisory Group. In February 2020 he was advocating with colleagues at the University of Otago to 'stamp out' COVID-19 in New Zealand and keep it out, rather than trying to 'flatten the curve'. The Government eventually introduced a countrywide lockdown.

In March 2020, Baker prepared what became the world’s first published COVID-19 elimination strategy. In response to rising case numbers, the Government introduced a countrywide lockdown to control the pandemic.

In April 2020, Baker stated that New Zealand had the "most decisive and strongest lockdown in the world at the moment" and that it is the only Western country where the goal is to eliminate COVID-19. Baker thinks we will look back on COVID-19 as "the most profound public health intervention in our history".

Baker provided scientific research and commentary on COVID-19 throughout the pandemic. He described the shift from elimination, to suppression and mitigation strategies.

With colleagues from the University of Otago, Wellington, he was an early advocate for the use of masks to reduce transmission. He subsequently contributed to an extensive international review showing the high level of effectiveness of respirator-style masks (notably N95) if they are worn.

In October 2021, Baker advocated a regional approach to countering the Delta variant outbreak in Auckland that began in August 2021. He argued that a regional approach would allow Auckland to pursue a suppression approach while the rest of the country could continue with an elimination strategy.

In November 2021, Baker and several fellow University of Otago academics including Dr Lucy Telfar Barnard, Dr Jennifer Summers, and Lesley Gray criticised the Managed Isolation and Quarantine (MIQ) system's requirement that vaccinated travellers be tested as "inconsistent and arbitrary," asserting that they posed a lower risk of contracting COVID-19 than Aucklanders during the Delta variant.

In December 2021, Baker expressed concerns that the Government's new COVID-19 Protection Framework ("traffic light system") in and abandonment of internal borders could lead to a rise in cases but added that the infection could be blunted by vaccination efforts and the warmer summer weather. He credited vaccination, contact tracing and the previous Alert Level 3 lockdown with helping to combat the spread of the virus in 2021. In mid-December, Baker suggested that the arrival of SARS-CoV-2 Omicron variant might force the Government to delay its planned reopening of New Zealand's borders in January 2022. He also stated that New Zealand was one of the few countries alongside Taiwan, China and some Australian states to have a "robust border quarantine system."

In early January 2022, Baker questioned the effectiveness of the "traffic light system" in dealing with Omicron community outbreaks and has advocated localised lockdowns. He has also expressed support for the Government's moves to lower the waiting period between second vaccines doses and booster shots from six to four months and encouraged the vaccination of children.

In February 2022, Baker expressed concerns that the Ministry of Health's daily COVID-19 reports underestimated infections within the community since many of the infected took several days to develop symptoms of COVID-19. He also credited the country's "traffic light settings" and contact tracing efforts with slowing the spread of COVID-19 in comparison to overseas.

In early September 2022, Baker advocated scrapping the "traffic light system" in favour of moving the country towards a "more straightforward system." Baker's remarks accompanies reports that the Government was considering abandoning the "traffic light system" when it reviewed New Zealand's COVID-19 settings later in the month.

In mid-October 2022, Baker advocated the reinstatement of a form of the alert level system after the country reported its first case of the Omicron subvariant BQ.1.1 on 13 October.

In early November 2022, Baker advocated reinstating mask requirements for public transportation and flights to combat rising COVID-19 hospitalisation and death rates caused by the third wave of COVID-19 sweeping through New Zealand in 2022.

On 10 April 2023, Baker urged the New Zealand Government to retain the few remaining COVID-19 restrictions including the mandatory seven-day isolation period for positive cases and mask wearing at hospitals. In response to rising case numbers, hospitalisations and deaths reported on 17 April, Baker stated that New Zealand was experiencing its fourth wave of COVID-19 infections. Baker advocated encouraging people to get the new Covid vaccine booster, isolate if they are infected, and wear facemasks in poorly ventilated environments.

On 6 March 2026, Baker said that New Zealand was in its ninth COVID-19 wave, with Health New Zealand reporting 50 hospitalisations in the previous week. He said that New Zealand had experienced roughly two COVID-19 waves per year over the past four years. Baker attributed the recent COVID wave to a decline in COVID immunity caused by declining vaccination rates and testing since they were no longer provided freely by the Government.

== Honours and awards ==
In 2013, Baker was awarded the HRC Liley Medal for his contribution to the health and medical sciences. He was a joint recipient of the Shorland Medal in 2019 for his work with the SHIVERS team of influenza researchers.

In the 2021 New Year Honours, Baker was appointed a Member of the New Zealand Order of Merit, for services to public health science.

Baker received the 2020 Prime Minister's Science Communication Prize, recognising his 2000+ interviews on COVID-19 since January 2020. He was awarded the 2021 Cranwell Medal for science communication by the New Zealand Association of Scientists. In 2022, he was awarded the Callaghan Medal by the Royal Society Te Apārangi for "science-informed commentary on the Covid-19 pandemic and other major public health issues in Aotearoa New Zealand". In 2026, Baker was elected a Fellow of the Royal Society Te Apārangi.

== Personal life ==
Baker lives in Brooklyn, Wellington, with his family.

== The Big House ==
Baker owns The Big House, a notable 21 room property constructed in the 1870s in Parnell, Auckland. In 1981, Baker, a then–medical student living in the attic, purchased the run–down house to prevent its likely demolition upon the Mercep family trust's decision for its sale. Later, Baker established a unique living arrangement, creating a house constitution that employs consensus decision–making and regular house meetings.

The Big House was built in the mid–1870s for now–dissolved Melmerly Collegiate School for girls. Former notable students include Princess Te Puea Hērangi and aviator Jean Batten. Since Baker's acquisition of the property, the house has been subject to media coverage due to notable residents and events such as a balcony collapse in 2005.

== Selected publications ==
- Baker, Michael G.; Wilson, Nick; Anglemyer, Andrew (2020). "Successful Elimination of Covid-19 Transmission in New Zealand". New England Journal of Medicine. 383 (8): e56. doi:10.1056/NEJMc2025203. ISSN 0028-4793. PMC 7449141. PMID 32767891.
- Baker, Michael; Kvalsvig, Amanda; Verrall, Ayesha; Telfar-Barnard, Lucy; Wilson, Nick (2020). "New Zealand's elimination strategy for the COVID-19 pandemic and what is required to make it work". New Zealand Medical Journal. 133: 10–14.
- Wilson, Nick; Turner, Nikki; Baker, Michael (2019). "One hundred years ago in 1919: New Zealand's birth reduction shock associated with an influenza pandemic". New Zealand Medical Journal. 132: 57–62.
- Boyd, Matt; Baker, Michael; Mansoor, Osman; Kvizhinadze, Giorgi; Wilson, Nick (2017). "Protecting an island nation from extreme pandemic threats: proof-of-concept around border closure as an intervention". PLOS ONE. 12 (6) e0178732. Bibcode:2017PLoSO..1278732B. doi:10.1371/journal.pone.0178732. PMC 5473559. PMID 28622344.
- Baker, Michael; Zhang, Jane; Blakely, Tony; Crane, Julian; Saville-Smith, Kay; Howden-Chapman, Philippa (2016). "Collaborating with a social housing provider supports a large cohort study of the health effects of housing conditions". BMC Public Health. 16 (1): 159. doi:10.1186/s12889-016-2730-9. PMC 4754881. PMID 26883320.
- Baker, Michael G.; Wilson, Nick; Blakely, Tony (2020). "Elimination could be the optimal response strategy for covid-19 and other emerging pandemic diseases" BMJ. 371:m4907 doi: https://doi.org/10.1136/bmj.m4907
