= Elsthorpe, New Zealand =

Elsthorpe
- Locality
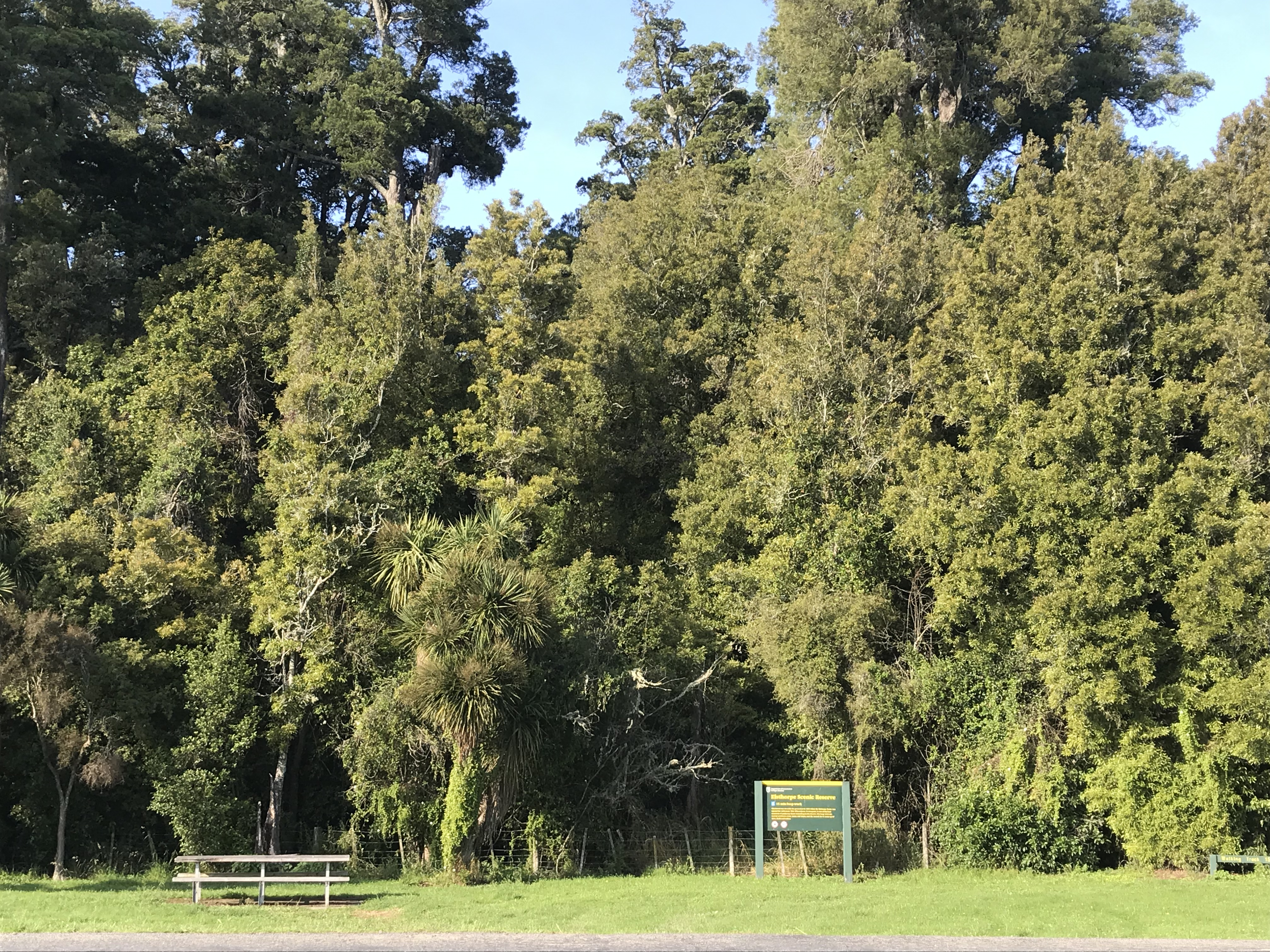
- Elsthorpe Scenic Reserve
- Interactive map of Elsthorpe
- Coordinates: 39.917°S 176.815°E
- Country: New Zealand
- Region: Hawke's Bay
- Territorial authority: Central Hawke's Bay District
- Ward: Aramoana-Ruahine
- Electorates: Tukituki; Ikaroa-Rāwhiti (Māori)

Government
  - Territorial Authority: Central Hawke's Bay District Council
  - Regional council: Hawke's Bay Regional Council
  - Mayor of Central Hawke's Bay: Will Foley
  - Tukituki MP: Catherine Wedd
  - Ikaroa-Rāwhiti MP: Cushla Tangaere-Manuel

Area
  - Total: 281.49 km^{2} (108.68 sq mi)

Population (2023 Census)
  - Total: 417
  - Density: 1.48/km^{2} (3.84/sq mi)

Elsthorpe is a village in the Central Hawke's Bay District and Hawke's Bay region of New Zealand's North Island. It is located east of Ōtāne, Waipawa and State Highway 2 and west of the east coast.

It began as a sheep station, named after Elsthorpe, a hamlet in the English county of Lincolnshire. It is now a small settlement, supporting neighbouring sheep farms.

The local St Stephen's Chapel holds five services during the year under the oversight of St Luke's Anglican Church in Havelock North. The village also features a memorial to Royal New Zealand Air Force helicopter pilot Flight Lieutenant William Waterhouse, who died in a Vietnam War training accident in Canberra in January 1969.

The Elsthorpe and neighbouring Omakere rugby union teams were featured in a New Zealand television advertisement for coverage of the 2019 Rugby World Cup.

== Demographics ==
Elsthorpe locality covers 281.49 km^{2} (108.68 sq mi). The locality is part of the Mangarara statistical area.

Historical population
Year	Pop.	±% p.a.
2006	339	—
2013	324	−0.64%
2018	369	+2.64%
2023	417	+2.48%

Elsthorpe had a population of 417 in the 2023 New Zealand census, an increase of 48 people (13.0%) since the 2018 census, and an increase of 93 people (28.7%) since the 2013 census. There were 210 males and 207 females in 156 dwellings. There were 102 people (24.5%) aged under 15 years, 45 (10.8%) aged 15 to 29, 201 (48.2%) aged 30 to 64, and 66 (15.8%) aged 65 or older.

People could identify as more than one ethnicity. The results were 92.1% European (Pākehā); 16.5% Māori; 2.2% Pasifika; 0.7% Asian; 0.7% Middle Eastern, Latin American and African New Zealanders (MELAA); and 4.3% other, which includes people giving their ethnicity as "New Zealander". English was spoken by 97.1%, Māori by 3.6%, and other languages by 5.0%. No language could be spoken by 1.4% (e.g. too young to talk). The percentage of people born overseas was 12.2, compared with 28.8% nationally.

Religious affiliations were 33.8% Christian, 0.7% New Age, and 1.4% other religions. People who answered that they had no religion were 59.7%, and 2.9% of people did not answer the census question.

Of those at least 15 years old, 72 (22.9%) people had a bachelor's or higher degree, 186 (59.0%) had a post-high school certificate or diploma, and 57 (18.1%) people exclusively held high school qualifications. 24 people (7.6%) earned over $100,000 compared to 12.1% nationally. The employment status of those at least 15 was 189 (60.0%) full-time, 51 (16.2%) part-time, and 3 (1.0%) unemployed.

== Education ==
Elsthorpe School is a Year 1-8 co-educational state primary school. It is a decile 9 school with a roll of 36 as of July 2026. It opened in 1898.
