= Ōmakere =

Farming locality in New Zealand

- Town
- Interactive map of Ōmakere
- Coordinates: 40.050849°S 176.754430°E
- Country: New Zealand
- Region: Hawke's Bay
- Territorial authority: Central Hawke's Bay District
- Ward: Aramoana-Ruahine
- Electorates: Wairarapa; Ikaroa-Rāwhiti (Māori)

Government
  - Territorial Authority: Central Hawke's Bay District Council
  - Regional council: Hawke's Bay Regional Council
  - Mayor of Central Hawke's Bay: Will Foley
  - Wairarapa MP: Mike Butterick
  - Ikaroa-Rāwhiti MP: Cushla Tangaere-Manuel

Area
  - Total: 448.82 km^{2} (173.29 sq mi)

Population (2023 Census)
  - Total: 561
  - Density: 1.25/km^{2} (3.24/sq mi)

Ōmakere (previously spelt Omakere) is a farming locality in the Central Hawke's Bay District and Hawke's Bay region of New Zealand's North Island. It is located east of Waipawa.

Ōmakere translates as place (Ō) someone was lost or died (makere).

The Omakere Church includes a stained glass memorial wall, depicting Jesus Christ's crucifixion, in memory of three local men who died in war.

The Omakere and neighbouring Elsthorpe rugby union teams were featured in a New Zealand television advertisement for coverage of the 2019 Rugby World Cup.

== Demographics ==
Ōmakere locality covers 448.82 km^{2} (173.29 sq mi). The locality is part of the Mangarara statistical area.

Historical population for Ōmakere locality
Year	Pop.	±% p.a.
2006	552	—
2013	468	−2.33%
2018	543	+3.02%
2023	561	+0.65%
The 2006 population is for a larger area of 464.71 km^{2}. Source:

Ōmakere had a population of 561 in the 2023 New Zealand census, an increase of 18 people (3.3%) since the 2018 census, and an increase of 93 people (19.9%) since the 2013 census. There were 282 males and 273 females in 225 dwellings. 2.1% of people identified as LGBTIQ+. There were 114 people (20.3%) aged under 15 years, 87 (15.5%) aged 15 to 29, 255 (45.5%) aged 30 to 64, and 105 (18.7%) aged 65 or older.

People could identify as more than one ethnicity. The results were 89.3% European (Pākehā), 18.7% Māori, 1.6% Pasifika, 1.6% Asian, and 7.5% other, which includes people giving their ethnicity as "New Zealander". English was spoken by 99.5%, Māori by 1.6%, and other languages by 2.7%. No language could be spoken by 0.5% (e.g. too young to talk). New Zealand Sign Language was known by 0.5%. The percentage of people born overseas was 11.2, compared with 28.8% nationally.

Religious affiliations were 33.7% Christian, 1.6% Māori religious beliefs, and 0.5% other religions. People who answered that they had no religion were 56.1%, and 8.0% of people did not answer the census question.

Of those at least 15 years old, 105 (23.5%) people had a bachelor's or higher degree, 264 (59.1%) had a post-high school certificate or diploma, and 84 (18.8%) people exclusively held high school qualifications. 45 people (10.1%) earned over $100,000 compared to 12.1% nationally. The employment status of those at least 15 was 252 (56.4%) full-time, 75 (16.8%) part-time, and 6 (1.3%) unemployed.

=== Mangarara statistical area ===
Mangarara statistical area, which also includes Ōtāne, covers 838.07 km^{2} (323.58 sq mi) and had an estimated population of 2,940 as of June 2025, with a population density of 3.5 people per km^{2}.

Historical population for Mangarara
Year	Pop.	±% p.a.
2006	2,001	—
2013	2,076	+0.53%
2018	2,400	+2.94%
2023	2,802	+3.15%

Mangarara statistical area had a population of 2,802 in the 2023 New Zealand census, an increase of 402 people (16.8%) since the 2018 census, and an increase of 726 people (35.0%) since the 2013 census. There were 1,371 males, 1,428 females, and 6 people of other genders in 1,065 dwellings. 1.7% of people identified as LGBTIQ+. The median age was 43.2 years (compared with 38.1 years nationally). There were 582 people (20.8%) aged under 15 years, 339 (12.1%) aged 15 to 29, 1,335 (47.6%) aged 30 to 64, and 549 (19.6%) aged 65 or older.

People could identify as more than one ethnicity. The results were 86.8% European (Pākehā); 21.9% Māori; 2.1% Pasifika; 2.2% Asian; 0.5% Middle Eastern, Latin American and African New Zealanders (MELAA); and 3.2% other, which includes people giving their ethnicity as "New Zealander". English was spoken by 98.2%, Māori by 4.5%, Samoan by 0.3%, and other languages by 4.9%. No language could be spoken by 1.7% (e.g. too young to talk). New Zealand Sign Language was known by 0.5%. The percentage of people born overseas was 14.8, compared with 28.8% nationally.

Religious affiliations were 33.1% Christian, 0.1% Hindu, 0.1% Islam, 1.4% Māori religious beliefs, 0.5% New Age, and 0.6% other religions. People who answered that they had no religion were 55.7%, and 8.2% of people did not answer the census question.

Of those at least 15 years old, 441 (19.9%) people had a bachelor's or higher degree, 1,284 (57.8%) had a post-high school certificate or diploma, and 495 (22.3%) people exclusively held high school qualifications. The median income was $42,400, compared with $41,500 nationally. 204 people (9.2%) earned over $100,000 compared to 12.1% nationally. The employment status of those at least 15 was 1,203 (54.2%) full-time, 318 (14.3%) part-time, and 36 (1.6%) unemployed.

== Education ==
Omakere School is a Year 1-8 co-educational state primary school. It is a decile 8 school with a roll of 77 as of July 2026. The school opened in 1912.
