= Waipawa railway station =

Former train station in New Zealand

Coordinates: 39.9396°S 176.5932°E

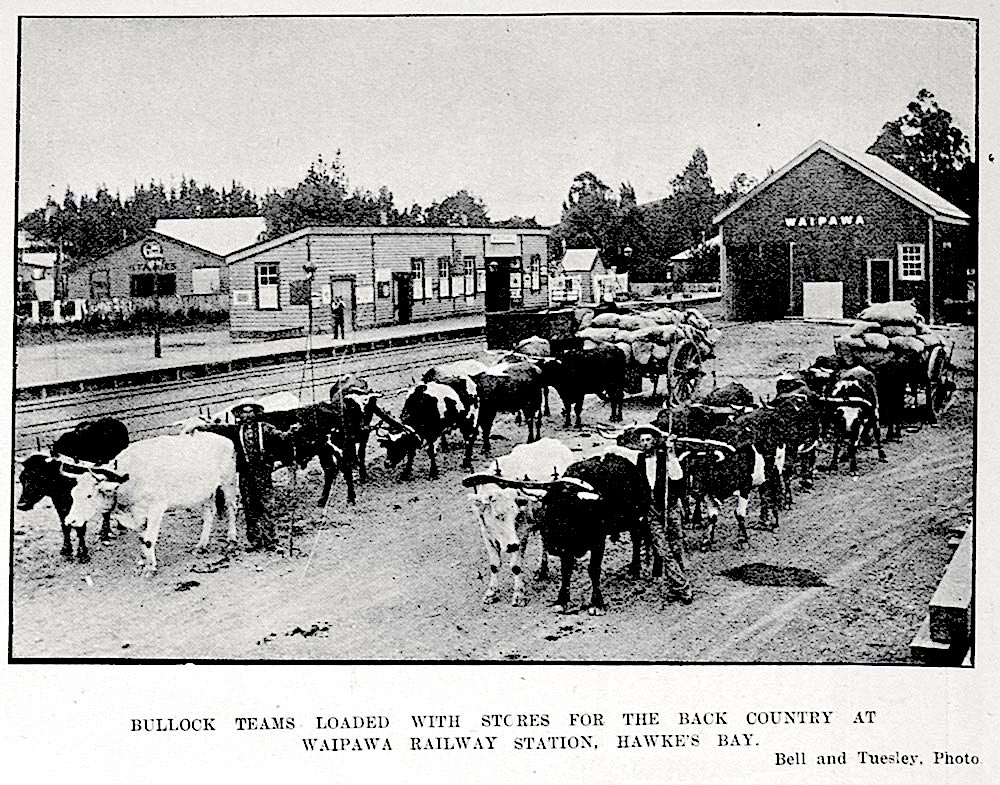
Waipawa railway station in 1905

From at least 1870 Waipawa was served by mail coaches running between Napier and Waipukurau.

On Monday 28 August 1876 the railway was extended from Te Aute to Waipawa, later becoming part of the Palmerston North–Gisborne Line. It was part of the Paki Paki to Waipukurau contract, tendered on 15 July 1874 for £19,532 by Charles McKirdy, of Wellington, who built the Rimutaka Incline and several other lines. A local contractor tendered £29,173. There were allegations of mismanagement and disputes about the contracts. For example, the work was started by the international contractor, Brogdens. However, in 1876, the Minister for Public Works, Edward Richardson, attributed delays only to unexpectedly heavy land claims and floods. S Tracey and Allen, of Napier, tendered £7,989 for track for the Paki Paki-Waipawa length in September 1875, but they lost the contract in May 1876, due to slow progress. Waipawa started with 2 trains a day in each direction, increased to 3 in 1883 and 4 in 1896. Waipawa had 7 trains a day in 1940.

Waipawa was the terminus for 3 days, until a 4 mi 62.93 ch (7.703 km) extension to Waipukurau opened on 1 September 1876. The contract for laying the track for the 28.58 km (17.76 mi) southerly extension of the line to Takapau was advertised in April 1876. The line to Waipukurau was built by Brogdens for £9,469 7s 9d. Donald Ross built the 60 ft (18 m) bridges over the Waipawa and Tukituki Rivers for £23,410. In 1875 construction of the Waipawa bridge, just south of Waipawa, was delayed by timber supplies. The bridge was strengthened in 1911 and rebuilt in 1939. About 13 February 2023 the small Harker Street bridge 176, just to the north of the 305 m (1,001 ft) Waipawa Bridge 175, was washed away during Cyclone Gabrielle. Other parts of the town were also flooded. The bridge was first to be repaired and the line to Hastings reopened on 3 April.

When the station opened, McLeod's contract for a 5th class stationmaster's house had been completed in October 1875 and Richard Phillips' contract for the station buildings by 22 March 1876. Following the opening Richard Phillips extended the station over the next couple of years. By 1896 Waipawa had a 4th class station, platform (12 ft (3.7 m) wide in 1912), cart approach to platform, 40 ft (12 m) x 30 ft (9.1 m) goods shed, loading bank, cattle yards, stationmaster's house, urinals and a passing loop for 42 wagons, extended to 49 by 1911 and 80 in 1940. Fires damaged the station in 1896 and 1899. In 1905 Richard Phillips rebuilt the station and goods shed. Railway houses were built in 1905 and 1928. A verandah was added in 1908 and can be seen in a 1913 photo. In 1912 an automatic tablet exchanger was added, by which time the lean-to station had luggage and parcels rooms, an office, vestibule, ladies waiting room and a 1½ ton crane. By 1914 the goods shed has been doubled in length. Electricity was connected in 1928. In the annual returns of traffic, Waipawa was one of the medium sized stations on the line. For example, in 1925 it sold 15,446 tickets and handled 74,062 pigs and sheep.

On 6 December 1981 the station closed to passengers, it was an unattended station from 20 November 1983, closed to all but parcels on 18 August 1984 and closed completely on 2 November 1984. By 1987 only a platform and goods shed remained. The platform, goods shed and a single track still remain.

	Former adjoining stations	
Waipukurau; Line open, station closed 7.52 km (4.67 mi) towards PN	Palmerston North–Gisborne Line	Ōtāne; Line open, station closed 5.81 km (3.61 mi) towards Napier
