= Hatuma =

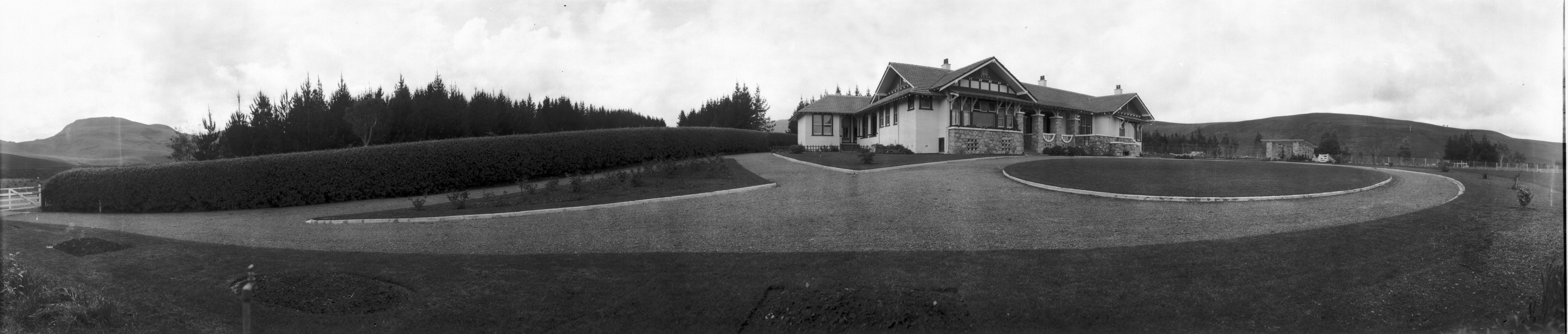
- Hinerangi House in the mid 1920s. It was designed by Napier architect Louis Hay in 1919
- Interactive map of Hatuma
- Coordinates: 40.037°S 176.489°E
- Country: New Zealand
- Region: Hawke's Bay
- Territorial authority: Central Hawke's Bay District
- Elevation: 141 m (463 ft)

Population (June 2025)
  - Total: 153

Hatuma is 7 km (4.3 mi) south of Waipukurau, in Central Hawke's Bay in the east of the North Island of New Zealand. Meshblock 7016748, which covers 19.3 km^{2} (7.5 sq mi) from the edge of Waipukurau to Maharakeke, had a population of 153 in 2018.

Hatuma was one of the ridings of Waipukurau County Council. In the 1890s controversy raged for over a decade as to whether Woburn estate should be transferred from an absentee run holder to individual farmers. The change to Hatuma was made, but a historic house and remnants of a railway station are left from those days, as well as a lake of importance for wildlife and a more recent lime quarry to the south.

== Name ==
The name is a corruption of Whatuma, which was the official name until 25 October 1951, when a petition of local residents got it changed to Hatuma.

Lake Whatumā had its official name designated on 28 August 2018. Its full name is – ‘te wāhi e mākona ai te whatumanawa o te tangata’, which translates as the place where the sustenance of people is to be satisfied. That refers to its former abundance of fish, fresh water mussels (kākahi), eels, and, in the surrounding kahikatea forest, birds, particularly kēruru.

== Lake Whatumā ==
Lake Whatumā is about 3 km (1.9 mi) south-southwest of Waipukurau. It is surrounded by pā sites; around 900 tāngata whenua lived around the lake in 1852. Between the lake and Wairakai hill many middens, tools, bones, pits, chisels and axes have been found and there were fortified pā at Te Moanairokia, Ohineiwhatūīa, Pukekaihou, Waipukurau, Ruatangaroa, Kaimanaw and Kaitoroa. Until drainage and sheep and beef farming degraded the lake in the late 1940s, the hapū from Tapairu, Whatarākai, Mataweka and Takapau did regular food-gathering at Hatuma, for tuna, kōkopu, kākahi and kererū.

The lake is a Site of Special Wildlife Interest, as it has about 36% (120) of Hawke's Bay's dabchicks (weweia) and a quarter (10) of its bitterns (matuku). It also has cattle egret, New Zealand grebe (weweia), spotless crake (pūweto) and marsh crake (koitareke). The lake has longfin and shortfin eels, common bully (toitoi), goldfish, rainbow trout and southern bell frog. Beggars tick is impeding growth of swamp nettles. Grey and crack willow are also reducing wildlife value. Other native plants include raupō, swamp sedge and leafless rush (wīwī). Since 2008 the Lake Whatumā Wetland Care Group has been removing willows and trapping pests.

The lake is oval, with a maximum depth of 0.8 m (2.6 ft) and a surface area of 160 ha (400 acres), with an additional adjacent wetland margin of around 76 ha (190 acres), which suffers from drought and flood. It is 127.5 m (418 ft) above sea level. The water level is controlled by a weir. It is a eutrophic lake, with elevated levels of total phosphorus and black phormidium cyanobacteria. Through-water visibility is only 0.2 m (7.9 in).

Whatumā is fed by several streams, the longest being Ngahape Stream. The lake is at the base of what appears to be an alluvial fan of the Tukituki River. There has been speculation since at least 1919 that the lake might once have been part of the Tukituki River. It now drains through the Kiorerau and Mangatarata streams to reach the Tukituki River.

== History ==
In 2014 100 ha (250 acres) of the lake margin was returned to Heretaunga-Tamatea hapū, when a settlement with the government recognised injustices since the 1840s.

In the late 1840s, local iwi, led by Te Hapuku, invited the Crown to acquire land, hoping to benefit from the sale and the skills of settlers. They met Donald McLean, the government's land agent, in December 1850 and, on 4 November 1851, he bought the 279,000 acres (113,000 ha) Waipukurau Block for £4,800. McLean bought at a low price and entered into secret deals, which, in 1857, led to fighting in which a number of rangatira were killed. By 1860 land sales had stopped. However, the Native Lands Act 1865 allowed purchase of reserve areas. In the 1870s, Heretaunga Tamatea rangatira established the Repudiation movement to reverse the losses. It failed; by 1900, some 1.2 of 1.4 million acres in the region had been taken. By 1930 only about 6% remained in Māori ownership. In 1896 the Prime Minister was asked to restore Māori fishing rights in Lake Whatumā.

Electric power reached the area between 1925 and 1947.

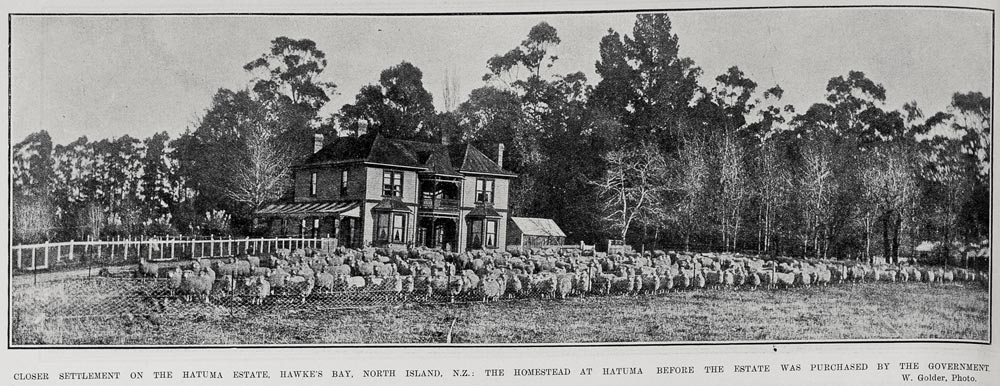
Woburn homestead in 1909

=== Woburn ===
Hatuma is on the south side of the Waipukurau Block, which extends as far as Lake Poukawa. Henry Russell set up the Mount Herbert estate, to the east of Waipukurau, and his brother, Thomas Purvis Russell (baptised 16 December 1818 at Chirnside in the Scottish Borders and normally known as Purvis; they were sons of lawyer Robert Russell and Elizabeth Purvis), took the neighbouring block, which he named Woburn. It covered 26,655 acres (10,787 ha), extending south from Waipukurau along the whole of the western side of the Ngahape valley, including Marakeke and the Turiri Range of hills to within 4 mi (6.4 km) of Takapau. Henry and Purvis also owned runs near the Tūranganui River in southern Wairarapa. Purvis arrived in Wellington from London on the New Zealand Company's 582 ton barque, Prince of Wales, on 3 January 1843, with his first visit to Hatuma in 1847. He was corresponding with the government agent, Donald McLean, in 1851.

Until the Liberal government introduced a graduated land tax under the Land and Income Assessment Act 1891 and a Lands for Settlements Act 1894, Woburn and its neighbour, Oruawharo, were extensive sheep runs and their owners had returned to Britain. Purvis Russell seems to have been at Woburn in 1858, but to have returned to Britain by 1859, for he married Mary Glass Sainsbury in Bath on 6 July. However, he returned in 1860 and their daughter, Mary Maud Russell, was born at Woburn on 11 August 1862. They left again in 1874 to live in their large house at Warroch (a mile from Dalqueich, about 30 mi (48 km) north of Edinburgh and close to the Hattonburn family home of their son in law, Henry Montgomery). They briefly returned in 1881, but were back for the marriage of their daughter in Edinburgh in 1882, There were clearly close personal and financial links between Warroch and Waipukurau, as shown in another marriage in 1883 and an advert. In 1891 he exhibited one of his merino sheep at a Kinross show.

The Liberal reforms induced them to return in 1893 and make changes. The homestead, which had burnt down in 1877, was rebuilt in 1893 for Purvis Russell and Henry Montgomery, by a local builder, W A Chambers, for £2,400 including a fireplace by a local cabinet maker, Mr Goudy, or Condie. The house was protected by a Category 2 listing on 7 April 1983 and is now a bed and breakfast business.

Although a resolution urging the government to buy the land was passed in 1886 and the first hearing of the Board of Review took place in 1892, the recommended purchase took much longer than the government expected. It was controversial and Purvis delayed it through appeals for as long as possible, until the government paid £141,618 in 1900. On 25 April 1901 some 25,737 acres (10,415 ha) were split into 54 sections on perpetual leases. 221 acres (89 ha) were for the village of Hatuma, close to the railway siding. Purvis Russell retained 700 acres (280 ha) near Waipukurau. By 1904 there were 60 farmers, a post office and a school. The former controversial owner died at Bath in 1906, leaving an estate of £257,677, including £120,000 of personal estate in New Zealand.

=== Railway station ===
Hatuma and Marakeke stations
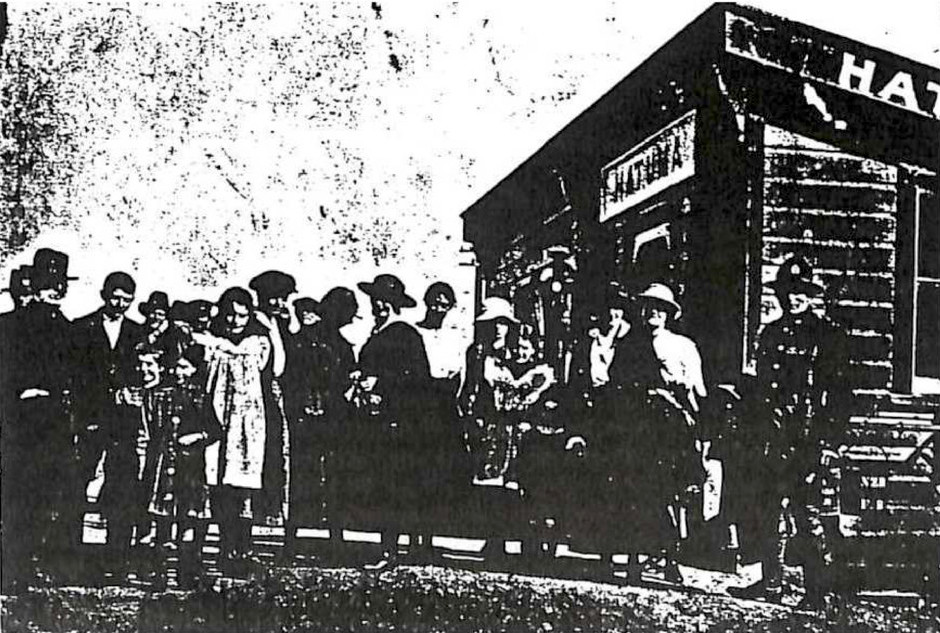
- Hatuma about 1918 – a group welcoming Private John Baxter Rice, who returned in December 1918

General information
- Elevation: Hatuma 141 m (463 ft); Marakeke 174 m (571 ft)
- System: New Zealand Government Railways (NZGR) regional rail
- Line: Palmerston North - Gisborne Line
- Platforms: Single

History
- Opened: Hatuma 1 August 1901; Marakeke 16 April 1909
- Closed: Hatuma 2 July 1977; Marakeke about 1993
- Former names: Woburn became Hatuma on 26 July 1889

Services
Preceding station	Historical railways	Following station
Takapau crossing loop Line open, station closed 4.62 km (2.87 mi) towards PN	Marakeke	Hatuma; Line open, station closed 5.4 km (3.4 mi) towards Napier
Marakeke; Line open, station closed 5.4 km (3.4 mi) towards PN	Hatuma	Waipukurau; Line open, station closed 7.26 km (4.51 mi) towards Napier
Location

In 1874 G G Allan won a £14,100 contract for the 14 mi (23 km) extension of the Napier to Waipukurau railway south to Takapau. It opened on 12 March 1877, with no stations between Waipukurau and Takapau. Later there were 3 intermediate stations, but all closed by 1993.

==== Hatuma railway station ====
A week after the line opened, on 19 March 1877, Purvis was granted a siding, 4 mi 69 ch (7.8 km) from Waipukurau, for the Woburn estate. On Friday, 20 June 1884 Woburn opened as a flag station and on 16 August 1887 the private siding for the estate was opened to the public, 50 mi 40 ch (81.3 km) from Napier. In 1888 it was recommended that a platform and shelter shed should be built. On 26 July 1889 the name was changed from Woburn to Hatuma.

Following pressure from the new settlers and their MP, Charles Hall, Hatuma reopened as a flag station on 1 August 1901. Sheep yards followed in 1902. Further improvements were pressed for in 1903 and the Dannevirke stationmaster's house was moved so that the platelayer could attend to goods at the siding. By 1904 it had a shelter shed, platform, cart road, cattle and sheep yards, 40 ft (12 m) x 30 ft (9.1 m) goods shed, loading bank, urinals and a passing loop for 26 wagons, extended to 80 in 1940. On 16 March 1904 a new station was built about 30 ch (600 m) from the original siding. Improvements were made in 1915 and a railway house was built in 1937. In the 1931 Hawke's Bay earthquake a train was derailed near Hatuma.

On 2 July 1977 the station closed. A short platform and stockyards remain.

==== Marakeke railway station ====
5.4 km (3.4 mi) to the south of Hatuma, there was a flag station at Marakeke from 16 April 1909. It was recorded as having fixed signals in 1905 and had a shelter shed, loading bank, latrines and a passing loop for 30 wagons when the station opened. By 1911 it also had a platform, cart approach and loading bank. Sheep yards were added in 1929 and access for lorries provided in 1937. By 3 August 1978, when they closed, the stockyards were overgrown and had been disused for about two years. On 27 September 1981 Marakeke closed to all traffic but private siding traffic. In 1988 it was noted there was a small modern office building, but no platform. It finally closed about 1993. The station building was moved to Marton for use as an office by the lime company. Only a single track and traces of a station yard remain.

Maharakeke Settlement is an official name, but the station was known as Marakeke and it has been spelt Maharekeke.

=== School ===
Hatuma in 1971

The school opened on 20 March 1903. By 1904 it had 37 children. Hatuma school closed and its students were moved to Flemington, between 1962 and 1971. The school was on Hatuma Road, opposite Hobson Road.

Hatuma South School opened on 1 October 1906 and closed about 1917, probably due to wartime staff shortages.

Marakeke School opened on 12 March 1912, on the corner of Waiou Road. In 1938 a proposal to close the school was withdrawn, but between 1962 and 1979 its pupils also went to Flemington.

=== Hall ===
A site for Hatuma Hall was allocated in 1906, but it opened on 24 July 1932. It was near the railway, to the west of Hobson Road. In 1998 the hall was also moved to Flemington.

== Hatuma Lime ==
Much of the Hatuma area is on Te Onepu Limestone, which is now quarried towards the southern end of Hatuma. A 1903 analysis showed that the local rocks were rich in lime. Hatuma Lime Company was registered on 22 October 1931 by a group of Wellington market gardeners looking for a high grade limestone near a railway. Its quarry on Maharakeke Rd, near the former railway station, has removed over 2 million tonnes of rock for fertiliser, now marketed as Hatuma Dicalcic Phosphate and FuturepHo. The company started Waipawa quarry on Tikokino Rd in 1957, which started manufacturing phosphate from the 1970s and took over a 1916 quarry at Mauriceville in 1977. In 1989 about 10,000 tonnes of dicalcic phosphate was railed from Hatuma to Mauriceville. A Marton distribution centre is supplied from the Hatuma quarry. A disused siding crosses Maharakeke Rd to the quarry.
