= Te Angiangi Marine Reserve =

Marine reserve in New Zealand

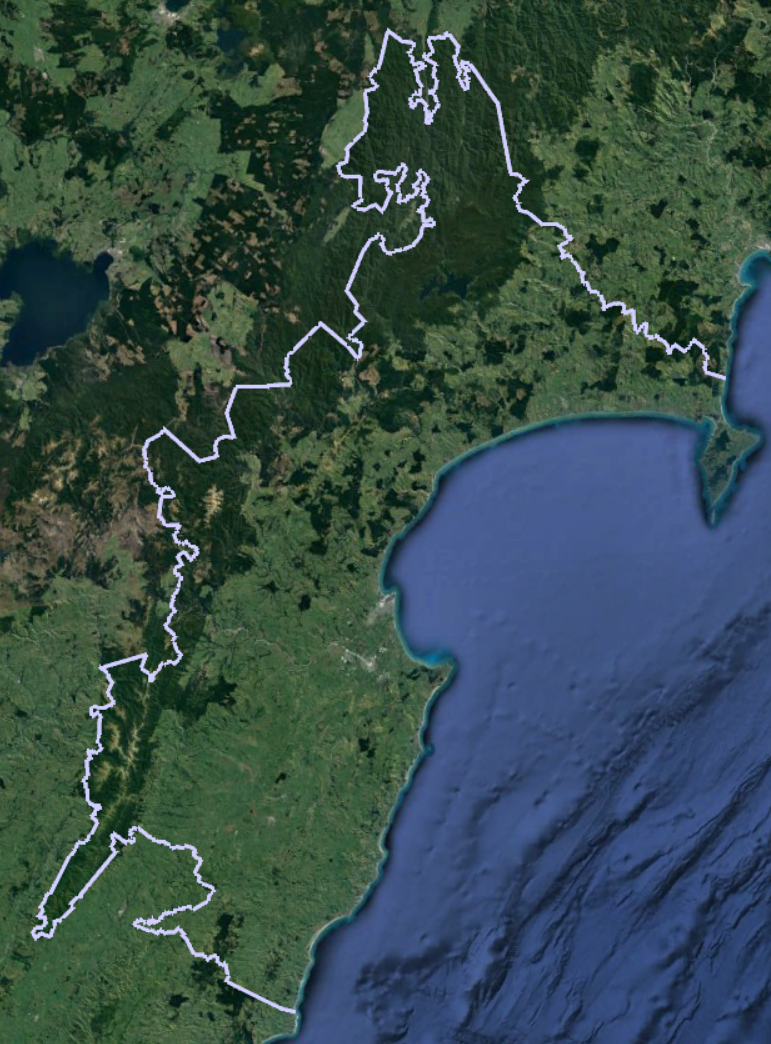
- Hawke's Bay coastline, with Te Angiangi Marine Reserve in the southern part of the coastline

- Location within North Island
- Location: Hawke's Bay Region, New Zealand
- Nearest city: Hastings
- Coordinates: 40.169871°S 176.8318396°E
- Area: 446 hectares (1,100 acres)
- Established: 1997
- Governing body: Department of Conservation

Te Angiangi Marine Reserve is a marine reserve covering a marine area of 446 hectares (1,100 acres) in the Hawke's Bay Region of New Zealand's North Island. It was established in 1997 and is administered by the Department of Conservation.

The reserve protects a piece of the Central Hawke's Bay District coastline, between Aramoana and Blackhead Beach, east of the main settlements on State Highway 2. Aramoana is a 30 minute drive from Waipawa, while Blackhead Beach is a 30 minute drive from Waipukurau.

It is the only marine reserve in the Hawke's Bay Region, but is located well south of the Hawke's Bay itself.

== Geography ==
The reserve extends from a large triangular beacon at the mouth of the Ouepoto Stream in the north, to another beacon 100 metres south of the end of Long Range Road at Blackhead in the south. It also extends 1.853 kilometres (1.151 mi) offshore from the mean high water line, with the depth ranging from 24 metres (79 ft) and 36 metres (118 ft).

The large tidal platform provides a habitat for octopus, crayfish, wandering sea anemones, and other species. The warm East Cape current and the colder South Wairarapa current mix offshore, bringing together species from north and south of the reserve that are not usually seen together. Rock lobsters are also regularly seen.

When the platform is exposed at low tide, there are beds of Neptune's necklace, coralline algae, patches of sea grass, and rockpools with fish and shellfish, including golden limpets. Many migratory wading birds take advantage of the low tide to feed, including kingfishers, gulls, herons, various oystercatchers, pied stilts and flocks of eastern bar-tailed godwits.

Small flocks of gulls, white-fronted terns and Caspian terns roost on the sand at the mouths of small streams during high tide. Banded dotterels also visit the beaches at high tide.

== History ==
When Ngāti Kahungunu settled the Central Hawke's Bay, Porangahau's descendant Te Aomatarahi was given the lands east of the Tukituki River. It was then divided further between his descendants, Tu Mapuhiarangi and Te Angiangi. The local hapū Ngāti Kere gave the marine reserve the name Te Angiangi as it was the area under his mana.

The reserve was formally established on 4 August 1997, after many years of work by the Department of Conservation and the local community.

In April 2011, heavy rainfall during a shallow magnitude 4.5 earthquake caused the full width of the rock platform to be inundated with 14 landslides, completely burying and sweeping away all lifeforms. Relentless wave action began to uncover the platform within a few months. The reserve started to was still recovering in 2018.

In January 2012, six Hawke's Bay prisoners on temporary release and their two supervisors were caught illegally collecting pāua and kina from the marine reserve.

There is evidence of ongoing widespread poaching. In 2013, 20% of convictions for fishing in New Zealand marine reserves related to Te Angiangi. In December 2017, a sharp increase in poaching was reported with seven convictions in seven weeks. Another conviction was reported in September 2018.

A further rise in poaching was reported between 2020 and 2021 when there was no resident ranger to patrol the marine reserve.

== Recreation ==
The marine reserve is open for watching birds and wildlife, and exploring rock pools. Swimming is at Shelly Bay, and at Stringray Bay at low tide. The reserve is well-suited to snorkelling and scuba diving, including off the rock platform.

Nothing can be taken from the marine reserve, including through fishing, seaweed or shellfish gathering. Rocks in rock pools must be returned to their original position. Activities which disturb marine life, like discharging firearms and trampling on plant life, is not allowed. Horses and vehicles can be taken along the top of the rock platform, but cannot be taken to the rocky areas below the mean high water line. Dogs must be kept on a leash, and no other plants or animals can be taken into the reserve.

Boats are allowed, but people must take care when anchoring to avoid damaging the sea floor. When encountering seals, dolphins or whales, the boat must be slowed to five knots, must stay 50 metres away, must not travel through the middle of a pod, must avoid making sudden course changes, and must not accelerate until they are well clear.

There are campgrounds and a range of bach accommodation at both ends of the reserve.

== See also ==
- Marine reserves of New Zealand
