= Pōrangahau =

Settlement in Hawke's Bay Region, New Zealand

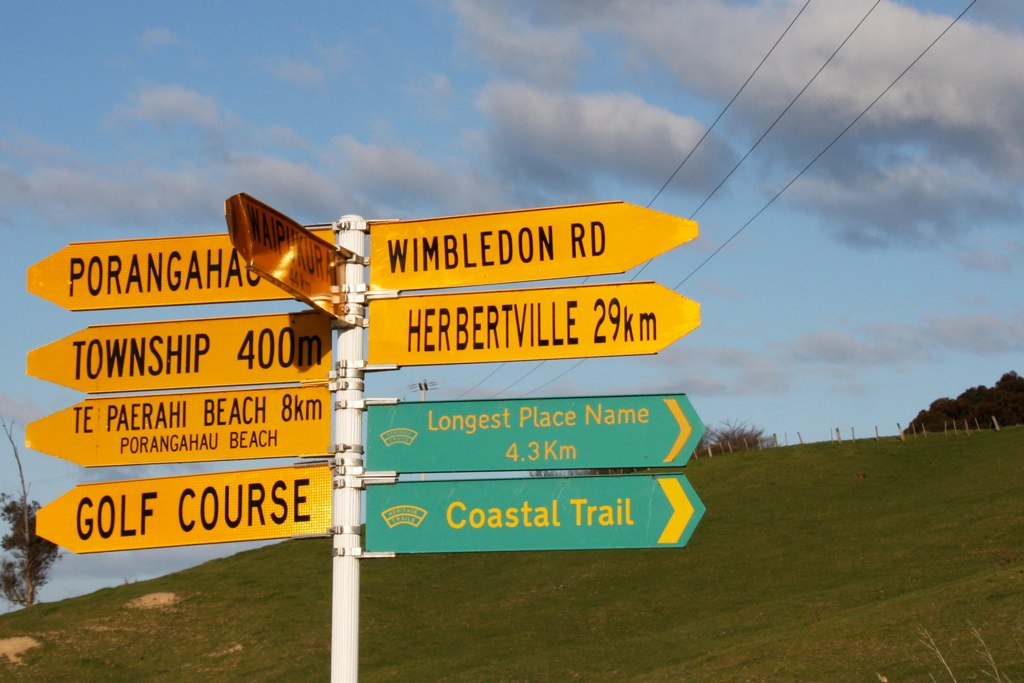
- Interactive map of Pōrangahau
- Coordinates: 40°18′07″S 176°36′45″E
- Country: New Zealand
- Region: Hawke's Bay
- Territorial authority: Central Hawke's Bay District
- Ward: Aramoana-Ruahine
- Electorates: Wairarapa; Ikaroa-Rāwhiti (Māori)

Government
  - Territorial Authority: Central Hawke's Bay District Council
  - Regional council: Hawke's Bay Regional Council
  - Mayor of Central Hawke's Bay: Will Foley
  - Wairarapa MP: TBD
  - Ikaroa-Rāwhiti MP: Cushla Tangaere-Manuel

Area
  - Total: 0.43 km^{2} (0.17 sq mi)

Population (June 2025)
  - Total: 150
  - Density: 350/km^{2} (900/sq mi)

Pōrangahau is a small township close to the Pacific Ocean coast in the south-east of the North Island of New Zealand. It lies in the southernmost part of Hawke's Bay, 45 kilometres south of Waipukurau, and close to the mouth of the Pōrangahau River. The settlement includes a marae and a school.

The Māori name Pōrangahau expresses the idea of a night (pō) of pursuit or of retreat (rangahau).

Six kilometres southwest of the township stands an insubstantial hill, with the longest place name in the world: Taumatawhakatangihangakoauauotamateaturipukakapikimaungahoronukupokaiwhenuakitanatahu.

The area west of the main township, known as Mangaorapa, was used for sheep farming during the 20th century. The area has more recently been used for cattle farming and wine growing. The 2370 hectare Mangaorapa Station was the most expensive farm in Central Hawke's Bay when it was sold in 2005.

== Demographics ==
Statistics New Zealand describes Pōrangahau as a rural settlement, which covers 0.43 km^{2} (0.17 sq mi). It had an estimated population of 150 as of June 2025, with a population density of 349 people per km^{2}. Pōrangahau is part of the larger Taurekaitai statistical area.

Historical population for Pōrangahau
Year	Pop.	±% p.a.
2006	120	—
2013	102	−2.29%
2018	141	+6.69%
2023	156	+2.04%

Pōrangahau had a population of 156 in the 2023 New Zealand census, an increase of 15 people (10.6%) since the 2018 census, and an increase of 54 people (52.9%) since the 2013 census. There were 81 males and 72 females in 51 dwellings. 1.9% of people identified as LGBTIQ+. The median age was 52.0 years (compared with 38.1 years nationally). There were 27 people (17.3%) aged under 15 years, 15 (9.6%) aged 15 to 29, 66 (42.3%) aged 30 to 64, and 42 (26.9%) aged 65 or older.

People could identify as more than one ethnicity. The results were 48.1% European (Pākehā), 67.3% Māori, and 5.8% Pasifika. English was spoken by 98.1%, Māori by 17.3%, and Samoan by 3.8%. No language could be spoken by 1.9% (e.g. too young to talk). The percentage of people born overseas was 7.7, compared with 28.8% nationally.

Religious affiliations were 40.4% Christian, 5.8% Māori religious beliefs, and 1.9% other religions. People who answered that they had no religion were 48.1%, and 3.8% of people did not answer the census question.

Of those at least 15 years old, 12 (9.3%) people had a bachelor's or higher degree, 66 (51.2%) had a post-high school certificate or diploma, and 45 (34.9%) people exclusively held high school qualifications. The median income was $30,300, compared with $41,500 nationally. 3 people (2.3%) earned over $100,000 compared to 12.1% nationally. The employment status of those at least 15 was 45 (34.9%) full-time, 15 (11.6%) part-time, and 3 (2.3%) unemployed.

=== Taurekaitai statistical area ===
Taurekaitai statistical area covers 1,153.22 km^{2} (445.26 sq mi) and had an estimated population of 2,120 as of June 2025, with a population density of 1.8 people per km^{2}.

Historical population for Taurekaitai
Year	Pop.	±% p.a.
2006	1,758	—
2013	1,632	−1.06%
2018	1,860	+2.65%
2023	2,073	+2.19%
The 2006 population is for a larger area of 1,153.82 km^{2}. Source:

Taurekaitai had a population of 2,073 in the 2023 New Zealand census, an increase of 213 people (11.5%) since the 2018 census, and an increase of 441 people (27.0%) since the 2013 census. There were 1,038 males, 1,032 females, and 3 people of other genders in 759 dwellings. 1.2% of people identified as LGBTIQ+. The median age was 45.4 years (compared with 38.1 years nationally). There were 435 people (21.0%) aged under 15 years, 249 (12.0%) aged 15 to 29, 933 (45.0%) aged 30 to 64, and 456 (22.0%) aged 65 or older.

People could identify as more than one ethnicity. The results were 85.8% European (Pākehā); 23.3% Māori; 2.0% Pasifika; 1.3% Asian; 0.3% Middle Eastern, Latin American and African New Zealanders (MELAA); and 3.3% other, which includes people giving their ethnicity as "New Zealander". English was spoken by 98.1%, Māori by 3.9%, Samoan by 0.1%, and other languages by 3.0%. No language could be spoken by 1.9% (e.g. too young to talk). New Zealand Sign Language was known by 0.3%. The percentage of people born overseas was 8.7, compared with 28.8% nationally.

Religious affiliations were 33.1% Christian, 0.1% Islam, 1.0% Māori religious beliefs, 0.6% New Age, and 1.2% other religions. People who answered that they had no religion were 57.9%, and 6.2% of people did not answer the census question.

Of those at least 15 years old, 321 (19.6%) people had a bachelor's or higher degree, 975 (59.5%) had a post-high school certificate or diploma, and 342 (20.9%) people exclusively held high school qualifications. The median income was $38,800, compared with $41,500 nationally. 150 people (9.2%) earned over $100,000 compared to 12.1% nationally. The employment status of those at least 15 was 831 (50.7%) full-time, 291 (17.8%) part-time, and 36 (2.2%) unemployed.

== Marae ==
The local Rongomaraeroa Marae and its meeting house, Te Poho o Kahungunu, are affiliated with the Ngāti Kahungunu hapū of Ngāti Hinetewai, Ngāti Kere, Ngāti Manuhiri, Ngāti Pihere and Tamatea Hinepare o Kahungunu.

== Education ==
Porangahau School is a Year 1–8 co-educational state primary school. It is a decile 4 school with a roll of 33 as of July 2026. The school first opened in 1867.

Mangaorapa School merged with Porangahau School at the end of 2014. Mangaorapa School opened in 1925.

== Notable people ==
- Max Christie, politician and local farmer
- George Hunter, politician and local landowner
- Kuni Kaa Jenkins, educationalist
- Piri Sciascia, Māori leader and kapa haka exponent
