= Ōtāne =

Town in Hawke's Bay, New Zealand

- Interactive map of Ōtāne
- Coordinates: 39°53′S 176°38′E
- Country: New Zealand
- Region: Hawke's Bay
- Territorial authority: Central Hawke's Bay District
- Ward: Aramoana-Ruahine
- Electorates: Tukituki; Ikaroa-Rāwhiti (Māori)

Government
  - Territorial Authority: Central Hawke's Bay District Council
  - Regional council: Hawke's Bay Regional Council
  - Mayor of Central Hawke's Bay: Will Foley
  - Tukituki MP: Catherine Wedd
  - Ikaroa-Rāwhiti MP: Cushla Tangaere-Manuel

Area
  - Total: 0.94 km^{2} (0.36 sq mi)
- Elevation: 95 m (312 ft)

Population (June 2025)
  - Total: 780
  - Density: 830/km^{2} (2,100/sq mi)

Ōtāne is a town in the Central Hawke's Bay District and the Hawke's Bay region, on the east coast of New Zealand's North Island. The small village has a school, general store, cafe and pub, and is located just off State Highway 2.

== History ==
The town was founded in 1874, during a subdivision of Henry Tiffen's 5140-hectare Homewood farming estate. The first sales of Kaikora township sections were on 26 March 1874. It became the centre of the Patangata County from 1885 to 1977. The county took its name from a nearby Māori pā.

=== Name ===
On 1 April 1910 the Post Department changed the name from Kaikora North to Otane, to avoid confusion with Kaikōura. The name of the railway station was changed a month later. An 1869 advert mentioned Otane bush, Kaikora.

In July 2020, the name of the locality was officially gazetted as Ōtāne by the New Zealand Geographic Board, having previously often been written as Otane. The New Zealand Ministry for Culture and Heritage gives a translation of "place of a man" for Ōtāne.

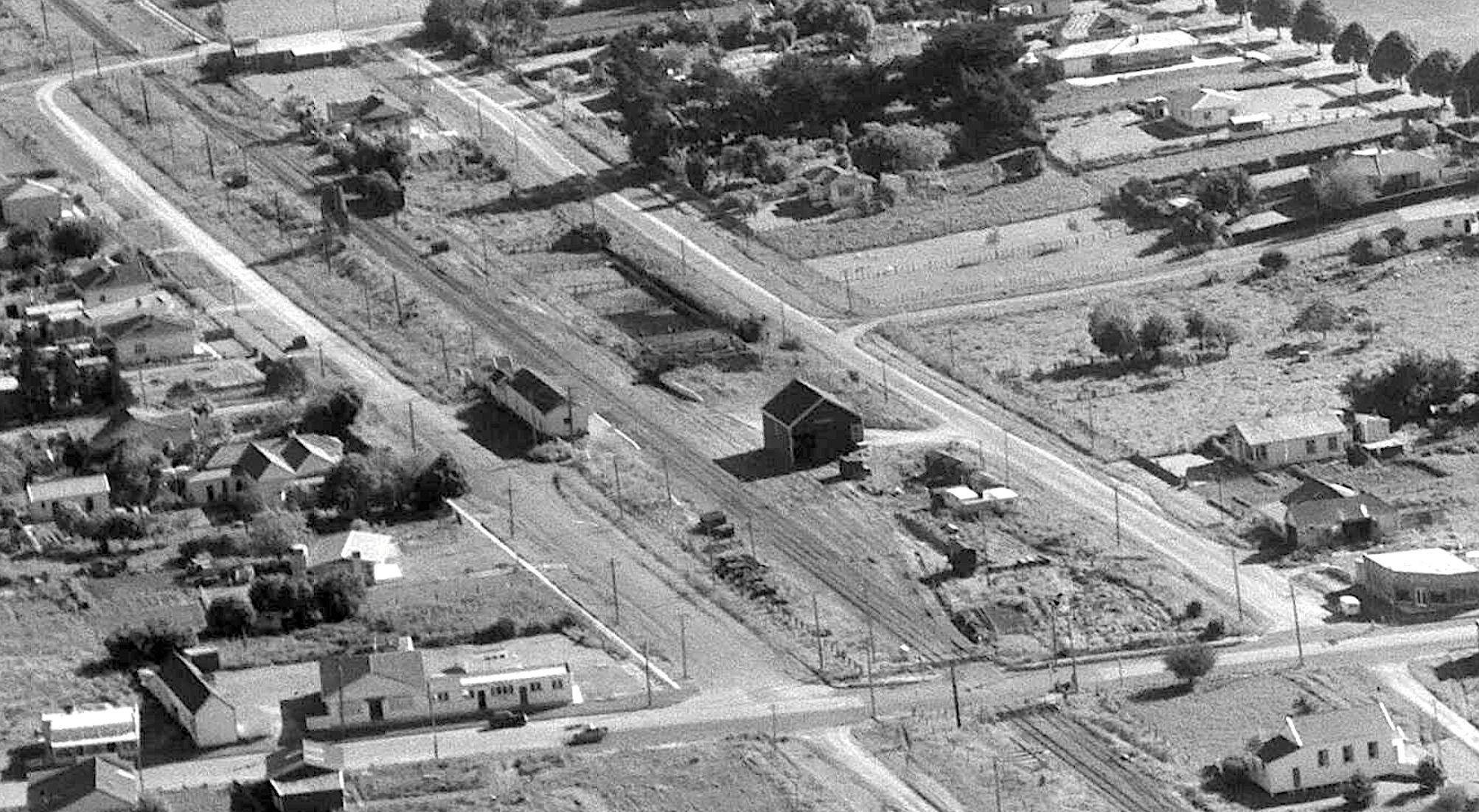
Ōtāne railway station in 1958

=== Library ===
Tenders for a new public library were invited in 1883 and it was open by 1884. It was replaced in 1929 by a building which also contained council and medical offices. It is now occupied by Henry's Family Pies, cafe and store. A war memorial is next to the former library.

=== Railway station ===
Initially the township was served by mail coaches running between Napier and Waipukurau. Ōtāne (at that time Kaikora) railway station opened on Monday 28 August 1876, when the railway was extended from Te Aute to Waipawa. as part of the Palmerston North–Gisborne Line. It was part of the Paki Paki to Waipukurau contract, tendered on 9 July 1874 for £19,532 by Charles McKirdy, of Wellington, who built the Rimutaka Incline and several other lines. A local contractor tendered £29,173. There were allegations of mismanagement and disputes about the contracts. However, in 1876, the Minister for Public Works, Edward Richardson, attributed delays only to unexpectedly heavy land claims and floods. S Tracey and Allen, of Napier, tendered £7,989 for track for the Paki Paki-Waipawa length in September 1875. Ōtāne started with 2 trains a day in each direction, increased to 3 in 1883 and 4 in 1896.

By March 1876 Justin McSweeney had built a platform and station, McLeod & Co a 5th class stationmaster's house and Joseph Sowry a goods shed and water tank. In 1884 the station was enlarged and a loading ramp, cattle and sheep yards added. That station burnt down on 1 February 1894. By 1896 Kaikora had a 5th class station, platform (154 ft (47 m) long in 1926), cart approach, 40 ft (12 m) x 30 ft (9.1 m) goods shed, loading bank, cattle yards, stationmaster's house, urinals and a passing loop for 26 wagons. In 1940 the loop was extended for 80 wagons. There was a Post Office at the station from 1883 to 1912. In 1912 an automatic tablet exchanger was added. Railway houses were built in 1927, 1945 and 1953. In 1966 a new 500 ft^{2} (46 m^{2}) station was built of concrete blocks, with an aluminium roof on the same site. On 9 October 1967 Ōtāne closed as an officered station and on 8 June 1985 it closed to all traffic. Only a short platform remains.

	Former adjoining stations	
Waipawa; Line open, station closed 5.81 km (3.61 mi)	Palmerston North–Gisborne Line	Pukehou; Line open, station closed 7.1 km (4.4 mi)

== Demographics ==
Statistics New Zealand describes Ōtāne as a rural settlement, which covers 0.94 km^{2} (0.36 sq mi). and had an estimated population of 780 as of June 2025, with a population density of 830 people per km^{2}. Ōtāne is part of the larger Mangarara statistical area.

Historical population
Year	Pop.	±% p.a.
2006	516	—
2013	543	+0.73%
2018	663	+4.07%
2023	762	+2.82%

Ōtāne had a population of 762 in the 2023 New Zealand census, an increase of 99 people (14.9%) since the 2018 census, and an increase of 219 people (40.3%) since the 2013 census. There were 348 males and 408 females in 282 dwellings. 2.8% of people identified as LGBTIQ+. The median age was 38.9 years (compared with 38.1 years nationally). There were 165 people (21.7%) aged under 15 years, 96 (12.6%) aged 15 to 29, 357 (46.9%) aged 30 to 64, and 141 (18.5%) aged 65 or older.

People could identify as more than one ethnicity. The results were 76.4% European (Pākehā), 33.5% Māori, 3.5% Pasifika, 3.9% Asian, and 3.1% other, which includes people giving their ethnicity as "New Zealander". English was spoken by 96.5%, Māori by 9.8%, Samoan by 1.2%, and other languages by 5.5%. No language could be spoken by 3.1% (e.g. too young to talk). New Zealand Sign Language was known by 0.4%. The percentage of people born overseas was 14.6, compared with 28.8% nationally.

Religious affiliations were 29.1% Christian, 0.4% Hindu, 0.4% Islam, 2.8% Māori religious beliefs, 0.8% New Age, and 0.4% other religions. People who answered that they had no religion were 56.7%, and 9.1% of people did not answer the census question.

Of those at least 15 years old, 84 (14.1%) people had a bachelor's or higher degree, 354 (59.3%) had a post-high school certificate or diploma, and 159 (26.6%) people exclusively held high school qualifications. The median income was $38,400, compared with $41,500 nationally. 42 people (7.0%) earned over $100,000 compared to 12.1% nationally. The employment status of those at least 15 was 303 (50.8%) full-time, 75 (12.6%) part-time, and 18 (3.0%) unemployed.

== Education ==
Ōtāne School is a Year 1–8 co-educational state primary school. It is a decile 3 school with a roll of 77 as of July 2026. The first Otane School was built in 1868, but burned in 1899 and was rebuilt on the present site.

Argyll East School is a Year 1–8 co-educational state primary school. It is a decile 4 school with a roll of 76 as of July 2026. The school opened in 1903.
