= Aramoana, Hawke's Bay =

Locality in Hawke's Bay Region, New Zealand

Aramoana
- Interactive map of Aramoana
- Coordinates: 40°08′49″S 176°50′13″E
- Country: New Zealand
- Region: Hawke's Bay
- Territorial authority: Central Hawke's Bay District
- Ward: Aramoana-Ruahine
- Electorates: Wairarapa; Ikaroa-Rāwhiti (Māori)

Government
  - Territorial Authority: Central Hawke's Bay District Council
  - Regional council: Hawke's Bay Regional Council
  - Mayor of Central Hawke's Bay: Will Foley
  - Wairarapa MP: Mike Butterick
  - Ikaroa-Rāwhiti MP: Cushla Tangaere-Manuel

Aramoana is a small coastal settlement in Hawke's Bay, New Zealand. It is located on the east coast of the North Island of New Zealand.

== Geography ==
The town is the location of Aramoana Beach, also known as Shoal Beach. Te Angiangi Marine Reserve covers an area of 446 hectares and extends one nautical mile offshore between Shoal Beach and Blackhead.
