= Blackhead, Hawke's Bay =

Locality in Hawke's Bay Region, New Zealand

Blackhead
- Interactive map of Blackhead
- Coordinates: 40°10′08″S 176°49′30″E
- Country: New Zealand
- Region: Hawke's Bay
- Territorial authority: Central Hawke's Bay District
- Ward: Aramoana-Ruahine
- Electorates: Wairarapa; Ikaroa-Rāwhiti (Māori)

Government
  - Territorial Authority: Central Hawke's Bay District Council
  - Regional council: Hawke's Bay Regional Council
  - Mayor of Central Hawke's Bay: Will Foley
  - Wairarapa MP: TBD
  - Ikaroa-Rāwhiti MP: Cushla Tangaere-Manuel

Blackhead is a small coastal settlement in Hawke's Bay, New Zealand. It is located on the east coast of the North Island of New Zealand, about 74 kilometres south of Napier. Blackhead Beach is a sandy beach, similar to other Hawke's Bay beaches such as Shoal Beach. The original Māori name for the beach is Te Pariomahu and this is more commonly used by local hapū.

There is a marine reserve located offshore from Blackhead Beach.

Te Angiangi Marine Reserve covers an area offshore from Blackhead.

== Marae ==
The Pourerere Marae, located near Blackhead, is a tribal meeting ground for the Ngāti Kahungunu hapū of Ngāi Te Ōatua and Ngāti Tamaterā.
