= Takapau =

Settlement in Hawke's Bay Region, New Zealand

- Rural community
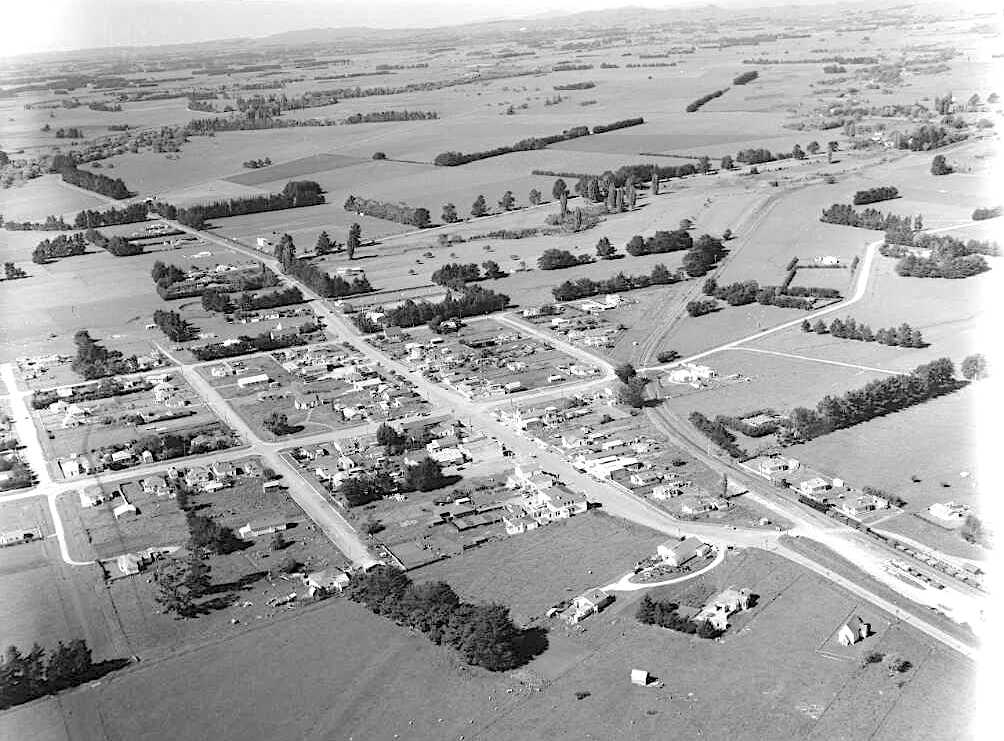
- Takapau in 1958
- Interactive map of Takapau
- Coordinates: 40°02′S 176°21′E
- Country: New Zealand
- Region: Hawke's Bay
- Territorial authority: Central Hawke's Bay District
- Ward: Aramoana-Ruahine
- Electorates: Wairarapa; Ikaroa-Rāwhiti (Māori)

Government
  - Territorial Authority: Central Hawke's Bay District Council
  - Regional council: Hawke's Bay Regional Council
  - Mayor of Central Hawke's Bay: Will Foley
  - Wairarapa MP: Mike Butterick
  - Ikaroa-Rāwhiti MP: Cushla Tangaere-Manuel

Area
  - Total: 3.18 km^{2} (1.23 sq mi)
- Elevation: 235 m (771 ft)

Population (June 2025)
  - Total: 690
  - Density: 220/km^{2} (560/sq mi)

Takapau is a rural town in the Central Hawkes Bay in New Zealand. It is located 20 kilometres west of Waipukurau, off State Highway 2, and has a population of more than 500.

Takapau was founded following a survey of the Oruawharo station. The Johnston family, who owned the Oruawharo station, helped establish many civic and religious institutions within the town.

== Etymology ==
The name of the town is taken from the Te Takapau pa.

== History ==
Takapau was surveyed out of the Oruawharo station on 19 September 1876, under the auspice of Sydney Johnston, who was managing the station that belonged to his father. Sydney also made donations to establish St Vincent's Church (Catholic) and St Mark's Church (Anglican), the town hall, and library. In addition Sydney set aside land for the school and gifted land for a Plunket building. Many of the streets in Takapau are named after members of the Johnston family and the Takapau cemetery has a memorial gate dedicated to Sydney.

Takapau was once the centre of a large flax milling industry, and the community takes its name from the flax that grew in the expansive Takapau plains. The Māori word translates literally as "mat" or "carpet".

The largest business in Takapau is now the Silverfern Farms meat-processing plant, founded by the Hawke's Bay Farmers’ Meat Company in 1981. Kintail Honey, one of country's largest honey-packing and beekeeping operations, is also based in the town.

== Demographics ==
Statistics New Zealand describes Takapau as a rural settlement, which covers 3.18 km^{2} (1.23 sq mi). It had an estimated population of 690 as of June 2025, with a population density of 217 people per km^{2}. It is part of the larger Makaretu statistical area.

Historical population
| Year | Pop. | ±% p.a. |
|---|---|---|
| 2006 | 516 | — |
| 2013 | 525 | +0.25% |
| 2018 | 594 | +2.50% |
| 2023 | 672 | +2.50% |

Takapau had a population of 672 in the 2023 New Zealand census, an increase of 78 people (13.1%) since the 2018 census, and an increase of 147 people (28.0%) since the 2013 census. There were 327 males, 342 females, and 3 people of other genders in 237 dwellings. 1.3% of people identified as LGBTIQ+. The median age was 40.2 years (compared with 38.1 years nationally). There were 150 people (22.3%) aged under 15 years, 111 (16.5%) aged 15 to 29, 285 (42.4%) aged 30 to 64, and 123 (18.3%) aged 65 or older.

People could identify as more than one ethnicity. The results were 74.6% European (Pākehā); 41.5% Māori; 4.5% Pasifika; 2.7% Asian; 0.4% Middle Eastern, Latin American and African New Zealanders (MELAA); and 3.6% other, which includes people giving their ethnicity as "New Zealander". English was spoken by 97.8%, Māori by 10.7%, Samoan by 0.4%, and other languages by 4.9%. No language could be spoken by 1.8% (e.g. too young to talk). New Zealand Sign Language was known by 0.9%. The percentage of people born overseas was 8.9, compared with 28.8% nationally.

Religious affiliations were 28.1% Christian, 0.4% Islam, 2.7% Māori religious beliefs, 0.4% Buddhist, 1.3% New Age, and 0.9% other religions. People who answered that they had no religion were 62.5%, and 4.9% of people did not answer the census question.

Of those at least 15 years old, 45 (8.6%) people had a bachelor's or higher degree, 303 (58.0%) had a post-high school certificate or diploma, and 174 (33.3%) people exclusively held high school qualifications. The median income was $34,300, compared with $41,500 nationally. 15 people (2.9%) earned over $100,000 compared to 12.1% nationally. The employment status of those at least 15 was 252 (48.3%) full-time, 54 (10.3%) part-time, and 12 (2.3%) unemployed.

== Marae ==
The local Rongo o Tahu Marae is a tribal meeting ground for the Ngāti Kahungunu hapū of Ngāi Toroiwaho.

== Education ==
Takapau School is a Year 1–8 co-educational state primary school, with a roll of 113 as of July 2026. The school opened in 1879.

Te Kura Kaupapa Māori o Takapau is a Year 1–8 is a co-educational state Kura Kaupapa Māori school, with a roll of 39 as of July 2026. The school opened in 1994.

== Railway station ==
Takapau
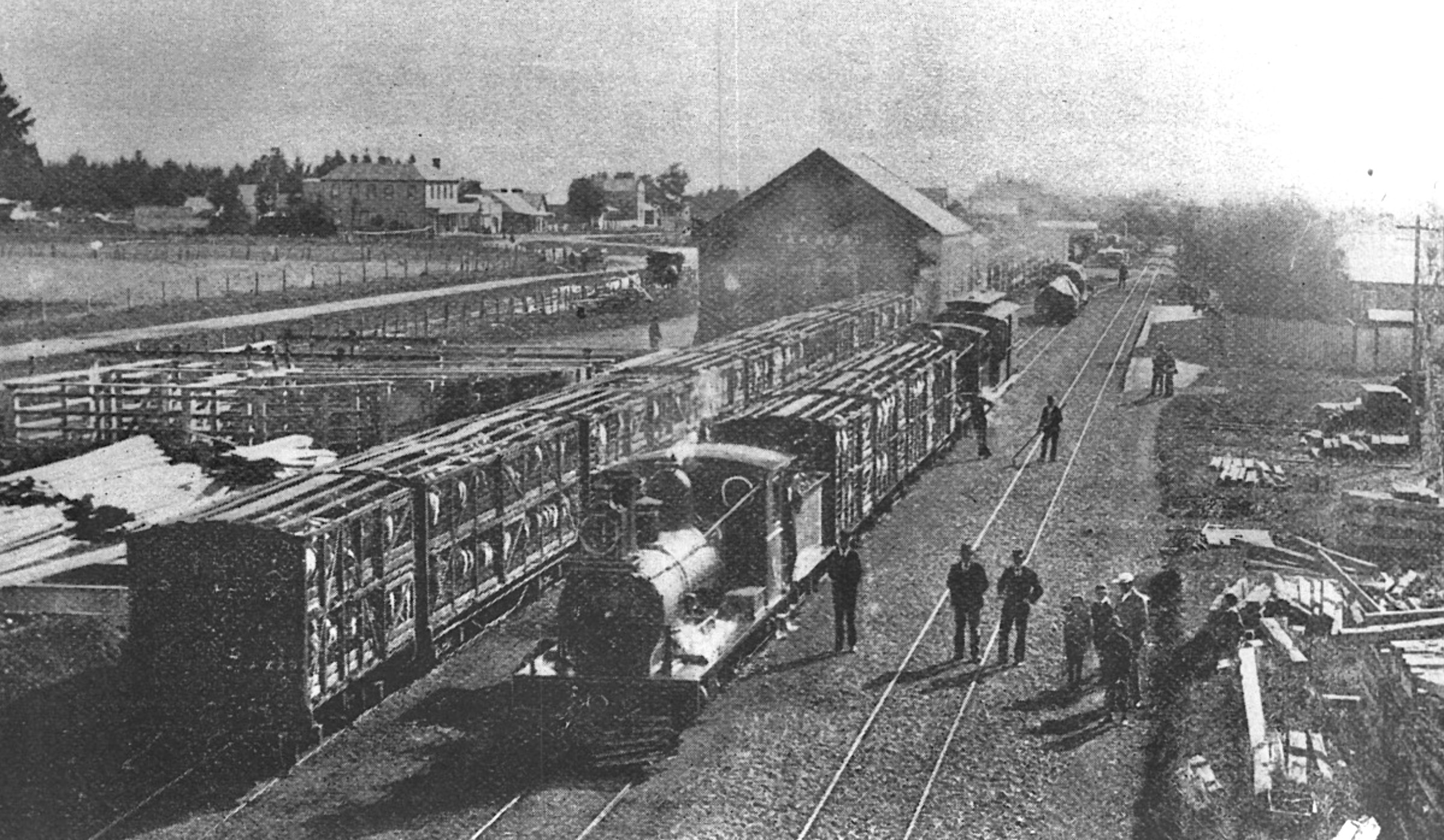
- J Class loco at Takapau June 1901

General information
- Elevation: 235 m (771 ft)
- System: New Zealand Government Railways (NZGR) regional rail
- Line: Palmerston North - Gisborne Line
- Platforms: Single

History
- Opened: 12 March 1877
- Closed: 27 September 1981

Services
| Preceding station | Historical railways | Following station |
|---|---|---|
| Kopua; Line open, station closed 9.36 km (5.82 mi) towards PN | Takapau | Takapau crossing loop Line open, station closed 3.78 km (2.35 mi) towards Napier |
| Takapau; Line open, station closed 3.78 km (2.35 mi) towards PN | Takapau crossing loop | Marakeke; Line open, station closed 4.62 km (2.87 mi) towards Napier |
Location

Takapau had a railway station from 12 March 1877 to 27 September 1981. It was the terminus of the line from Spit for 10 months, until 25 January 1878, when the extension to Kopua opened. Takapau at that time was on the northern edge of the Seventy Mile Bush.

Edmund Allan and Samuel Kingstreet had a £14,100 contract to build the 14 mi (23 km) extension of the Napier to Waipukurau railway south to Takapau. They built a 5th class station in 1875 and Donald McLeod, a Waipukurau carpenter, built a goods shed and platform in 1877. Initially, only one train a day ran from Takapau. In 1890 there were two trains a day. There was a post office at the station from 1887 to 1911. By 1896 there were 30 ft (9.1 m) x 20 ft (6.1 m) and 40 ft (12 m) x 30 ft (9.1 m) goods sheds and also a cart approach, loading bank, cattle yards, stationmaster's house, urinals and a passing loop for 24 wagons, extended to 55 in 1911 and further extended in 1940. In 1905 a verandah was added and the platform extended. Electric lights were installed in 1921. Railway houses were built in 1928 and 1946.

A platform and shelter remained, which appeared weed-grown in a 2015 photo, but have now been replaced by an information board. There has been no regular passenger train since at least 1995. There is now only a single line passing through the original Takapau station site.

There was also a passing loop at Whenuahou, 4 mi 42 ch (7.3 km) south of Takapau, which was originally used for construction of the viaduct to the south.

=== Takapau crossing loop ===
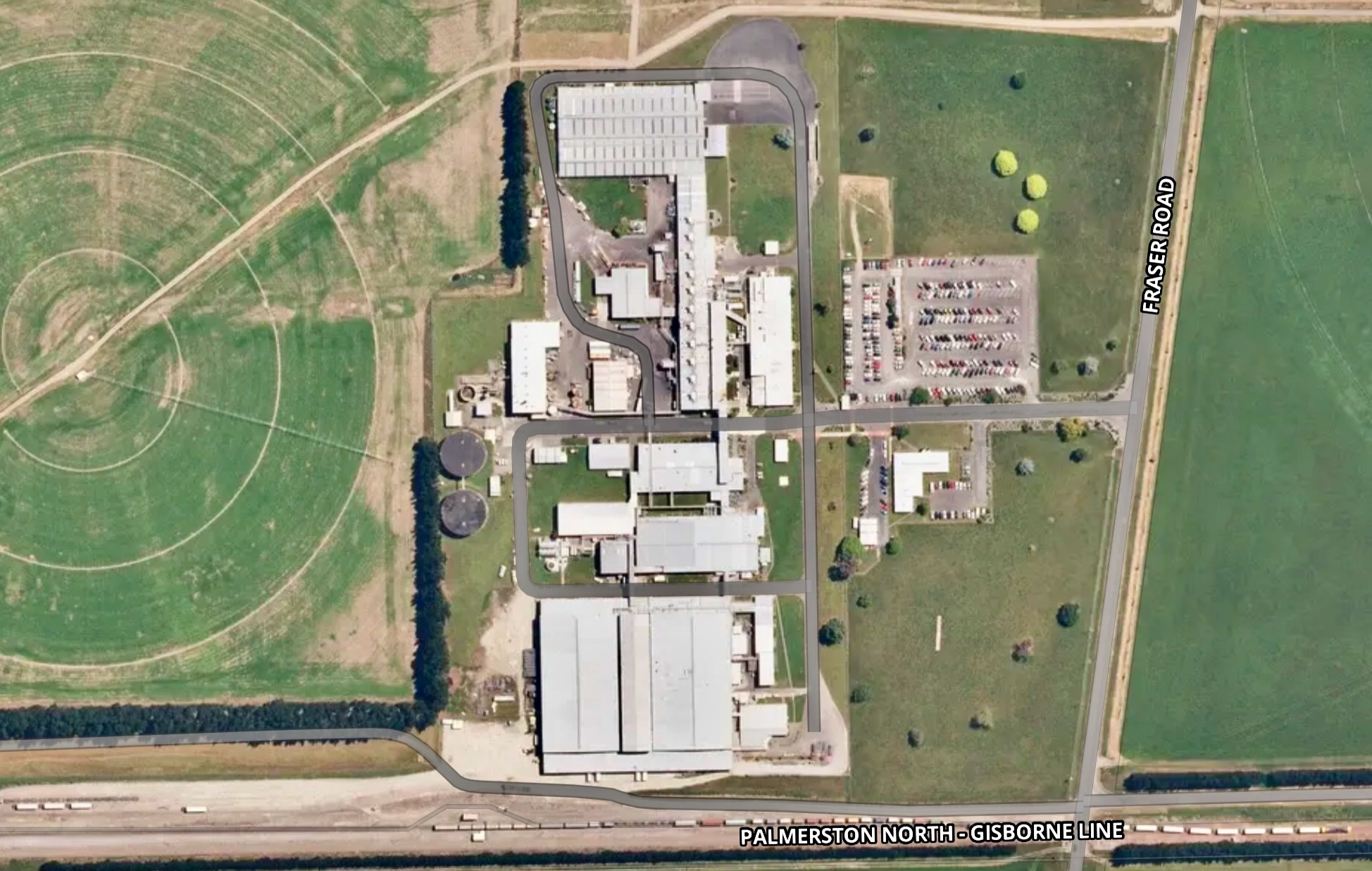
Takapau crossing loop and Silver Fern Farms works, about 2024

Towards Napier, Oruawharo had a railway station from about 1882 to 1896. In 1874 Edmund Allan and Samuel Kingstreet won a £14,100 contract for the 14 mi (23 km) extension of the Napier to Waipukurau railway south to Takapau. It opened on 12 March 1877. Oruawharo seems to have first appeared in a timetable as a flag station from 27 March 1882. It was about 1/4 mi (400 m) from the house and 53 mi 75 ch (86.8 km) from Napier, or 2 mi 46 ch (4.1 km) north of Takapau. An application by the owner of Oruawharo Homestead, Sydney Johnston, for a private siding was mentioned on 19 March 1888. In 1896 and 1897 it was recorded as having a shelter shed and platform. It seems to have last appeared in a railway timetable in 1896, though, even before that, in 1894, an train carrying guests to the Homestead for a ball travelled to Takapau, rather than Oruawharo. Similarly, a 1911 account said Takapau was the station for the Homestead. However, as late as 1914 it was mentioned that having a camp beside the railway was an advantage.

A new passing loop at Oruawharo, about 320 m (0.20 mi) closer to Takapau than the 1882 station, replaced that at Takapau from 27 September 1981. Richmond Limited opened a slaughterhouse there in 1981, which was bought by Primary Producers Co-operative in 2005, who changed their name to Silver Fern Farms in 2008. It employs over 800 on a 485 ha (1,200 acres) site. The loop and the Silver Fern private siding are still in use.

== Climate ==
Climate data for Takapau (1991–2020)
| Month | Jan | Feb | Mar | Apr | May | Jun | Jul | Aug | Sep | Oct | Nov | Dec | Year |
|---|---|---|---|---|---|---|---|---|---|---|---|---|---|
| Mean daily maximum °C (°F) | 22.3 (72.1) | 22.3 (72.1) | 20.2 (68.4) | 17.0 (62.6) | 14.2 (57.6) | 11.4 (52.5) | 10.7 (51.3) | 11.8 (53.2) | 13.8 (56.8) | 15.8 (60.4) | 17.9 (64.2) | 20.2 (68.4) | 16.5 (61.6) |
| Daily mean °C (°F) | 16.7 (62.1) | 16.8 (62.2) | 14.8 (58.6) | 12.1 (53.8) | 9.9 (49.8) | 7.6 (45.7) | 6.8 (44.2) | 7.6 (45.7) | 9.3 (48.7) | 11.2 (52.2) | 12.9 (55.2) | 15.1 (59.2) | 11.7 (53.1) |
| Mean daily minimum °C (°F) | 11.1 (52.0) | 11.2 (52.2) | 9.5 (49.1) | 7.2 (45.0) | 5.5 (41.9) | 3.7 (38.7) | 3.0 (37.4) | 3.4 (38.1) | 4.9 (40.8) | 6.6 (43.9) | 7.8 (46.0) | 10.0 (50.0) | 7.0 (44.6) |
| Average rainfall mm (inches) | 83.0 (3.27) | 68.1 (2.68) | 71.6 (2.82) | 91.9 (3.62) | 74.9 (2.95) | 100.1 (3.94) | 120.8 (4.76) | 86.5 (3.41) | 86.7 (3.41) | 92.7 (3.65) | 74.0 (2.91) | 74.5 (2.93) | 1,024.8 (40.35) |
Source: NIWA
