= Aramoana (disambiguation) =

Aramoana may refer to:

- Aramoana, Hawke's Bay, southeastern Hawke's Bay, New Zealand
- Aramoana, Otago, near Dunedin, New Zealand
- Victor Aramoana, New Zealand rugby league player
- GMV Aramoana, train ferry operating across Cook Strait between 1962 and 1983.
