= Henry Russell (politician) =

New Zealand politician (1817-1891)

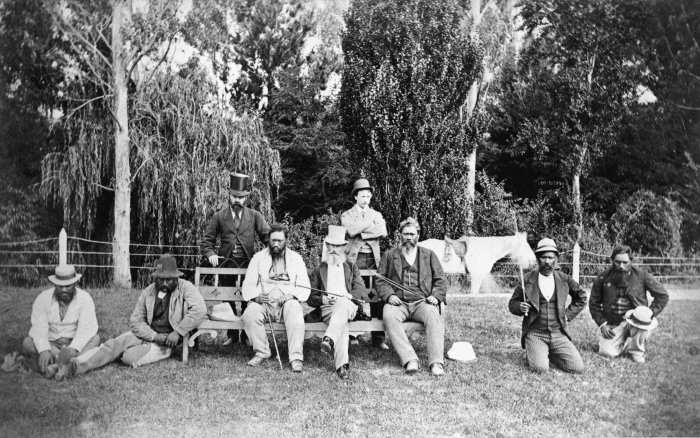
Repudiation party 1876, with Henry Russell sat in the centre

Henry Robert Russell (13 January 1817 – 30 April 1891) was a New Zealand runholder and politician. He was baptised in Dunfermline, Fife, Scotland on 11 February 1817. He was appointed to the New Zealand Legislative Council on 12 July 1862. His membership lapsed on 11 June 1885 after he had been absent for two sessions (he had travelled to England in 1883). He was considered to be the founder of Waipukurau, where he owned the Mount Herbert estate, to the east of the town. His brother, Thomas Purvis Russell, owned the neighbouring Woburn estate and they also owned runs near the Tūranganui River in southern Wairarapa. He left an estate of £100,765.

He died at Richmond in 1891 and his wife, Susanna Cobham Herbert, died at Waipukurau in 1910, aged 90. Their daughter, Eliza Herbert Russell (24 November 1854 – 13 January 1906), married Henry Gainsford, a large land owner at Orini, near Dannevirke, in 1878.
