= Waipukurau =

Town in Hawke's Bay, New Zealand

- Minor urban area
- Interactive map of Waipukurau
- Coordinates: 39°59.5′S 176°33.5′E
- Country: New Zealand
- Region: Hawke's Bay
- Territorial authority: Central Hawke's Bay District
- Ward: Ruataniwha
- Electorates: Wairarapa; Ikaroa-Rāwhiti (Māori)

Government
  - Territorial Authority: Central Hawke's Bay District Council
  - Regional council: Hawke's Bay Regional Council
  - Mayor of Central Hawke's Bay: Will Foley
  - Wairarapa MP: Mike Butterick
  - Ikaroa-Rāwhiti MP: Cushla Tangaere-Manuel

Area
  - Total: 8.70 km^{2} (3.36 sq mi)

Population (June 2025)
  - Total: 4,750
  - Density: 546/km^{2} (1,410/sq mi)
- Postcode(s): 4200

Waipukurau is the largest town in the Central Hawke's Bay District on the east coast of the North Island of New Zealand. It is located on the banks of the Tukituki River, 7 kilometres south of Waipawa and 50 kilometres southwest of Hastings.

== History and culture ==
=== Māori ===
Central Hawkes Bay, where the town is located was settled by Te Aitanga a Whatonga, the descendants of Whatonga, grandson of Toi Kairakau. These were the Ngati Tara and Rangitāne peoples. In the mid 1500s the Ngāti Kahungunu invaded the area from the north and in the subsequent fighting drove the Rangitāne south into the Tahoraiti area (Dannevirke). Warfare continued through the 1600s until the time of Te Rangikoianake. His first child Te Kikiri was adopted by the Ngai Toroiwaho to be their chief - he had mana over the Waipukurau district.

Fighting broke out again in the 1800s at Mangatoetoe between Ngai Te Upokoiri and Ngāti Te Rangikoianake of Poukawa. Several of Te Rangikoianake's grand children were killed in this fight. Pareihe, a Ngati Rangikoianake Chief, avenged the defeat in a battle at Pukekaihau, Waipukurau after which a peace accord was made between the two tribes.

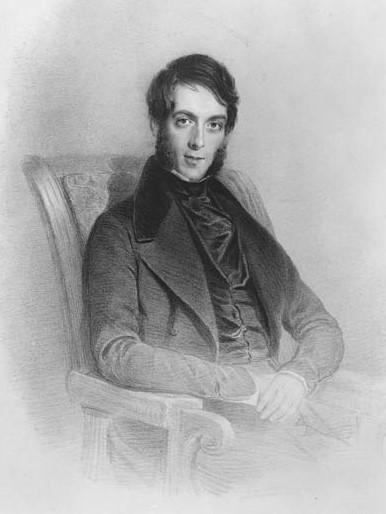
Chief Justice William Martin

The accord was short lived with the death of Te Wanikau's brother-in-law (Chief of Ngai Te Upokoiri) prompting further conflict over the erection of rahui poles on Lake Poukawa, Ngati Rangikoianake's eel fishing area. The conflict, starting around 1819 and lasting till 1824 ended with the Ngati Rangikoianake and other local tribes evacuating the area and settling at Mahia. In the latter part of the 1820s Pareihe attacked the Ngai Te Upokoiri and regained the lands they had lost, with the Ngai Te Upokoiri taking refuge in the Manawatū. A peace accord was made between Pareihe and the Ngāti Tūwharetoa in the late 1830s. The Ngati Tuwharetoa had been allied with the Ngai Te Upokoiri.

Within the current township is Pukekaihau hill, now in Paul Hunter Memorial Park, the site of the Māori Pā, from which it gets its name. Waipukurau is said to mean the water of pukerau, wai being water and pukerau being either a type of giant puffball fungus, Calvatia gigantea, or the immature fruiting bodies of Ileodictyon cibarium (white basket fungus). The pa was near the old Māori trail from the Manawatū Gorge and Hawkes Bay. The first Europeans who are known to have passed through the area were Bishop George Selwyn and Chief Justice Sir William Martin in November 1842 en route to Napier.

=== European ===
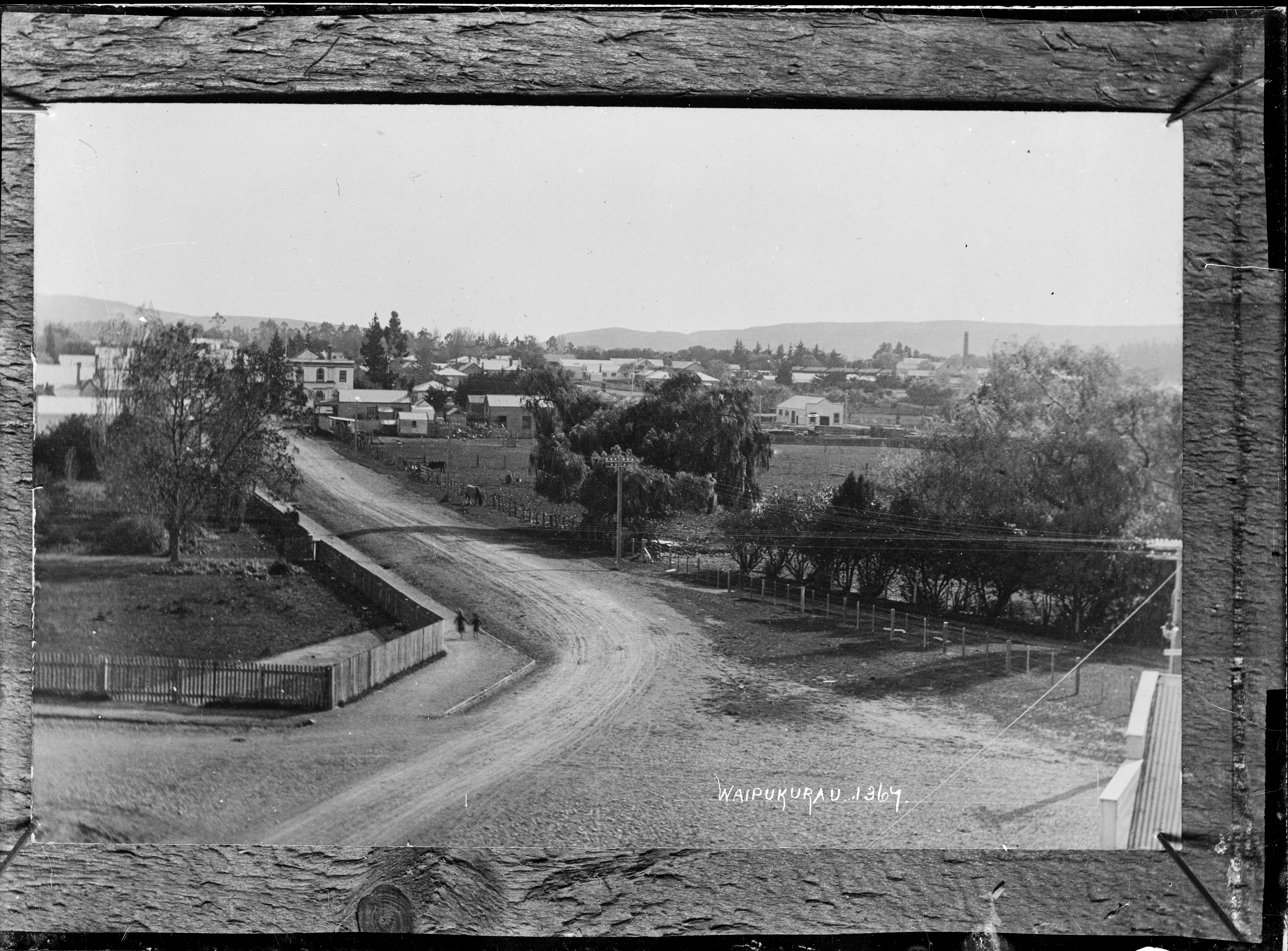
Township about 1910

In December 1850 Donald McLean and his party of Land Commissioners met with the Central Hawkes Bay tribes to discuss purchasing a large block of land for European settlement. Negotiations proceeded through till 4 November 1851 when an area of land called the Waipukurau Block, some 279,000 acres, including the land the town is situated on was acquired from local Māori, led by Te Hapuku for £4,800. Henry Russell acquired the land surrounding Waipukurau, calling it Mount Herbert station.

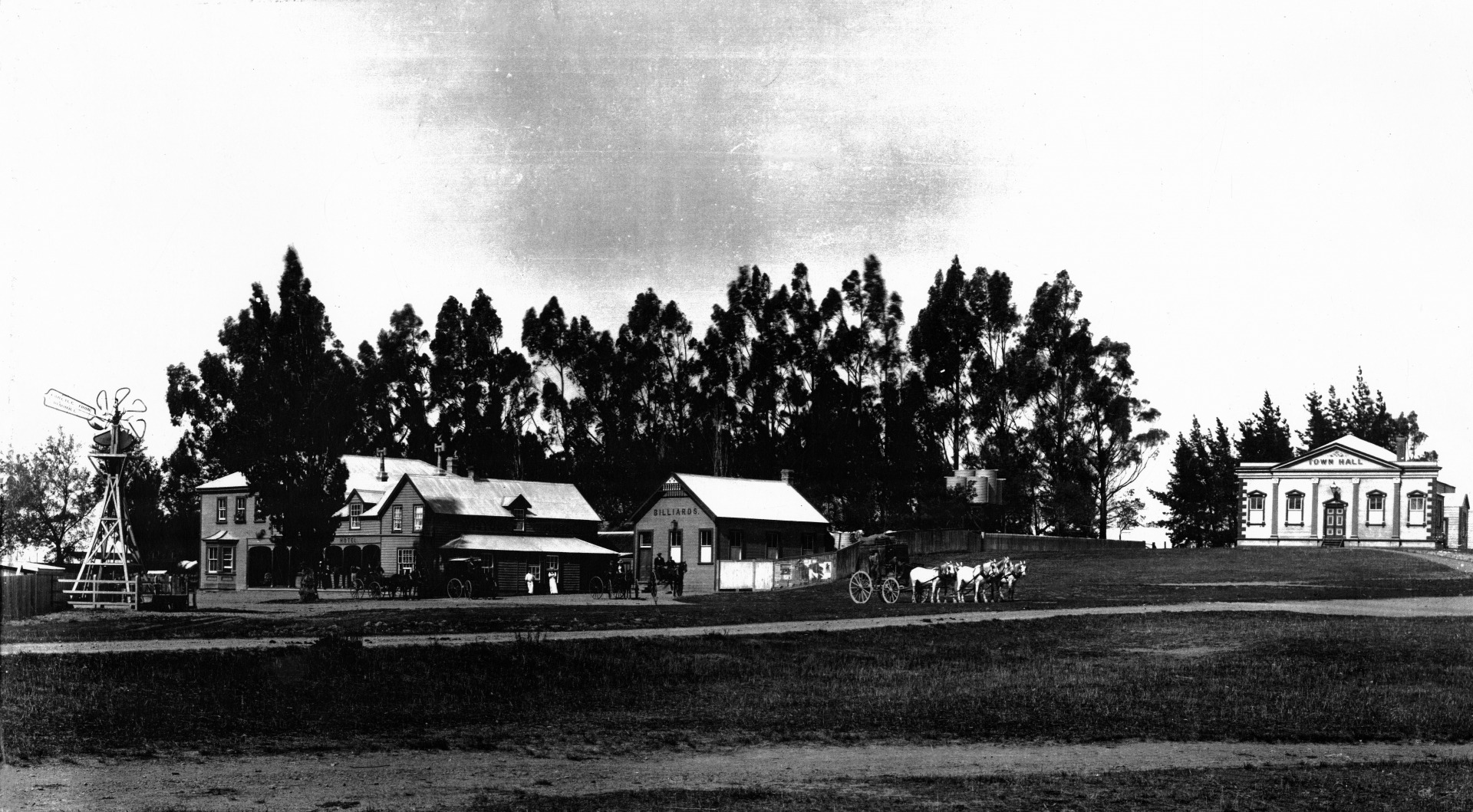
Tavistock Hotel and Town Hall, Waipukurau, probably about 1900

In 1857 there was an accommodation house run by a Mr Aveson. This was sold in October 1858 to George Lloyd and renamed Lloyds Hotel. The Hotel was transferred again in 1861 becoming Moss's Inn or the Tavistock Hotel. It was moved to its present site nearer the railway in 1916 and has been empty since 2013. A Town Hall was built nearby in 1877. It burnt down on 18 November 1922.

Horse racing started in 1859 with the first recorded meeting on 2 February. The provincial council approved construction of roading from Waipukurau to Pōrangahau, a goal, and the appointment of a Constable at Waipukurau in 1859. Roading to Forty-mile bush was not commenced until late 1867.

By at least 1858 Waipukurau was used as a hub for mail delivery to the district, a sale yard for stock, and a court venue. In 1863 land was offered to the Agricultural Society for a show. By 1864 the Presbyterians were looking to set up a church in Waipukurau. There was a school in town by 1866 but this was closed when the building it used was destroyed by fire that year. The school was replaced in August 1867 by new building which was to serve as both a church and a school. The school had 9 pupils.

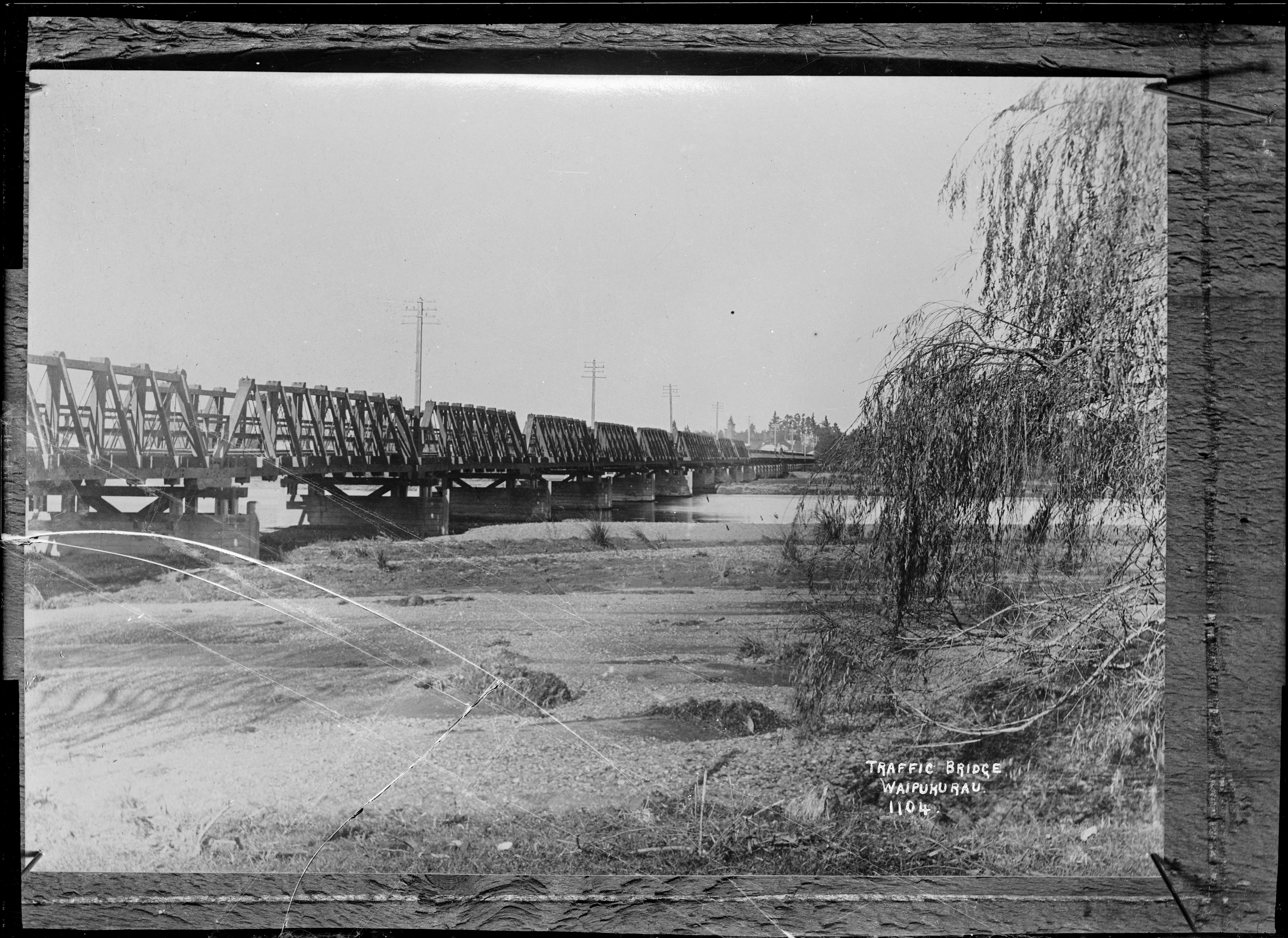
The Waipukurau road bridge across the Tukituki River circa 1910. It was rebuilt in 1923 and replaced in 1935 by a concrete bridge 900 ft (270 m) long

In 1867 Russell acquired the Pa Flat native reserve and founded Waipukurau on it as a model village. Russel chose the residents and approved the house plans.

Cobb and Co commenced the first coach service to the town in October 1867. A coach road to the south reached Norsewood in December 1873 and the Manawatū Gorge in February 1874. Tenders for a coach service from Waipukurau to Palmerston North were called for in March. The contract was awarded to Andrew Young, whose coach operated from Foxton. On his first journey from Foxton to Waipukurau his coach was intercepted by Alexander MacDonald as he was attempting to cross the Oroua River on former Ngāti Kauwhata land near Schultz's Hotel at Awahuri. MacDonald shot one of the lead horses preventing Young from continuing his journey. MacDonald was a staunch supporter of the Ngāti Kauwhata and had been seeking redress for the dispossession of the tribe from its land on 15 December 1866. MacDonald was imprisoned for three months because of this action, but his action did result in the tribe regaining some 6,200 acres of its land.

In October 1867 a dispute broke out between the residents of Waipukurau and the neighbouring township of Waipawa over the location of a telegraph station. The Provincial Council favoured Waipawa as the location. However, the Government's Telegraph Department preferred Waipukurau due its slightly more central location. The office was opened on 9 June 1868. Several weeks later on 22 June Frederick Christian Schäfer, passed through the town. Schäfer was a global traveller from Carlhafen in Hesse-Cassel who had walked through most of Europe, Palestine, two thirds of the way across the United States, Australia, Japan, China, Batavia, and Sumatra. He walked from Wellington to Waipukurau in 18 days.

One of the first sheep shearing competitions in New Zealand took place at Waipukurau in January 1868. Its purpose was to improve the quality of shearing, As a local response to Te Kooti's escape and conflict on the East Coast, a stockade was erected in late 1869, in what is now Hunter Memorial Park.

In November 1869 a Methodist Church was formed in the town. A boiling down works was constructed in March 1870, the same time a brewery was proposed and a flax mill opened.

==== Railway station ====
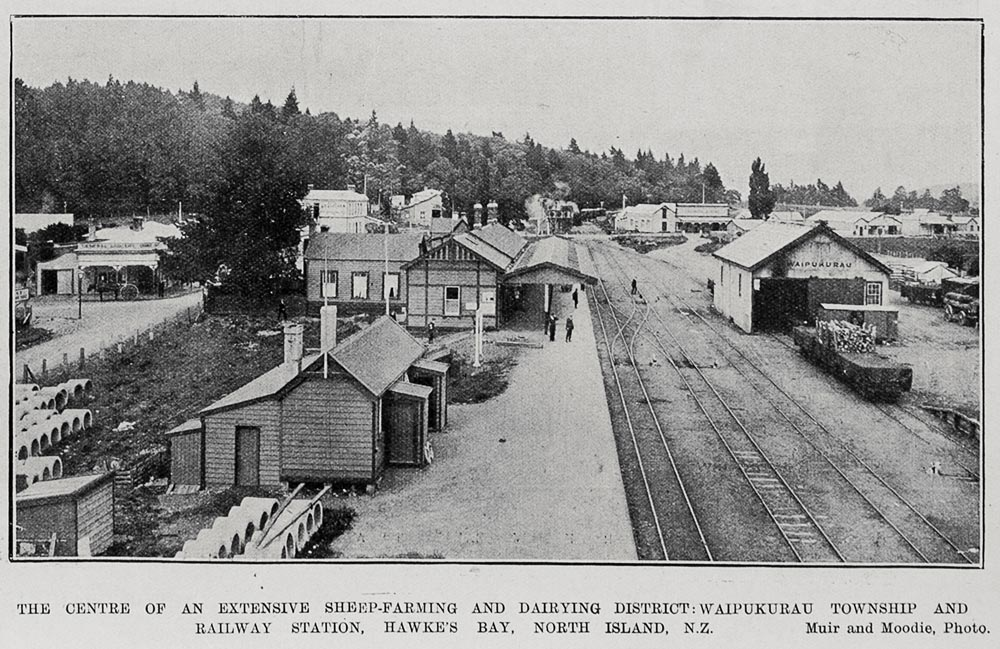
Waipukurau railway station in 1909. The railway plantation of 1877 is in the background. Plantations of oak, larch, chestnut and ash were established near many railway stations

Construction of a railway from Napier to Waipukurau commenced in 1872. The target was to complete the line by September 1873. This was not achieved and the extension to Waipukurau was opened just three days after Waipawa on 1 September 1876. A holiday was declared and two trains ran from Napier to celebrate the opening on Friday 8 September. The link to Palmerston North was not completed until 9 March 1891 due in part to the more difficult country and the impact of the Long Depression. The 4 mi 62.93 ch (7.703 km) extension to Waipukurau was built by the international contractor, Brogdens, for £9,469 7s 9d.

In 1874 Edmund G Allen won a £14,100 contract for the 14 mi (23 km) extension south to Takapau. Waipukurau had been the terminus of the line for just over 6 months, when it opened on 12 March 1877. There were then two trains a day from Napier, one of which continued to Takapau.

In 1875 a station and stationmaster's house were built and a single track engine shed was added in 1877, just north of the station. Sixty years later the shed was leased to Belwood Bitumen Products Ltd. Railway houses were built in 1876, 1883, 1905, 1926 (5), 1931 (2), 1933 (2), 1955 and 1956. Refreshment rooms were built in 1887, or 1888. Trains were then allowed a stop of up to 10 minutes at the station. By then Waipukurau had 3 trains a day from Napier, taking two to three hours to cover the 43 mi 34 ch (69.9 km). By 1896 Waipukurau had a 3rd class station, luggage room, platform, cart approach, 60 ft (18 m) x 30 ft (9.1 m) goods shed (moved from Pakipaki in 1875), loading bank, cattle yards, water, coal shed, turntable (50 ft (15 m), extended in 1921 for the A^{B} class, in 1934 that turntable went to Tāneatua and a 70 ft (21 m) turntable came from Paekakariki in 1936. During the 1979 bridge works that turntable was sent to Masterton), engine shed, stationmaster's house, urinals and a passing loop for 49 wagons. In 1909 electric tablet signalling began between Lower Hutt and Waipukurau. On 24 March 1922 there was a refreshment room fire and the railways took over direct running of them from 1923. On 22 November 1929 the station safe was blown open. By that year, over 30 people were employed at the station, where they sold 20,816 tickets (4th busiest station on the line, after Napier, Hastings and Dannevirke) and handled 13,062 sheep and pigs.

In 1881 Wilding & Bull had a siding and built a large sawmill beside the station. Much of the timber came from Seventy Mile Bush. There were also sidings for a grain store, British Imperial Oil and Vacuum Oil Co.

On 7 October 2001 the station closed to passengers. The platform, station and passing loop remain.

===== Tukituki railway bridge =====
Harry Monteith built a 22-span Waipukurau bridge. A footbridge was added in 1883 and it was repaired in 1897. It was replaced in 1978, at which time the stockyards were closed to improve the alignment of the track to the new bridge. Tuki Tuki River bridge 171 is 288 m (945 ft) long.

===== Tarewa and Tapairu railway stations =====
A mile to the north of Waipukurau, there was a flag station below Mount Vernon from 1877 to 1884. Its closure was announced several times, including in 1886, when the building was moved from Tarewa, to Tapairu, a mile south of Waipawa, which seems to have been open until 1889, or 1890. In 2009 the nearby SH2 road overbridge, which had replaced a level crossing in 1937, was replaced by a larger culvert to straighten the road.

	Former adjoining stations	
Hatuma; Line open, station closed 7.26 km (4.51 mi)	Palmerston North–Gisborne Line	Waipawa; Line open, station closed 7.52 km (4.67 mi)

=== Marae ===
The local Waipukurau Marae is affiliated with the Ngāti Kahungunu hapū of Ngāti Whatuiāpiti and Ngāti Tamatea.

== Geography ==
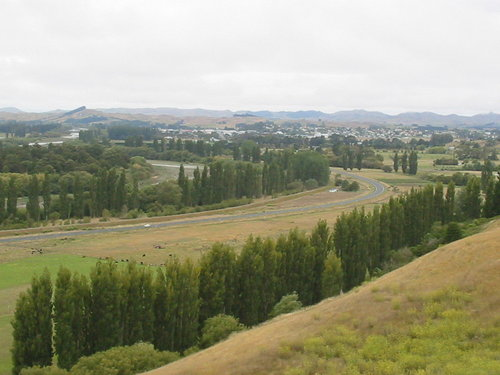
Waipukurau - View from Pukeora

Stats NZ describes Waipukurau as a small urban area, which covers 8.70 km^{2} (3.36 sq mi). It had an estimated population of 4,750 as of June 2025, with a population density of 546 people per km^{2}.

Historical population
Year	Pop.	±% p.a.
2006	4,161	—
2013	3,918	−0.86%
2018	4,416	+2.42%
2023	4,698	+1.25%
The 2006 population is for a smaller area of 8.04 km^{2}. Source:

Waipukurau had a population of 4,698 in the 2023 New Zealand census, an increase of 282 people (6.4%) since the 2018 census, and an increase of 780 people (19.9%) since the 2013 census. There were 2,190 males, 2,493 females, and 15 people of other genders in 1,920 dwellings. 2.4% of people identified as LGBTIQ+. The median age was 45.0 years (compared with 38.1 years nationally). There were 879 people (18.7%) aged under 15 years, 744 (15.8%) aged 15 to 29, 1,863 (39.7%) aged 30 to 64, and 1,209 (25.7%) aged 65 or older.

People could identify as more than one ethnicity. The results were 80.1% European (Pākehā); 30.3% Māori; 3.4% Pasifika; 3.7% Asian; 0.4% Middle Eastern, Latin American and African New Zealanders (MELAA); and 2.2% other, which includes people giving their ethnicity as "New Zealander". English was spoken by 97.4%, Māori by 6.6%, Samoan by 0.2%, and other languages by 4.5%. No language could be spoken by 1.9% (e.g. too young to talk). New Zealand Sign Language was known by 0.4%. The percentage of people born overseas was 11.6, compared with 28.8% nationally.

Religious affiliations were 33.2% Christian, 0.4% Hindu, 0.3% Islam, 3.4% Māori religious beliefs, 0.4% Buddhist, 0.5% New Age, and 1.3% other religions. People who answered that they had no religion were 54.0%, and 7.2% of people did not answer the census question.

Of those at least 15 years old, 450 (11.8%) people had a bachelor's or higher degree, 2,286 (59.9%) had a post-high school certificate or diploma, and 1,083 (28.4%) people exclusively held high school qualifications. The median income was $36,800, compared with $41,500 nationally. 150 people (3.9%) earned over $100,000 compared to 12.1% nationally. The employment status of those at least 15 was 1,794 (47.0%) full-time, 453 (11.9%) part-time, and 108 (2.8%) unemployed.

Individual statistical areas
Name	Area (km^{2})	Population	Density (per km^{2})	Dwellings	Median age	Median income
Waipukurau West	6.44	2,736	425	1,146	44.8 years	$35,800
Waipukurau East	2.26	1,962	868	774	45.3 years	$38,500
New Zealand					38.1 years	$41,500

In December 1858 Waipukurau census area had 243 males and 73 females - a total population of 316. 1,441 acres of land were fenced or cultivated with 95 horses, 364 cattle, and 20,365 sheep. There were also 4 goats and 61 pigs.

The 40th parallel south passes through Waipukurau township.

=== Climate ===
Climate data for Waipukurau Aero (1981–2010 normals, extremes 1945–1994)
Month	Jan	Feb	Mar	Apr	May	Jun	Jul	Aug	Sep	Oct	Nov	Dec	Year
Record high °C (°F)	34.5 (94.1)	35.1 (95.2)	32.5 (90.5)	27.9 (82.2)	26.1 (79.0)	24.1 (75.4)	21.2 (70.2)	21.0 (69.8)	25.2 (77.4)	27.2 (81.0)	29.4 (84.9)	32.3 (90.1)	35.1 (95.2)
Mean daily maximum °C (°F)	24.5 (76.1)	23.8 (74.8)	21.6 (70.9)	18.6 (65.5)	15.7 (60.3)	13.1 (55.6)	12.4 (54.3)	13.3 (55.9)	15.3 (59.5)	17.6 (63.7)	19.7 (67.5)	22.3 (72.1)	18.2 (64.7)
Daily mean °C (°F)	18.2 (64.8)	17.9 (64.2)	16.0 (60.8)	12.9 (55.2)	10.5 (50.9)	8.2 (46.8)	7.7 (45.9)	8.5 (47.3)	10.3 (50.5)	12.2 (54.0)	14.2 (57.6)	16.6 (61.9)	12.8 (55.0)
Mean daily minimum °C (°F)	11.9 (53.4)	12.0 (53.6)	10.4 (50.7)	7.3 (45.1)	5.3 (41.5)	3.2 (37.8)	3.0 (37.4)	3.8 (38.8)	5.3 (41.5)	6.8 (44.2)	8.6 (47.5)	10.9 (51.6)	7.4 (45.3)
Record low °C (°F)	0.9 (33.6)	1.5 (34.7)	−1.2 (29.8)	−2.9 (26.8)	−4.3 (24.3)	−5.9 (21.4)	−7.2 (19.0)	−4.7 (23.5)	−3.3 (26.1)	−3.1 (26.4)	−0.8 (30.6)	0.2 (32.4)	−7.2 (19.0)
Average rainfall mm (inches)	37.9 (1.49)	67.4 (2.65)	82.7 (3.26)	67.6 (2.66)	65.2 (2.57)	78.5 (3.09)	84.3 (3.32)	74.0 (2.91)	74.4 (2.93)	61.9 (2.44)	59.5 (2.34)	82.0 (3.23)	835.4 (32.89)
Source: NIWA

== Education ==
Waipukurau has three long-running primary schools, with relatively stable roll numbers:

- Waipukurau School is a Year 1-8 state primary school established in 1867. It has a roll of 298.
- The Terrace School is a Year 1-8 state primary school established in 1956. It has a roll of 191.
- St Joseph's School is a Year 1–8 state integrated Catholic primary school established in 1926. It has a roll of 105.

Central Hawke's Bay College is a Year 9-13 state secondary school. It has a roll of 573. Waipukerau District High School started in 1920, but with origins from 1866. It merged with Waipawa District High School (established in 1908) in 1958 to form Central Hawke's Bay College from 1959. Some young people also leave Waipukurau at a young age to study in nearby cities of Hastings and Napier.

All these schools are co-educational. Rolls are as of July 2026.

Waipukurau also has branches of five youth organisations: Scouts New Zealand, GirlGuiding New Zealand, New Zealand Cadet Forces, St John Youth and Epic Ministries. Each organisation ranges from 20 to 100 members.

== Hospital ==
In 1876 the Government donated 5 acres of land for a Hospital which was to be half paid for by the local community. It was completed in 1879 and consisted of two wings – the male and female wards, as well as four other rooms to house staff. It also had a dispensary, committee room, dining room, and kitchen. The hospital was the Waipawa County Hospital until 1907. In 1909 a further ward built. In 1919, as a result of the influenza pandemic, an infectious disease annex. This building became the geriatric unit in 1962. A nurses’ home was built in 1926 and extended in 1942.

An administration block was erected in 1927, with the former administration area became a children's ward. In 1935 further alterations were carried out which added a medical administration and outpatients’ wing and an operating theatre . From 1942 to 1964 two new wards, clinics for x-ray and physiotherapy, a laboratory, an administration block, a mortuary, and an operating theatre were added. Finally in 1966 additions were made to the maternity annexe. The hospital was closed in 1999.

== Employment ==
The town is a farming based community and provides dairy, fruit, vegetable and meat exports. Most employment is seasonal related, dependent on surrounding local agricultural and horticultural industries.

Through the 1940s-1970s one of the town's main businesses was Denne Bros/Peter Pan Frozen Foods, well known throughout the country for their ice cream brand. The two factories were considered local landmarks. The company was the main employer of Waipukurau, as well the nearby township Waipawa in the 1950s and 1960s.

== Notable residents ==
- Johannes "Joh" Bjelke-Petersen, KCMG (1911–2005), Premier of Queensland 1968–1987, lived in Waipukurau as a very young child
- Hinewehi Mohi, MNZM, musician and television producer
- Errol Brathwaite - author
- Matt Berquist - professional rugby player
- John Atcherly Cardinal Dew, Archbishop of Wellington (2005–2023); a cardinal elector in the Conclave of 2025 which elected Pope Leo XIV
- Campbell Johnstone - professional rugby player
- Andrew Williams - former North Shore mayor
