= Central Hawke's Bay District =

- Territorial authority district
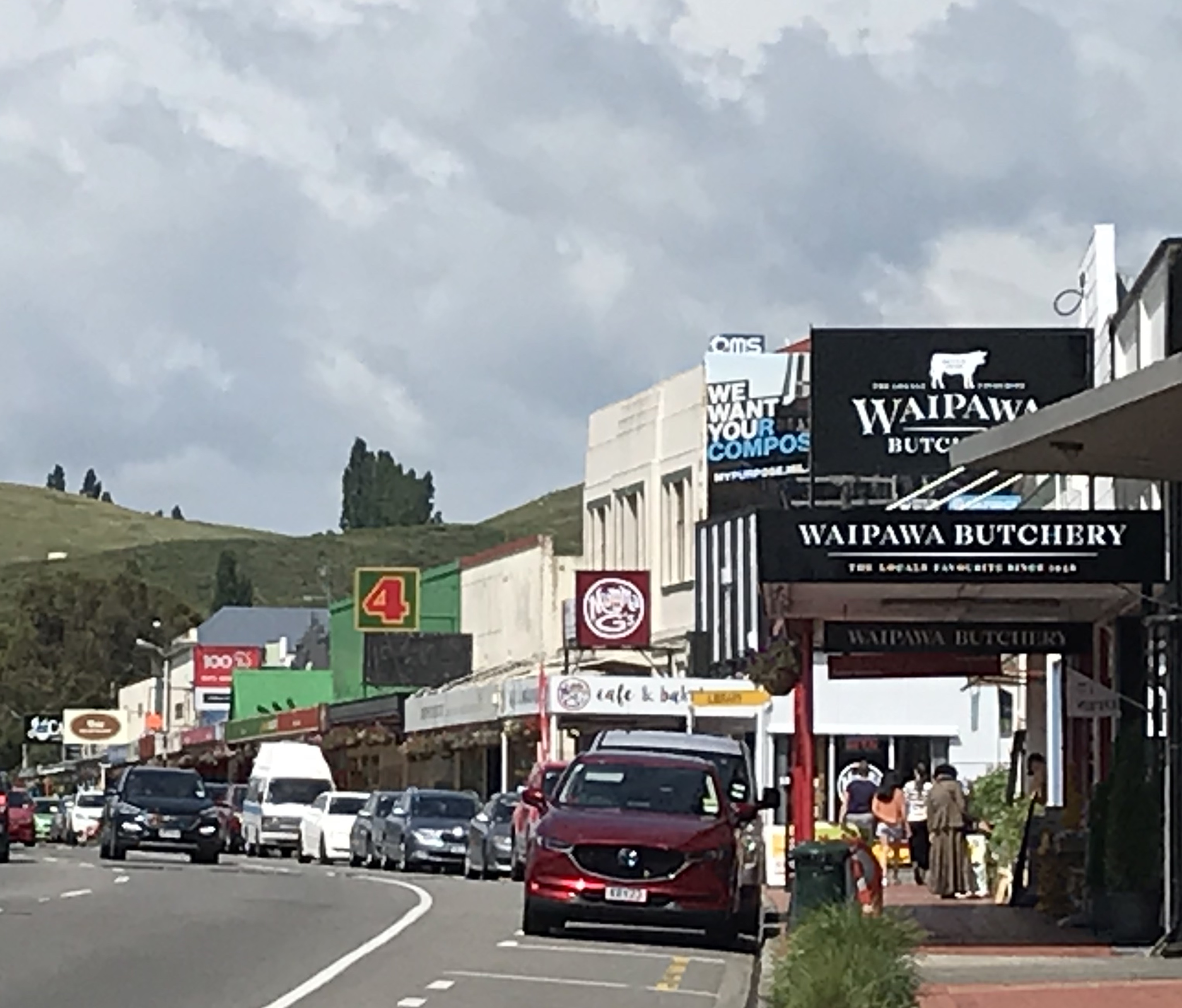
- Waipawa

- Central Hawke's Bay district within the North Island
- Coordinates: 40°02′20″S 176°34′41″E
- Country: New Zealand
- Region: Hawke's Bay
- Wards: Aramoana-Ruahine; Ruataniwha
- Seat: Waipawa

Government
  - Mayor: Will Foley
  - Territorial authority: Central Hawke's Bay District Council

Area
  - Land: 3,332.91 km^{2} (1,286.84 sq mi)

Population (June 2025)
  - Total: 15,950
  - Density: 4.786/km^{2} (12.39/sq mi)
- Time zone: UTC+12 (NZST)
  - Summer (DST): UTC+13 (NZDT)
- Postcode(s): Map of postcodes
- Website: www.chbdc.govt.nz

Central Hawke's Bay District is in the Hawke's Bay Region in the North Island of New Zealand. Formed in 1989, it covers an area of 3,333 square kilometres, from Pukehou in the north to Takapau in the south, and from the western Ruahine Range to the Pacific coast in the east. It has a population of 15,950 (June 2025), up from 14,142 in the 2018 census and 12,717 in the 2013 census.

== Geography ==
The two main towns are Waipukurau (population 4,750) and Waipawa (2,430), which are just 7 kilometres (4.3 mi) apart. Smaller townships include Ōtāne, Takapau, Tikokino and Ongaonga. There are also several small beach communities, including Kairakau, Pourerere, Aramoana, Blackhead and Pōrangahau.

There is a marae in each of the four corners of the district, at Pukehou, Kairakau, Pōrangahau and Takapau.

== Local government ==
The district is administered by the Central Hawke's Bay District Council, which was formed through the 1989 local government reforms by amalgamating Waipukurau District Council and the Waipawa District Council. The district is divided into two wards: Ruataniwha is an urban ward based on the towns of Waipukurau and Waipawa; Aramoana-Ruahine is a largely rural ward. The council seat is in Waipawa.

== Demographics ==
Central Hawke's Bay District covers 3,332.91 km^{2} (1,286.84 sq mi) and had an estimated population of 15,950 as of June 2025, with a population density of 4.8 people per km^{2}.

Historical population
Year	Pop.	±% p.a.
2006	12,957	—
2013	12,717	−0.27%
2018	14,142	+2.15%
2023	15,480	+1.82%

Central Hawke's Bay District had a population of 15,480 in the 2023 New Zealand census, an increase of 1,338 people (9.5%) since the 2018 census, and an increase of 2,763 people (21.7%) since the 2013 census. There were 7,560 males, 7,881 females and 39 people of other genders in 5,949 dwellings. 1.9% of people identified as LGBTIQ+. The median age was 43.5 years (compared with 38.1 years nationally). There were 3,150 people (20.3%) aged under 15 years, 2,181 (14.1%) aged 15 to 29, 6,861 (44.3%) aged 30 to 64, and 3,288 (21.2%) aged 65 or older.

People could identify as more than one ethnicity. The results were 83.9% European (Pākehā); 25.2% Māori; 3.1% Pasifika; 2.9% Asian; 0.4% Middle Eastern, Latin American and African New Zealanders (MELAA); and 2.6% other, which includes people giving their ethnicity as "New Zealander". English was spoken by 97.6%, Māori language by 5.2%, Samoan by 0.6% and other languages by 4.5%. No language could be spoken by 2.0% (e.g. too young to talk). New Zealand Sign Language was known by 0.5%. The percentage of people born overseas was 12.9, compared with 28.8% nationally.

Religious affiliations were 32.1% Christian, 0.3% Hindu, 0.2% Islam, 2.0% Māori religious beliefs, 0.3% Buddhist, 0.6% New Age, and 1.0% other religions. People who answered that they had no religion were 56.7%, and 7.3% of people did not answer the census question.

Of those at least 15 years old, 1,518 (12.3%) people had a bachelor's or higher degree, 7,218 (58.5%) had a post-high school certificate or diploma, and 3,117 (25.3%) people exclusively held high school qualifications. The median income was $38,800, compared with $41,500 nationally. 804 people (6.5%) earned over $100,000 compared to 12.1% nationally. The employment status of those at least 15 was that 6,273 (50.9%) people were employed full-time, 1,725 (14.0%) were part-time, and 279 (2.3%) were unemployed.

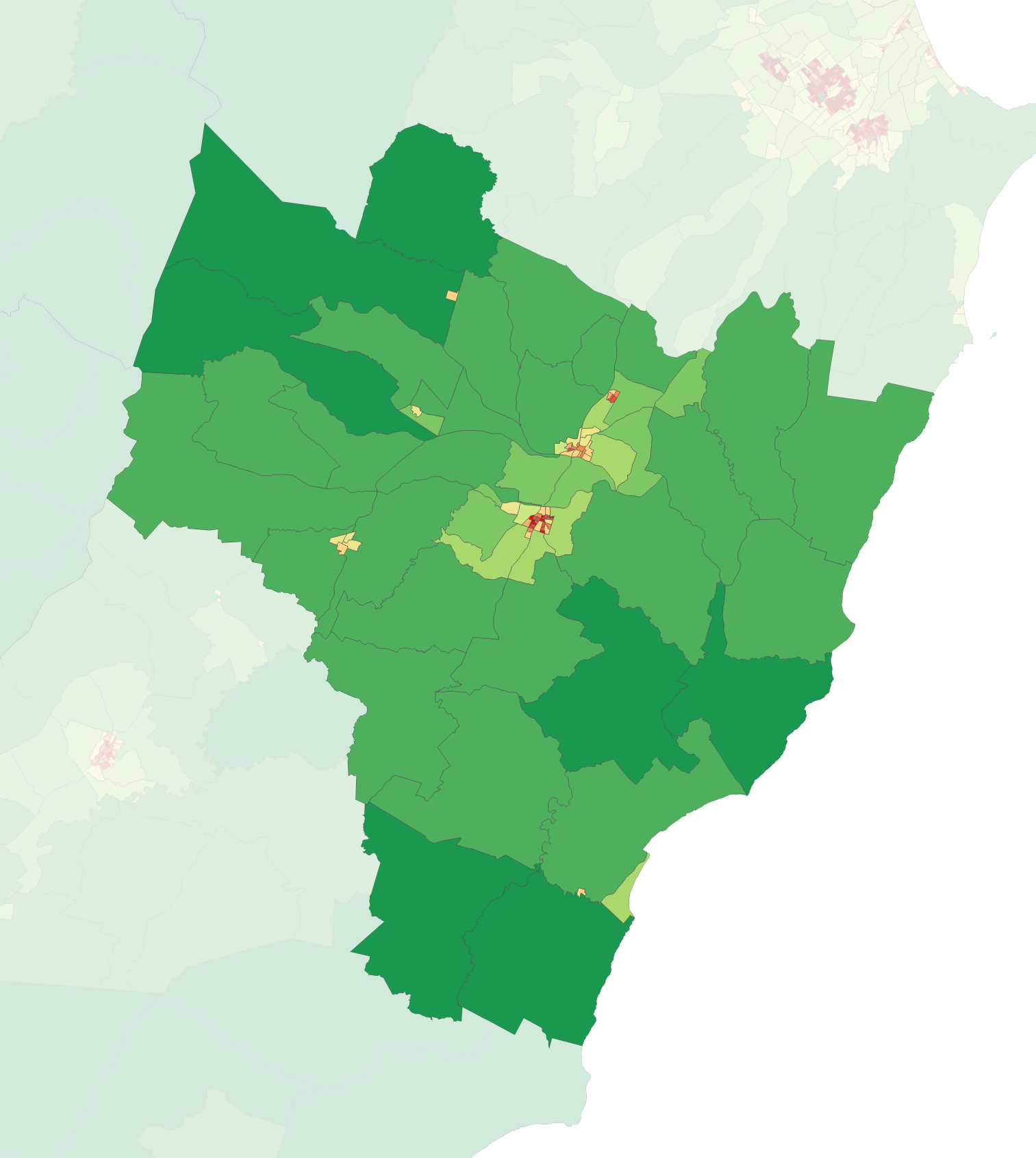
Population density in the 2023 census

Individual wards
Name	Area (km^{2})	Population	Density (per km^{2})	Dwellings	Median age	Median income
Aramoana-Ruahine Ward	3,272.94	7,725	2.4	2,853	42.9 years	$40,600
Ruataniwha Ward	59.97	7,758	129.4	3,093	44.1 years	$37,300
New Zealand					38.1 years	$41,500

== Transportation ==
State Highway 2 runs through the centre of Central Hawke's Bay, leading south to Palmerston North (108 km) and the Wairarapa and north to Hastings (50 km) and Napier. It is 70 kilometres to Napier Port and 75 kilometres to Napier Airport. The Palmerston North – Gisborne railway line runs through the district, with one station at Waipukurau. This line connects to the Wairarapa Line at Woodville, and continues through the Manawatū Gorge to Palmerston North.
