= Waipawa =

Town in Hawke's Bay, New Zealand

- Minor urban area
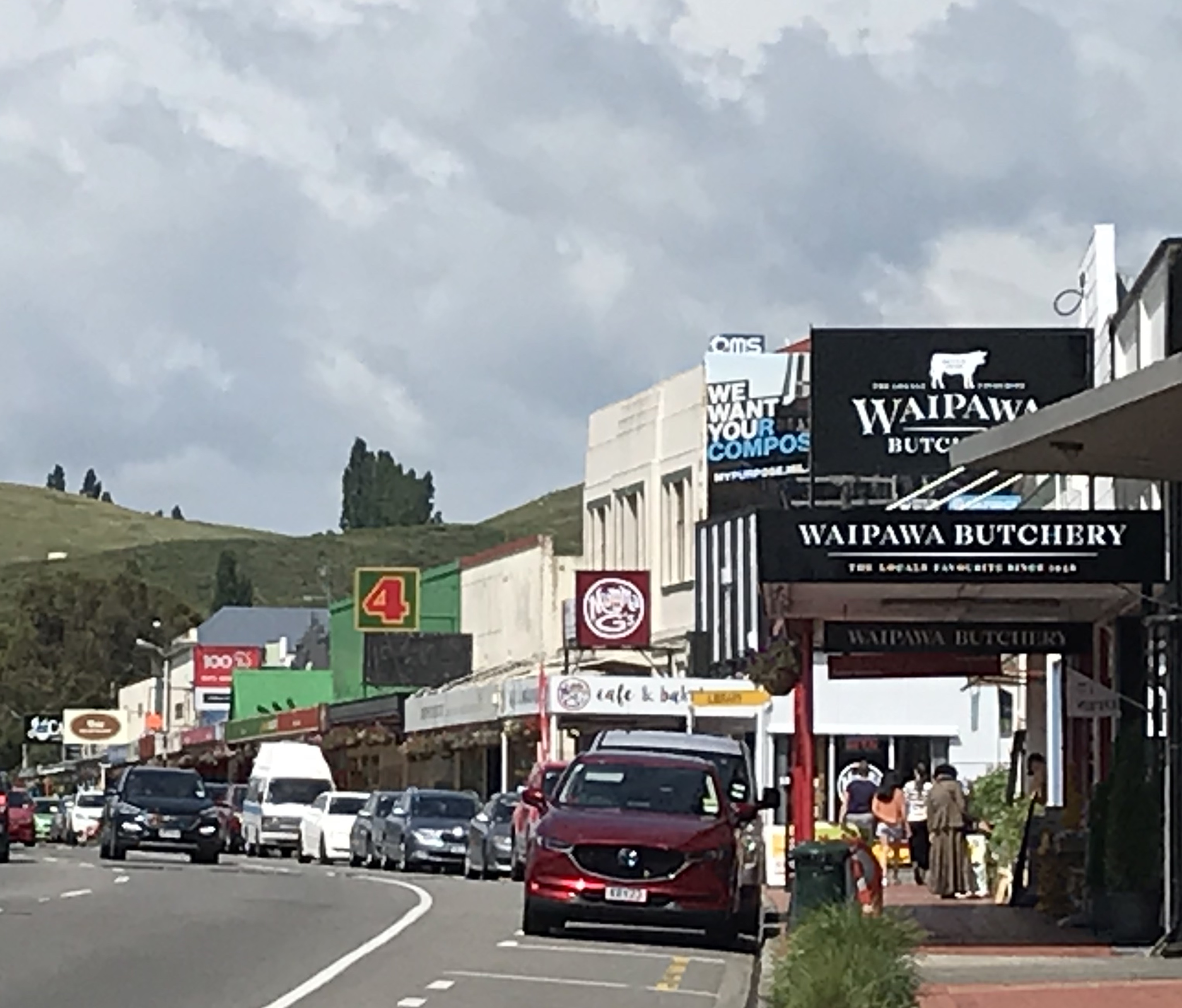
- Interactive map of Waipawa
- Coordinates: 39°56′S 176°35′E
- Country: New Zealand
- Region: Hawke's Bay
- Territorial authority: Central Hawke's Bay District
- Ward: Ruataniwha
- Electorates: Wairarapa; Ikaroa-Rāwhiti (Māori)

Government
  - Territorial Authority: Central Hawke's Bay District Council
  - Regional council: Hawke's Bay Regional Council
  - Mayor of Central Hawke's Bay: Will Foley
  - Wairarapa MP: Mike Butterick
  - Ikaroa-Rāwhiti MP: Cushla Tangaere-Manuel

Area
  - Total: 6.80 km^{2} (2.63 sq mi)

Population (June 2025)
  - Total: 2,430
  - Density: 357/km^{2} (926/sq mi)
- Postcode(s): 4210

Waipawa is the second-largest town in Central Hawke's Bay in the east of the North Island of New Zealand. It has a population of 2,430 (June 2025).

The town is located 7 kilometres (4.3 mi) northeast of Waipukurau and 46 km (29 mi) southwest of Hastings, on the northern bank of the Waipawa River, a tributary of the Tukituki River. Waipawa was settled in the early 1860s.

It holds the main office of the Central Hawke's Bay District Council, and is New Zealand's oldest inland European settlement.

Frederick Abbot was one of the early settlers and Waipawa was originally called Abbotsford, when the township was being sold in 1859, and there is still a children's home in Waipawa named Abbotsford. However, it was often shown as Abbotsford, Waipawa and Waipawa was more commonly used alone after the opening of the Waipawa railway station and Waipawa Mail in the late 1870s.

A local newspaper, the Waipawa Mail, was published for most of the period from 1878 to 1980. It was one of 45 started by Joseph Ivess. In 1980 it merged to become the CHB Mail, which is now a free weekly paper, published in Waipukurau.

== Demographics ==
Stats NZ describes Waipawa as a small urban area, which covers 6.80 km^{2} (2.63 sq mi). It had an estimated population of 2,430 as of June 2025, with a population density of 357 people per km^{2}.

Historical population
Year	Pop.	±% p.a.
2006	1,926	—
2013	1,971	+0.33%
2018	2,085	+1.13%
2023	2,334	+2.28%

Waipāwa had a population of 2,334 in the 2023 New Zealand census, an increase of 249 people (11.9%) since the 2018 census, and an increase of 363 people (18.4%) since the 2013 census. There were 1,098 males, 1,230 females, and 9 people of other genders in 891 dwellings. 2.3% of people identified as LGBTIQ+. The median age was 41.7 years (compared with 38.1 years nationally). There were 507 people (21.7%) aged under 15 years, 318 (13.6%) aged 15 to 29, 1,044 (44.7%) aged 30 to 64, and 465 (19.9%) aged 65 or older.

People could identify as more than one ethnicity. The results were 84.2% European (Pākehā); 26.3% Māori; 5.7% Pasifika; 1.9% Asian; 0.9% Middle Eastern, Latin American and African New Zealanders (MELAA); and 2.3% other, which includes people giving their ethnicity as "New Zealander". English was spoken by 97.4%, Māori by 5.5%, Samoan by 1.3%, and other languages by 4.9%. No language could be spoken by 2.3% (e.g. too young to talk). New Zealand Sign Language was known by 0.6%. The percentage of people born overseas was 14.0, compared with 28.8% nationally.

Religious affiliations were 27.8% Christian, 0.3% Hindu, 0.1% Islam, 1.9% Māori religious beliefs, 0.3% Buddhist, 0.6% New Age, 0.1% Jewish, and 1.0% other religions. People who answered that they had no religion were 61.4%, and 7.1% of people did not answer the census question.

Of those at least 15 years old, 282 (15.4%) people had a bachelor's or higher degree, 1,041 (57.0%) had a post-high school certificate or diploma, and 501 (27.4%) people exclusively held high school qualifications. The median income was $37,900, compared with $41,500 nationally. 99 people (5.4%) earned over $100,000 compared to 12.1% nationally. The employment status of those at least 15 was 909 (49.8%) full-time, 240 (13.1%) part-time, and 48 (2.6%) unemployed.

== Marae ==
Waipawa has two marae affiliated with the iwi of Ngāti Kahungunu. The Mataweka Marae and Nohomaiterangi meeting house are affiliated with the hapū of Ngāi Toroiwaho and Ngāti Whatuiāpiti. The Tapairu Marae and Te Rangitahi or Te Whaea o te Katoa meeting house are affiliated with the hapū of Ngāti Mārau o Kahungunu.

In October 2020, the Government committed $887,291 from the Provincial Growth Fund to upgrade the two marae and three others, creating 12 jobs.

== Education ==
Waipawa School is a Year 1-8 co-educational state primary school. It is a decile 3 school with a roll of 332 as of July 2026. The school opened in 1862.

Waipawa used to have a secondary school, Waipawa District High School. This was merged in 1959 with Waipukurau District High School to make Central Hawke's Bay College based in Waipukurau.

Waipawa has been home to several youth organisations. Namely, the New Zealand Cadet Forces's ATC branch, as well as a Scouts New Zealand branch. However, since 2000, both major youth organisations have gone into recess.

== Waipawa railway station ==
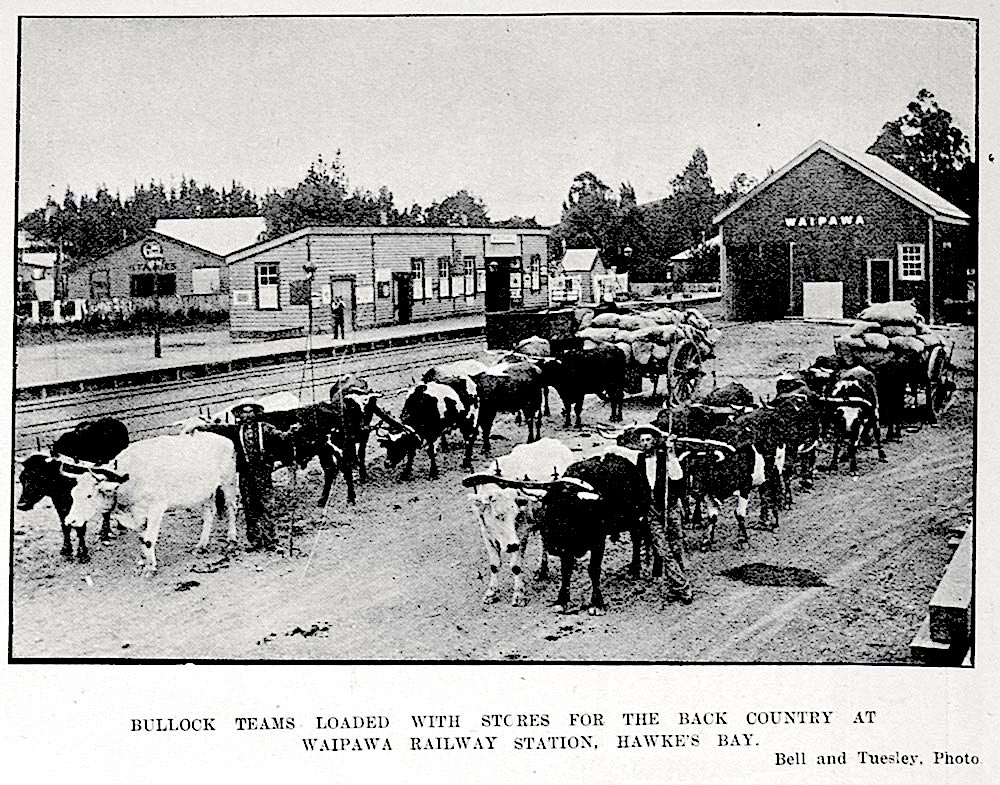
Waipawa railway station in 1905

From at least 1870 Waipawa was served by mail coaches running between Napier and Waipukurau.

On 6 December 1981 the station closed to passengers, it was an unattended station from 20 November 1983, closed to all but parcels on 18 August 1984 and closed completely on 2 November 1984. By 1987 only a platform and goods shed remained. The platform, goods shed and a single track still remain.

	Former adjoining stations	
Waipukurau; Line open, station closed 7.52 km (4.67 mi)	Palmerston North–Gisborne Line	Ōtāne; Line open, station closed 5.81 km (3.61 mi)

== Climate ==
Climate data for Waipawa (1991–2020 normals, extremes 2007–present)
Month	Jan	Feb	Mar	Apr	May	Jun	Jul	Aug	Sep	Oct	Nov	Dec	Year
Record high °C (°F)	35.4 (95.7)	36.9 (98.4)	30.8 (87.4)	27.9 (82.2)	26.9 (80.4)	23.4 (74.1)	19.8 (67.6)	23.8 (74.8)	25.3 (77.5)	30.5 (86.9)	29.5 (85.1)	30.6 (87.1)	36.9 (98.4)
Mean daily maximum °C (°F)	24.5 (76.1)	24.1 (75.4)	21.9 (71.4)	19.0 (66.2)	16.3 (61.3)	13.3 (55.9)	12.6 (54.7)	13.7 (56.7)	15.8 (60.4)	18.0 (64.4)	20.1 (68.2)	22.3 (72.1)	18.5 (65.2)
Daily mean °C (°F)	18.0 (64.4)	18.0 (64.4)	15.8 (60.4)	13.1 (55.6)	10.7 (51.3)	8.1 (46.6)	7.6 (45.7)	8.4 (47.1)	10.3 (50.5)	12.1 (53.8)	13.9 (57.0)	16.3 (61.3)	12.7 (54.8)
Mean daily minimum °C (°F)	11.5 (52.7)	11.8 (53.2)	9.6 (49.3)	7.2 (45.0)	5.0 (41.0)	2.8 (37.0)	2.5 (36.5)	3.1 (37.6)	4.8 (40.6)	6.3 (43.3)	7.8 (46.0)	10.3 (50.5)	6.9 (44.4)
Record low °C (°F)	1.8 (35.2)	3.3 (37.9)	0.8 (33.4)	−1.5 (29.3)	−4.3 (24.3)	−3.4 (25.9)	−4.4 (24.1)	−3.8 (25.2)	−3.2 (26.2)	−3.2 (26.2)	−1.9 (28.6)	1.1 (34.0)	−4.4 (24.1)
Average rainfall mm (inches)	65.3 (2.57)	55.1 (2.17)	60.2 (2.37)	79.6 (3.13)	59.6 (2.35)	79.0 (3.11)	101.4 (3.99)	61.3 (2.41)	64.5 (2.54)	66.5 (2.62)	56.4 (2.22)	60.7 (2.39)	809.6 (31.87)
Mean monthly sunshine hours	256.0	199.6	196.4	169.8	162.1	124.7	139.6	158.4	186.5	212.2	233.3	220.6	2,259.2
Source: NIWA
