= Mayor of Central Hawke's Bay =

- Coat of arms of Central Hawke's Bay
- Incumbent; Will Foley since 2025
- Style: His/Her Worship
- Term length: Three years, renewable
- Inaugural holder: Hugh Hamilton
- Formation: 1989
- Salary: $119,272
- Website: Official website

The mayor of Central Hawke's Bay officiates over the Central Hawke's Bay District Council.

Central Hawke's Bay District was formed through the 1989 local government reforms by amalgamating Waipukurau and Waipawa districts. The inaugural mayor was Hugh Hamilton who served for two terms from 1989 to 1995.

The current mayor of Central Hawke's Bay is Will Foley.

== List of mayors ==
Since its formation in 1989, Central Hawke's Bay District has had six mayors. The following is a complete list:

	Name	Portrait	Term of office
1	Hugh Hamilton		1989–1995
2	Hamish Kynoch		1995–2001
3	Tim Gilbertson		2001–2007
4	Trish Giddens		2007–2010
5	Peter Butler		2010–2016
6	Alex Walker		2016–2025
7	Will Foley		2025–present

=== List of deputy mayors ===
Name	Term	Mayor
Trish Giddens	2004–2007	Gilbertson
Unknown	2007–2010	Giddens
Ian Sharp	2010–2019	Butler
Ian Sharp	2010–2019	Walker
Ian Sharp	2010–2019	Walker
Kelly Annand	2019–2025	Walker
Jerry Greer	2025–present	Foley
