= Central Hawke's Bay District Council =

Territorial authority in New Zealand

Coordinates: 39.9441448°S 176.5822655°E

Central Hawke's Bay District Council Te Kaunihera a Rohe o Tamatea
- Territorial authority
- Coat of arms of Central Hawke's Bay

- Council ward map

Type
- Type: Unicameral

History
- Founded: 6 March 1989, 37 years ago
- Preceded by: Waipukurau District Council; Waipara District Council

Leadership
- Mayor: Will Foley
- CEO: Doug Tate

Structure
- Seats: 9 seats (1 mayor, 8 ward seats)
- Political groups: Independent (9) (Note: includes councillors that had unique and non-notable affiliations)
- Length of term: 3 years, renewable

Elections
- Voting system: First-past-the-post
- Last election: 11 October 2025
- Next election: 2028

Website
- chbdc.govt.nz

Central Hawke's Bay District Council (Māori: Te Kaunihera a Rohe o Tamatea) is the territorial authority for the Central Hawke's Bay District of New Zealand.

The council covers the towns of Waipawa and Waipukurau, and the surrounding rural communities. The council is the result of the Waipukurau District Council and Waipara District Council merging in 1989.

The council is led by the mayor of Central Hawke's Bay, who is currently Will Foley.

== Composition ==
Central Hawke's Bay District Council is made up of one mayor and eight councillors. The district is divided into two wards, which each elect four councillors. Ruataniwha is an urban ward based on the towns of Waipukurau and Waipawa. Aramoana-Ruahine is a largely rural ward. The council seat is in Waipawa. The mayor is elected at large. The council seat is in Waipawa.

Current council
Ward	Councillor	Affiliation	First elected
Mayor	Will Foley	None	2025
Ruataniwha	Pip Burne	Your voice, our community	2022
Ruataniwha	Todd Chote	None	2025
Ruataniwha	Kirsty Lawrence	Independent	2025
Aramoana-Ruahine	Jerry Greer	None	2019
Aramoana-Ruahine	Brent Muggeridge	Independent	2016
Aramoana-Ruahine	Kate Taylor	None	2019
At Large	Gerard Minehan	Your Local Voice at the Council table	2016
At Large	Kelly Annand	None	2013
Rautahi Māori Ward	Amiria Nepe Apatu	None	2025

== History ==
The origins of the council date back to the Waipawa County Council, established in 1876.

Patangata County Council split off in 1885. Waipukurau County Council, Waipukurau Borough Council, Patangata County Council, Woodville County Council, Dannevirke County Council, and Waipawa Borough Council split off in 1908.

Waipukurau County Council merged with Patangata County Council in 1974 and Waipukurau Borough Council in 1977 to form Waipukurau District Council.

The other councils merged in 1978, to form Waipawa District Council.

Waipukurau District Council and Waipawa District Council merged in 1989, to create the modern council.

=== 2022–2025 term ===
==== Māori wards ====
Following the decision of the Sixth National Government to force local councils to either abolish Māori wards or hold a referendum on their continued existence, the council voted in a 5–4 decision to retain them and thus to hold a referendum, to occur alongside the 2025 local elections.

Vote to retain Māori wards
Ward	For	Against
	Alex Walker (mayor)	
Aramoana/Ruahine	Kate Taylor	Jerry Greer
Aramoana/Ruahine	Kate Taylor	Tim Aitken
Aramoana/Ruahine	Kate Taylor	Brent Muggeridge
Ruataniwha	Kelly Annand (DM)	Gerard Minehan
Ruataniwha	Pip Burne	Gerard Minehan
Ruataniwha	Exham Wichman	Gerard Minehan
Total	5	4

The referendum result was not to retain the Māori ward, which will apply to the 2028 and 2031 local council elections.
