= Piripiri, Manawatū-Whanganui =

Piripiri
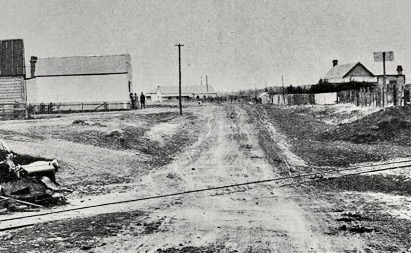
- Piripiri in 1913
- Interactive map of Piripiri
- Coordinates: 40°10′28″S 176°07′59″E
- Country: New Zealand
- Region: Manawatū-Whanganui
- Territorial authority: Tararua District
- Ward: North Tararua Ward
- Electorates: Wairarapa; Ikaroa-Rāwhiti (Māori)

Government
  - Tararua Mayor: Scott Gilmore
  - Wairarapa MP: TBD
  - Ikaroa-Rāwhiti MP: Cushla Tangaere-Manuel

Area
  - Total: 21.86 km^{2} (8.44 sq mi)

Population (2023)
  - Total: 132
  - Density: 6.04/km^{2} (15.6/sq mi)
- Time zone: UTC+12 (NZST)
  - Summer (DST): UTC+13 (NZDT)
- Postcode: 4978

Piripiri (sometimes called Piri Piri) is a sparsely populated area in the Tararua District, in the Manawatū-Whanganui Region, on State Highway 2 and the Palmerston North–Gisborne line. It is 3 mi 8 ch (5.0 km) north of Dannevirke, and has 150 people (2018 census) scattered over a meshblock of 21.8 km^{2} (8.4 sq mi).

Piri means to cling. The Māori name of a clinging plant, piripiri (Acaena anserinifolia), is Anglicised as bidibid.

Piripiri : Refers to the seed of the hutiwai plant and often used for the hutiwai plant itself. Piripiri is the name of a land block, North of Dannevirke. [Piripiri = bidibidi]

Other places named Piripiri are -

- Piripiri Stream, a tributary of the Pohangina River, on the opposite side of the Ruahine Range from Piripiri, with Piripiri Hut, a free 2-bunk hut, by its headwaters
- a small settlement in the Waitomo District, with Mangapohue Natural Bridge and Piripiri Caves nearby
- Te Piripiri Stream, a tributary of the Tongariro River
- Te Piripiri Bay, Lake Waikaremoana
- Piripiri Point, Auckland, on Te Araroa long distance walkway, north of Pōhutukawa Bay
- a 970 m (3,180 ft) mountain above Picton in the Robertson Range

Piripiri had a cheese factory from at least 1910 to 1935.

The local post office, called Matatera, opened in 1909, or 1910. Piripiri PO closed in 1913 and Matatera was renamed Piripiri in 1923.

== History ==
The area was part of the Ngāti Raukawa rohe. In 1870 the Native Land Court designated the Piripiri block as 18,014 acres (7,290 ha), with a ban on sales. In 1887 the Court ruled that compensation for 44 acres (18 ha) taken by the Crown should be £67 19s, rather than the £25 to £45 per acre asked for by the owners. The ban on sales was removed in 1893 and in 1898 the Crown was allocated 17,056 acres (6,902 ha), 6 non-sellers being left with 913 acres (369 ha), which has now been sold. Piripiri had a population of 70 in 1901, 229 in 1911, 84 in 1951 and 89 in 1961.

=== State Highway 2 ===
Contracts to clear a line, 66 ft (20 m) wide, through the Seventy Mile bush, for a road, were let in 1871. 1 1/2 mi (2.4 km) at the Piripiri Clearing was gravelled in 1881, though in 1882 the bush was still so dense that the trees kept the sun off the road, so it was felled in 1883. It was designated as a Main Highway in 1924, which later became SH2. Between October 2014 and September 2016 NZTA Central Region replaced a narrow bridge over the stream with a culvert and 150,000 m^{3} (5,300,000 cu ft) of fill, 120 m (390 ft) long, 6 m (20 ft) wide and 3 m (9.8 ft) high, on a reinforced concrete slab foundation and a Super-Cor Arch Culvert (corrugated iron and concrete), with 16 m (52 ft) of rockfill on it, some 3 m (9.8 ft) lower than the previous bridge. The previous 1927 bridge, which replaced a level crossing, was a 22 m (72 ft) high viaduct, 5.79 m (19.0 ft) wide between kerbs and 58 m (190 ft) long, with a reinforced concrete deck. There had been a fatal crash at the level crossing in 1913.

Piripiri railway station
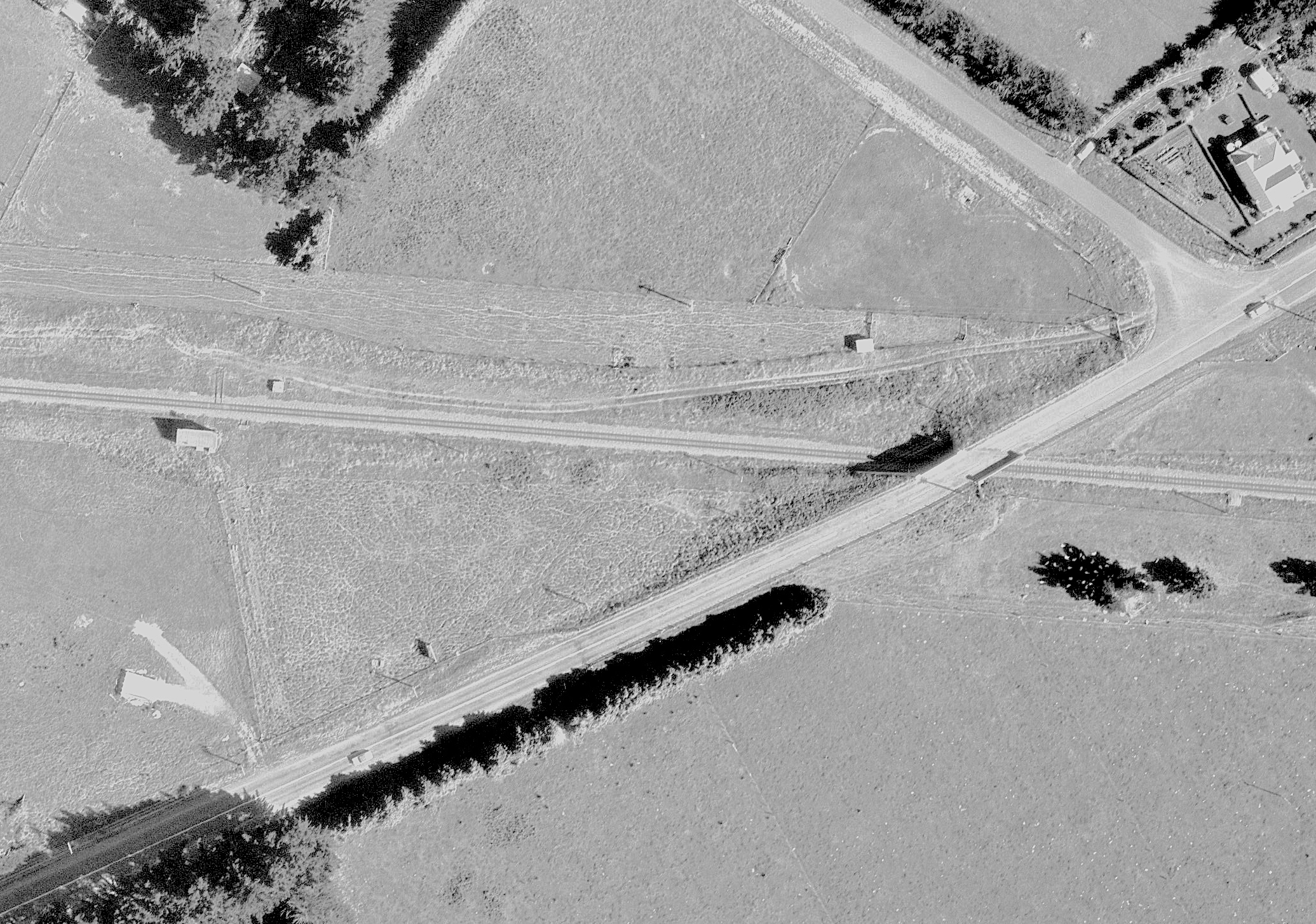
- Piripiri in 1966

General information
- Elevation: 249 m (817 ft)
- Owner: KiwiRail
- Line: Palmerston North–Gisborne Line
- Distance: Palmerston North 63.8 km (39.6 mi)

History
- Opened: 10 August 1894
- Closed: 16 November 1958

Services
Preceding station	Historical railways	Following station
Mangatera; Line open, station closed 2.31 km (1.44 mi)	Palmerston North–Gisborne Line; KiwiRail	Matamau; Line open, station closed 5.3 km (3.3 mi)
Location

=== Railway station ===
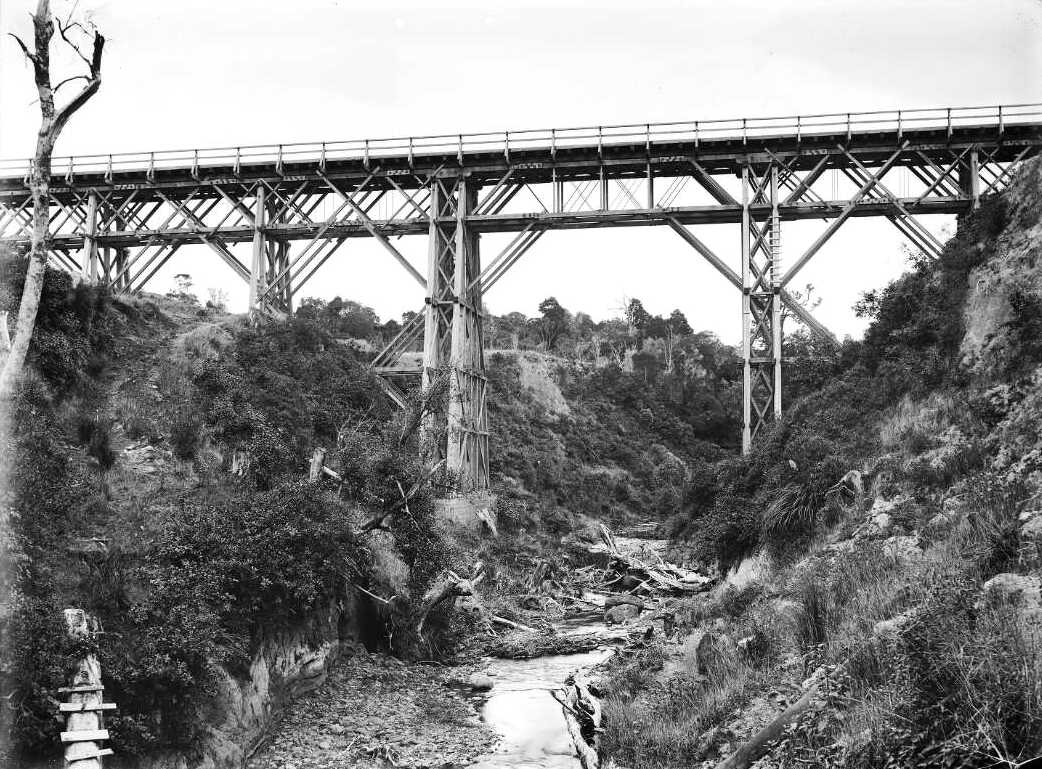
Whakaruatapu Stream and Piripiri viaduct about 1887

Piripiri had a railway station from 1896 to 1958. It was 74 mi 76 ch (120.6 km) chains south of Napier and 36 mi 68 ch (59.3 km) north of Palmerston North Central. A siding opened in 1894, a decade after the line was built. Its main purpose was to carry timber from the dense Seventy Mile bush, through which the railway had been cut.

By 1879 the line to about 2 mi (3.2 km) north of Piripiri had been surveyed, and from there, through Piripiri to Oringi, surveying of another 10 mi (16 km) was being done. Although the line through Piripiri to Tahoraiti was reported as ready to open on 1 December 1884, it wasn't until 15 December 1884 that the 7 mi 43 ch (12.1 km) Matamau to Tahoraiti section opened, extending the line from Napier. The surrounding bush was leased in 1892, but an 1891 application for loading of firewood was refused, as it was said to be too close to Mangatera. Piripiri siding opened on 10 August 1894, but for use only by Rathbone & Mathews. In 1896 it had a loop for 4 wagons.

From Monday, 1 June 1896 passenger trains called at the station, though no buildings were provided. From 15 August 1898 mixed trains stopped for parcels. By 1905 the station had a shelter shed with storeroom and cart approach to a platform and a passing loop for 35 wagons. A urinal was added in 1915. In 1966 Piripiri had a shelter very similar to the one which remains at Matamau.

Also in 1894 Thomas Baker laid a tramway for Robert Holt's sawmill, which was milling kahikatea, mataī, rimu and totara An 1898 fire burnt down their mill, but it had a 24-wagon siding in 1900, which was taken over by the Lands Department in 1908. It remained open for all to use until at least 1914.

In 1900 Gamman built a new mill. A 1902 photo showed 22 workers at the mill. Gamman also had mills around the region at Ākitio, Bunnythorpe, Kumeroa, Manakau, Ohakune and Tahoraiti. From 1899 to 1909 Gamman's had a 15-wagon siding 30 ch (2,000 ft; 600 m) north of the station.

The government bought the land in 1903, the timber leases ended in 1909 and 16,125 acres (6,526 ha) were sold to farming settlers. The bush had largely gone by 1908 and the mills ran out of timber to fell after 1923. On 1 July 1938 Piripiri became a tablet switch-out station.

On Sunday 16 November 1958 Piripiri closed to all traffic. A single track runs through the station site.

Piripiri viaduct
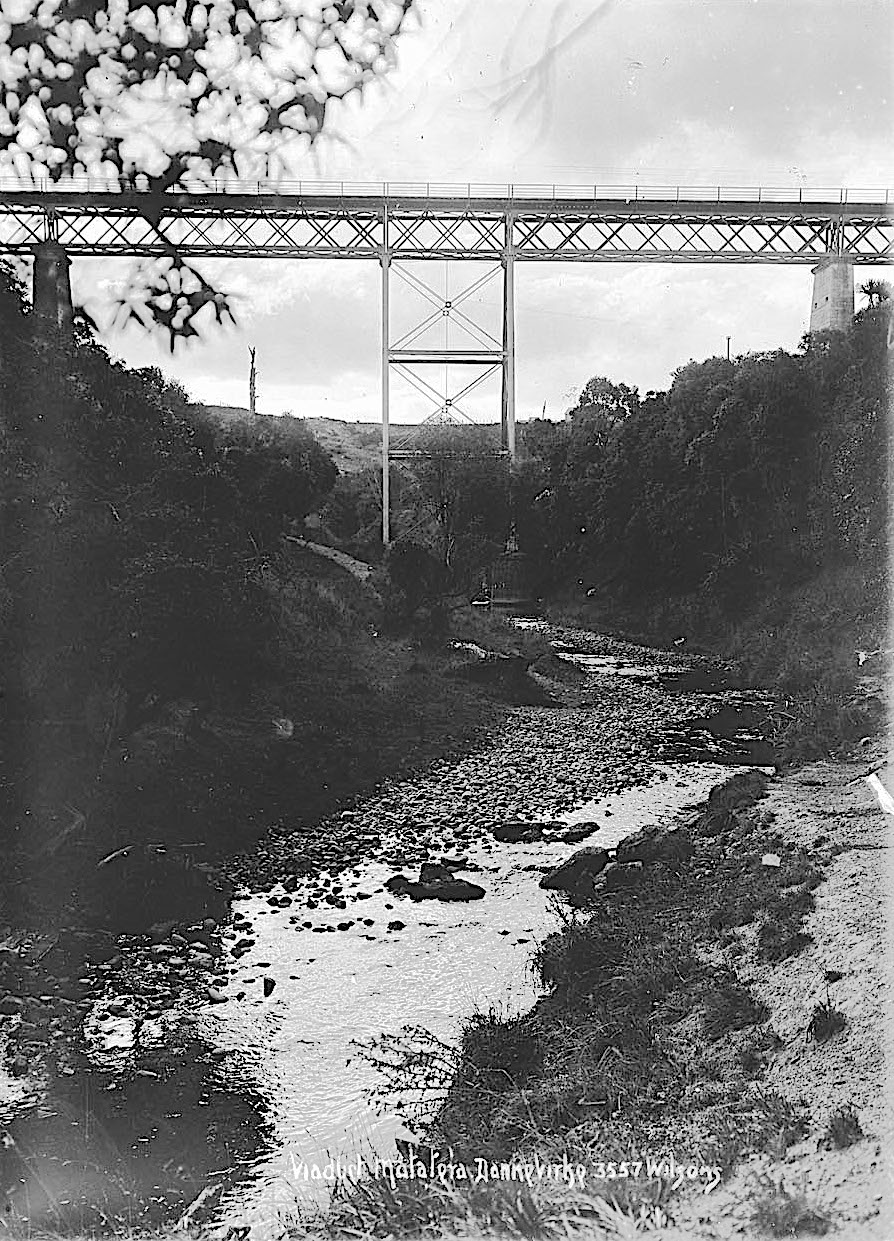
- Piripiri viaduct about 1920
- Coordinates: 40°07′15″S 176°14′00″E
- Crosses: Whakaruatapu Stream
- Owner: KiwiRail

Characteristics
- Design: Plate girder and Pratt truss
- Material: Mild steel
- Total length: 100 metres (330 ft)
- Height: 25 metres (82 ft)
- No. of spans: 4

History
- Engineering design by: PWD
- Constructed by: J. & A. Anderson & Co
- Construction start: 1884
- Construction end: 1884
- Rebuilt: 1900

Location
- Interactive map of Piripiri viaduct

== Demographics ==
Piripiri is in an SA1 statistical area which covers 21.86 km^{2} (8.44 sq mi). The SA1 area is part of the larger Norsewood statistical area.

Historical population
Year	Pop.	±% p.a.
2006	150	—
2013	144	−0.58%
2018	132	−1.73%
2023	132	+0.00%

The SA1 statistical area had a population of 132 in the 2023 New Zealand census, unchanged since the 2018 census, and a decrease of 12 people (−8.3%) since the 2013 census. There were 66 males and 69 females in 51 dwellings. 2.3% of people identified as LGBTIQ+. The median age was 50.7 years (compared with 38.1 years nationally). There were 21 people (15.9%) aged under 15 years, 18 (13.6%) aged 15 to 29, 57 (43.2%) aged 30 to 64, and 36 (27.3%) aged 65 or older.

People could identify as more than one ethnicity. The results were 95.5% European (Pākehā), 11.4% Māori, and 4.5% other, which includes people giving their ethnicity as "New Zealander". English was spoken by 95.5%, Māori language by 2.3%, and other languages by 2.3%. No language could be spoken by 4.5% (e.g. too young to talk). New Zealand Sign Language was known by 2.3%. The percentage of people born overseas was 4.5, compared with 28.8% nationally.

Religious affiliations were 36.4% Christian. People who answered that they had no religion were 56.8%, and 4.5% of people did not answer the census question.

Of those at least 15 years old, 3 (2.7%) people had a bachelor's or higher degree, 72 (64.9%) had a post-high school certificate or diploma, and 33 (29.7%) people exclusively held high school qualifications. The median income was $44,700, compared with $41,500 nationally. 15 people (13.5%) earned over $100,000 compared to 12.1% nationally. The employment status of those at least 15 was that 60 (54.1%) people were employed full-time, 18 (16.2%) were part-time, and 3 (2.7%) were unemployed.

== Piripiri Viaduct ==
Piripiri Viaduct, over the Whakaruatapu Stream (a tributary of the Manawatū River), is 95 m (312 ft) long and up to 29 m (95 ft) high. It is now Bridge 146, a short distance east of Piripiri station.

An 1882 contract gave the job of building Piripiri and Mangatera viaducts to M McKenzie of Dunedin for £9,350. It was built with totara.

J & A Anderson & Co of Christchurch won a tender for a steel and concrete replacement. It was rebuilt in 1899-1900, 10 ft (3.0 m) higher than the original bridge. The new Piri Piri Viaduct was tested under the weight of five locomotives in December 1900 and put to use on 31 January 1901. In the same era Andersons also rebuilt Kopua (1895), Makotuku (1898), Mangatera (1900), Ormondville (1906) and Makatote (1908) viaducts. There was a fire on the bridge on 29 October 1933. Underpinning with reinforced concrete beams was tendered for in 1969.
