= Makotuku =

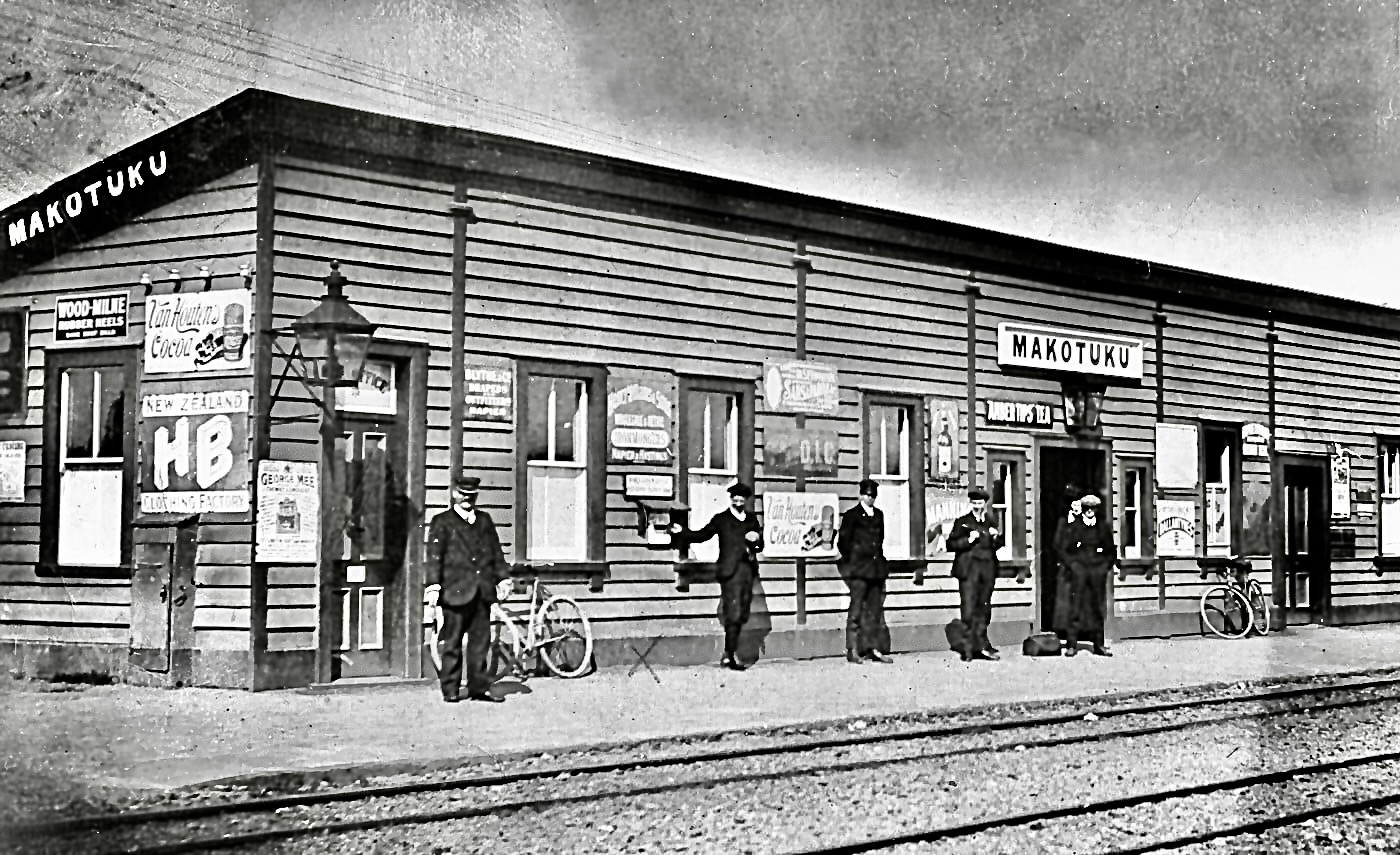
- Makotuku before the verandah was added in 1911
- Interactive map of Makotuku
- Coordinates: 40°07′15″S 176°14′00″E
- Country: New Zealand
- Region: Manawatū-Whanganui
- Territorial authority: Tararua District
- Ward: North Tararua Ward

Government
  - Tararua Mayor: Scott Gilmore
  - Wairarapa MP: Mike Butterick
  - Ikaroa-Rāwhiti MP: Cushla Tangaere-Manuel

Area
  - Total: 27.08 km^{2} (10.46 sq mi)
- Elevation: 292 m (958 ft)

Population (2023 census)
  - Total: 192
  - Density: 7.09/km^{2} (18.4/sq mi)
- Time zone: UTC+12 (NZST)
  - Summer (DST): UTC+13 (NZDT)
- Postcode: 4977

Makotuku is a locality in the Manawatū-Whanganui Region of New Zealand's North Island, about 3 km^{2} (1.2 sq mi) west of Ormondville.

The settlement formed around the temporary railway terminus and was often called Makotoko. Makotuku probably refers to the place of the heron, or kōtuku.

Makotuku School opened in 1881. By 1885 it had about 100 pupils. It closed in 1977.

In 1881 the Beaconsfield Hotel was moved from Kopua to a site next to the station. In 1888 it was replaced by a new hotel and the old one replaced the village hall. The new hotel burnt down in 1912. Makotuku Hotel was built in 1887. It was burnt down in 1933 and its owner was imprisoned for insurance fraud.

In 1886 bush fires caused a relief fund to be set up for those who had lost their homes.

An Anglican Church was built in 1890 and rebuilt after an 1898 fire. St Martins was moved to Linton Camp in 1974.

== Demographics ==
Makotuku locality covers 27.08 km^{2} (10.46 sq mi). It is part of the larger Norsewood statistical area.

Historical population
Year	Pop.	±% p.a.
2006	207	—
2013	180	−1.98%
2018	177	−0.34%
2023	192	+1.64%

Makotuku had a population of 192 in the 2023 New Zealand census, an increase of 15 people (8.5%) since the 2018 census, and an increase of 12 people (6.7%) since the 2013 census. There were 96 males and 93 females in 81 dwellings. 3.1% of people identified as LGBTIQ+. The median age was 54.9 years (compared with 38.1 years nationally). There were 24 people (12.5%) aged under 15 years, 21 (10.9%) aged 15 to 29, 102 (53.1%) aged 30 to 64, and 42 (21.9%) aged 65 or older.

People could identify as more than one ethnicity. The results were 95.3% European (Pākehā); 10.9% Māori; 3.1% Pasifika; 3.1% Asian; 1.6% Middle Eastern, Latin American and African New Zealanders (MELAA); and 3.1% other, which includes people giving their ethnicity as "New Zealander". English was spoken by 96.9%, Māori by 1.6%, and other languages by 3.1%. No language could be spoken by 1.6% (e.g. too young to talk). New Zealand Sign Language was known by 1.6%. The percentage of people born overseas was 9.4, compared with 28.8% nationally.

Religious affiliations were 25.0% Christian, and 3.1% New Age. People who answered that they had no religion were 64.1%, and 7.8% of people did not answer the census question.

Of those at least 15 years old, 9 (5.4%) people had a bachelor's or higher degree, 96 (57.1%) had a post-high school certificate or diploma, and 66 (39.3%) people exclusively held high school qualifications. The median income was $27,000, compared with $41,500 nationally. 12 people (7.1%) earned over $100,000 compared to 12.1% nationally. The employment status of those at least 15 was 69 (41.1%) full-time, 30 (17.9%) part-time, and 9 (5.4%) unemployed.

== Makotuku railway station ==
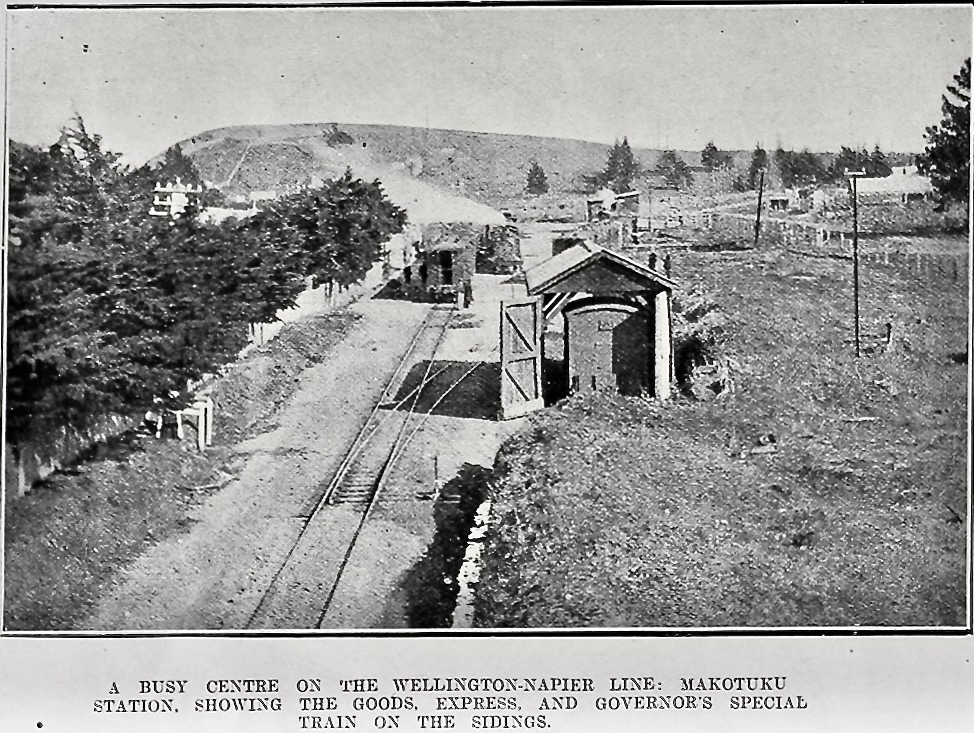
Makotuku railway station 1908

Makotuku railway station was on the Palmerston North–Gisborne Line. Slow progress with the line from Napier and Spit was criticised, after the 5 mi 22 ch (8.5 km) extension of line opened from Kopua (the previous temporary terminus) via Ormondville on 9 August 1880. Makotuku remained the terminus until the 4 mi 22 ch (6.9 km) extension south to Matamau on 23 June 1884, which required construction of what is now the 111 m (364 ft) long and 30 m (98 ft) high Matamau Viaduct. In 1884 Makotuku had two trains a day, one of which continued south to Matamau. Various sawmillers used the railway, including Grey & Powers, Mr Gundrie, Mr Tower, Mathew & Co and F Sidney.

Initially the station would have been very spartan, as it wasn't until 25 August 1880 that authority was sought for furnishing the station and until 28 October to move Kopua goods shed to Makotuku and install a water supply. In 1881 a 5th class stationmaster's house, coal shed, and privy were added. From 1882 to 1918 there was a Post Office at the station. By 1884 there was an engine shed, but later that year there was a complaint when the goods shed was removed from Makotuku. By 1889 there was a 30 ft (9.1 m) x 15 ft (4.6 m) goods shed (extended to 43 ft (13 m) by 1904). Stockyards were added in 1893 and by 1896 there was a 5th class station with luggage room, platform, cart approach, cattle yards, stationmaster's house, urinals, passing loop for 35 wagons, extended to 80 wagons in 1940. In 1898 sheep yards were added. In 1891 express trains started crossing at Makotuku. In 1904 the passing loop could take 34 wagons, extended in 1940 for 80 wagons. Railway housing was mentioned in reports in 1896 and 1937. A verandah was added to the station building in 1911 and the platform was asphalted.

In 1965 it was noted there was one light on the platform and one over the stockyards. In 1968 the crossing loop was lifted. Passenger services ended on 31 May 1976 and goods on Sunday, 20 July 1980. By 1988 a small station building remained, but the platform had recently been demolished. In 2015 the loading bank remained and a single track runs through the station site.

	Former adjoining stations	
Matamau; Line open, station closed 6.75 km (4.19 mi)	Palmerston North–Gisborne Line	Ormondville; Line open, station closed 2.95 km (1.83 mi)

=== Smith's Siding ===
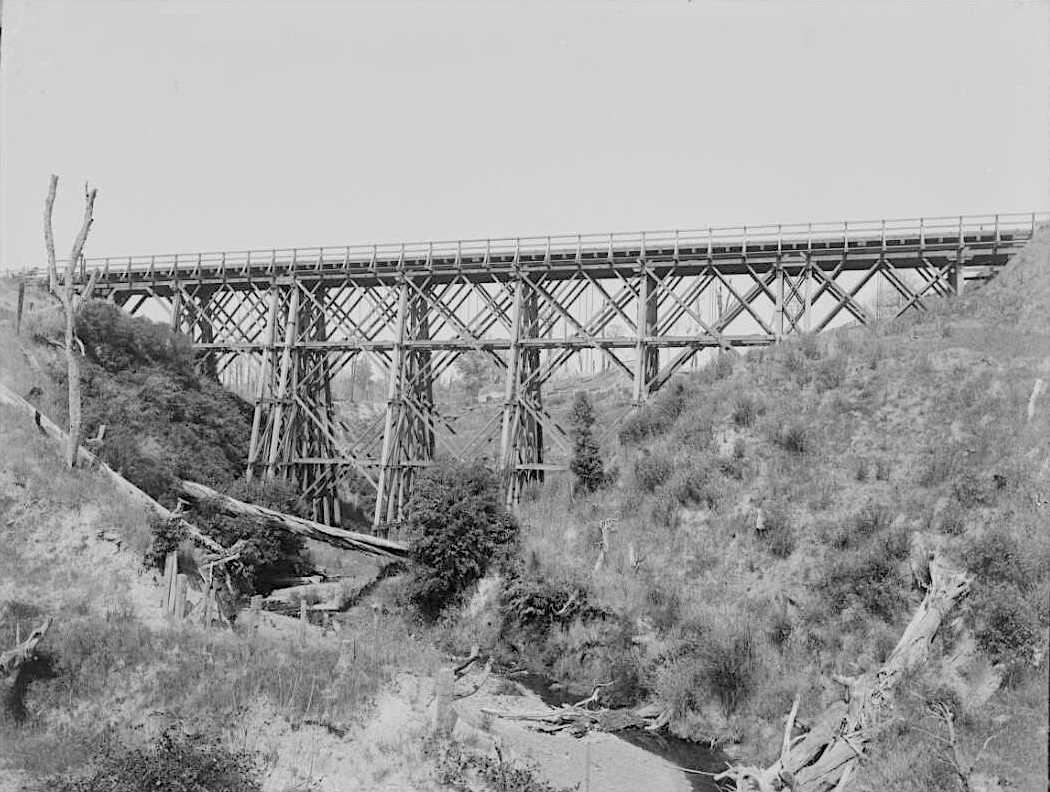
Makotuku viaduct about 1887

James and Henry Smith were cutting totara at Smith's Siding by 1886, 1 mi 45 ch (2.5 km) south of Makotuku. In 1888 goods for the residents were going there. A new sawmill was built in 1891. Gamman sawmills took over at Smith's Siding in 1893 and one of the family died there in 1901. A loop for 15 wagons was mentioned in 1896 and one for 20 wagons in 1898. H B Timber Co had a mill near the siding in 1896. The siding was still in use in 1906.

In the 1990s a passing loop of over a kilometre was laid on the site of the siding.

=== Makotuku Viaduct ===
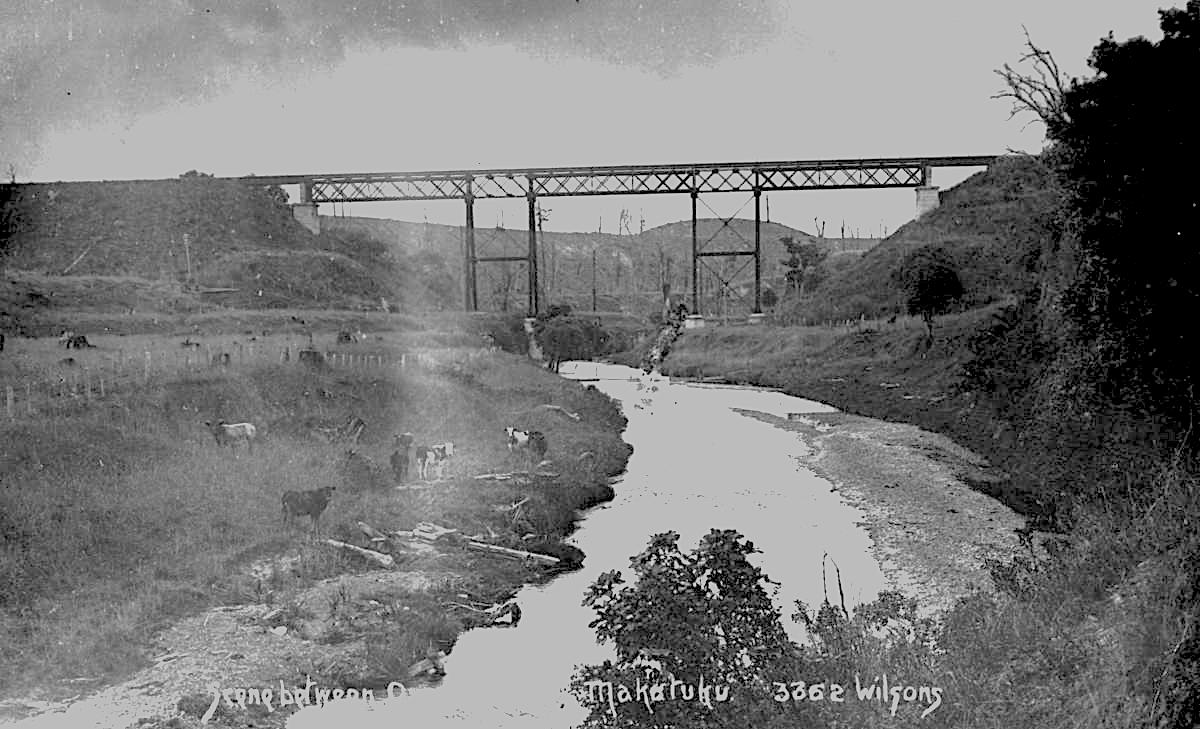
Makotuku Viaduct about 1910

Makotuku Viaduct is east of the station, between Makotuku and Ormondville. There are 6 large viaducts on the 24.57 km (15.27 mi) between Kopua and Dannevirke, including Makotuku Viaduct (bridge 155), which is 128 m (420 ft) long and 26 m (85 ft) high, over Makotuku Stream, a tributary of the Manawatū River.

The original timber (probably totara) truss viaduct was built between 1878 and 1880 by Proudfoot and M'Kay's manager, A Graham. It was 260 ft (79 m) long, 92 ft (28 m) above the stream and used 155,600 ft (47,400 m) of timber, and 6¼ tons of iron, in 7 x 30 ft (9.1 m) spans, 1 x 13 ft (4.0 m), 2 x 11 ft (3.4 m), and 2 x 6 ft (1.8 m). The contract for this and the two bridges to the north was for £16,758, or £15,195 1s 8d.

J & A Anderson & Co of Christchurch won a tender for a wrought iron replacement. It was rebuilt in 1898, 8 ft (2.4 m) higher than the original bridge. In the same era Andersons also rebuilt Kopua (1895), Piripiri (1899), Matamau (1899), Mangatera (1900), Ormondville (1906) and Makatote (1908) viaducts.
