= Matamau =

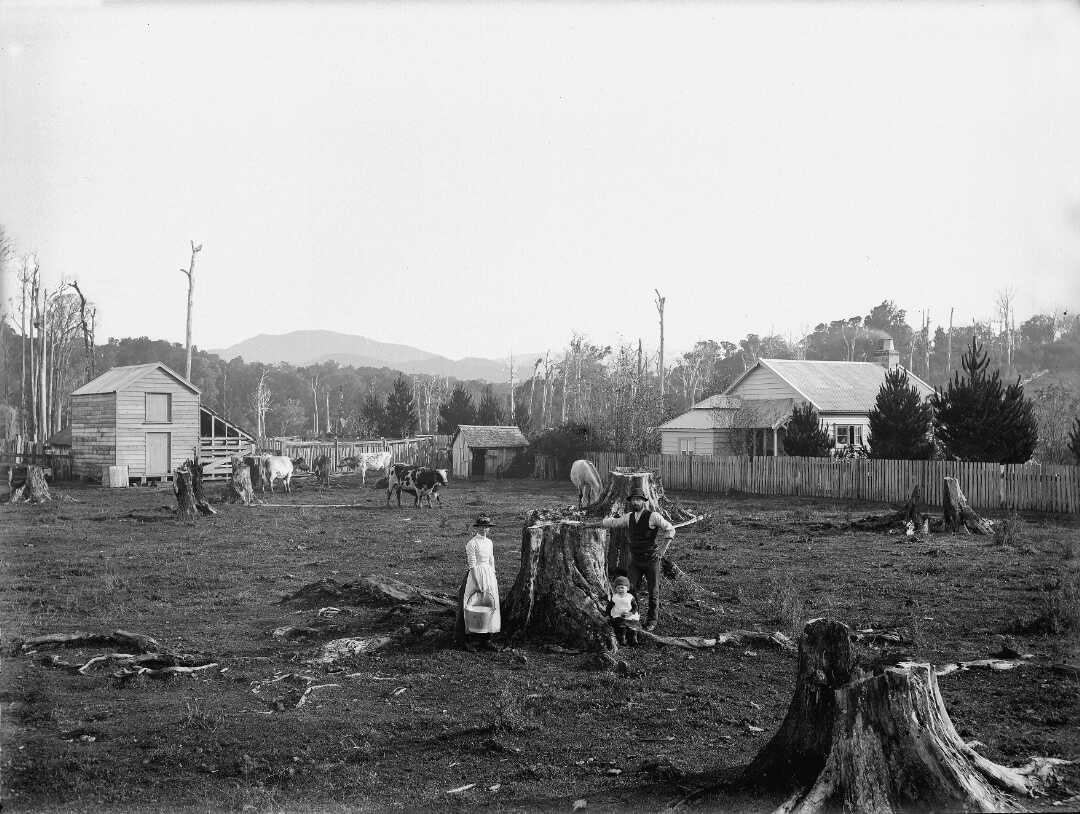
- Matamau and tree stumps in 1880s
- Interactive map of Matamau
- Coordinates: 40.141°S 176.159°E
- Country: New Zealand
- Region: Manawatū-Whanganui
- Territorial authority: Tararua District
- Ward: North Tararua Ward

Government
  - Tararua Mayor: Scott Gilmore
  - Wairarapa MP: Mike Butterick
  - Ikaroa-Rāwhiti MP: Cushla Tangaere-Manuel

Population (2018)
  - Total: 144
- Time zone: UTC+12 (NZST)
  - Summer (DST): UTC+13 (NZDT)
- Postcode: 4977

Matamau is a small village, on a ridge between the Matamau and Whakaruatapu Streams, tributaries of the Manawatū River, in the Manawatū-Whanganui region of New Zealand's North Island. State Highway 2 and the Palmerston North–Gisborne line run through the village. It has a rare surviving example of a basic railway station, a cafe, developed from the former post office and store about 1969, and a truck repair workshop. Until the 1870s it was densely forested, but most of the trees were felled and milled by 1910 and replaced by farms.

== Name ==
The area was initially called by the name of the stream to the north, Whakaruatapu. By 1881 it was called Matamau, which an 1888 newspaper report said was from a Māori legend that a chief tried to spear a kererū at Matamau, but the mata or point of his spear got caught up, mau.

== History ==
Matamau was in the 20,600 acres (8,300 ha) Te Ohu Block, which was part of the 183,430 acres (74,230 ha) Seventy Mile Bush, bought by Government for £17,552 on 16 August 1871, from Hohepa Paewai, a chief of the Rangitāne iwi. Research in 1991 estimated that the Government paid under 2s. per acre and sold for over £1. The first settler came in January 1877 and started to open a clearing in the bush.

Matamau had 3 stores in 1903. It had a creamery from at least 1903, which became a cooperative dairy in 1909 and was still running in 1941. In 1943 there was also another dairy nearby and a church and a hall just north of Pirimau Rd. The hall opened in 1903, on the site of the hotel, and was demolished in 1976. Just to the south a Presbyterian church was built between January and May 1911. It closed in the 1970s. St Michaels and All Angels Anglican church was on the other side of the main road, on O'Kane Rd, from later in 1911 to 1994. Its small bell-tower remains at Weber, where it was moved in 2003.

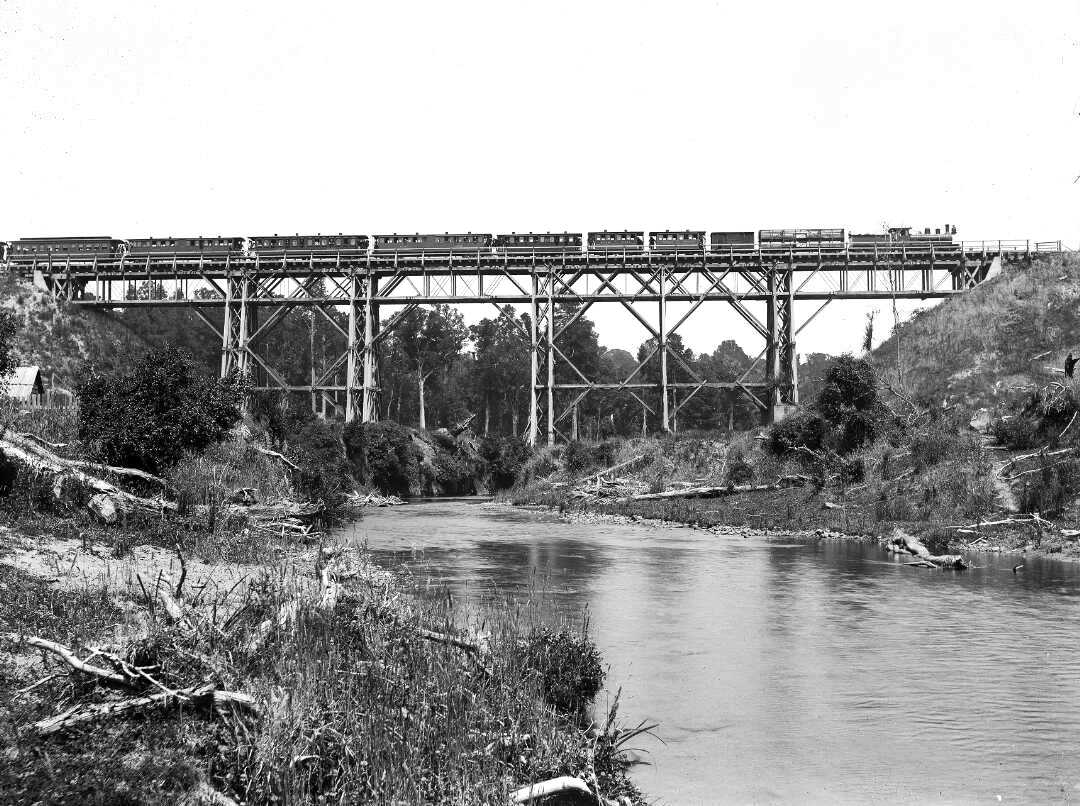
Matamau Viaduct about 1887 with a J class locomotive and train

=== Population ===
By 1886 Matamau had a population of 56, which had increased to 283 by 1916. It had almost halved by the 2018 census to 144 (18 Māori, 117 European) in meshblock 7018799, which covers 63.6 km^{2} (24.6 sq mi) around Matamau. They had a median age of 44.9, rather older than 37.4 nationally. Their median income was $31,700, just below $31,800 nationally.

Matamau railway station
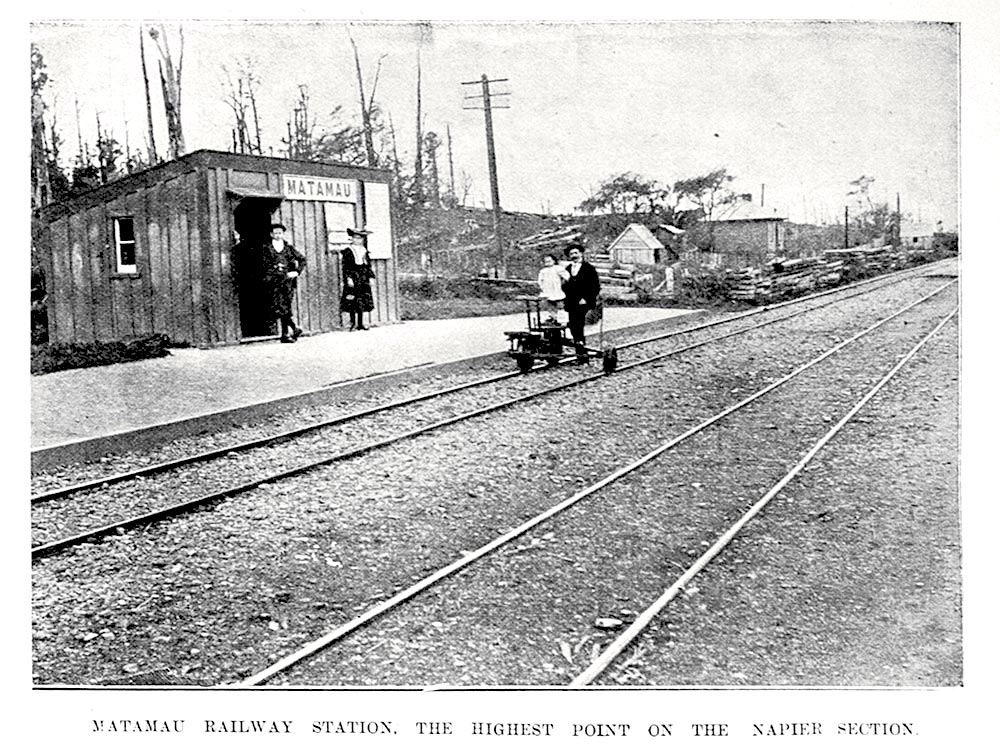
- Matamau in 1904

General information
- Elevation: 309 m (1,014 ft)
- Owner: KiwiRail
- Line: Palmerston North–Gisborne Line
- Distance: Palmerston North 66.1 km (41.1 mi)

History
- Opened: 23 June 1884
- Closed: 27 September 1981

Services
Preceding station	Historical railways	Following station
Piripiri; Line open, station closed 5.3 km (3.3 mi)	Palmerston North–Gisborne Line; KiwiRail	Makotuku; Line open, station closed 6.75 km (4.19 mi)
Location

=== Timber mills ===
J Mortensen leased the bush as far as Piripiri in 1885 and set up a sawmills at Matamau (near the station), Piripiri and Mangatera, in over 11,000 acres (4,500 ha) of the Seventy Mile Bush, to cut totara, mataī, rimu and kahikatea. By 1888 there were sections of 1 to 14 acres (5.7 ha) with 30 to 40 families Mortensen's Piripiri mill was sold in 1895. 1885 Application by K T Mortensen for a private siding at Matamau. Tanner & Mortenson had a siding,, almost 2 miles south of the station, from 1885 for 10 years. 1886 H Smith's application for an extension of his private siding. In 1898 Anderson & Jacobsen's sawmill caught fire. In 1899 Bosher Bros of Feilding put a sawmill on France Rd, in the Te Ohu block, near Matamau, after buying Gamman and Simmond's lease of 1250 acres. 1900 Feilding Sash & Door opened mill. Anderson & Jacobsen and Palmerston North Sash Door & Timber Co had sidings just to the north for 5 years from 1900. Palmerston North Sash & Door Co mill burnt down in 1903.

=== School ===
Matamau School, at the south end of the village, opened on 27 July 1887. Approval to rebuild the school was given in 1936 and it reopened on 27 March 1937. It closed on 29 November 2003, when it merged into Norsewood School.

=== State Highway 2 ===
Before the purchase of Seventy Mile Bush was complete, Government was advertising contracts to clear a 66 ft (20 m) wide strip through it, for what is now SH2, from Takapau to Manawatū Gorge. The road from Piripiri, north to Whakaruatapu was metalled in 1881. It was designated as a Main Highway in 1924. Between 1925 and 1930 the bridge over the Mangatewainui River was sealed, rebuilt in concrete and realigned, at a cost of about 12,000. Sealing along the rest of the road began in 1937. Part of Matamau's cemetery (opened in 1890) was moved in 1957, when the road was realigned through a cutting. The annual average daily traffic count of 1,100 in 1938, rose to 4,967 by 2021.

=== Matamau railway station ===
About a kilometre away, on the other side of the Matamau Stream valley, Matamau railway station opened in 1884 and closed on 27 September 1981. It is a rare surviving example of a small rural station building and the highest station on the Palmerston North-Gisborne Line at 309 m (1,014 ft). The climb to Matamau is on a gradient of 1 in 47. For almost 6 months it was the southern terminus of the 71 mi 58 ch (115.4 km) line from Napier. When completed on 9 Mar 1891, the line extended to Palmerston North, then 40 mi 11 ch (64.6 km) away.

Matamau Hotel opened in October 1881. From February 1885, due to loss of its license, it was moved to Mangatera, opening there in May 1885.

Matamau Post Office opened in 1883, closed in March 1885, and from 1886 to 1909 was at the station, staffed by a ganger.

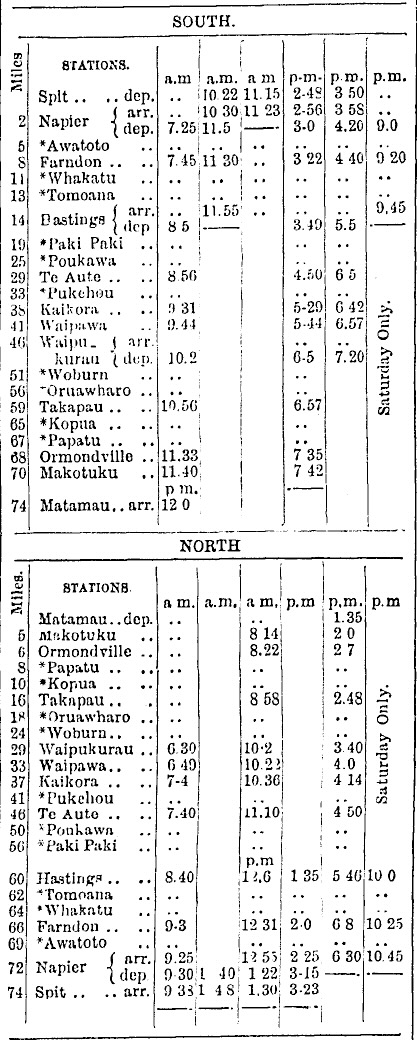
1884 Matamau timetable

Plans for the station were drawn up in 1883 and for an engine shed in 1884. The 1884 shelter shed has a corrugated-iron roof, board-and-batten cladding, and a central entrance. It is one of three Vogel class 7 stations remaining, the others being at Ruru and Otikerama. By 1896 there was also a platform, urinals and a 22 wagon passing loop, extended for 80 wagons in 1940. Later additions were a tablet office, between 1911 and 1914, a ticket office in it in 1915, railway houses in 1920, a loading bank in 1927 and, in 1949, a parcels shed, formerly the Makotuku lamp room.

In 1887 and 1896 trains were derailed by bullocks. A collision between Matamau and Piripiri in 1906 derailed both engines.

On 8 February 1985 a train derailed, causing much damage to the track, after which the station siding was removed.

In 1967, Matamau was converted to a switch-out tablet station and its staff reduced from 3 to one. About 1988 the platform was removed. Ormondville Rail Preservation Group has restored the station. A single track runs by the station.

==== Opening to Matamau ====
By 1879 Kopua and Makatoko viaducts had been completed, except for ballasting and Ormondville Viaduct had been begun. 3 mi (4.8 km) of the line through Matamau was surveyed, ready for felling of the dense bush, and south to Oringi, another 10 mi (16 km) was being surveyed. Beyond Oringi the line was being explored and contoured.

The 4 mi 22 ch (6.9 km) extension south, from Makotuku to Matamau, took 5 years to build. In 1879 the line was surveyed to 7 mi (11 km) south of Kopua. That was followed by bush felling south of Makotuku. Construction stopped shortly after the line reached Makotuku, in August 1880, due to the depression. Work resumed in late 1881, but there were deep cuttings and a large viaduct to build. In 1882 a road was cut through the bush to link the railway station to the main road. The final 1 mi 22 ch (2.1 km) to Matamau was divided into 9 contracts in 1883 to allow local settlers to tender for the work of forming the railway. In February 1884, after a public meeting protested at the slow progress, the Minister of Public Works promised the local MP, William Cowper Smith, that a daily train would run to Matamau, as soon as the tracks and station were built, which was on Monday, 23 June 1884, though it wasn't taken over by the Railways Department until Tuesday, 9 September 1884.

==== Extension south ====
On 8 June 1883 Jay and Haynes took on a £13,615 contract to build the 8 1/4 mi (13.3 km) extension south from Matamau to Tahoraite (or Tahoraiti, later renamed Tapuata). When they went bankrupt, the work was taken on by the Public Works Department. On 1 December 1884 the 7 mi 43 ch (12.1 km) Matamau to Tahoraiti section opened for traffic and Matamau was no longer the southern terminus of the line. However, it wasn't until 16 December that the line was opened with a special excursion train.

Matamau viaduct
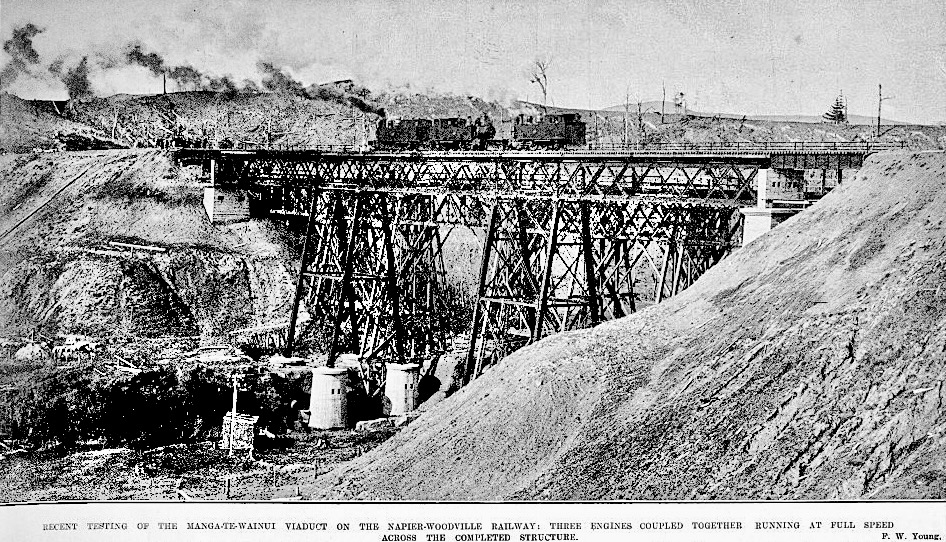
- In 1910 the new steel viaduct was being tested by 3 locomotives at speed. The old, lower, timber viaduct is behind
- Coordinates: 40°08′31″S 176°09′32″E
- Crosses: Mangatewainui River
- Other name: Mangatewainui viaduct
- Owner: KiwiRail

Characteristics
- Material: Steel
- Total length: 111 metres (364 ft)
- Height: 30 metres (98 ft)
- No. of spans: 7

History
- Constructed by: Massey Bros
- Built: 1884
- Rebuilt: 1910

Location
- Interactive map of Matamau viaduct

==== Matamau Viaduct ====
There are 6 large viaducts on the 24.57 km (15.27 mi) between Kopua and Dannevirke, including Matamau Viaduct. Mangatewainui, Mangate Wainui, or Matamau Viaduct, over the Mangatewainui River, is 111 m (364 ft) long and up to 30 m (98 ft) high. It is now Bridge 151, about 3 km (1.9 mi) east of Matamau station. The original timber viaduct cost about £8,000 and 3 workers died during its construction.

Massey Bros (Auckland engineers from 1901 to 1913 and sons of an engineer) won a £5,692 contract for the steelwork for a replacement viaduct in 1908. Under the management of M Forsyth, the work was completed in July 1910.

==== Te Ohu ====
Te Ohu, 62 ch (1.2 km) east of Matamau, had a 13-wagon siding for the Sash & Door Co sawmill. There was a fire at the mill in 1903. Sash & Door built a tramway in 1904. The siding was renamed Te Ohu from 23 May 1905. The siding was reported as taken up in 1911, but that may have been just for reconstruction of the viaduct, as the sawmill's tramway horses weren't sold until 1921.

==== Rakaiatai Siding ====
Rakaiatai Siding was 1 mi 69 ch (3.0 km) east of Te Ohu and 1 mi 45 ch (2.5 km) west of Makotuku. It was used for taking timber out of the bush from about November 1904. It was Scholes & Wright's Siding until 1905. By 1906 it had a loop for 10 wagons, extended to 45 by 1911. On 13 January 1908 the siding, a wagon and Gamman's mill and houses burnt down. Waikopiro Timber Company took over the siding and laid a tramway. Mr Scholes was still using a tramway to the siding in early 1914, but the siding had been taken up by 8 July 1914.
