= Kopua railway station =

Railway station in New Zealand

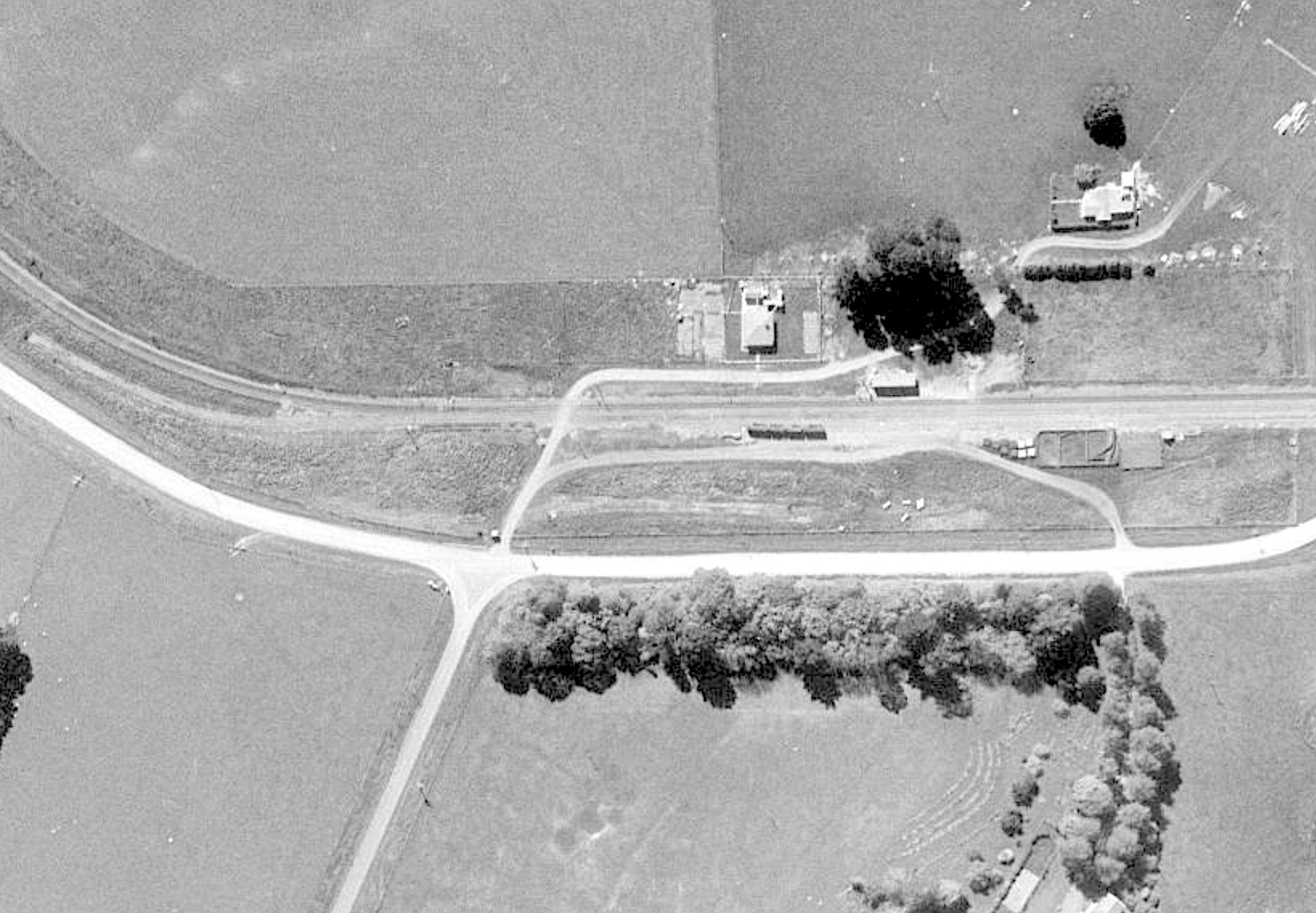
- Kopua in 1966

General information
- Coordinates: 40°05′02″S 176°17′08″E
- Elevation: 297 m (974 ft)
- Owner: KiwiRail
- Line: Palmerston North–Gisborne Line
- Distance: Palmerston North 80.44 km (49.98 mi)

History
- Opened: 25 January 1878
- Closed: 8 May 1977

Services
Preceding station	Historical railways	Following station
Ormondville; Line open, station closed 4.63 km (2.88 mi)	Palmerston North–Gisborne Line; KiwiRail	Takapau; Line open, station closed 9.36 km (5.82 mi)
Location

Kopua in New Zealand is now a sparsely populated area, immediately south of the border of the Manawatū-Whanganui and Hawke's Bay regions, with 150 people (2018 census) scattered over a 40 km^{2} (15 sq mi) meshblock. For two years it briefly flourished as a village, centred on a railway station on the Palmerston North–Gisborne line, opened on 25 January 1878, when it became the southern terminus of the line from Napier and Spit. Building to the south was delayed by the need to erect 3 large viaducts over the Manawatū River and its tributaries, so the extension to Makotuku didn't open until 9 August 1880. Kopua then declined until the station closed on 8 May 1977. Only a single line now passes through the station site and there are remnants of cattle yards.

== History ==
The area was part of the Ngāti Raukawa rohe. In 1877 land was acquired for a railway ballast pit at Kopua. In 1879 Kopua was a clearing of about 1 mi (1.6 km) by ¼ mile in the Seventy Mile bush. Sawmills were set up as soon as the line opened. Wilding & Bull had a mill at Kopua from 1881 to 1884. In 1898 there were skids for loading logs. As the bush was cut out, the mills gradually moved south. Nelson Bros. moved theirs in 1895. From 1898 Gammon & Co had a tramway to the station yard. Their mill left Kopua in 1899. The photo below shows that some bush remained in 1910, but the photo above shows it was gone by 1966.

The 5 mi 60 ch (9.3 km) extension from Takapau opened on 25 January 1878, on track laid by W J Millar. Opening was marked by a public holiday in Napier, when 1,000 passengers filled a 22-coach train to Kopua, which took about 4 hours for the 62 mi 22 ch (100.2 km). In 1877 a 2nd class stationmaster's house was built by Donald McLeod, a Waipukurau carpenter. Next year a cottage was moved from Waipukurau to Kopua, a telegraph office opened, Angus McKay built the station buildings and, in 1879, a temporary engine shed was added. There were soon about 180 living at Kopua. From 1878 to 1884 the engineer's office was at Kopua. From 1880 Kopua had 2 trains a day. It was shown in 1891 as a flag station, still with 2 trains a day. It didn't appear in 1897 adverts.

About 100 navvies were working on the extension south in 1878. Work was delayed by subsidence between Kopua and the Manawatu River, where a deviation was put in to cross solid ground. It had been planned to complete the line to Makotuku by 29 July 1879. It was let out in small contracts to settlers from Norsewood, Dannevirke, Ormondville, and Makaretu. There was no formal opening of the extension south to Makotuku, which was delayed by a couple of days, due to a slip.

The railway sought tenders for a Kopua hotel, which was built in 1878. Trains paused for a 20 minute refreshment break from May 1881 to 21 January 1884, when Kopua became a flag station, though the goods shed was moved to Makotuku in 1880, the Beaconsfield Hotel also to Makotuku in 1881, the magistrates court to Ormondville and Kopua was described as a deserted village in 1881 and even more so in 1887. In 1885 the Resident Engineer's house was moved to Spit for a stationmaster and two platelayers' cottages were moved away.

There was a post office at the station from 1878 to 1883 and from 1926 to 1967. By 1896 there was a shelter shed, platform, urinals and a passing loop for 16 wagons. In 1898 the loop was for 20 wagons and further lengthened in 1911 to 50 and 1940 to 80 wagons. Two loops remained in 1980. Cattle yards were added in 1900 and railway houses in 1905 and 1941.

== Kopua viaduct ==
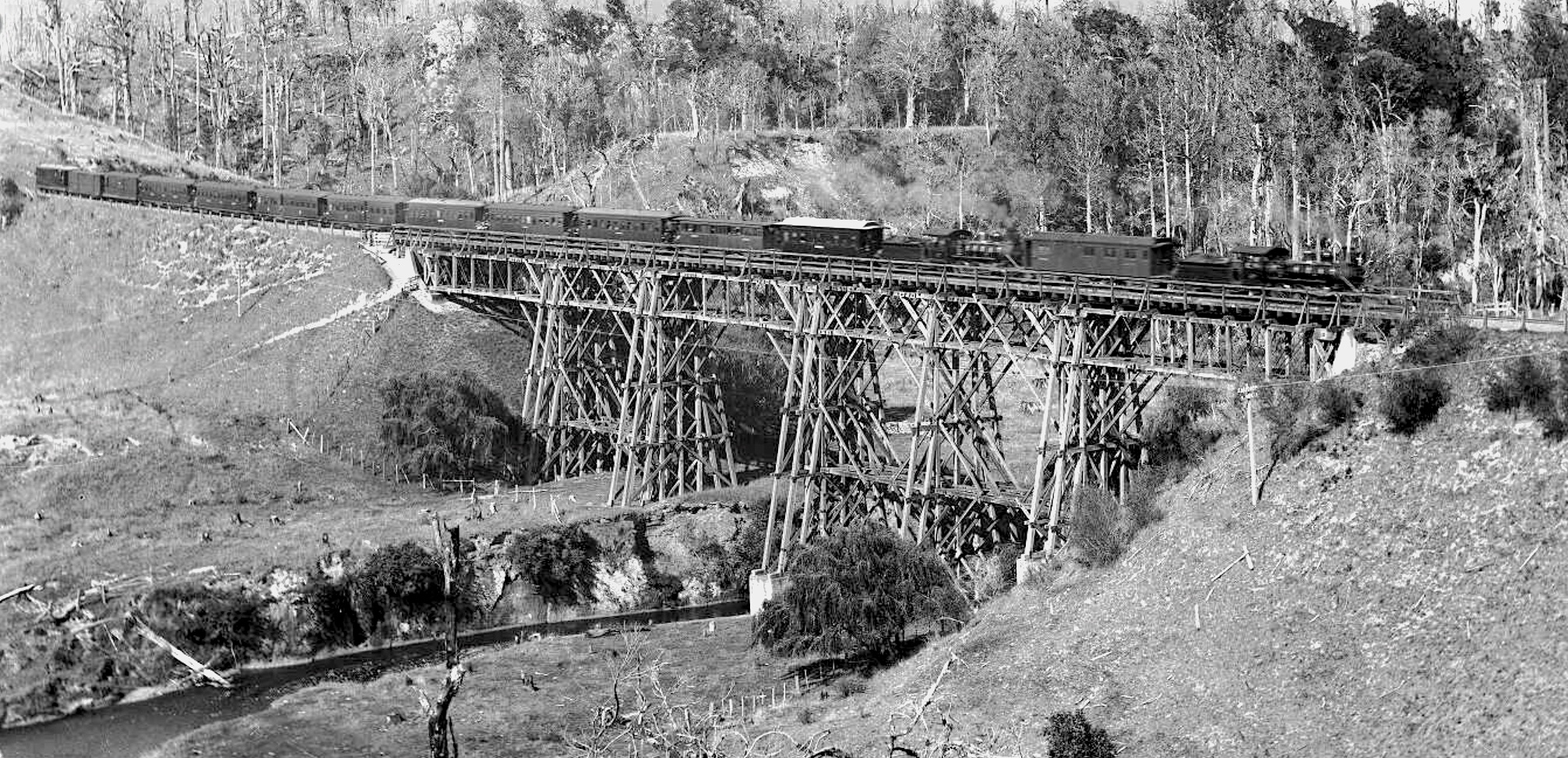
Kopua viaduct about 1910

Kopua Viaduct (bridge 158) is 129 m (423 ft) long and 29 m (95 ft) above the Manawatū, with 4 spans of 60 ft (18 m), 3 of 30 ft (9.1 m), 2 of 33 ft (10 m) and 2 of 13 ft (4.0 m). It dates from 1897. The original timber (probably totara) truss viaduct was built between 1877 and 1879 by A Mackay for £1,139, though another report said the contractors were Proudfoot and Angus Mackay (who built the bridge at Clive and who, in 1892, was the first Mayor of Dannevirke) for 3 bridges costing £15,195 1s 8d, or £16,758. It was 91 ft (28 m) high and 433 ft (132 m) long, in spans of 60 ft (18 m), 12 x 30 ft (9.1 m) and 13 ft (4.0 m). Water tanks were added as a fire precaution in 1881. The old viaduct was demolished in 1898; traces of the old route can be discerned upstream from the present structure.

In 1895 a wrought iron replacement of the viaduct was put out to tender. It was won by J & A Anderson & Co of Christchurch in 1896 for £4,728, though in 1899 the cost was put at £6,684, presumably including the approach banks. In the same era Andersons also rebuilt Makotuku (1898), Matamau (1899), Mangatera (1900), Ormondville (1904) and Makatote (1908) viaducts. Floods and earthquakes created problems with the approach banks, closing the line for about 4 days in 1896. An earthquake was noted as early as 1878. The approach to the viaduct slumped about a foot in the 1904 earthquake and the viaduct was damaged in the 1931 quakes On 12 September one of the piers subsided and on 18 September 1932 some 200 ft (61 m) of the northern approach sank about 20 ft (6.1 m), was closed for repairs for 5 days and then a washout occurred about a month later, after a new approach had been built. The bank approaching the viaduct also subsided slightly in a 1934 quake. During another earthquake in 1938, a train was crossing, but the viaduct was undamaged. Pier 5 was underpinned in 1983.

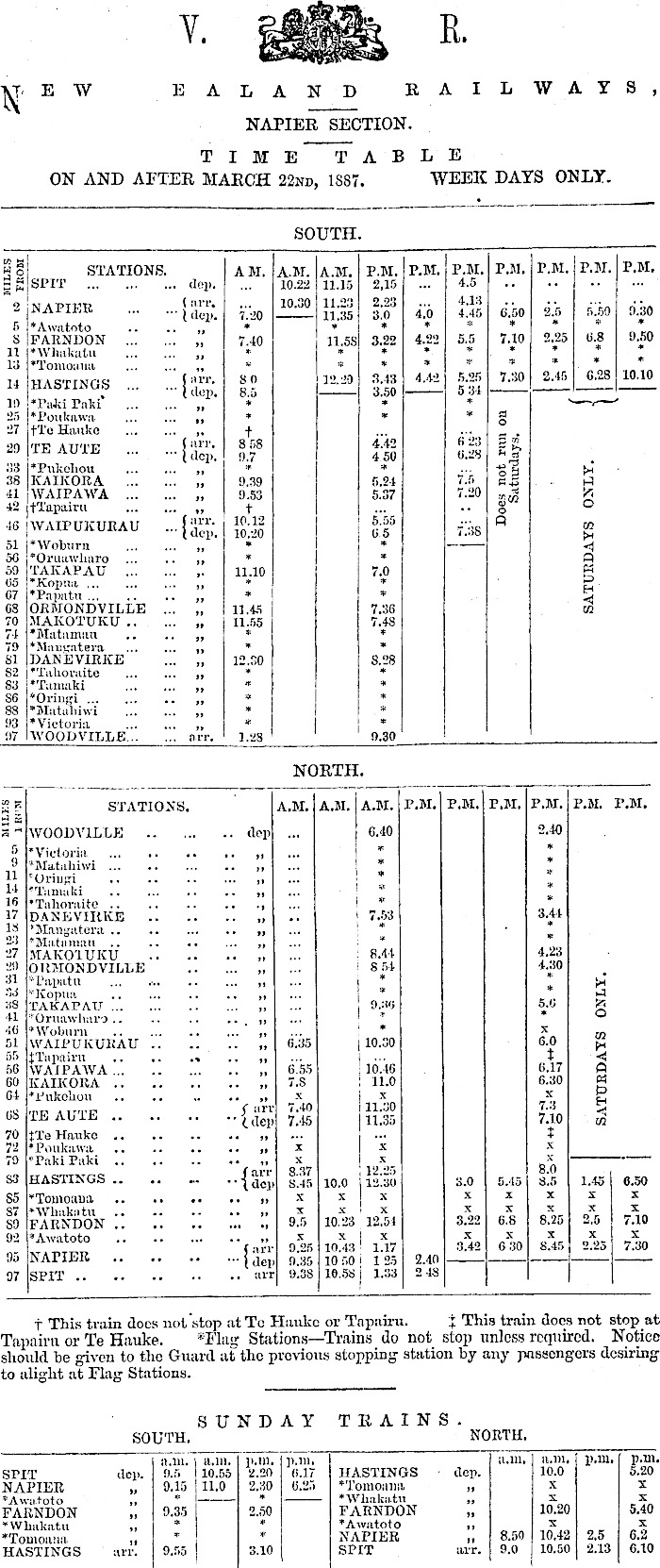
22 March 1887 timetable showing Kopua and Papatu as flag stations

== Whenuahou railway station ==
Whenuahou flag station was 1 mi 19 ch (2.0 km) north of Kopua and 4 mi 42 ch (7.3 km) south of Takapau. There was a siding at Whenuahou by 1890. In 1887 a train had to be split in two, as the gradient between Takapau and Ormondville was too much for the engine to take the whole train. The station may have been used to provide for such splitting of trains. By 1905 it had a passing loop for 22 wagons and by 1911 a shelter shed and platform had been added. On 8 November 1908 Otawhao was renamed Whenuahou. In 1917 the mail train was noted as not stopping at Kopua, or Whenuahou. From 4 March 1947 the loop was no longer in regular use. On 23 January 1957 Whenuahou closed to all traffic and by 29 October 1957 the siding and main line points had been removed. There is now only a single track through the station site.

== Papatu railway station ==
Papatu flag station was 1 mi 69 ch (3.0 km) south of Kopua and 1 mi 43 ch (2.5 km) north of Ormondville (the line was longer before the viaduct was rebuilt). A private siding was granted in 1878 to H R Russell's Kopua Saw-mills, 1 mi 76 ch (3.1 km) south of Kopua. It was used by Wilding & Bull until 1884, when it was taken up. The mill had been damaged by fire in 1880, their bush was burnt in 1881 and their mill in 1893. A meeting in 1880 asked for a public siding. Ormondville steam saw mills had a siding at Papatu where they cut totara, rimu, mataī and kahiktea from 1881. A tramway to Firth's sawmill was approved in 1881 and extension of Papatu siding in 1883. On 20 June 1884 Papatu became a flag station. There was a protest when it was shut on 14 May 1890 and it was proposed to remove the shelter shed and platform. In 1894 an application for trains to stop at Papatu station for passengers, which was followed by a deputation in 1895. By 1896 there was a passing loop for 21 wagons. However, in 1897 it was noted there was no accommodation and in 1898 the points were lifted. Later that year Gammon & Co considered loading timber there, but found the road connection too difficult, so instead asked for a tramway to Kopua. A decade later, in 1908, road access to the siding was improved, but in 1913 it was closed and removed. There is now just a single track through the station site at the 75 km post.

== Climate ==
Climate data for Kopua (1991–2020)
Month	Jan	Feb	Mar	Apr	May	Jun	Jul	Aug	Sep	Oct	Nov	Dec	Year
Mean daily maximum °C (°F)	22.6 (72.7)	22.5 (72.5)	20.6 (69.1)	17.6 (63.7)	15.0 (59.0)	12.4 (54.3)	11.6 (52.9)	12.5 (54.5)	14.5 (58.1)	16.6 (61.9)	18.1 (64.6)	20.7 (69.3)	17.1 (62.7)
Daily mean °C (°F)	17.2 (63.0)	17.3 (63.1)	15.2 (59.4)	12.9 (55.2)	10.6 (51.1)	8.3 (46.9)	7.7 (45.9)	8.4 (47.1)	10.1 (50.2)	11.9 (53.4)	13.3 (55.9)	15.7 (60.3)	12.4 (54.3)
Mean daily minimum °C (°F)	11.8 (53.2)	12.1 (53.8)	10.3 (50.5)	8.1 (46.6)	6.3 (43.3)	4.3 (39.7)	3.8 (38.8)	4.2 (39.6)	5.6 (42.1)	7.3 (45.1)	8.5 (47.3)	10.8 (51.4)	7.8 (46.0)
Average rainfall mm (inches)	74.7 (2.94)	76.3 (3.00)	74.4 (2.93)	73.2 (2.88)	81.1 (3.19)	97.8 (3.85)	116.2 (4.57)	87.0 (3.43)	85.5 (3.37)	90.1 (3.55)	72.1 (2.84)	76.1 (3.00)	1,004.5 (39.55)
Source: NIWA (rainfall 1981–2010)

== See also ==
Southern Star Abbey to the west of the railway
