= Druce =

Druce is a surname. Notable people with the surname include:

- Duncan Druce (1939–2015), British composer and musicologist
- Eliot Druce (1876–1934), English cricketer
- Frank Druce (1875–1954), English cricketer
- George Claridge Druce (1850–1932), British botanist
- Hamilton Herbert Druce (1869–1922), British entomologist, son of the above
- Helen Margaret Druce (1921–2010), New Zealand teacher, tramper, botanist and botanical collector
- Herbert Druce (1846–1913), British entomologist
- John Druce (born 1966), Canadian ice hockey player
- Joseph Druce (born 1965), American prisoner who murdered John Geoghan
- Olga Druce, American radio and television producer, public speaker, and actress
- Thomas W. Druce (born 1961), former member of the Pennsylvania House of Representatives
- Anthony Peter "Tony" Druce (1920-1999), New Zealand tramper, botanist, and botanical collector
