= Ormondville =

Settlement in Manawatū-Whanganui Region, New Zealand

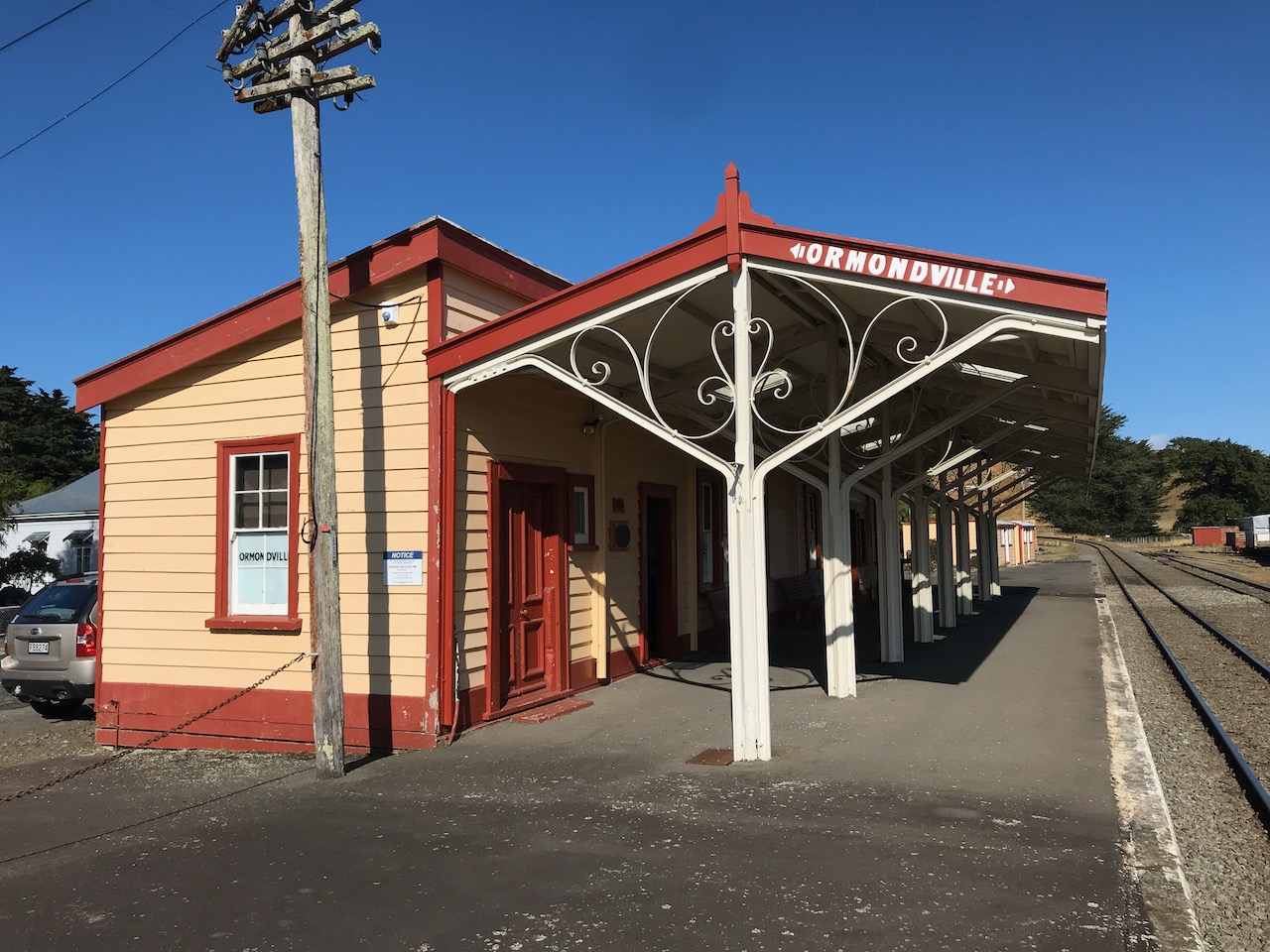
- Railway station
- Interactive map of Ormondville
- Coordinates: 40.111°S 176.264°E
- Country: New Zealand
- Region: Manawatū-Whanganui
- Territorial authority: Tararua District
- Wards: North Tararua General Ward; Tamaki nui-a Rua Maori Ward
- Community: Dannevirke Community
- Electorates: Wairarapa; Ikaroa-Rāwhiti (Māori)

Government
  - Type: Territorial Authority
  - Body: Tararua District Council
  - Tararua Mayor: Scott Gilmore
  - Wairarapa MP: Mike Butterick
  - Ikaroa-Rāwhiti MP: Cushla Tangaere-Manuel
  - Regional council: Horizons Regional Council

Area
  - Total: 0.29 km^{2} (0.11 sq mi)
- Elevation: 301 m (988 ft)

Population (June 2025)
  - Total: 90
  - Density: 310/km^{2} (800/sq mi)
- Time zone: UTC+12 (NZST)
  - Summer (DST): UTC+13 (NZDT)
- Postcode: 4977

Ormondville is a locality in the Manawatū-Whanganui region of New Zealand's North Island. It is located inland, south of Waipukurau and west of Flemington, Hawke's Bay.

Ormondville railway station opened in 1880, but services ended in 2001.

Ormondville buildings

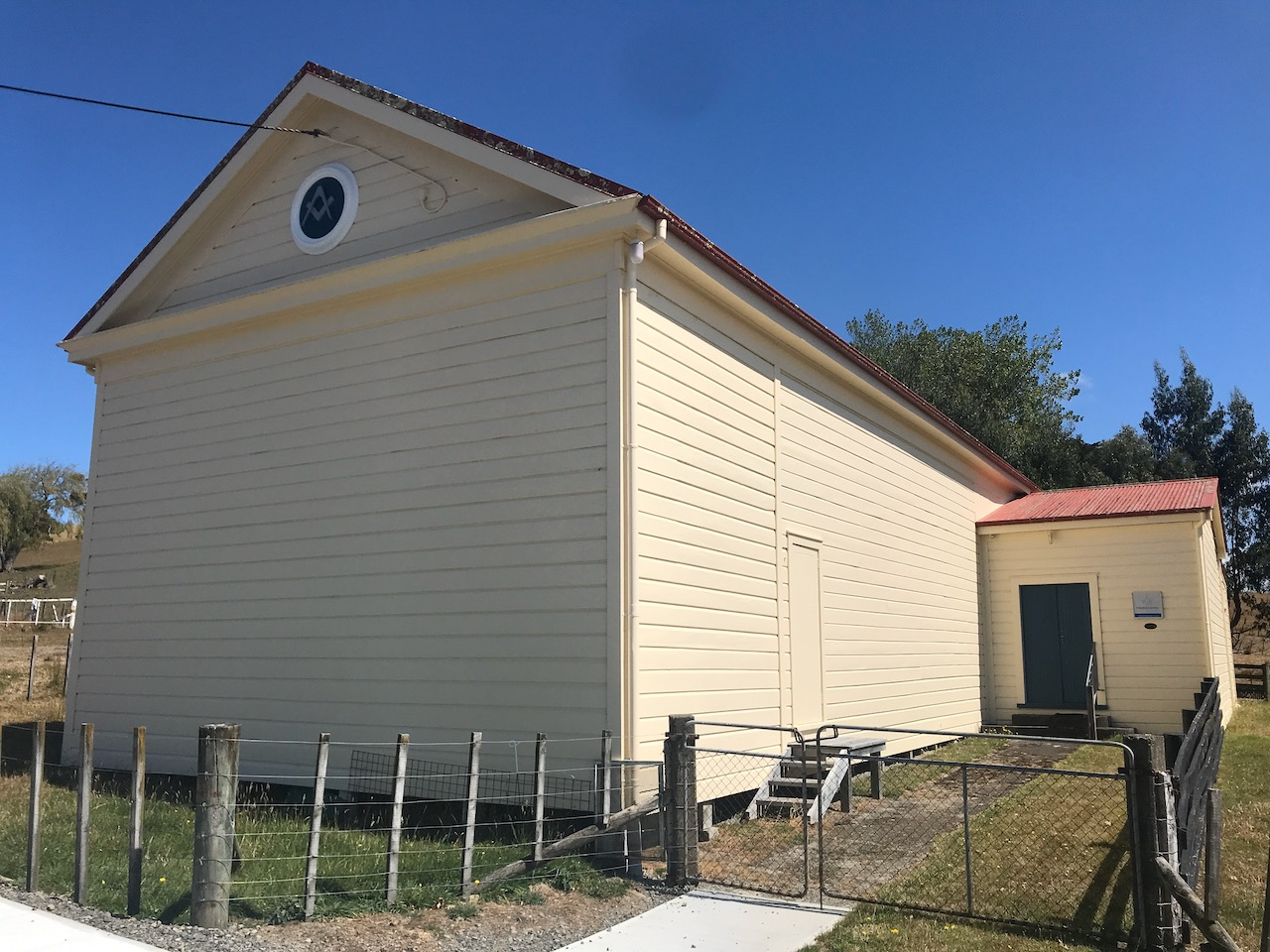
Masonic Lodge

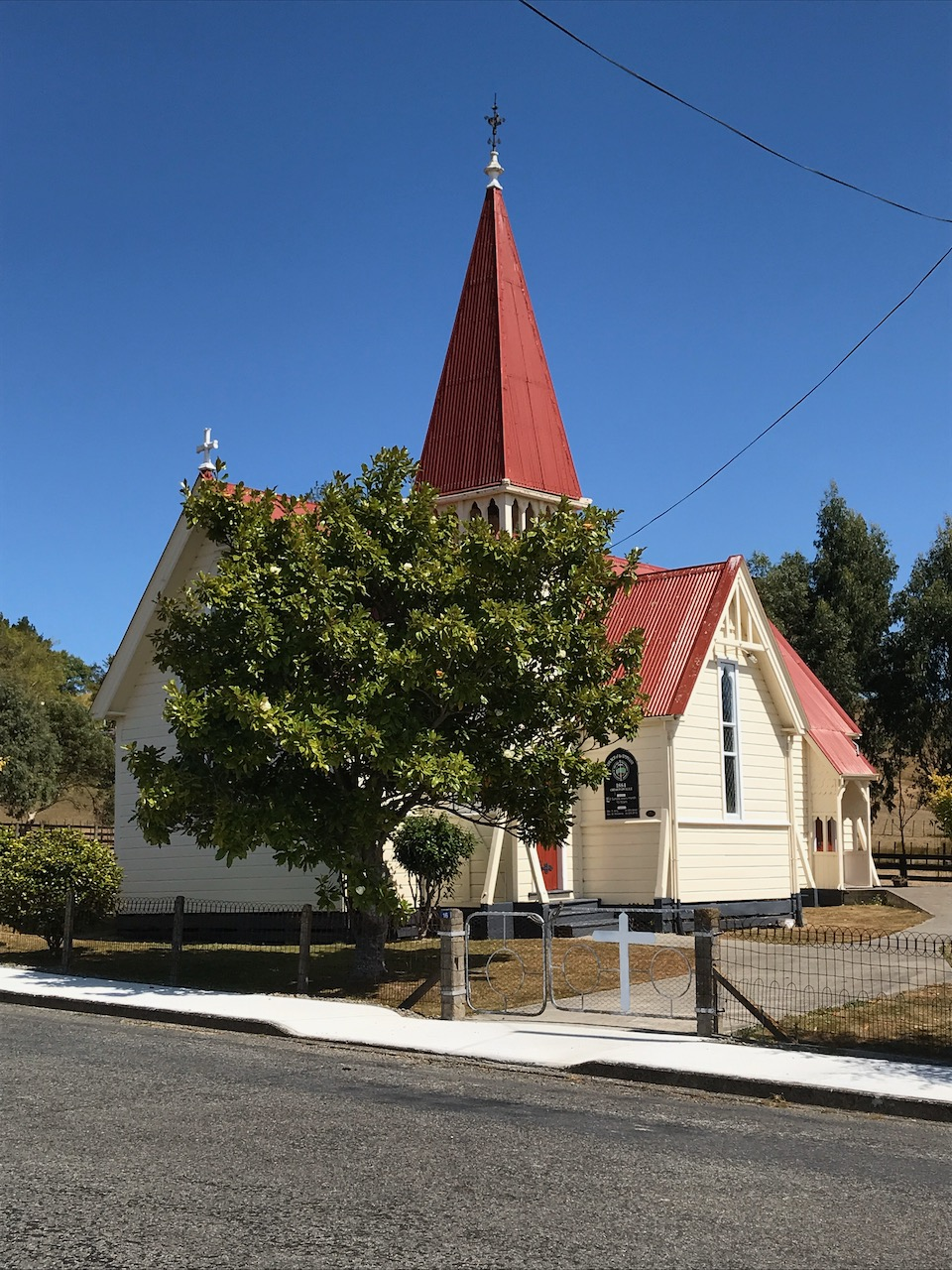
Anglican Church of Epiphany

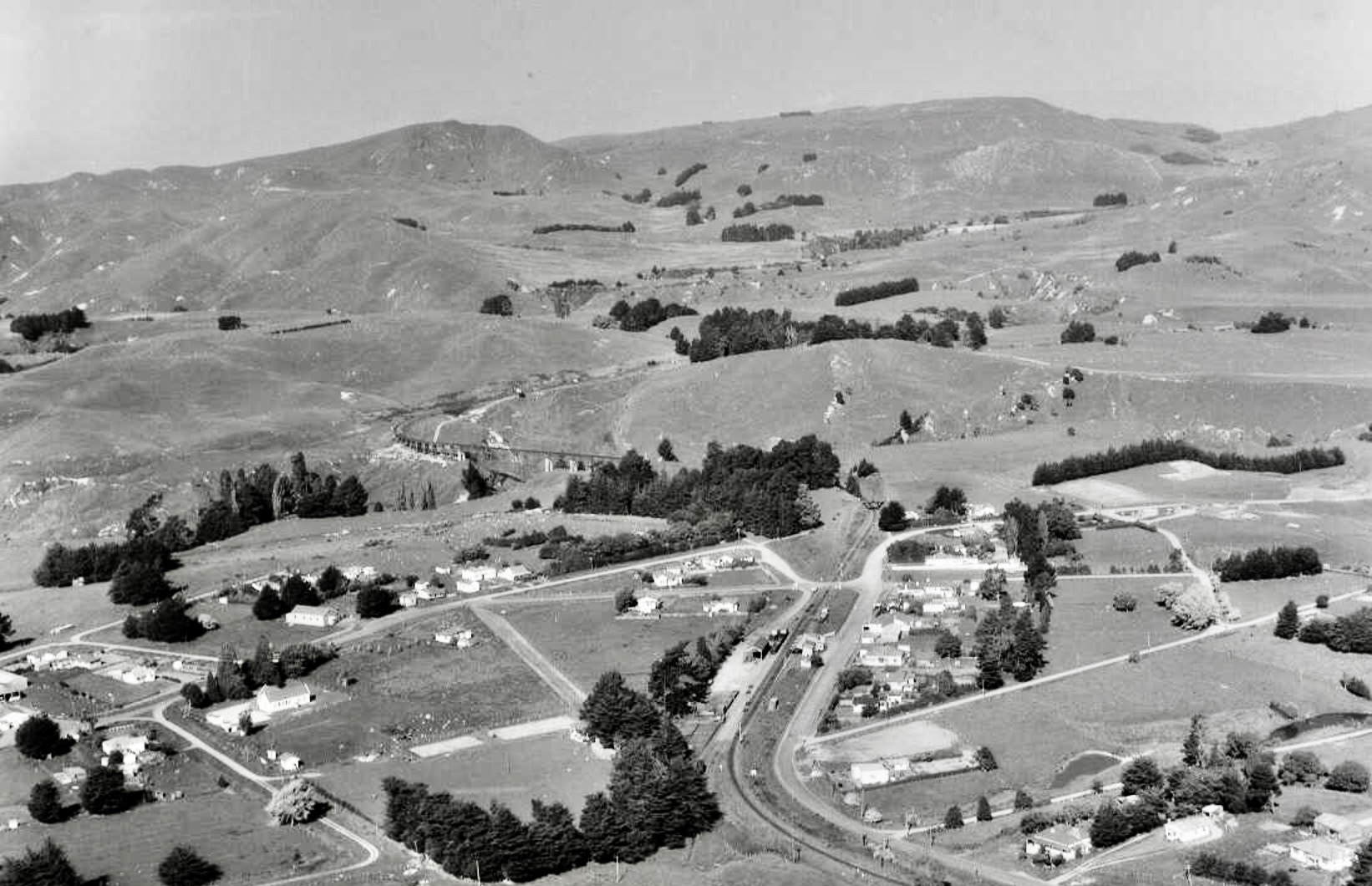
Ormondville in 1958

== History ==
Ormondville was in the 8,230 acres (3,330 ha) Tuatua Block, which was part of the 183,430 acres (74,230 ha) Seventy Mile Bush area, bought by government for £17,552 on 16 August 1871, from Hohepa Paewai, a chief of the Rangitāne iwi. The area was then sold to settlers by the Waste Lands Board, through a Special Settlement Scheme. Ormondville was named after John Davies Ormond, who was then the local MP and Superintendent of Hawke's Bay Province. Ormondville used to be much larger; in 1901 the population was 459. It once had a court-house (1881-1932), Alpha dairy factory (1899-1931), hotel, cobbler, garage, butchery, blacksmith, saddler, undertaker, solicitor, library, draper, billiard room, 3 stores, police station, school, an Anglican and a Catholic church, library, hall, bakery, sports ground and railway station. It had a Town Board (including the Makotuku Riding) from 1885 until 1944, when it merged into Dannevirke County Council, following a petition. A hydro electric plant was installed at nearby Cave Farm in 1906, but power wasn't connected to Ormondville until the late 1920s.

=== Ormondville railway station ===
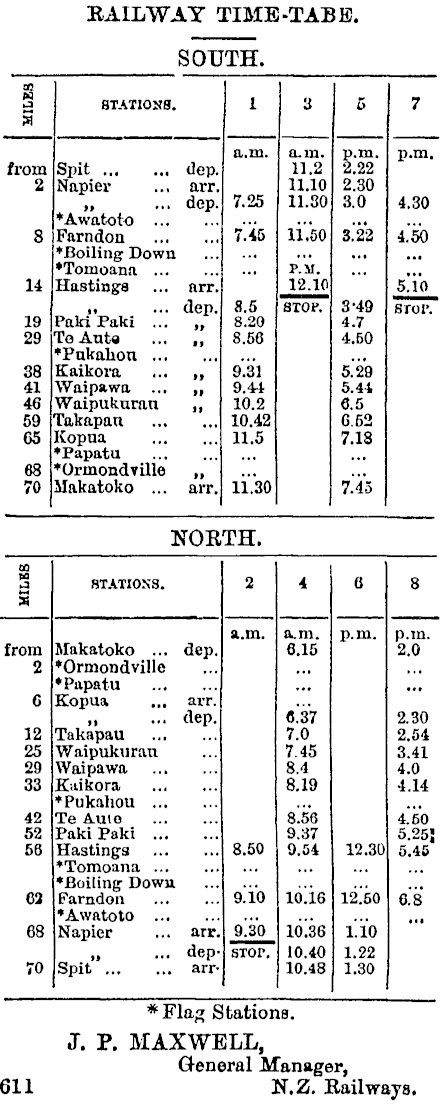
In 1882 trains were flagged down at Ormondville, but not at Kopua

Ormondville railway station, on the Palmerston North–Gisborne line, opened on 9 August 1880, closed to goods on 31 August 1985 and the last regular passenger train was the Bay Express on 7 October 2001. The station, goods shed and sidings remain and it has been protected by a Category 2 listing since 7 April 1983. Since 1986 it has been maintained by Ormondville Rail Preservation Group and offers beds for tourists.

In 1878 about 100 navvies were working on the 5 mi 22 ch (8.5 km) Makotuku extension of the line from Napier and Spit to Kopua. The work had been let out in small contracts to settlers from Danevirke, Makaretu, Norsewood and Ormondville. It included 3 large viaducts (Kopua, Ormondville and Makotuku) over the Manawatū River and its tributaries. Work was delayed by subsidence near Kopua; it had been planned to complete the extension by 29 July 1879. There was no formal opening of this section, which was delayed by a couple of days by a slip.

Originally it wasn't clear which of the settlements in the Seventy Mile bush would develop enough to justify a station. In 1878 there was still doubt that Ormondville would have one. A station and water supply were planned in 1879. Initially Ormondville wasn't always shown in timetables, but from 27 June 1881 it became a flag station, with 2 trains a day each way. From April 1882 it was no longer shown as a flag station. It was shown in 1891 still with 2 trains a day. By 1897 it had 3 trains a day. In 1910 it took over 7 hours from Wellington, but by the 1940s the journey was 4 to 5 hours. By 1981 the Endeavour took about 3½ hours, as did the Bay Express.

Initially the station would have been very spartan, as it wasn't until August 1880 that authority was sought for furnishing it and in 1882 there was negotiation over whether Public Works or NZR would pay for a ladies waiting room. There was a post office at the station from 1883 to 1914 and in 1891, when the platform length was doubled, consideration was given to providing refreshment rooms. By 1896 there was a 5th class station (12 ft 9 in (3.89 m) x 32 ft 6 in (9.91 m)), with office and ladies rooms, waiting lobby, platform, cart access, stationmaster's house, a 30 ft (9.1 m) x 20 ft (6.1 m) goods shed (extended to 60 ft (18 m) by 1906), urinals and a passing loop for 14 wagons. In 1898 the loop was for 20 wagons and it was further lengthened in 1925 for 59 wagons. Cattle yards were added in 1898, lit in 1913 and extended in 1908 and 1920. A verandah was added in 1901. Railway houses were added in 1919, 1927 and 1938. By 1926 the platform was 210 ft (64 m) long, with 15 ft (4.6 m) ramps and extended 50 ft (15 m) in 1927. In 1959 a verandah was added to the goods shed to protect dairy goods and the loading bank was extended in 1965.

In the 1880s and 90s there were sawmills with tramways to their mills and the railway. In 1881 Alfred Levy & W W Gundrie applied for a tramway across the road at Ormondville station. Samuel Baines Firth took over one of Gundrie's mills and had a tramway from 1882 to 1884. G Grant applied for a tramway in 1886 and had one hauling timber from before 1889 to 1891.

Ormondville was among the lower traffic stations on the line. For example, in 1923 it sold 8,138 tickets, though it was among the larger stations in its export of 111,168 sheep and pigs. In 1933 there was a bus link to Te Uri, towards the coast.

	Former adjoining stations	
Makotuku; Line open, station closed 2.95 km (1.83 mi)	Palmerston North–Gisborne Line	Kopua; Line open, station closed 4.63 km (2.88 mi)

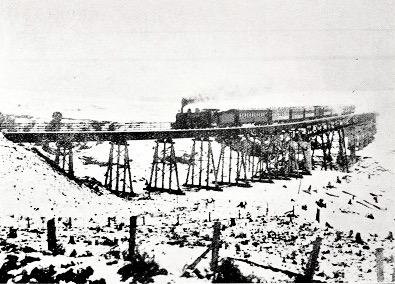
Ormondville Viaduct in snow in 1923

=== Ormondville viaduct ===
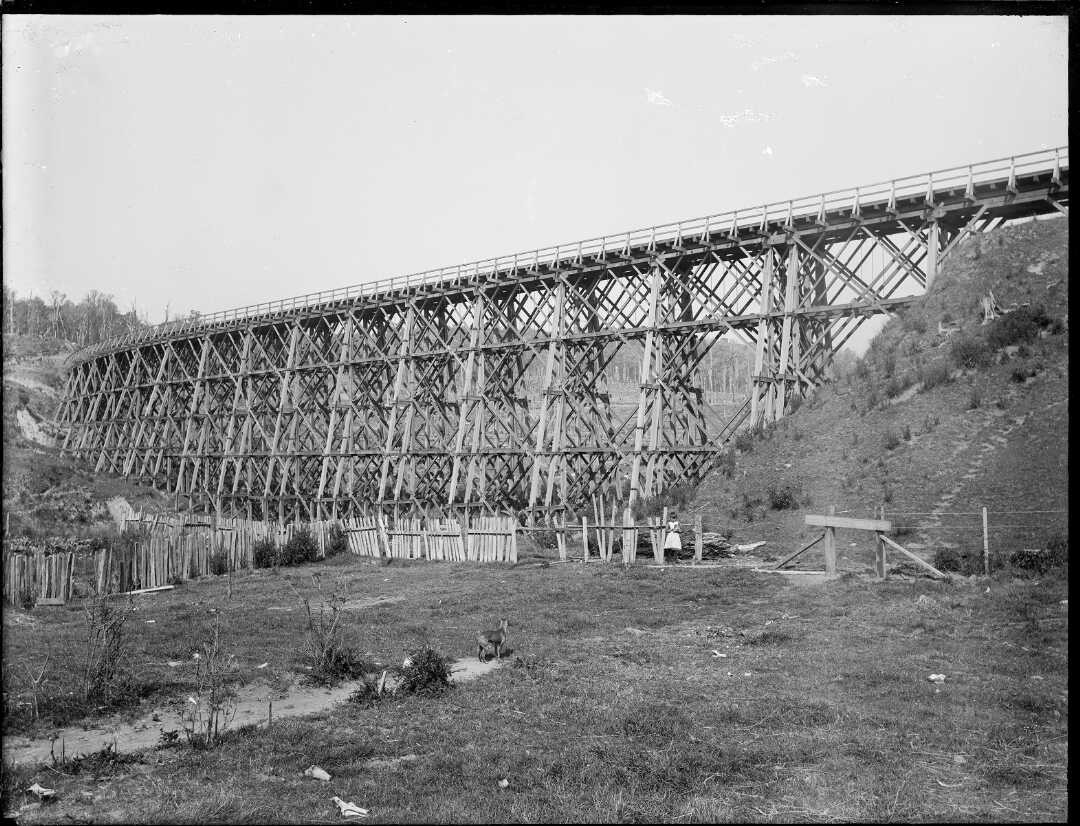
Ormondville Viaduct about 1880

Ormondville Viaduct (bridge 156) is 281 m (922 ft) long and 39 m (128 ft) above the Mangarangiora Stream. The original timber (probably totara) truss viaduct was built between 1878 and 1880 by Proudfoot and Angus Mackay (who built the bridge at Clive and who, in 1892, was the first Mayor of Dannevirke). It was 618 ft (188 m) long, 96 ft (29 m) above the stream and used 404,000 ft (123,000 m) of timber, and 20 tons of iron, in 21 x 30 ft (9.1 m) spans, 1 x 11 ft (3.4 m) and 1 x 6 ft (1.8 m). The contract for this and two neighbouring bridges was for £16,758, or £15,195 1s 8d.

J & A Anderson & Co of Christchurch won a tender for a wrought iron replacement on 16 November 1904 and completed the work with a ceremonial driving of the last rivet on 20 October 1906. In the same era Andersons also rebuilt Kopua (1895), Makotuku (1898), Matamau (1899), Mangatera (1900) and Makatote (1908) viaducts. There are 6 large viaducts on the 24.57 km (15.27 mi) between Kopua and Dannevirke, including Makotuku Viaduct, between Ormondville and Makotuku, which is 128 m (420 ft) long and 26 m (85 ft) high, over Makotuku Stream, a tributary of the Manawatū River. There was a minor fire on the viaduct on 1 February 1931.

Chimneys in Ormondville fell in the 1904 earthquake and after the 1931 quakes the viaduct was closed for repairs for a week in 1932. and then a washout occurred about a month later, after a new approach had been built. The bank approaching the viaduct also subsided slightly in a 1934 quake and again in 1961. One of the piers cracked by the 1931 quake was replaced in 1941. The Bay Express was stopped on the viaduct during the Weber earthquake in 1990 and a freight train during the 2014 Eketahuna earthquake. In 1990 the track at the northern end of the viaduct was left unsupported. Strengthening of the viaduct was in a 3-year plan announced in 2021.

== Demographics ==
Ormondville is described by Statistics New Zealand as a rural settlement and covers 0.29 km^{2} (0.11 sq mi). It had an estimated population of 90 as of June 2025, with a population density of 310 people per km^{2}. It is part of the larger Norsewood statistical area.

Historical population
Year	Pop.	±% p.a.
2006	75	—
2013	63	−2.46%
2018	69	+1.84%
2023	90	+5.46%

Ormondville had a population of 90 in the 2023 New Zealand census, an increase of 21 people (30.4%) since the 2018 census, and an increase of 27 people (42.9%) since the 2013 census. There were 42 males, 45 females, and 3 people of other genders in 42 dwellings. 3.3% of people identified as LGBTIQ+. The median age was 49.5 years (compared with 38.1 years nationally). There were 12 people (13.3%) aged under 15 years, 12 (13.3%) aged 15 to 29, 54 (60.0%) aged 30 to 64, and 12 (13.3%) aged 65 or older.

People could identify as more than one ethnicity. The results were 93.3% European (Pākehā), 26.7% Māori, and 6.7% Pasifika. English was spoken by 93.3%, Māori by 3.3%, and Samoan by 3.3%. No language could be spoken by 3.3% (e.g. too young to talk). New Zealand Sign Language was known by 3.3%. The percentage of people born overseas was 6.7, compared with 28.8% nationally.

Religious affiliations were 20.0% Christian, and 3.3% New Age. People who answered that they had no religion were 63.3%, and 10.0% of people did not answer the census question.

Of those at least 15 years old, 6 (7.7%) people had a bachelor's or higher degree, 48 (61.5%) had a post-high school certificate or diploma, and 27 (34.6%) people exclusively held high school qualifications. The median income was $28,600, compared with $41,500 nationally. 3 people (3.8%) earned over $100,000 compared to 12.1% nationally. The employment status of those at least 15 was 30 (38.5%) full-time, 12 (15.4%) part-time, and 6 (7.7%) unemployed.

== Education ==
Ormondville School opened in 1878 and merged into Norsewood School in 2003.

== Climate ==
Climate data for Kopua (1991–2020)
Month	Jan	Feb	Mar	Apr	May	Jun	Jul	Aug	Sep	Oct	Nov	Dec	Year
Mean daily maximum °C (°F)	22.6 (72.7)	22.5 (72.5)	20.6 (69.1)	17.6 (63.7)	15.0 (59.0)	12.4 (54.3)	11.6 (52.9)	12.5 (54.5)	14.5 (58.1)	16.6 (61.9)	18.1 (64.6)	20.7 (69.3)	17.1 (62.7)
Daily mean °C (°F)	17.2 (63.0)	17.3 (63.1)	15.4 (59.7)	12.9 (55.2)	10.6 (51.1)	8.3 (46.9)	7.7 (45.9)	8.4 (47.1)	10.1 (50.2)	11.9 (53.4)	13.3 (55.9)	15.7 (60.3)	12.4 (54.3)
Mean daily minimum °C (°F)	11.8 (53.2)	12.1 (53.8)	10.3 (50.5)	8.1 (46.6)	6.3 (43.3)	4.3 (39.7)	3.8 (38.8)	4.2 (39.6)	5.6 (42.1)	7.3 (45.1)	8.5 (47.3)	10.8 (51.4)	7.8 (46.0)
Average rainfall mm (inches)	74.7 (2.94)	76.3 (3.00)	74.4 (2.93)	73.2 (2.88)	81.1 (3.19)	97.8 (3.85)	116.2 (4.57)	87.0 (3.43)	85.5 (3.37)	90.1 (3.55)	72.1 (2.84)	76.1 (3.00)	1,004.5 (39.55)
Source: NIWA (rain 1981–2010)
