= Druse =

Druse can refer to:

- Druze, a Middle Eastern religious community
- Drusen, pathological deposits in the eye
- Druse (botany), an aggregation of calcium oxalate crystals found in certain plants
- Druse (geology), an incrustation of small crystals on the surface of a rock or mineral

== See also ==
- Druce (disambiguation)
