= Robin Briant =

New Zealand medical doctor (born 1939)

Robin Briant CBE
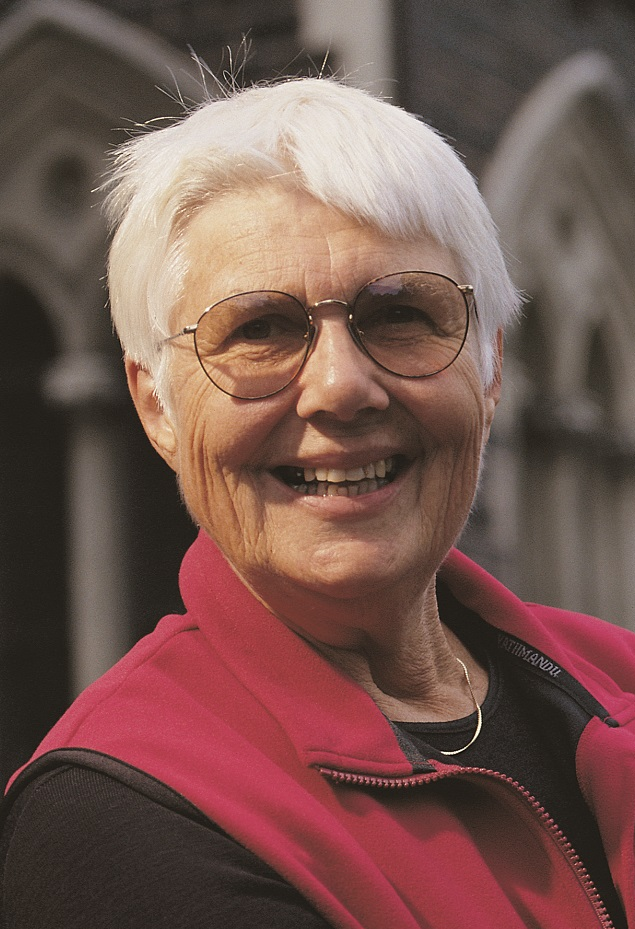
- Briant in 2005
- Born: 1939 (age 86–87); Gisborne
- Awards: New Zealand Suffrage Centennial Medal 1993, Commander of the Order of the British Empire, New Zealand 1990 Commemoration Medal

Academic background
- Education: Otago Medical School, Iona College
- Thesis: Metabolism of isoetherine and other bronchodilators in men and dog. (1973)
- Academic advisor: Colin Dollery

Academic work
- Institutions: Auckland City Hospital, University of Auckland

Robin Helen Briant CBE (born 1939) is a New Zealand doctor and clinical pharmacologist. In 1994 she was appointed a Commander of the Most Excellent Order of the British Empire for services to the medical profession. She was awarded a New Zealand 1990 Commemoration Medal and a New Zealand Suffrage Centennial Medal.

== Early life and education ==
Briant was born in Gisborne and grew up on a farm in Patutahi, as one of five children of Amy Helen and Stanley Daynton Briant. She attended Patutahi Primary School and Iona College in Havelock North. Briant graduated from high school in 1957 and worked as a laboratory technician for several years. Briant gained her medical degree at the University of Otago in 1965, and then worked as a house surgeon and a locum GP in Auckland. She passed her exams for the Royal Australasian College of Physicians at the beginning of 1969 and travelled to England, where she gained membership with the Royal College of Physicians. She was then offered a Wellcome Trust-funded research position with a registrar attachment at Hammersmith Hospital, under research pharmacologist Colin Dollery. Briant completed a Doctor of Medicine degree through Otago in 1974.

== Medical career ==
Returning to New Zealand after four years in England, Briant worked as a physician at Auckland Hospital, specialising in hypertension, and taught clinical pharmacology. Briant had been in England while abortion was liberalised, and also had become more aware of the women's rights movement. She volunteered at the Auckland Medical Aid Centre, providing abortion services, and became involved in the Medical Women's Association. In 1979 she spent time volunteering for World Vision in Thailand.

From 1987 to 1991 she was chair of the organisation International Physicians for the Prevention of Nuclear War. Briant was chair of the New Zealand Medical Council from 1991, and stepped down from the Medical Council in 1996. She resigned from the university around 1997, and from Auckland Hospital in 1999. She worked for Medicines Sans Frontieres in the West Bank and the Gaza Strip, in Abkhazia and in Pakistan. Moving to Wainui Beach in 2006, Briant worked as a physician at Gisborne Hospital and in diabetes and palliative care. She provides locum cover at Hospice Tairāwhiti.

== Honours and awards ==
In 1990 Briant was awarded a New Zealand 1990 Commemoration Medal. Commemoration Medals were awarded in recognition of the contribution recipients had made to some aspect of New Zealand life. In 1993 Briant was awarded a New Zealand Suffrage Centennial Medal. Suffrage Medals were awarded to people who had made a significant contribution to women's rights or women's issues in New Zealand.

In 1994 Briant was appointed a Commander of the Most Excellent Order of the British Empire for services to the medical profession.
