= Anthony Peter Druce =

New Zealand botanist (1920–1999)

Tony Druce
- Born: Anthony Peter Druce; 18 June 1920; Kumeroa, New Zealand
- Died: 15 March 1999 (aged 78); Hutt, New Zealand
- Education: University of Canterbury
- Known for: Botany
- Notable work: Botanical survey of an experimental catchment, Taita, New Zealand
- Spouse: Helen Margaret Druce (m. 1947)
- Children: 3
- Awards: Allan Mere award (1982)

Anthony Peter "Tony" Druce (June 18, 1920 – March 15, 1999) was a New Zealand botanist. He is considered the preeminent field botanist of New Zealand for the twentieth century.

Tony was born in Kumeroa. He attended Canterbury University College from 1939 to 1942, before he worked on radar in Auckland during World War II. In 1947, he joined DSIR's Botany Division, where he was given a technical role due to his lack of formal education. In 1957, he published Botanical survey of an experimental catchment, Taita, New Zealand, which "was the most detailed study of the history and dynamics of a small catchment's vegetation published to that time." It noted how gorse serves as a nursery plant for native species in New Zealand ecology, allowing regeneration of native bush.

In 1977, his second daughter, Fenella, died in a tramping incident near Aoraki / Mt. Cook. Druce and his wife, the botanist Helen Druce, built Fenella Hut as a memorial, now owned by DOC.

Tony edited the Wellington Botanical Society’s Bulletin from 1949 to 1966, and also served as the Society's vice-president in 1954 and 1962 and as its president in 1960–61 and 1976–7. He was also a major contributor to Audrey Eagle's Eagle's complete trees and shrubs of New Zealand.

Tony was honoured with the Allan Mere Award in 1987.

At least ten species of plant are named in honour of him, including Wahlenbergia pygmaea drucei. As an avid collector, he added over 37,000 specimens to Manaaki Whenua Landcare Research's herbarium at Lincoln. He also occasionally described new species, but often in collaboration. The Wellington Botanical Society has an annual Tony Druce Memorial Lecture named for him, often given at the AGM.
