= Iona College, Havelock North =

Iona College

Location
- 42 Lucknow Road, Havelock North, Hawke’s Bay; 39.6794°S 176.8784°E

Information
- Type: State integrated single sex-girls' school from Year 7 to Year 13 with Boarding Facilities
- Motto: Love Joy Peace
- Established: 1914; 112 years ago
- Ministry of Education Institution no.: 224
- Principal: Helen Armstrong
- Enrolment: 339 (July 2026)
- Socio-economic decile: 10Z
- Website: iona.school.nz

Iona College is a state-integrated girls' school in the Hawke's Bay area of New Zealand's North Island. Founded in 1914 by the Presbyterian Church, it was intended to provide boarding facilities for girls from rural communities. Today, the college has a capped roll of 330 New Zealand and international students – 170 boarders and 160 day girls.

A large performing arts centre and information centre started being built in March 2013 and were finished halfway through 2014. During the 100 years celebration that took place in March 2014 tours were conducted of the partially finished buildings.

== History ==
Iona College is the oldest Presbyterian School in New Zealand. It was established as a girls' boarding school built on land donated by Hugh Campbell.

The Prime Minister, the Right Honourable W F Massey, opened Iona College on 14 February 1914.

Iona opened with a roll of 48 pupils who were accommodated in buildings that were habitable but unfinished.

Iona's buildings were severely affected by the 1931 Hawke's Bay earthquake and the College had to be closed for a year while refinancing and rebuilding took place. The opening roll in 1932 was 27 boarders and nine-day pupils.

The school chapel is named after Saint Martin.

Iona was a private school until December 1998, when it integrated into the state education system.

Shannon Warren (formerly of Seymour College, Adelaide) replaced Pauline Duthie as Principal in July 2014.

== Enrolment ==
As of July 2026, Iona College has a roll of 339 students, of which 42 (12.4%) identify as Māori.

As of 2026, the school has an Equity Index of 396, placing it amongst schools whose students have fewest socioeconomic barriers to achievement (roughly equivalent to deciles 9 and 10 under the former socio-economic decile system).

== Notable alumnae ==
- Robin Briant (born 1939), doctor
- Helen Margaret Druce (1921–2010), teacher, tramper and botanist
- Sandra Edge (born 1962), Silver Fern
- Victoria Kelly, musician
