= Mangatewainui River =

Coordinates: 40°11′S 176°12′E

Location
- Country: New Zealand

Physical characteristics
- Mouth
  - location: Manawatū River
- Length: 27 km (17 mi)

The Mangatewainui River is a river of the Manawatū-Whanganui region of New Zealand's North Island. An upper tributary of the Manawatū River, it flows generally southeast from its sources in the Ruahine Range northwest of Norsewood, and meets the young Manawatū River 8 kilometres (5 mi) east of Dannevirke.

The Mangatewainui River should not be confused with its northern neighbour, the Mangatewai River.

== See also ==
- List of rivers of New Zealand
