= Kumeroa =

- Township
- Interactive map of Kumeroa
- Coordinates: 40.342924°S 175.989034°E
- Country: New Zealand
- Region: Manawatū-Whanganui
- Territorial authority: Tararua District
- Ward: South Tararua General Ward; Tamaki nui-a Rua Maori Ward
- Electorates: Wairarapa; Ikaroa-Rāwhiti (Māori)

Government
  - Territorial Authority: Tararua District Council
  - Regional council: Horizons Regional Council
  - Tararua Mayor: Scott Gilmore
  - Wairarapa MP: Mike Butterick
  - Ikaroa-Rāwhiti MP: Cushla Tangaere-Manuel

Area
  - Total: 2.81 km^{2} (1.08 sq mi)

Population (2023 census)
  - Total: 39
  - Density: 14/km^{2} (36/sq mi)

Kumeroa is a farming settlement in Tararua District and Manawatū-Whanganui region of New Zealand's North Island. It is about ten minutes' drive from Woodville, on the opposite side of the Manawatū River.

The township consists of a school, community hall, tennis club and church. Most residents live on farms or lifestyle blocks.

== Demographics ==
Kumeroa covers 2.81 km^{2} (1.08 sq mi). It is part of the larger Kaitawa statistical area.

Historical population
Year	Pop.	±% p.a.
2013	27	—
2018	45	+10.76%
2023	39	−2.82%

Kumeroa had a population of 39 in the 2023 New Zealand census, a decrease of 6 people (−13.3%) since the 2018 census, and an increase of 12 people (44.4%) since the 2013 census. There were 18 males and 21 females in 15 dwellings. The median age was 49.6 years (compared with 38.1 years nationally). There were 6 people (15.4%) aged under 15 years, 3 (7.7%) aged 15 to 29, 24 (61.5%) aged 30 to 64, and 6 (15.4%) aged 65 or older.

People could identify as more than one ethnicity. The results were 69.2% European (Pākehā), 23.1% Māori, 15.4% Asian, and 15.4% other, which includes people giving their ethnicity as "New Zealander". English was spoken by all, and Māori by 7.7%. The percentage of people born overseas was 23.1, compared with 28.8% nationally.

Religious affiliations were 30.8% Christian, and 7.7% other religions. People who answered that they had no religion were 53.8%, and 7.7% of people did not answer the census question.

Of those at least 15 years old, 6 (18.2%) people had a bachelor's or higher degree, 15 (45.5%) had a post-high school certificate or diploma, and 6 (18.2%) people exclusively held high school qualifications. The median income was $27,500, compared with $41,500 nationally. 3 people (9.1%) earned over $100,000 compared to 12.1% nationally. The employment status of those at least 15 was 15 (45.5%) full-time and 6 (18.2%) part-time.

== Education ==
Kumeroa School is a co-educational state primary school for Year 1 to 8 students, with a roll of 33 as of July 2026.

It opened in 1884. In 1994 it merged with Hopelands School (fl. 1906) and in 2009 with Kohinui School (established 1894).

Later in 2009, a Ministry of Education review proposed closing eight of the ten schools in the Tararua bush area, including Kumeroa. Principal Jo Gibbs told the Dominion Post she was shocked by the proposal.

The school was known as Kumeroa-Hopelands School until 2018.

Students at the school have designed, built and run a vegetable garden, chicken coop, worm farm and pizza oven. The school has a wētā house in trees and a greenhouse constructed out of recycled plastic bottles. Students also do pest control and run a beehive at a local QEII National Trust covenant block.

Each year, students also shoot and trap possums for the school's Possum Hunt Gala, take part in the Young Farmer of the Year competition, and sell sunflowers on the side of the road for fundraising.
