= Colin Dollery =

British pharmacologist (1931–2020)

Sir Colin Terence Dollery (14 March 1931 – 12 December 2020) was a clinical pharmacologist who spent much of his life working for SmithKline Beecham and its successor, Glaxo Smith Kline. He was knighted in the Queen's 1987 birthday honours. He was an honorary fellow of the British Pharmacological Society and a fellow of the Academy of Medical Sciences.

== Biography ==
After graduating in medicine from the University of Birmingham in 1956, Dollery specialized in clinical pharmacology. He was appointed as a lecturer in therapeutics at the Royal Postgraduate Medical School, London, in 1963 and was promoted to Professor of Clinical Pharmacology in 1968. Throughout his career, he held several notable positions:

- Founding Chairman of the Clinical Pharmacology Section of the British Pharmacological Society (1975–1975)
- Chair of the Clinical Section of the International Union of Pharmacology (IUPHAR; 1975–1978)
- President of the IUPHAR (1987–1990).

He received many awards including the Wellcome Gold Medal awarded by the British Pharmacological Society. His work led to major advances in cardiovascular pharmacology including work with the Nobel Laureate, Sir James Black concerning beta blockers. Dollery spent time in both academia and industry (SmithKline Beecham and then GSK post the merger). He was also active within IUPHAR, where he was part of the clinical translational pharmacology group of the Nomenclature Committee.

His fields of interest included hypertension and drug safety.

In 1993, he delivered the Harveian Oration.

== Books ==
Books authored or edited include:

- Dollery, Colin T. (1978). The end of an age of optimism : medical science in retrospect and prospect. London: Nuffield Provincial Hospitals Trust. ISBN 0900574291.
- Dollery, Colin (1999). Therapeutic drugs (2nd ed.). Edinburgh: Churchill Livingstone. ISBN 0443051488.
- Dollery, Colin; Williams, John, eds. (1996). Informatics in undergraduate medical and dental curricula. London: Royal Society of Medicine. ISBN 1853152846.
