= Helen Margaret Druce =

New Zealand teacher and botanical collector

- Born: Helen Margaret Hodgson; July 21, 1921; Hastings, New Zealand
- Died: 2010
- Education: Canterbury University College
- Spouse: Anthony Peter Druce
- Scientific career
- Fields: botany, botanical collecting, teaching

Helen Margaret Druce née Hodgson (July 21, 1921–2010) was a New Zealand teacher, tramper, botanist and botanical collector.

== Life ==
Druce was educated at Napier Girls' High School and Iona Presbyterian School for Girls. She earned a master's degree in geography from the Canterbury University College. She married New Zealand botanist Anthony Peter Druce in December 1947. She was a member of the Wellington Botanical Society, Canterbury University Tramping Club and Royal Forest and Bird Protection Society of New Zealand. Druce's botanical specimens are housed at herbaria at Te Papa, the Auckland War Memorial Museum, and Manaaki Whenua - Landcare Research.
