= Mangatera River =

Coordinates: 39°39′S 176°03′E

Location
- Country: New Zealand

Physical characteristics
- Mouth
  - location: Waiokotore Stream
- Length: 13 km (8.1 mi)

The Mangatera River is a river of the Manawatū-Whanganui region of New Zealand's North Island. It flows northwest from its origins in the Ruahine Range to reach the Waiokotore Stream 27 kilometres (17 mi) east of Taihape.

== See also ==
- List of rivers of New Zealand
