= Norsewood =

Settlement in Manawatū-Whanganui Region, New Zealand

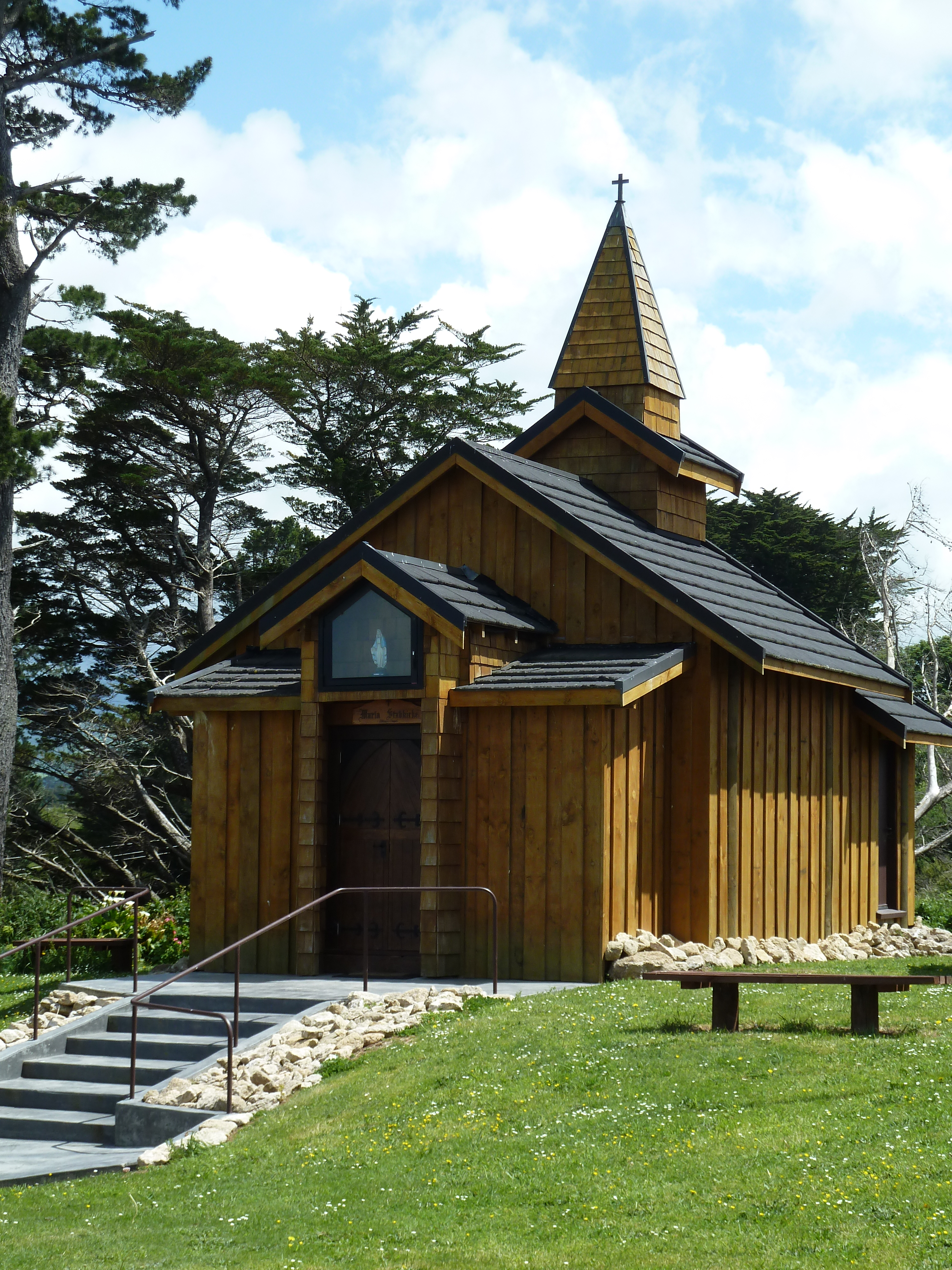
- Stave church replica on Coronation Street.
- Interactive map of Norsewood
- Coordinates: 40°04′S 176°13′E
- Country: New Zealand
- Region: Manawatū-Whanganui
- Territorial authority: Tararua District
- Ward: North Tararua General Ward; Tamaki nui-a Rua Maori Ward
- Community: Dannevirke Community
- Electorates: Wairarapa; Ikaroa-Rāwhiti (Māori)

Government
  - Type: Territorial Authority
  - Body: Tararua District Council
  - Tararua Mayor: Scott Gilmore
  - Wairarapa MP: TBD
  - Ikaroa-Rāwhiti MP: Cushla Tangaere-Manuel
  - Regional council: Horizons Regional Council

Area
  - Total: 0.38 km^{2} (0.15 sq mi)

Population (June 2025)
  - Total: 150
  - Density: 390/km^{2} (1,000/sq mi)
- Time zone: UTC+12 (NZST)
  - Summer (DST): UTC+13 (NZDT)
- Postcode: 4974

Norsewood is a small rural settlement in the Tararua District and Manawatū-Whanganui region of New Zealand's North Island. The town is situated east of the Ruahine Mountain range and is located 20 kilometres northeast of Dannevirke.

== Geography ==
The Norsewood area, as defined by Statistics New Zealand, covers 397.35 km^{2}, including the township and the surrounding rural hinterland.

The source of the Manawatū River is located behind the settlement, at the end of Manawatu River Road, forming the natural boundary for the region and Hawke's Bay to the north.

The village consists of two parts. Upper Norsewood features the town's main road, Coronation Street, a gift shop, a visitor's centre and a Pioneer Museum housed in an 1888 building. Lower Norsewood, located 1 km to the south, features Hovding Street and Norsewear, a company which provides woolen garments in Norwegian designs.

Upper and Lower Norsewood lie on either side of State Highway 2.

== History ==
=== Early settlement ===
Norsewood was founded by mainly Norwegian settlers in 1872 as a loggers’ settlement and retains a Scandinavian tenor. The village was carved out of the forest, and was subsequently destroyed in a fire in 1888.

The government of New Zealand requested Norwegian immigrants and made an agreement with Winge & Co. in Christiania, which would allow for 3,000 emigrants to New Zealand. In the years 1870–76, nearly 1,000 Norwegians moved to the Norsewood area.

=== Modern township ===
The settlement continues to celebrate its Scandinavian culture. A Scandinavian festival is held every year. Traditional celebrations of Norway's Constitution Day are held on the Sunday closest to 17 May.

The main square by Coronation Street welcomes visitors to "Little Norway", and a Norwegian flag flies from the street's tourist office. The Bindalsfaering, a fishing boat gifted by the Norwegian Government, is displayed in a glassed boat-house in Upper Norsewood, near a replica of a Norwegian stave church.

== Demography ==
Norsewood is described by Statistics New Zealand as a rural settlement, which covers 0.38 km^{2} (0.15 sq mi). It had an estimated population of 150 as of June 2025, with a population density of 395 people per km^{2}. The settlement is part of the larger Norsewood statistical area.

Historical population for Norsewood settlement
Year	Pop.	±% p.a.
2006	138	—
2013	111	−3.06%
2018	135	+3.99%
2023	150	+2.13%

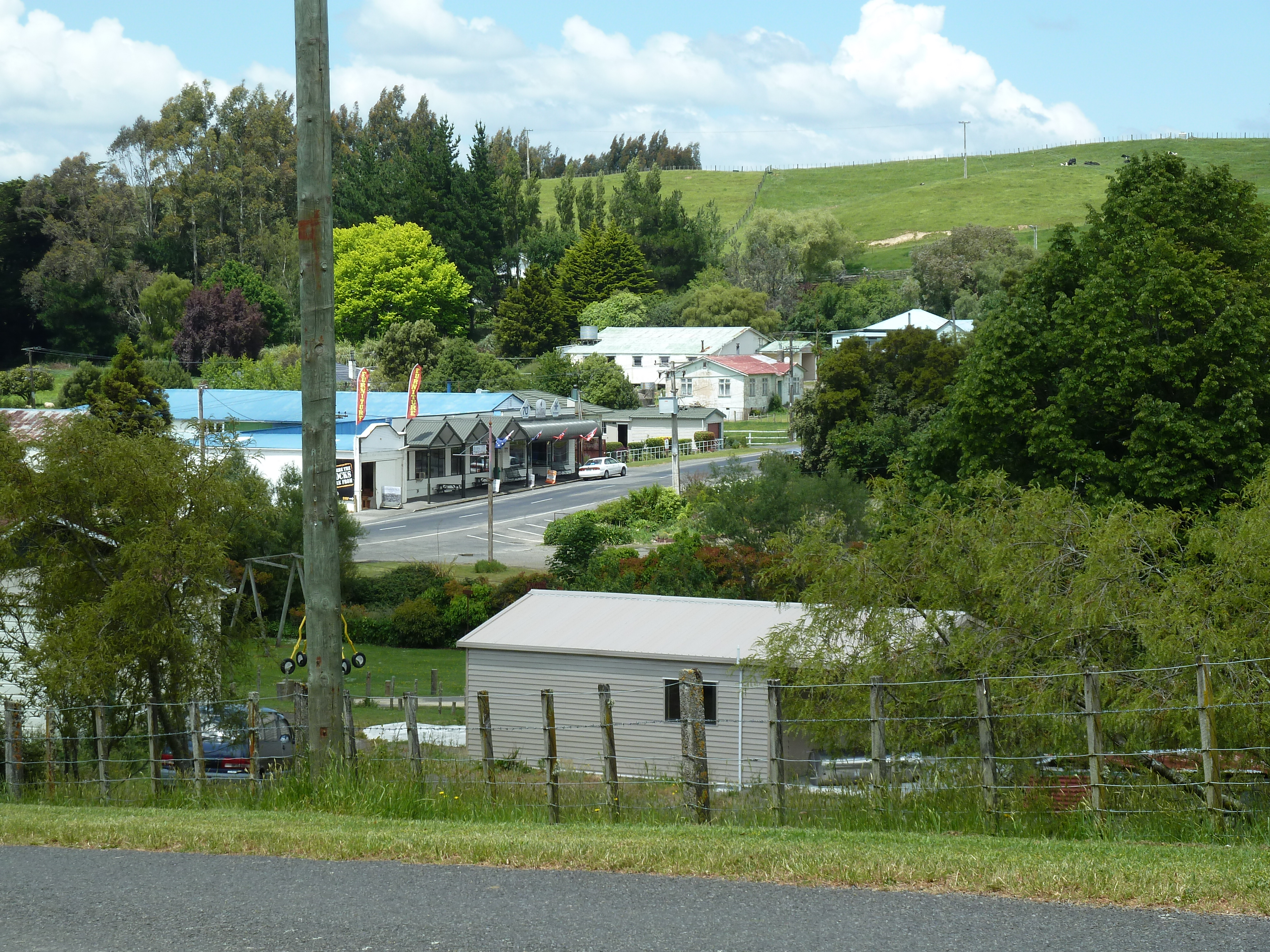
Lower Norsewood, Hovding Street and Norsewear

Norsewood had a population of 150 in the 2023 New Zealand census, an increase of 15 people (11.1%) since the 2018 census, and an increase of 39 people (35.1%) since the 2013 census. There were 75 males and 72 females in 63 dwellings. 6.0% of people identified as LGBTIQ+. The median age was 43.8 years (compared with 38.1 years nationally). There were 27 people (18.0%) aged under 15 years, 24 (16.0%) aged 15 to 29, 72 (48.0%) aged 30 to 64, and 27 (18.0%) aged 65 or older.

People could identify as more than one ethnicity. The results were 80.0% European (Pākehā), 32.0% Māori, 2.0% Pasifika, and 2.0% Asian. English was spoken by 98.0%, Māori by 4.0%, and other languages by 4.0%. No language could be spoken by 2.0% (e.g. too young to talk). The percentage of people born overseas was 10.0, compared with 28.8% nationally.

Religious affiliations were 18.0% Christian, 6.0% Māori religious beliefs, 2.0% Buddhist, and 2.0% New Age. People who answered that they had no religion were 58.0%, and 12.0% of people did not answer the census question.

Of those at least 15 years old, 6 (4.9%) people had a bachelor's or higher degree, 78 (63.4%) had a post-high school certificate or diploma, and 39 (31.7%) people exclusively held high school qualifications. The median income was $28,800, compared with $41,500 nationally. 3 people (2.4%) earned over $100,000 compared to 12.1% nationally. The employment status of those at least 15 was 57 (46.3%) full-time, 18 (14.6%) part-time, and 3 (2.4%) unemployed.

=== Norsewood statistical area ===
Norsewood statistical area, which also includes Ormondville, covers 397.44 km^{2} (153.45 sq mi) and had an estimated population of 1,710 as of June 2025, with a population density of 4.3 people per km^{2}.

Historical population of the statistical area
Year	Pop.	±% p.a.
2006	1,545	—
2013	1,548	+0.03%
2018	1,611	+0.80%
2023	1,692	+0.99%

Norsewood had a population of 1,692 in the 2023 New Zealand census, an increase of 81 people (5.0%) since the 2018 census, and an increase of 144 people (9.3%) since the 2013 census. There were 864 males, 819 females, and 9 people of other genders in 642 dwellings. 2.7% of people identified as LGBTIQ+. The median age was 46.6 years (compared with 38.1 years nationally). There were 312 people (18.4%) aged under 15 years, 240 (14.2%) aged 15 to 29, 813 (48.0%) aged 30 to 64, and 330 (19.5%) aged 65 or older.

People could identify as more than one ethnicity. The results were 88.7% European (Pākehā); 22.5% Māori; 2.5% Pasifika; 1.1% Asian; 0.4% Middle Eastern, Latin American and African New Zealanders (MELAA); and 2.8% other, which includes people giving their ethnicity as "New Zealander". English was spoken by 97.9%, Māori by 3.2%, Samoan by 0.4%, and other languages by 2.8%. No language could be spoken by 2.0% (e.g. too young to talk). New Zealand Sign Language was known by 0.5%. The percentage of people born overseas was 8.9, compared with 28.8% nationally.

Religious affiliations were 29.1% Christian, 0.2% Hindu, 1.6% Māori religious beliefs, 0.4% Buddhist, 1.4% New Age, and 0.5% other religions. People who answered that they had no religion were 57.8%, and 9.0% of people did not answer the census question.

Of those at least 15 years old, 153 (11.1%) people had a bachelor's or higher degree, 837 (60.7%) had a post-high school certificate or diploma, and 387 (28.0%) people exclusively held high school qualifications. The median income was $34,700, compared with $41,500 nationally. 105 people (7.6%) earned over $100,000 compared to 12.1% nationally. The employment status of those at least 15 was 666 (48.3%) full-time, 240 (17.4%) part-time, and 36 (2.6%) unemployed.

== Economy ==
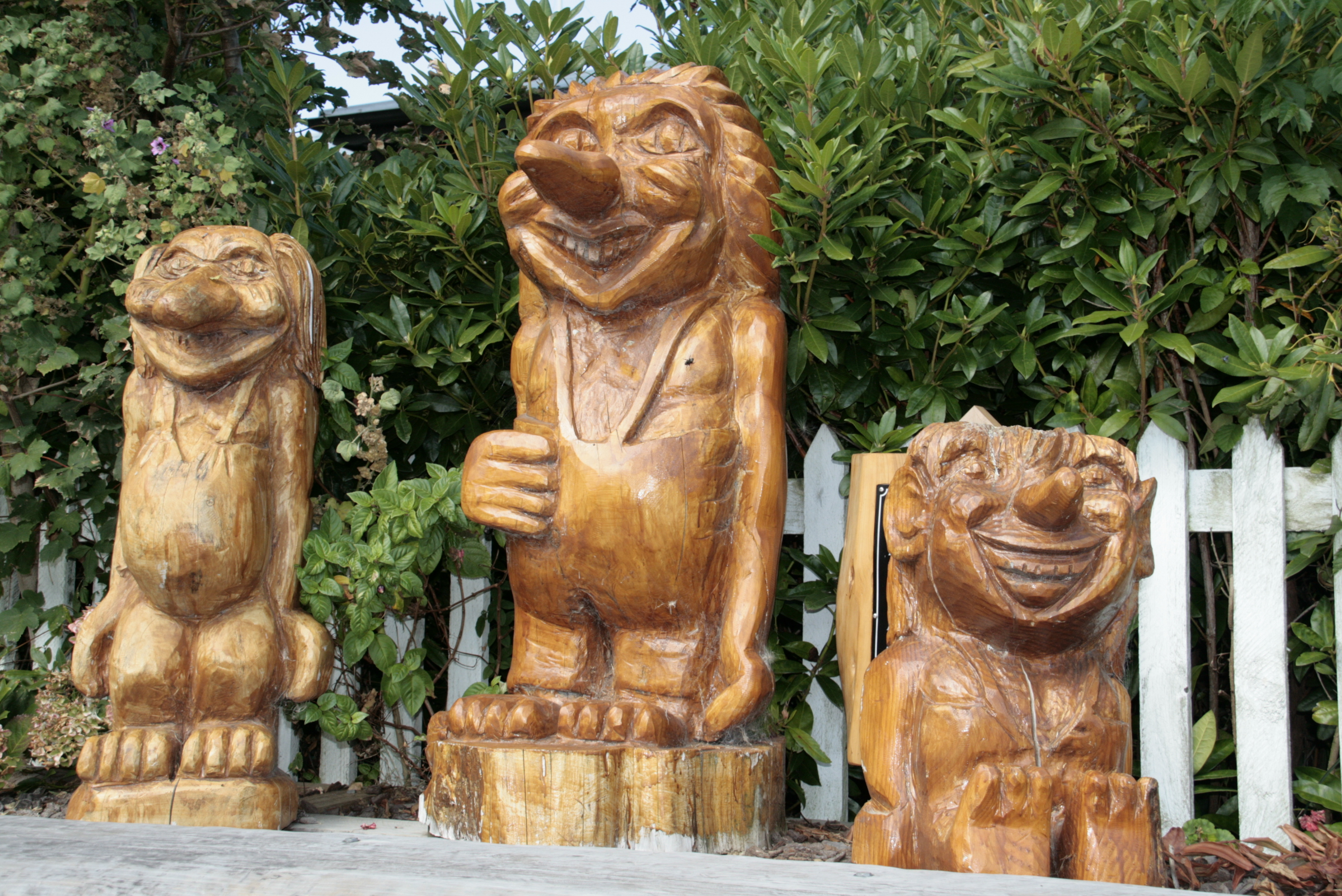
Good luck Trolls of Norsewood

In 2018, 14.1% of the workforce worked in manufacturing, 3.4% worked in construction, 0.0% worked in retail and wholesale, 2.4% worked in hospitality, 2.8% worked in transport, 6.6% worked in education, and 6.9% worked in healthcare.

Crown Hotel is a local pub and meeting place.

== Transport ==
As of 2018, among those who commute to work, 63.1% drove a car, 1.4% rode in a car, 0.3% use a bike, and 0.3% walk or run. No one commuted by public transport.

== Education ==
Norsewood and Districts School is a co-educational state primary school for Year 1 to 8 students, with a roll of 41 as of July 2026. It opened in 1873. A fire destroyed the school building in 1888, and it was rebuilt within six months. In 2004, Matamau School (established 1887), Awariki School (established 1904) and Ormondville School (established 1878) merged into Norsewood School to form Norsewood and Districts.

== In popular culture ==
The town appears in the television series The Almighty Johnsons, where some of its descendants are the reincarnations of Norse gods.
