= Mayor of Tararua =

Head of the municipal government of Tararua, New Zealand

- Incumbent; Scott Gilmore since 2025
- Style: His/Her Worship
- Term length: Three years, renewable
- Inaugural holder: Bob Trotter
- Formation: 1989
- Deputy: Sharon Wards
- Salary: $128,685
- Website: Official website

The mayor of Tararua officiates over the Tararua District Council.

Scott Gilmore is the current mayor of Tararua. He has been mayor since 2025.

== List of mayors ==
Since its inception in 1989, Tararua District has had six mayors:

| | Name | Portrait | Term |
|---|---|---|---|
| 1 | Bob Trotter | | 1989–1995 |
| 2 | Bill Bly | | 1995–1998 |
| 3 | Maureen Reynolds | | 1998–2010 |
| 4 | Roly Ellis | | 2010–2016 |
| 5 | Tracey Collis | | 2016–2025 |
| 6 | Scott Gilmore | | 2025–present |

== List of deputy mayors ==
| Name | Term | Mayor |
|---|---|---|
| David Lea | 1998–2010 | Reynolds |
| Bill Keltie | 2010–2016 | Ellis |
| Allan Benbow | 2016–2019 | Collis |
| Erana Peeti-Webber | 2019–2025 | Collis |
| Sharon Wards | 2025–present | Gilmore |
