= Mangatera railway station =

Defunct railway station in New Zealand

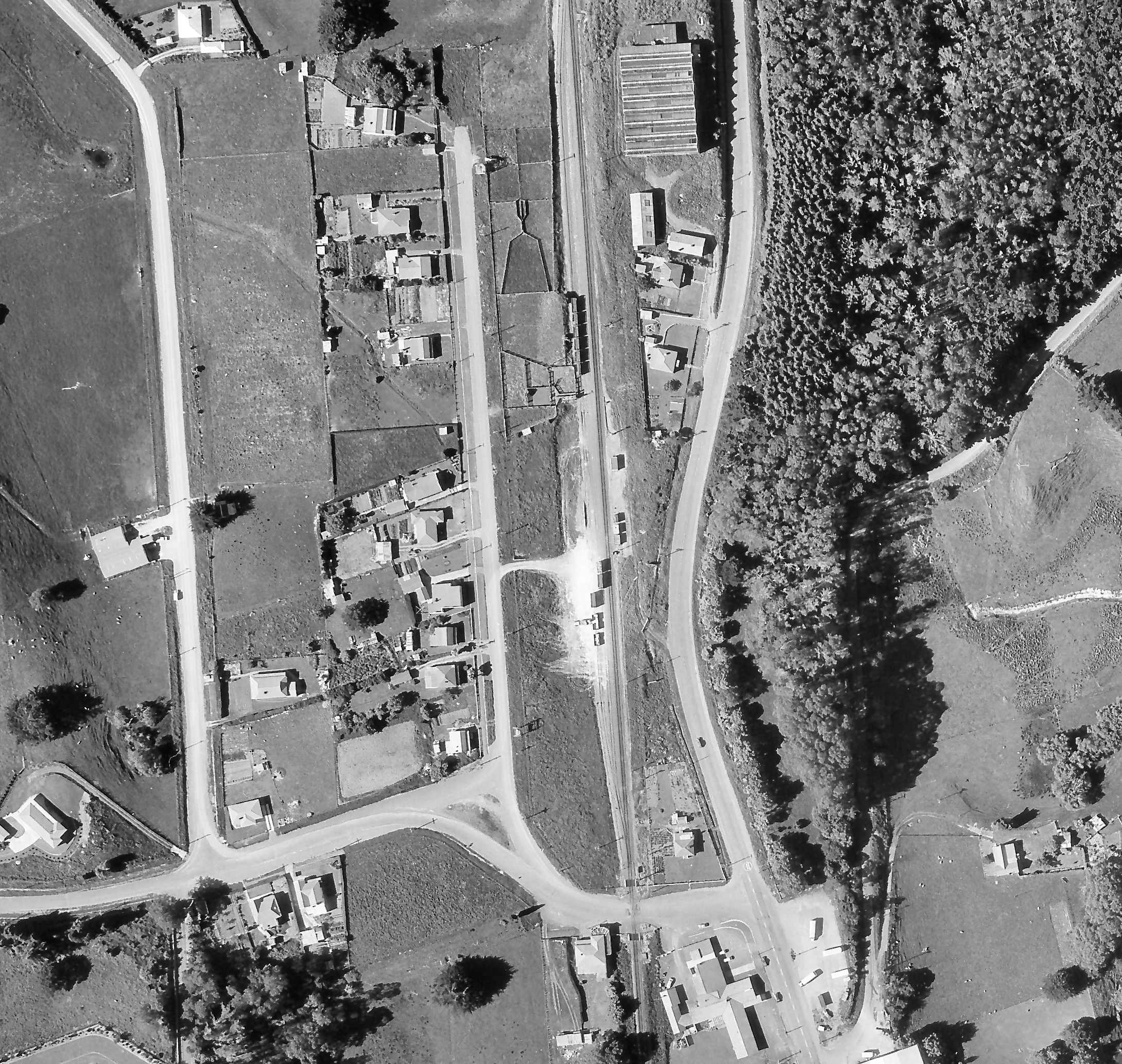
- Mangatera 1962 – trucks by the stockyard, a shelter on the other side of the line and the hotel to the south

General information
- Coordinates: 40°11′23″S 176°06′46″E
- Elevation: 223 m (732 ft)
- Owner: KiwiRail
- Line: Palmerston North–Gisborne Line
- Distance: Palmerston North 58.5 km (36.4 mi)

History
- Opened: 15 December 1884
- Closed: 2 October 1977 reopened 29 July 1979 closed 27 September 1981 closed to passengers by 1976

Services
| Preceding station | Historical railways | Following station |
|---|---|---|
| Dannevirke; Line open, station closed 2.63 km (1.63 mi) towards PN | Palmerston North–Gisborne Line; KiwiRail | Piripiri; Line open, station closed 2.31 km (1.44 mi) towards Napier |
Location

Mangatera railway station on the Palmerston North–Gisborne line of the North Island of New Zealand opened on 15 December 1884, as part of the 7 mi 43 ch (12.1 km) Matamau-Tahoraiti (since renamed Tapuata) extension of the line from Napier.

It served what is now a northern suburb of Dannevirke, in the Manawatū-Whanganui region. The initial settlers were Danish. Mangatera now has 1,785 people (2018 census) in 11 meshblocks. Mangatera had a population of 21 in 1891, 134 in 1911 and 47 in 1956. It was 76 mi 37 ch (123.1 km) south of Napier and 35 mi 30 ch (56.9 km) north of Palmerston North Central.

The station closed to passengers by 1976 and completely on 27 September 1981, though it had closed on 2 October 1977 and reopened 29 July 1979. A single track runs through the station site.

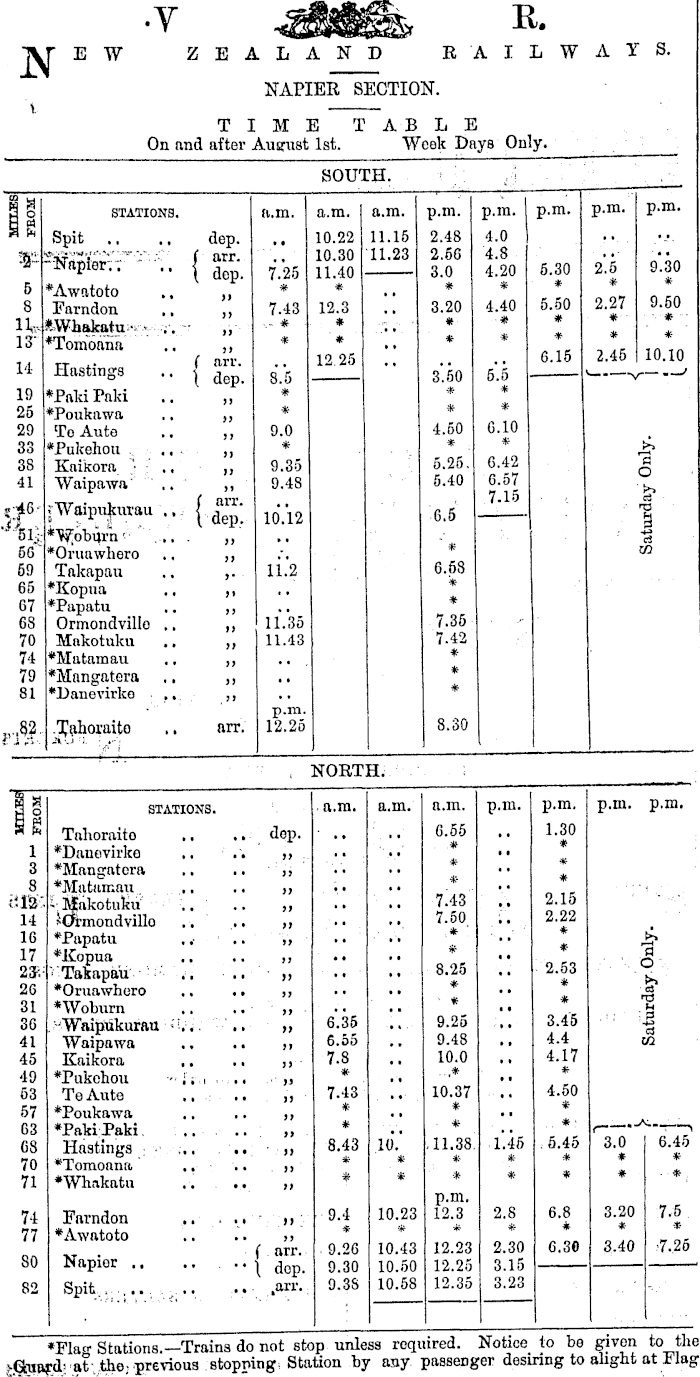
1885 Spit-Tahoraiti timetable

== History ==
The area was part of the Ngāti Raukawa rohe, in the Seventy Mile bush, most of which remained when the railway opened, but sawmills were set up as soon as the line opened –

=== Timber ===
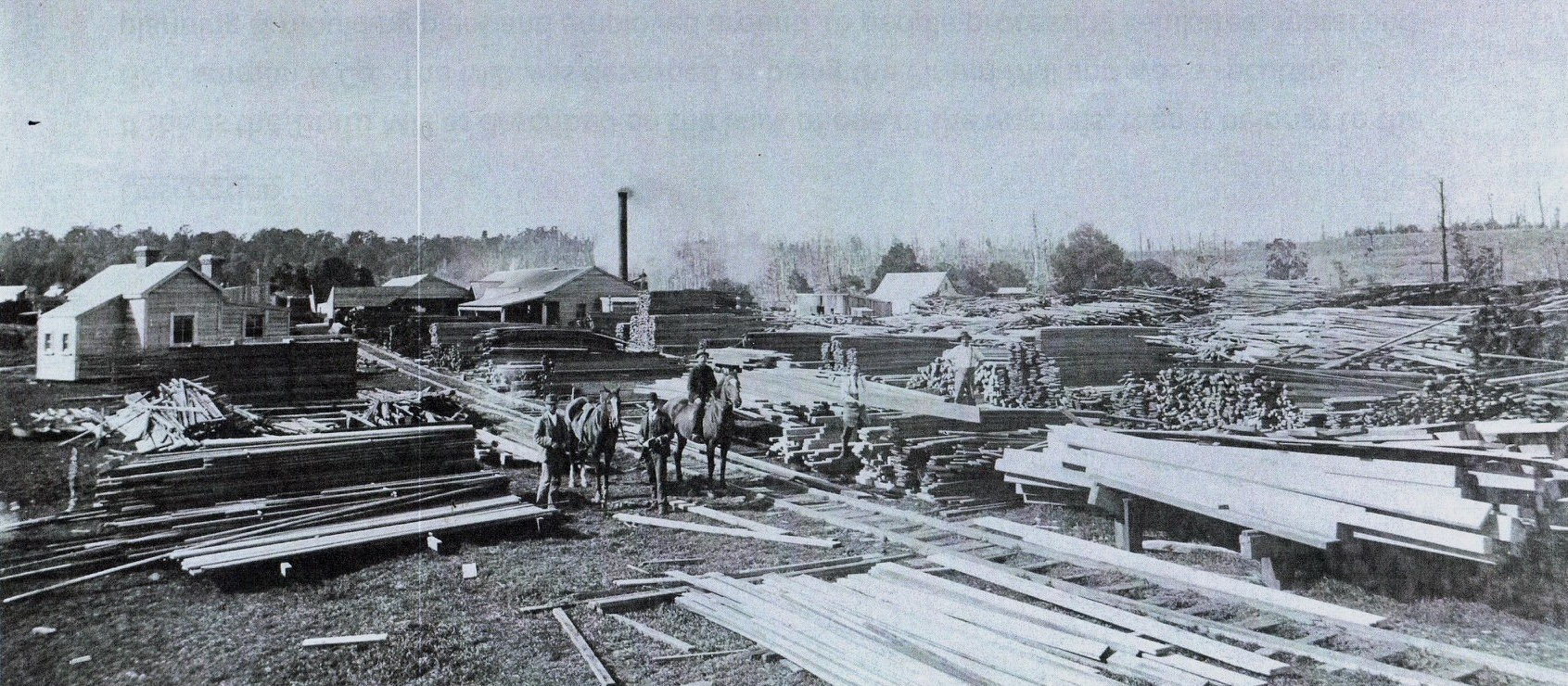
Probably Tiratu mill about 1908

J Mortensen leased the bush as far as Piripiri in 1885 and his sawmills included Mangatera, in over 11,000 acres (4,500 ha), to cut tōtara, mataī, rimu and kahikatea. Lycett & Cross's mill, beside the station and the Umotoroa Block, opened on 13 June 1887. Piri Piri Sawmill Co opened in 1893, its timber being carted to Mangatera, though a tramway was soon started from the station into the Piripiri bush and, on 24 October 1896, they asked for a tramway crossing near Mangatera. In 1894 H A Banner applied for a siding and right to lay tramway on railway land was leased to T Tanner. Tiratu Sawmilling Company, cutting tōtara, built a 4 mi (6.4 km) tramway in 1897, with a bridge over the Mangatera Stream, and running beside Tipapakuku Road. They applied for a tramway extension in 1901 and by 1907 had a total of 20 staff. Their planing-mill burnt down in 1902 and 1911, but was rebuilt each time. Tiratu had a siding from about 1896 to 1956. W F Greenaway applied for a new tramway in 1900 and opened another mill in 1902. Rogers opened a new mill in 1901. By 1905 Mangatera planing-mill belonged to Tiratu and, nearby, Umutaoroa Sawmilling Company was taking timber for Wellington and Whanganui. By 1915 the former bush was being grassed for farmland.

=== Construction delays ===
In 1879 about 10 mi (16 km) of the line from about 2 mi (3.2 km) north of Piripiri to Oringi was surveyed. A Royal Commissioner reported adversely on the Napier line extension to Woodville, which stopped until the end of 1881, except for a few short lengths for unemployment relief just before the 1881 election. Joseph Jay & Henry James Haines won the Kopua to Tahoraiti contract for £13,615 on 8 June 1883, but they claimed unusually bad weather caused them to fail and the Government took over. Their engineer was J. T. Carr, assisted by J. Fulton, H. F. Moody and D. Ross, the bridge contractors were Proudfoot & McKay, Dunedin, Joseph Saunders, Wellington and H. M'Kenzie & Co, Dunedin and D Glendinning, Napier, was the permanent way contractor. Although the line to Tahoraiti was reported as ready to open on 1 December 1884, it wasn't until 15 December 1884 that the 7 mi 43 ch (12.1 km) Matamau to Tahoraiti section opened. The excursion train at the opening carried about 500 and 4 coach loads continued to Woodville.

=== Services and accommodation ===
Mangatera was a flag station, with 2 trains a day each way from opening in 1884 until 1892 when it gained an extra train each way. It lost a service in 1917 when the mail train was speeded up.

By 1896 there was a shelter shed, platform, cart approach, cattle yards, urinals and a passing loop for 19 wagons, extended to 30 by 1898. A loading bank was added in 1905. In 1895 cattle yards were moved from Tapuata to Mangatera. They were said to be inadequate in 1910, damaged in 1916, had only one light in 1965, were repaired and reduced in 1972 and were closed on 28 June 1978. An 1883 inspector's cottage seems to have been described as a stationmaster's house by 1884. A post office opened in 1889 run by Mr Friis.

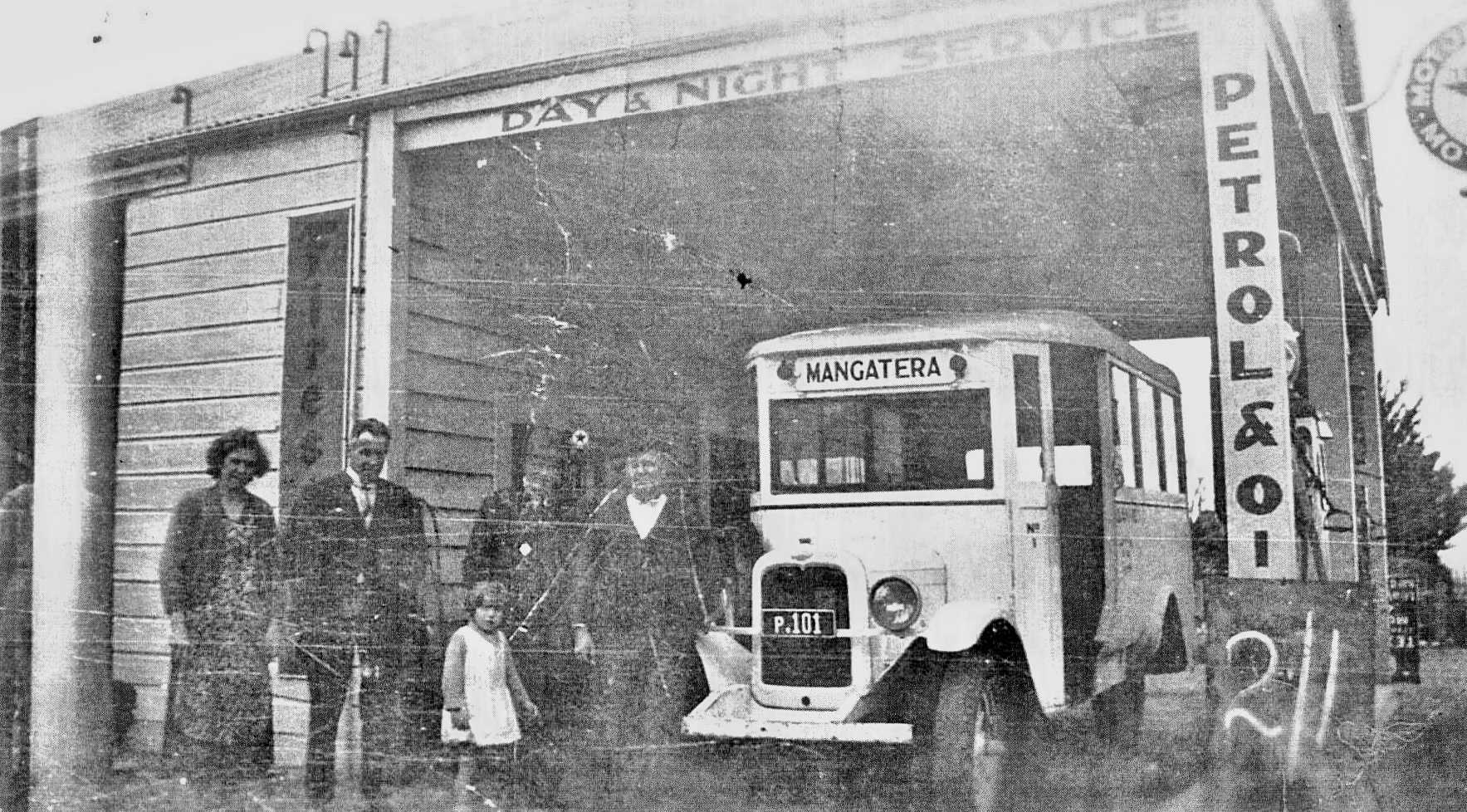
Mangatera bus

A bus started running in Dannevirke in 1898 and was serving Mangatera in 1904. White Buses were running a service between Mangatera and Dannevirke in 1936.

=== Other freight sources ===
Collett & Son established a business in Petone in 1875. were incorporated in 1909 and by 1913 had branches at Ohakune and Taumarunui. Their coach-building factory had become a foundry and engineering business, building sawmills for Perham, Larsen & Co at Rangitana, Egmont Box Company's near Taihape, Taringamutu Co, Goldfinch at Horopiti, and the Government mill at Kakahi. Products included brickmaking machinery, winches, lifts, presses, agricultural implements, pulleys, hauling blocks, bogies, wagons, roller bearings, friezes, fences, oil-boring drills, curd mills, cheese presses and dairy factory vats. They could turn shafts up to 40 feet in length and 8 feet in diameter, with 65 staff. They built a temporary works in Barraud Street after a fire in 1917. By 1918 they were also making wool dryers and road-making machinery. A new engineering works opened in 1927, when they moved from Dannevirke. After the owner's death in 1938 the foundry was taken over by Cables. The building and railway siding were still in use in 1989.

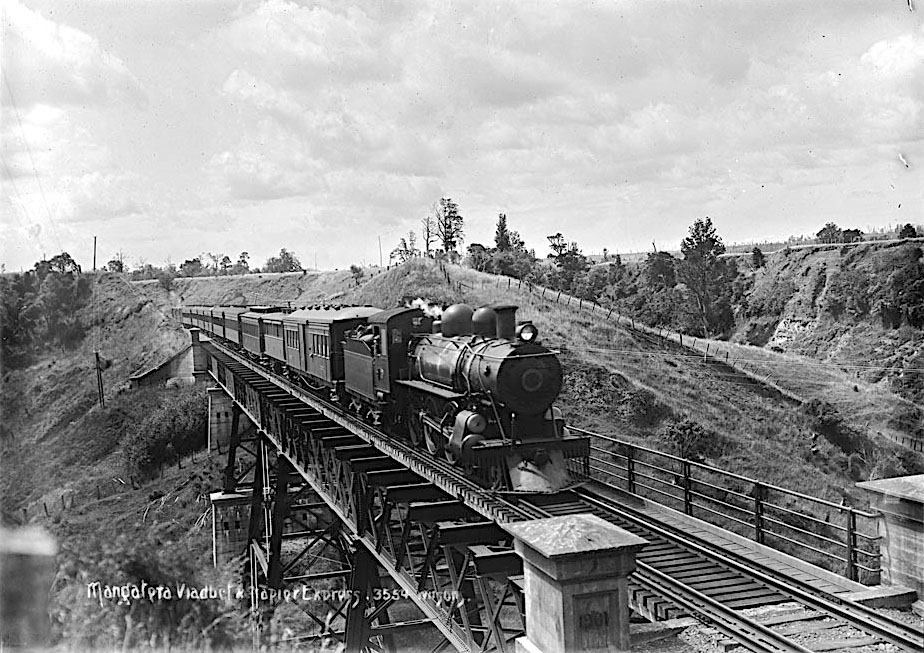
Mangatera Viaduct around 1910

== Mangatera Viaduct ==
Mangatera Viaduct is one of 6 large viaducts on the 24.57 km (15.27 mi) between Kopua and Dannevirke. It crosses the Mangatera Stream and is 100 m (330 ft) long and up to 25 m (82 ft) high. It is now Bridge 145, a short distance north of Mangatera station. An 1882 contract gave the job of building both Piripiri and Mangatera viaducts to M McKenzie of Dunedin for £9,350. McKenzie cut the tōtara for the viaducts in a mill between Woodville and Dannevirke.

In 1900 J & A Anderson & Co of Christchurch won a tender for a wrought iron replacement viaduct.

Underpinning with reinforced concrete beams was tendered for in 1969.

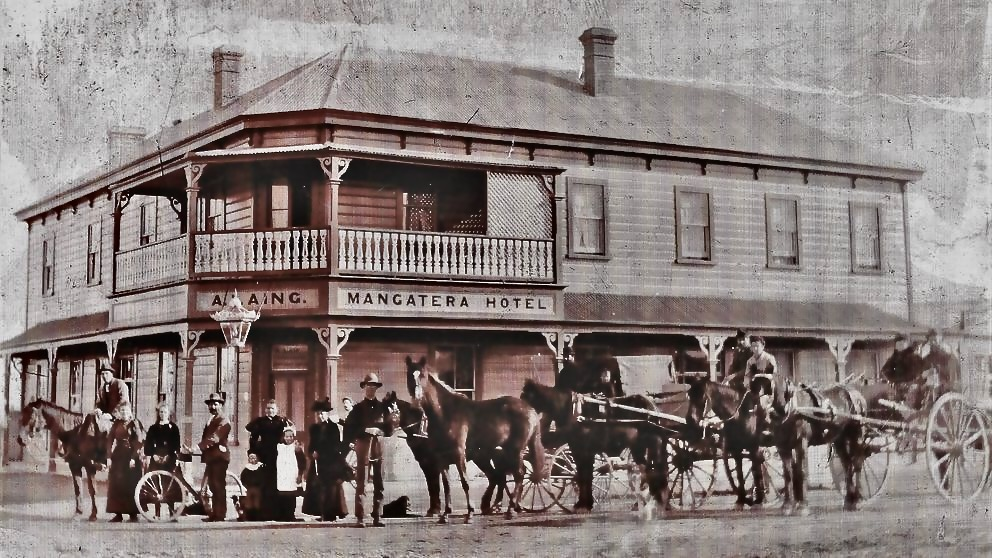
Mangatera Hotel 1895

== Hotel ==
Matamau Hotel opened in October 1881. In February 1885 it lost its license and was moved to Mangatera, opening in May 1885. Hotels at Norsewood and Ormondville had also closed, so that those in Dannevirke were busy. New licenses were granted to the Junction and Mangatera Hotels in 1887. It was first built between 1867 and 1887 for Lawritz Friis as a small, single-storey building. It burned down on 19 April 1890. A new 10, or 13-room, hotel was built for Mr Polsen in 1890. It burnt down on 4 October 1954, when one resident was killed. A warehouse was built in the 1980s for a bottle store.

== Cemetery ==
Burials at Mangatera Cemetery began by 1911 and it was consecrated in 1912. It has 10 burials from the 1914–1918 war and 5 from the 1939–1945 war.
