= Tapuata railway station =

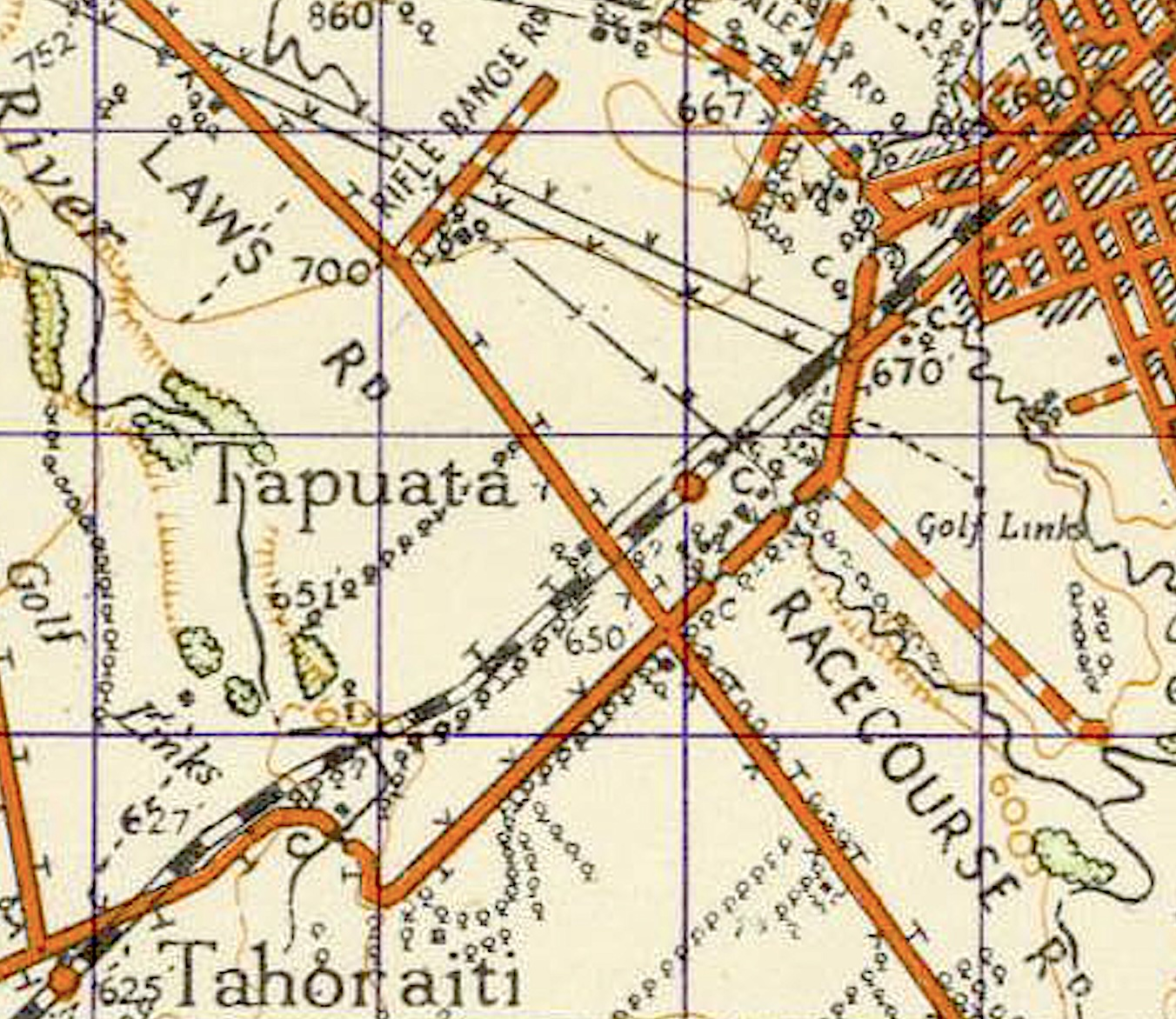
- Tapuata on 1943 map

General information
- Coordinates: 40°13′10″S 176°04′52″E
- Elevation: 199 m (653 ft)
- Owner: KiwiRail
- Line: Palmerston North–Gisborne Line
- Distance: Palmerston North 54.01 km (33.56 mi)

History
- Opened: 15 December 1884
- Closed: 27 September 1981 closed to passengers by 1993
- Former names: Tahoraiti until 8 April 1889; Tamaki Siding until 5 October 1929

Services
| Preceding station | Historical railways | Following station |
|---|---|---|
| Tahoraite; Line open, station closed 2.43 km (1.51 mi) towards PN | Palmerston North–Gisborne Line; KiwiRail | Dannevirke; Line open, station closed 1.86 km (1.16 mi) towards Napier |
Location

Tapuata railway station, on the Palmerston North–Gisborne line, opened on 1 December 1884. It served a rural area just south of Dannevirke, in the Manawatū-Whanganui region. The station closed 97 years later. In 1889 it exchanged names with its neighbouring station, to become Tamaki siding, and in 1929 became Tapuata A single track runs through the station site.

== History ==
The area was part of the Ngāti Raukawa rohe. Tahoraite was in the Seventy Mile bush. Contracts to clear a 66 ft (20 m) wide line, for what later became SH2, were let in 1871.

=== Construction ===
In 1879 some 10 mi (16 km) of the line from about 2 mi (3.2 km) north of Piripiri to Oringi was surveyed. A Royal Commissioner reported adversely on the Napier line extension to Woodville, which stopped until the end of 1881, except for a few short lengths for unemployment relief just before the 1881 election. Joseph Jay & Henry James Haines won the Kopua to Tahoraiti contract for £13,615 on 8 June 1883, but they claimed unusually bad weather caused them to fail and the Government took over. The Public Works Department (PWD) engineer was J. T. Carr, assisted by J. Fulton, H. F. Moody and D. Ross, the bridge contractors were Proudfoot & McKay, Dunedin, Joseph Saunders, Wellington and H. M'Kenzie & Co, Dunedin. D Glendinning, Napier, was the permanent way contractor. Although the line to Tahoraiti was reported as ready to open on 1 December, it was a fortnight later, on 15 December 1884 that the 7 mi 43 ch (12.1 km) Matamau to Tahoraiti section opened. The opening excursion train carried about 500 and 4 coach loads continued to Woodville.

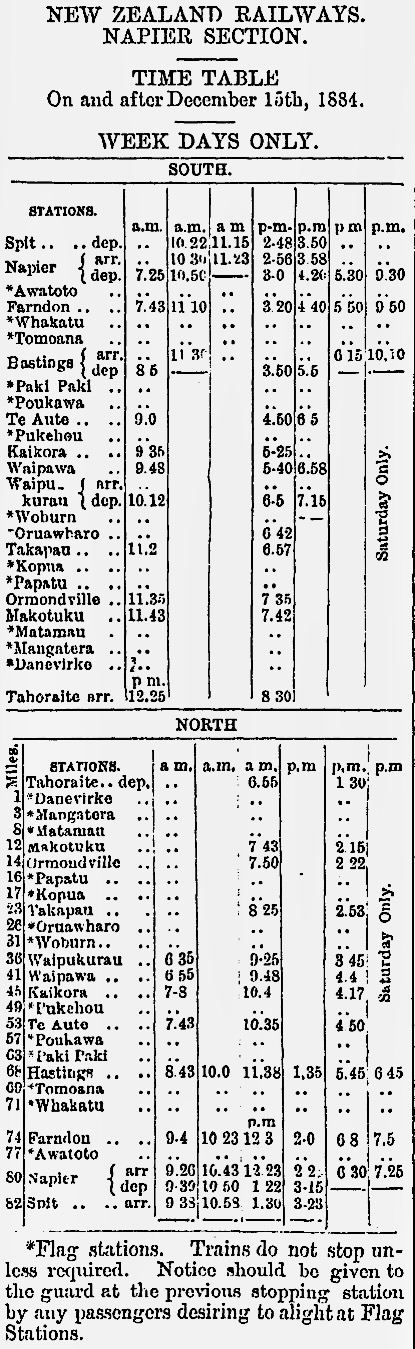
1884 Spit-Tahoraite timetable

=== Terminus 1884-87 ===
The contract for station buildings went to Alexander & McFarlane for £2,710.8s on 1 December 1883, with an extra £516.9s in March 1884. The second contract was completed by 29 August 1884. The work included workmen's cottages, engine-house, goods shed, stationmaster's house and waiting, telegraph/post, lamp and engine-driver's rooms. The mud road to station was also metalled. £108.2.6 was spent on furniture and fittings. In 1886 the stationmaster was moved to Canterbury and replaced by one from Riverton / Aparima.

In February 1885 Tamaki Timber Co applied to have a tramway at Tahoraite. By December 1885 Wilding & Co had leased the tramway. Tamaki Siding was closed as a public siding in 1888, H Carlson & Co and Tamaki Saw Mill Co then being the owners of the private sidings. but from Monday 27 August 1894, it again became a public siding, handling firewood and fencing timber.

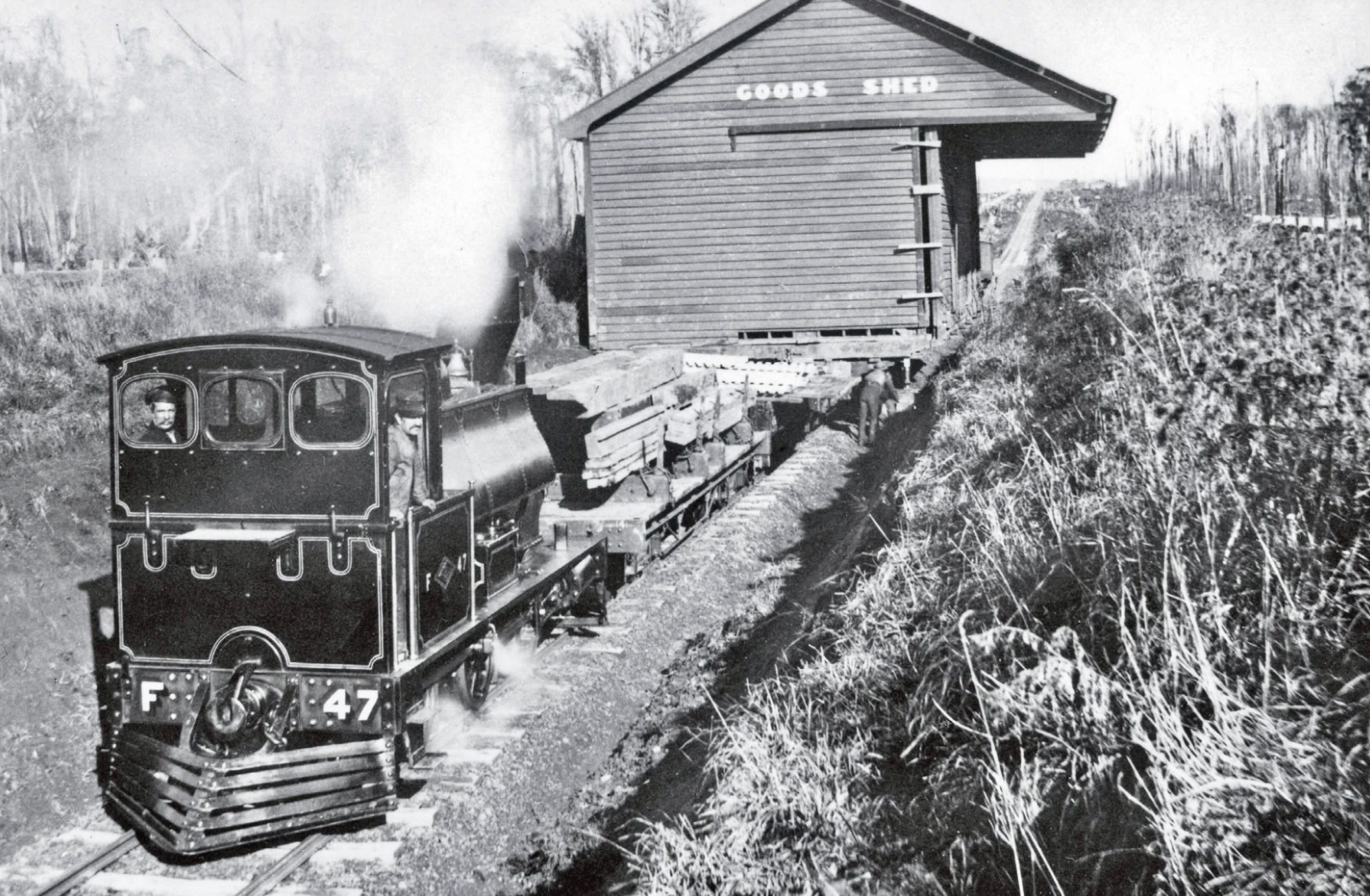
Tahoraite goods shed being moved to Danevirke on Sunday 29 May 1887

The line south to Woodville opened on 22 March 1887 and the goods shed and other buildings were then moved from Tahoraiti to Dannevirke. On 23 June 1887 it was reported that, "The station-building was successfully brought away from the bleak plains of Tahoraite last Sunday and snugly deposited on its future site in Danevirke, namely where the flag station used to be." They were signed off on 30 June 1887 and from Monday, 13 June 1887, Tahoraiti became a flag station and Dannevirke a booking station, with stationmaster, though the moves of the stationmaster's house and a store were reported in July 1887. In 1888 the cattle yards were moved to Oringi. In 1896 it was reported that Tamaki siding had a shelter shed, passenger platform, urinals and a passing loop for 26 wagons, but later reports didn't mention the shelter.

The station had 2 trains a day each way from its opening in 1884 until 1892, when it gained an extra train each way. From July 1895 express trains began to stop at the station, until 1917, when the mail train was speeded up.

=== 1889 exchange of names ===
In February 1889 a petition asked for exchange of the names of Tamaki and Tahoraiti stations. From Friday 5 April 1889 Tahoraiti siding became Tamaki Sawmill Company's siding and from 8 April Tamaki station became Tahoraiti. Tahoraiti has been an official name since 1939.

=== Stockyards ===
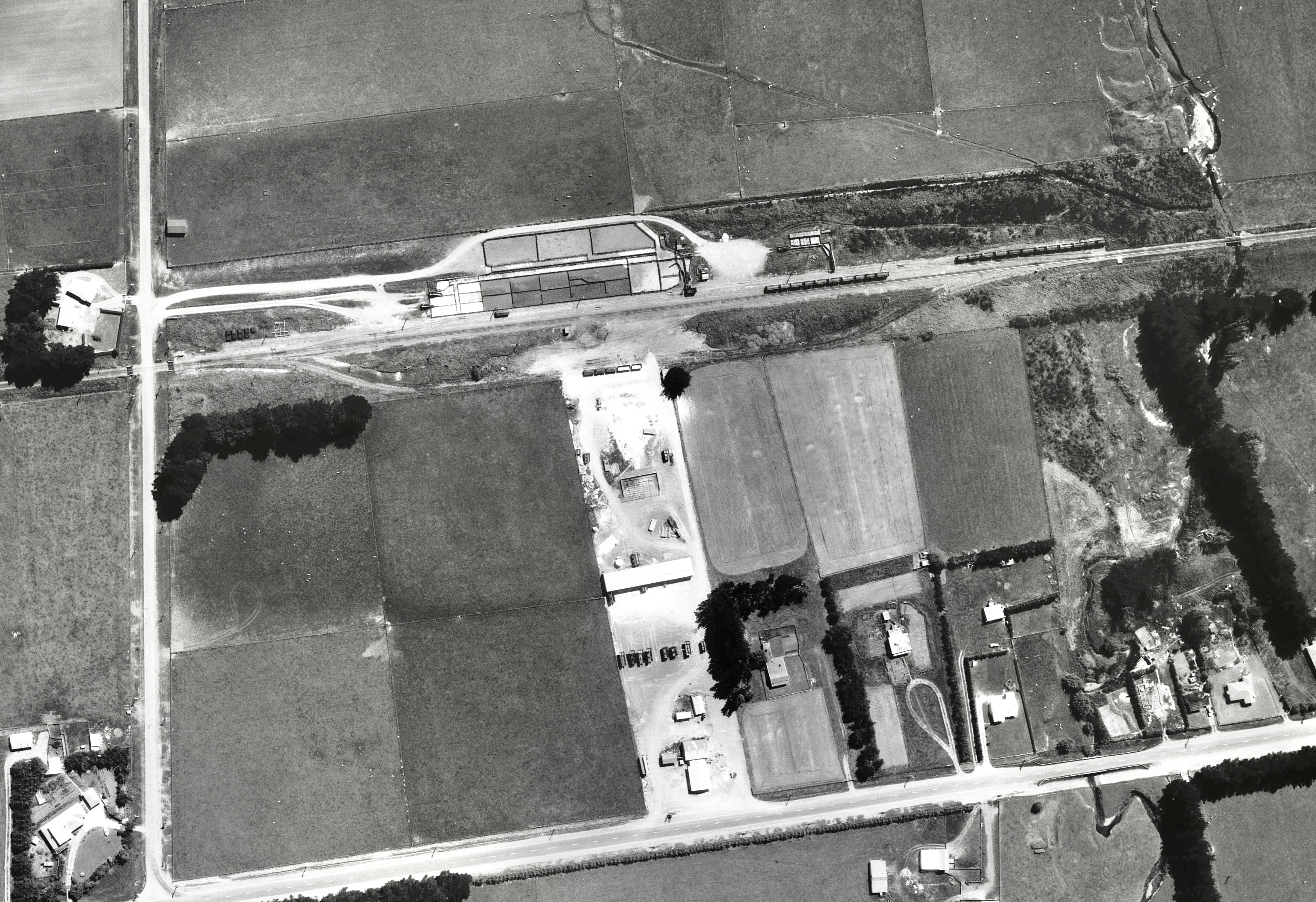
Tapuata railway station in 1962

From 17 December 1895 the cattle yards were moved to Mangatera and the sheep yards from 15 January 1896. Dannevirke residents objected to sheep being driven through their town, and a plan was made for new cattle and sheep yards. However, a new road from Weber to Mangatera bypassed Dannevirke and Gear Meat Co wanted to use Mangatera, as there was no accommodation for stockmen at Tamaki. A 1907 request by Wellington Meat Export Company for yards was declined. Later, cattle yards costing £2,400 (road approaches £200, sidings £1,400, stockyards £800) were built by 26 May 1925. In 1926 a temporary acetylene plant provided light for the yards, pending installation of electric light. The stockyards approach was altered in 1930 and on 5 August 1937 NZR's district traffic manager and assistant engineer met Southern Hawke’s Bay Auctioneers’ Association and other stock buyers and agreed to add a telephone and to concrete the 2 big cattle yards, improve drainage, divide the sheep pens into 6 compartments, for £60, and provide lavatories for £6. In the year to 14 October 1939 Tapuata received 6,725 sheep, 1,839 cattle, and sent away 204,851 sheep and 15,372 cattle. In 1940 the sheep yards were divided into 4 yards and the sides of the loading race close boarded. 2 yard lights were added in March 1947 and in 1948 new pig loading facilities cost £900. There were further improvements in 1958 and 1959 and in 1968 a new siding opened for washing out the stock wagons, though only 10 wagons at a time. On 26 August 1975 the wagon cleaning closed and the yards were reduced until they closed on 30 January 1981. Horses were used for shunting wagons from at least 1921. A hut for the horse shunter was erected in 1947. From 1964 a tractor was used for shunting until 1971.

From 1954 Hargreaves Lime & Fertiliser Ltd had a private siding and in 1960 the loading bank was levelled to make room to load bagged fertiliser on to lorries. In 1986 fertiliser for East Coast Farmers Fertiliser and coal for the Tui Dairy Company were still being railed in.

=== Second renaming ===
From Thursday, 17 October 1929 Tamaki siding was renamed Tapuata. A new Tamaki opened in Auckland. Marama was at one stage intended for the new Tamaki station, but it was decided on 27 May 1929 to use Tamaki and rename Tamaki Siding as Tapuata.

Railway houses were added over the years. In 1884 a stationmaster's house and cottages were fenced and £180 was required for a fifth cottage. In 1947 dwelling 32 was too near the stockyards, and was moved to Oringi, but another house was built in 1956.

On race days special trains served the nearby Dannevirke Racecourse, which was established about 1878.

Dannevirke Aerodrome, just to the south of the station, was compulsorily purchased from its Maōri owner in the late 1940s, after the Minister, Ernest Corbett, had said government wouldn't do so, but then said he had no powers to stop Dannevirke County Council.

=== Bridges ===
Between Tapuata and Tahoraite the line crosses Tamaki River on bridge 140, about 70 m (230 ft) long, which was damaged by a 1937 flood. There was also a fire on the bridge on 7 December 1933. Bridge No 142, at the north end of the yard, crosses a stream.
