= Tamaki railway station =

Defunct train station in Auckland, New Zealand

Tamaki
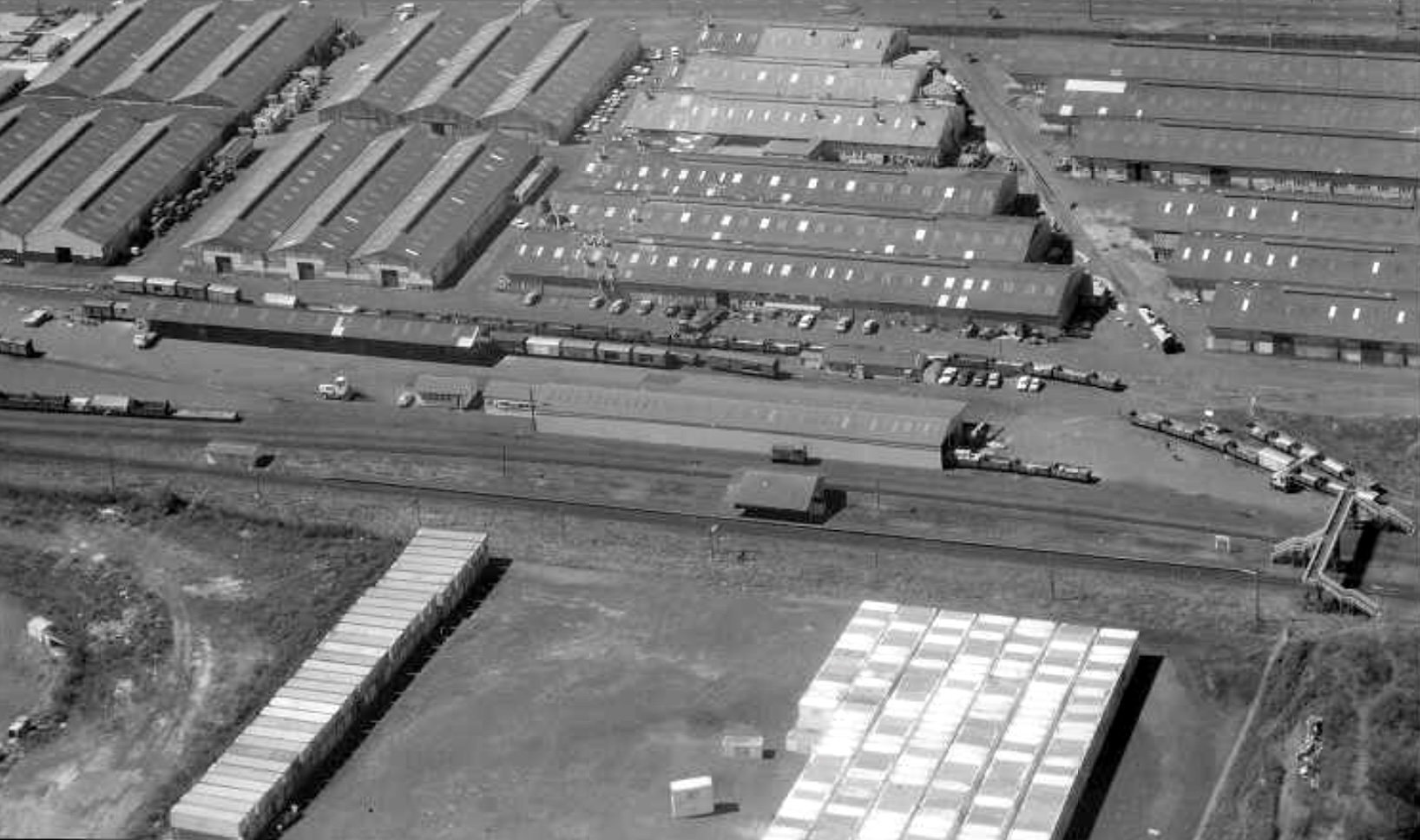
- The station in 1977

General information
- Location: Tāmaki, Auckland; New Zealand
- Coordinates: 36°53′27″S 174°51′15″E
- Elevation: 23 m (75 ft)
- Line: North Island Main Trunk
- Distance: 671.28 km (417.11 mi) from Wellington
- Platforms: Island (removed)
- Tracks: Mainline (2)

Construction
- Parking: No
- Cycle facilities: No

Other information
- Station code: TAM

History
- Opened: 16 November 1930
- Closed: 13 October 2003

Adjacent stations
Preceding station	KiwiRail	Following station
Glen Innes	North Island Main Trunk	Panmure
Location

Tamaki railway station was a station serving Tāmaki, on Auckland's Eastern Line in New Zealand, from 1930 to 2003.

A station at Tāmaki was first mentioned in March 1920, when the site was described as, "in the middle of open grass with hardly a house within half a mile". It was to be called Marama, until on 27 May 1929 it was decided to call it Tamaki and, to avoid confusion, rename Tamaki Siding, near Dannevirke, as Tapuata.

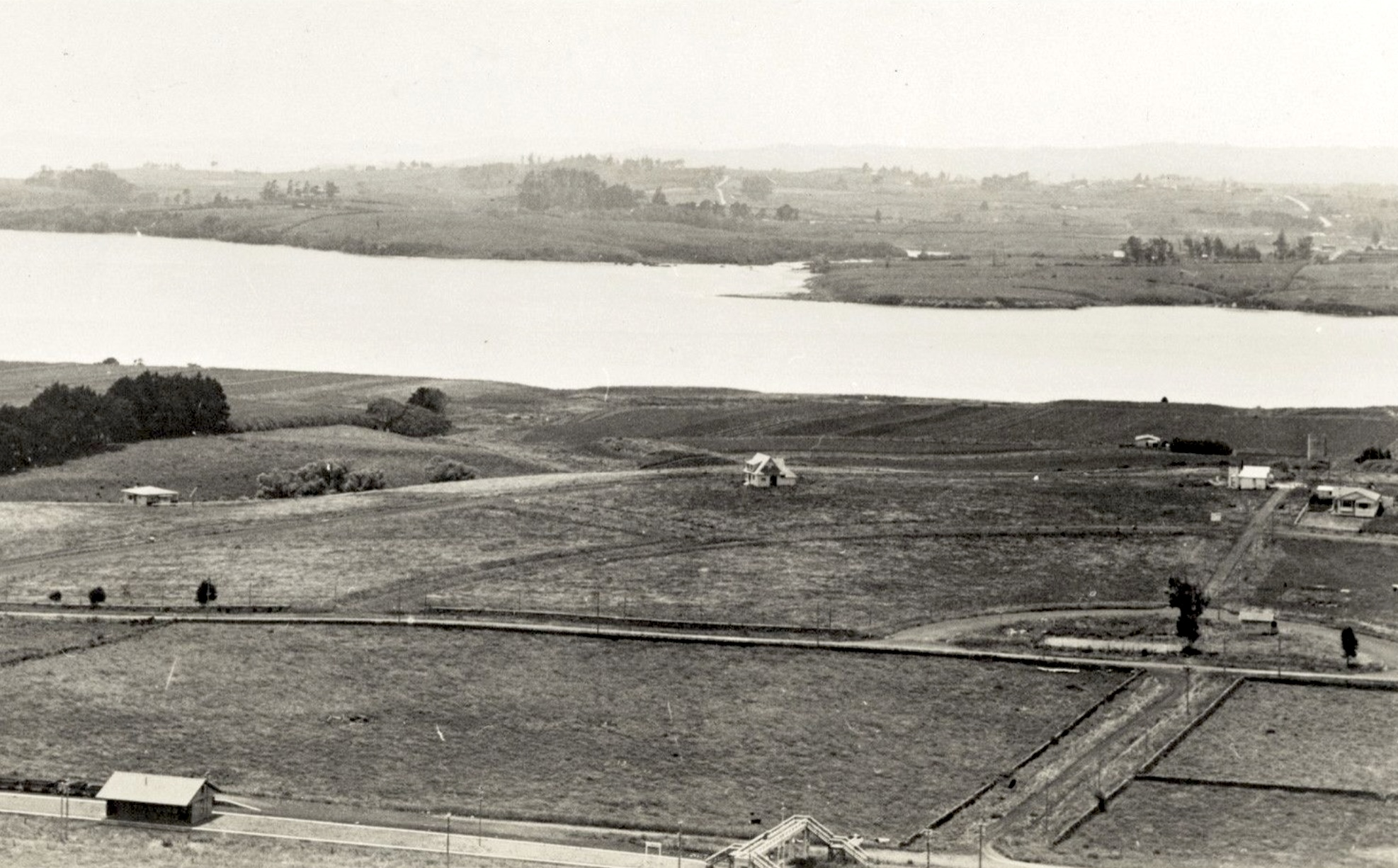
Tamaki in 1930 - station in the foreground

From November 1928 J W Bambury Ltd, of Auckland, built a wooden station with a tiled roof. By 6 May 1930 it was ready for goods traffic, with an island platform, loading bank and a 31 wagon siding. It opened to passengers on Sunday 16 November 1930. In 1926 it was 6 mi 46 ch (10.6 km) from the Britomart terminus and in 1943 5 mi 71 ch (9.5 km) from the 1930 Auckland terminal.

Footbridge No 12 was at the Westfield end of the platform, which in 1978 was 166 m (545 ft) long and 0.4 m (1 ft 4 in) high. From Monday 30 November 1959 it became an officered station, until it closed to small lots and parcels on 31 March 1983. In 1989 it was described as a low island platform with closed up station building.

Railway housing was provided after Cabinet approved 25 pre-cut houses on 3 November 1953. In 1955 46 State houses were completed.

A new goods yard opened in December 1959, with a 50 ft (15 m) x 40 ft (12 m) goods shed (50 feet by 40 feet ) and 80 ft (24 m) long loading shelter from February 1960. In 1961 a separate goods office and a store for tarpaulins, dunnage and fuel were added. On 1 August 1962 a 75 ft (23 m) extension to the goods shed was completed, with approval for another £17,500 extension of the shed on 23 November 1964, which could then take 26 wagons and the loading shelter 36 wagons. On 30 June 1965 another £63,000 of extensions and alterations to the station yard to provide for additional goods handling was authorised and on 1 February 1966 £1,200 for a 70 ft (21 m) low-level loading bank.

== See also ==
- List of Auckland railway stations
