= Oringi =

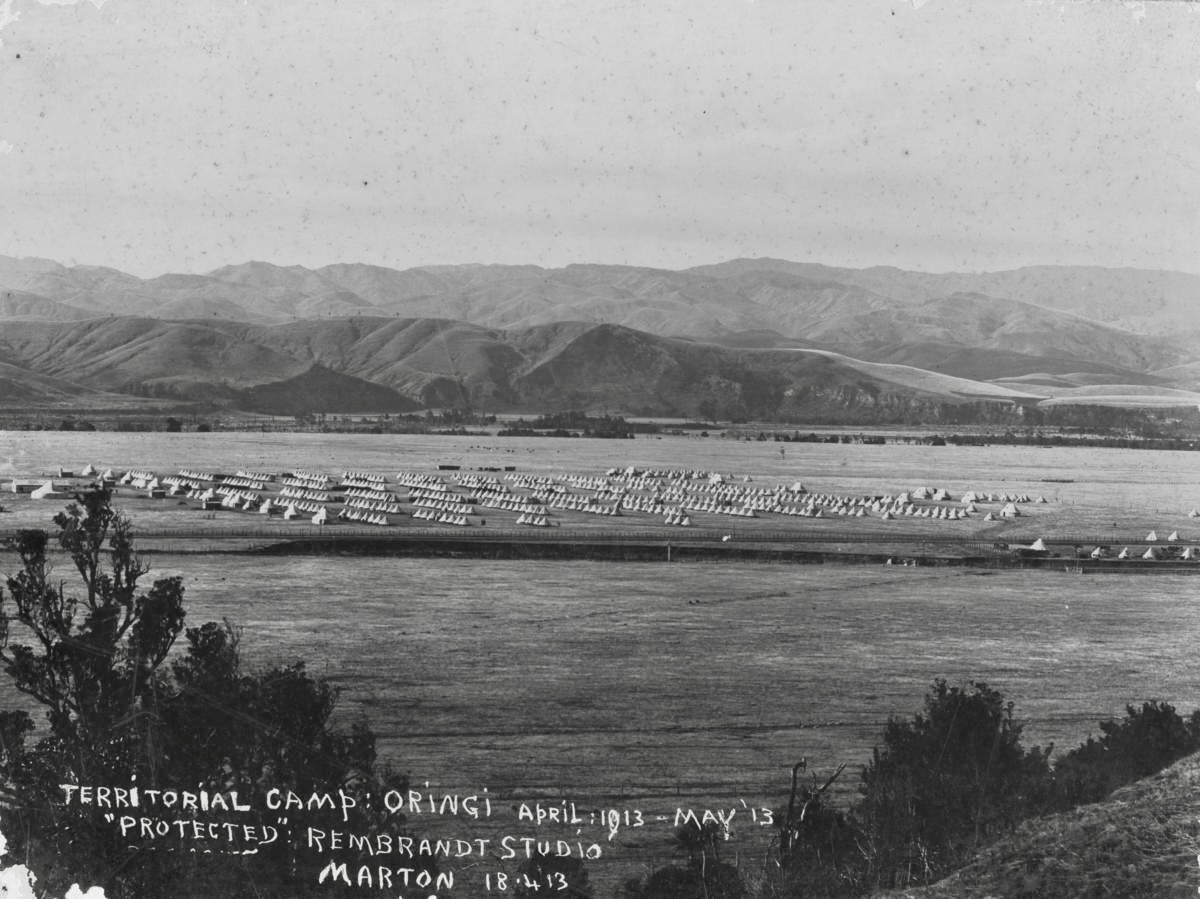
- Oringi camp in 1913, with the Ruahine Range in the background
- Interactive map of Oringi
- Coordinates: 40.260°S 176.029°E
- Country: New Zealand
- Region: Manawatū-Whanganui
- Territorial authority: Tararua District
- Ward: North Tararua General Ward; Tamaki nui-a Rua Maori Ward
- Electorates: Wairarapa; Ikaroa-Rāwhiti (Māori)

Government
  - Territorial Authority: Tararua District Council
  - Regional council: Horizons Regional Council

Area
  - Total: 30.01 km^{2} (11.59 sq mi)

Population (2023 census)
  - Total: 177
  - Density: 5.90/km^{2} (15.3/sq mi)
- Postcode(s): 4930

Oringi is a small village on State Highway 2 and the Palmerston North–Gisborne line, in a rural area south of Dannevirke, in the Manawatū River valley, of the Manawatū-Whanganui region, with 177 people (2023 census) scattered over a 30 km^{2} (12 sq mi) area. A PPCS slaughterhouse closed in 2008, due to a reduction in sheep farming. The 57 ha (140 acres) freezing works closure caused 466 job losses. The works has been converted to a business park for Scanpower (Tararua's electricity distribution business) and other companies, employing about 200. Fonterra's (until 2001 Kiwi Co-operative Dairies) milk factory closed in January 2015, when production was transferred to its enlarged Pahiatua factory. The factory was demolished in 2016.

== History ==
The area was part of the Ngāti Raukawa rohe. Its name had an origin with a besieged pa. A young woman there was admired by one of the attackers, Takaringi (or Takarangi), who gave water to the young woman, ending the conflict. The spring where he got the water was named Ko te Puna Ringi (The spring of Ringi), possibly a pun, as Oringi has the same meaning as Orini.

Oringi was a clearing near the south end of the Seventy Mile bush. Contracts to clear a line, 66 ft (20 m) wide for what later became SH2, were let in 1871. The road reached Oringi by January 1874.

The 17,000 acres (6,900 ha) Oringi estate was leased, or bought, by Henry Gaisford in 1871, or 1874. He farmed, wheat, oats and about 5,200 sheep on it. A steam powered flour mill was started in 1884. He also leased Oringi Reserve from 1888. 516 acres (209 ha) were sold in 1903 for small farms. A further 341 acres (138 ha) were sold to ex servicemen in 1948.

There was a creamery from about 1905, which became a butter producing dairy factory in 1908. By 1918 there was a large cheese factory. In 1922 more frequent trains were provided for carrying cheese, which also came from Tamaki Co-operative Dairy Co at Te Rehunga. From 1997, until the 2015 closure, trains carried milk from Oringi for processing at Hāwera.

Military training camps were held on the north side of Oringi from 1909 to 1913, after which the camp was moved to Takapau, possibly due to the compensation paid to farmers in 1913. In 1913 a railway siding was extended to hold up to 30 wagons and a loading bank for horses was lengthened by 40 ft (12 m), as the Defence Department planned larger Brigade Camps at Oringi.

The sheep freezing works opened in October 1981, for Pacific Freezing (NZ) Ltd, at a cost of $22m.

Oringi railway station
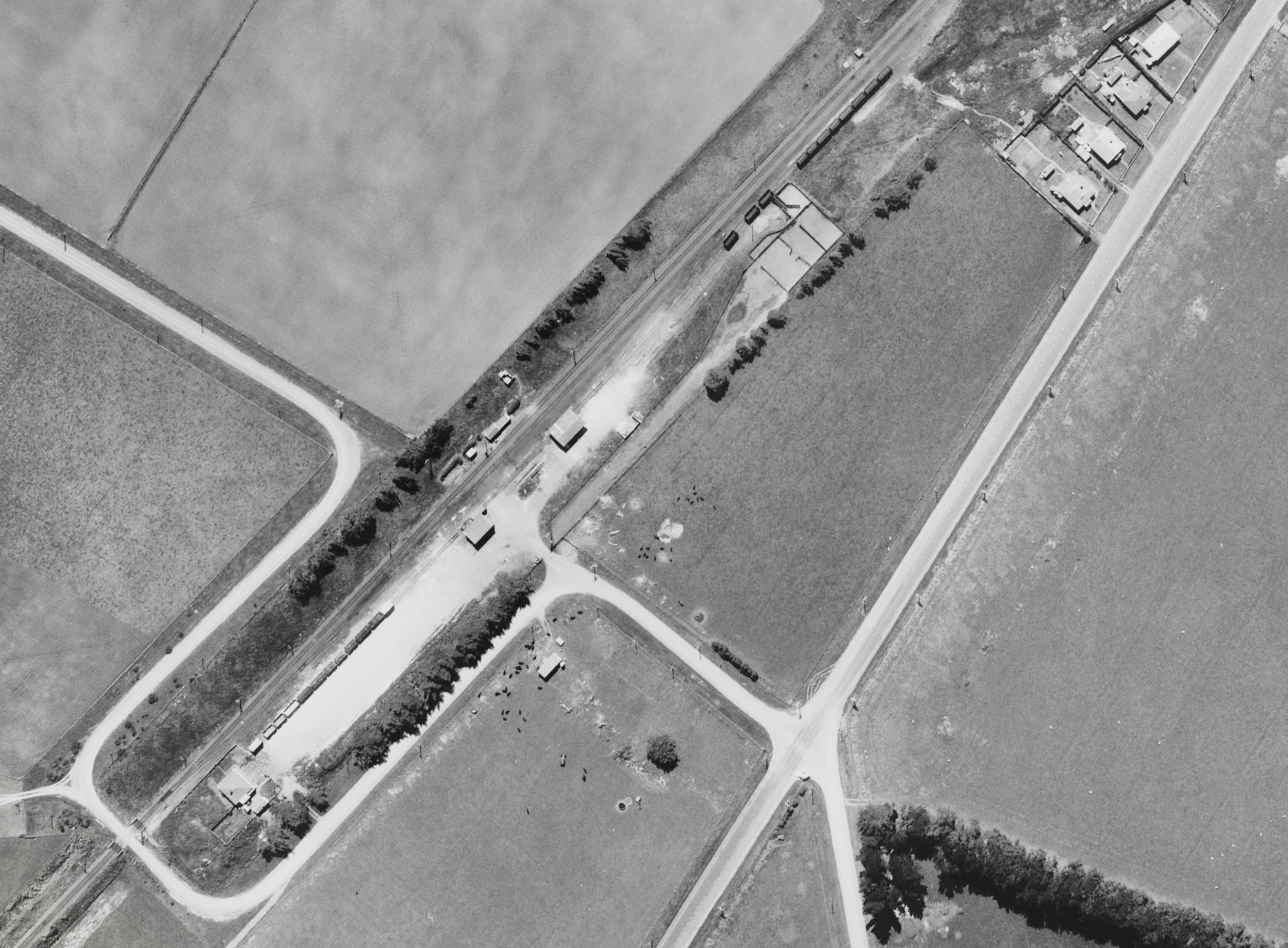
- Oringi in 1962

General information
- Coordinates: 40°15′46″S 176°01′28″E
- Elevation: 165 m (541 ft)
- Owner: KiwiRail
- Line: Palmerston North–Gisborne Line
- Distance: Palmerston North 47.24 km (29.35 mi)

History
- Opened: 22 March 1887
- Closed: 27 September 1981

Services
Preceding station	Historical railways	Following station
Maharahara; Line open, station closed 3.49 km (2.17 mi) towards PN	Palmerston North–Gisborne Line; KiwiRail	Tahoraiti; Line open, station closed 4.34 km (2.70 mi) towards Napier
Location

=== Railway station ===
Oringi railway station opened on 22 March 1887 and closed on 27 September 1981, though milk continued to be carried from the dairy factory until its closure in January 2015. The branch to the factory has since been lifted, but a passing loop and a loading ramp remain at the station site.

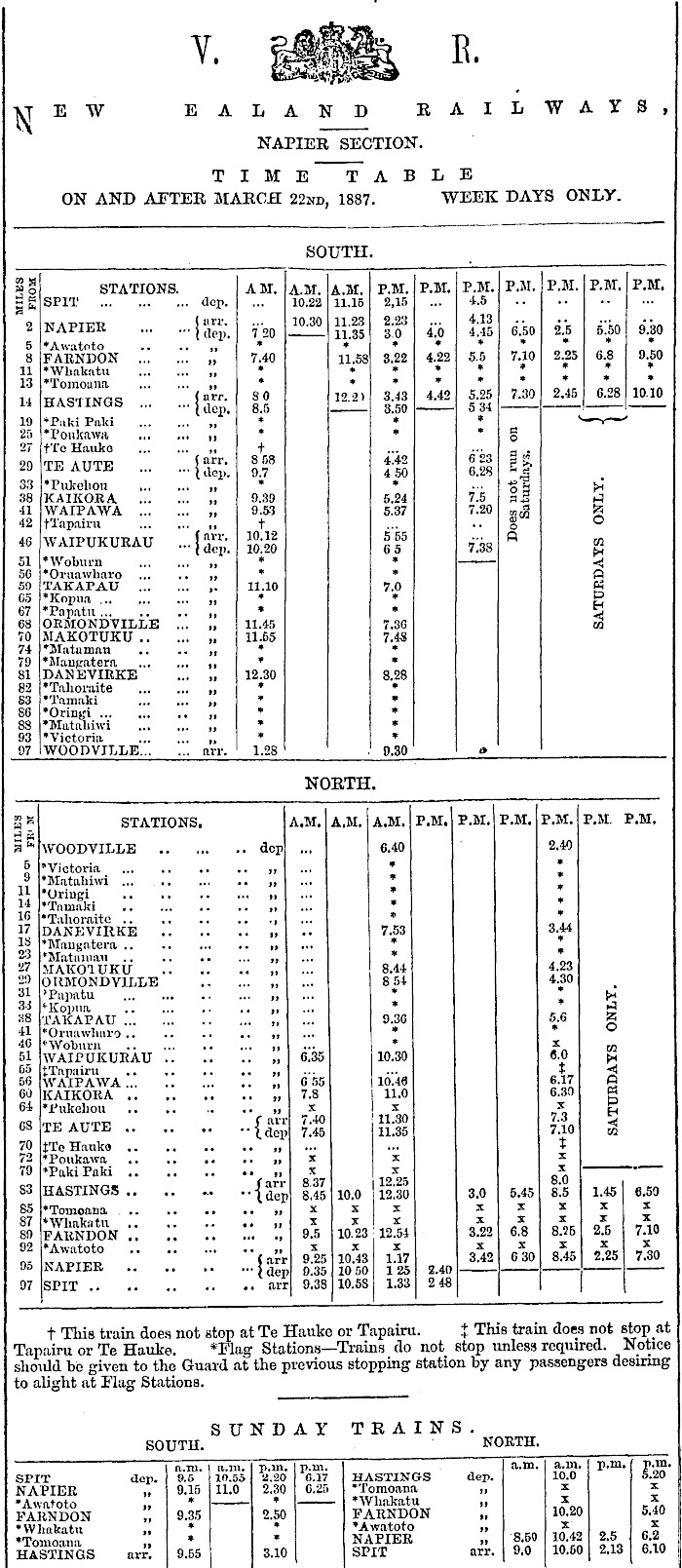
1887 timetable

==== History ====
By 1879 10 mi (16 km) south to Oringi was being surveyed and the line beyond was being explored and contoured. However, a Royal Commissioner reported adversely on the Napier line extension to Woodville, which stopped until the end of 1881, except for a few short lengths for unemployment relief just before the 1881 election. Therefore it wasn't until October 1886 that Mullinger and Brett extended the rails beyond Oringi.

Oringi station opened as a flag station on 22 March 1887, with the 15 mi 10 ch (24.3 km) Tahoraiti (later Tapuata) to Woodville section. It started with 2 trains a day, which were still running in 1891.

A shelter shed and 30 ft (9.1 m) x 15 ft (4.6 m) goods shed were built in 1886 and by 1896 there was also a platform, urinals and a passing loop for 26 wagons. In 1898 the loop was for 33 wagons and further lengthened in 1939 to 80 wagons. By 1909 there was also a loading-bank.

Sawmills were set up as soon as the line opened. From 1902, or another source says 1899, Palmerston North Sash & Door Co had a tramway from their Kiritaki sawmill, along Sturdy Rd (now Kiritaki Rd). It was dismantled in 1908. Matai, rimu and totara were the main timbers cut at the mill. It closed in 1906. Totara Sawmill Co. had a private siding from 1901 to 1912.

In 1887 there was a petition for cattle yards and next year the yards at Tahoraite were moved to Oringi. In 1890 it was suggested they and the goods shed be moved to Matahiw, but that didn't happen and the yards were improved in 1940 and again in 1947. They closed on 25 February 1980 and were removed in July that year.

From 1890 J Whitaker, took ballast from a pit at Oringi. A railway house was built in 1919 and 6 more in 1949. In 1931 Dannevirke Chamber of Commerce asked NZR not to remove a telephone from the station, as it was used by dairy farmers. NZR agreed.

In 1952 a loading shelter was built at the north end of the yard by A R Morris (Morris & Longman), Woodville. A siding for bulk lime and fertiliser for Tamaki Co-op Dairy Co was added in 1955 and in 1959 a siding, lifted in 1936, reopened for Fieldair Ltd, for top-dressing fertiliser storage. Another siding opened in 1963 and the loading bank was moved south of the goods shed, with extra lighting. In 1981 a private siding to Pacific Freezing (NZ) Ltd's works opened and the yard was modified to hold 75 class UK container wagons, and 2 other sidings to hold 25 wagons each.

==== Bridges ====
Bridge 136, over a stream almost a kilometre south of Oringi, is 15.123 m (49.62 ft) long, bridge 136A, (SH 2 crossing of the railway, just north of the station, which replaced a level crossing in 1937) is 48.753 m (159.95 ft) long and bridge 137, about a kilometre north of Oringi, over the Oruakeretaki Stream is 57.381 m (188.26 ft) long.

== Demographics ==
Oringi locality covers 30.01 km^{2} (11.59 sq mi). It is part of the larger Papatawa statistical area.

Historical population
Year	Pop.	±% p.a.
2006	165	—
2013	168	+0.26%
2018	183	+1.73%
2023	177	−0.66%

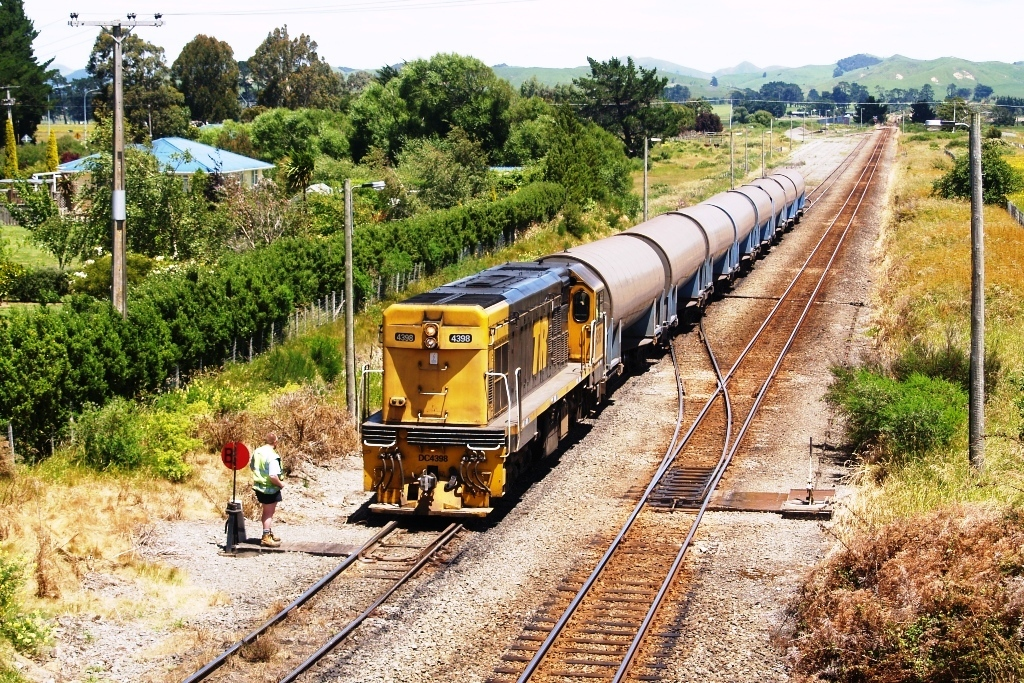
DC4398 shunts milk tanks at Oringi 11 December 2008

Oringi had a population of 177 in the 2023 New Zealand census, a decrease of 6 people (−3.3%) since the 2018 census, and an increase of 9 people (5.4%) since the 2013 census. There were 96 males and 78 females in 63 dwellings. The median age was 40.7 years (compared with 38.1 years nationally). There were 33 people (18.6%) aged under 15 years, 33 (18.6%) aged 15 to 29, 84 (47.5%) aged 30 to 64, and 24 (13.6%) aged 65 or older.

People could identify as more than one ethnicity. The results were 79.7% European (Pākehā), 30.5% Māori, 1.7% Pasifika, and 6.8% other, which includes people giving their ethnicity as "New Zealander". English was spoken by 96.6%, Māori by 6.8%, and other languages by 1.7%. No language could be spoken by 1.7% (e.g. too young to talk). The percentage of people born overseas was 10.2, compared with 28.8% nationally.

Religious affiliations were 33.9% Christian, 1.7% Māori religious beliefs, and 1.7% other religions. People who answered that they had no religion were 42.4%, and 16.9% of people did not answer the census question.

Of those at least 15 years old, 21 (14.6%) people had a bachelor's or higher degree, 87 (60.4%) had a post-high school certificate or diploma, and 36 (25.0%) people exclusively held high school qualifications. The median income was $48,300, compared with $41,500 nationally. 18 people (12.5%) earned over $100,000 compared to 12.1% nationally. The employment status of those at least 15 was 72 (50.0%) full-time, 24 (16.7%) part-time, and 3 (2.1%) unemployed.
