= Dannevirke railway station =

Railway station in New Zealand

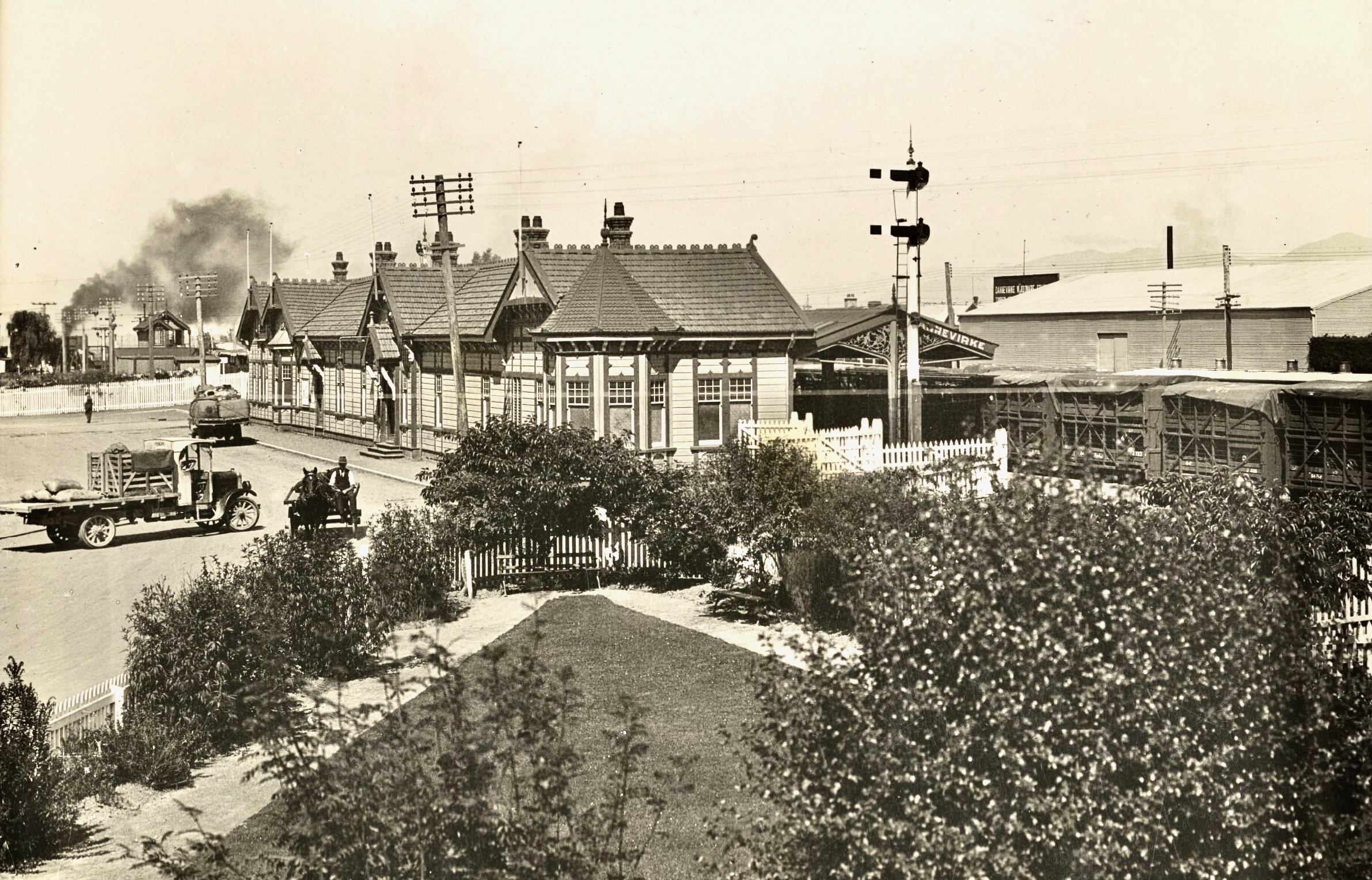
- Dannevirke railway station between erection of a picket fence in 1907 and removal of chimneys in 1911

General information
- Coordinates: 40°12′30″S 176°5′48″E
- Elevation: 207 m (679 ft)
- Owner: KiwiRail
- Line: Palmerston North–Gisborne Line
- Distance: Palmerston North 55.87 km (34.72 mi)
- Tracks: 3

History
- Opened: 15 December 1884
- Closed: passengers 7 October 2001
- Rebuilt: 1903 and 1958
- Former names: Henderson's siding until 15 December 1884; Danevirke until 13 August 1895

Services
Preceding station	Historical railways	Following station
Mangatera; Line open, station closed 2.63 km (1.63 mi) towards Napier	Palmerston North–Gisborne Line; KiwiRail	Tapuata; Line open, station closed 2.43 km (1.51 mi) towards PN
Location

Dannevirke railway station on the Palmerston North–Gisborne line of the North Island of New Zealand opened in 1884 to serve the expanding town of Danevirke. It is 124.87 km (77.59 mi) from Napier and 53.39 km (33.18 mi) from Palmerston North Junction. Its last regular passenger train was the Bay Express on 7 October 2001. It is occasionally used by excursion trains.

== History ==
Early settlers split railway sleepers, creating a 2 mi (3.2 km) long, by about 11 ft (3.4 m) high, row on the road side, so that the town was called "sleepertown". On 8 June 1883 Jay and Haynes took on a £13,615 contract to build the 8 1/4 mi (13.3 km) extension south from Matamau to Tahoraite (now Tapuata). By February 1884 they realised that they had underestimated construction costs and the work was taken on by the Public Works Department. Danevirke opened on 1 December 1884, when the 7 mi 43 ch (12.1 km) Matamau to Tahoraiti section extended the line from Napier and regular trains started running on Monday, 15 December 1884.

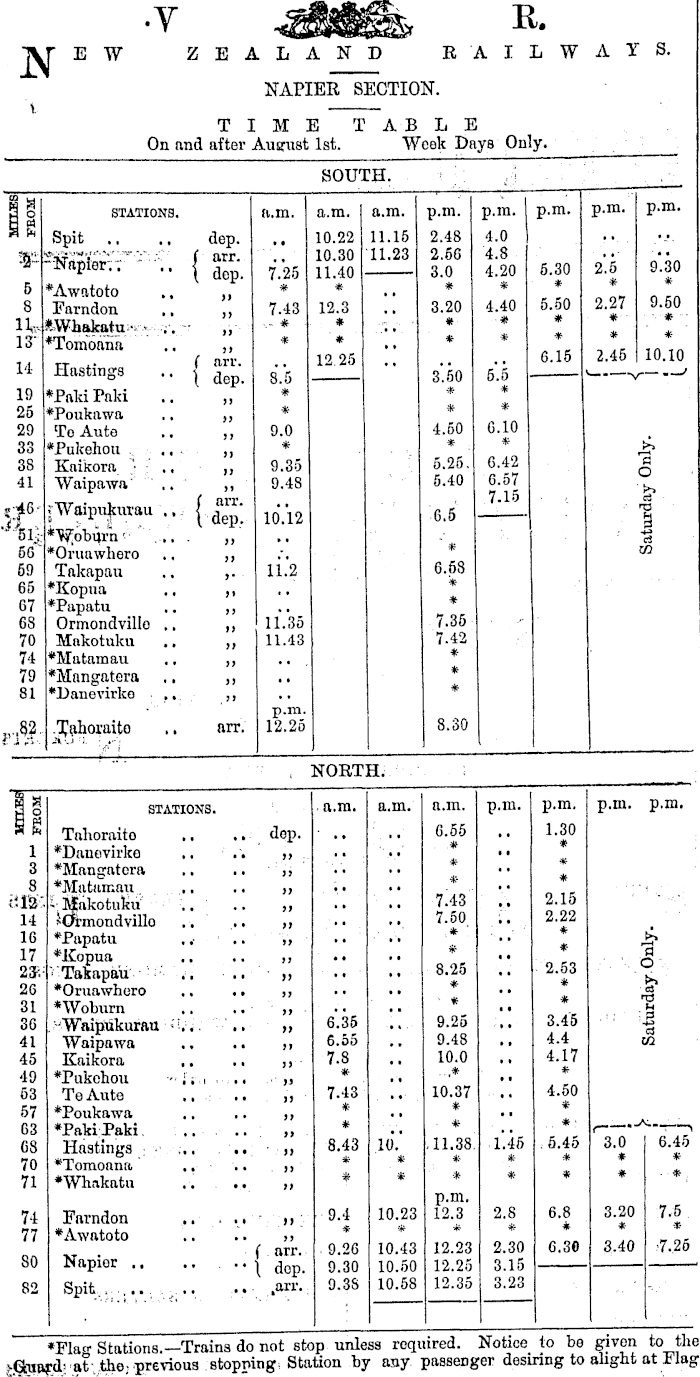
1885 Spit-Tahoraite timetable

During construction Henderson's Siding was built for Matthew Henderson (of Henderson & Wratt), who moved their sawmill to Danevirke in 1883. In 1882 J Martin offered land for a station at Danevirke and a petition was put to Parliament, but stations were only to be built at Mangatera and at Tahoraiti, which then had a post office, station, store, hotel, soap-factory and coaching stables. In July 1884 William Cowper Smith was credited with getting Henderson's Siding open for public use, though an early December 1884 report said, "after a great deal of petitioning, the people of Danevirke are actually to be granted a flag-station". The siding was soon used by more goods and passengers than Tahoraiti.

The Railway Department (NZR) took by proclamation half the width of Queen Street from Stairs Street to Princess Street for a station on the Queen Street side of the line. Dannevirke opened as a flag station on 15 December 1884, with a shelter shed and platform. The opening excursion to Tahoraite had 2 engines, 5 trucks with seats, 12 coaches and 2 brake vans. From 13 June 1887 Tahoraiti was downgraded to a flag station and Danevirke upgraded as a booking station, with stationmaster.

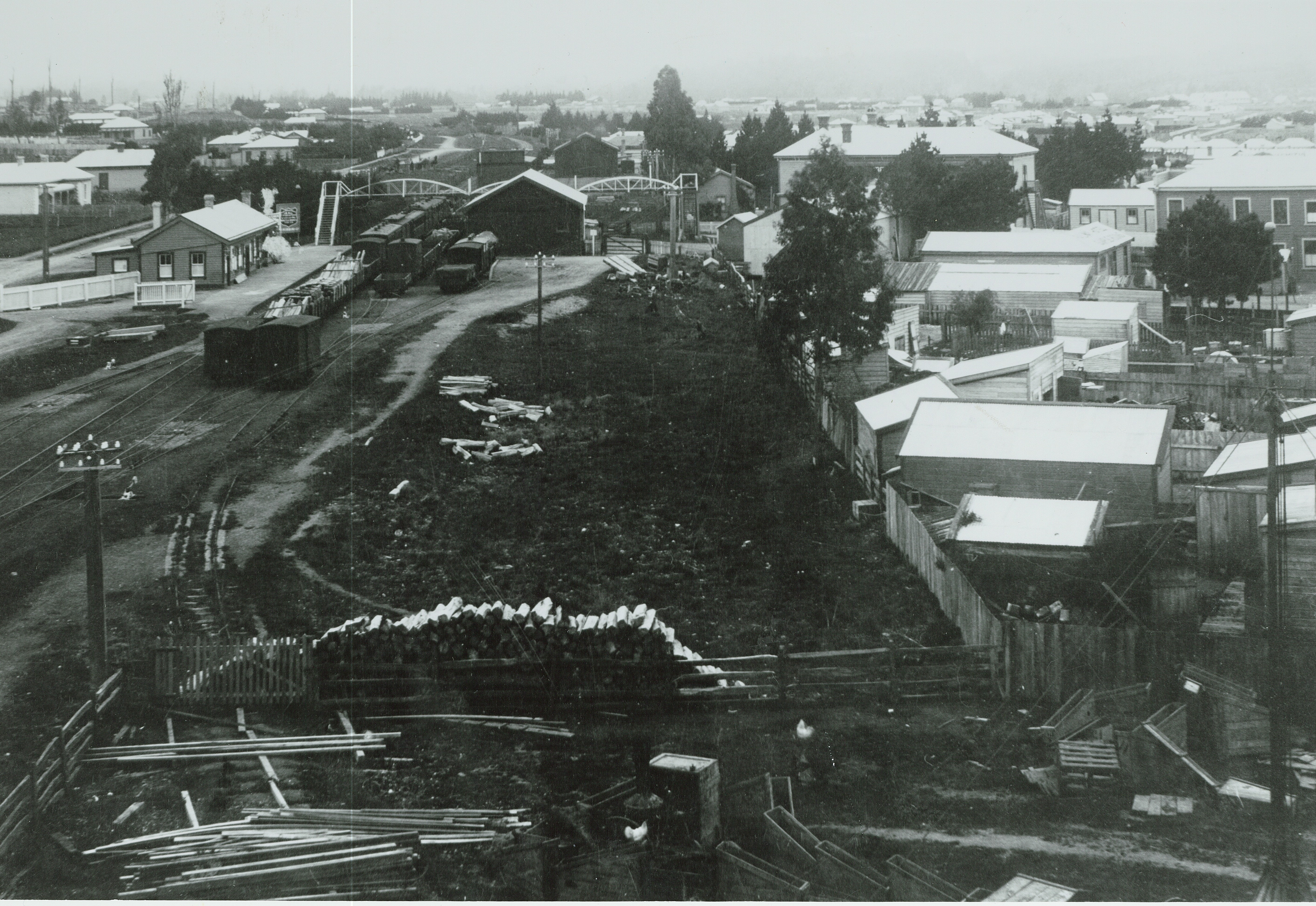
Dannevirke railway station about 1900

=== 1887 station ===
After another petition, a small, plain station building was moved from Tahoraiti to Danevirke. In 1885 it was proposed to spend £748 on the station, extra land being taken in 1887, when the stationmaster and his house moved from Tahoraiti to Danevirke, and the office was expanded in 1888, by which time it was a 4th class station with a luggage room. In 1890 the Mayor of Woodville sent a resolution passed at a public meeting, protesting about moving station buildings from Woodville to Danevirke, but the engine shed was also moved in 1891. By then there was also a platform, cart approach, 60 ft (18 m) × 30 ft (9.1 m) goods shed and water and coal supplies. In 1894 there was mention that a bookstall was at the station and then removed, though there was a bookstall from at least 1901 to 1936. In 1896 Mrs Annie Davis asked for permission to sell refreshments at the station and about 1897 gas lighting was used. By 1891 it was a 3rd class station. In 1892 it was re-arranged and in 1893 more sidings were added. In 1900 improvements were proposed. In 1901 another petition was presented to parliament, asking for a larger, more convenient building. The old station was demolished in 1903 and the stationmaster's house moved to Hatuma.

=== Turntable ===
There was a turntable by 1887 and in 1943 a 50 ft (15 m) turntable was extended to 55 ft 1 in (16.79 m). In 1950 it was noted that the track beyond the turntable could be lifted and in 1953 that the turntable hadn't been used for a year. However, it was still in place in 1959, just north of the footbridge, though very overgrown by vegetation.

=== Railway houses ===
In addition to the stationmaster's house, there were several other Railway houses. In 1892 an engine driver's house was planned, houses were added in 1922, a cottage in 1929, another house in 1948 and another in 1955.

=== Post office ===
From 1 July 1887 to 12 September 1893 there was a Post Office at the station, with telephones from 15 September 1887. It was enlarged in 1888 and 1889. The new post office opened on 12 October 1893, so possibly the railway office remained till then.

=== Renaming ===
Danevirke was renamed Dannevirke on 13 August 1895, meaning "work of the Danes", who founded the town in 1872. Danevirke was part English and part Danish. The post office name was changed on 1 January 1896.

=== 1903 station ===
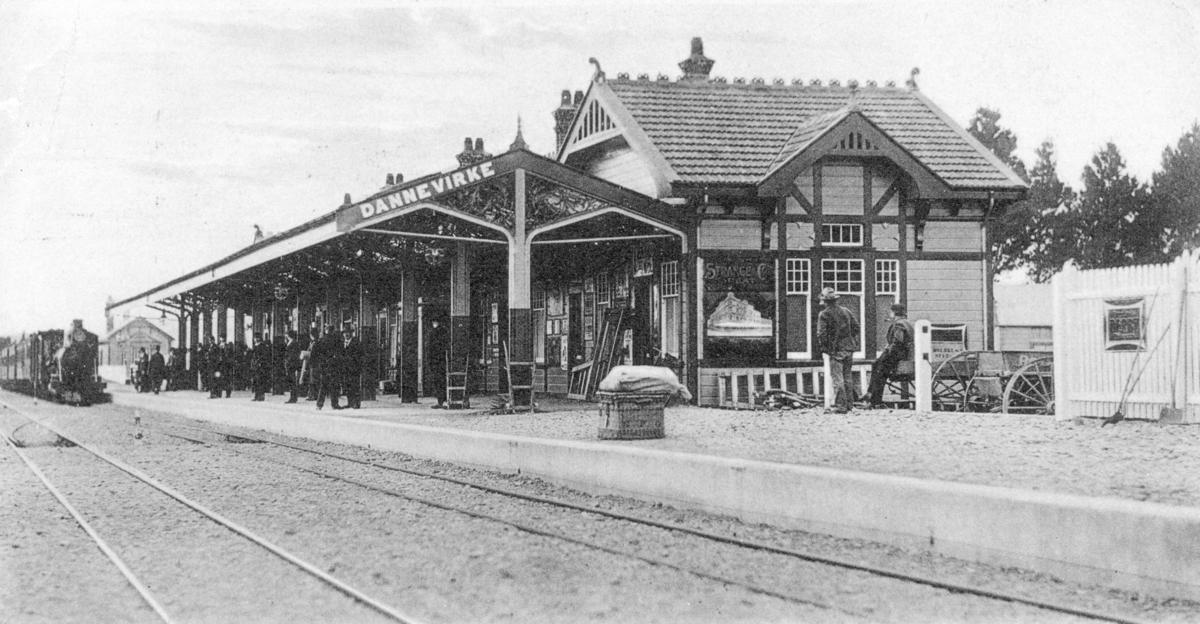
Dannevirke 1903

Work on the new station began in December 1902. It was one of the first by George Alexander Troup, following his 1902 promotion as Designing Engineer, which led to an 'age of elegance' in station buildings. Cast-iron pillars support the canopy. Brackets have an ornamental pattern of leaves and fronds, as used in later stations designed by Troup. In 1902 plans for a new building were drawn up and NZR acquired a site opposite the original station, on the town side, in 1903. The building cost £2,800, and £7,500 including sidings and other work, rather less than the £12,000 originally estimated. It was opened on Monday 31 August 1903, before a large crowd, by the Minister of Railways, Sir Joseph Ward, with local MP, Charles Hall. It was of timber, with a Marseilles tile roof, general and ladies' waiting rooms, luggage and parcels office, booking office, lobby, stationmaster's office, mail, store, porters' and lamp rooms, and canopy. The day of its official opening was declared a half-holiday in Dannevirke and, in his speech at the opening ceremony, the Minister of Railways stressed that the building 'marked the advance of time'. It was 184 ft (56 m) long, Gothic style, special station, with a 600 ft (180 m) platform, cart approach, £600, 100 ft (30 m) × 30 ft (9.1 m) goods shed, loading bank, water and coal supplies, engine turntable, engine shed (water supply cut off in 1950), fixed signals, stationmaster's house and urinals. In 1907 the rail fence around the station was replaced by a picket fence. In 1907 a 30-lever signal box, 21 ft 6 in (6.55 m) × 11 ft (3.4 m), was built about 30 yd (27 m) south of the platform to control the yard. As an earthquake precaution, chimney pots were removed in 1911. A pedestrian subway was built in 1912. In 1931 Dannevirke had a grade 4 stationmaster, goods clerk, 4 clerks, relief clerk and a cadet. An earthquake, centred nearby, caused some damage on 30 December 1938.

=== Patronage 1888-1950 ===
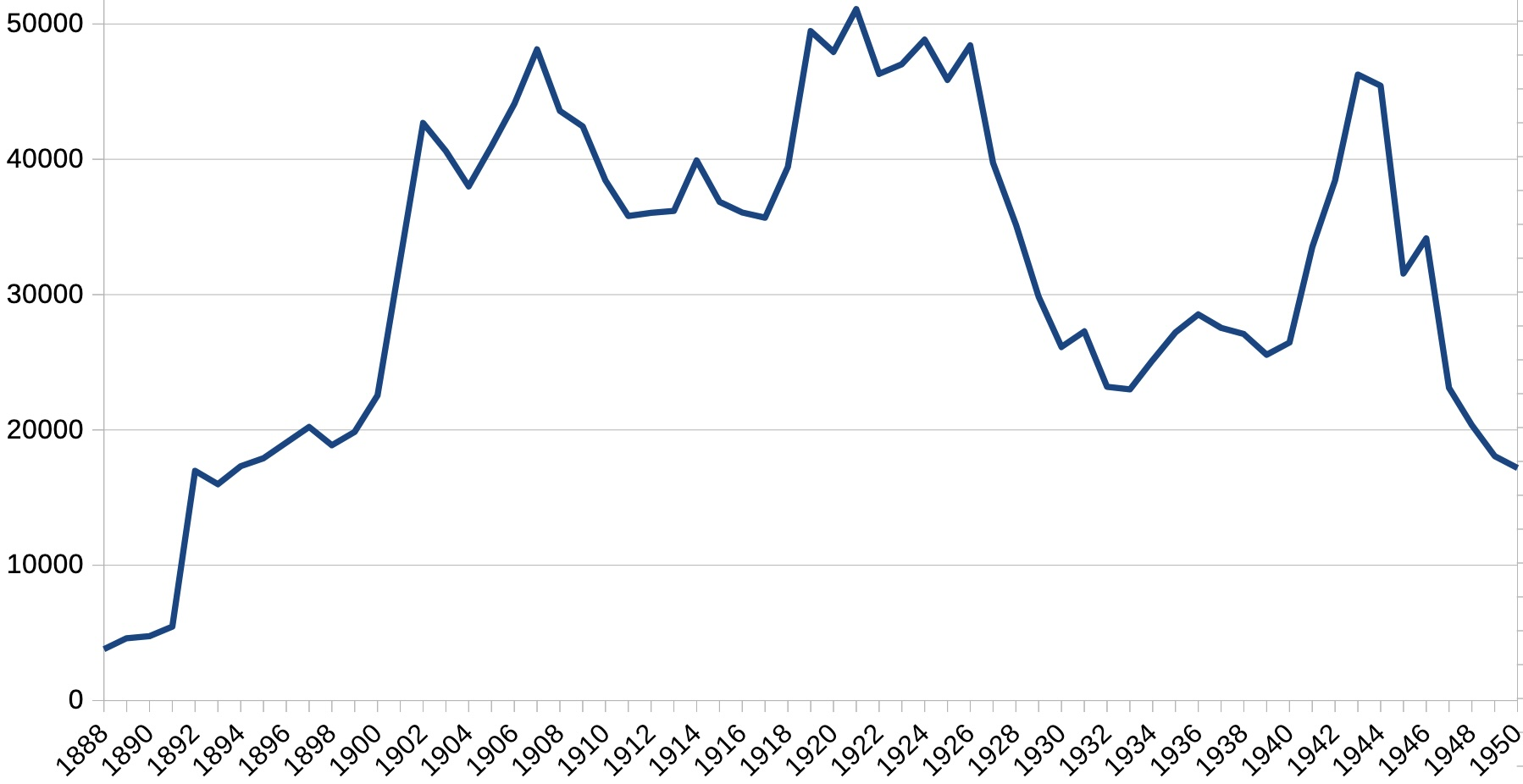
Dannevirke annual ticket sales

Until 1943 Dannevirke was the third busiest station on the line, after Napier and Hastings. It then slipped below Woodville's numbers. As shown in the table and graph below, passenger numbers peaked in 1921, when they reached about 1,000 a week -

year	tickets	season tickets	staff	Source	Title
1888	3799		2	https://paperspast.natlib.govt.nz/parliamentary/appendix-to-the-journals-of-the-house-of-representatives/1888/I/1010?large_image=true	RETURN No. 10. STATEMENT of Revenue and Expenditure of each Station for the Twelve Months ending 31st March, 1888
1889	4611	2	3	https://paperspast.natlib.govt.nz/parliamentary/appendix-to-the-journals-of-the-house-of-representatives/1889/I/1068?large_image=true	RETURN No. 10. STATEMENT of Revenue and Expenditure of each Station for the Twelve Months ending 31st March, 1889
1890	4765	7	3	https://paperspast.natlib.govt.nz/parliamentary/appendix-to-the-journals-of-the-house-of-representatives/1890/I/1064?large_image=true	RETURN No. 10. STATEMENT of Revenue and Expenditure of each Station for the Twelve Months ending 31st March, 1890
1891	5464		6	https://paperspast.natlib.govt.nz/parliamentary/appendix-to-the-journals-of-the-house-of-representatives/1891/II/1265?large_image=true	RETURN No. 10. STATEMENT of Revenue and Expenditure of each Station for the Twelve Months ending 31st March, 1891
1892	16973		8	https://paperspast.natlib.govt.nz/parliamentary/appendix-to-the-journals-of-the-house-of-representatives/1892/I/1165?large_image=true	RETURN No. 10. STATEMENT of Revenue and Expenditure of each Station for the Twelve Months ending 31st March, 1892
1893	15984		9	https://paperspast.natlib.govt.nz/parliamentary/appendix-to-the-journals-of-the-house-of-representatives/1893/I/1495?large_image=true	RETURN No. 10. STATEMENT of Revenue and Expenditure of each Station for the Twelve Months ending 31st March, 1893
1894	17318	1	8	https://paperspast.natlib.govt.nz/parliamentary/appendix-to-the-journals-of-the-house-of-representatives/1894/I/1389?large_image=true	RETURN No. 10. STATEMENT of Revenue and Expenditure of each Station for the Twelve Months ending 31st March, 1894
1895	17905	3	9	https://paperspast.natlib.govt.nz/parliamentary/appendix-to-the-journals-of-the-house-of-representatives/1895/I/1587?large_image=true	RETURN No. 10. STATEMENT of Revenue and Expenditure of each Station for the Twelve Months ending 31st March, 1895
1897	20223	26	10	https://paperspast.natlib.govt.nz/parliamentary/appendix-to-the-journals-of-the-house-of-representatives/1897/II/1611?large_image=true	RETURN No. 12. STATEMENT of Revenue and Expenditure of each Station for the Year ended 31st March, 1897
1898	18876	44	10	https://paperspast.natlib.govt.nz/parliamentary/appendix-to-the-journals-of-the-house-of-representatives/1898/I/1670?large_image=true	RETURN No. 12. STATEMENT of Revenue and Expenditure of each Station for the Year ended 31st March, 1898
1899	19858	11	13	https://paperspast.natlib.govt.nz/parliamentary/appendix-to-the-journals-of-the-house-of-representatives/1899/I/1825?large_image=true	RETURN No. 12. STATEMENT of Revenue and Expenditure of each Station for the Year ended 31st March, 1899
1900	22550	62	14	https://paperspast.natlib.govt.nz/parliamentary/appendix-to-the-journals-of-the-house-of-representatives/1900/I/1613?large_image=true	RETURN No. 12. STATEMENT of Revenue and Expenditure of each Station for the Year ended 31st March, 1900
1902	42686	107	13	https://paperspast.natlib.govt.nz/parliamentary/appendix-to-the-journals-of-the-house-of-representatives/1902/I/1437?large_image=true	RETURN No. 12. STATEMENT of Revenue and Expenditure of each Station for the Year ended 31st March, 1902
1903	40601	149	12	https://paperspast.natlib.govt.nz/parliamentary/appendix-to-the-journals-of-the-house-of-representatives/1903/I/1872?large_image=true	RETURN No. 12. STATEMENT of Revenue and Expenditure of each Station for the Year ended 31st March, 1903
1904	38001	300	16	https://paperspast.natlib.govt.nz/parliamentary/appendix-to-the-journals-of-the-house-of-representatives/1904/I/1849?large_image=true	RETURN No. 12. STATEMENT of Revenue and Expenditure of each Station for the Year ended 31st March, 1904
1905	40959	411	17	https://paperspast.natlib.govt.nz/parliamentary/appendix-to-the-journals-of-the-house-of-representatives/1905/I/3768?large_image=true	RETURN No. 12. STATEMENT of Revenue and Expenditure of each Station for the Year ended 31st March, 1905
1906	44087	338	17	https://paperspast.natlib.govt.nz/parliamentary/appendix-to-the-journals-of-the-house-of-representatives/1906/II/1601?large_image=true	RETURN No. 12. STATEMENT of Revenue and Expenditure of each Station for the Year ended 31st March, 1906
1907	48120	278	19	https://paperspast.natlib.govt.nz/parliamentary/appendix-to-the-journals-of-the-house-of-representatives/1907/I/2543?large_image=true	RETURN No. 12. STATEMENT of Revenue and Expenditure of each Station for the Year ended 31st March, 1907
1908	43571	407	19	https://paperspast.natlib.govt.nz/parliamentary/appendix-to-the-journals-of-the-house-of-representatives/1908/I/2062?large_image=true	RETURN No. 12. STATEMENT of Revenue and Expenditure of each Station for the Year ended 31st March, 1908
1909	42440	455	19	https://paperspast.natlib.govt.nz/parliamentary/appendix-to-the-journals-of-the-house-of-representatives/1909/II/1833?large_image=true	RETURN No. 12. STATEMENT of Revenue and Expenditure of each Station for the Year ended 31st March, 1909
1910	38440	471	16	https://paperspast.natlib.govt.nz/parliamentary/appendix-to-the-journals-of-the-house-of-representatives/1910/I/2051?large_image=true	RETURN No. 12. STATEMENT of Revenue and Expenditure of each Station for the Year ended 31st March, 1910
1911	35809	364	16	https://paperspast.natlib.govt.nz/parliamentary/appendix-to-the-journals-of-the-house-of-representatives/1911/I/2498?large_image=true	RETURN No. 12. STATEMENT of Revenue and Expenditure of each Station for the Year ended 31st March, 1911
1912	36038	391	16	https://paperspast.natlib.govt.nz/parliamentary/appendix-to-the-journals-of-the-house-of-representatives/1912/II/2423?large_image=true	RETURN No. 12. STATEMENT of Revenue and Expenditure of each Station for the Year ended 31st March, 1912
1913	36180	449	16	https://paperspast.natlib.govt.nz/parliamentary/appendix-to-the-journals-of-the-house-of-representatives/1913/I/3694?large_image=true	RETURN No. 12. STATEMENT of Revenue and Expenditure of each Station for the Year ended 31st March, 1913
1914	39913	453		https://paperspast.natlib.govt.nz/parliamentary/appendix-to-the-journals-of-the-house-of-representatives/1914/I/2030?large_image=true	RETURN No. 12. Statement of Revenue for each Station for the Year ended 31st March, 1914
1915	36860	496		https://paperspast.natlib.govt.nz/parliamentary/appendix-to-the-journals-of-the-house-of-representatives/1915/I/1639?large_image=true	RETURN No. 12. Statement of Revenue for each Station for the Year ended 31st March, 1915
1916	36064	497		https://paperspast.natlib.govt.nz/parliamentary/appendix-to-the-journals-of-the-house-of-representatives/1916/I/1054?large_image=true	RETURN No. 12. Statement of Revenue for each Station for the Year ended 31st March, 1916
1917	35683	515		https://paperspast.natlib.govt.nz/parliamentary/appendix-to-the-journals-of-the-house-of-representatives/1917/I/1124?large_image=true	RETURN No. 12. Statement of Revenue for each Station for the Year ended 31st March, 1917
1918	39454	481		https://paperspast.natlib.govt.nz/parliamentary/appendix-to-the-journals-of-the-house-of-representatives/1918/I-II/1160?large_image=true	RETURN No. 12. Statement of Revenue for each Station for the Year ended 31st March, 1918
1919	49474	439		https://paperspast.natlib.govt.nz/parliamentary/appendix-to-the-journals-of-the-house-of-representatives/1919/I/1232?large_image=true	RETURN No. 12. Statement of Revenue for each Station for the Year ended 31st March, 1919
1920	47938	398		https://paperspast.natlib.govt.nz/parliamentary/appendix-to-the-journals-of-the-house-of-representatives/1920/I/1350?large_image=true	RETURN No. 12. Statement of Revenue for each Station for the Year ended 31st March, 1920
1921	51094	460		https://paperspast.natlib.govt.nz/parliamentary/appendix-to-the-journals-of-the-house-of-representatives/1921/I-II/1453?large_image=true	RETURN No. 12. Statement of Revenue for each Station for the Year ended 31st March, 1921
1922	46312	352		https://paperspast.natlib.govt.nz/parliamentary/appendix-to-the-journals-of-the-house-of-representatives/1922/I/1410?large_image=true	RETURN No. 12. Statement of Revenue for each Station for the Year ended 31st March, 1922
1923	47031	274		https://paperspast.natlib.govt.nz/parliamentary/appendix-to-the-journals-of-the-house-of-representatives/1923/I-II/1322?large_image=true	RETURN No. 12. Statement of Revenue for each Station for the Year ended 31st March, 1923
1924	48843	331		https://paperspast.natlib.govt.nz/parliamentary/appendix-to-the-journals-of-the-house-of-representatives/1924/I/2459?large_image=true	RETURN No. 12. Statement of Revenue for each Station for the Year ended 31st March, 1924
1925	45868	262		https://paperspast.natlib.govt.nz/parliamentary/appendix-to-the-journals-of-the-house-of-representatives/1925/I/1805?large_image=true	RETURN No. 12. Statement of Traffic and Revenue for each Station for the Year ended 31st March, 1925
1926	48418	317		https://paperspast.natlib.govt.nz/parliamentary/appendix-to-the-journals-of-the-house-of-representatives/1926/I/1931?large_image=true	STATEMENT No. 18 Statement of Traffic and Revenue for each Station for the Year ended 31st March, 1926
1927	39722	183		https://paperspast.natlib.govt.nz/parliamentary/appendix-to-the-journals-of-the-house-of-representatives/1927/I/2231?large_image=true	STATEMENT No. 18 Statement of Traffic and Revenue for each Station for the Year ended 31st March, 1927
1928	35177	183		https://paperspast.natlib.govt.nz/parliamentary/appendix-to-the-journals-of-the-house-of-representatives/1928/I/2629?large_image=true	STATEMENT No. 18 Statement of Traffic and Revenue for each Station for the Year ended 31st March, 1928
1929	29841	261		https://paperspast.natlib.govt.nz/parliamentary/appendix-to-the-journals-of-the-house-of-representatives/1929/I/2091?large_image=true	STATEMENT No. 18 Statement of Traffic and Revenue for each Station for the Year ended 31st March, 1929
1930	26130	239		https://paperspast.natlib.govt.nz/parliamentary/appendix-to-the-journals-of-the-house-of-representatives/1930/I/2213?large_image=true	STATEMENT No. 18 Statement of Traffic and Revenue for each Station for the Year ended 31st March, 1930
1931	27282	217		https://paperspast.natlib.govt.nz/parliamentary/appendix-to-the-journals-of-the-house-of-representatives/1931/I-II/1779?large_image=true	STATEMENT No. 18 Statement of Traffic and Revenue for each Station for the Year ended 31st March, 1931
1932	23189	181		https://paperspast.natlib.govt.nz/parliamentary/appendix-to-the-journals-of-the-house-of-representatives/1932/I-II/1935?large_image=true	STATEMENT No. 18 Statement of Traffic and Revenue for each Station for the Year ended 31st March, 1932
1933	22993	162		https://paperspast.natlib.govt.nz/parliamentary/appendix-to-the-journals-of-the-house-of-representatives/1933/I/1389?large_image=true	STATEMENT No. 18 Statement of Traffic and Revenue for each Station for the Year ended 31st March, 1933
1934	25158	148		https://paperspast.natlib.govt.nz/parliamentary/appendix-to-the-journals-of-the-house-of-representatives/1934/I/2279?large_image=true	STATEMENT No. 18 Statement of Traffic and Revenue for each Station for the Year ended 31st March, 1934
1935	27203	160		https://paperspast.natlib.govt.nz/parliamentary/appendix-to-the-journals-of-the-house-of-representatives/1935/I/1327?large_image=true	STATEMENT No. 18 Statement of Traffic and Revenue for each Station for the Year ended 31st March, 1935
1936	28539	213		https://paperspast.natlib.govt.nz/parliamentary/appendix-to-the-journals-of-the-house-of-representatives/1936/I/1553?large_image=true	STATEMENT No. 18 Statement of Traffic and Revenue for each Station for the Year ended 31st March, 1936
1937	27542	214		https://paperspast.natlib.govt.nz/parliamentary/appendix-to-the-journals-of-the-house-of-representatives/1937/I/1897?large_image=true	STATEMENT No. 18 Statement of Traffic and Revenue for each Station for the Year ended 31st March, 1937
1938	27080	188		https://paperspast.natlib.govt.nz/parliamentary/appendix-to-the-journals-of-the-house-of-representatives/1938/I/1653?large_image=true	STATEMENT No. 18 Statement of Traffic and Revenue for each Station for the Year ended 31st March, 1938
1939	25559	193		https://paperspast.natlib.govt.nz/parliamentary/appendix-to-the-journals-of-the-house-of-representatives/1939/I/1971?large_image=true	STATEMENT No. 18 Statement of Traffic and Revenue for each Station for the Year ended 31st March, 1939
1940	26458	164		https://paperspast.natlib.govt.nz/parliamentary/appendix-to-the-journals-of-the-house-of-representatives/1940/I/1315?large_image=true	STATEMENT No. 18 Statement of Traffic and Revenue for each Station for the Year ended 31st March, 1940
1941	33500	157		https://paperspast.natlib.govt.nz/parliamentary/appendix-to-the-journals-of-the-house-of-representatives/1941/I/1204?large_image=true	STATEMENT No. 18 Statement of Traffic and Revenue for each Station for the Year ended 31st March, 1941
1942	38438	107		https://paperspast.natlib.govt.nz/parliamentary/appendix-to-the-journals-of-the-house-of-representatives/1942/I/652?large_image=true	STATEMENT No. 18 Statement of Traffic and Revenue for each Station for the Year ended 31st March, 1942
1943	46259	105		https://paperspast.natlib.govt.nz/parliamentary/appendix-to-the-journals-of-the-house-of-representatives/1943/I/680?large_image=true	STATEMENT No. 18 Statement of Traffic and Revenue for each Station for the Year ended 31st March, 1943
1944	45433	91		https://paperspast.natlib.govt.nz/parliamentary/appendix-to-the-journals-of-the-house-of-representatives/1944/I/896?large_image=true	STATEMENT No. 18 Statement of Traffic and Revenue for each Station for the Year ended 31st March, 1944
1945	31554	84		https://paperspast.natlib.govt.nz/parliamentary/appendix-to-the-journals-of-the-house-of-representatives/1945/I/970?large_image=true	STATEMENT No. 18 Statement of Traffic and Revenue for each Station for the Year ended 31st March, 1945
1946	34159	129		https://paperspast.natlib.govt.nz/parliamentary/appendix-to-the-journals-of-the-house-of-representatives/1946/I/1549?large_image=true	STATEMENT No. 18 Statement of Traffic and Revenue for each Station for the Year ended 31st March, 1946
1947	23102	89		https://paperspast.natlib.govt.nz/parliamentary/appendix-to-the-journals-of-the-house-of-representatives/1947/I/2496?large_image=true	STATEMENT No. 18 Statement of Traffic and Revenue for each Station for the Year ended 31st March, 1947
1948	20361	85		https://paperspast.natlib.govt.nz/parliamentary/appendix-to-the-journals-of-the-house-of-representatives/1948/I/2522?large_image=true	STATEMENT No. 18 Statement of Traffic and Revenue for each Station for the Year ended 31st March, 1948
1949	18064	88		https://paperspast.natlib.govt.nz/parliamentary/appendix-to-the-journals-of-the-house-of-representatives/1949/I/2105?large_image=true	STATEMENT No. 18 Statement of Traffic and Revenue for each Station for the Year ended 31st March, 1949
1950	17189	66		https://paperspast.natlib.govt.nz/parliamentary/appendix-to-the-journals-of-the-house-of-representatives/1950/I/2367?large_image=true	STATEMENT No. 18 Statement of Traffic and Revenue for each Station for the Year ended 31st March, 1950

=== 1983 station ===
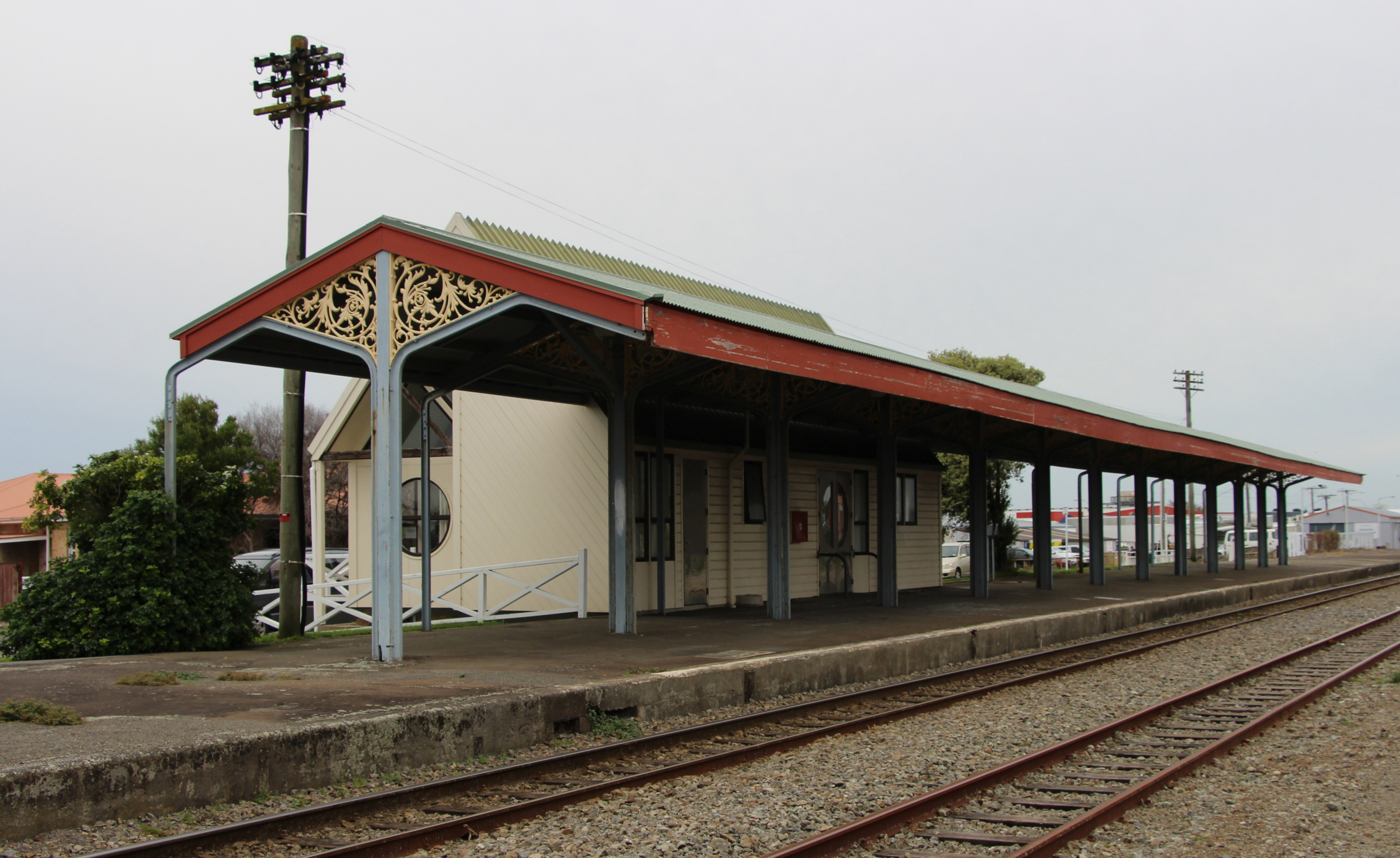
Railway station canopy and 1983 station in 2016

In 1966 a railcar caught fire near the station and 67 passengers had to complete their journey to Napier by bus. In 1958 and 1983 upgrades were shelved and in 1962 demolition was planned, but delayed to 1983, when a much smaller station building replaced it. Only the canopy was retained. The station office closed in 1990 and was 'for lease' in 1993. In 1984 the station building, low level platform, goods shed and a loading shelter remained. In 1987 wind damaged the velocipede shed. The station closed to goods on 31 August 1985 and the shed was demolished in 1989. The 1983 station, concrete platform, sidings, 1903 verandah (or canopy) and a passing loop remain. The verandah has been protected by Category 2 listing 4415 since 28 June 1990. In 2002 it was restored by Dannevirke Host Lion's Club and its corrugated iron replaced in 2003.
