= Tahoraiti railway station =

Railway station in New Zealand

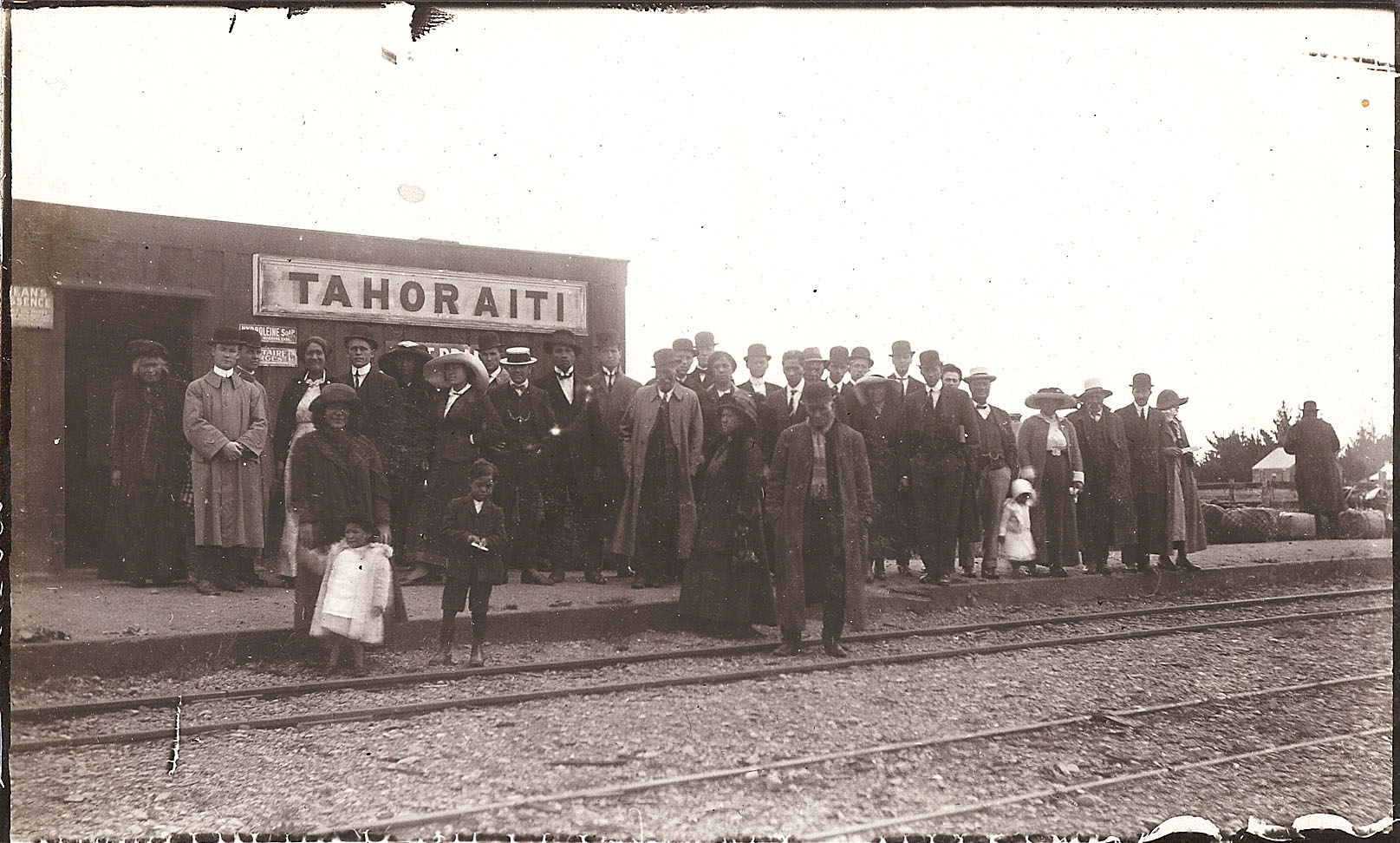
- Tahoraiti in 1912

General information
- Coordinates: 40.2331°S 176.0584°E
- Elevation: 190 m (620 ft)
- Owner: KiwiRail
- Line: Palmerston North–Gisborne Line
- Distance: Palmerston North 51.58 km (32.05 mi)

History
- Opened: 22 March 1887
- Closed: 1 February 1971
- Former names: Tamaki until 8 April 1889

Services
Preceding station	Historical railways	Following station
Oringi; Line open, station closed 4.34 km (2.70 mi)	Palmerston North–Gisborne Line; KiwiRail	Tapuata; Line open, station closed 2.43 km (1.51 mi)
Location

Tahoraiti has, since 1939, been the official name of a locality, which has also been known as Tahoraite. It is a sparsely populated area in the Manawatū-Whanganui region, with 354 people (2018 census) scattered over two meshblocks, totalling 56 km^{2} (22 sq mi). Tahoraiti had a post office from 1907 and a school from 1921.

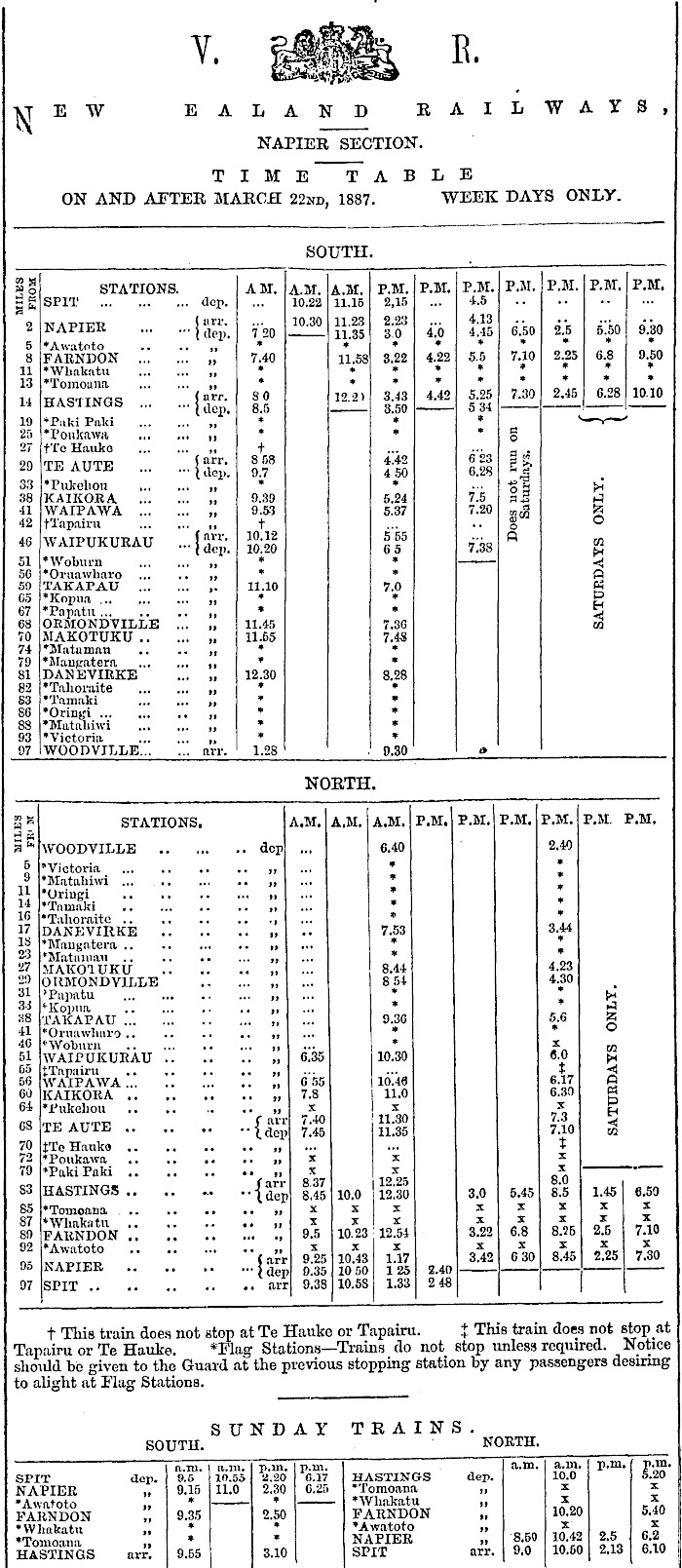
1887 opening timetable

== History ==
Tahoraite railway station opened on 22 March 1887, when the 15 mi 10 ch (24.3 km) Tahoraiti (later Tapuata) to Woodville section extended the line from Napier.

The area was part of the Ngāti Raukawa rohe in the Seventy Mile bush. Tamaki Sawmill had been set up by 1884. The equipment at the Gammon & Co sawmill was sold in 1906, though firewood was still being railed out in 1908 and H B Timber Co remained until 1910.

The contract for station buildings was signed on 24 December 1886, with additions in 1887. In 1887 E V Dixon asked for a lease of a tea and coffee stall at Tamaki station and in 1888 wanted to put up a refreshment room. By 1896 there was a shelter shed, platform, urinals and a passing loop for 26 wagons, extended to 54 wagons by 1898.

In February 1889 a petition asked for exchange of the names of Tamaki and Tahoraiti stations. From Friday 5 April 1889 Tahoraiti siding became Tamaki Sawmill Company's siding and from 8 April Tamaki station became Tahoraiti.

In 1891 a request to stop expresses was turned down, but from 1895 express trains stopped at the flag station, which still had 2 trains a day. Tablet signalling was installed in 1923,

In 1954 a railcar with 34 passengers caught fire whilst climbing from Oringi to Tahoraiti.

By 1958 the station buildings were used so little it was suggested they be used by the District Engineer as Way & Works Branch Shelter sheds. On 22 March 1970 the station closed, except for wagon loads and on 1 February 1971 it closed to all traffic. Only a single line now passes through the station site.

Bridge 139, over the Otamaraho Stream, about a kilometre south of Tahoraiti, is 27.118 m (88.97 ft) long.
