= Railways Department's Housing Scheme =

New Zealand housing programme

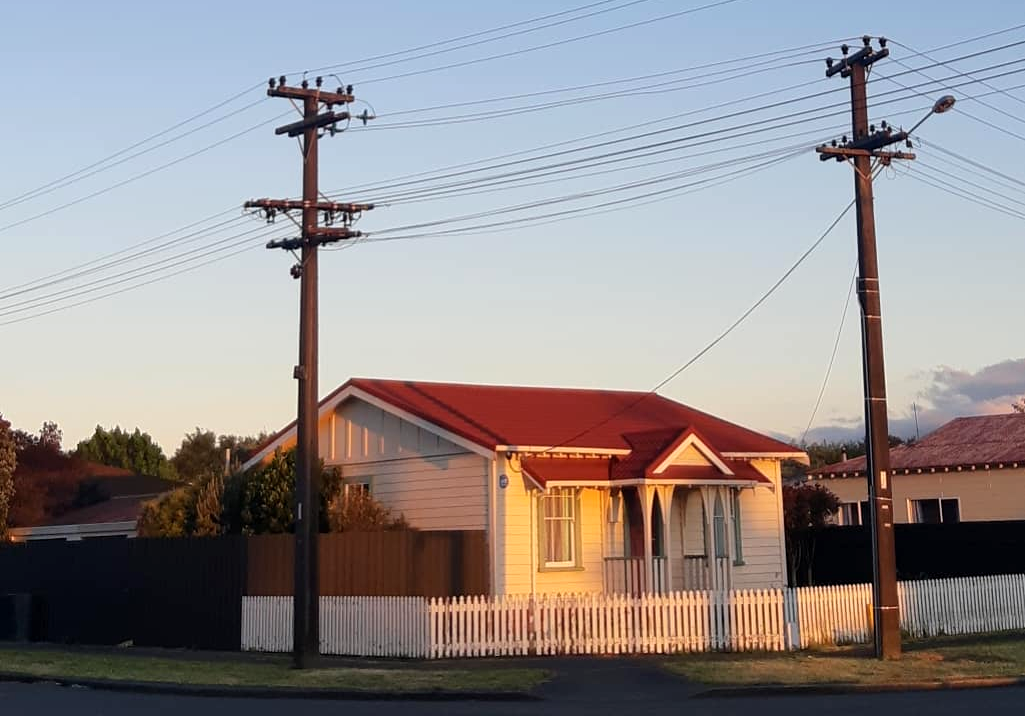
A typical style of railway house in Milson.

The Railways Department's Housing Scheme refers to a housing programme undertaken by the New Zealand Railways Department (also known as NZR or New Zealand Government Railways) during the 1920s. The scheme was intended to provide railway workers and their families with affordable and accessible accommodation during a time when it was otherwise difficult to find suitable housing.

Although the houses were generally only intended as section houses, specifically for workers of the Railways Department, some houses were provided for the general population - such as those in Lower Hutt.

The construction scheme was in effect between 1923 and 1929 and saw the construction of over 1,500 prefabricated houses throughout New Zealand.

== History ==
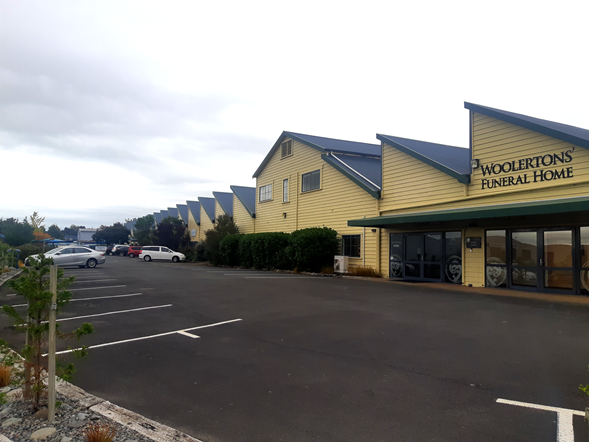
Frankton house factory, where the houses were pre-fabricated, as seen in 2021.

=== Background ===
NZR had provided housing of some sort for its workforce since the 1880s. These were often huts for the workers and small cottages for higher-ranking officials such as station masters. Privately operated railways New Zealand Midland Railway Company and the Wellington and Manawatu Railway Company had provided houses for staff as well, which were later absorbed into the Government Railways housing stock when those railways were nationalised.

This provision of houses proved insufficient following World War I, where a growing population and a subsequent growing demand for housing led to large increases in rents nation-wide. Railway workers, especially those who often shifted between stations and yards, found it difficult to find and to afford housing in the new location. This posed serious staff-retention problems for the Railways.

In March 1920, the issues surrounding the lack of affordable housing led Prime Minister William Massey to grant the Railways Department its own housing scheme, which was to include 400 houses. The scheme was led by architect George Troup, who in 1919 became the officer in charge of the Architectural Branch of Railways. It followed the introduction of the Workers' Dwellings Act 1905 and the Housing Act 1919, which aimed to address the squalid conditions and high rents in working-class suburbs of New Zealand.

=== Implementation ===
The department gave effect to the scheme by preparing architectural designs for a standardised, pre-fabricated house, referred to as the 'B2 design', and established a house factory in Frankton near Hamilton to build them. The wood was to be sourced from state-owned forests, and the houses were to be sited on Railways-owned land adjacent or near existing railway stations and yards. The pre-fabricated houses would be freighted to these locations by rail. Note that most of these locations were in the North Island due to constraining shipping costs.

The rent charged for the houses was to be cheaper than the market rate, at only a days worth of pay. This led to grief from higher-ranking workers, who would have to pay comparatively more than a lower-ranked worker due to differences in daily pay.

The scheme quickly proved itself to be efficient and was expanded to become the largest-scale housing scheme in New Zealand. In total, over 1591 houses were constructed during the short period of the scheme's operations. The Railways became New Zealand's first employer to provide workers' accommodation at such a scale, and became the country's largest property developers and landlords.

The houses could be constructed in two to three weeks by just a handful of workers.

The programme affected the private housing market, where the average cost of a five-room house fell from £831 to £635. The private construction industry was threatened by this state competition and lobbied for the end of the housing scheme, arguing that private enterprise could build workers' houses more cheaply. This led to the end of the scheme, and the closure of the Frankton factory in 1929.

=== Post-1929 ===
Lessons from the Railways' housing scheme influenced the state housing scheme of the First Labour Government of New Zealand in between 1935–1949.

=== Disposal and sales ===
In 1979 NZR's general manager, Trevor Hayward, published a pamphlet titled "Time for Change" indicating that the Railways were looking at ending the provision of staff housing in all but the most isolated areas of the railway network. The pamphlet noted NZR owned 4,000 houses, most of which were over 60 years old and were in a poor state of repair. In 1982, land transport was deregulated and the Railways Department was corporatised into the New Zealand Railways Corporation, and a business group was formed within the corporation known as Rail Properties, to manage the corporation's land and housing assets. In 1983, international consultants proposed major staff cuts to make the corporation profitable, which resulted in the need for railway housing to decrease substantially.

The Rail Properties group began analysing its housing stock, and concluded selling all housing would provide the corporation with $100m in income. In July 1988, details of the sell-off were announced by Rail Properties in a booklet to all tenants entitled "Sale of Railway Houses". This outraged many tenants who would have to pay market rates and lost the security of a state landlord. In 1990, the corporation sold all of the railway houses in the town of Otira in the South Island, with a peppercorn rental paid on the land.

Some were retained by the corporation and later transferred to its successors, the last being occupied in 2012 when its tenant, at Cass on the Midland Line retired. The house itself is still owned by KiwiRail.

The Frankton Factory has been preserved and is a Heritage Listed Building. Many houses remain intact today. Over the years, many have been removed or relocated from their original locations. Some that remain have heritage status under local District Plans.

== Architecture ==
A railway cottage in Morea, Lower Hutt with a sunroom renovation on the porch.

The railway houses used standardised plans to allow for mass production and to keep the costs low. The external design was influenced by the American West Coast or California bungalow, and included Georgian façades, open eaves, and a limited variation of decorative porches, and the use of hipped, gabled or gable hipped roofs.

The standard variation of entry porches included trellised porches with hipped roofs; bungalow-styled exposed pointed rafters; gabled hips with Art Nouveau bracketed posts; Arts and Crafts shallow-hipped arches with trellised posts; or a combination of these different elements.

Street-facing windows could have hoods in the same style as the roof. These were either separate or joined to the porch roof. Windows were timber double hung sash with Queen Anne-styled multi-panes on the upper sash.

They had piled foundations, suspended timber floors, timber frames, eternal bevel-back weatherboard cladding, and sarking-lined internal walls.

The houses were typically five room family cottages consisting of three bedrooms, a sitting room and a dining room. A lean-to at the back contained a small kitchen, bathroom and laundry. The houses had a separate outhouse and coal shed.

A larger house was designed for railways officers.

== Railway settlements ==
Planned settlements and subdivisions were often laid out on railway land to accommodate the houses. The largest settlements were developed at Frankton and Moera, with smaller settlements along the railways' main trunk and secondary lines.

The initial premise of the settlements was to follow garden city principles of planning; the scheme was influenced by Samuel Hurst Seager's "garden suburb" at Sumner Spur, Christchurch (1902–1914). The settlement at Frankton is an example of this, with green spaces, well-connected streets, and community areas. As the scheme continued and the department prioritised the speed of development, these ideals became less important. This led to some developments lacking any amenities including footpaths, with the workers being told to keep their own gardens to a tidy standard to help provide the same effects as a garden suburb. Such was the case with Milson in Palmerston North, which was only provided with a community center and school after the tenants complained.

Settlements were often not connected to boroughs' service lines due to the Railways Department not paying rates to the Councils.

== Locations ==
Railway settlements and subdivisions were established in several locations including Frankton, where the factory was located, Marton, Maungaturoto, Milson, Newmarket, Ngaio, Ohakune, Otahuhu, Stratford, Taumarunui, Taihape and Welbourn, as well as in Greymouth. Moera was unusual in not directly being a railways settlement but developed as part of the provisions of the Hutt Valley Lands Settlement Act 1925.
