= Seventy Mile Bush =

Forested area in New Zealand

Coordinates: 40.448°S 176.023°E

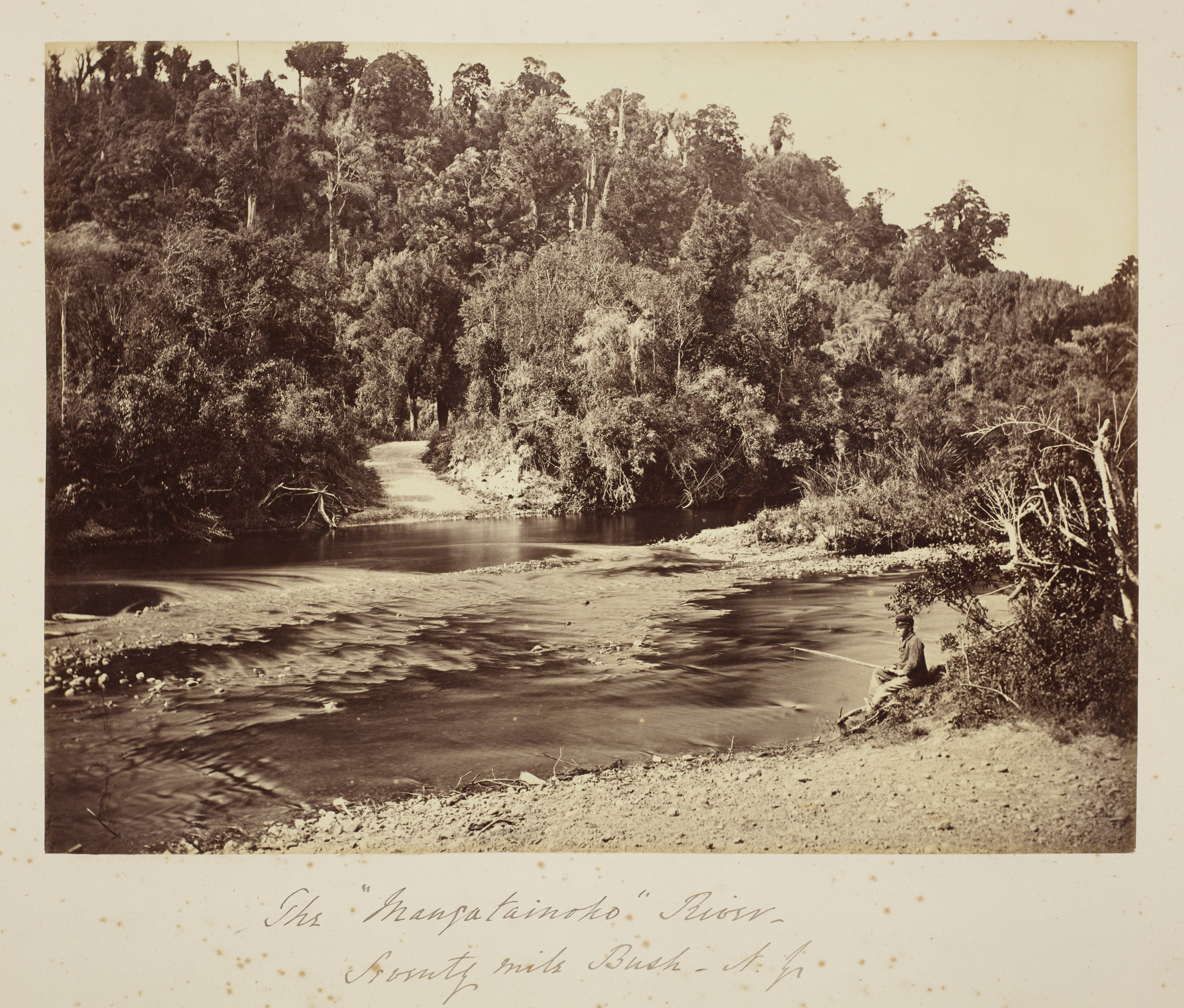
The Mangatainoka River within Seventy Mile Bush

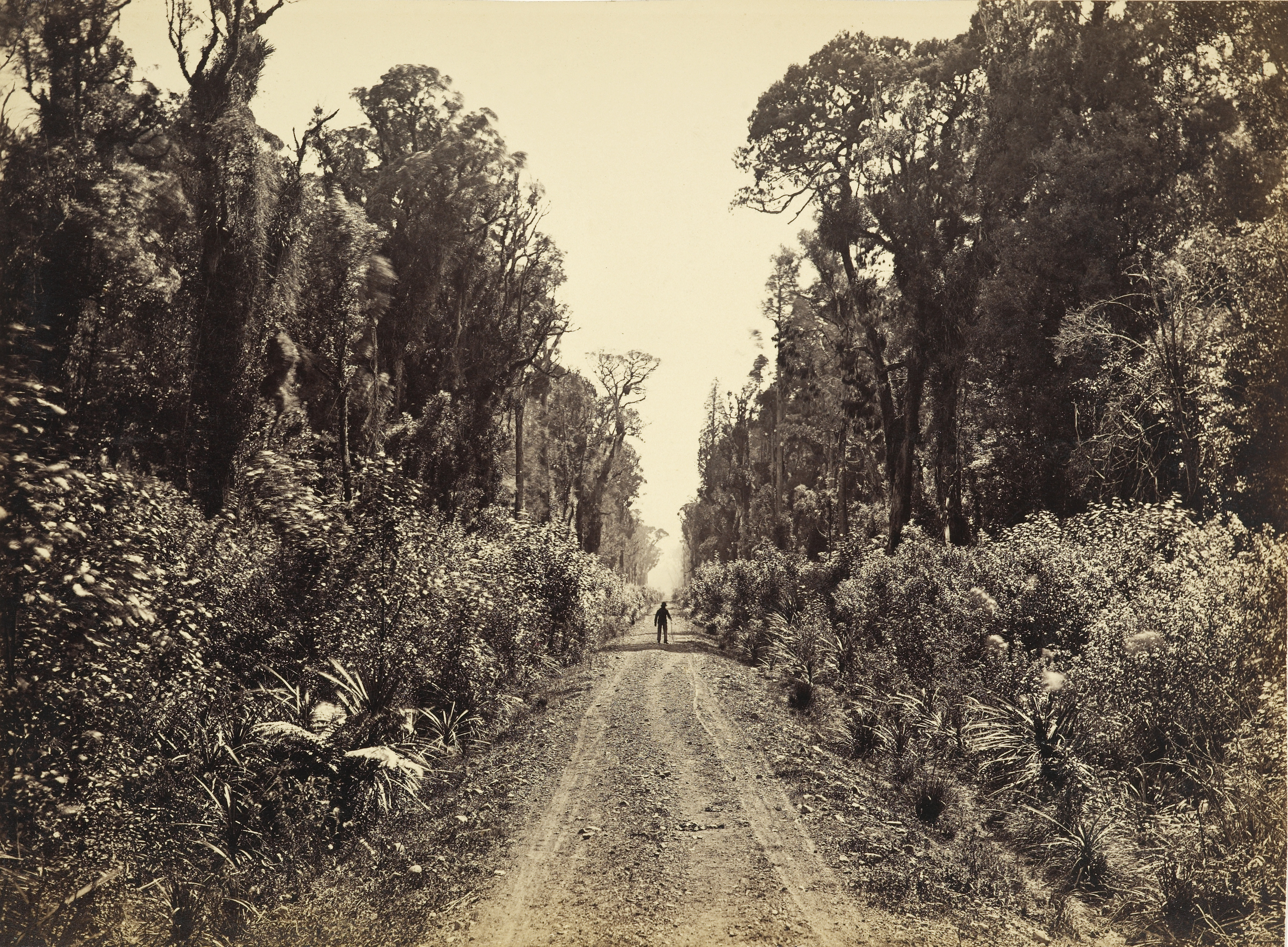
Five Mile Avenue, Forty Mile Bush, Eketāhuna, circa 1875

Forty Mile Bush remnant at Mount Bruce, 2008

The Seventy Mile Bush was a heavily forested area of New Zealand extending from Wairarapa to Central Hawkes Bay and out to that coast. It was cleared and settled by Scandinavians, assisted immigrants in the 1870s. On arrival they walked from the surrounding coastal settlements (Wellington, Foxton and Napier) to cut down the forest and clear the land for farming. The land was not as described to them. Without funds for a return passage they were obliged to remain.

The area encompasses what are now the towns of Norsewood, Dannevirke, Pahiatua and Eketāhuna in the Tararua District and reached right into Hawkes Bay to the outskirts of Takapau and Maraekakaho. Its eastern boundary stretched almost due north–south from just south of Cape Turnagain on the coast to about 40 kilometres due west of Hastings.

The Forty Mile Bush was the southern part of the Seventy Mile Bush. It extended from Kopuaranga near Masterton to Woodville. A remnant was saved in 1888, the Mount Bruce Forest Reserve, now the site of the Pūkaha / Mount Bruce National Wildlife Centre.
