= Wimbledon, New Zealand =

Locality in New Zealand

Wimbledon
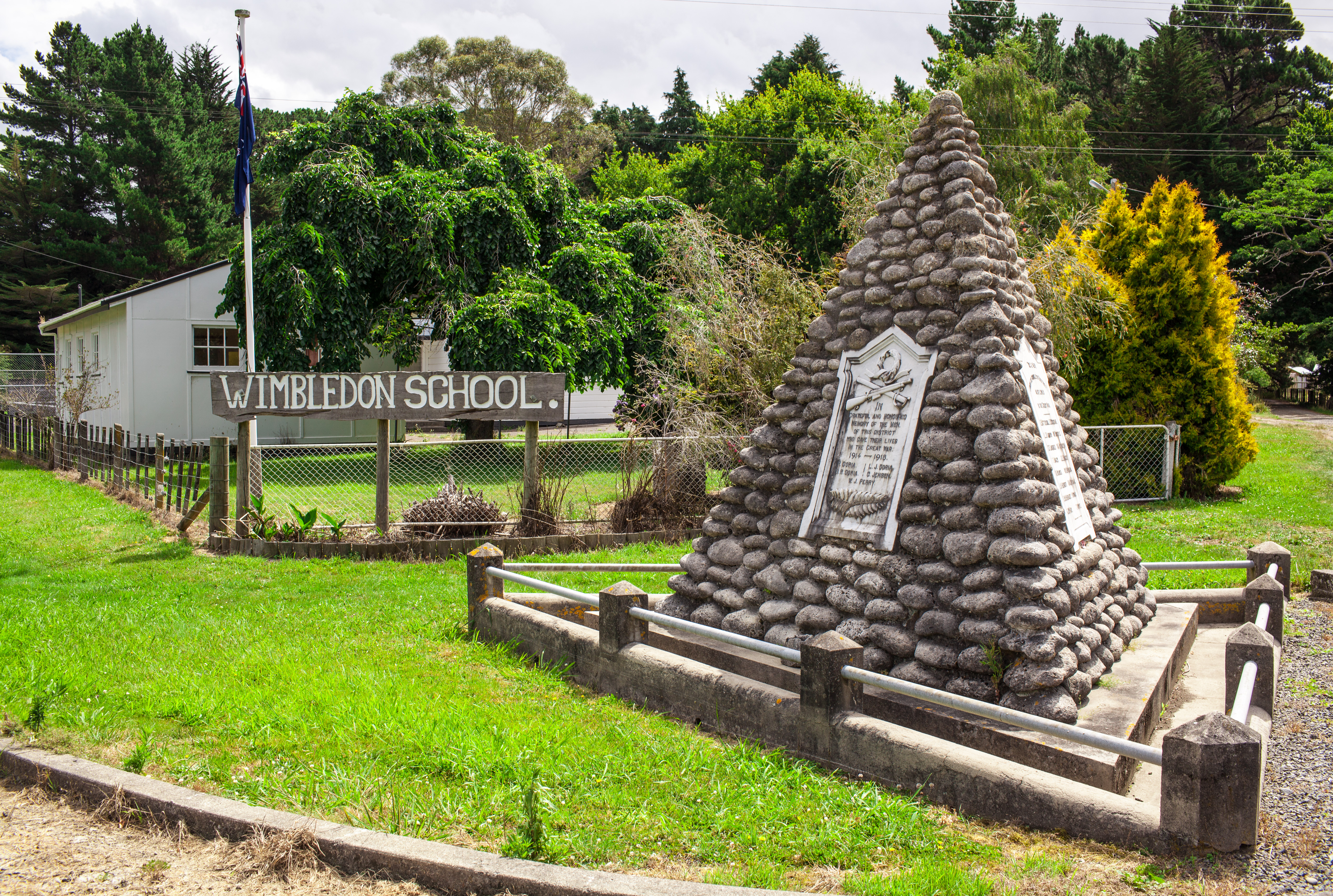
- Wimbledon World War I Memorial and school
- Interactive map of Wimbledon
- Coordinates: 40.441°S 176.507°E
- Country: New Zealand
- Region: Manawatū-Whanganui
- Territorial authority: Tararua District

Wimbledon is a farming locality in the Tararua District, New Zealand. It is located on the former SH 52 between Waipukurau and Masterton. It is 21 kilometres (13 mi) from Weber, 9 kilometres (5.6 mi) from Herbertville on the coast, and 11 kilometres (6.8 mi) inland from Cape Turnagain. The Waikopiro Stream runs into the Wainui River at Wimbledon.

Wimbledon has a war memorial, a few farms and a tavern A heritage listed building built in 1886. The area is well known for sheep farming and for exotic breeds of sheep.

The locality was named after Wimbledon in England during the 1880s after a local resident shot a bullock while standing a considerable distance away. It was considered by onlookers to be a shot worthy of the rifle-shooting championships held in Wimbledon at the time.

== Education ==
Wimbledon School opened in 1892. Herbertville School amalgamated with Wimbledon in 1960. It closed in 1996.
