= Route 52 (New Zealand) =

Road in New Zealand

State Highway 52
- Route of former State Highway 52

Route information
- Maintained by Central Hawke's Bay District Council, Tararua District Council, Masterton District Council

Major junctions
- North end: SH 2 at Waipukurau
- South end: SH 2 at Masterton

Location
- Country: New Zealand
- Primary destinations: Porangahau, Weber, Pongaroa

Highway system
- New Zealand state highways; Motorways and expressways; List
← SH 51	→ SH 53

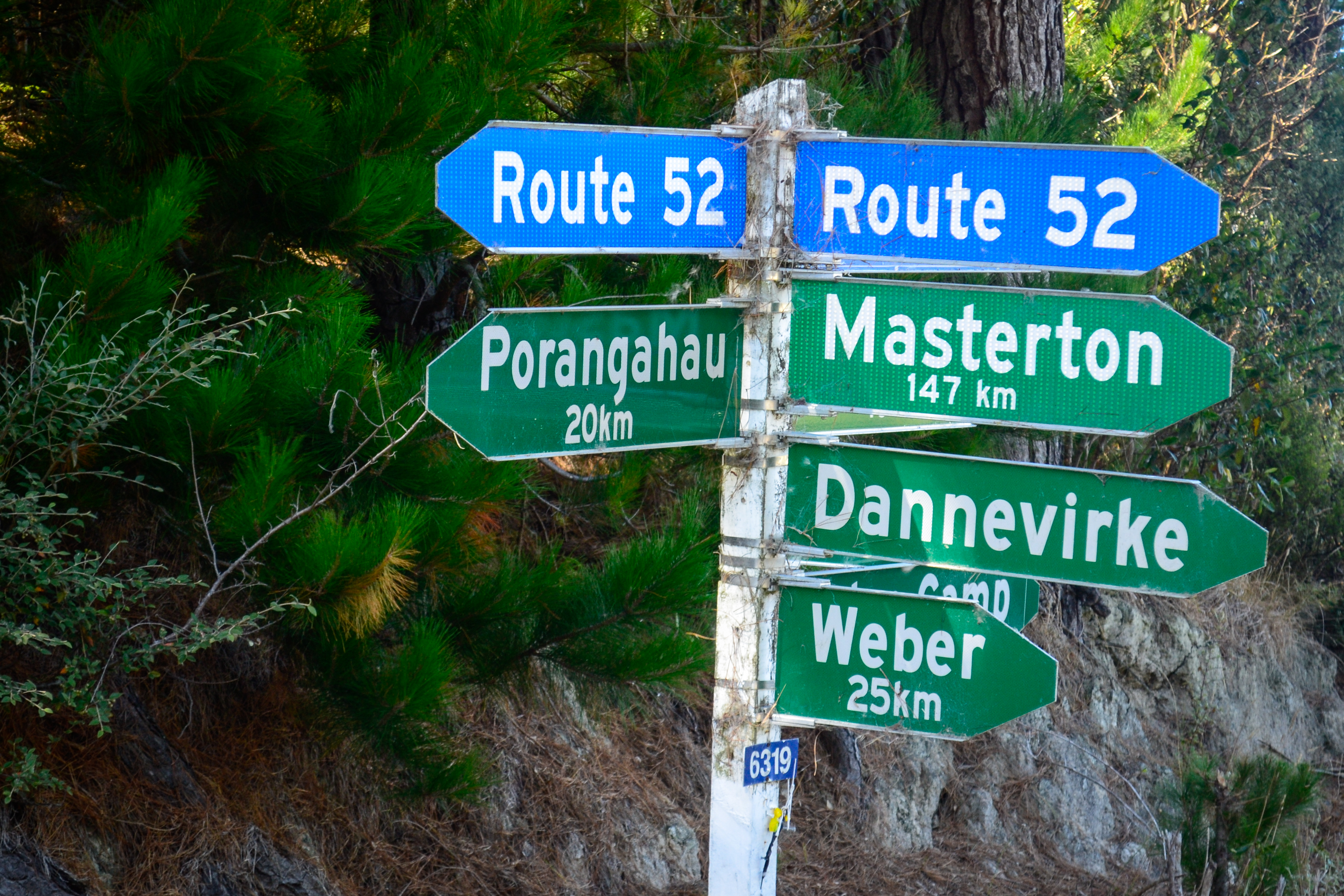

State Highway 52 is a former state highway now reclassified Route 52. It runs from Waipukurau, to Masterton in the Wairarapa through Porangahau on the east coast and the Weber and Pongaroa hill country in the Tararua District on the lower eastern side of the North Island.

== History ==
Route 52 runs south through the Tararua District to the Wairarapa passing through the coastal side of the one-time very dense forest of the Seventy Mile Bush, known at its southern end as the Forty Mile Bush.

Waipukurau to Porangahau

The 26 miles of road was approved by Provincial Council in April 1859 and constructed over the next year but, five years later, passage was still difficult.

Porangahau to Weber

By 1864 a road reached Wainui — renamed Herbertville in 1889 — though bridges still had to be made. A separate Weber Road Board was established in 1890, an offshoot of the Porangahau Road Board.

Weber Pongaroa Alfredton

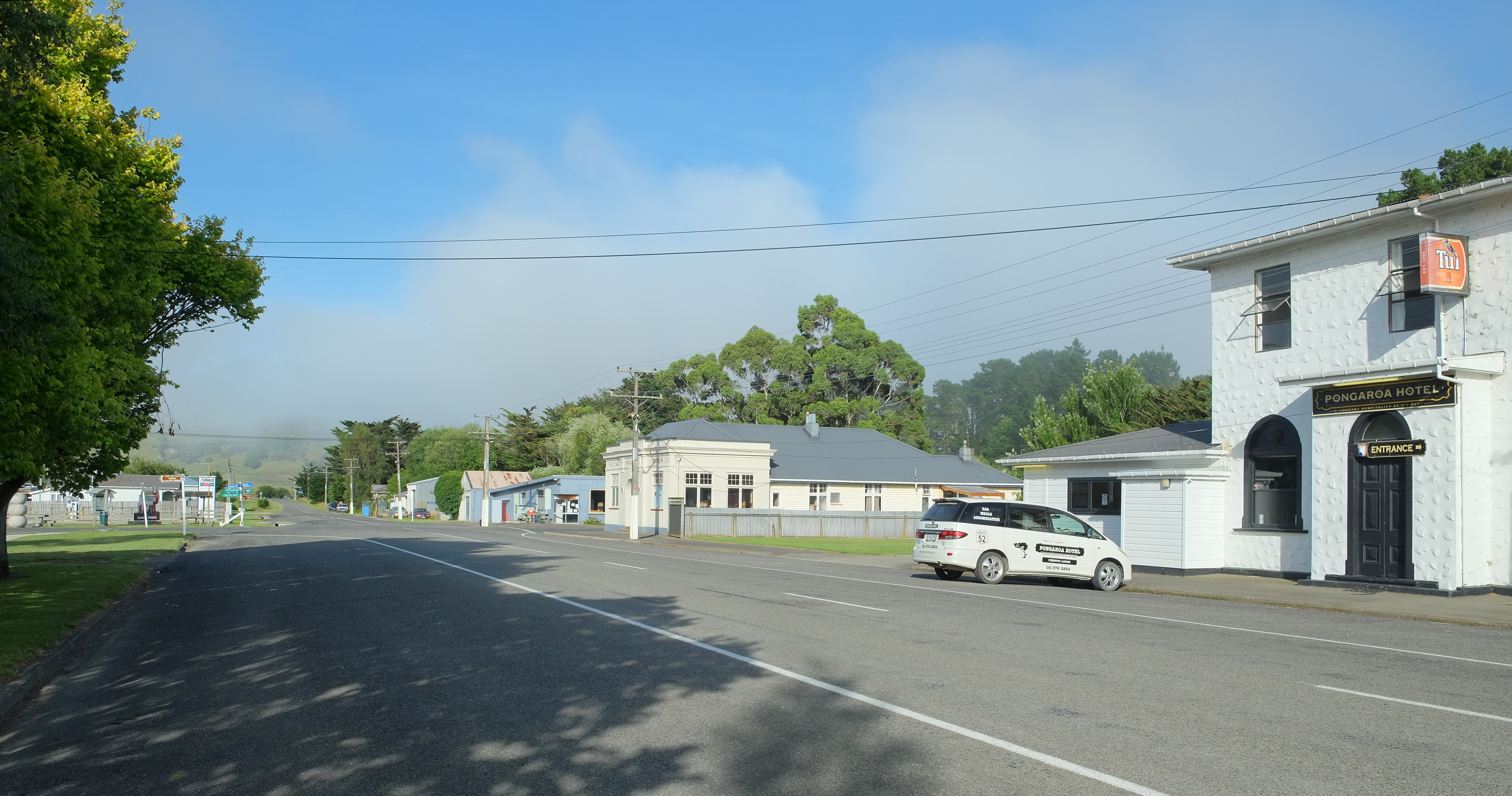
Route 52 through Pongaroa in 2022

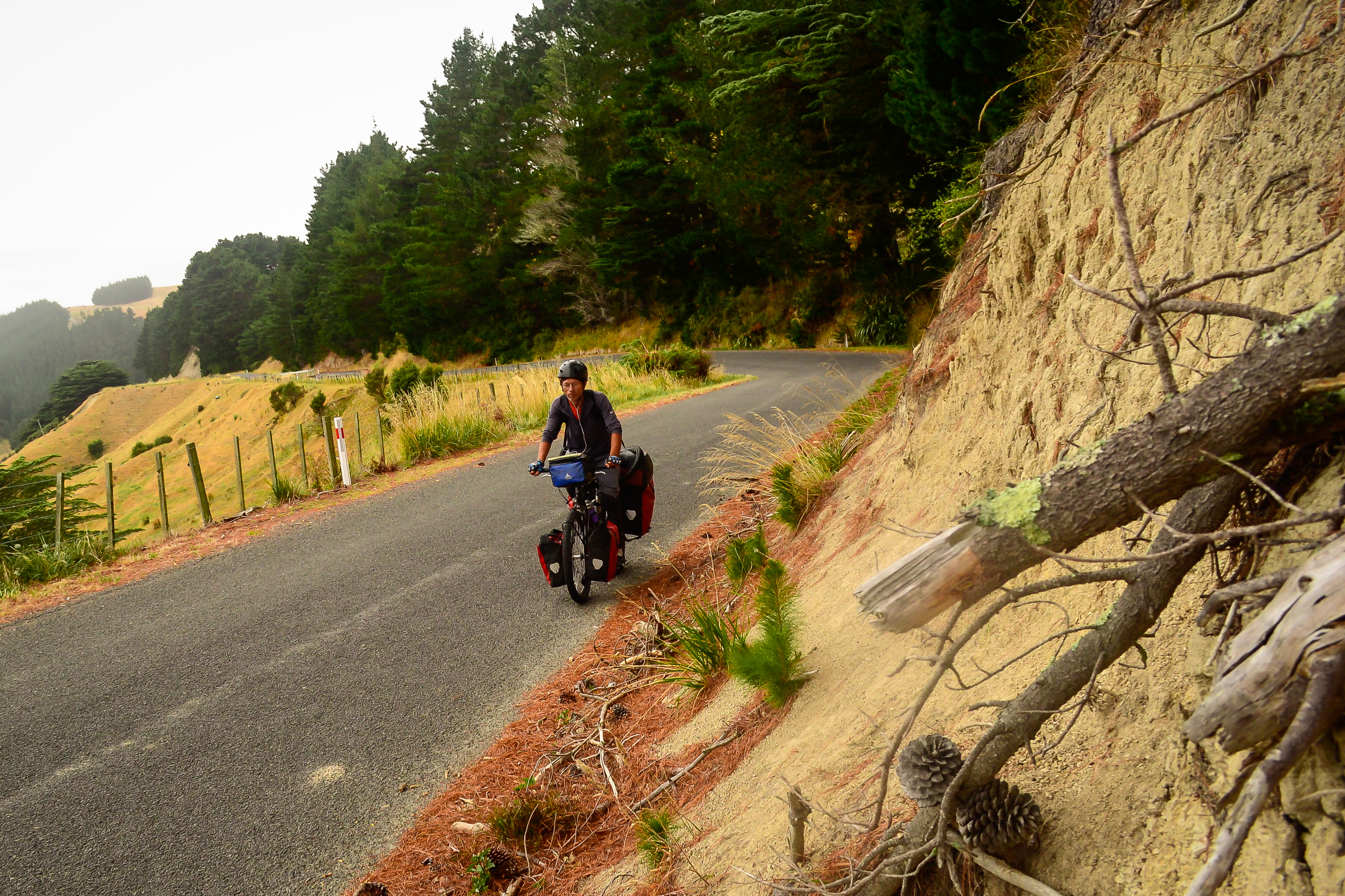

Sections in the settlement of Pongaroa were offered for sale in March 1895. Roadwork ceased for the winter in June 1895 with 2 1/2 miles of road formed. By the end of May the Minister of Lands had ordered signs banning bullocks from working between Falls creek and Pongaroa stream, between 1 June and 1 November. Some account follows of the battle to make this section of the road.

John O'Meara successfully campaigned for the Pahiatua seat in the 1896 general election. Part of his platform was that land should be roaded before new settlers were obliged to live on that land to keep their title. At an election meeting in Woodville he claimed to have never before seen such a place as the road between Pongaroa and Weber. Nineteen (pack)horses had been lost on that road that winter. In January it was announced roadworks at Pongaroa would recommence around the end of the month. Six parties of "co-operative labourers" duly began forming the road between Makuri and Pongaroa before the month was out.

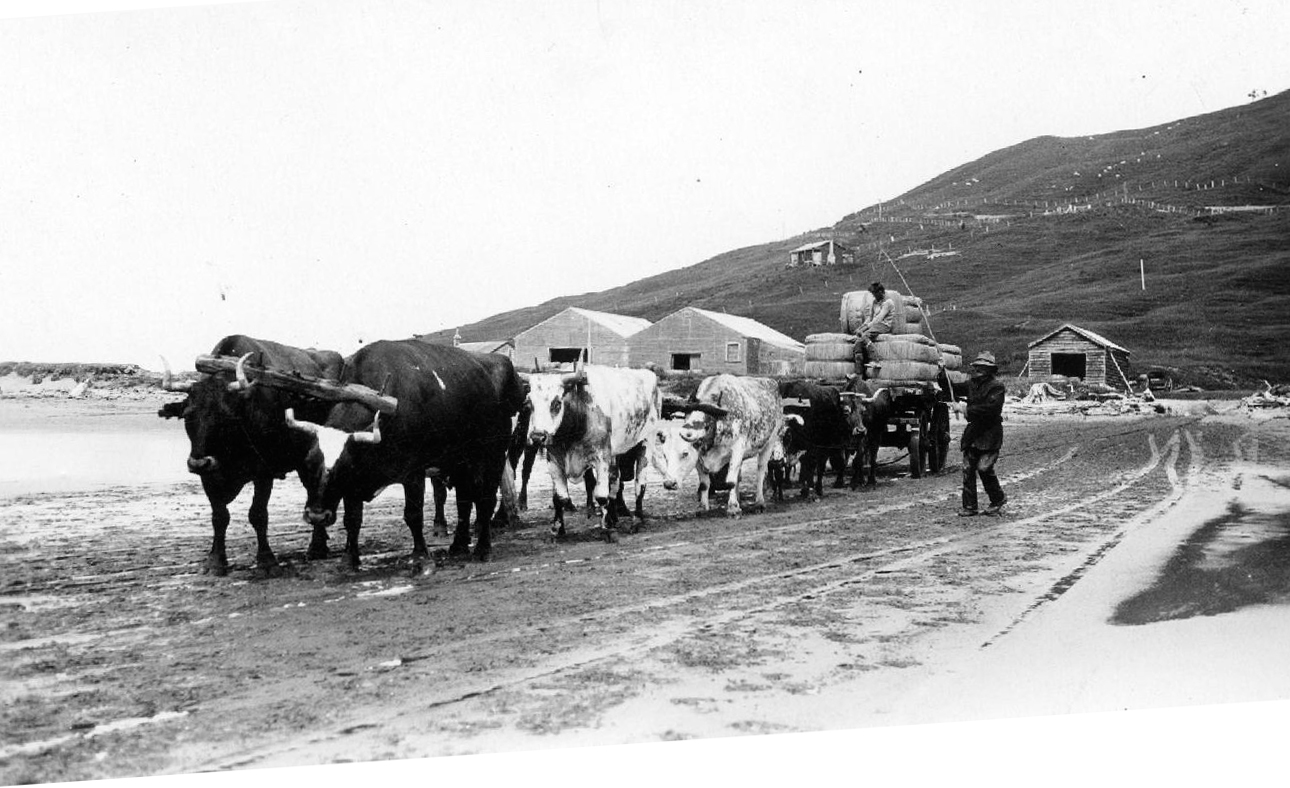
Shipping wool from Ākitio beach. The bullock team will take the dray into water deep enough for the wool to be loaded onto a boat then rowed to the steamer

In June the Ashburton Guardian said the road to Pongoroa is so bad it takes fourteen bullocks to haul just two tons to the township. While passable by a light vehicle in summer in winter or after heavy rain the banks slipped and the road had to be made over and over again. The same geological structure brought complaints from settlers that the ground did not drain properly and counter to its appearance had low fertility.

By 1903 the roading position had improved to the point where the major concern was what proportions of the cost should be borne by central government and the Road Board's ratepayers.

Alfredton in the Moroa to Masterton

A route was surveyed by the Provincial Engineer in 1866. There was pressure from ratepayers to limit new roads to those leading to the coast (Castlepoint) on the grounds that sea transport was more economical and roads were used once-weekly by coach services considered "the luxury of wealthy squatters". However, by May 1885 a local newspaper was able to report the completion of the 80 foot span of the bridge over the Ihuraua river and described the new bridge as the key to the Alfredton and Tiraumea districts.

=== Downgrade ===
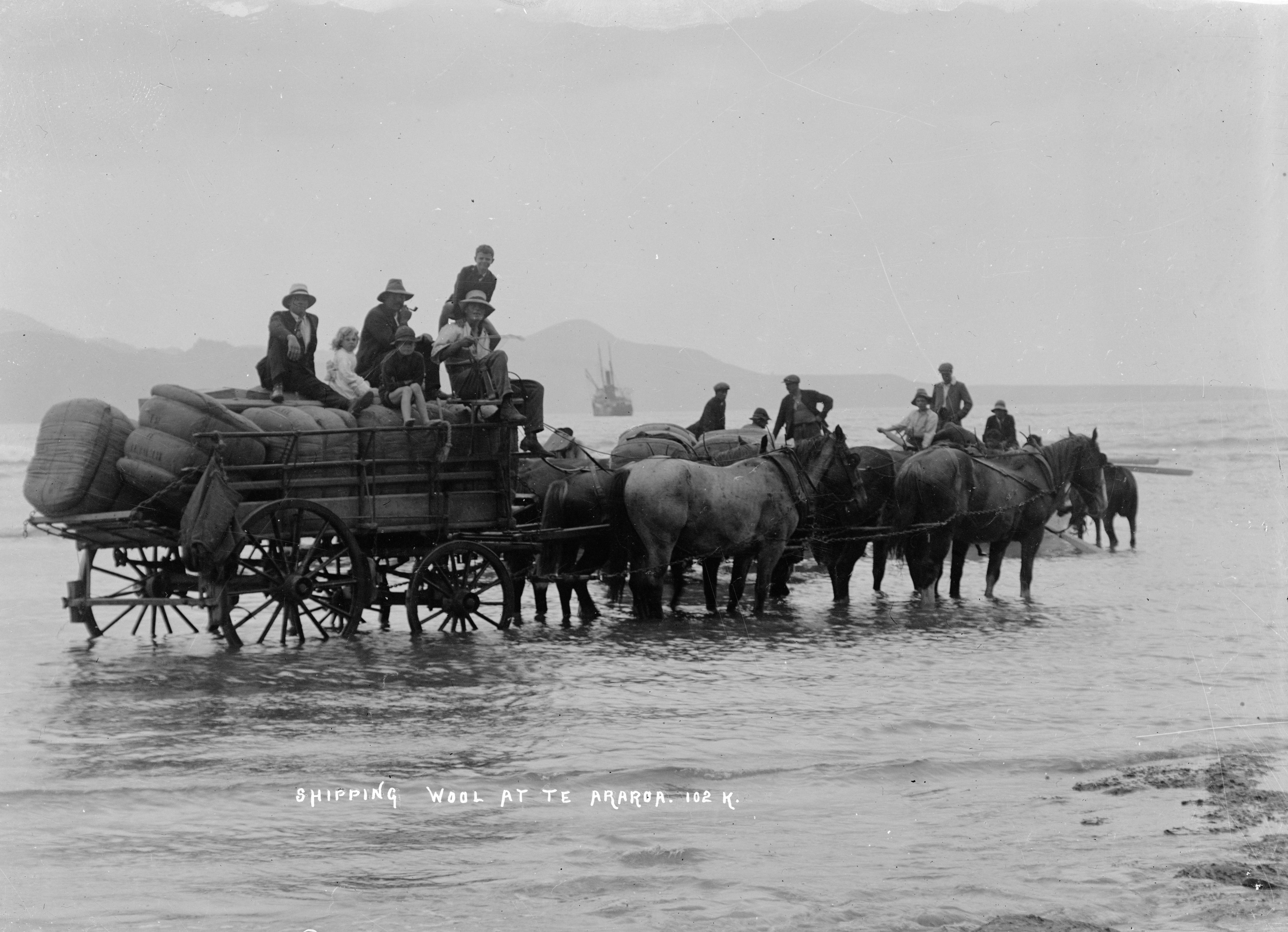
Shipping wool from the East Coast near East Cape, the steamer waits, the shallow draft boat in a flooded creek is almost hidden by the horses on the creek's bank

Route 52, upgraded to a State Highway about 1960, lost its state highway status because usage did not grow but fell away as prosperity deserted New Zealand's farming industry. Farmers shed staff and cut back development. Farming districts became depopulated and the intervening settlements failed to grow. Nevertheless, Route 52 remains the only road access to large areas of highly productive hill country farmland.

Once serviced by coastal steamers remote areas like Ākitio and Herbertville are accessed through Route 52's links to SH 2.

Because of its scenic qualities it is now a cycle touring route and noted by some as one of the must drive roads in New Zealand. The road is relatively narrow and winds through steep hill country. Wandering livestock and stock trucks are hazards.

== Route ==
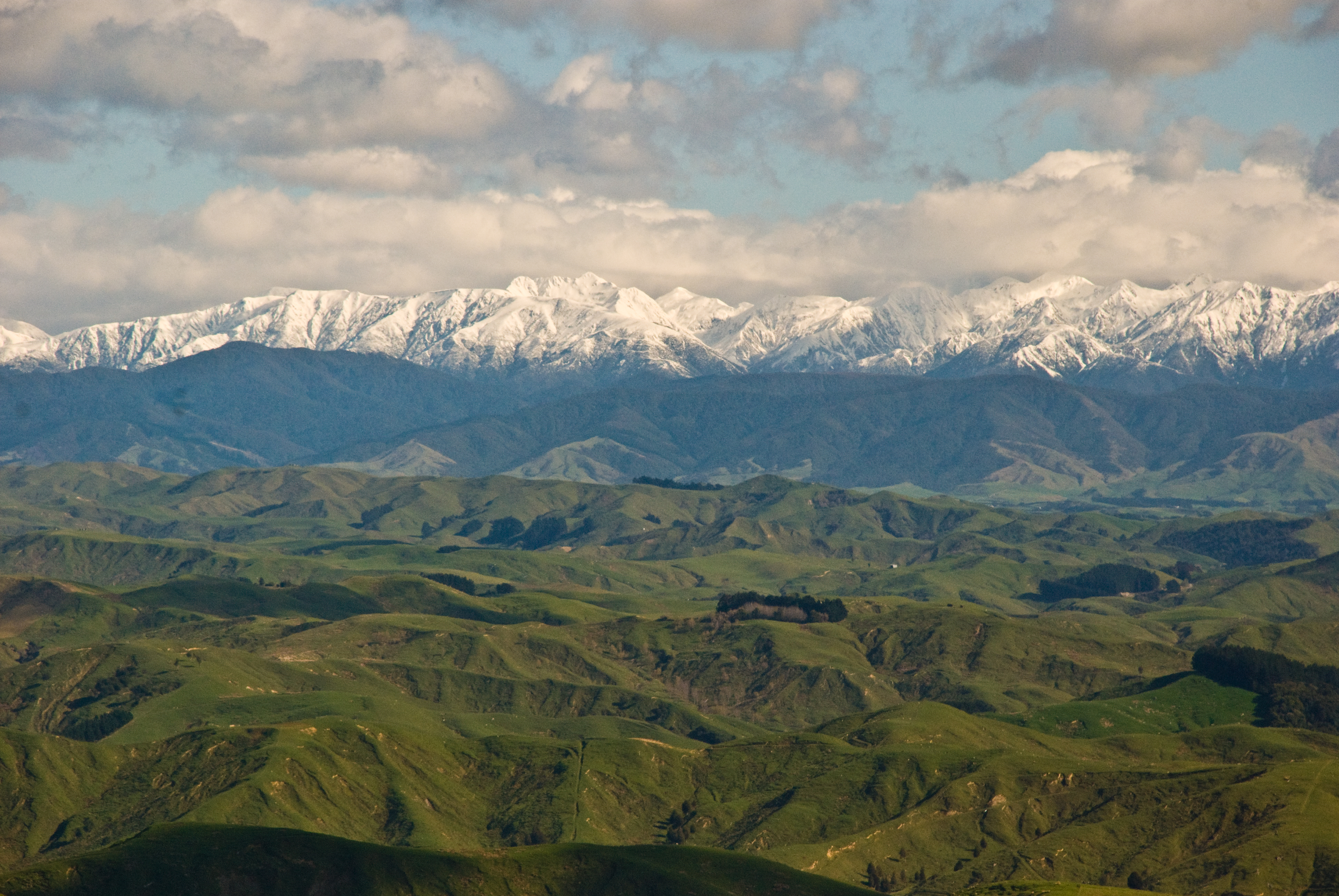
Hill country farmland near Tiraumea, Tararua mountain range backdrop

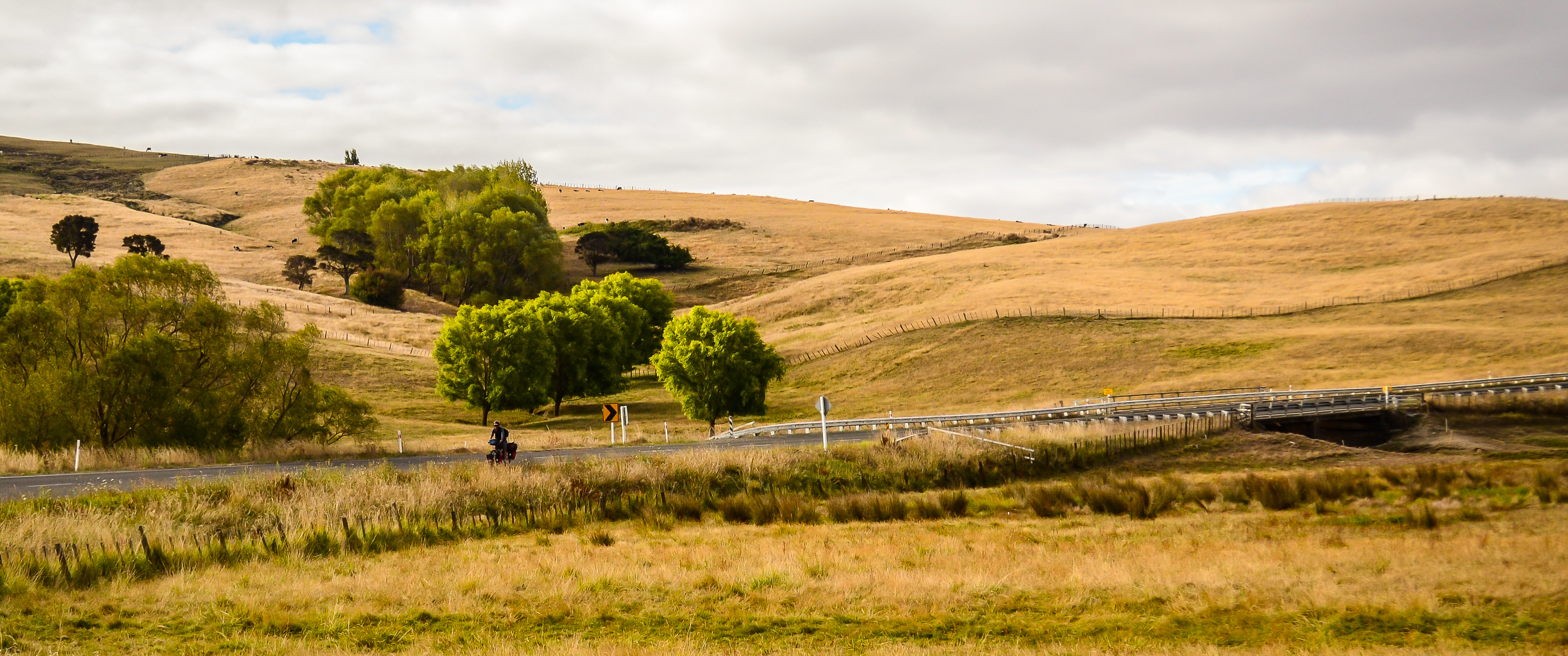
Southern Hawke's Bay

Route 52 leaves Waipukurau at its intersection with SH 2. From there it passes through numerous small farm settlements. Heading south-east the highway goes to the coastline at Porangahau through Wanstead and Wallingford where it turns back inland in a SSW direction. From there it passes through Weber, Waione, Pongaroa, and Tiraumea before heading west to Alfredton. From Alfredton it heads in more southerly direction to Ihuraua along Whangaehu Valley Road to Lansdowne, Masterton.

== Taumata ==
A few kilometres south of Porangahau Route 52 passes a hill with one of the world's longest place names, Taumatawhakatangihangakoauauotamateapokaiwhenuakitanatahu. A Māori word meaning "The place where Tamatea, the man with the big knees, who slid, climbed and swallowed mountains, known as 'landeater', played his flute to his loved one".

== See also ==
- List of New Zealand state highways
