= Wainui River (Manawatū-Whanganui) =

River in the Manawatū-Whanganui Region, New Zealand

- Route of the Wainui River
- Mouth of the Wainui River Wainui River (Manawatū-Whanganui) (North Island)
- Etymology: Māori meaning "large waters"
- Native name: Tautāne (Māori)

Location
- Country: New Zealand
- Island: North Island
- Region: Manawatū-Whanganui
- District: Tararua

Physical characteristics
- Source: Mount McCartie
  - coordinates: 40.429°S 176.421°E
- Mouth: Pacific Ocean
  - location: Herbertville
  - coordinates: 40°29′46″S 176°33′36″E
  - elevation: Sea level
- Length: 28 km (17 mi)

Basin features
- Progression: Wainui River → Pacific Ocean
- Cities: Wimbledon, Herbertville
- Tributaries
  - left: Wimbledon Stream, Waikopiro Stream, Mangaohau Stream, Tapui Stream
  - right: Mangaone Stream
- Bridges: Sergeants Culvert, Morgans Est Bridge, Morgans No. 2 Bridge, Hales Bridge, Cochranes Bridge, Gollans Bridge, Wimbledon Bridge, Bridge near 170 Herbertville Road, Woodbank Bridge (Herbertville Road), Wainui River Bridge

The Wainui River is a river of the Tararua District in the Manawatū-Whanganui Region of New Zealand's North Island. It rises on Mt McCartie and flows approximately 28 km (17 mi) southeast through isolated hill country to reach the Pacific coast at Herbertville, five kilometres west of Cape Turnagain. The name Wainui means large waters. It is derived from the Māori words wai meaning water and nui meaning large.

== Tributaries ==
The Wainui River has a number of small tributary streams. Tributaries include (west to east): Angora Stream, Wimbledon Stream, Waikopiro Stream, Mangaone Stream, Mangaohau Stream, Tapui Stream, and Wairauka Stream.

== See also ==
- List of rivers of New Zealand
