= Ākitio River =

River in New Zealand

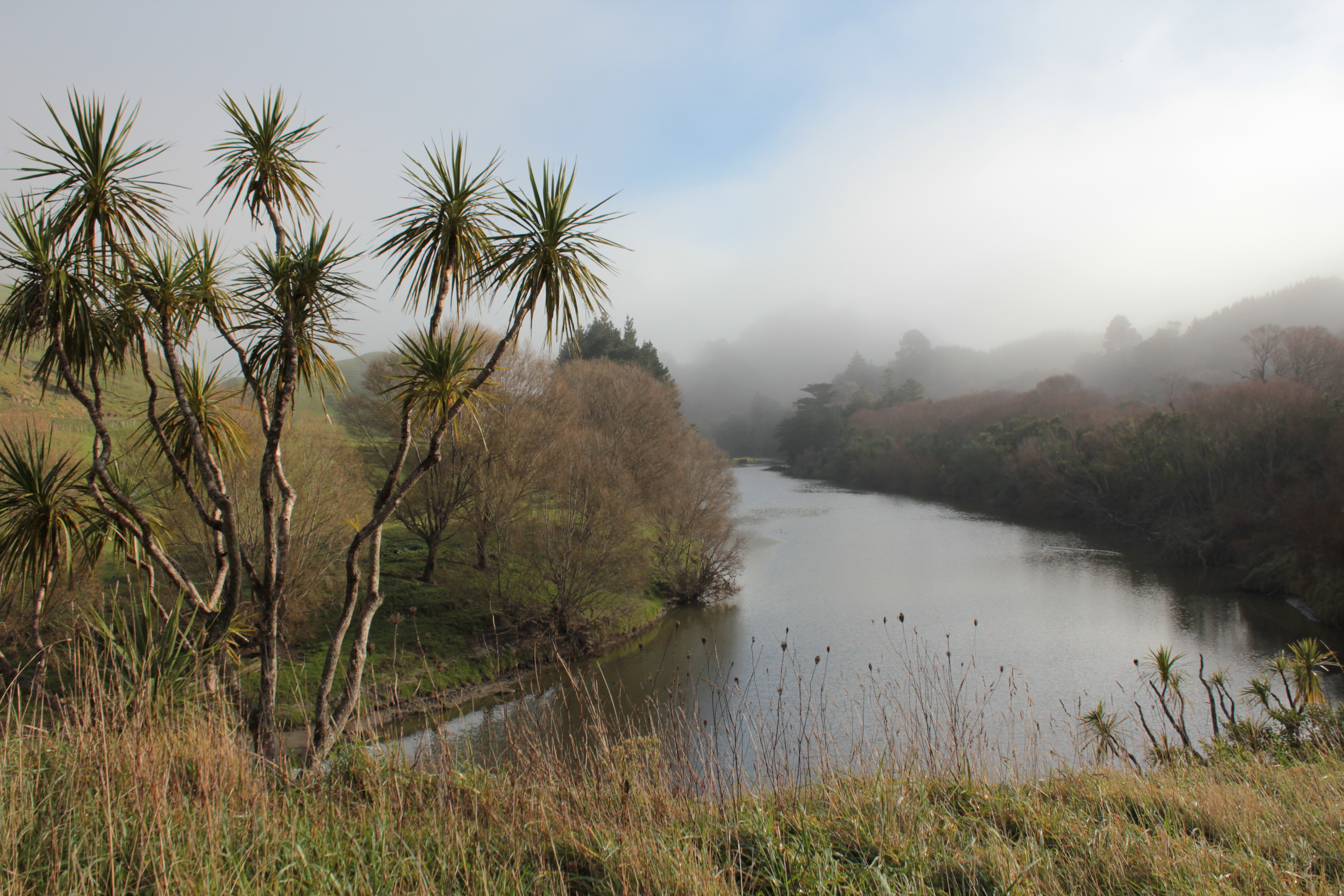
- The Ākitio River upstream from Ākitio
- Route of the Ākitio River
- Mouth of the Ākitio River Ākitio River (North Island)
- Native name: Ākitio (Māori)

Location
- Country: New Zealand
- Island: North Island
- Region: Manawatū-Whanganui
- District: Tararua

Physical characteristics
- Source: 2 km (1.2 mi) east of Te Awaputahi
  - coordinates: 40.39°S 176.422°E
  - elevation: 330 m (1,080 ft)
- Mouth: Pacific Ocean
  - location: Ākitio
  - coordinates: 40°36′09″S 176°25′15″E
  - elevation: Sea level
- Length: 79 km (49 mi)

Basin features
- Progression: Ākitio River → Pacific Ocean
- Cities: Weber, Ākitio
- Tributaries
  - left: Ossa Stream, Tahuokaretu Stream, Rakaupuhipuhi Stream, Mangaone Stream, Mangahewa Stream, Wakawaihine Stream, Middle Creek
  - right: Riddley Stream, Red River, Mangapuku Stream, Waipatiki Stream, Table Stream, Waihi Stream, Makukupara Stream, Waihoro Stream, Mangahuia Stream
- Bridges: Akitio River Bridge (Route 52), River Road Bridge, Coast Road Bridge

The Ākitio River is in the North Island of New Zealand. It flows generally southeast for 35 kilometres (22 mi), entering the Pacific Ocean at Ākitio to the south of Cape Turnagain on the east coast.

In July 2020, the name of the river was officially gazetted as Ākitio River by the New Zealand Geographic Board.

Cyclone Gabrielle caused the mouth of the river to move.

== Gallery ==
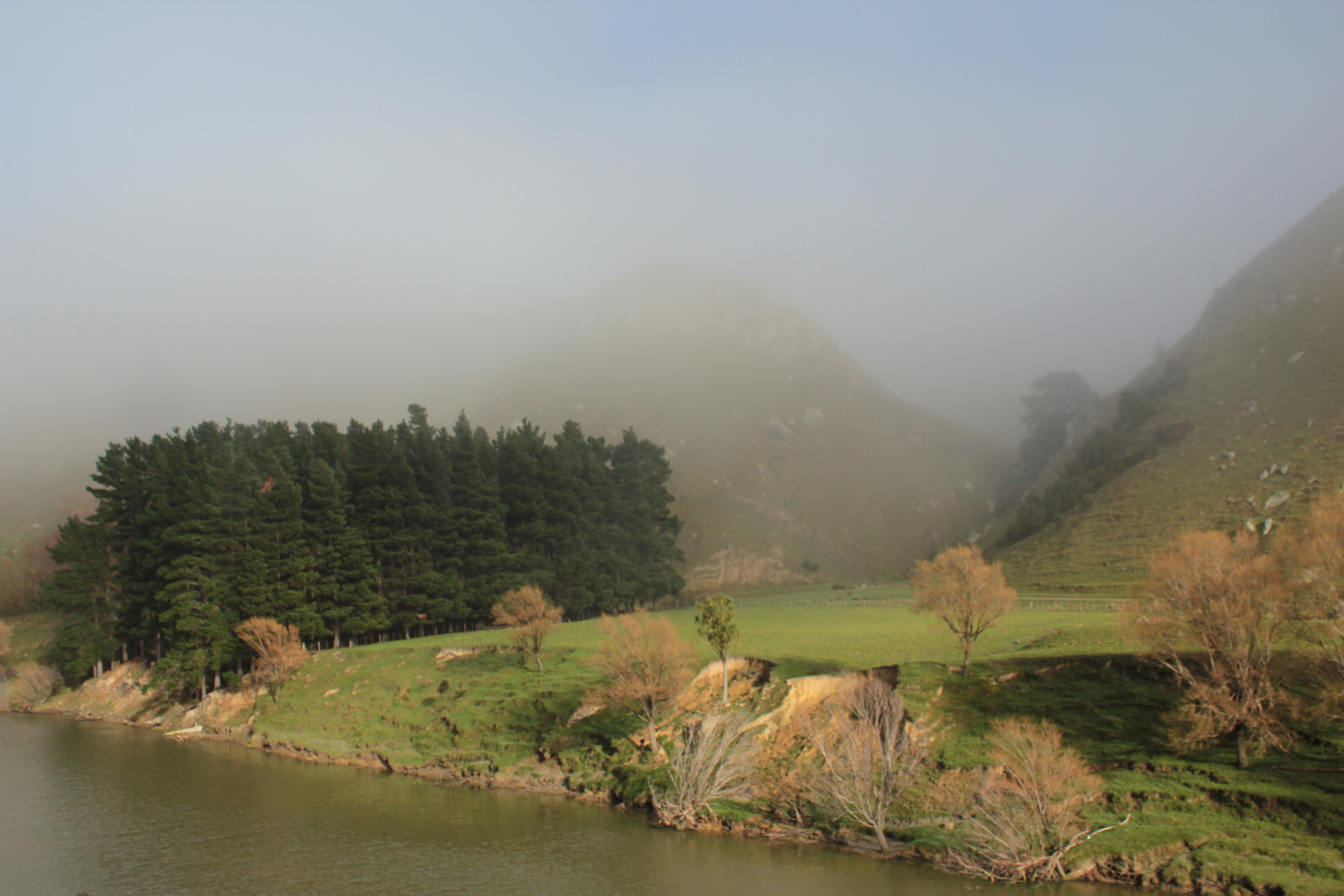

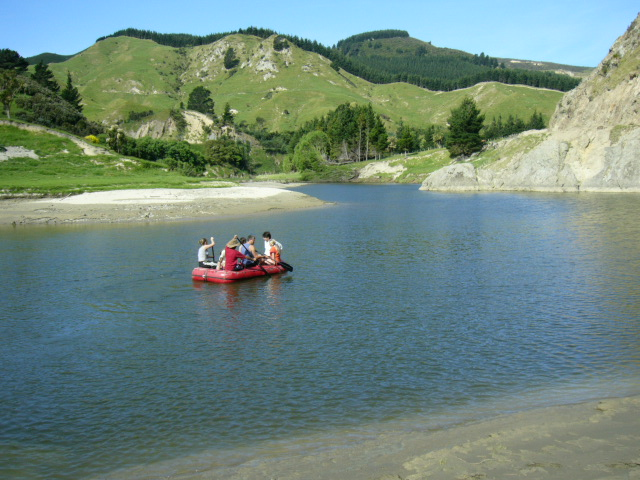

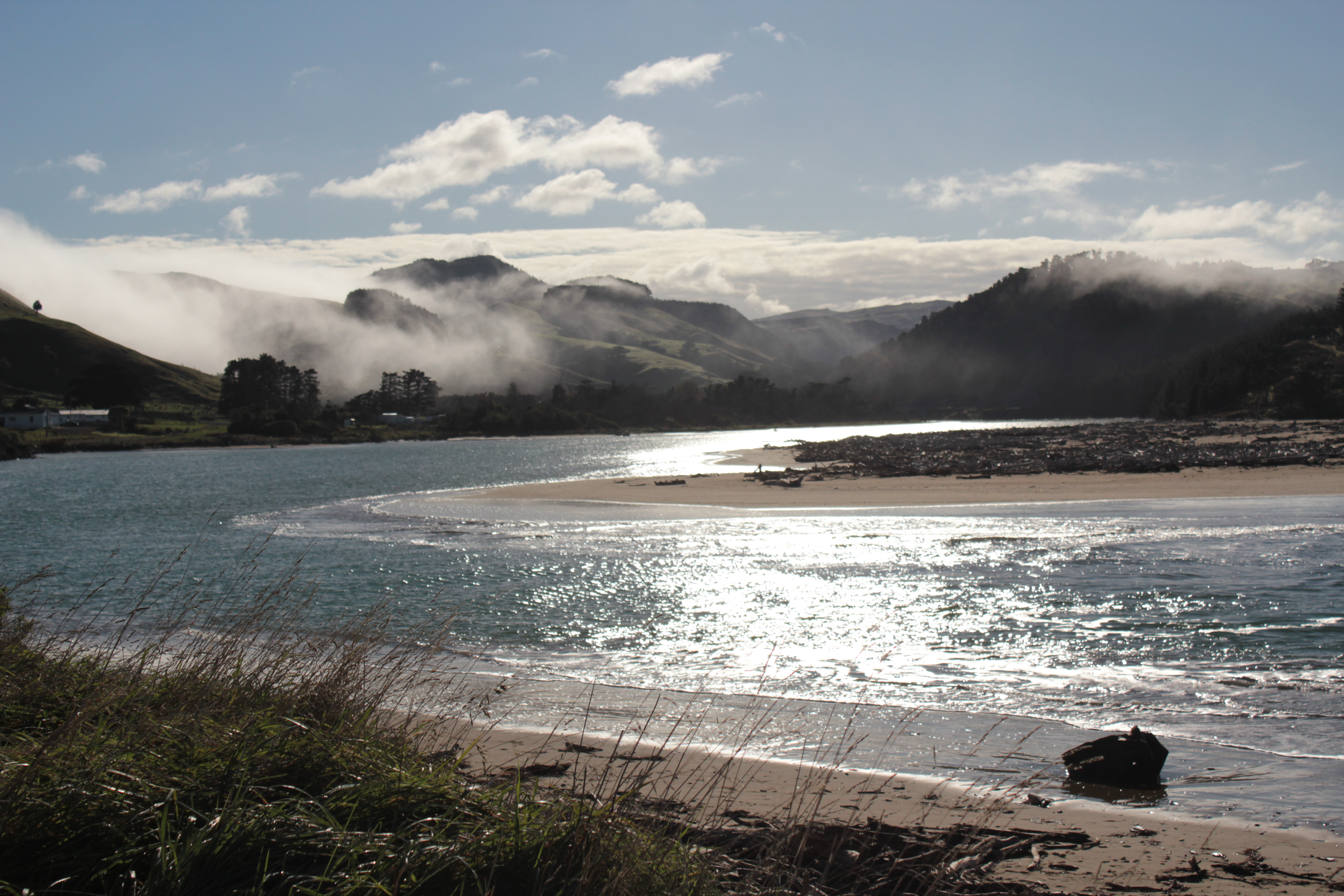
