= Red River (New Zealand) =

River in the Manawatū-Whanganui Region, New Zealand

- Route of the Red River
- Mouth of the Red River Red River (New Zealand) (North Island)

Location
- Country: New Zealand
- Island: North Island
- Region: Manawatū-Whanganui
- District: Tararua

Physical characteristics
- Source: Te Uri
  - coordinates: 40.312°S 176.378°E
  - elevation: 500 m (1,600 ft)
- Mouth: Ākitio River
  - coordinates: 40°22′12″S 176°20′38″E
  - elevation: 150 m (490 ft)
- Length: 12 km (7.5 mi)

Basin features
- Progression: Red River → Ākitio River → Pacific Ocean
- Tributaries
  - left: Birch Stream

The Red River is a minor river in the North Island of New Zealand. It feeds into the Ākitio River in the Manawatū-Whanganui region.

== See also ==
- List of rivers of New Zealand
