= Ākitio =

- Locality
- Location within North Island
- Coordinates: 40°36′S 176°25′E
- Country: New Zealand
- Region: Manawatū-Whanganui
- District: Tararua District
- Elevation: 8 m (26 ft)

Population (2023 census)
  - Total: 66
- Time zone: UTC+12 (NZST)
  - Summer (DST): UTC+13 (NZDT)

Ākitio is a coastal community in the Tararua District of the lower east coast of the North Island of New Zealand. The Ākitio River runs for approximately 35 kilometres in a southeast by northwest direction, leading to the town of Weber, on Route 52, formerly State Highway 52.

Ākitio locality covers 188.37 km^{2} (72.73 sq mi) and had a population of 66 in the 2023 New Zealand census.

== History ==
Akitio County, established in 1911, was formerly governed from Pongaroa, located approximately 30 miles (48 km) from Ākitio beach, and the homesteads of Akitio, Marainanga, and Monaroa Stations.

The area originally (and as recently as 1908) was dominated by two estates, the Marainanga Estate, and the Akitio Estate; of 38,000 acres (150 km^{2}), and 50,000 acres (200 km^{2}) each respectively. The region has been partitioned and sub-divided during the past 100 years to consist of many single family sized blocks; from approximately 600 acres (2.4 km^{2}), up to what remains of the original 'Akitio' Estate Station, which remains the largest at approximately 9,000 acres (36 km^{2}) today.

In July 2020, the name of the locality was officially gazetted as Ākitio by the New Zealand Geographic Board.

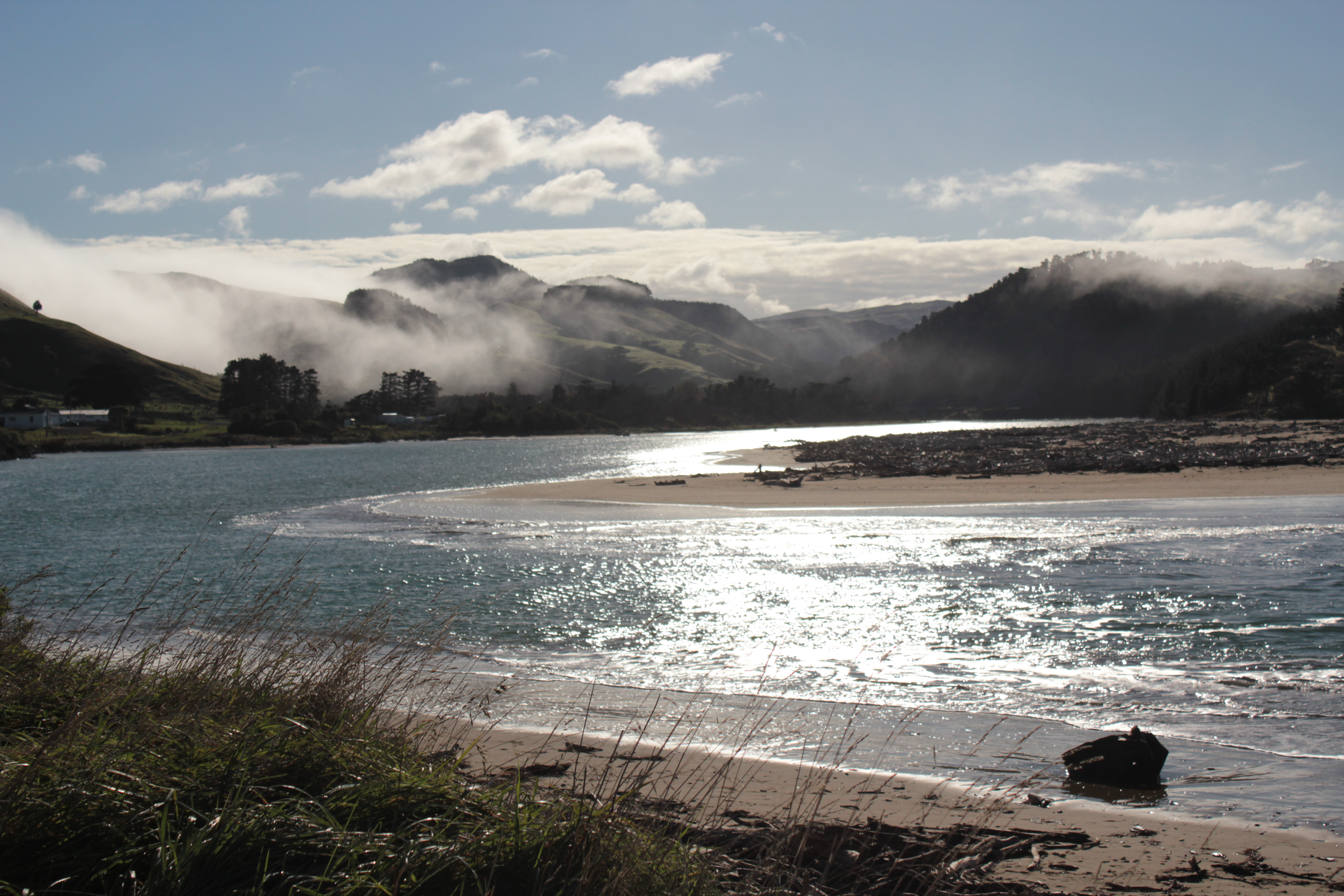
Morning mist at the river mouth

== Infrastructure and communication ==
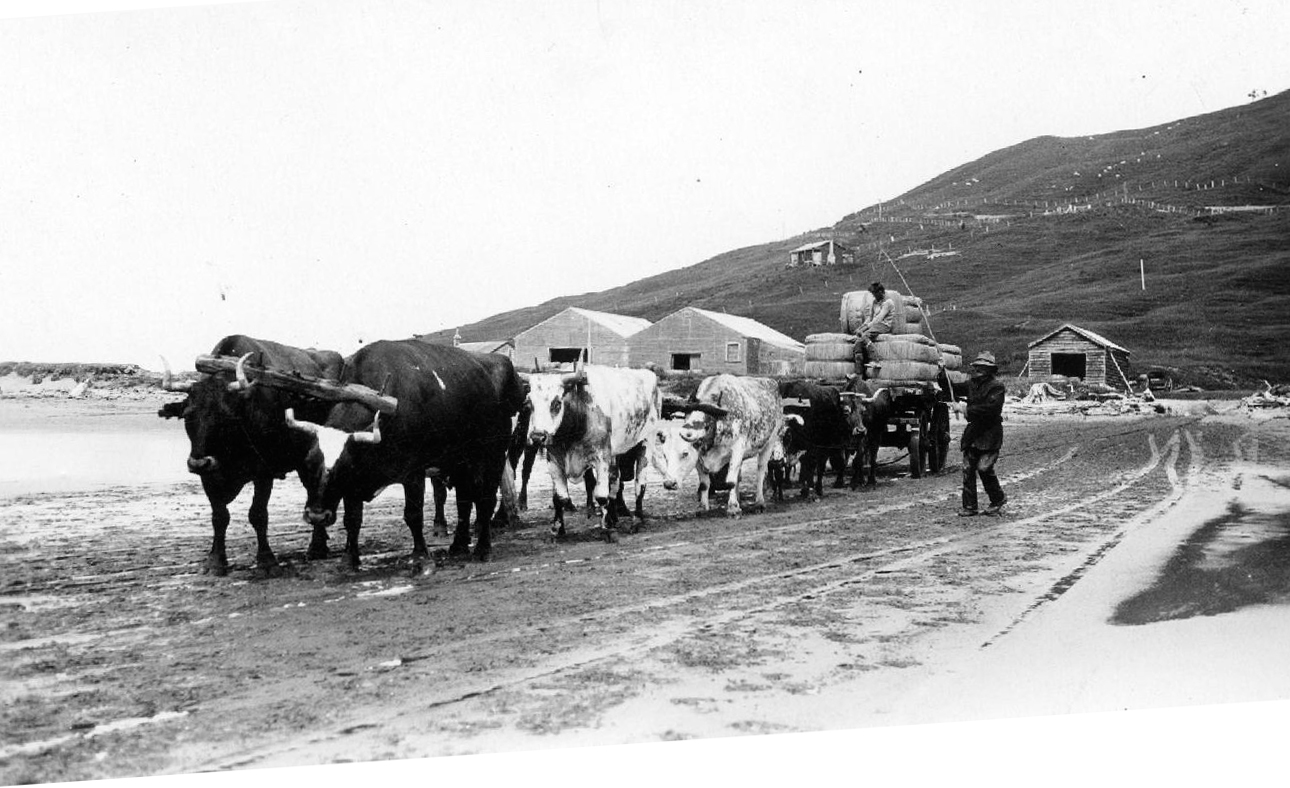
Shipping wool at Ākitio

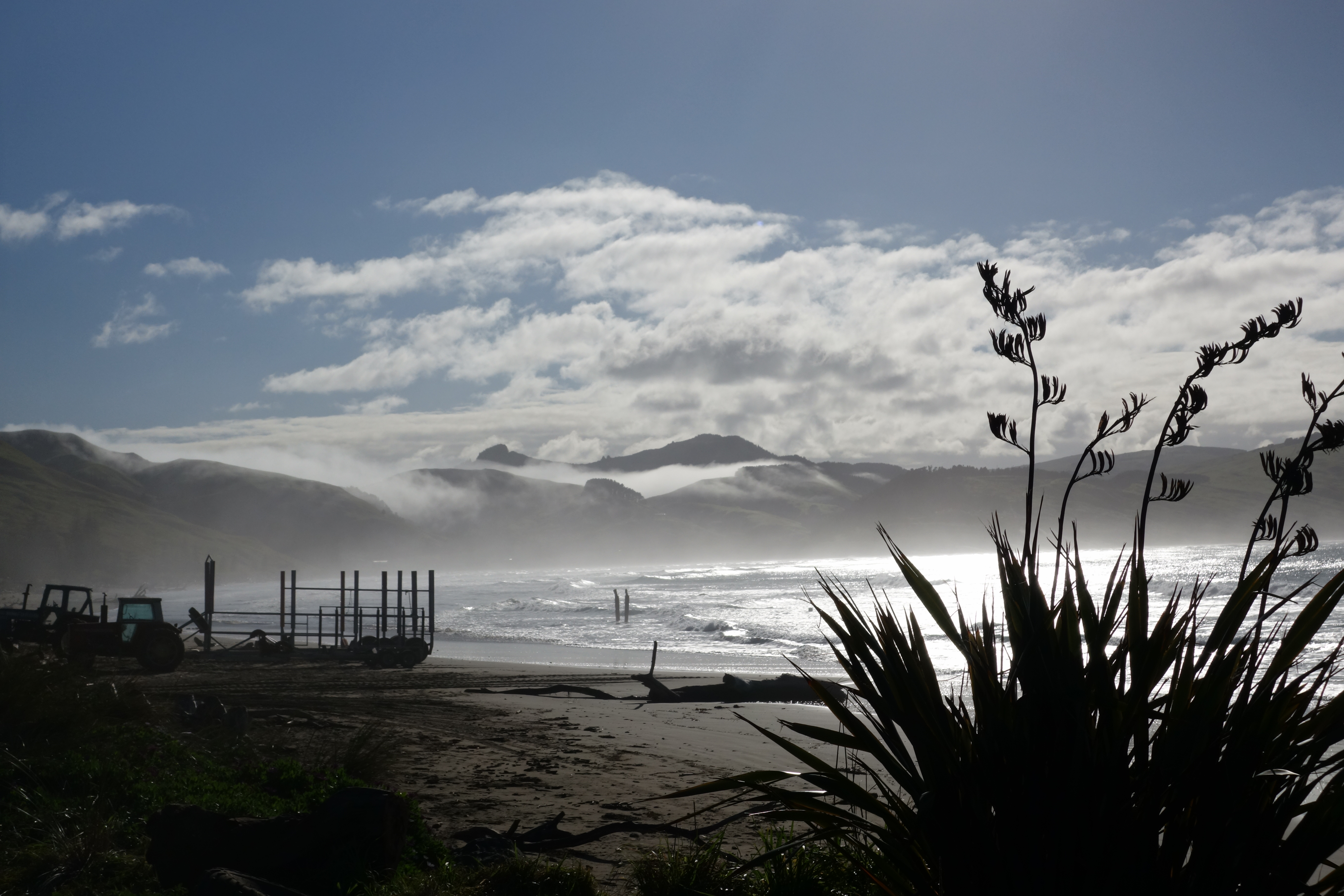
Ākitio beach and some remaining piles

At its peak, shipping would call once a week to the mouth of the Ākitio River, which, before the region's conversion to farmland (and subsequent erosion), could provide safe anchorage in storms due to the tidal ebb and flow reaching 10 km inland, constantly flushing debris and minimal sediment from the river. Today, the river-mouth can nearly be passed on foot at low slack-water, approximately in front of the old harbour master/postmaster's cottage site; and the estuary flanking the three historic homesteads is now characterised by mud-flats at low tide.

Akitio Point, approximately 1.5 km south of the river mouth, offers local fishermen a protective reef, where paua, crayfish and many types of game fish are easily caught. The Annual Fish Akitio competition draws amateur and professional fisherman from all over the region.

'The Point' was historically home to three historic landing sheds, which held the thousands of bales of wool produced annually by the local sheep stations, and also served to receive fencing wire and other manufactured goods from the passing shipping.

A jetty, the remains of which characterise the low tide landscape, would run out into the surf to lighters that would ferry passengers and valuable cargo to and from the freighters. Wool was loaded onto lighters by bullock train. Several ships have been lost in the Akitio bay, including the Peladies (1,020 tonne) in 1899, parts of which can still be found at low tide or scattered around local historic landmarks. The beach remains a popular attraction for surfers and fishermen alike.

Public (or party line) telephone connections were available at the main homesteads until as late as 1988/89, however private telephone wires between the riverside homesteads and the back block station quarters had been installed for over a century.

Riparian remnants of the old saw mills and the various hydro infrastructure survive to this day.

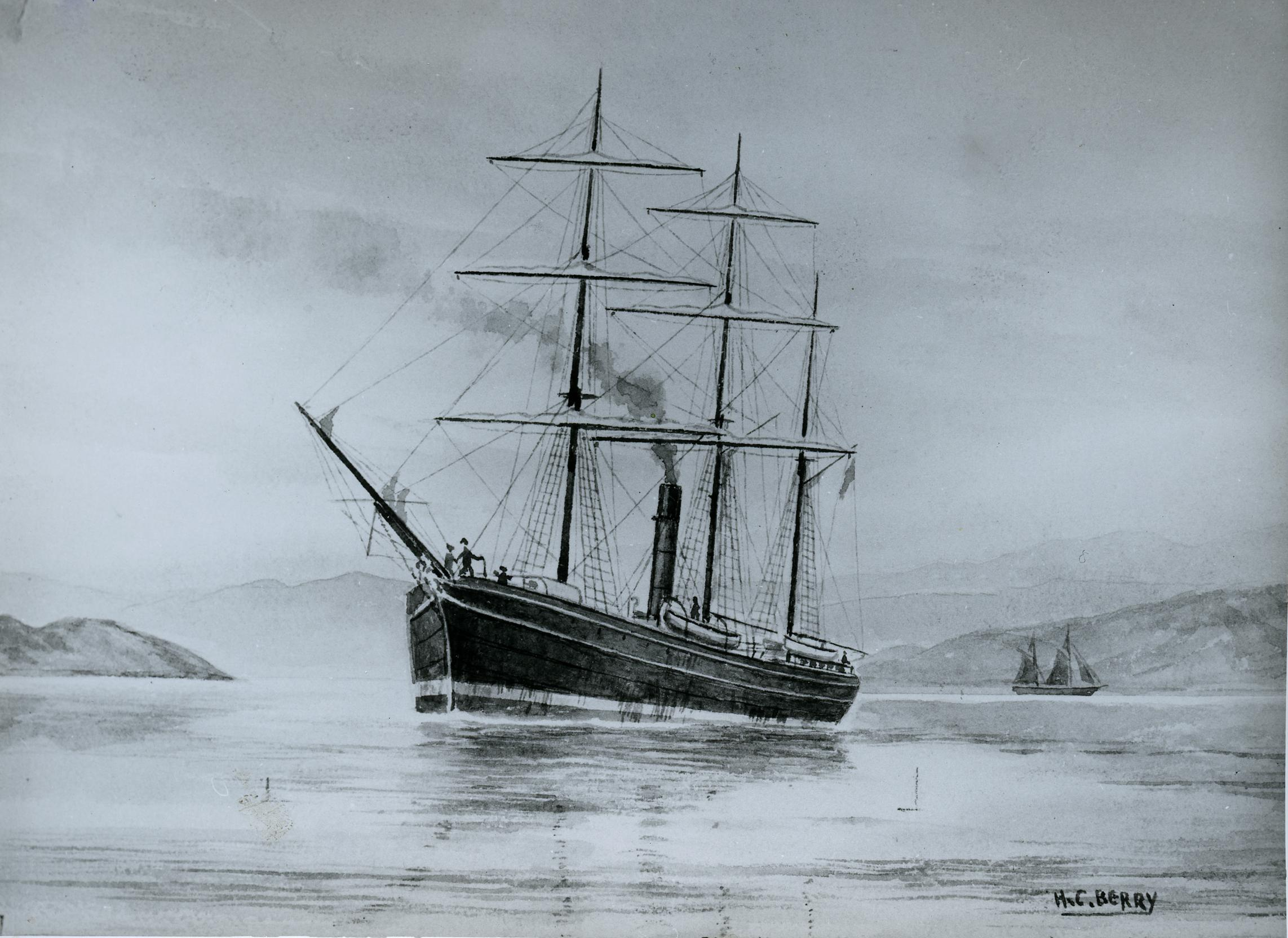
S S White Swan wrecked 29 June 1862 en route from Napier to Wellington

Dannevirke, the modern service town for Ākitio, is located 74 km inland from the coast, and is about an hour by car.

In living memory, the journey into Dannevirke would take three hours, with coastal families making the trip 'to town' infrequently - staying for several days at a time in the local Hotel located where Dannevirke's KFC is presently situated. Before this, Steamer travel to Wellington or Napier was the preferred route to civilisation; although an active local community flourished, and more than five rugby teams were competing for local bragging rights at the peak of labour-force employment.

Although travel by sea is no longer a routine necessity for residents, Ākitio's connection to the river and the ocean has continued into the late 20th century through multi-sport events, as well as the sport of ocean racing (see below).

== Sport and community ==
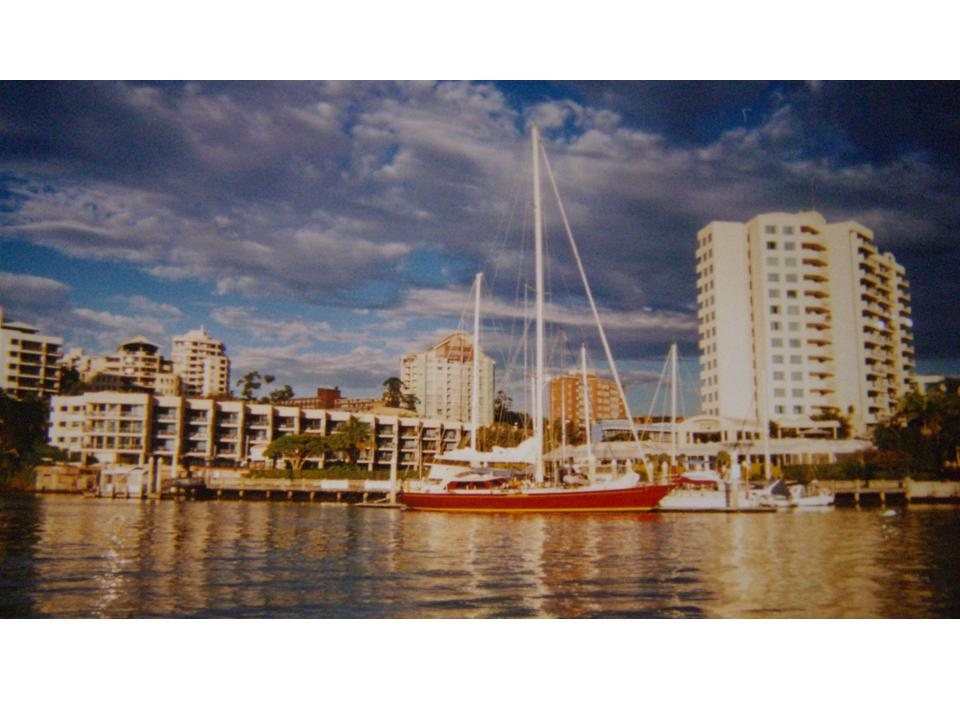
Condor of Bermuda, Brisbane, QLD 2003

- Notable rugby union players of the contemporary era are brothers Brad and Clint Newland, residing during their youth at Akitio Station.

In addition to Rugby Union, the Akitio Station Cricket Ground also hosted the English Cricket team, as Mr Armstrong, owner of the Akitio Estate, was a well-connected man with a keen interest in the sport.

=== National teams ===
Bridget Kight, of Akitio Station (great-granddaughter to Mr Armstrong), played internationally for New Zealand's Black Sticks Women's Hockey team (2006–2008); and sister Charlotte Kight is a current (2009) member of the national Silver Ferns Netball team.

The Akitio Challenge, an event first run in 1990 contributes to the local school's (Est. 1893) endowment fund; although more recently provides funding for other community projects as well. The school closed in 2014.

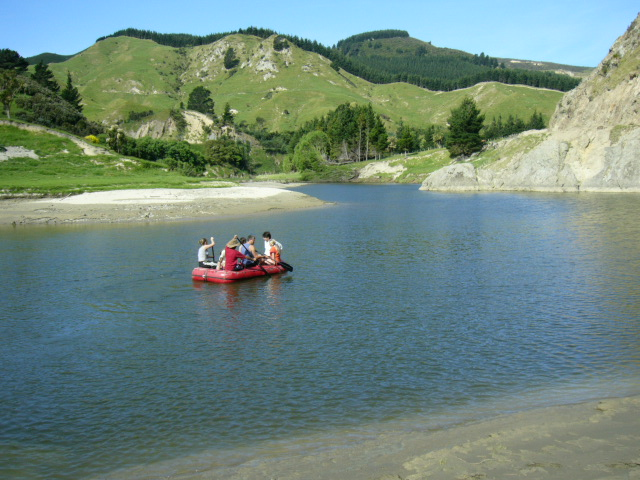
River rafting on the Ākitio River

=== Water sports ===
The first several "Akitio Challenge" events caught the attention of the national news media when participation was promoted through a lottery prize draw for a ten-day luxury cruising vacation on the famous ex-maxi yacht, Condor of Bermuda; to be taken anywhere in the South Pacific.

=== Sports and social clubs ===
On a less formal tone, the Annual Akitio [motor] Bike Ride proves to be a popular event with the locals, and a keen chance to share and compare notes on stock performance and pasture management across the region.

== Industry ==
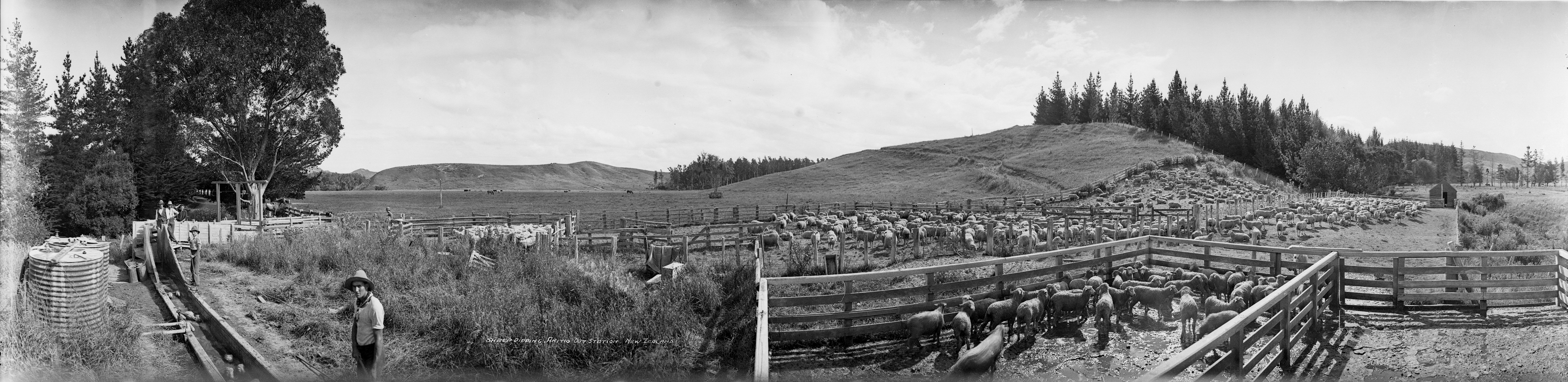
Dipping sheep, Ākitio, 1920s

Ākitio is primarily a farming district, specialising in sheep and beef production. Additional local industries are the crayfish; with annual quotas, and storage tanks at the Akitio Station Airfield, earth works, and limited boat repairs/shipwright services.

With a permanent population fluctuating somewhere between 30 and 300 persons, the predominant labour force participation statistics are gathered from those working outside the village.

== Public facilities ==
Opposite the site of the last (of three) remaining landing sheds is the Akitio Point Camping Ground, and the Akitio Surf Beach.

Occupying the prime location, and incorporating the local surf lifesaving facilities, is the Akitio Boat Club, which has included members such as Condor campaigner, Bob Bell.

The Community Centre, fire station, and public ablution facilities are located opposite the local primary school in the centre of the community, about 2.5 km from the Akitio Homesteads, and about 1 km from the end of the 'point'.

The sealing of the road to Ākitio from Dannevirke was completed around 1997.

== Climate ==
Climate data for Akitio (1991–2020)
Month	Jan	Feb	Mar	Apr	May	Jun	Jul	Aug	Sep	Oct	Nov	Dec	Year
Mean daily maximum °C (°F)	20.2 (68.4)	20.6 (69.1)	18.6 (65.5)	16.3 (61.3)	14.2 (57.6)	11.6 (52.9)	11.1 (52.0)	11.6 (52.9)	12.9 (55.2)	14.6 (58.3)	16.5 (61.7)	18.6 (65.5)	15.6 (60.0)
Daily mean °C (°F)	16.2 (61.2)	16.8 (62.2)	15.0 (59.0)	13.1 (55.6)	11.2 (52.2)	8.9 (48.0)	8.4 (47.1)	8.8 (47.8)	9.8 (49.6)	11.2 (52.2)	12.8 (55.0)	14.8 (58.6)	12.3 (54.0)
Mean daily minimum °C (°F)	12.3 (54.1)	12.9 (55.2)	11.4 (52.5)	9.9 (49.8)	8.1 (46.6)	6.2 (43.2)	5.8 (42.4)	5.9 (42.6)	6.7 (44.1)	7.9 (46.2)	9.1 (48.4)	11.1 (52.0)	8.9 (48.1)
Mean monthly sunshine hours	254.1	227.3	201.4	169.6	165.4	123.6	143.9	142.4	174.3	215.2	230.0	229.1	2,276.3
Source: NIWA
