= Tararua Health Group =

Healthcare provider in New Zealand

- Type: Private
- Industry: Health care
- Incorporated: September 2008; 18 years ago
- Headquarters: Dannevirke
- Website: thg.org.nz

Tararua Health Group Limited is a healthcare organisation that provides healthcare services across the Tararua District in New Zealand, including general practice, midwifery, radiology, and acute care.

They have been subject to an audit by the Ministry of Health, the details of which are yet to be fully released. OmniHealth, whose clinics are owned through the Tararua Health Group, is currently under investigation by Te Whatu Ora. The Pahīatua Medical Centre, formerly owned by the company, has been sold to a local Iwi.
