= Mayor of Pahiatua =

The mayor of Pahiatua officiated over the Pahiatua Borough in New Zealand. The borough was administered by the Pahiatua Borough Council. The initial office existed from 1892 until 1989, when Pahiatua Borough amalgamated into the Tararua District as part of the 1989 local government reforms. There have been 18 mayors of Pahiatua.

== List of mayors ==
	Name	Term
1	Job Vile	1892–1893
2	G.H. Smith	1893–1894
(1)	Job Vile	1894–1895
3	David Crewe	1895–1896
(1)	Job Vile	1896–1897
4	J.D. Wilson	1897–1901
5	J. Burrows	1901–1902
6	W. Tosswill	1902–1904
(3)	David Crewe	1904-1910
7	William Wilson McCardle	1910–1912
(3)	David Crewe	1912–1913
9	Jonas Crewe	1913-1921
10	J.D. Wilson	1921–1924
(9)	Jonas Crewe	1924–1929
(10)	J.D. Wilson	1929–1938
13	S.K. Siddells	1938–1942
14	S.J. Judd	1942-1953
15	Bill Carthew	1953–1959
16	Joseph Terry	1959-1971
17	R.D. Matthews	1971–1983
18	Chester Burt	1983–1989

== See also ==
- List of former territorial authorities in New Zealand
