= Cape Turnagain =

Headland on the North Island of New Zealand

Cape Turnagain Māori: Te Aho a Māui
- Cape
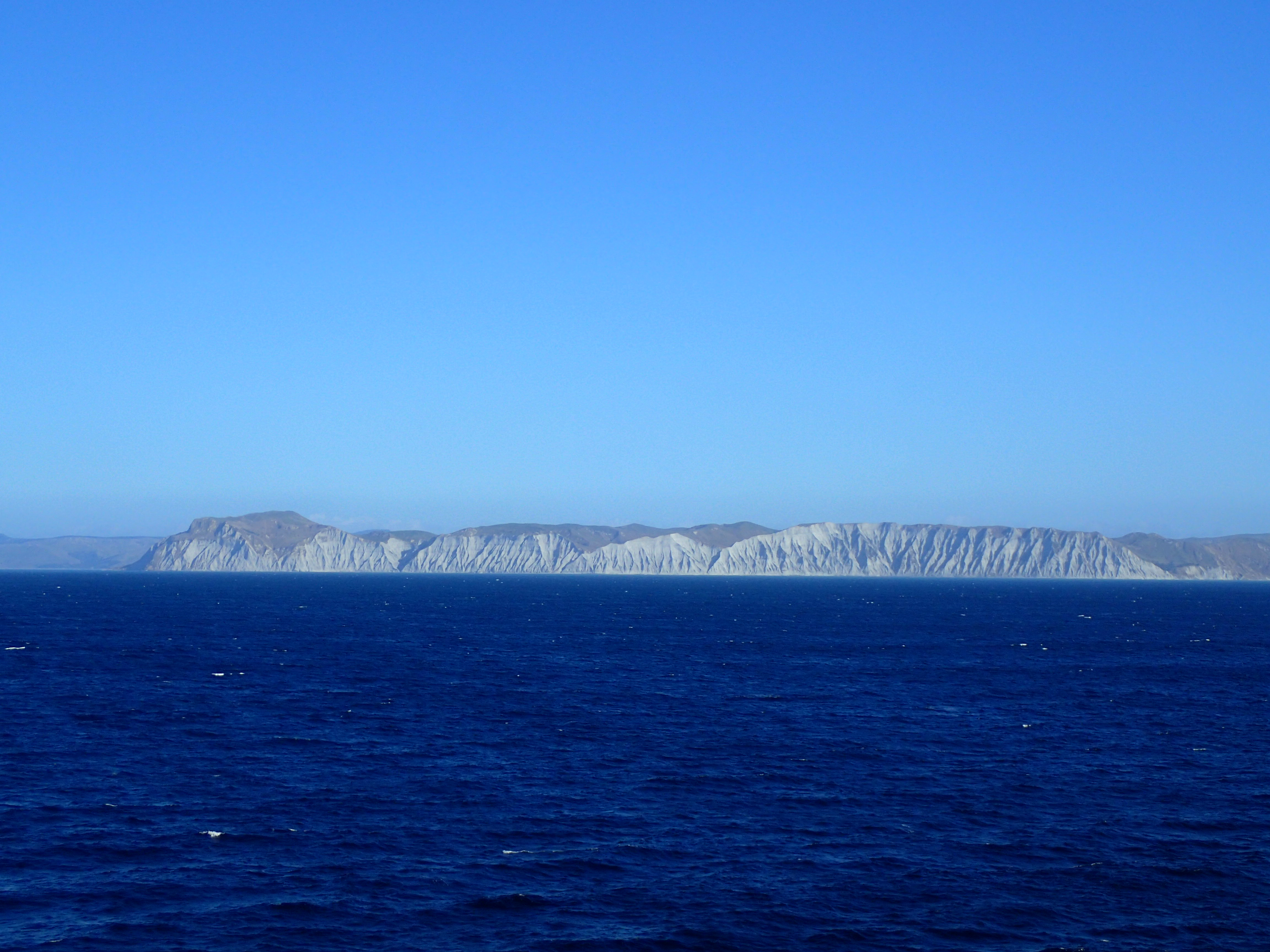
- Cape Turnagain as seen from the north-east

- Location within New Zealand
- Coordinates: 40.4916°S 176.6173°E
- Water bodies: South Pacific Ocean

Cape Turnagain is a prominent headland on the east coast of New Zealand's North Island, part way between Hawke Bay and Cook Strait, between the mouths of the Pōrangahau and Ākitio Rivers.

== Geography ==
It is the eastern most point of the Tararua District, part of the Manawatu-Wanganui Region, access via Herbertville. Cape Turnagain is 650 kilometres (400 mi) north-west of Chatham Island, making it the nearest point of mainland New Zealand to Chatham Island.

The cape is one of the windiest places in New Zealand, frequently recording annual extremes for wind speed. Winds gusts of over 200 km/h (120 mph) have been recorded many times. The highest gusts that have been recorded include 246 km/h (153 mph) on 17 September 2023, 252 km/h (157 mph) on 21 October 2025, and 270 km/h (170 mph) on 10 April 2018.

== History ==
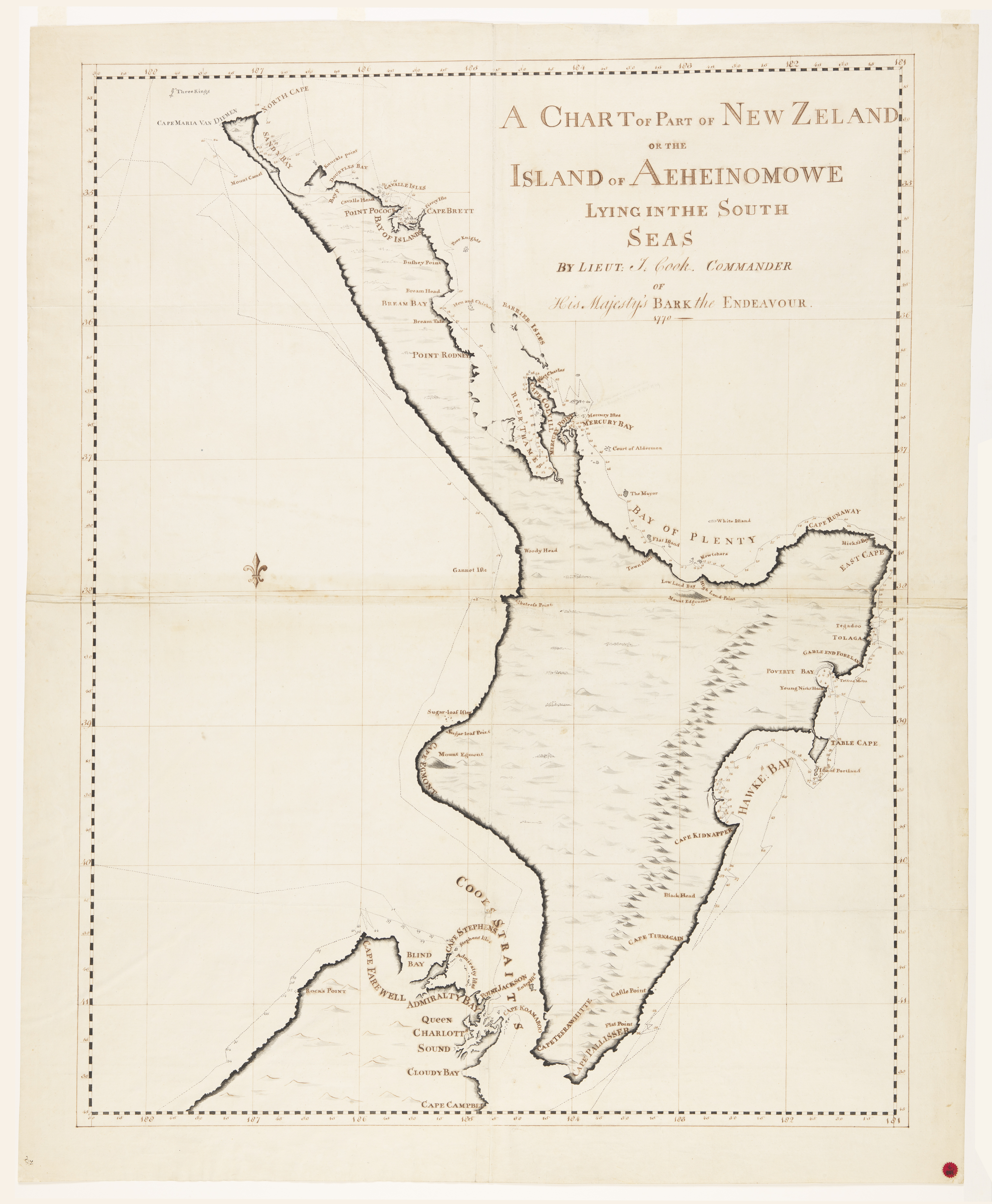
Chart by James Cook – with the Turnaround course marked

The Māori name for Cape Turnagain is Te Aho a Māui, which means "Māui's fishing line", in reference to the Māori mythology story of Māui and his brothers fishing up the land mass now known as the North Island.

The cape was named by Captain James Cook in 1769. On his journey of discovery, he sailed south to this point where he was met with atrocious sea conditions, typical of the area. Being unable to safely proceed, he decided to turn and head north and sailed anticlockwise around the North Island of New Zealand and upon reaching the same place turned again southwards and named the point as a result of his decision.

== Climate ==
Climate data for Cape Turnagain (1991–2020)
Month	Jan	Feb	Mar	Apr	May	Jun	Jul	Aug	Sep	Oct	Nov	Dec	Year
Mean daily maximum °C (°F)	18.4 (65.1)	18.5 (65.3)	16.9 (62.4)	15.0 (59.0)	13.2 (55.8)	11.0 (51.8)	10.1 (50.2)	10.5 (50.9)	11.9 (53.4)	13.5 (56.3)	14.8 (58.6)	16.8 (62.2)	14.2 (57.6)
Daily mean °C (°F)	15.9 (60.6)	16.2 (61.2)	14.8 (58.6)	13.1 (55.6)	11.3 (52.3)	9.2 (48.6)	8.4 (47.1)	8.7 (47.7)	9.8 (49.6)	11.2 (52.2)	12.3 (54.1)	14.4 (57.9)	12.1 (53.8)
Mean daily minimum °C (°F)	13.4 (56.1)	13.9 (57.0)	12.7 (54.9)	11.3 (52.3)	9.5 (49.1)	7.5 (45.5)	6.7 (44.1)	6.9 (44.4)	7.8 (46.0)	8.8 (47.8)	9.9 (49.8)	12.0 (53.6)	10.0 (50.1)
Source: NIWA
