= Alfredton, New Zealand =

Alfredton
- Locality
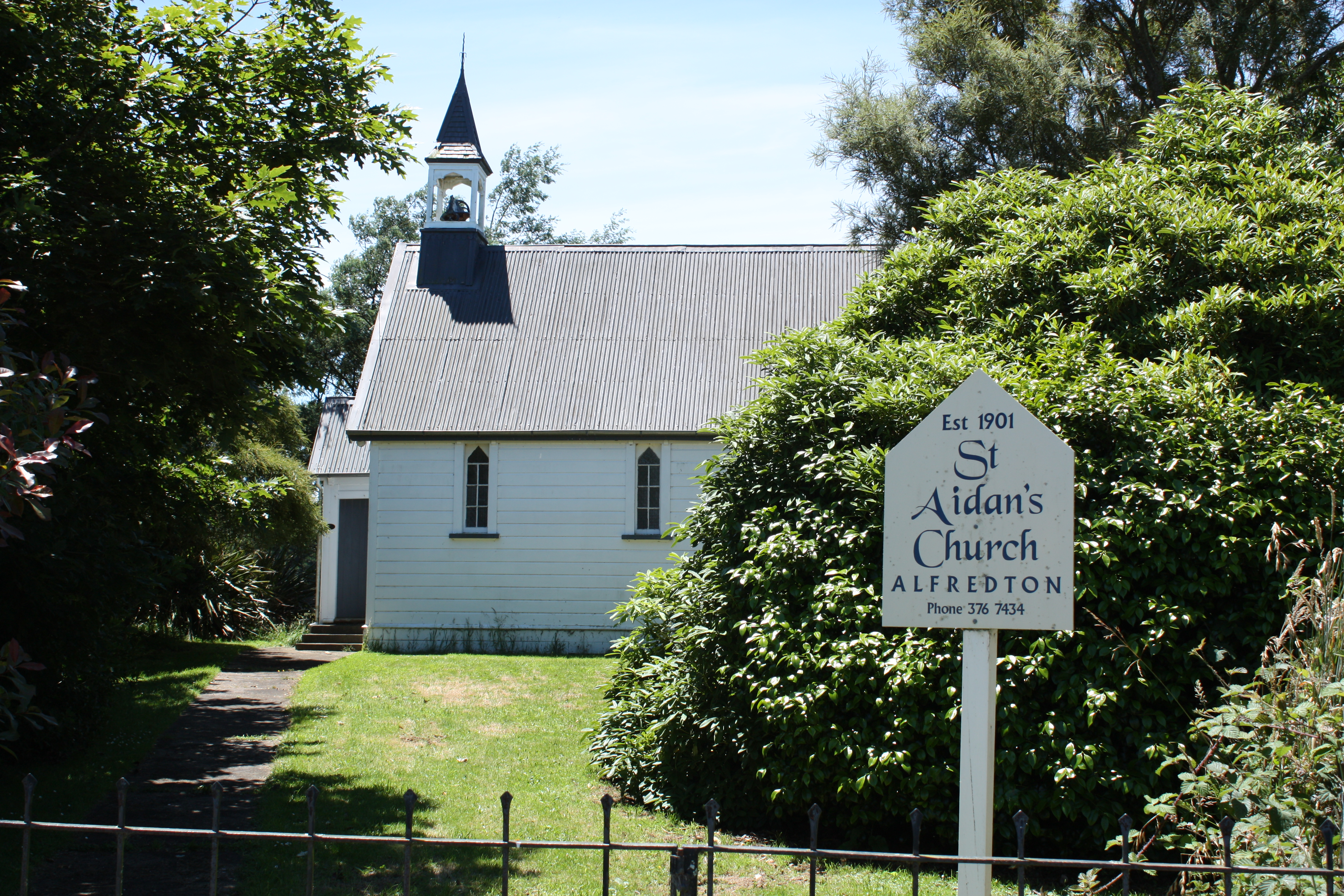
- The former St Aidan's Church at Alfredton is registered by Heritage New Zealand as a Category II structure, with registration number 3972
- Interactive map of Alfredton
- Coordinates: 40.6798°S 175.8601°E
- Country: New Zealand
- Region: Manawatū-Whanganui
- Territorial authority: Tararua District
- Ward: South Tararua General Ward; Tamaki nui-a Rua Maori Ward
- Community: Eketahuna Community
- Electorates: Wairarapa; Ikaroa-Rāwhiti (Māori)

Government
  - Territorial Authority: Tararua District Council
  - Regional council: Horizons Regional Council
  - Tararua Mayor: Scott Gilmore
  - Wairarapa MP: Mike Butterick
  - Ikaroa-Rāwhiti MP: Cushla Tangaere-Manuel

Area
  - Total: 184.52 km^{2} (71.24 sq mi)

Population (2023 census)
  - Total: 165
  - Density: 0.894/km^{2} (2.32/sq mi)

Alfredton is a farming community in the southern North Island of New Zealand. It is located to the southeast of Eketāhuna.

Alfredton has a school, church, a now closed 9-hole golf course, community domain and a community hall.

The town is named after Prince Alfred, Duke of Saxe-Coburg and Gotha who was the second son and fourth child of Queen Victoria.

== Demographics ==
Alfredton locality covers 184.52 km^{2} (71.24 sq mi). It is part of the larger Nireaha-Eketāhuna statistical area.

Historical population
Year	Pop.	±% p.a.
2006	162	—
2013	165	+0.26%
2018	162	−0.37%
2023	165	+0.37%

Alfredton had a population of 165 in the 2023 New Zealand census, an increase of 3 people (1.9%) since the 2018 census, and unchanged since the 2013 census. There were 84 males and 78 females in 60 dwellings. 3.6% of people identified as LGBTIQ+. The median age was 33.5 years (compared with 38.1 years nationally). There were 36 people (21.8%) aged under 15 years, 39 (23.6%) aged 15 to 29, 69 (41.8%) aged 30 to 64, and 18 (10.9%) aged 65 or older.

People could identify as more than one ethnicity. The results were 92.7% European (Pākehā); 16.4% Māori; 1.8% Asian; and 1.8% Middle Eastern, Latin American and African New Zealanders (MELAA). English was spoken by 98.2%, Māori by 1.8%, and other languages by 5.5%. No language could be spoken by 1.8% (e.g. too young to talk). The percentage of people born overseas was 9.1, compared with 28.8% nationally.

Religious affiliations were 21.8% Christian, and 1.8% Buddhist. People who answered that they had no religion were 67.3%, and 7.3% of people did not answer the census question.

Of those at least 15 years old, 36 (27.9%) people had a bachelor's or higher degree, 69 (53.5%) had a post-high school certificate or diploma, and 24 (18.6%) people exclusively held high school qualifications. The median income was $43,500, compared with $41,500 nationally. 15 people (11.6%) earned over $100,000 compared to 12.1% nationally. The employment status of those at least 15 was 75 (58.1%) full-time, 24 (18.6%) part-time, and 3 (2.3%) unemployed.

== Education ==
Alfredton School is a co-educational state primary school for Year 1 to 8 students, with a roll of 24 as of July 2026. It opened in 1887.

== Climate ==
Climate data for Alfredton (1991–2020)
Month	Jan	Feb	Mar	Apr	May	Jun	Jul	Aug	Sep	Oct	Nov	Dec	Year
Mean daily maximum °C (°F)	22.4 (72.3)	23.0 (73.4)	21.0 (69.8)	18.1 (64.6)	15.3 (59.5)	12.5 (54.5)	12.1 (53.8)	13.0 (55.4)	14.7 (58.5)	16.5 (61.7)	18.4 (65.1)	20.9 (69.6)	17.3 (63.2)
Daily mean °C (°F)	16.9 (62.4)	17.3 (63.1)	15.5 (59.9)	12.9 (55.2)	10.6 (51.1)	8.0 (46.4)	7.9 (46.2)	8.4 (47.1)	10.3 (50.5)	12.2 (54.0)	13.5 (56.3)	15.7 (60.3)	12.4 (54.4)
Mean daily minimum °C (°F)	11.5 (52.7)	11.7 (53.1)	10.0 (50.0)	7.8 (46.0)	5.8 (42.4)	3.5 (38.3)	3.7 (38.7)	3.9 (39.0)	5.8 (42.4)	7.9 (46.2)	8.7 (47.7)	10.4 (50.7)	7.6 (45.6)
Average rainfall mm (inches)	76 (3.0)	58 (2.3)	73 (2.9)	97 (3.8)	127 (5.0)	122 (4.8)	141 (5.6)	118 (4.6)	101 (4.0)	103 (4.1)	91 (3.6)	108 (4.3)	1,215 (48)
Source: NIWA (rain 1951–1980)
