= Weber, New Zealand =

Weber
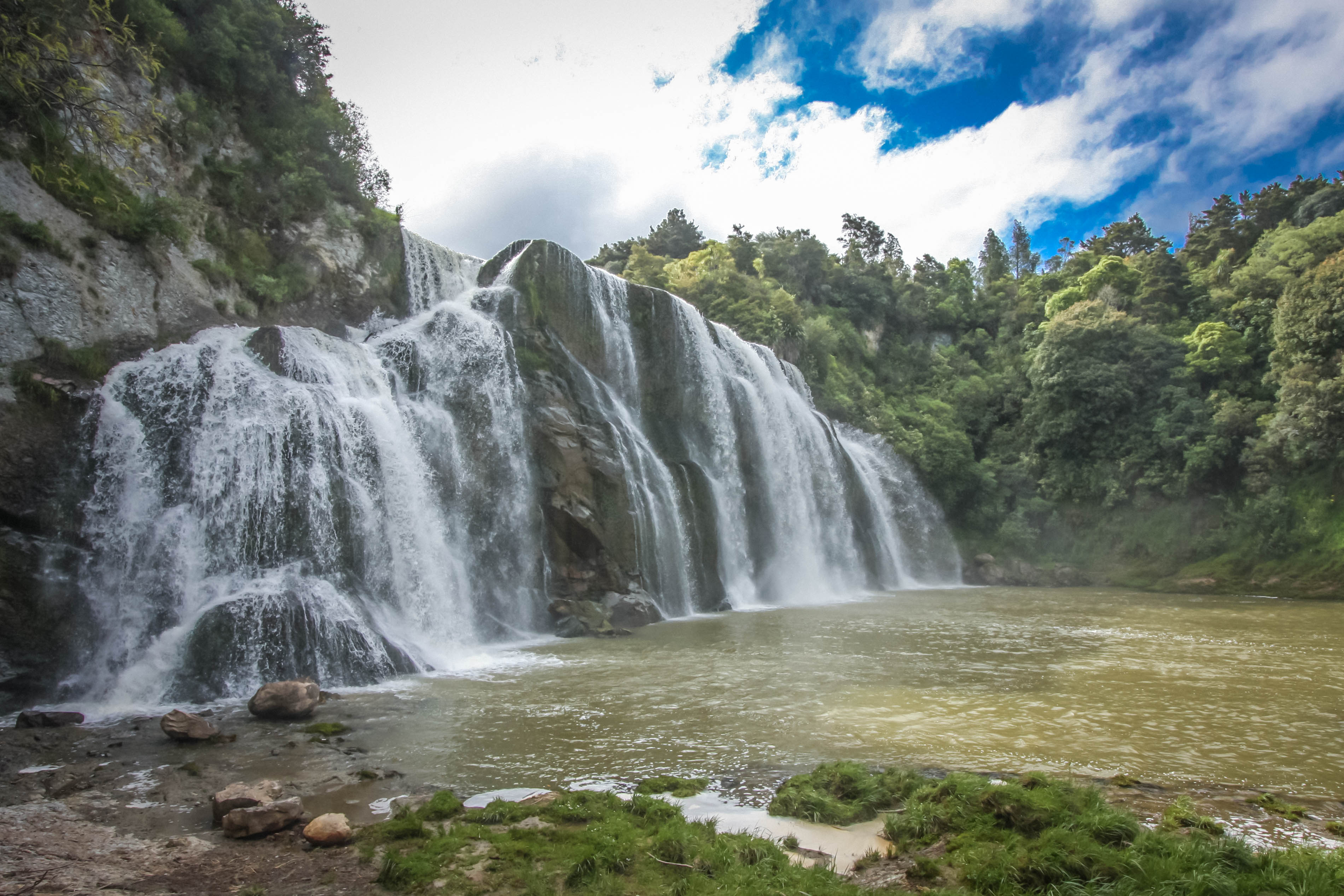
- Waihi Falls
- Interactive map of Weber
- Coordinates: 40°24′05″S 176°18′40″E
- Country: New Zealand
- Region: Manawatū-Whanganui
- Territorial authority: Tararua District
- Ward: North Tararua General Ward; Tamaki nui-a Rua Maori Ward
- Community: Dannevirke Community
- Electorates: Wairarapa; Ikaroa-Rāwhiti (Māori)

Government
  - Territorial Authority: Tararua District Council
  - Regional council: Horizons Regional Council
  - Tararua Mayor: Scott Gilmore
  - Wairarapa MP: Mike Butterick
  - Ikaroa-Rāwhiti MP: Cushla Tangaere-Manuel

Area
  - Total: 233.92 km^{2} (90.32 sq mi)

Population (2023 census)
  - Total: 135
  - Density: 0.577/km^{2} (1.49/sq mi)

Weber is a village situated 28 km south-east of Dannevirke and 23 km west-northwest of Herbertville, on the east coast of New Zealand. Weber was named after the German born surveyor Charles H. Weber (*1830) who died during a surveying project near Woodville in 1886. His body was only found three years after his disappearance.

Weber is just off the former State Highway 52. This is a scenic tourist route between Waipukurau and Eketāhuna which also runs past the place with the world's longest place name, Taumatawhakatangihangakoauauotamateapokaiwhenuakitanatahu. A short distance from Weber are the Waihi Falls. Weber had a cemetery, located approximately 2 km to the west of the settlement. It contains around 51 burial plots with just under half of those being aged 13 or under. A recent, (2013), memorial to those buried there has been erected alongside the main road into Weber.

Weber is the exact antipode for the Spanish capital Madrid.

== History ==
The settlement was founded the late 19th century as an overnight stop for coach teams on the journey to and from the coast. This was the distance a team of 6 horses and a coach could travel in one day.

At the turn of the century it was a thriving small community. It had a police station and one cell jail, a large hotel, shops and a post office. Today it consists of a church, a school, a pub, a rural fire depot, a community centre and several houses.

Wises index of every place in NZ (1897) describes Weber as, WEBER, Hawke's Bay. On Ākitio River; in Waipawa County; 104 m south from Napier. Rail to Dannevirke, thence coach Monday, Wednesday, and Friday, 25 m (10s). Daily service in summer. Grazing and sawmilling. Good shooting, game of all kinds in season. Cycle roads fair only; the Ākitio River falls reached on horseback, great attraction. One hotel; private board 25s. Post and telegraph office, called after the first surveyor of the township. Resident doctor. Is the name of a county. A recent (2013) memorial to the Weber cemetery was erected alongside a paper road some 2 km west of the settlement.

In 1990, Weber was the epicentre for a large earthquake. The local geology of the area magnified the effect making the earthquake seem worse than it was. It is known locally as the "Mother's Day earthquake" as it occurred during Mother's Day.

During the two world wars the local population of Weber lost a great number of its men. Weber has a permanent war memorial. The first ANZAC parade in 50 years took place in 2010.

== Demographics ==
Weber locality covers 233.92 km^{2} (90.32 sq mi). It is part of the larger Owahanga statistical area.

Historical population
Year	Pop.	±% p.a.
2006	156	—
2013	123	−3.34%
2018	129	+0.96%
2023	135	+0.91%

Weber had a population of 135 in the 2023 New Zealand census, an increase of 6 people (4.7%) since the 2018 census, and an increase of 12 people (9.8%) since the 2013 census. There were 66 males and 72 females in 45 dwellings. 2.2% of people identified as LGBTIQ+. The median age was 31.3 years (compared with 38.1 years nationally). There were 42 people (31.1%) aged under 15 years, 21 (15.6%) aged 15 to 29, 63 (46.7%) aged 30 to 64, and 6 (4.4%) aged 65 or older.

People could identify as more than one ethnicity. The results were 95.6% European (Pākehā); 26.7% Māori; 2.2% Asian; and 2.2% Middle Eastern, Latin American and African New Zealanders (MELAA). English was spoken by 100.0%, Māori by 2.2%, and other languages by 2.2%. No language could be spoken by 2.2% (e.g. too young to talk). The percentage of people born overseas was 6.7, compared with 28.8% nationally.

The sole religious affiliation given was 15.6% Christian. People who answered that they had no religion were 62.2%, and 22.2% of people did not answer the census question.

Of those at least 15 years old, 18 (19.4%) people had a bachelor's or higher degree, 57 (61.3%) had a post-high school certificate or diploma, and 24 (25.8%) people exclusively held high school qualifications. The median income was $45,000, compared with $41,500 nationally. 6 people (6.5%) earned over $100,000 compared to 12.1% nationally. The employment status of those at least 15 was 54 (58.1%) full-time, 12 (12.9%) part-time, and 3 (3.2%) unemployed.

== Education ==
Weber School is a co-educational state primary school for Year 1 to 8 students, with a roll of 32 as of July 2026. The school opened in 1894.
