= Herbertville =

- Interactive map of Herbertville
- Coordinates: 40.491°S 176.558°E
- Country: New Zealand
- Region: Manawatū-Whanganui
- Territorial authority: Tararua District

Herbertville, earlier known as Wainui after the Wainui River, is a small settlement on the east coast of the North Island of New Zealand, in the Tararua District and the Manawatū-Whanganui region. It lies just south of Cape Turnagain, a promontory named by Captain Cook, who used the location as a well-remembered point where he turned his ship and retraced his journey. As of 2023, its population is around 120.

The settlement was named for Joseph and Sarah Herbert, a farming couple who settled in the area in 1842. By the turn of the 20th century Herbertville was a thriving community. It had a large hotel, several shops, a police station, and a blacksmith. Schooners beached on the vast expanse of shallow sandy beach on high tides and passengers and cargoes were unloaded. The ships would refloat on the next high tide and continue on their way. Horse-drawn coaches connected the settlement with the township of Dannevirke via Weber.

Herbertville is renowned for its strong winds. In mid-September 2023 it recorded a gust of 246 kmh, the strongest gust ever recorded in New Zealand.

== Education ==
Herbertville School opened in 1885 or earlier and merged into Wimbledon School in 1960.
