= Pongaroa =

Settlement in Manawatū-Whanganui, New Zealand

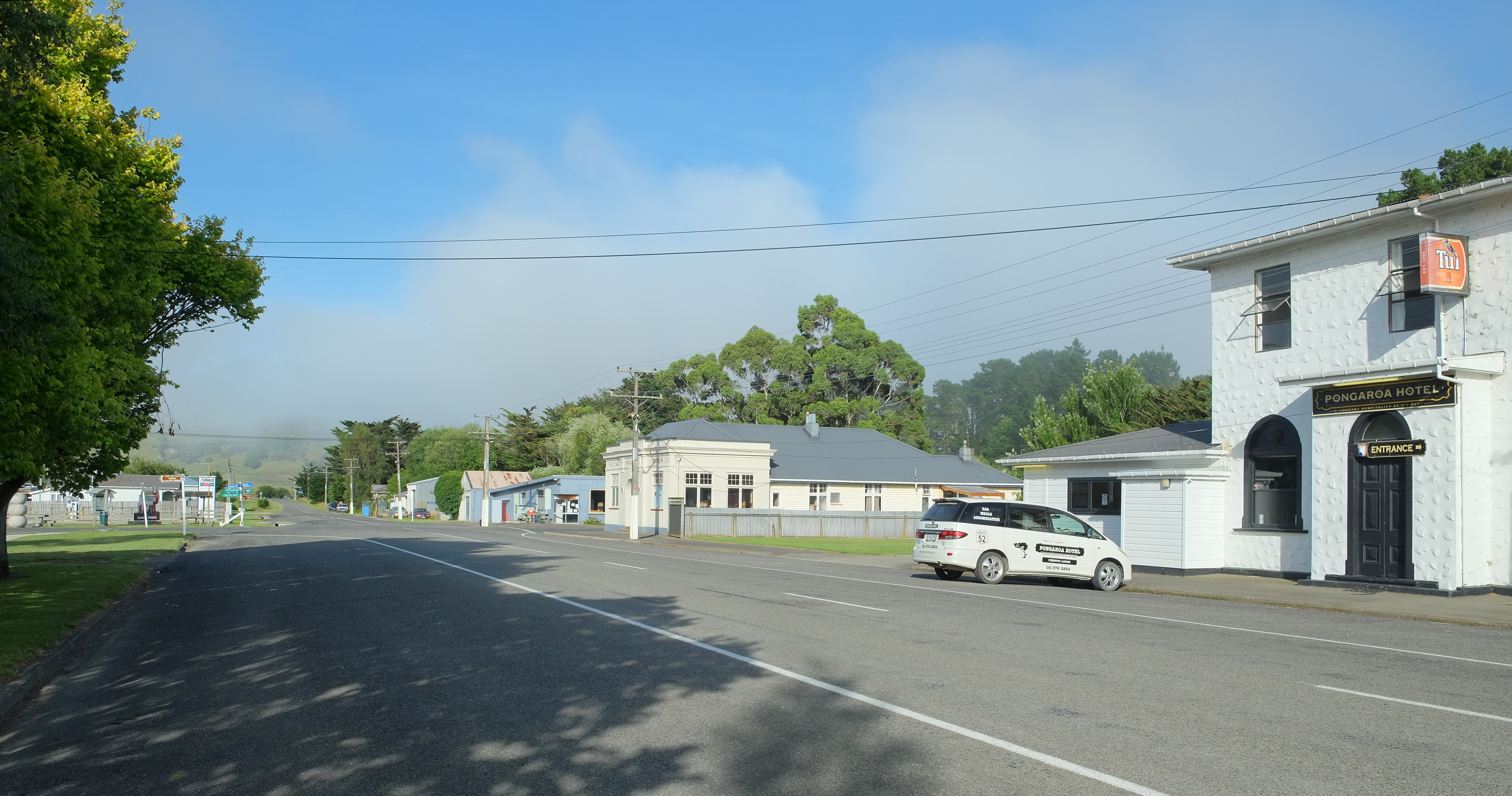
- Pongaroa Main Street (route 52), looking north
- Interactive map of Pongaroa
- Coordinates: 40.543°S 176.191°E
- Country: New Zealand
- Region: Manawatū-Whanganui
- Territorial authority: Tararua District
- Ward: North Tararua General Ward; Tamaki nui-a Rua Maori Ward
- Community: Dannevirke Community
- Electorates: Wairarapa; Ikaroa-Rāwhiti (Māori)

Government
  - Territorial Authority: Tararua District Council
  - Regional council: Horizons Regional Council
  - Tararua Mayor: Scott Gilmore
  - Wairarapa MP: Mike Butterick
  - Ikaroa-Rāwhiti MP: Cushla Tangaere-Manuel

Area
  - Total: 1.09 km^{2} (0.42 sq mi)

Population (June 2025)
  - Total: 90
  - Density: 83/km^{2} (210/sq mi)
- Postcode: 4991

Pongaroa is a town in the Tararua District, in the southeast of the North Island of New Zealand, 110 kilometres southwest of Hastings and 200 kilometres northeast of Wellington. The nearest town is Pahiatua, 50 kilometres to the west. Popular Ākitio Beach is 30 kilometres to the east. The township straddles Route 52, a road between Masterton and Waipukurau.

The New Zealand Ministry for Culture and Heritage gives a translation of "tall tree fern" for Pongaroa.

Pongaroa village has a population of about 100, with the surrounding farms bringing the total population to about 300. The area is serviced by Pongaroa School, Pongaroa General Store, Pongaroa Hotel, and Pongaroa Farm Centre. Pongaroa is also the location of the New Zealand Centre for Equine Psychology and Behaviour and Wildside Farm environmental education retreat.

Local volunteers have been responsible for the public toilets, the establishment of a freedom campsite, and improvements to the village centre.

Historically, Pongaroa belonged in the northern Wairarapa area. At one time during the early settlement years in the latter half of the 19th century, the township was much larger: people expected that the Masterton-Napier Railway would run through Pongaroa. However, eventually the Wairarapa Line cut through Pahiatua (1897) and thus that township grew, whilst Pongaroa remained a farming community. Pongaroa became an administrative centre of Akitio County, which functioned between 1899 and 1976.

Pāpāuma marae, a marae (tribal meeting ground) of the Rangitāne tribes and its Ngāti Mutuahi, Ngāti Pakapaka and Te Hika a Pāpāuma hapū (sub-tribes), is located in the Pangaoroa area. It includes Te Aroha o Aohanga wharenui (meeting house), also known as Pāpāuma.

== Demographics ==
Pongaroa is described by Statistics New Zealand as a rural settlement, which covers 1.09 km^{2} (0.42 sq mi). It had an estimated population of 90 as of June 2025, with a population density of 83 people per km^{2}. It is part of the larger Owhanga statistical area.

Historical population for Pongaroa
Year	Pop.	±% p.a.
2006	117	—
2013	87	−4.14%
2018	81	−1.42%
2023	84	+0.73%

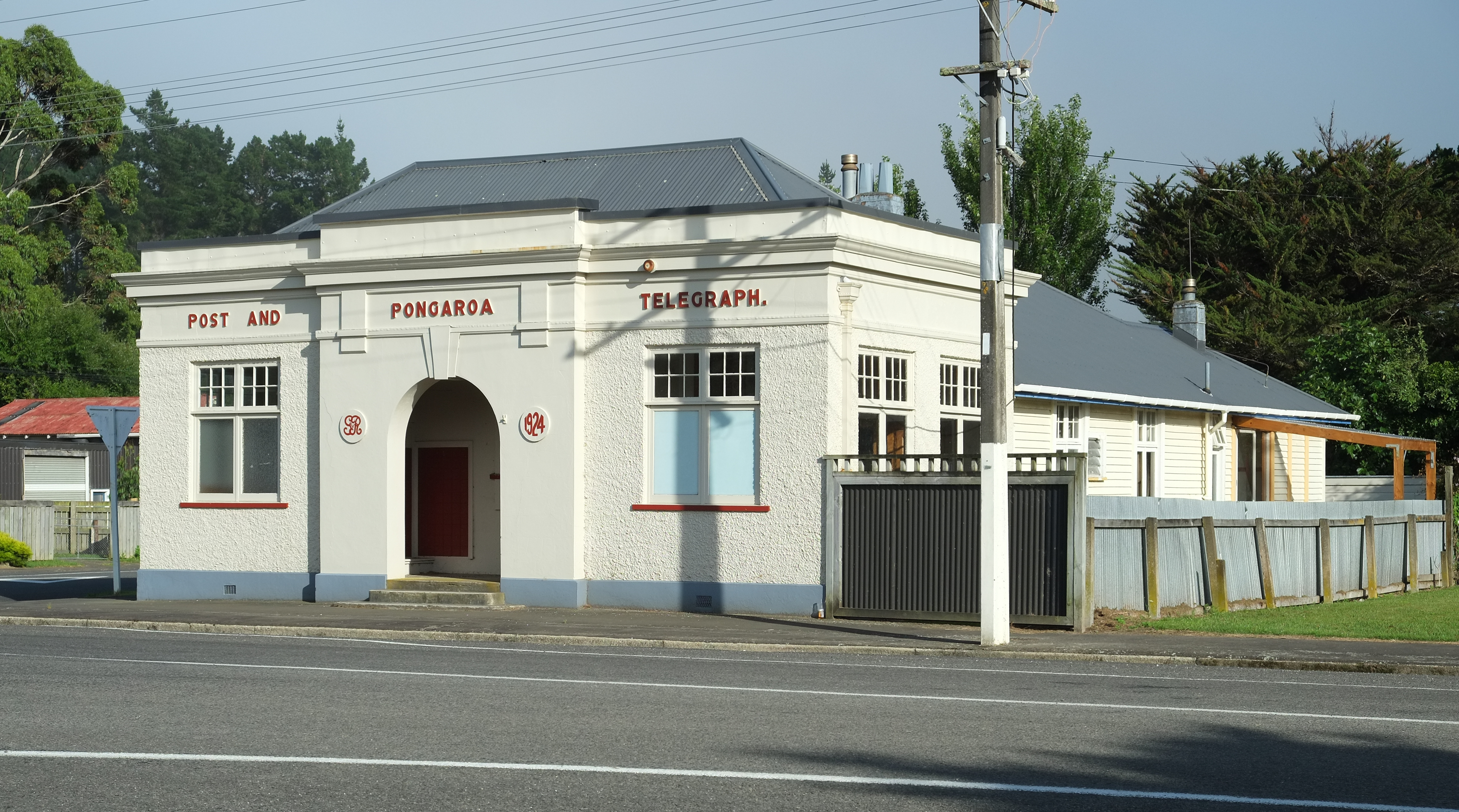
Former Pongaroa Post Office in 2022

Pongaroa had a population of 84 in the 2023 New Zealand census, an increase of 3 people (3.7%) since the 2018 census, and a decrease of 3 people (−3.4%) since the 2013 census. There were 45 males and 42 females in 48 dwellings. The median age was 57.3 years (compared with 38.1 years nationally). There were 9 people (10.7%) aged under 15 years, 6 (7.1%) aged 15 to 29, 39 (46.4%) aged 30 to 64, and 33 (39.3%) aged 65 or older.

People could identify as more than one ethnicity. The results were 82.1% European (Pākehā), 35.7% Māori, and 7.1% other, which includes people giving their ethnicity as "New Zealander". English was spoken by 100.0%, Māori by 7.1%, and other languages by 3.6%. New Zealand Sign Language was known by 3.6%. None of the people were born overseas, compared with 28.8% nationally.

Religious affiliations were 39.3% Christian, 3.6% Māori religious beliefs, and 3.6% New Age. People who answered that they had no religion were 50.0%, and 7.1% of people did not answer the census question.

Of those at least 15 years old, 6 (8.0%) people had a bachelor's or higher degree, 36 (48.0%) had a post-high school certificate or diploma, and 33 (44.0%) people exclusively held high school qualifications. The median income was $26,800, compared with $41,500 nationally. 3 people (4.0%) earned over $100,000 compared to 12.1% nationally. The employment status of those at least 15 was 33 (44.0%) full-time, 9 (12.0%) part-time, and 3 (4.0%) unemployed.

=== Owahanga ===
Owahanga statistical area covers 1,142.54 km^{2} (441.14 sq mi) and had an estimated population of 740 as of June 2025, with a population density of 0.65 people per km^{2}.

Historical population for Owahanga statistical area
Year	Pop.	±% p.a.
2006	825	—
2013	717	−1.98%
2018	750	+0.90%
2023	720	−0.81%

Owahanga had a population of 720 in the 2023 New Zealand census, a decrease of 30 people (−4.0%) since the 2018 census, and an increase of 3 people (0.4%) since the 2013 census. There were 360 males and 357 females in 300 dwellings. 2.1% of people identified as LGBTIQ+. The median age was 42.8 years (compared with 38.1 years nationally). There were 168 people (23.3%) aged under 15 years, 96 (13.3%) aged 15 to 29, 330 (45.8%) aged 30 to 64, and 126 (17.5%) aged 65 or older.

People could identify as more than one ethnicity. The results were 91.2% European (Pākehā), 23.3% Māori, 2.1% Pasifika, 0.8% Asian, and 5.0% other, which includes people giving their ethnicity as "New Zealander". English was spoken by 97.9%, Māori by 3.3%, and other languages by 2.9%. No language could be spoken by 1.7% (e.g. too young to talk). New Zealand Sign Language was known by 0.4%. The percentage of people born overseas was 7.1, compared with 28.8% nationally.

Religious affiliations were 26.7% Christian, 1.7% Māori religious beliefs, 0.4% New Age, and 0.8% other religions. People who answered that they had no religion were 57.1%, and 12.9% of people did not answer the census question.

Of those at least 15 years old, 75 (13.6%) people had a bachelor's or higher degree, 327 (59.2%) had a post-high school certificate or diploma, and 153 (27.7%) people exclusively held high school qualifications. The median income was $34,000, compared with $41,500 nationally. 30 people (5.4%) earned over $100,000 compared to 12.1% nationally. The employment status of those at least 15 was 297 (53.8%) full-time, 90 (16.3%) part-time, and 12 (2.2%) unemployed.

== Education ==
Pongaroa School is a co-educational state primary school for Year 1 to 8 students, with a roll of 49 as of July 2026. It opened in 1897.

== Notable people ==
- Maurice Wilkins (1916–2004), Nobel Prizewinning scientist
