= Tararua District =

- Territorial authority district
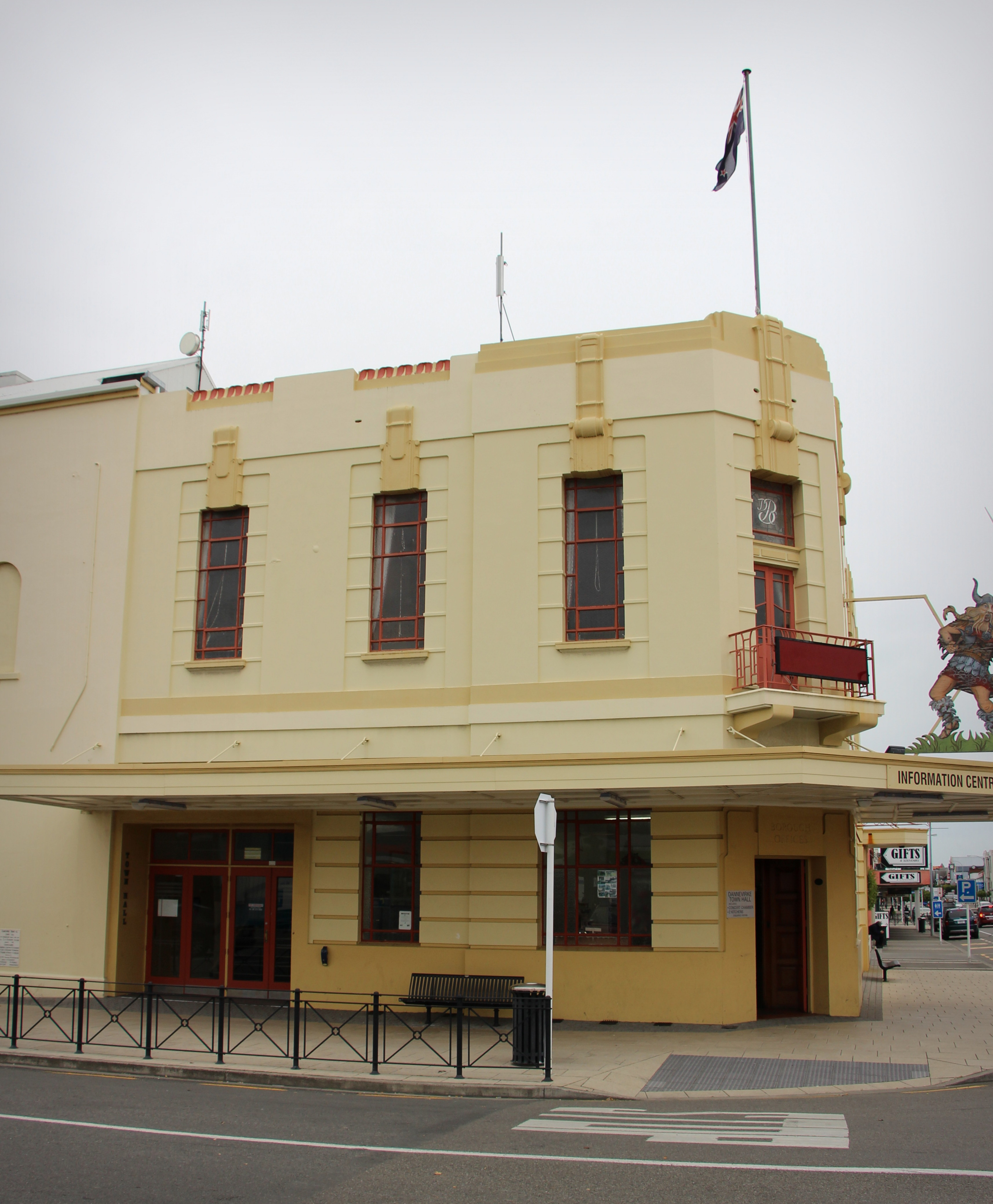
- Council Chambers and Town Hall, Dannevirke

- Tararua district within the North Island
- Coordinates: 40°24′S 176°00′E
- Country: New Zealand
- Region: Manawatū-Whanganui
- Wards: North Tararua General Ward; South Tararua General Ward; Tamaki nui-a Rua Māori Ward
- Formed: 1989
- Seat: Dannevirke

Government
  - Mayor: Scott Gilmore
  - Territorial authority: Tararua District Council

Area
  - Total: 4,364.62 km^{2} (1,685.19 sq mi)

Population (June 2025)
  - Total: 18,950
  - Density: 4.342/km^{2} (11.25/sq mi)
- Time zone: UTC+12 (NZST)
  - Summer (DST): UTC+13 (NZDT)
- Postcode(s): Map of postcodes
- Website: www.tararuadc.govt.nz

The Tararua District is a local government area near the south-east corner of New Zealand's North Island that is administered by the Tararua District Council. It has a population of 18,950 (June 2025), and an area of 4,364.62 km².

The district's northwest boundary runs along the top of the Ruahine Range; its south-east boundary is the Pacific Ocean. The catchment of the Manawatū River generally defines the north and south extremities. The catchment is also the reason the majority of the district is in the Manawatū-Whanganui Region, although traditionally many of the people of the district regard themselves as living in either Hawke's Bay (in the north) or Wairarapa (in the south).

== Towns and regional government ==
The district's chief town is Dannevirke, settled by immigrants from Denmark in the 19th century. It is also the centre for a Community Board. Other towns (from south to north along the main valleys) include Eketāhuna and Pahiatua, which have their own Community Boards, and Woodville, Ormondville, and Norsewood. Near the coast are Pongaroa, Herbertville, Ākitio, and Alfredton.

While the vast majority (98.42% by land area) of Tararua District is part of the Manawatū-Whanganui Region, a small triangle of rural land (1.58% by land area) north of the Owahanga River in the south-east of the district is part of Wellington Region. According to the 2006 Census, this area, known as Mara, has only 3 residents (down from 12 in 1996 and 2001).

== History ==
Tararua District Council was created by the amalgamation of Dannevirke Borough, Eketahuna County Council, Pahiatua Borough Council, Pahiatua County Council and Woodville District Council in the 1989 local government reforms.

=== Dannevirke County Council ===
Dannevirke County Council was formed in 1907 by splitting Waipawa County Council. It lasted until 1987, when it amalgamated with Dannevirke Borough Council to form Dannevirke District Council, which lasted 2 years until becoming part of Tararua District. Norsewood Town Board was added to DCC in 1936, Ormondville Town Board in 1944, Weber County in 1956 and Ākitio County in 1976. In its final form, DCC had five ridings, Ākitio, Weber, Mangapuaka, Norsewood and Ruahine. The County Office was at Barraud Street, Dannevirke. In 1911, it was a single storey, wooden building.

=== Woodville County Council ===
Woodville County Council was formed in 1901, also by splitting Waipawa County Council. It too lasted until 1987, when it amalgamated with Woodville Borough Council to form Woodville District Council, which also lasted 2 years until becoming part of Tararua District. Woodville County was made up of 4 ridings, Kumeroa, Maharahara, Manga-atua and Woodville, each represented by 2 councillors. The County Office was rebuilt as a 2-storey building at 49 Vogel Street, Woodville in 1903 and as a single-storey building in 1958. The building is now used by Woodville Health Centre, which is part of the Tararua Health Group. The county had the Manawatū River as its southern and eastern boundary.

== Demographics ==
Tararua District covers 4,364.62 km^{2} (1,685.19 sq mi) and had an estimated population of 18,950 as of June 2025, with a population density of 4.3 people per km^{2}.

Historical population
Year	Pop.	±% p.a.
2006	17,634	—
2013	16,854	−0.64%
2018	17,943	+1.26%
2023	18,660	+0.79%

Tararua District had a population of 18,660 in the 2023 New Zealand census, an increase of 717 people (4.0%) since the 2018 census, and an increase of 1,806 people (10.7%) since the 2013 census. There were 9,357 males, 9,252 females and 48 people of other genders in 7,356 dwellings. 2.3% of people identified as LGBTIQ+. The median age was 42.4 years (compared with 38.1 years nationally). There were 3,735 people (20.0%) aged under 15 years, 2,952 (15.8%) aged 15 to 29, 8,154 (43.7%) aged 30 to 64, and 3,819 (20.5%) aged 65 or older.

People could identify as more than one ethnicity. The results were 84.0% European (Pākehā); 26.9% Māori; 2.7% Pasifika; 3.1% Asian; 0.5% Middle Eastern, Latin American and African New Zealanders (MELAA); and 2.8% other, which includes people giving their ethnicity as "New Zealander". English was spoken by 97.6%, Māori language by 5.1%, Samoan by 0.3% and other languages by 4.0%. No language could be spoken by 1.9% (e.g. too young to talk). New Zealand Sign Language was known by 0.7%. The percentage of people born overseas was 10.1, compared with 28.8% nationally.

Religious affiliations were 31.2% Christian, 0.3% Hindu, 0.3% Islam, 2.9% Māori religious beliefs, 0.2% Buddhist, 0.7% New Age, and 0.9% other religions. People who answered that they had no religion were 54.3%, and 9.5% of people did not answer the census question.

Of those at least 15 years old, 1,407 (9.4%) people had a bachelor's or higher degree, 8,724 (58.5%) had a post-high school certificate or diploma, and 4,401 (29.5%) people exclusively held high school qualifications. The median income was $33,600, compared with $41,500 nationally. 888 people (5.9%) earned over $100,000 compared to 12.1% nationally. The employment status of those at least 15 was that 7,002 (46.9%) people were employed full-time, 2,100 (14.1%) were part-time, and 420 (2.8%) were unemployed.

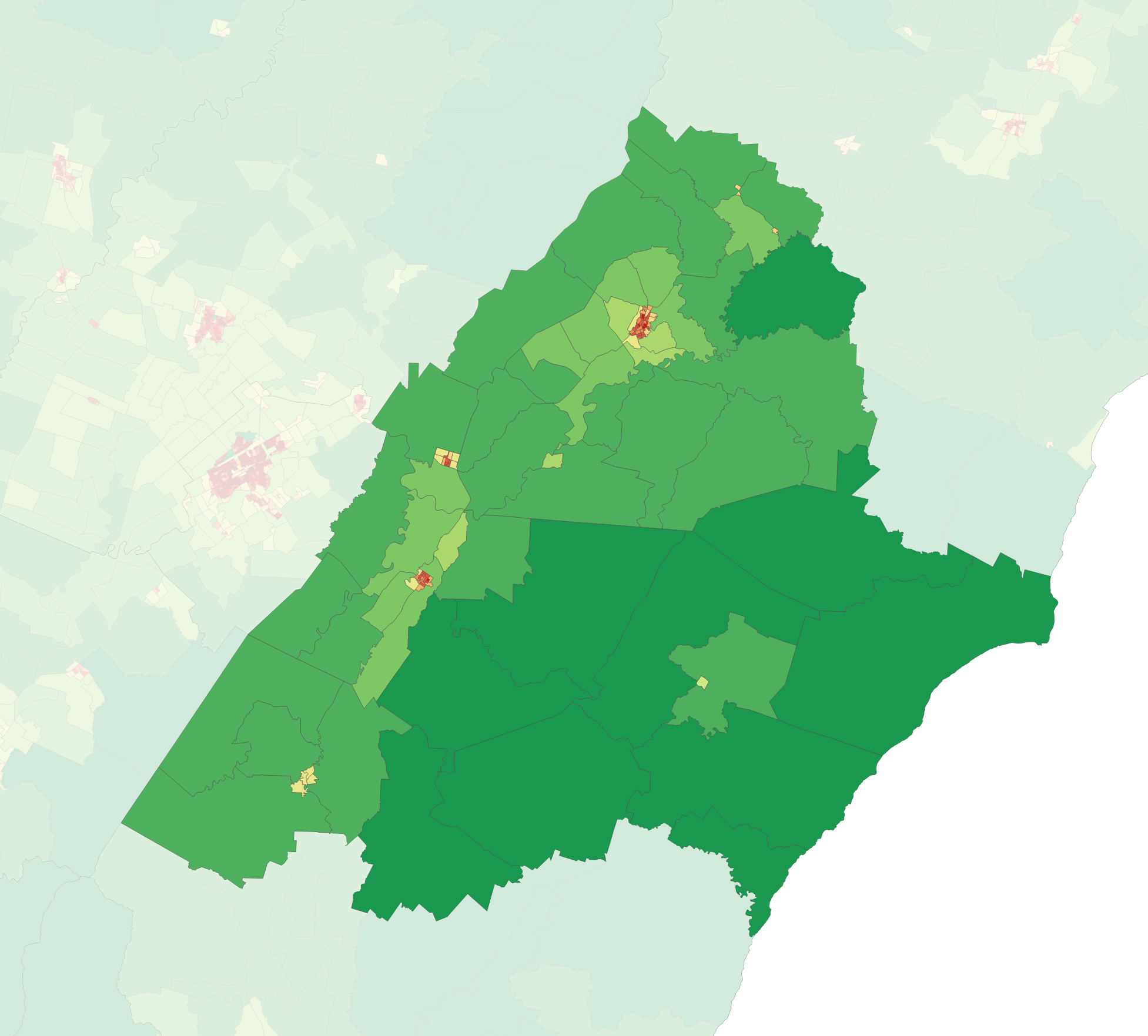
Population density in the 2023 census

Individual wards
Name	Area (km^{2})	Population	Density (per km^{2})	Dwellings	Median age	Median income
North Tararua General Ward	2,384.16	10,035	4.2	3,981	43.1 years	$33,400
South Tararua General Ward	1,980.46	8,625	4.4	3,378	41.7 years	$33,800
New Zealand					38.1 years	$41,500

== "Seventy Mile Bush" ==
When Europeans settled the area, it was almost entirely forested and was called "Seventy Mile Bush". Industrious clearance has made it a busy pastoral district, although the region close to the Pacific coast is still sparsely populated. The original name lives on in that of the local National Provincial Championship rugby union team, Wairarapa-Bush.

== Economy ==
Agriculture is the district's main industry. Other industries include textiles, food processing, and retailing. Commercial forestry is expected to become more important to the district's economy in the next few years.

== Schools ==
Secondary:

- Tararua College, Pahiatua (Year 9-15)
- Dannevirke High School, Dannevirke (Year 9-15)
- Totara College of Accelerated Learning Mangatera, Dannevirke (Year 1-15)
- Te Kura Kaupapa Māori o Tāmaki Nui A Rua, Dannevirke (Years 1-15)

Primary:

- Norsewood and District, Norsewood (Year 1-8)
- Kumeroa School, Kumeroa (Year 1-8)
- Huia Range Dannevirke (Year 1-8)
- Dannevirke South School (Year 1-8)
- St Joseph School Dannevirke (Year 1-8)
- Ruahine School Dannevirke (Year 1-8)
- Woodville School, Woodville
- Eketāhuna School, Eketāhuna (Year 1-8)
- Alfredton School, Alfredton (Year 1-8)
- Ballance School, Ballance (Year 1-8)
- Makuri School (Year 1-8)
- Mangatainoka School (Year 1-8)
- Pahiatua School (Year 1-8)
- Papatawa School (Year 1-8)
- Pongaroa School (Year 1-8)
- St Anthony's School (Pahiatua) (Year 1-8)
- Weber School (Year 1-8)
