= 2025 New Year Honours (New Zealand) =

Awards list for New Zealand

- Previous: 2024 New Zealand bravery awards Next: 2025 King's Birthday Honours
- Type: New Zealand royal honours: New Zealand Order of Merit; King's Service Order; King's Service Medal; New Zealand Antarctic Medal; New Zealand Distinguished Service Decoration
- Date: 31 December 2024
- Country: New Zealand
- Total recipients: 190

The 2025 New Year Honours in New Zealand were appointments by Charles III in his right as King of New Zealand, on the advice of the New Zealand government, to various orders and honours to reward and highlight good works by New Zealanders, and to celebrate the passing of 2024 and the beginning of 2025. They were announced on 31 December 2024.

The recipients of honours are listed here as they were styled before their new honour.

== New Zealand Order of Merit ==
=== Dame Companion (DNZM) ===
- Julie Clare Chapman – of Albany. For services to children and the community.
- Nea Ingrid Collins MNZM – of Gisborne. For services to Māori, business and health governance.
- Bogyung Ko (Lydia Ko) MNZM – of Florida, United States. For services to golf.
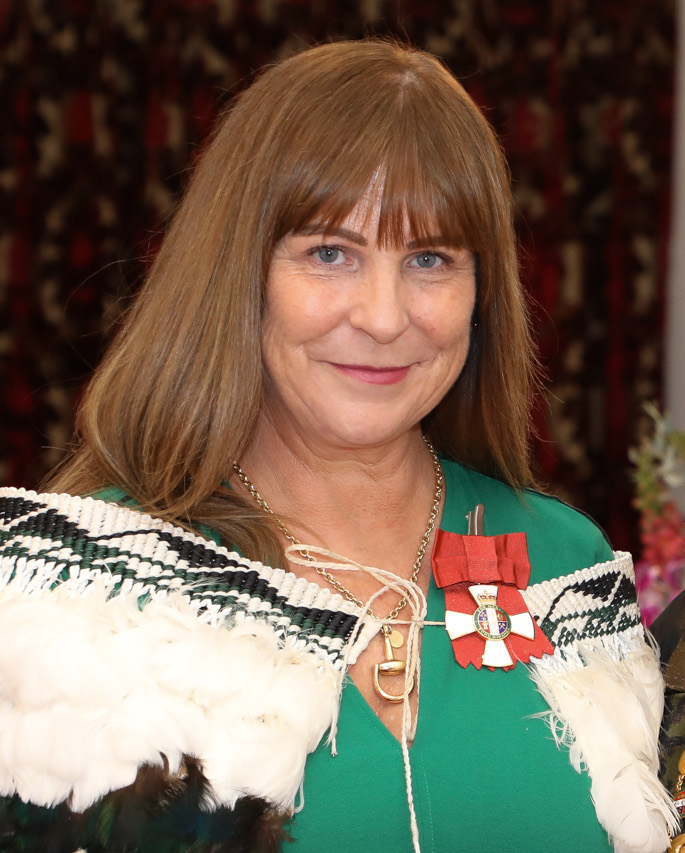
Dame Julie Chapman

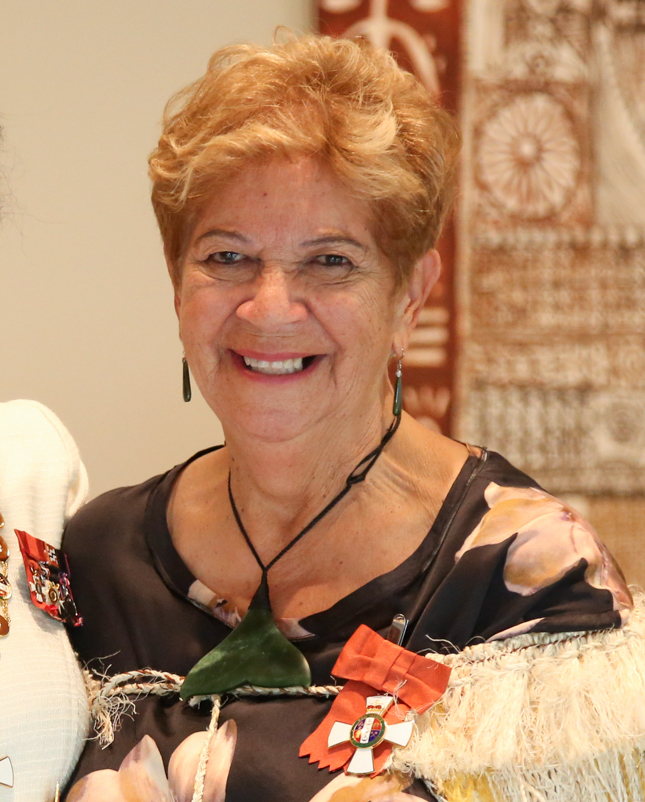
Dame Ingrid Collins

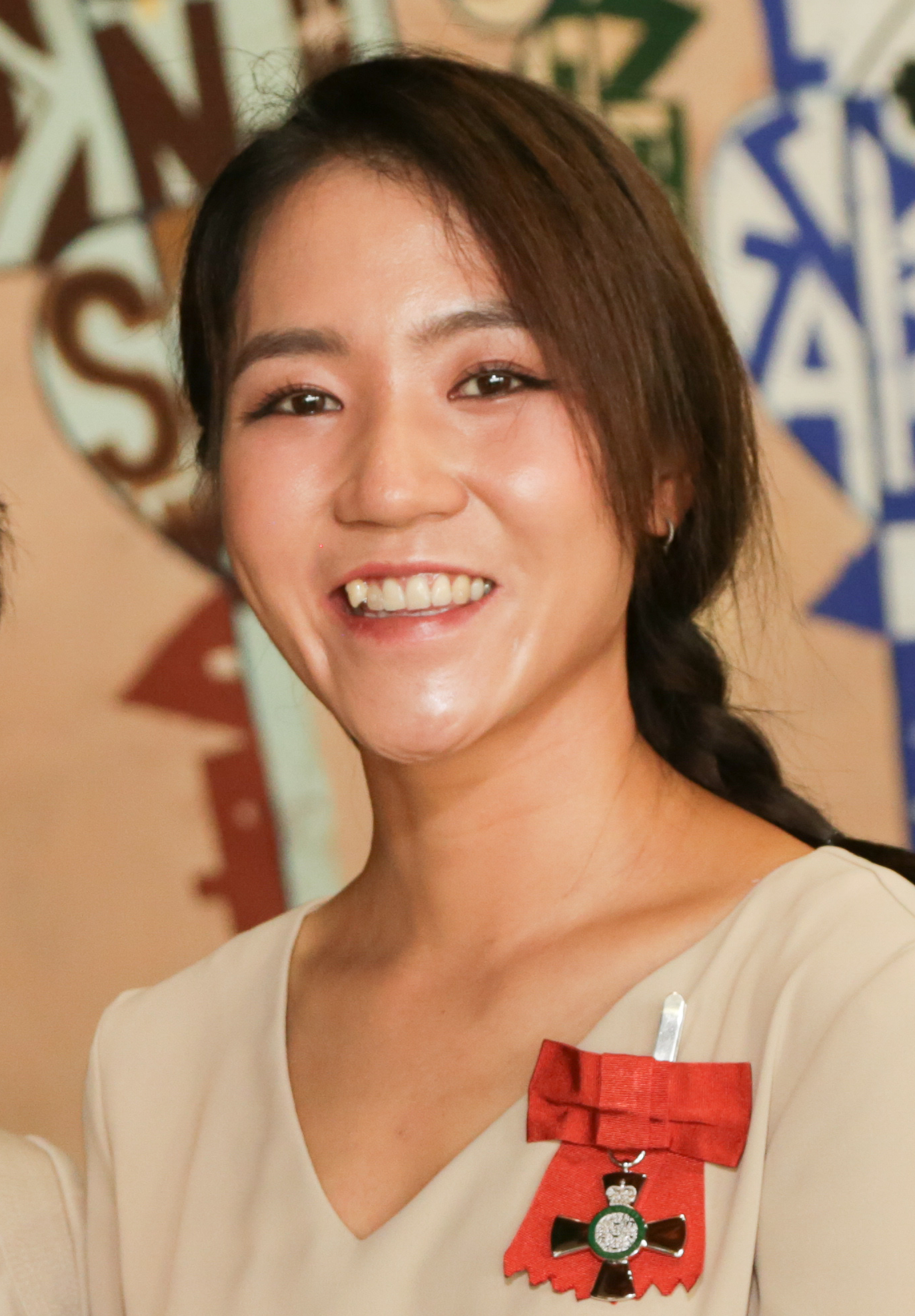
Dame Lydia Ko

=== Knight Companion (KNZM) ===
- John Allan Gallagher CNZM KStJ – of Frankton. For services to business, education, philanthropy and the community.
- Edward Colin Manson CNZM – of St Heliers. For services to philanthropy, the community and business.
- Honorary Professor Peter Robert Skelton CNZM – of Fendalton. For services to environmental law.
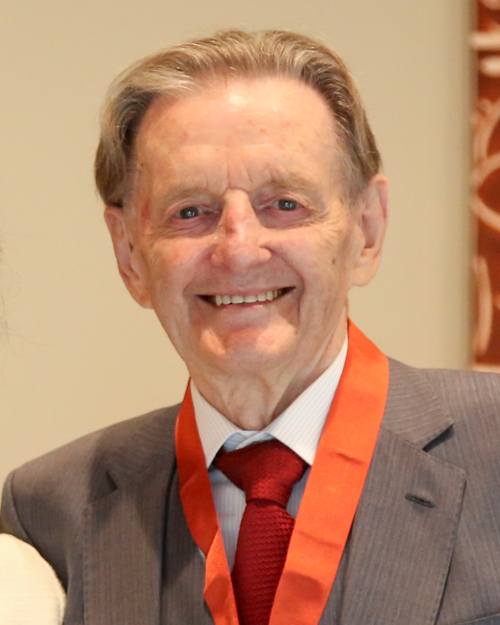
Sir John Gallagher

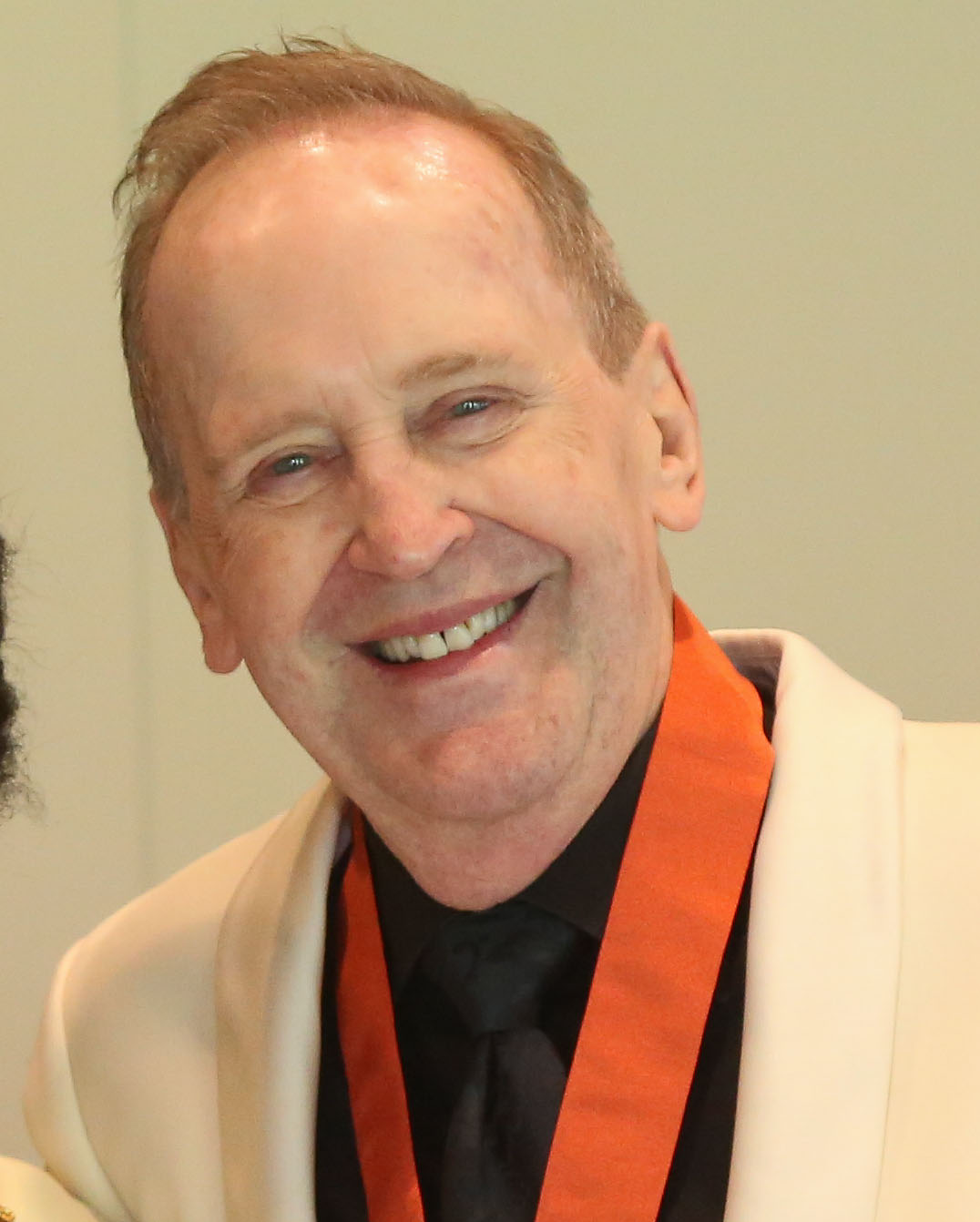
Sir Ted Manson

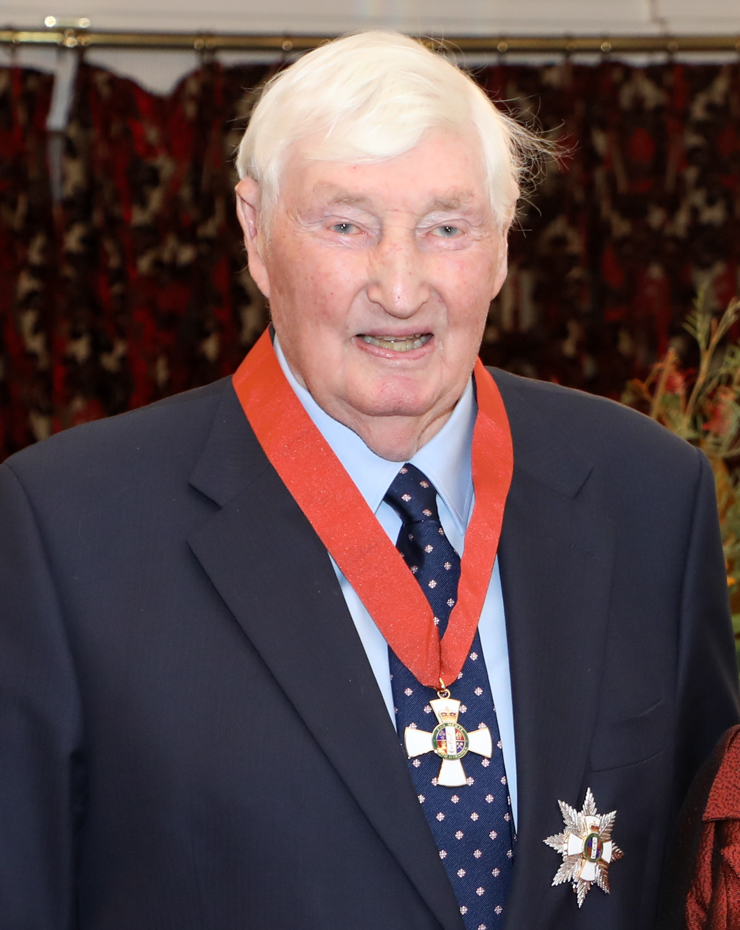
Sir Peter Skelton

=== Companion (CNZM) ===
- Graeme Hilton Blick – of Whitby. For services to geodesy.
- Ian Douglas Foster – of Newstead. For services to rugby.
- Esther Frances Fung ONZM – of Karori. For services to the Chinese community.
- Frederick John Graham ONZM – of Waiuku. For services to Māori art.
- John Bernard Hart ONZM – of Remuera. For services to sports governance.
- Emeritus Professor Jillian Jeanette Hooks – of Murrays Bay. For services to accountancy and education.
- Kai-Shek Luey QSM – of Remuera. For services to the Chinese community.
- Professor Helen Linda Pilmore – of Epsom. For services to nephrology and transplantation services.
- Suzanne Lena Prentice OBE – of Windsor. For services to music and the community.
- Robin Scholes OBE – of Herne Bay. For services to the screen industry.
- Dr Harjinder Singh – of Palmerston North. For services to food science.
- Alan Richard Baillie Smythe – of Mount Eden. For services to the community and philanthropy.
- Emeritus Professor William Murray Thomson – of Maori Hill. For services to oral health.
- Kennie Tsui – of Brooklyn. For services to the environment and governance.
- Dr Keith Sharman Turner – of Tauranga. For services to the electricity industry.

Honorary

- Laurie Ann Hilsgen – of Grey Lynn. For services to family carers.
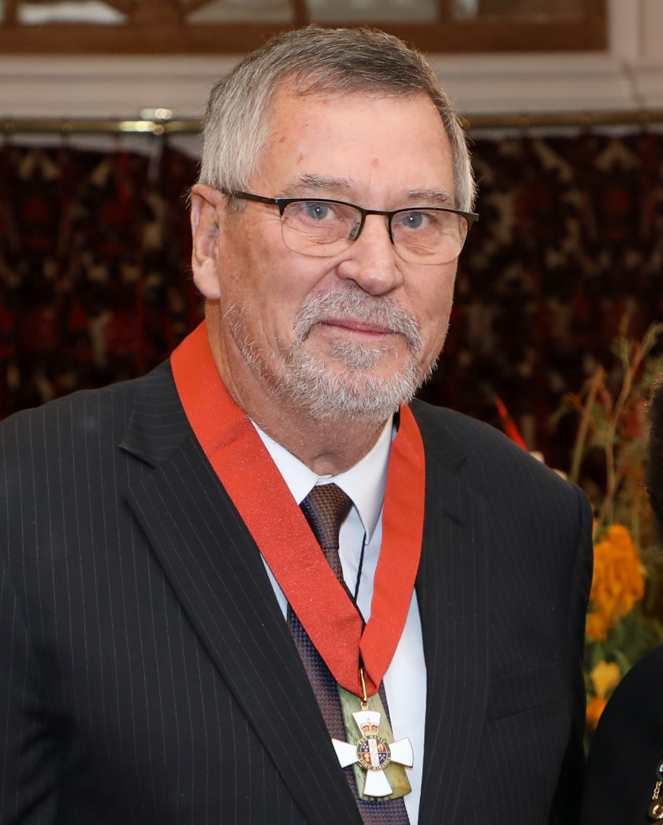
Graeme Blick

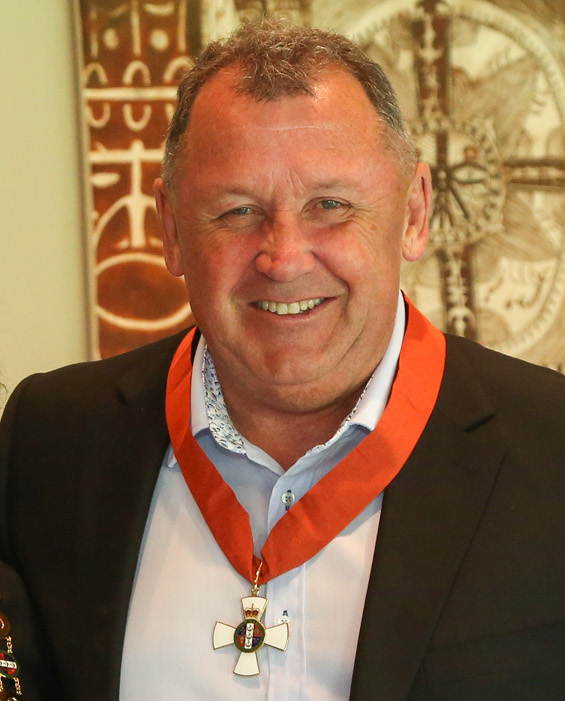
Ian Foster

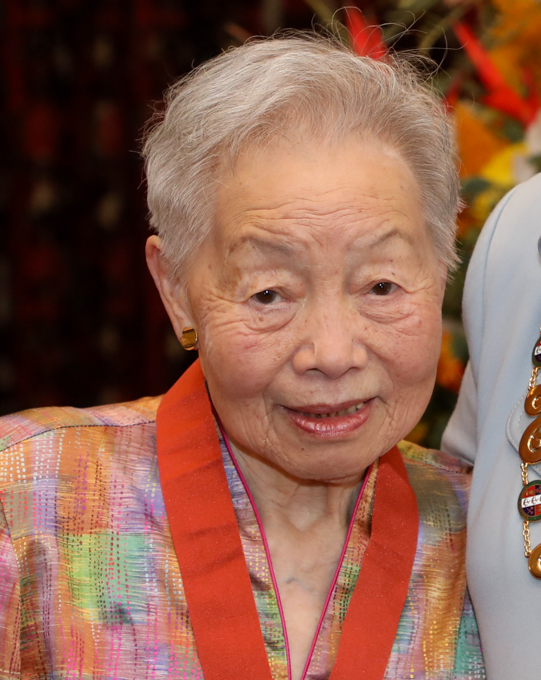
Esther Fung

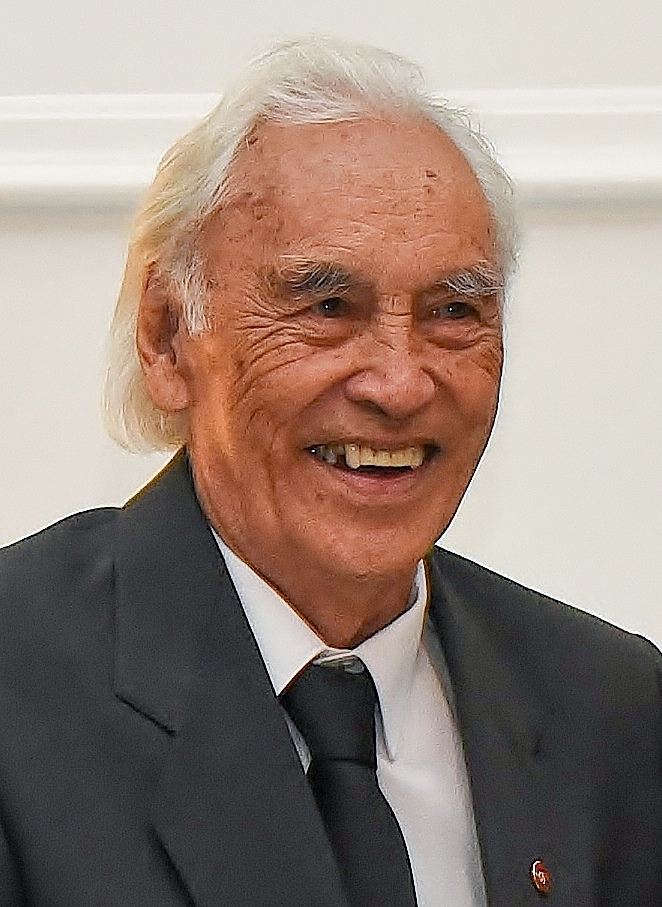
Fred Graham

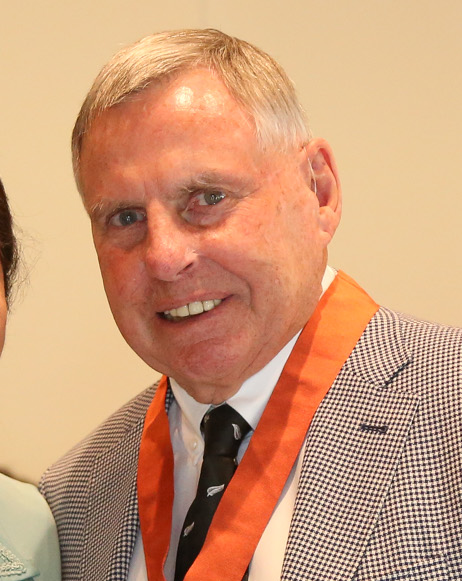
John Hart

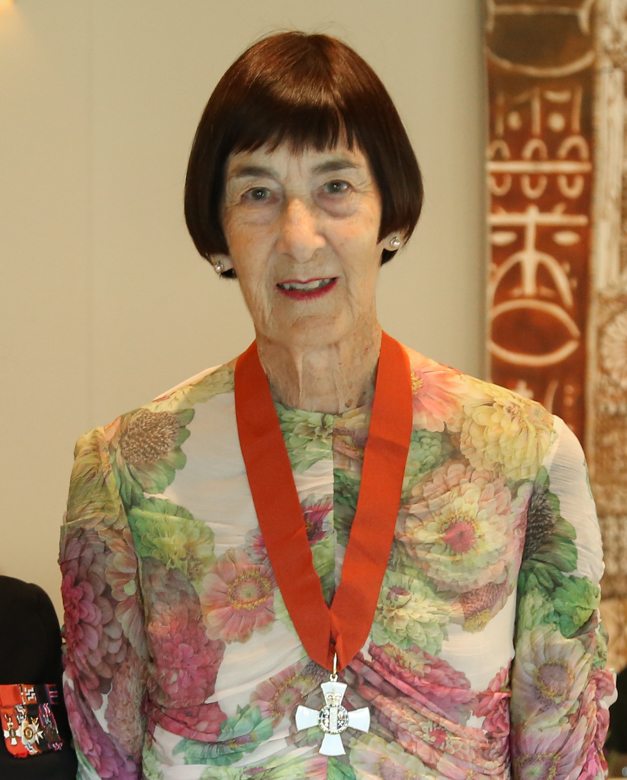
Jill Hooks

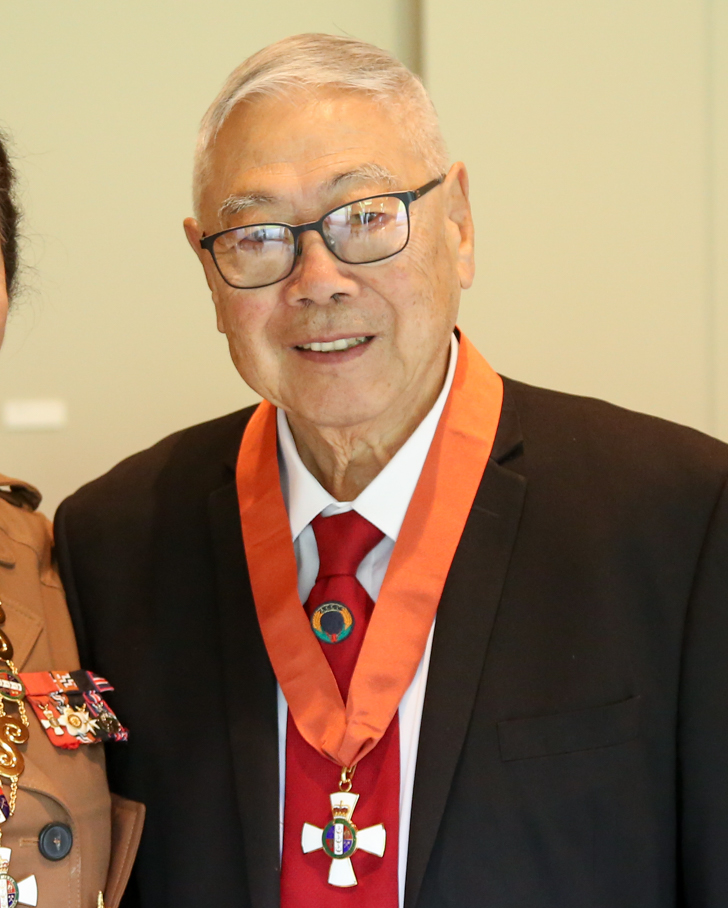
Kai Luey

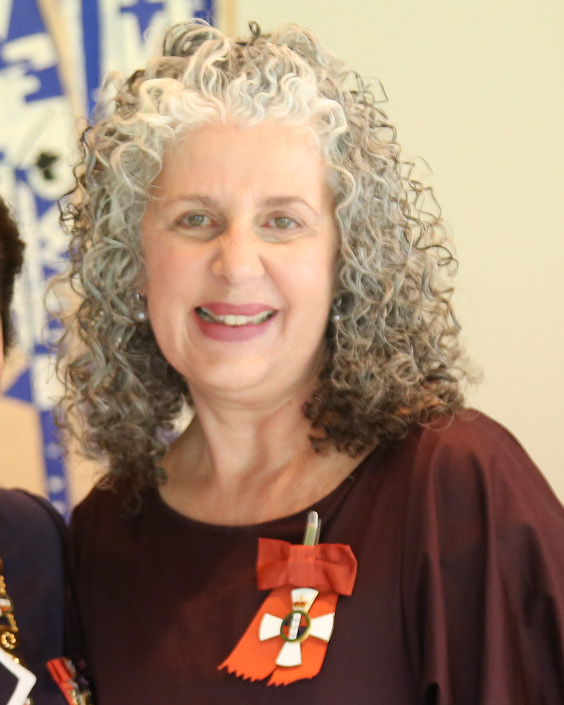
Helen Pilmore

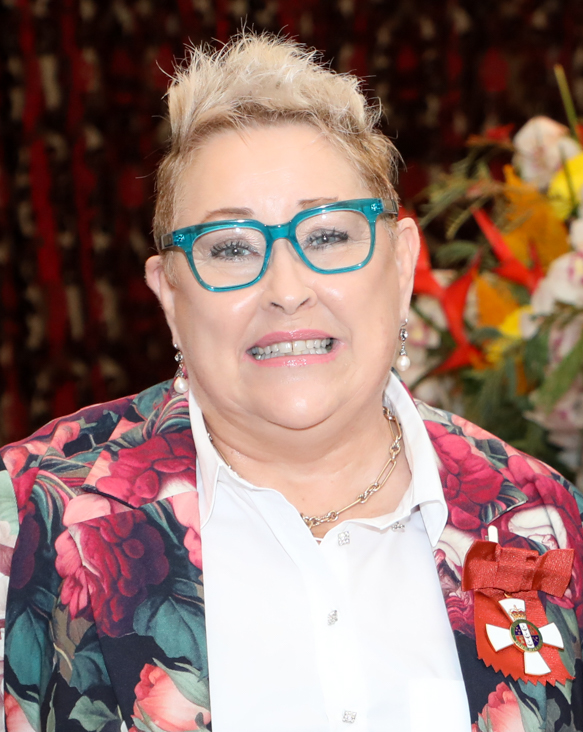
Suzanne Prentice

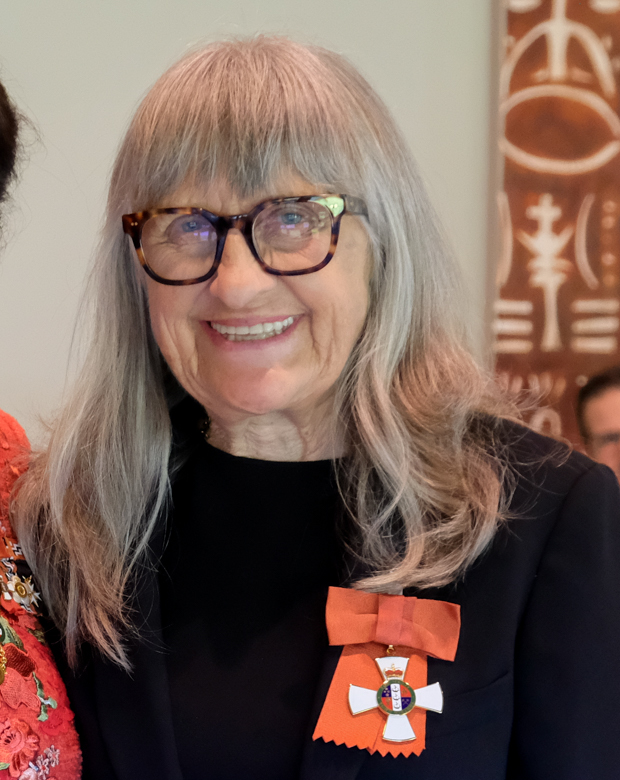
Robin Scholes

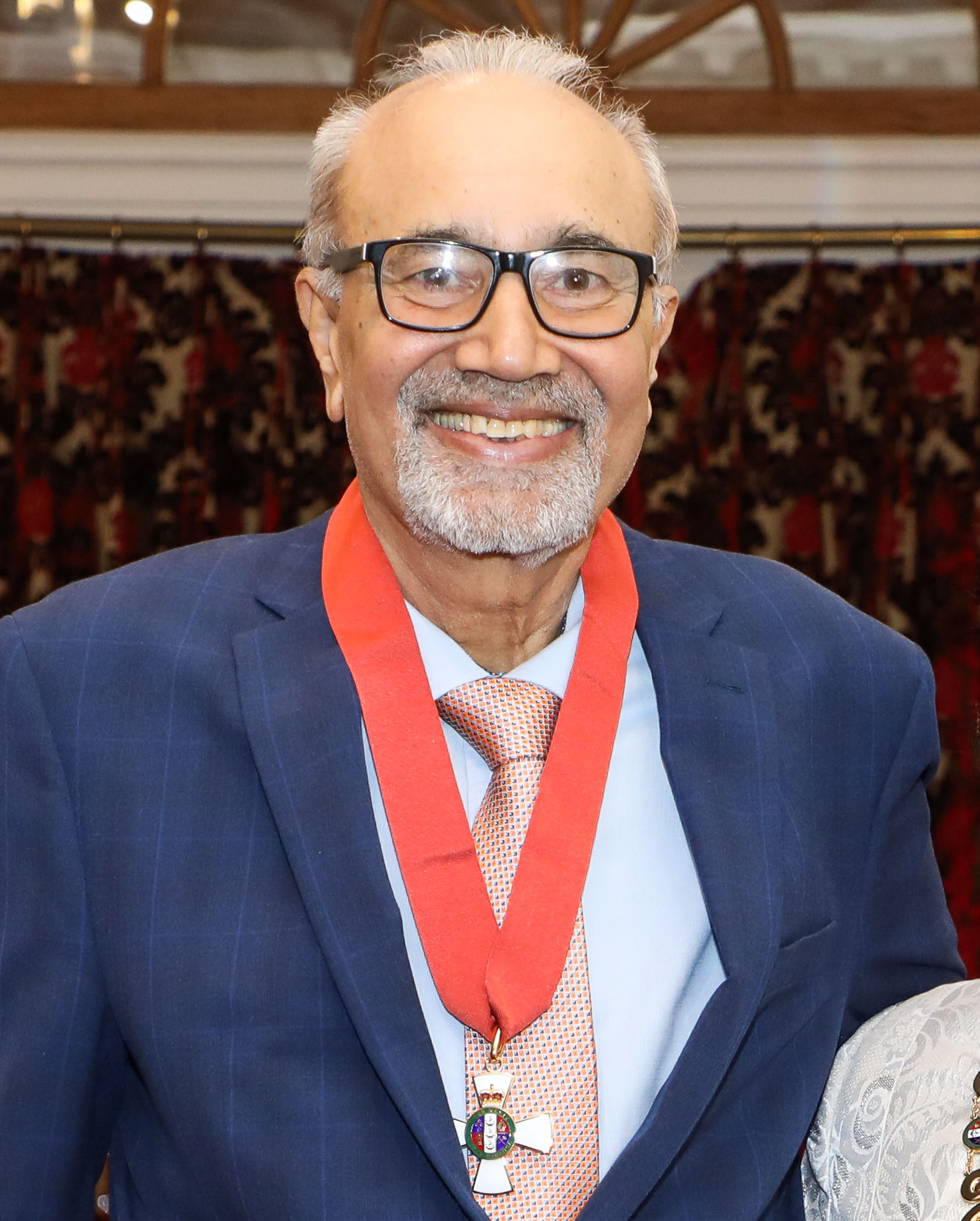
Harjinder Singh

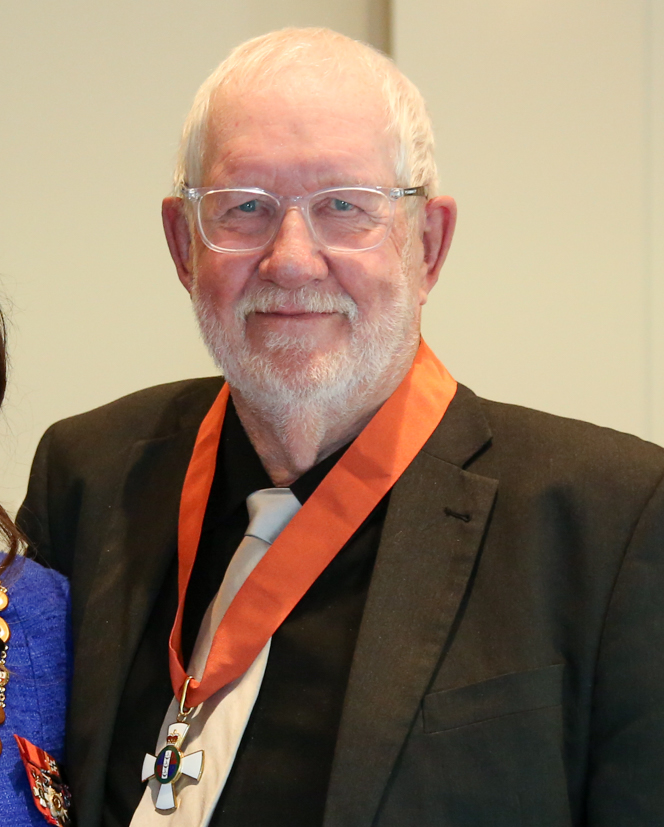
Alan Smythe

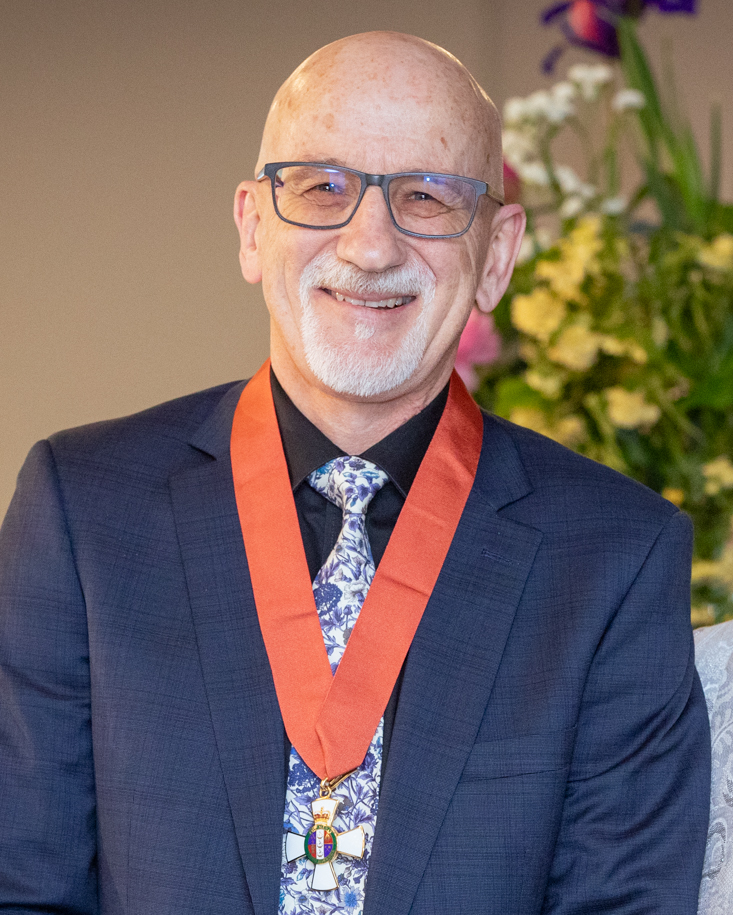
Murray Thomson

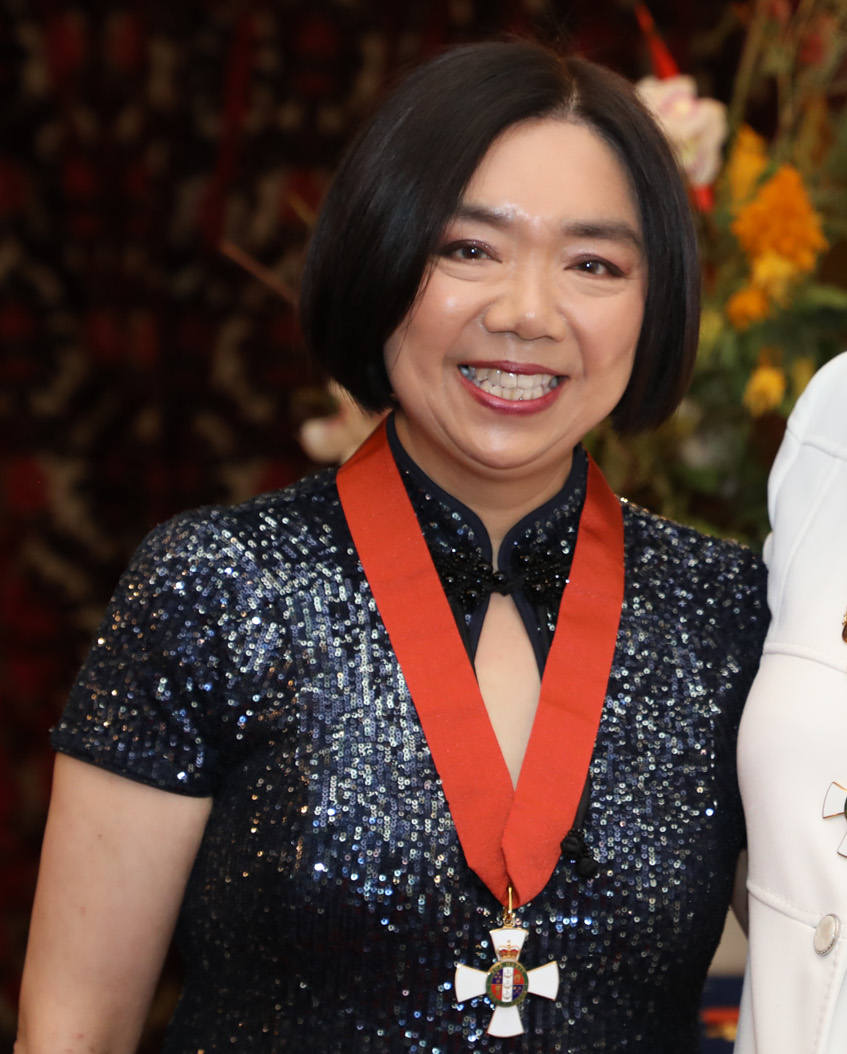
Kennie Tsui

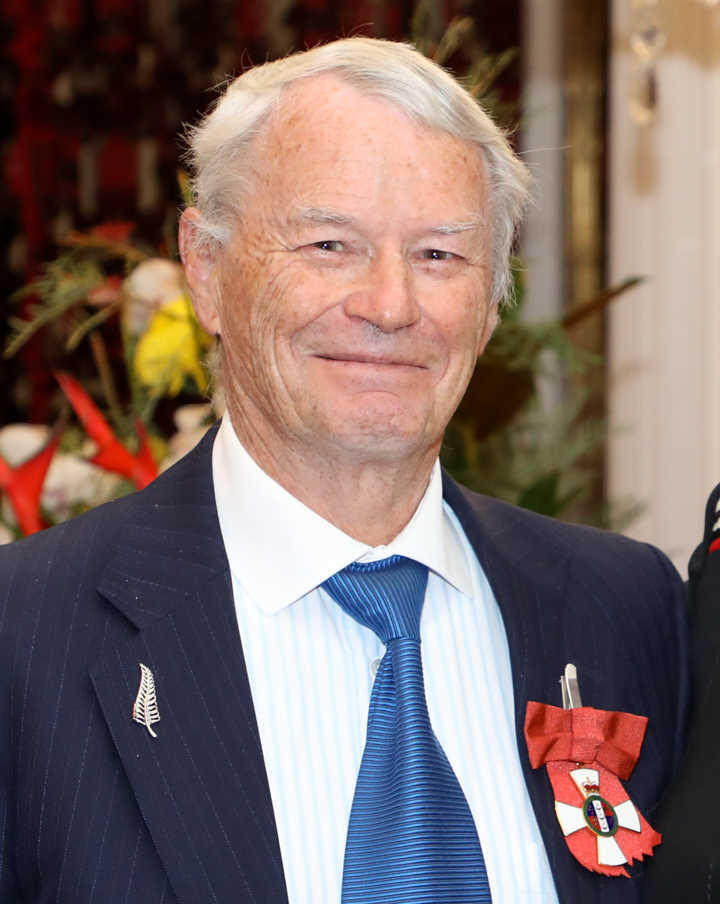
Keith Turner

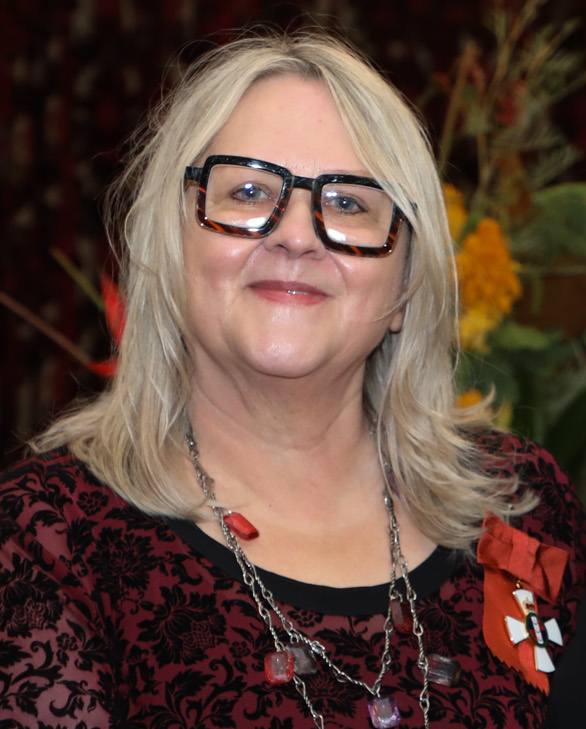
Laurie Hilsgen

=== Officer (ONZM) ===
- Denise Katherine Astill – of Bucklands Beach. For services to the prevention of foetal anticonvulsant syndromes.
- Carlos Edward James Bagrie – of Queenstown. For services to the food and rural industries.
- Major General (Rtd) John Raymond Boswell DSD – of Wellington. For services to the New Zealand Defence Force.
- Robert James William Campbell – of Waikiwi. For services to farming and governance.
- Marguerite Diane Christophers – of Pegasus. For services to Para sports.
- Dr Peter John Cleave – of Kelvin Grove. For services to Māori language education.
- Professor Trisia Angela Farrelly – of Roslyn. For services to ecology.
- Dr Catherine Mary Ferguson – of Kelburn. For services to otolaryngology.
- Heke-Turoa Ropine Huata – of Havelock North. For services to Māori and education.
- Albert Puhirake Ihaka – of Tauranga. For services to Māori and governance.
- Sudesh Kumar Jhunjhnuwala – of Kohimarama. For services to the hospitality industry and philanthropy.
- Prudence Elizabeth Lamerton – of Havelock North. For services to nuclear medicine.
- Nadia Rui-Chi Lim – of Queenstown. For services to the food industry.
- Professor Cyril Wayne McIlwraith – of Kaiteriteri. For services to veterinary medicine and the equine industry.
- Matthew Christian Metcalfe – of Remuera. For services to the film industry.
- Lee Wei-Hahn Murray – of Welcome Bay. For services to literature, particularly speculative literature.
- Oliver Michael Newland – of Remuera. For services to real estate and the community.
- Christine Rewa Panapa MNZM – of Point Chevalier. For services to Māori.
- Dr Te Taku Parai – of Takapūwāhia. For services to Māori, governance and the community.
- Rear Admiral (Rtd) David Colin Proctor – of Kingston, ACT, Australia. For services to the New Zealand Defence Force.
- Dr Te Tuhi Robust – of Kawakawa. For services to Māori and education.
- Anthony John Shaw – of Wānaka. For services to people with intellectual disabilities and the community.
- Dr Margot Alison Skinner – of Dunedin Central. For services to physiotherapy.
- Mervyn John Solly – of Rockville. For services to the transport industry and business.
- Debra Mary Delores Sorensen – of Ōtāhuhu. For services to Pacific health.
- Kate Elizabeth Sylvester – of Westmere. For services to the fashion industry.
- Iain Clark Taylor – of Eden Terrace. For services to education.
- Emeritus Professor Murray William Tilyard – of Mosgiel. For services to health.
- Samuel Laurence Whitelock – of Napier. For services to rugby and the community.
- Dr Bryce Derek Wilkinson – of Thorndon. For services to economics.

Honorary

- Clara Elisabeth Hutchinson-de Ranitz – of Huntington. For services to midwifery.
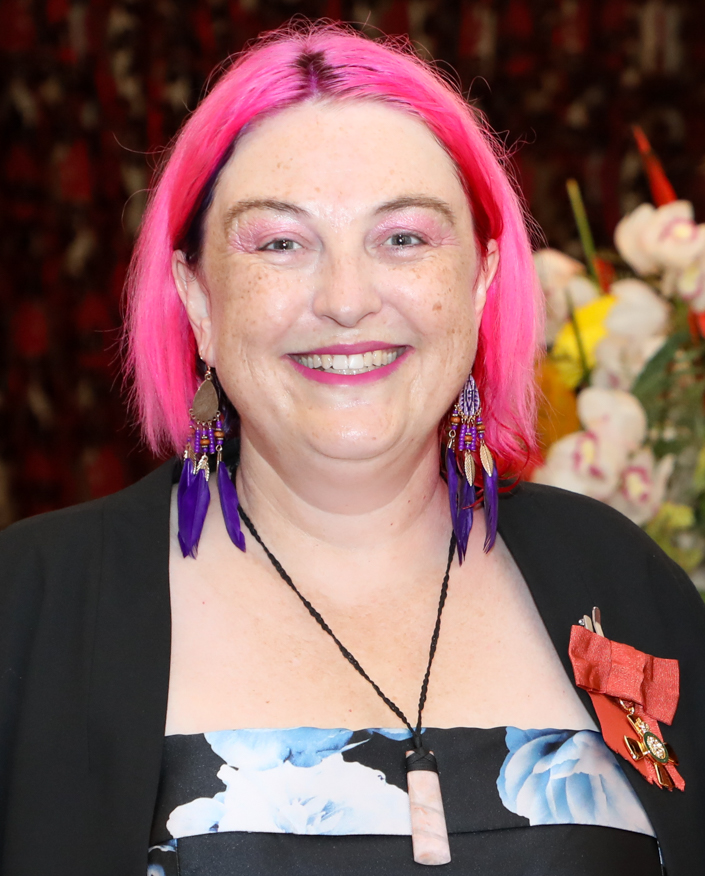
Denise Astill

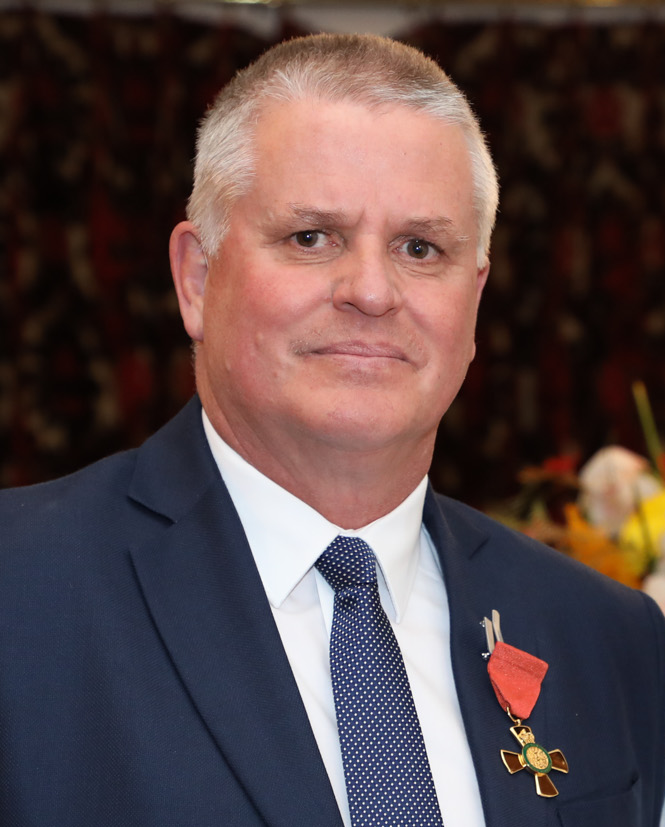
John Boswell

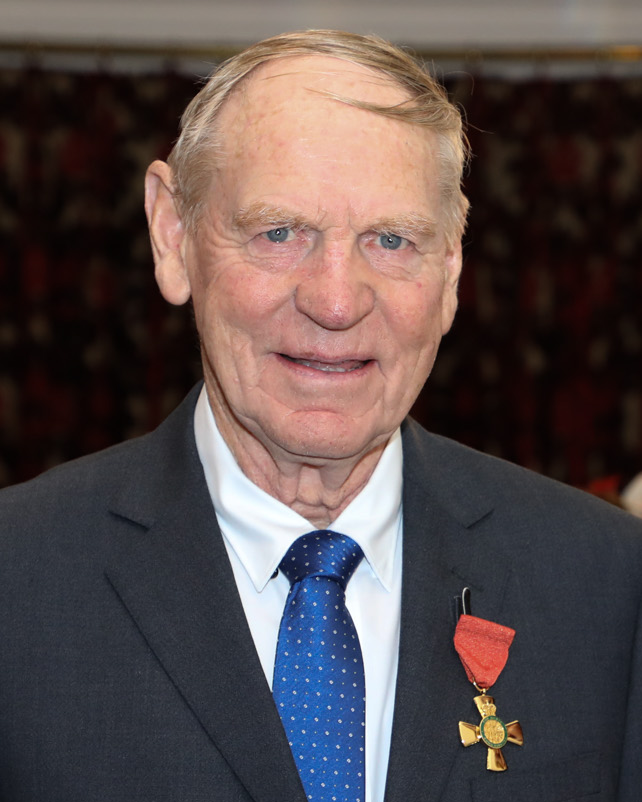
Robin Campbell

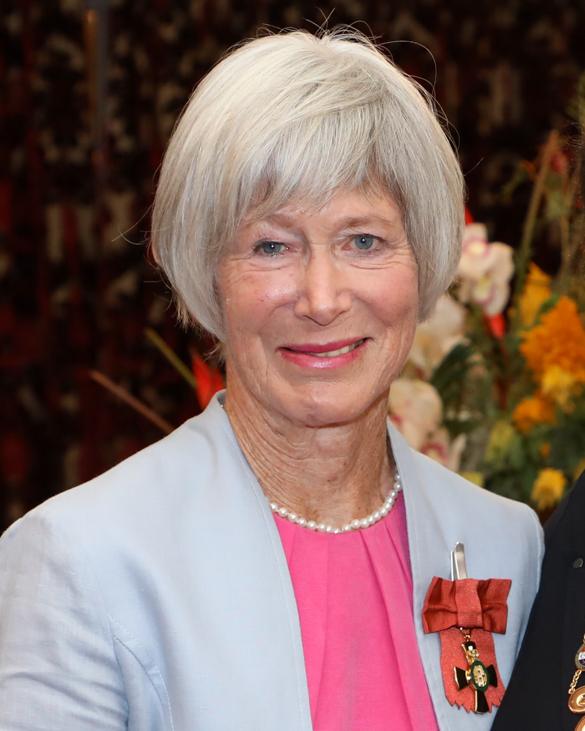
Marguerite Christophers

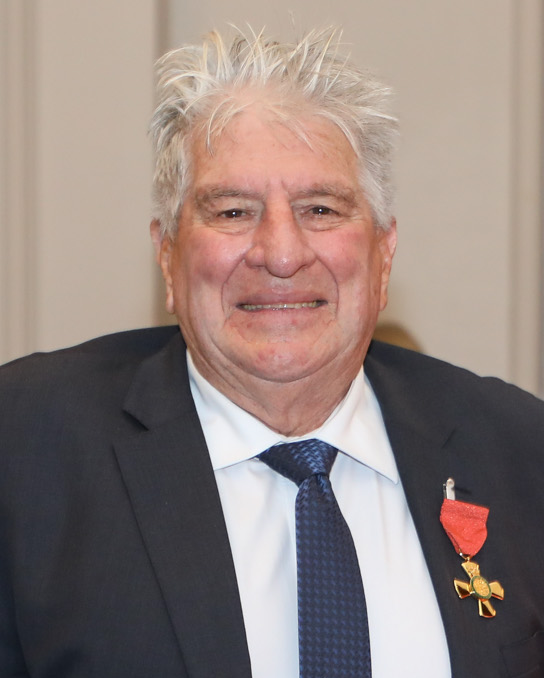
Peter Cleave

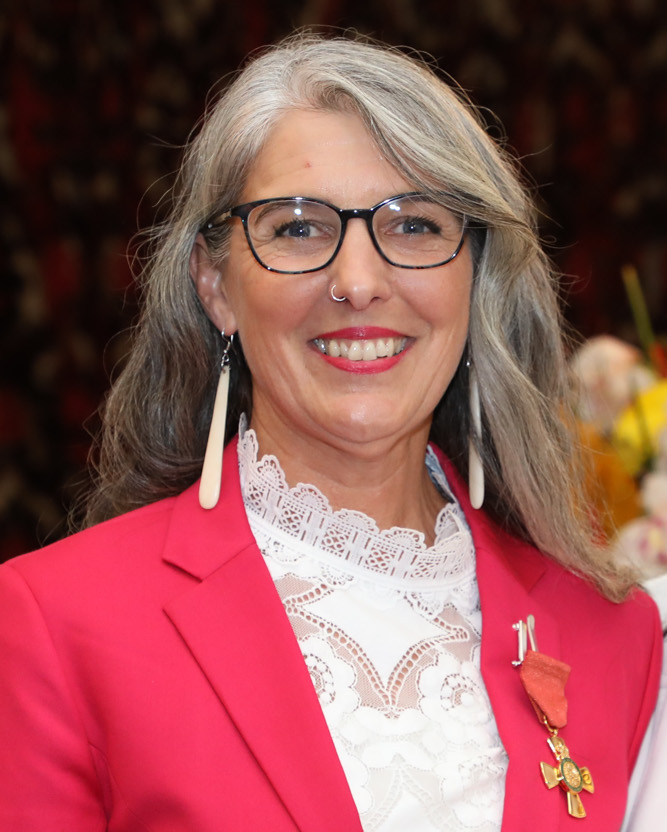
Trisia Farrelly

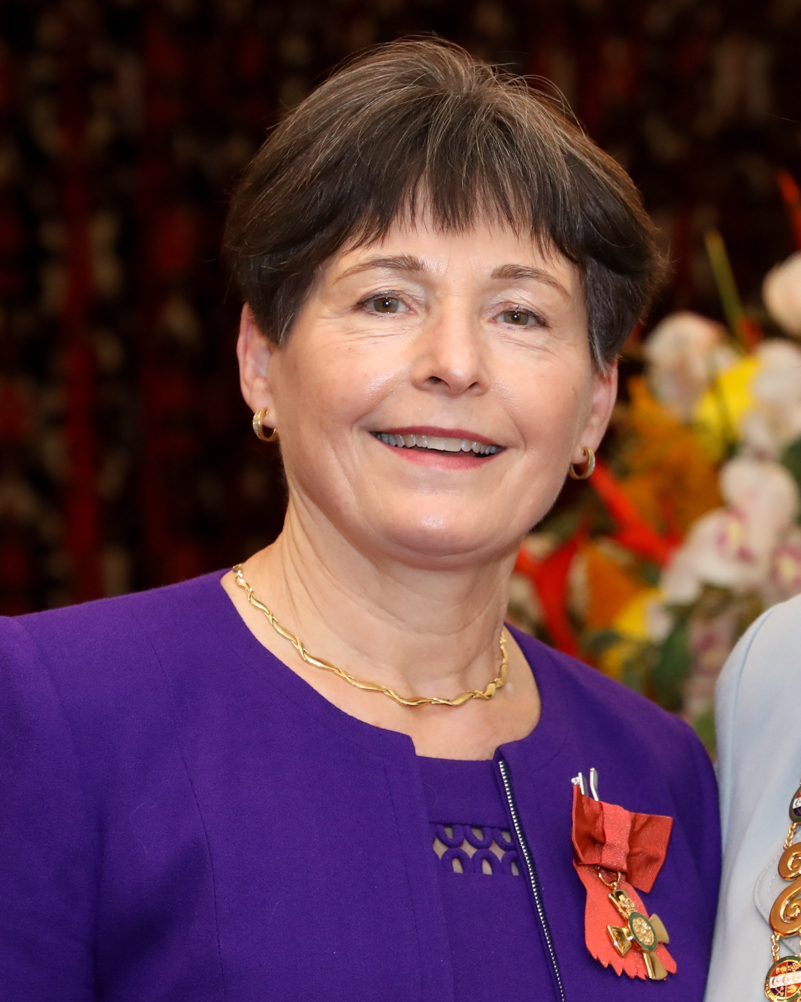
Catherine Ferguson

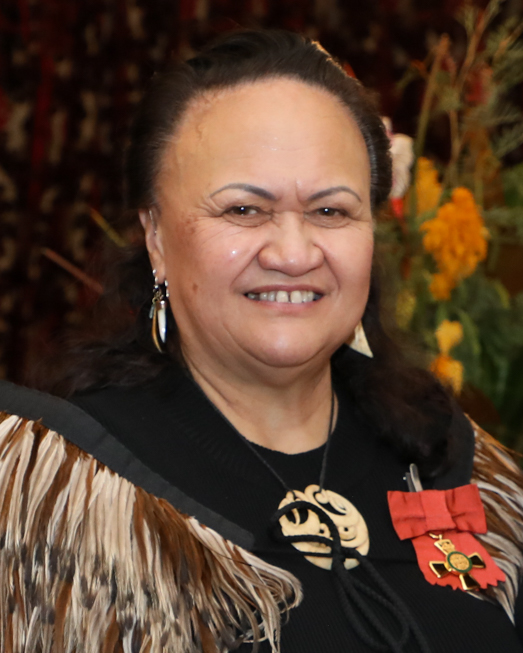
Heke-Turoa Huata

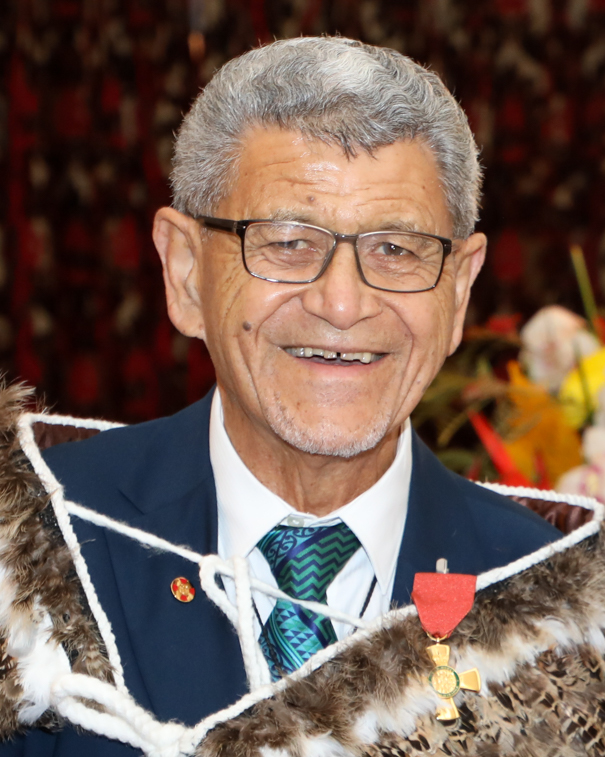
Puhirake Ihaka

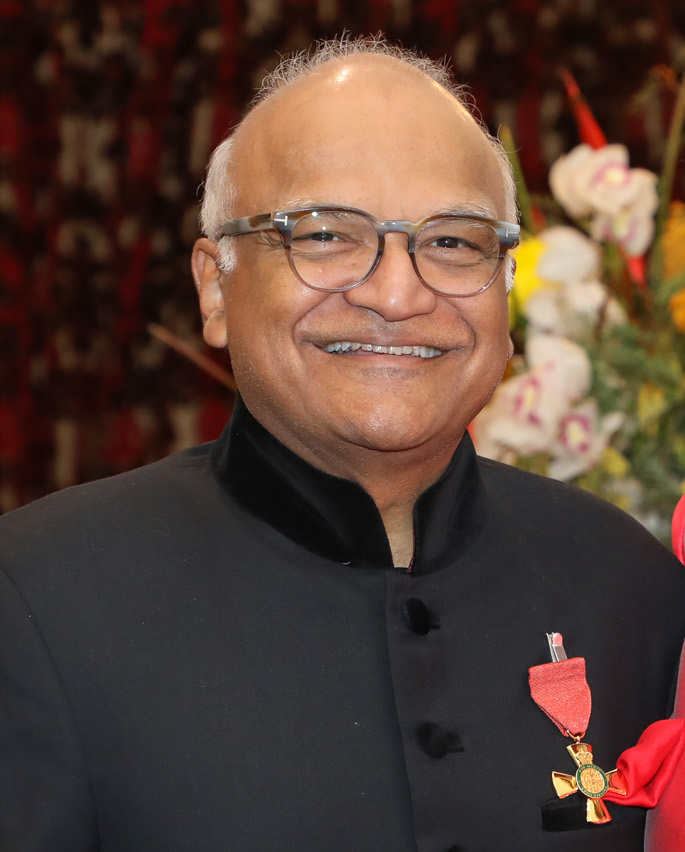
Sudesh Jhunjhnuwala

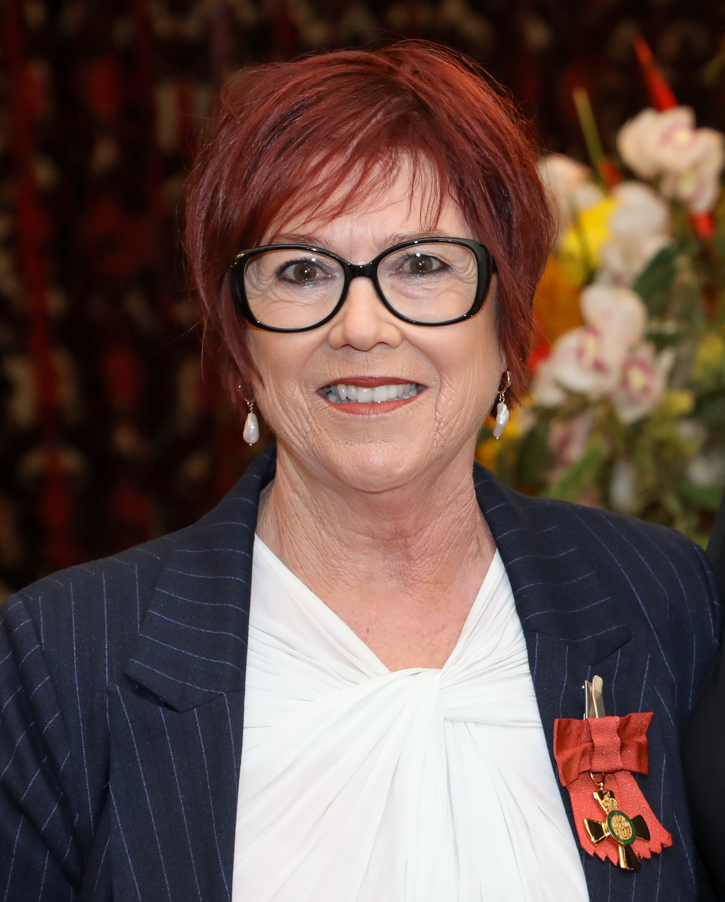
Prue Lamerton

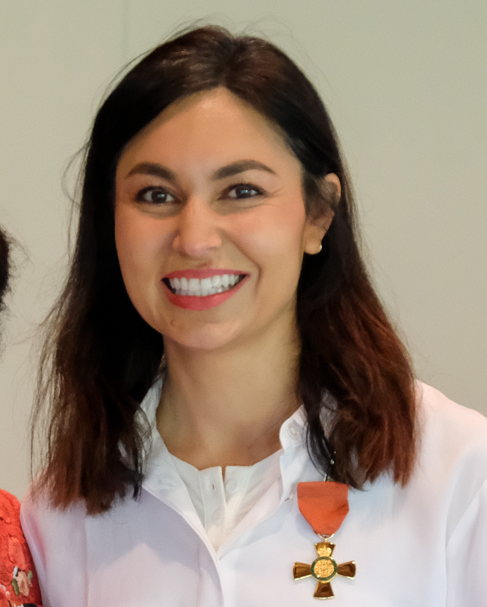
Nadia Lim

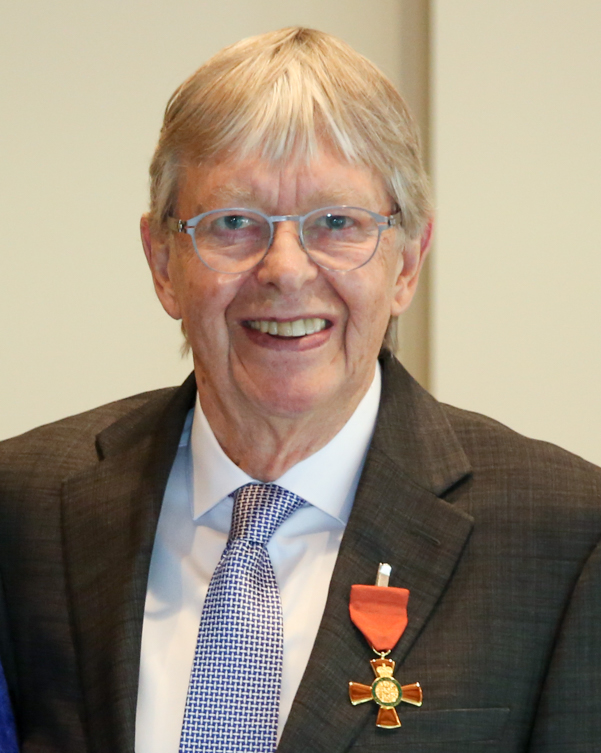
Wayne McIlwraith

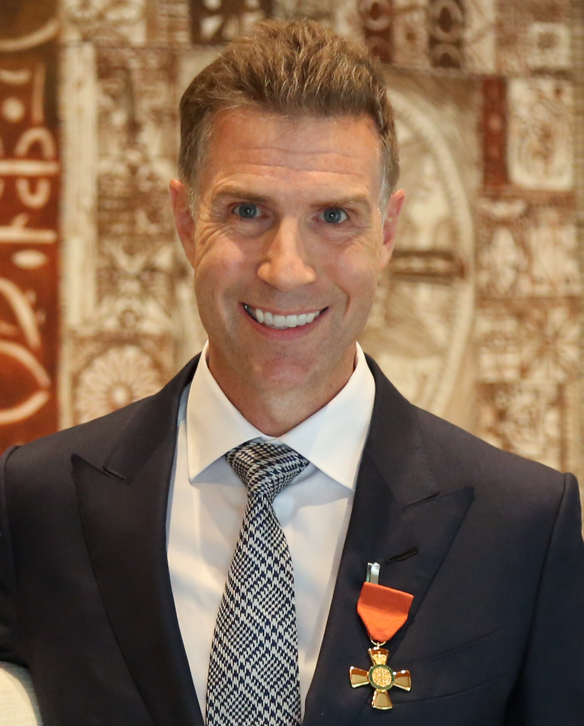
Matthew Metcalfe

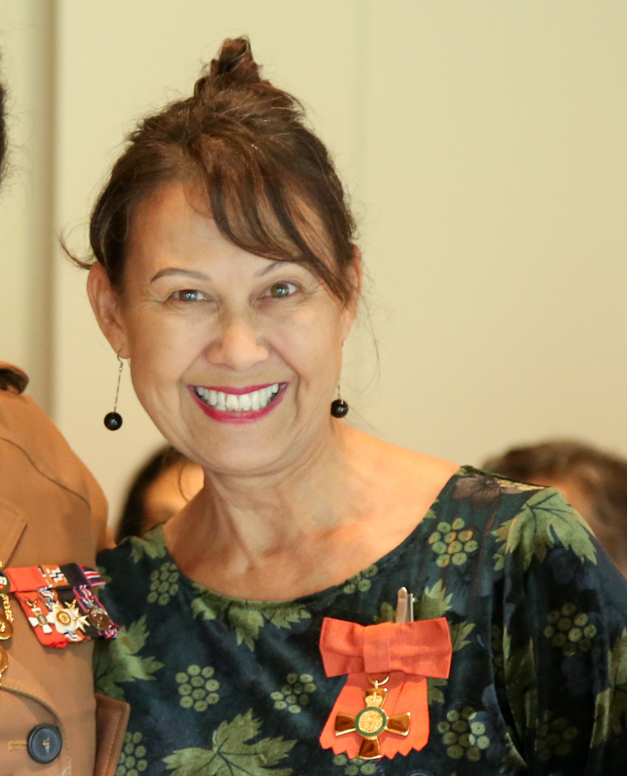
Lee Murray

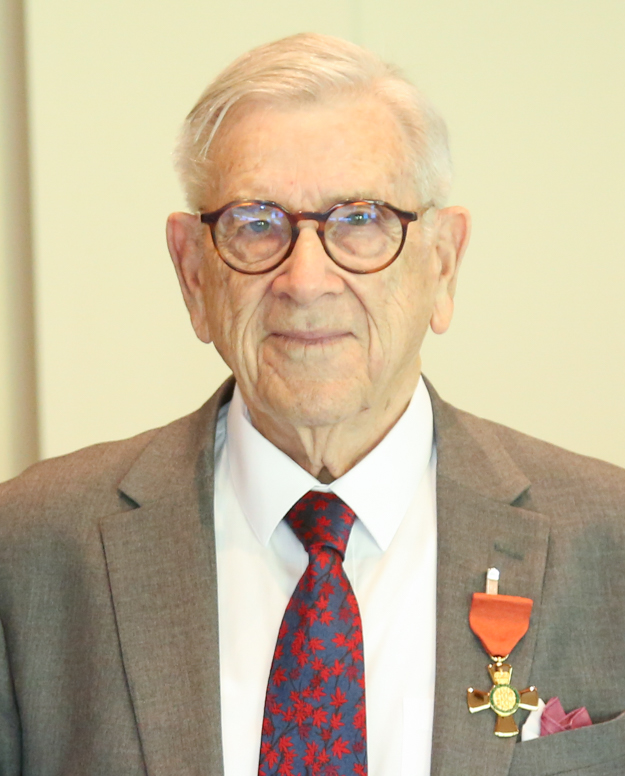
Olly Newland

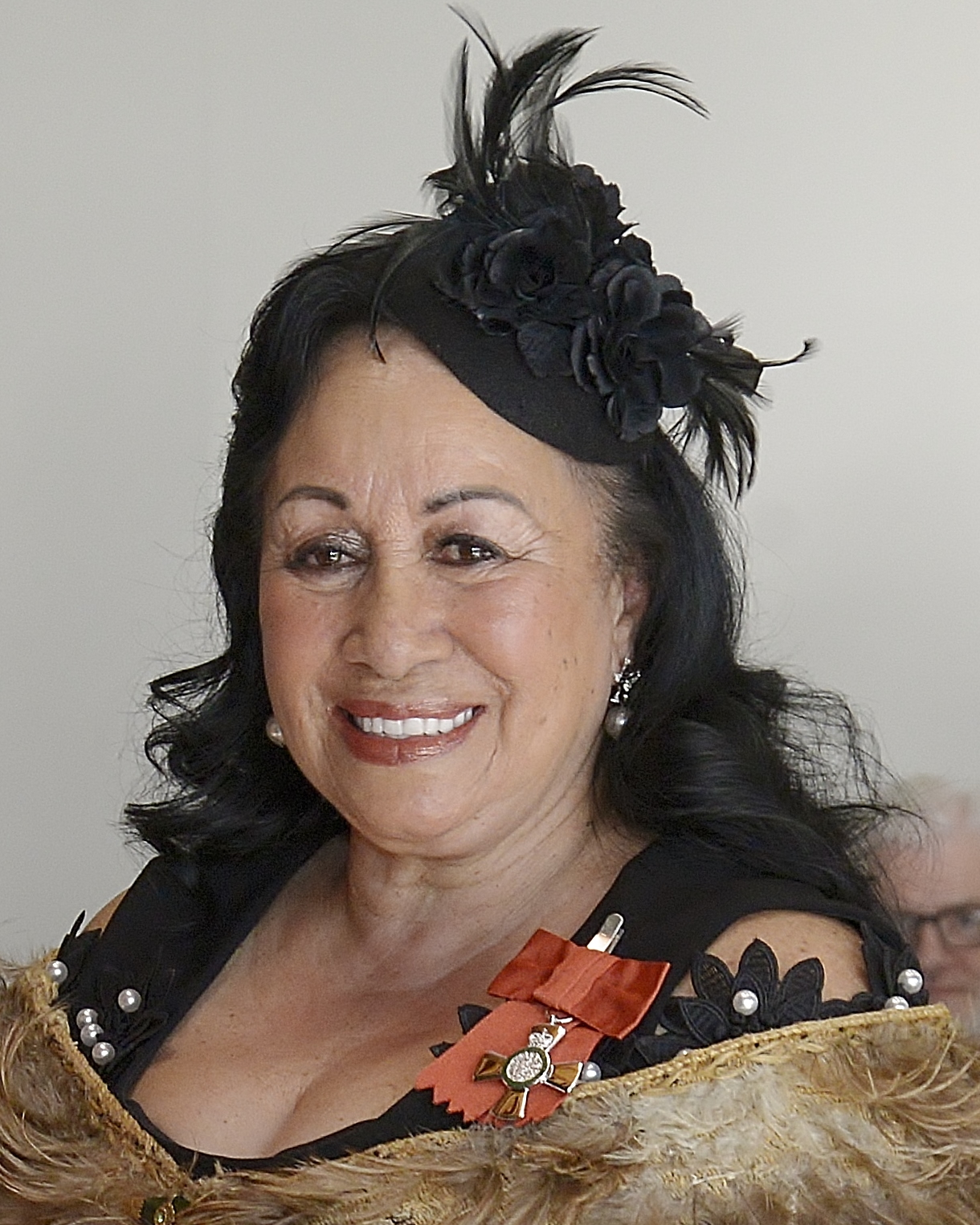
Christine Panapa

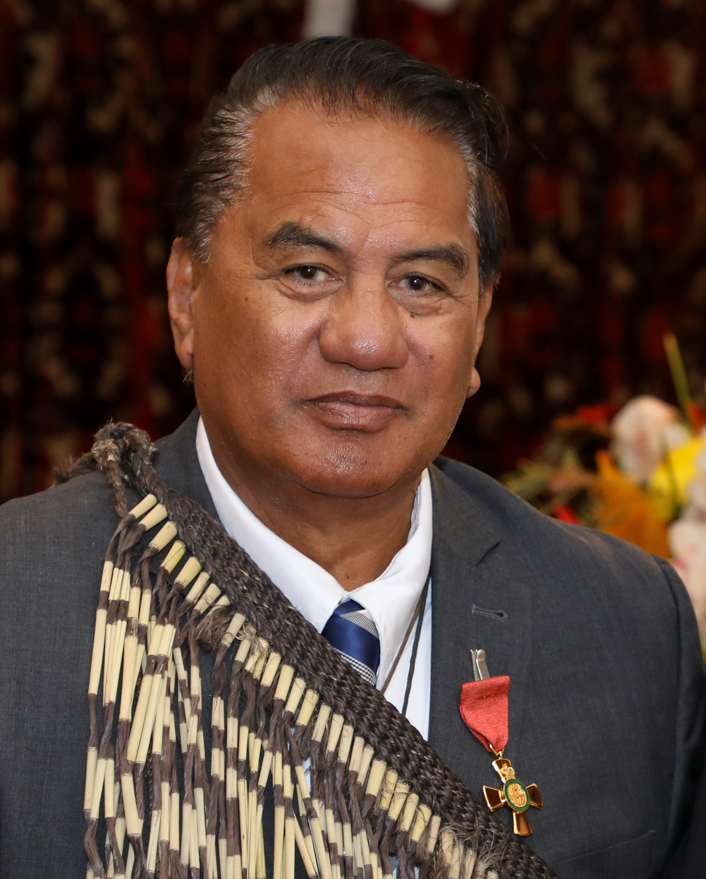
Taku Parai

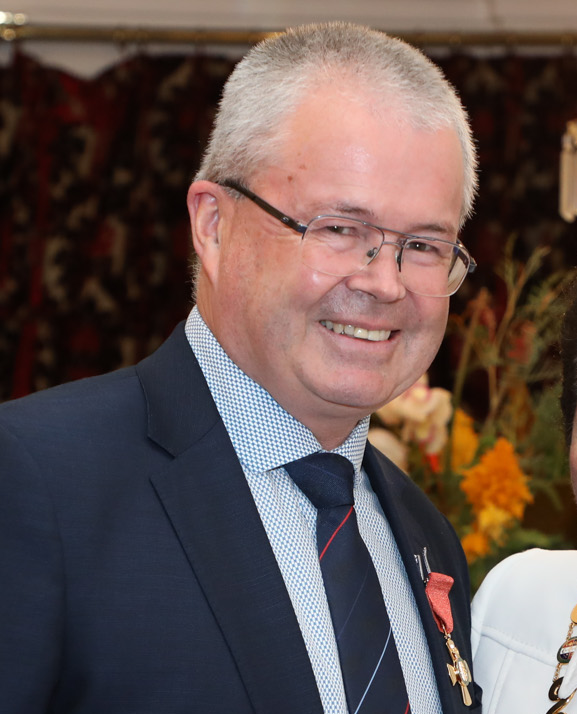
David Proctor

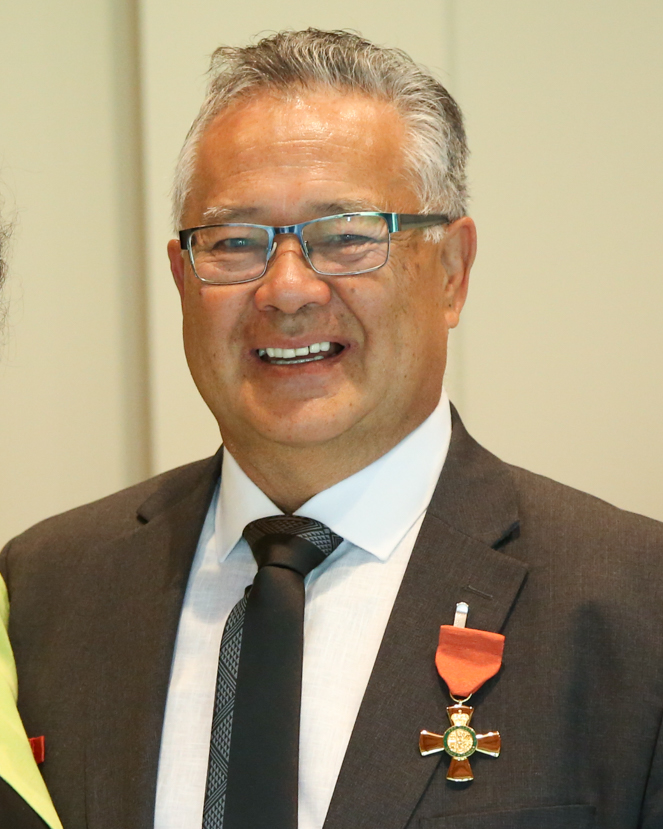
Te Tuhi Robust

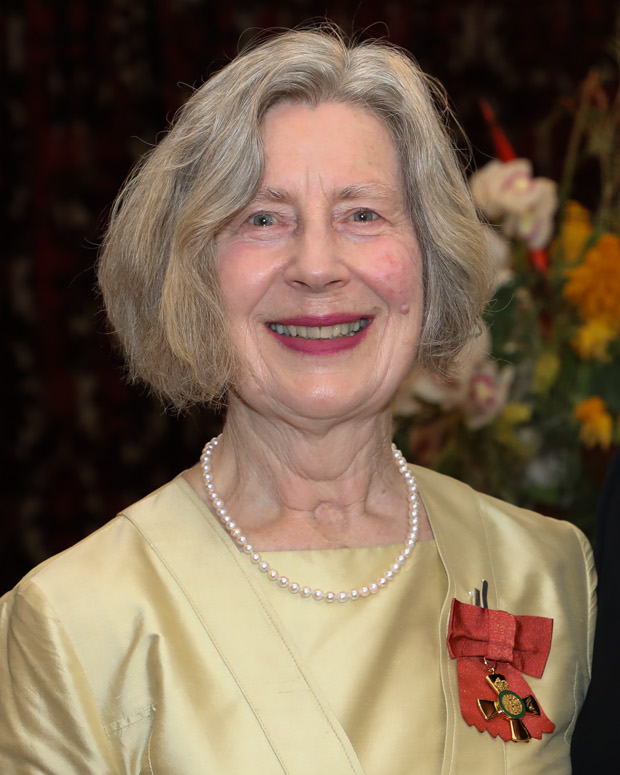
Margot Skinner

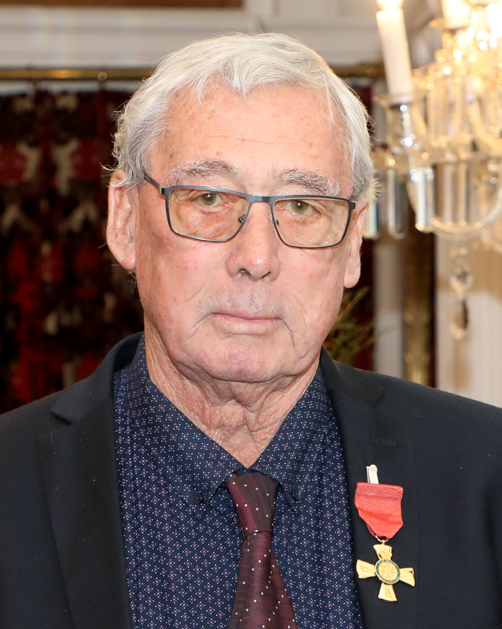
Merv Solly

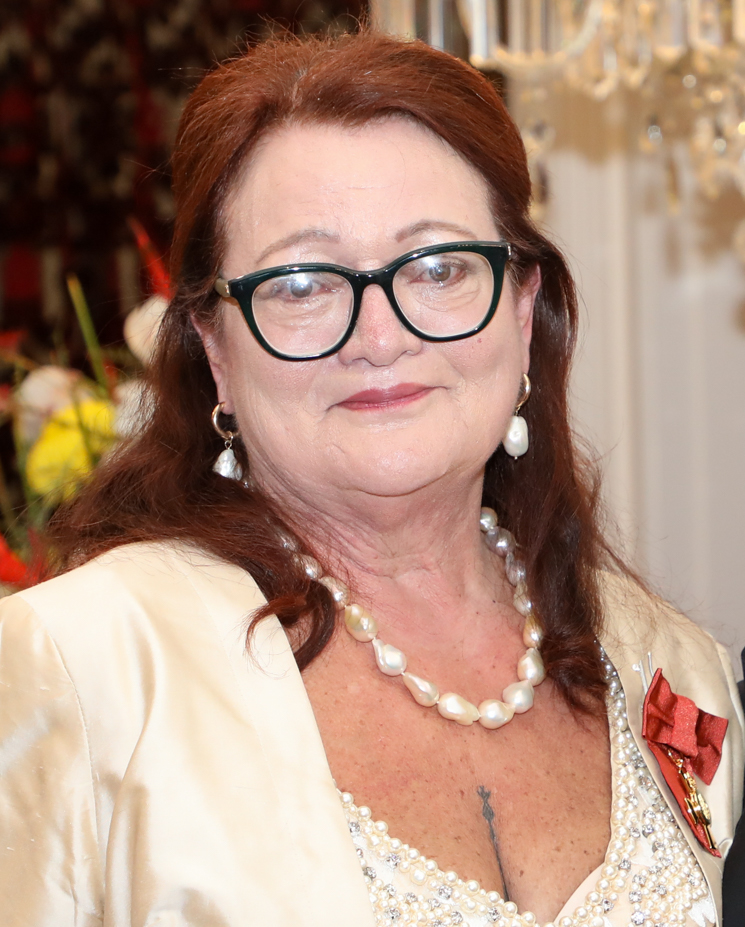
Debra Sorensen

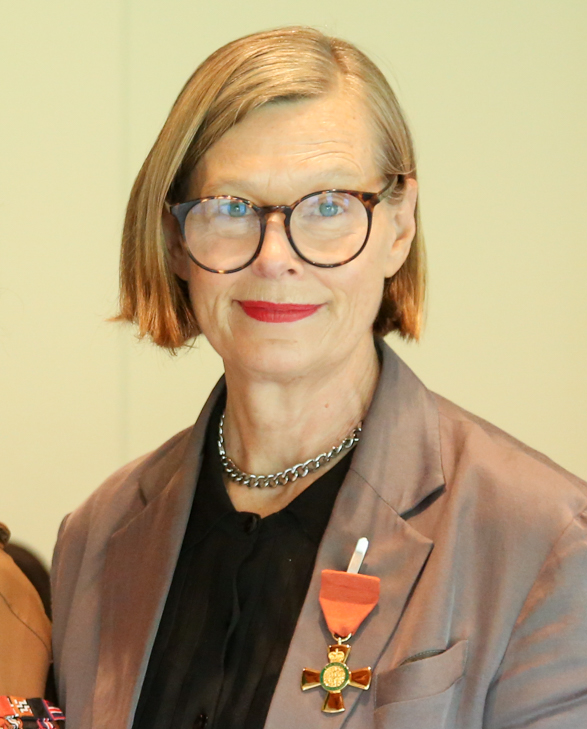
Kate Sylvester

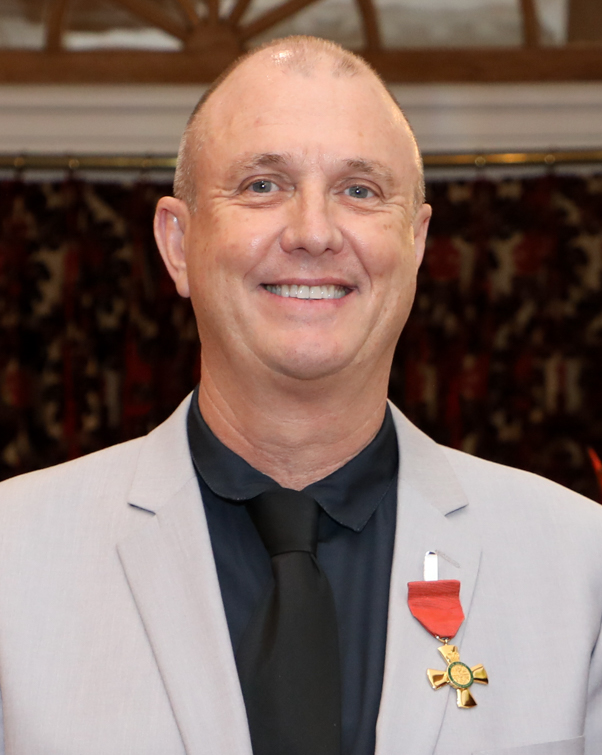
Iain Taylor

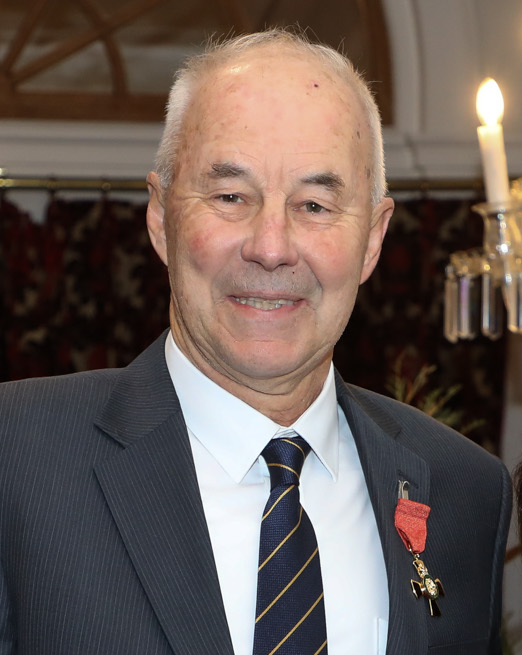
Murray Tilyard

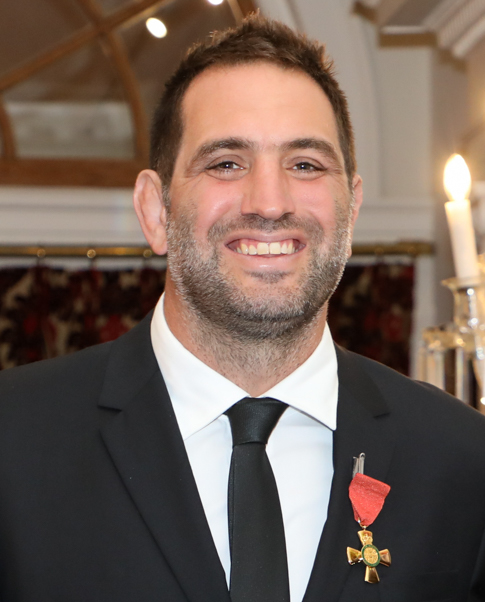
Sam Whitelock

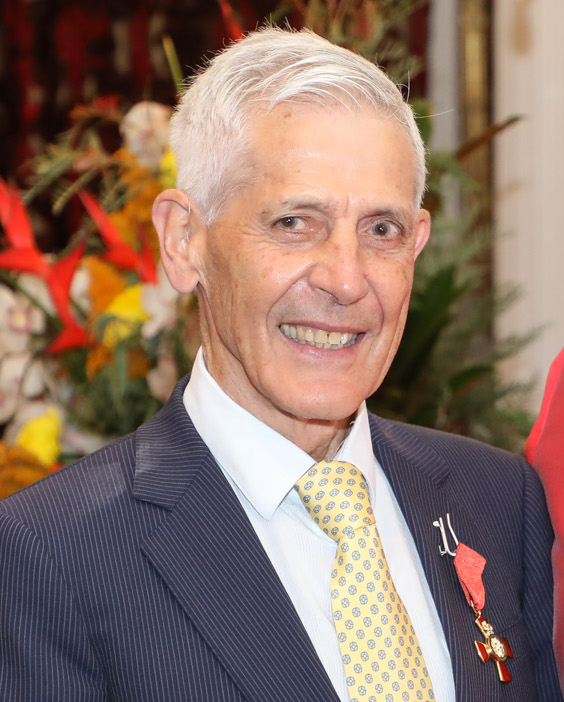
Bryce Wilkinson

=== Member (MNZM) ===
- Peter Wallace Allen – of Takaro. For services to disabled people.
- Dale Cameron Bailey – of Meadowbank. For services to education.
- Paula Val Baker – of Hamilton. For services to health governance and the community.
- Judith Anne Bell – of Shirley. For services to music education.
- Richard Marshall Lovelace Bull – of Mangawhai. For services to conservation and the community.
- Paul Francis Burns – of Prebbleton. For services to Search and Rescue and Fire and Emergency New Zealand.
- Michael John Dyer Camm – of Whangārei. For services to wildlife conservation.
- Susan Jayne Clement – of Island Bay. For services to education.
- Ross Anthony Cocker JP – of Westport. For services to Search and Rescue and the community.
- Dr Karen Ann Colgan – of Henderson Valley. For services to wildlife conservation and education.
- Linda Ann Cooper JP – of West Harbour. For services to the community.
- Professor Maria Carmela Dalli – of Brooklyn. For services to education.
- Priyani Therese de Silva-Currie – of Richmond. For services to multicultural communities, netball and civil engineering.
- Dr Makarena Diana Dudley – of Awanui. For services to people with dementia, particularly Māori.
- Ross James Craufurd Dunlop JP – of Hāwera. For services to local government.
- Iosefo Fa'afiu – of Māngere. For services to mental health, youth and the Pacific community.
- Anne Maria Fitisemanu – of Clarks Beach. For services to business.
- Julian Richmond Fitter – of Katikati. For services to conservation.
- Bronwyn Joy Groot – of Waiuku. For services to fraud prevention awareness.
- Noel Graham Harris – of Mount Maunganui. For services to the thoroughbred racing industry.
- Professor Rawinia Ruth Higgins – of Khandallah. For services to Māori language, education and governance.
- David Warwick Hodder – of Spreydon. For services to outdoor recreation and conservation.
- Dr Ingrid Louise Maria Huygens – of Hamilton East. For services to education and Māori.
- Leonard George Frederick Irvine – of Riverlea. For services to woodcraft and education.
- Marian Elizabeth Johnson – of Richmond Hill. For services to technology and business.
- Shelley Aroha Katae – of Westmere. For services to Māori and Pacific communities.
- David John Kent – of Kirwee. For services to the deaf and hard-of-hearing community.
- Dinesh Kumar Khadka JP – of Bucklands Beach. For services to the Nepalese community.
- Tania Phillippa Kingi – of Papatoetoe. For services to Māori and people with disabilities.
- Dr Malcolm Erskine Legget – of Herne Bay. For services to cardiology. (Note: Deceased. His Majesty's approval of this award took effect on 31 October 2024, prior to the date of death.)
- Nicola Maree Ataria MacDonald – of Stonefields. For services to the environment.
- Deborah Claire Mackenzie – of Auckland. For services to victims of domestic violence.
- Dr Cedric Paul Malpass – of Taumarunui. For services to health.
- Lachlan John Marshall – of Christchurch Central. For services to water polo.
- Adele Marie Mason – of Te Aro. For services to New Zealand-Asia relations.
- Duncan Paul Matthews – of Grey Lynn. For services to rainbow communities.
- Dr John Leslie McKoy – of Plimmerton. For services to fisheries science and environment management.
- Ross John McQueen – of Rangiora. For services to the community.
- Emeritus Professor Asad Mohsin – of Hamilton East. For services to the Muslim community and education.
- Janice Molloy – of Waikanae. For services to wildlife conservation.
- Sheryll Ann Ofner – of St Johns. For services to education.
- Professor Louise Claire Parr-Brownlie – of Mosgiel. For services to neuroscience.
- Daniel Oshana Pato – of Grey Lynn. For services to the hairdressing industry.
- Kirsten Pauline Eddy Patterson – of Waterloo. For services to governance and women.
- John Kenneth Peters – of Waitarere Beach. For services to governance and palliative care.
- Ian Martyn Pickard – of Papamoa Beach. For services to Fire and Emergency New Zealand.
- Billie-Jean Potaka Ayton – of Kaiti. For services to education and Māori.
- Tania Mateohorere-Carole Pouwhare – of Mount Eden. For services to Māori and Pacific communities, and the environment.
- Sarah Jane McDonald Rae – of Avenal. For services to choral music.
- Ian Dugald Reid – of Napier South. For services to musical theatre.
- Alan Kenneth Richards – of Mana. For services to the New Zealand Police and education.
- Norefjell Jacquiline Marama Tanga Royal JP – of Ōrākei. For services to Māori and governance.
- Hilary Dawn Sangster – of Ranfurly. For services to governance.
- Dr Rachel Simon-Kumar – of Auckland. For services to women's studies, health research and to ethnic communities.
- Roy Martin Sloan – of Winton. For services to conservation and game hunting.
- Dr Hilary Anne Smith – of Awapuni. For services to linguistics and the community.
- Dr Helen Julia Snell – of Hokowhitu. For services to nursing and diabetes care.
- Sharon Carol Stevens-Cottle – of Masterton. For services to dance and theatre.
- Michael Leslie Burton Styles – of Paraparaumu Beach. For services to people with dyslexia and education.
- Associate Professor Linda Naumai Te Aho – of Beerescourt. For services to Māori and legal education.
- Gary Raymond Trail – of Tikipunga. For services to martial arts, particularly jiu-jitsu.
- Keith Winton Trembath – of Paeroa. For services to the community, agriculture and education.
- Kateryna Turska – of Auckland Central. For services to the Ukrainian community.
- Anita Gay Varga – of Okauia. For services to women and the construction industry.
- Melissa Amy Vining – of Winton. For services to charitable fundraising and the community.
- Belinda Henderson Walker – of Taupō. For services to the community.
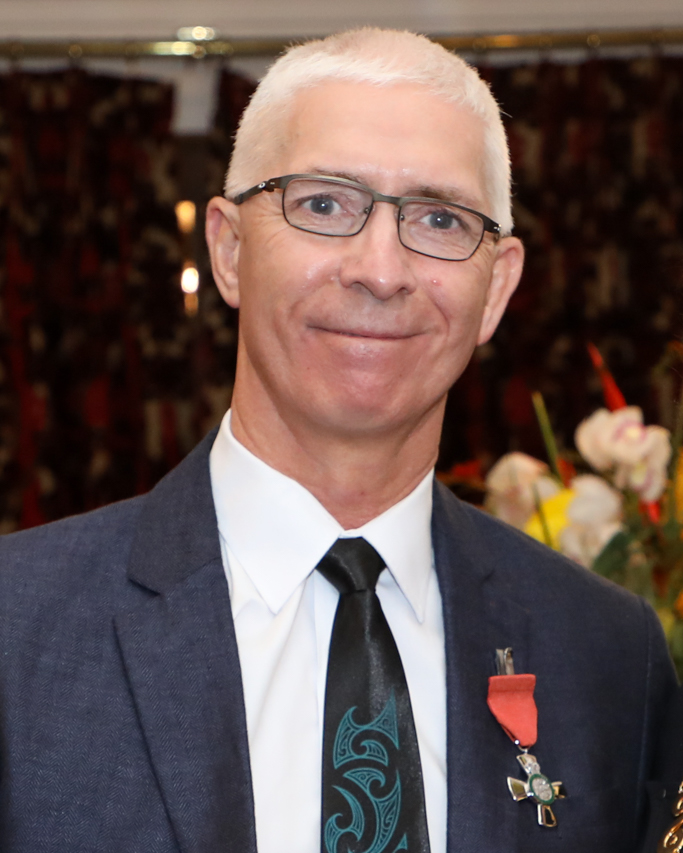
Peter Allen

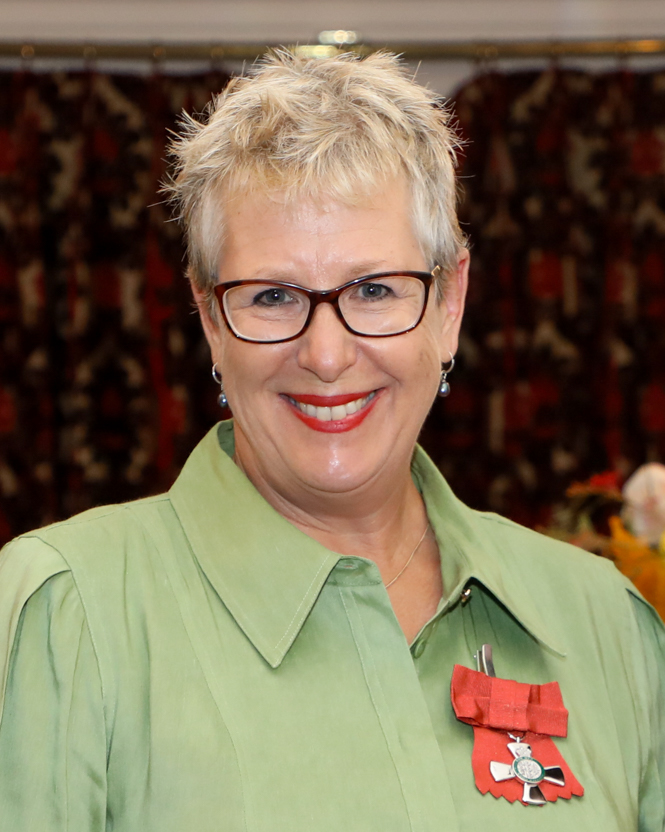
Paula Baker

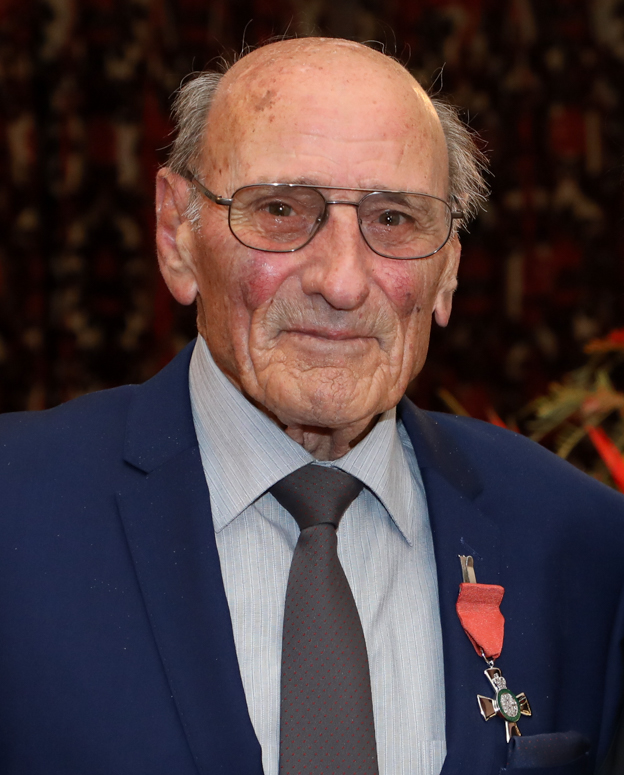
Richard Bull

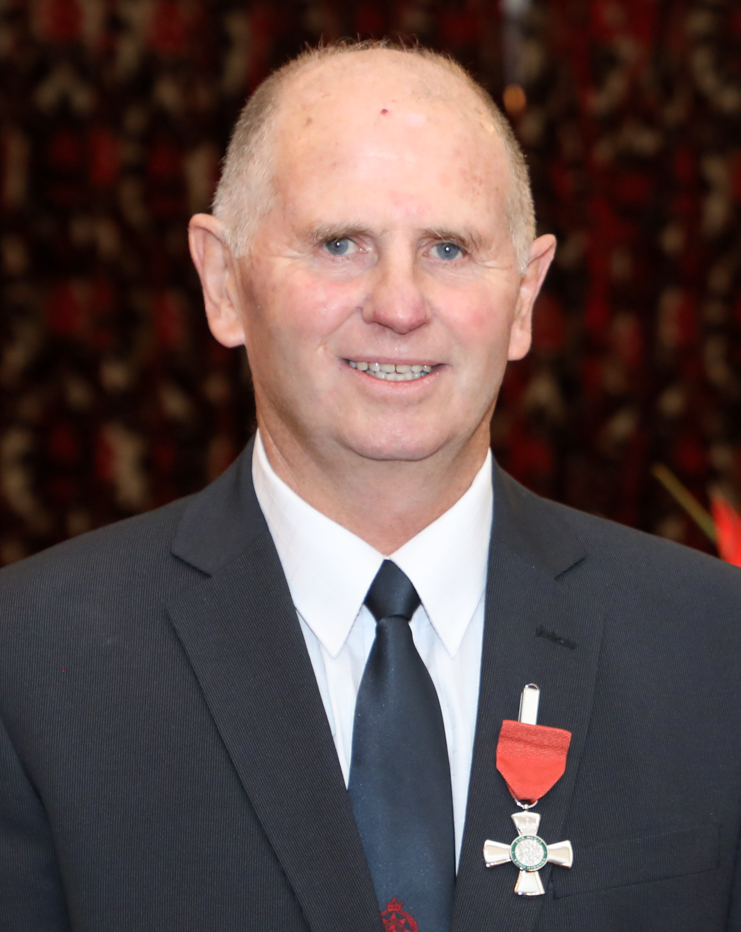
Paul Burns

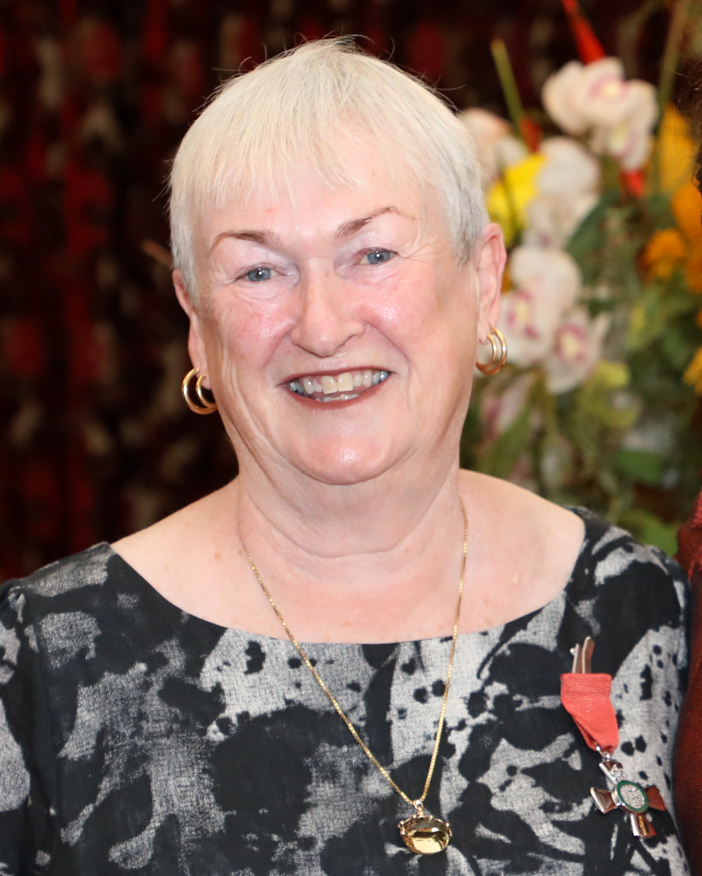
Sue Clement

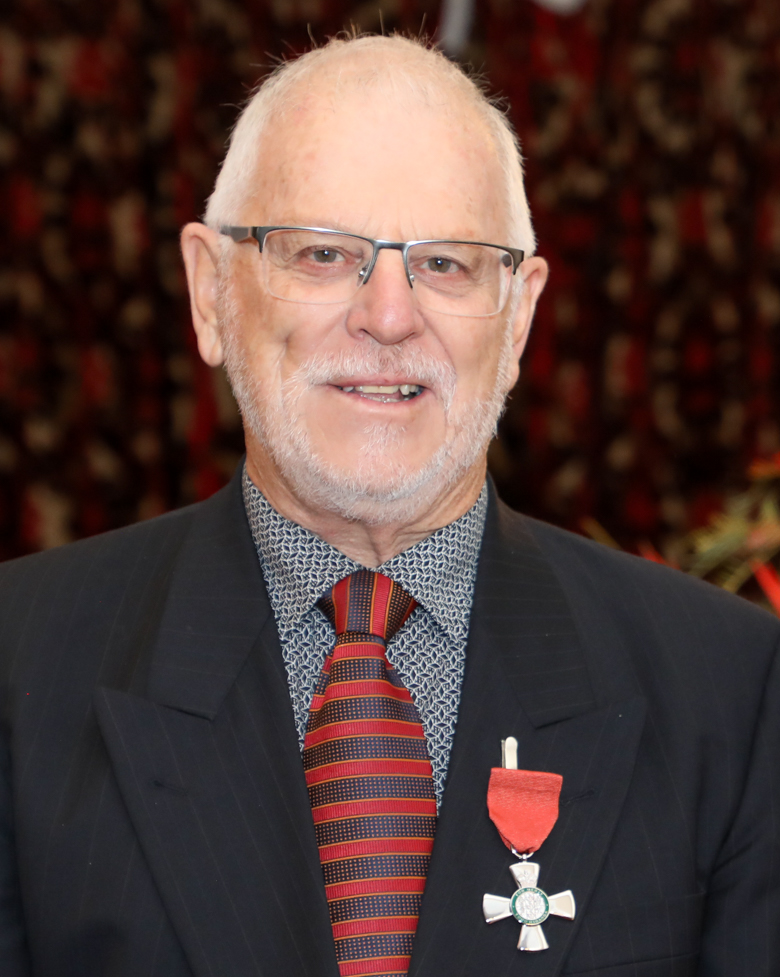
Ross Cocker

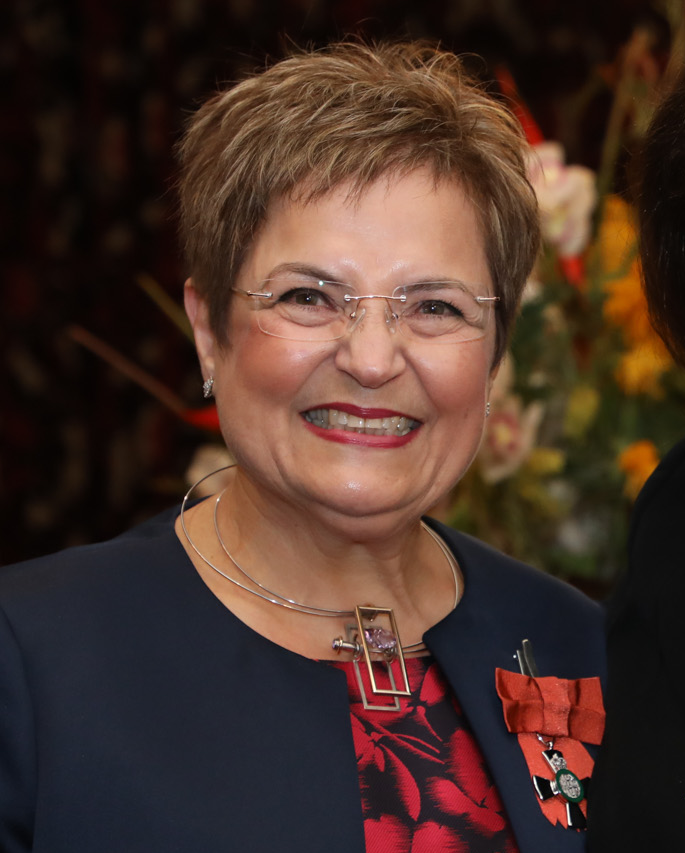
Carmen Dalli

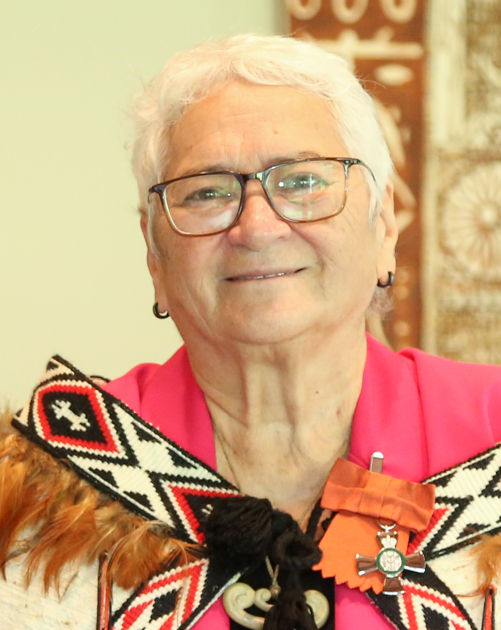
Makarena Dudley

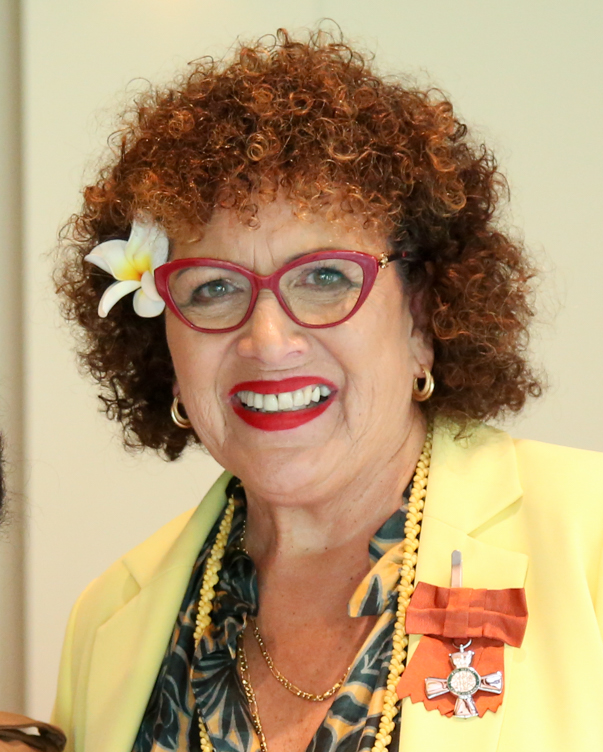
Anne Fitisemanu

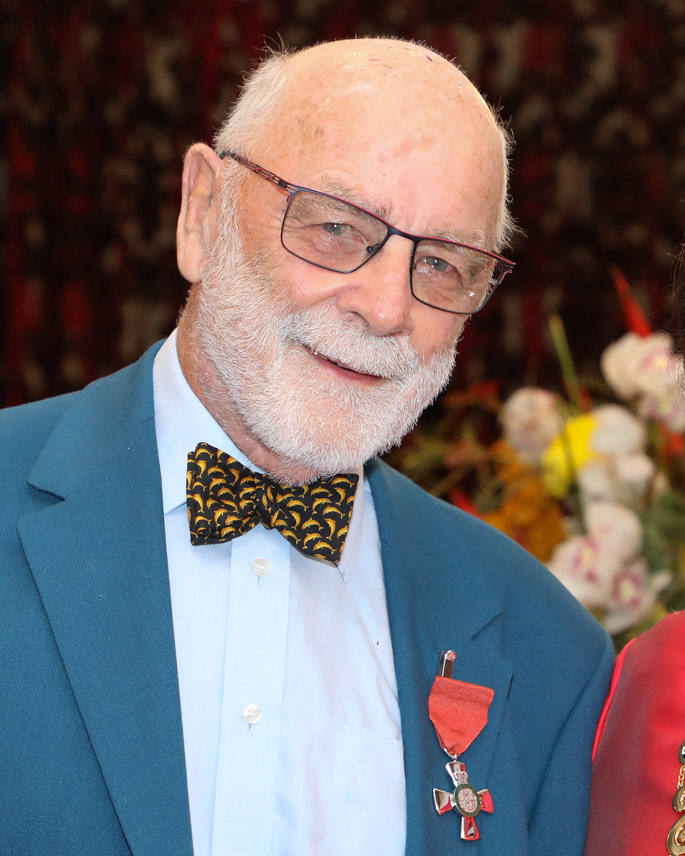
Julian Fitter

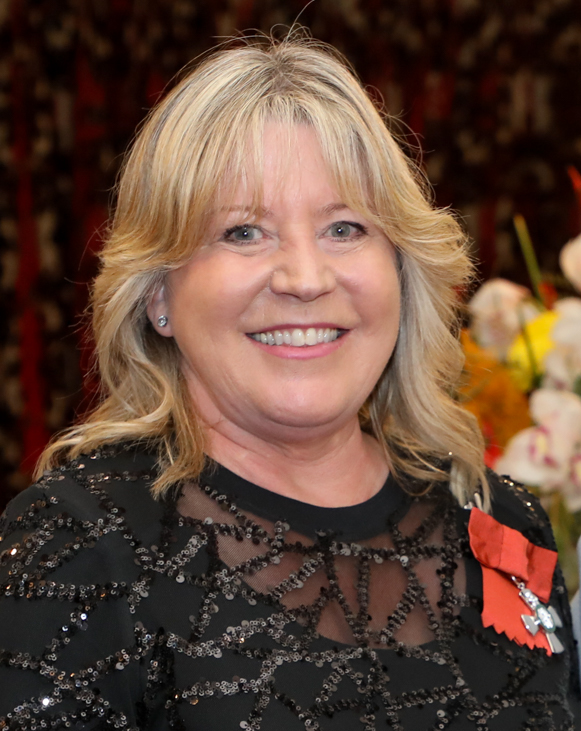
Bronwyn Groot

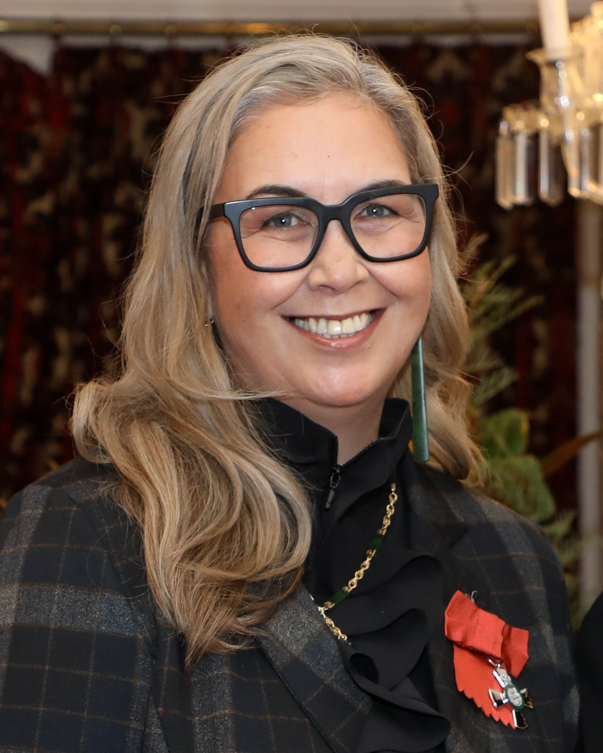
Rawinia Higgins

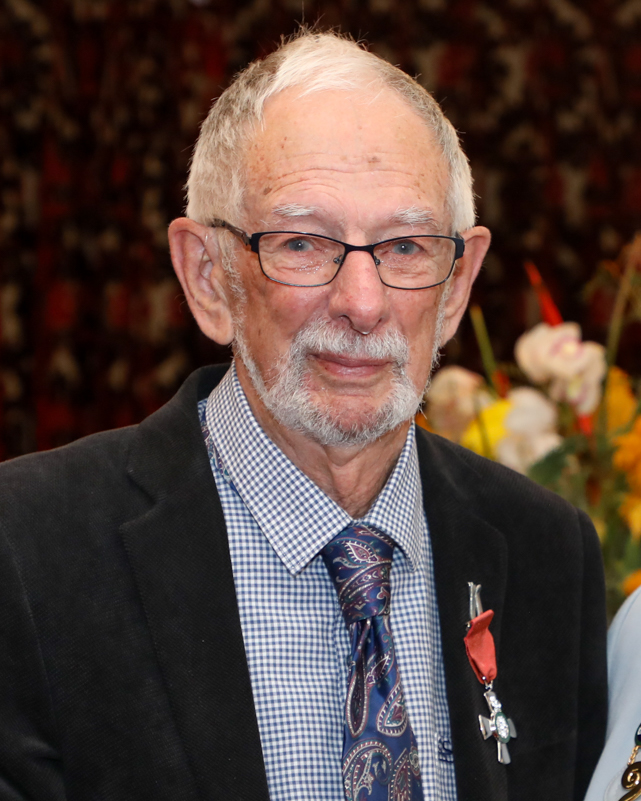
David Hodder

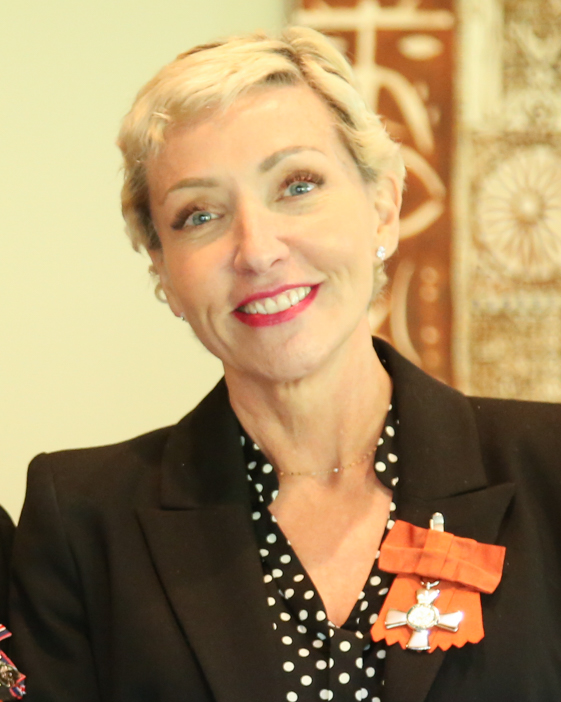
Marian Johnson

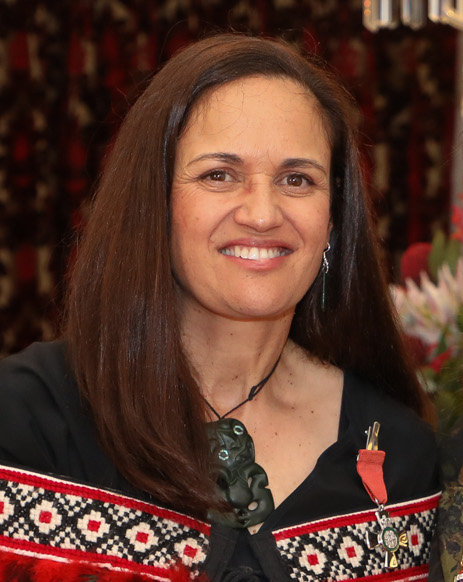
Shelley Katae

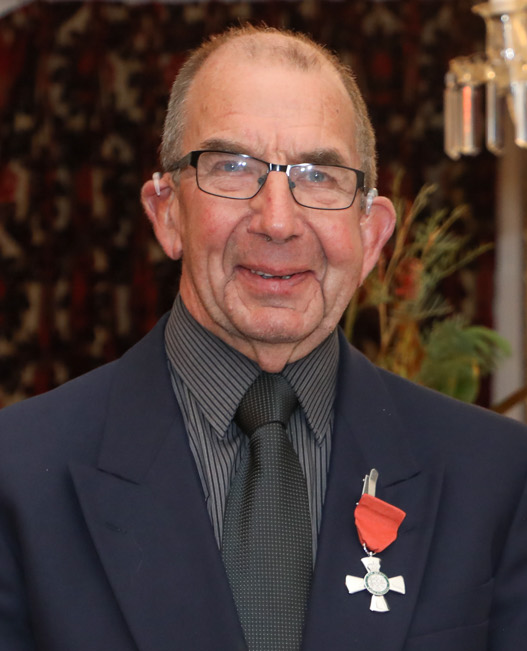
David Kent

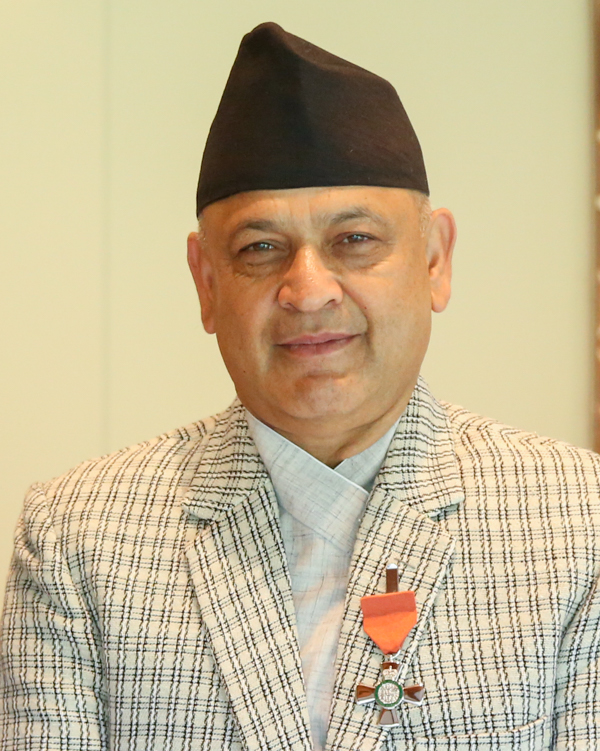
Dinesh Khadka

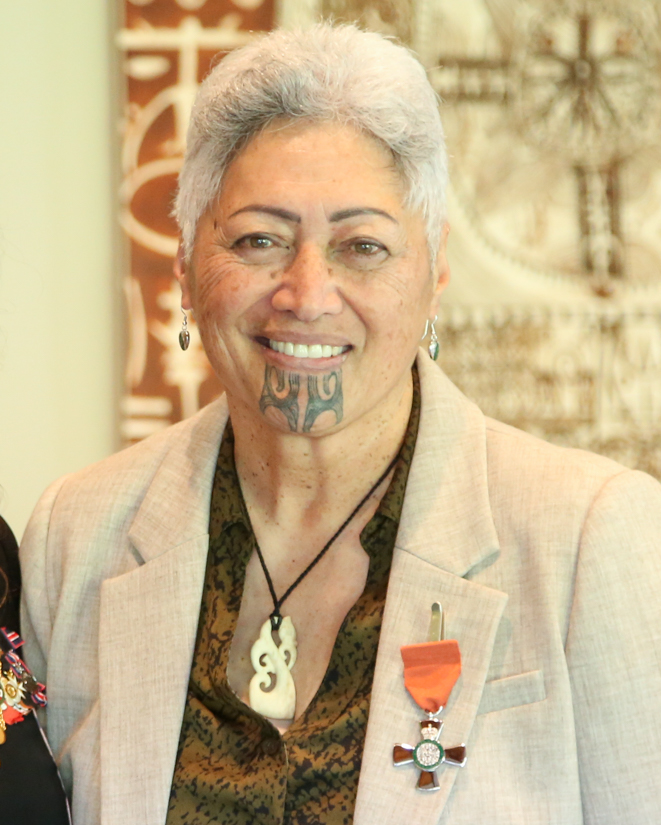
Tania Kingi

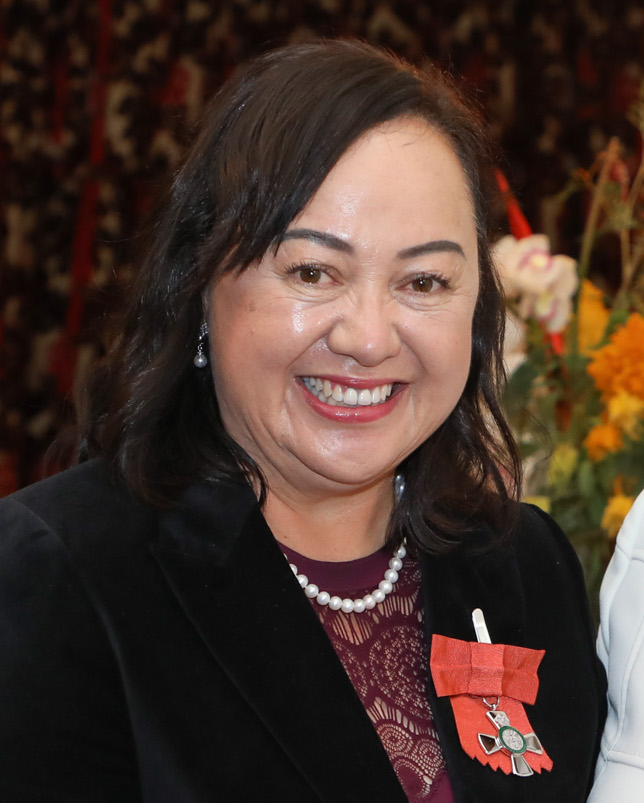
Nicola MacDonald

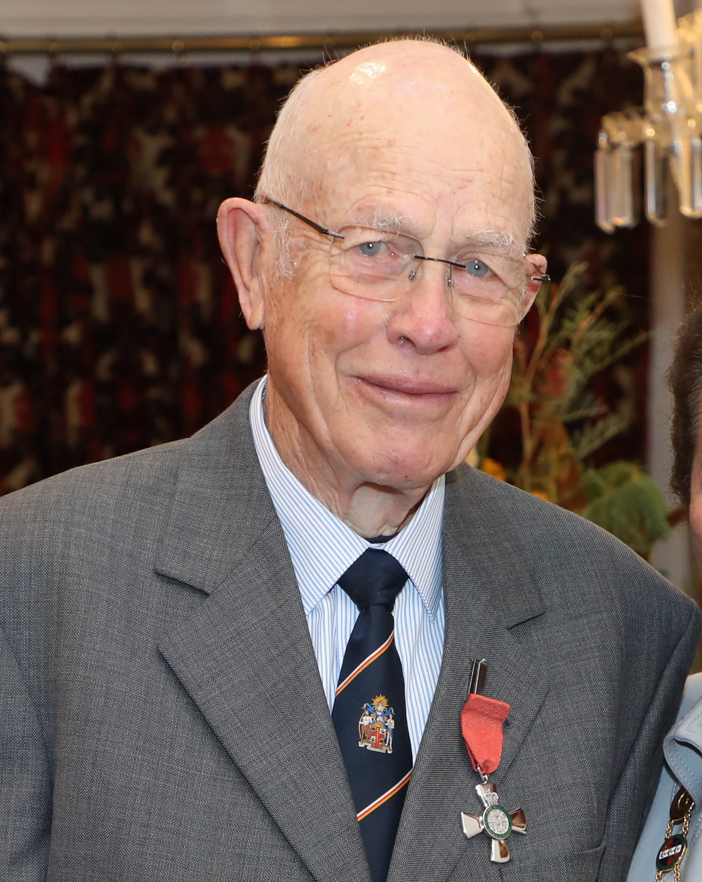
Paul Malpass

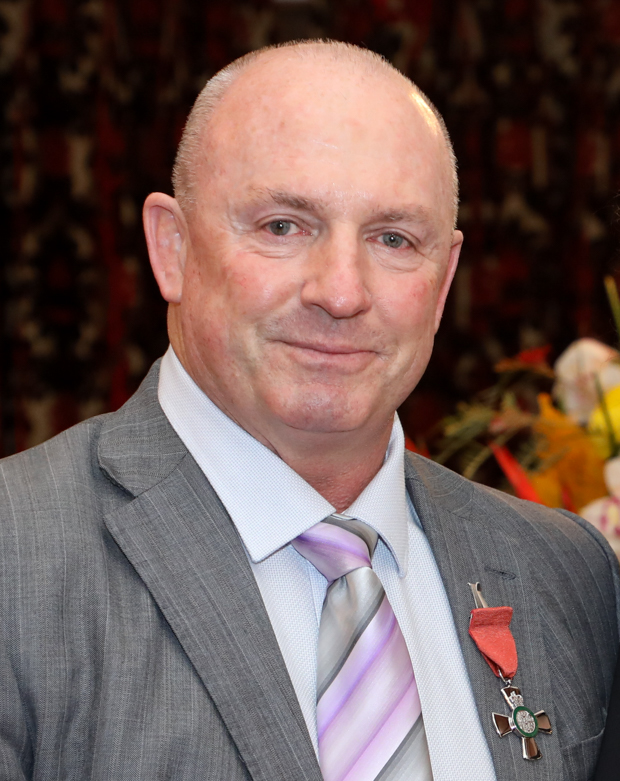
Lachie Marshall

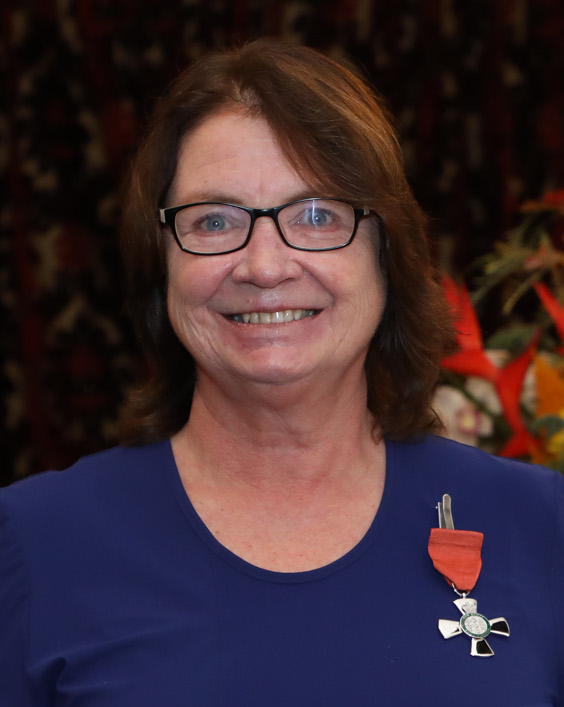
Adele Mason

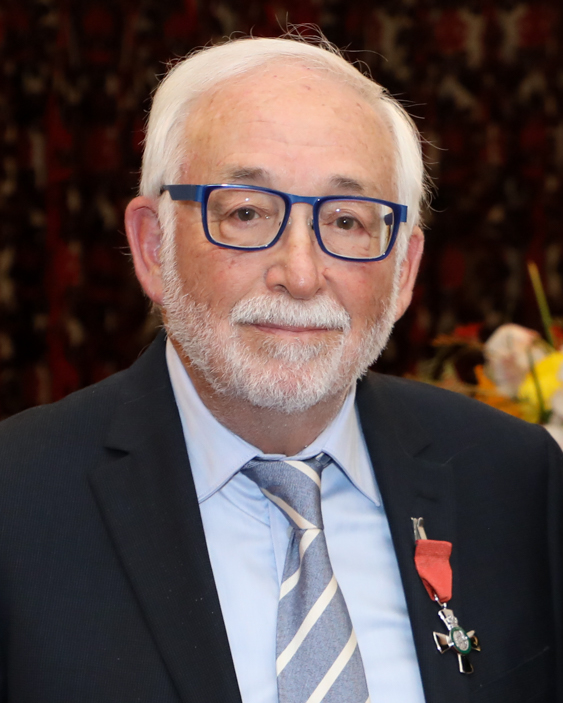
John McKoy

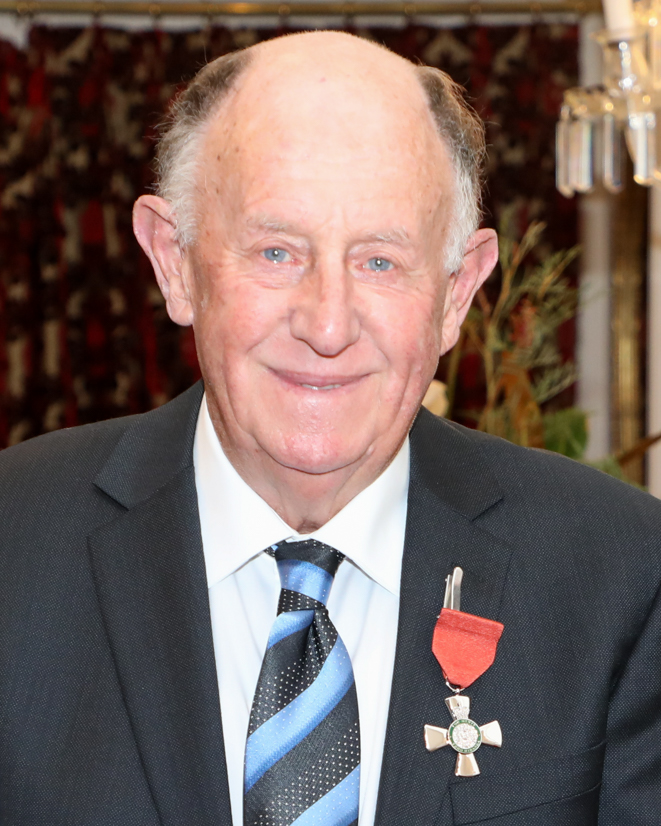
Ross McQueen

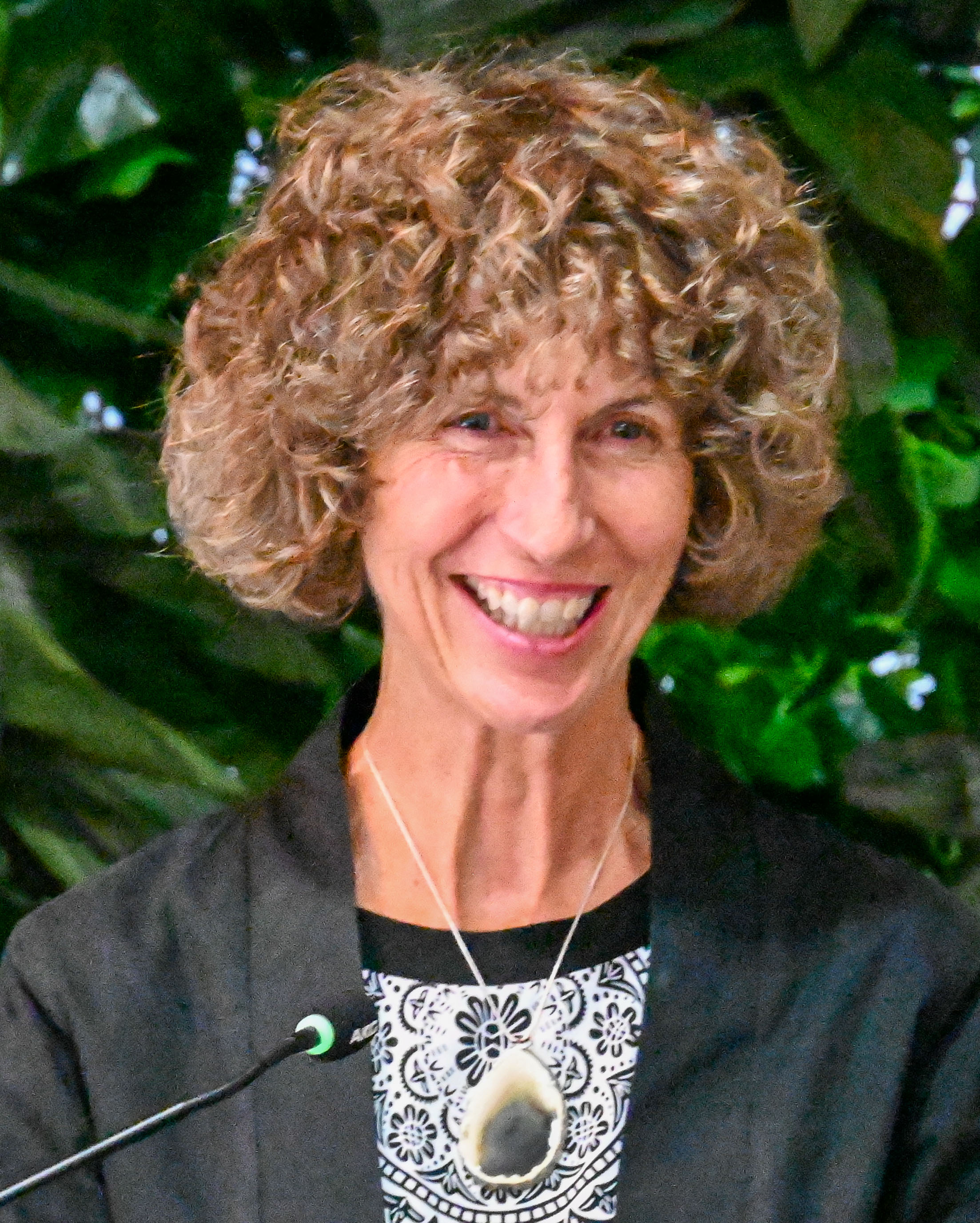
Janice Molloy

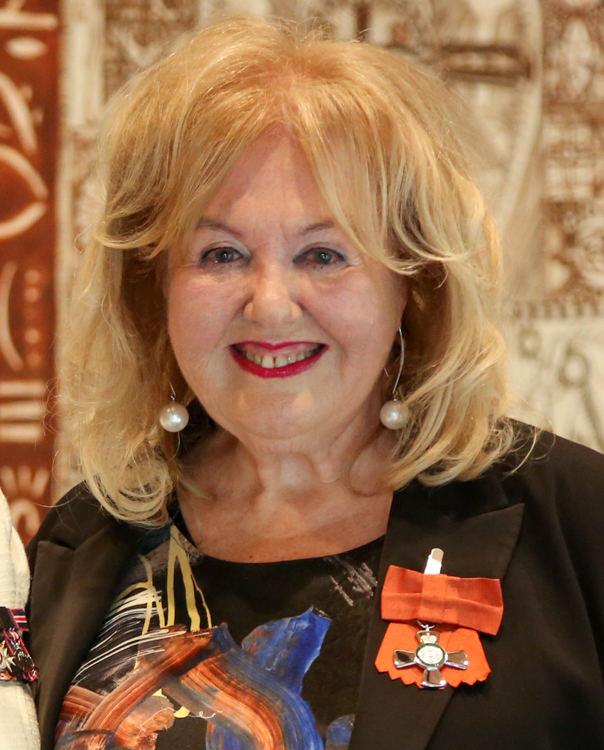
Sheryll Ofner

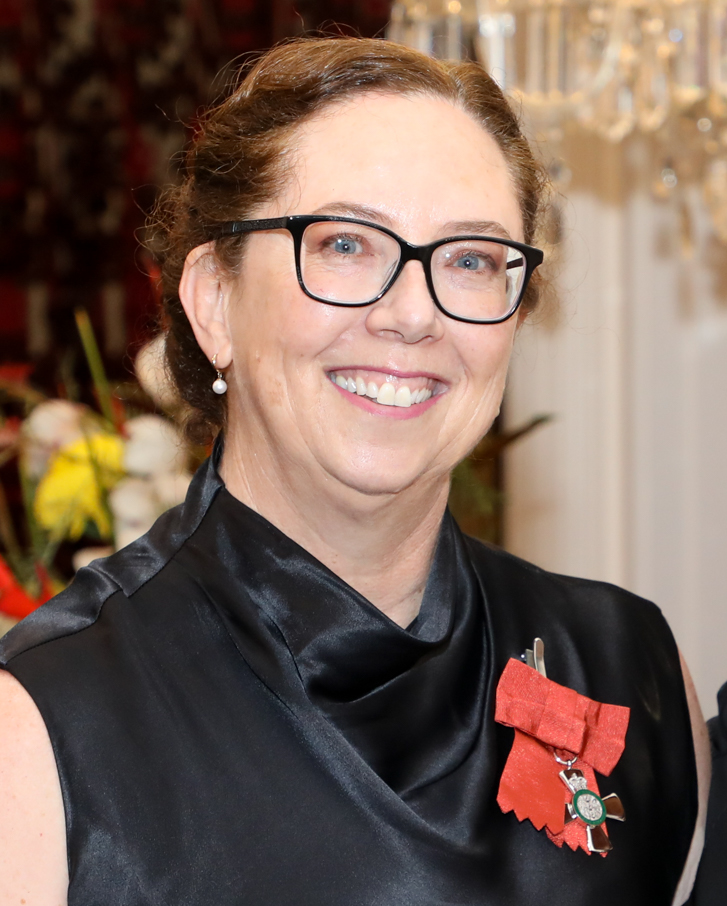
Louise Parr‑Brownlie

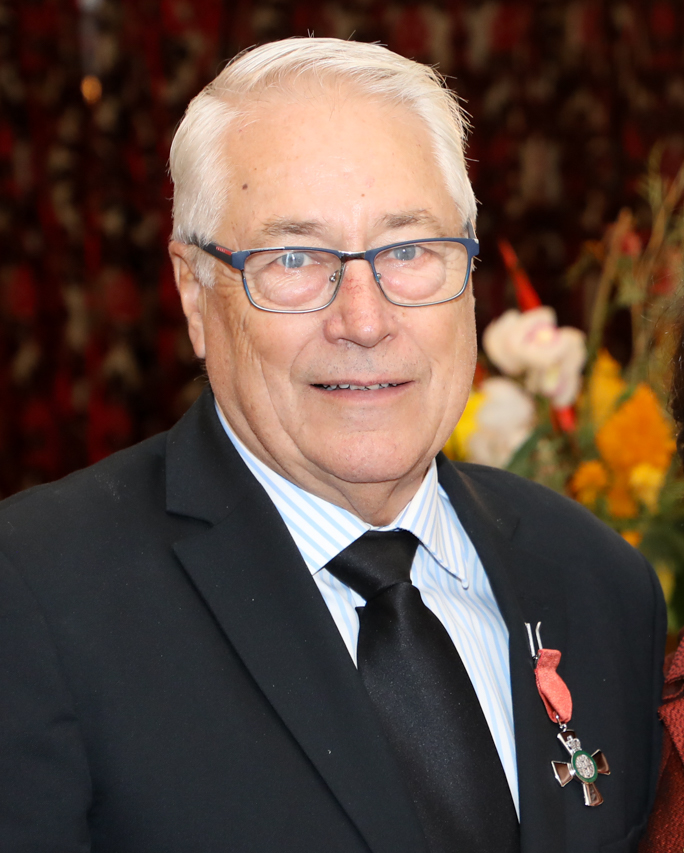
Ian Pickard

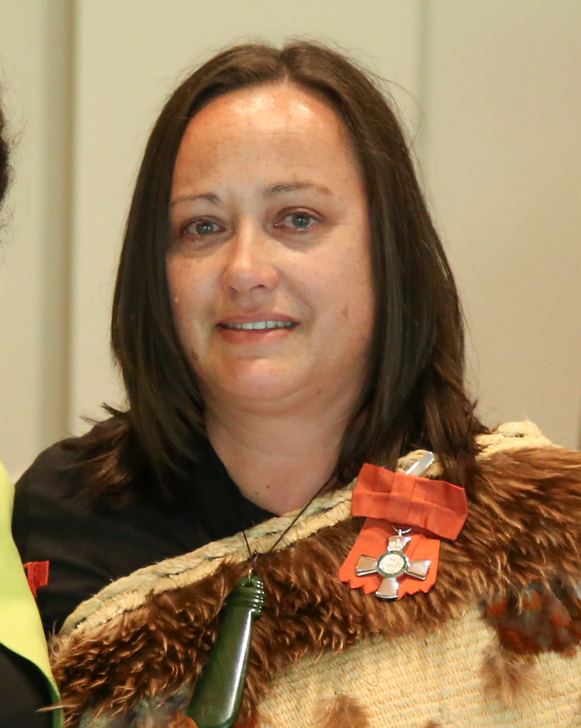
Billie-Jean Potaka Ayton

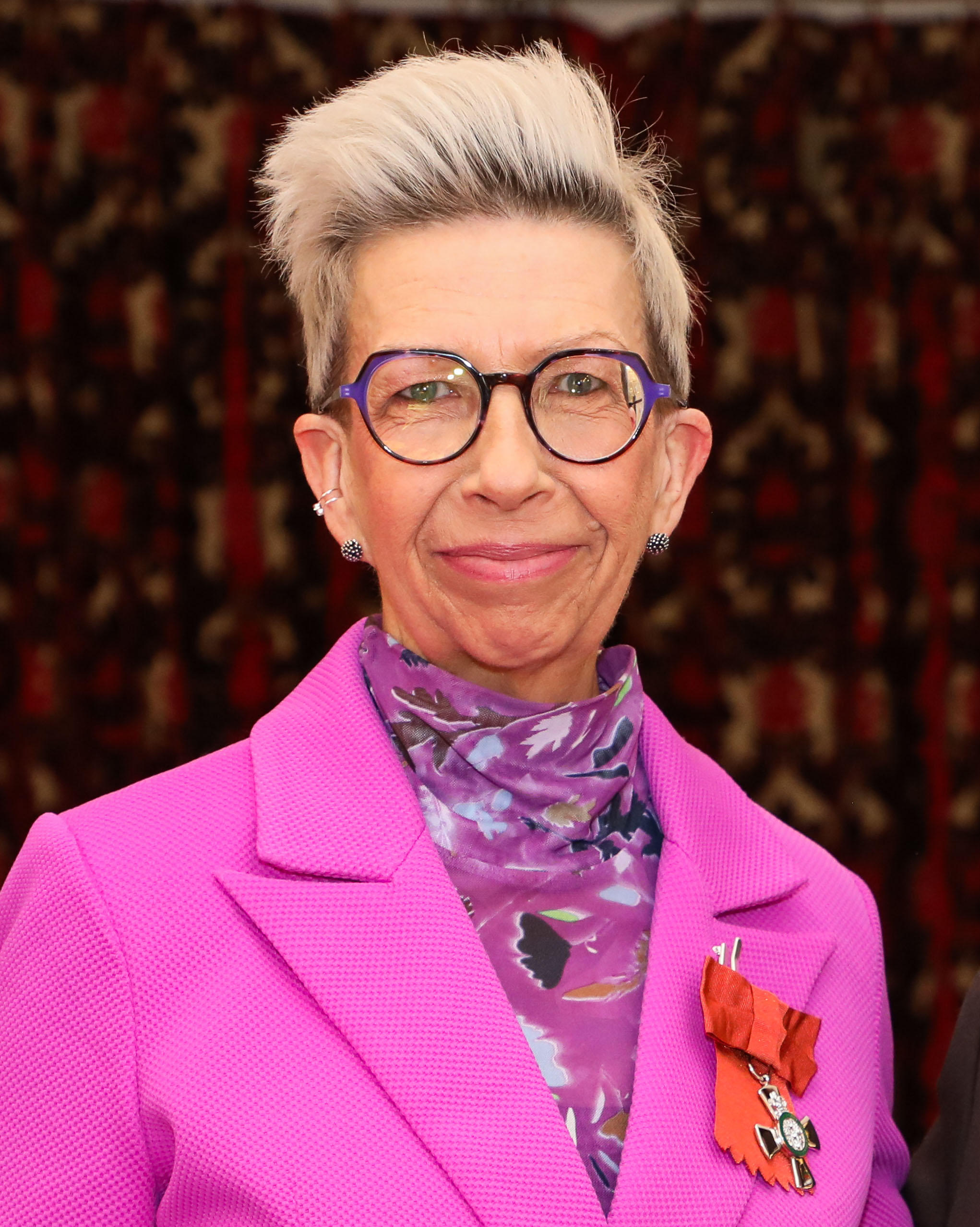
Sarah Rae

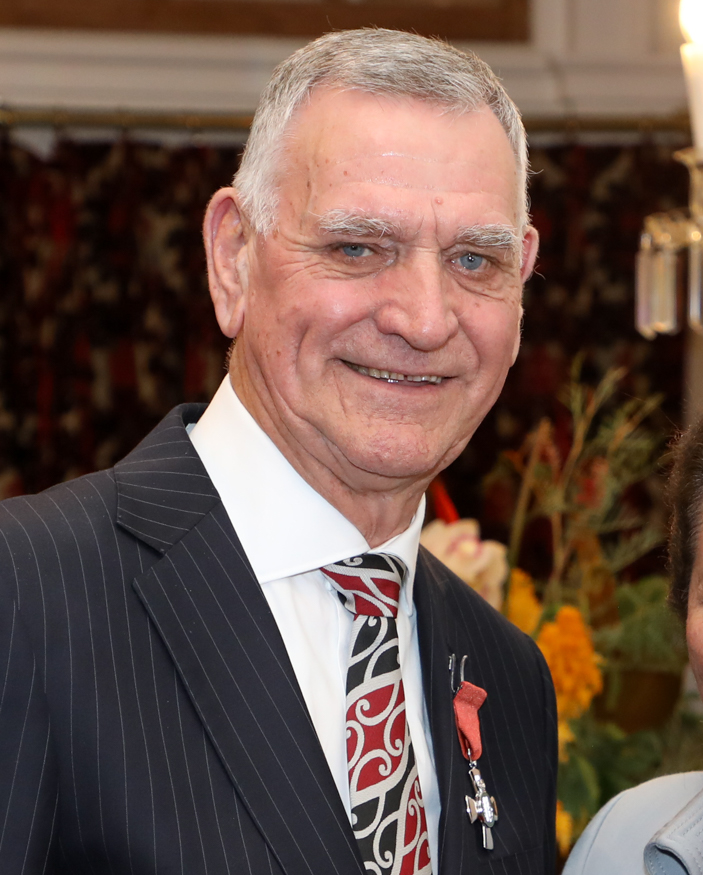
Alan Richards

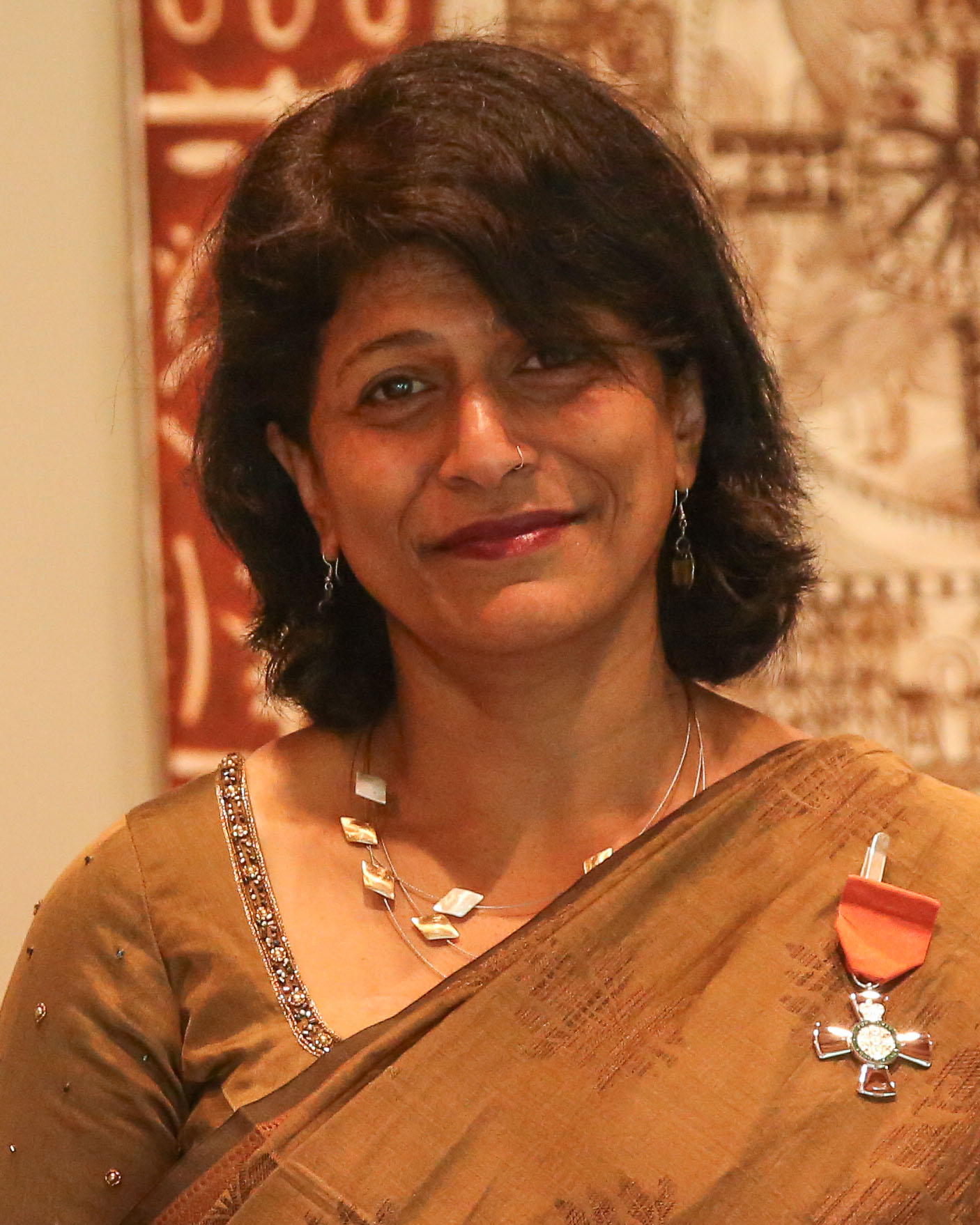
Rachel Simon‑Kumar

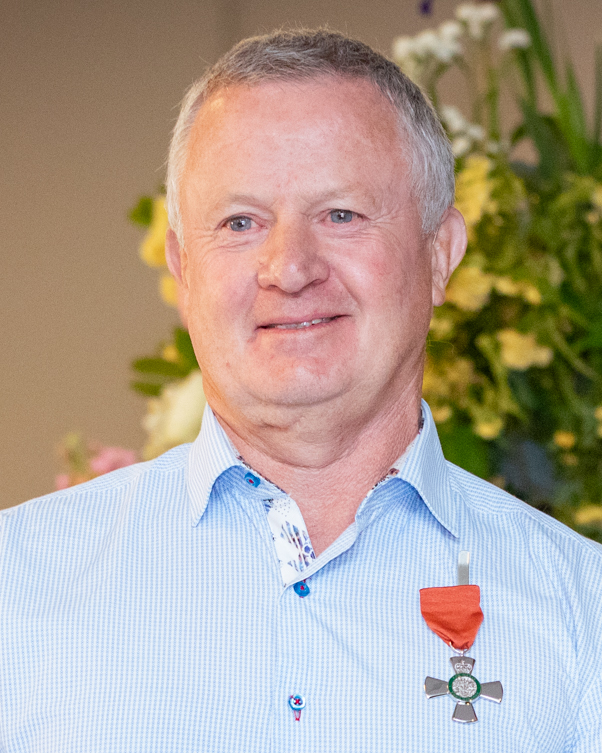
Roy Sloan

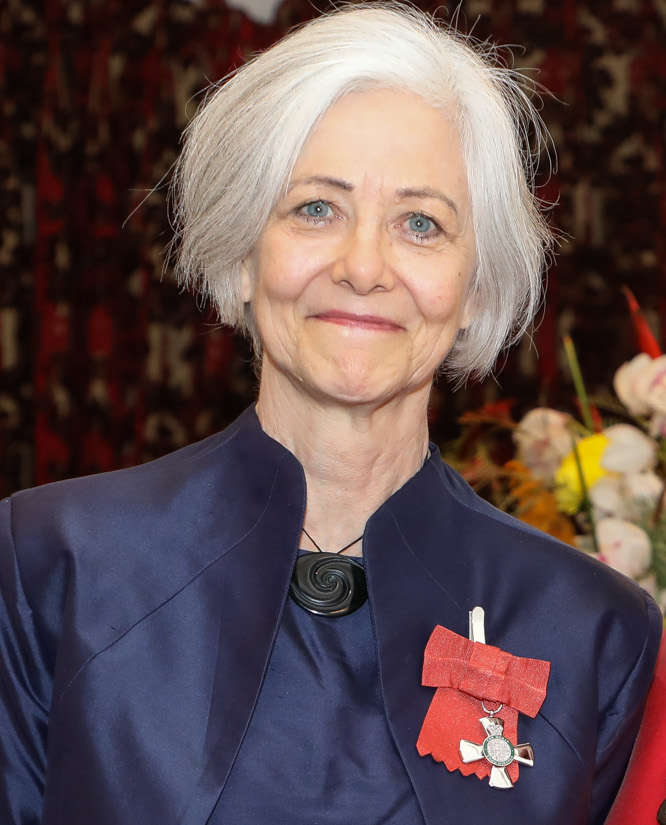
Hilary Smith

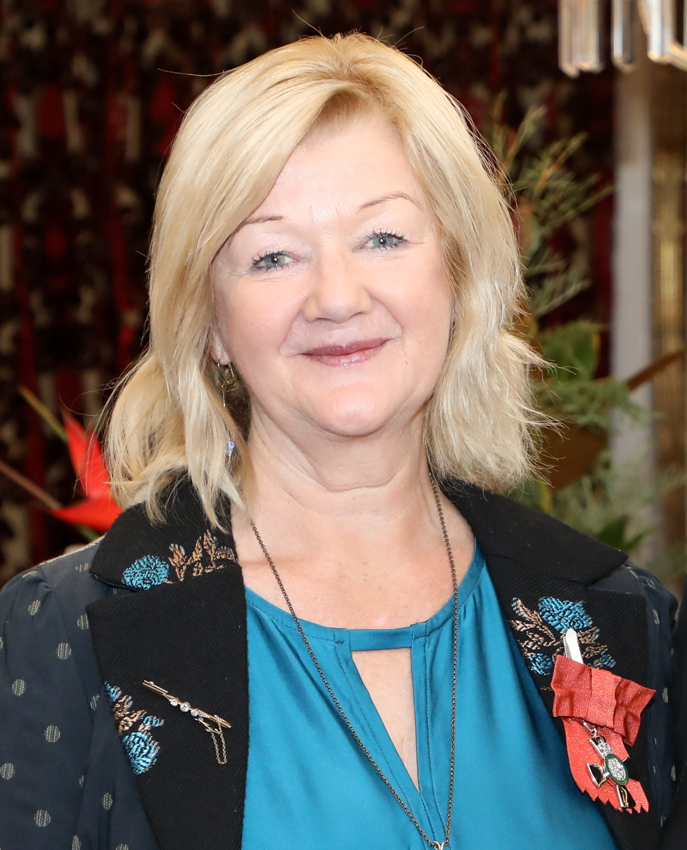
Helen Snell

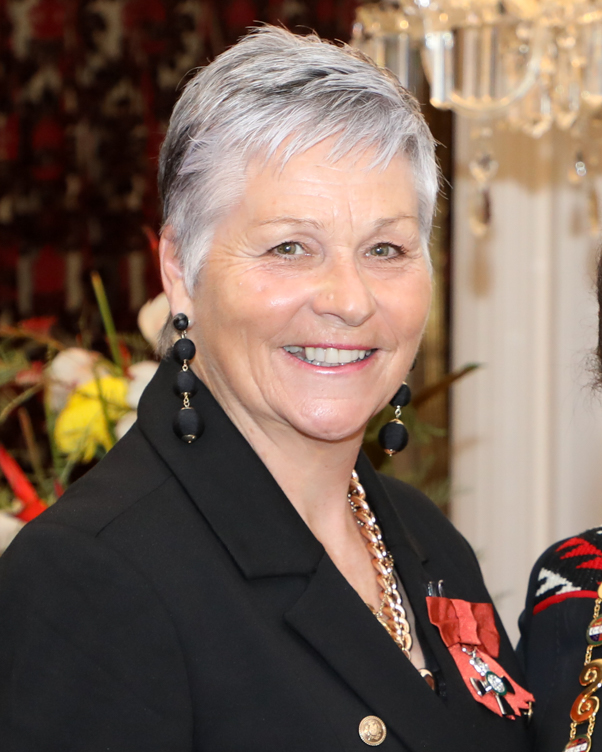
Sharon Stevens‑Cottle

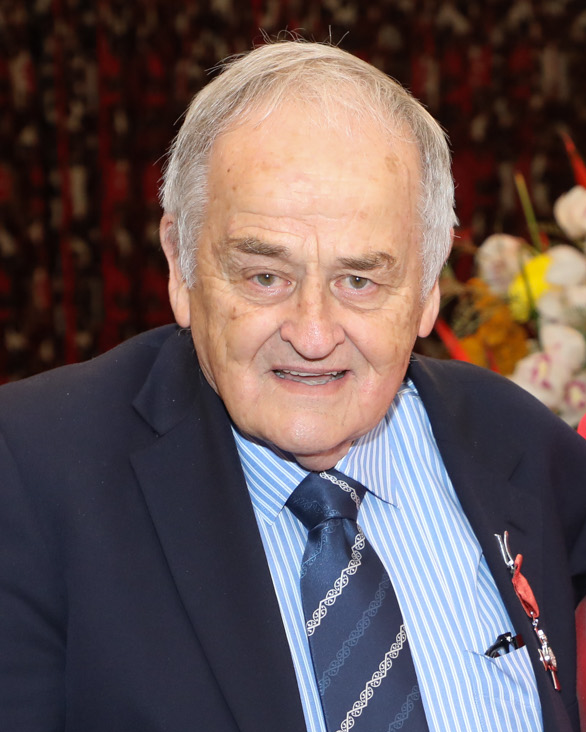
Mike Styles

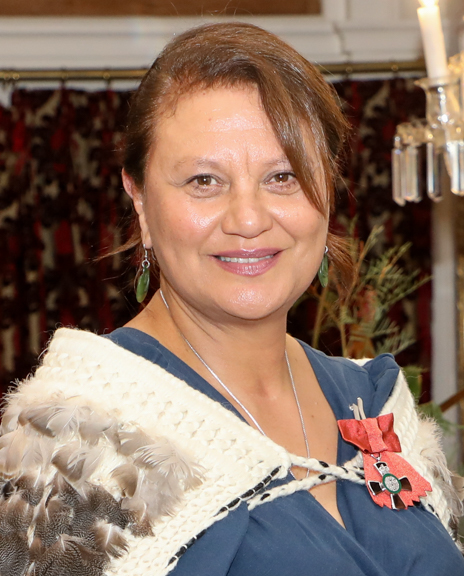
Linda Te Aho

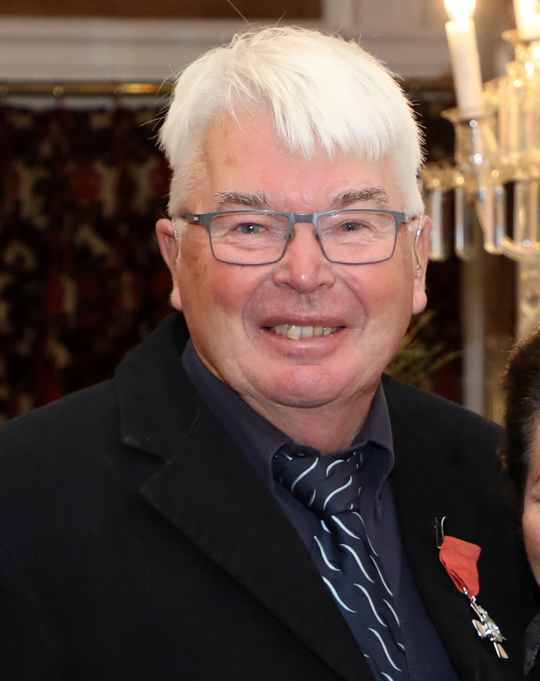
Keith Trembath

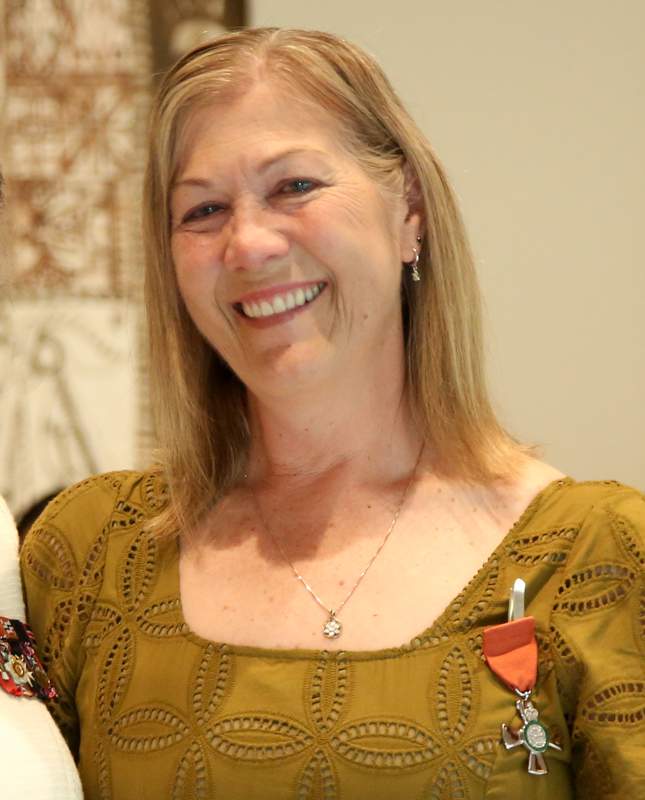
Anita Varga

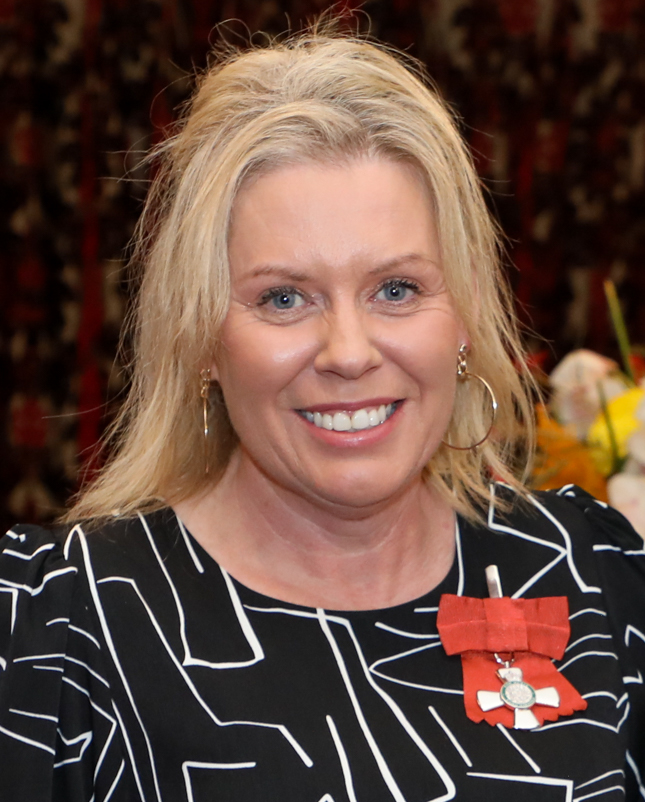
Melissa Vining

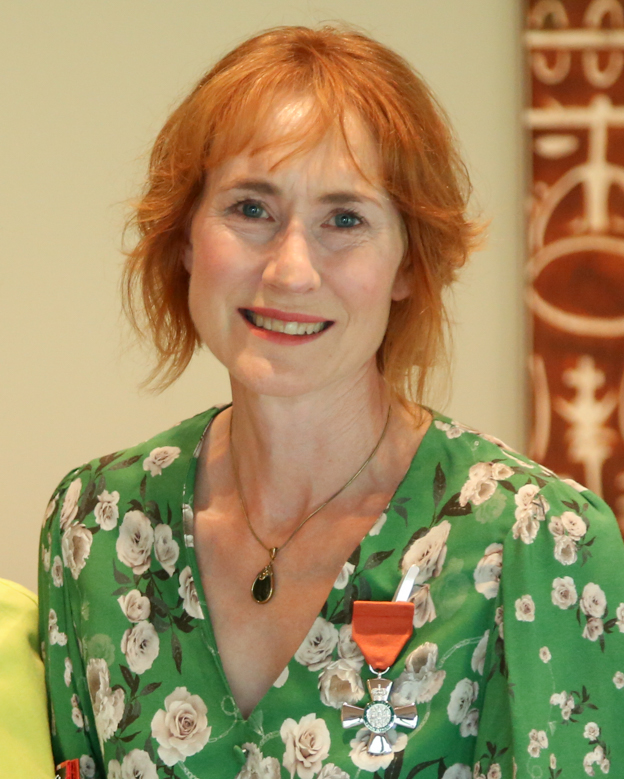
Belinda Walker

== Companion of the King's Service Order (KSO) ==
- Rūpene Paul Amato – of Wairoa. For services to survivors of abuse in care.
- Jocelyn Anne Armstrong – of St Johns. For services to interfaith communities.
- Barry Joseph de Geest – of Papakura. For services to disabled people.
- James William Goodwin – of Woolston. For services to survivors of abuse in care.
- Associate Professor Tristram Richard Ingham ONZM – of Karori. For services to survivors of abuse in care.
- Leoni Frances McInroe – of Auckland. For services to survivors of abuse in care.
- Paora Crawford Moyle – of Thames. For services to survivors of abuse in care.
- Moeapulu Frances Eileen Tagaloa – of Massey. For services to survivors of abuse in care.
- Keith Vernon Wiffin – of Te Aro. For services to survivors of abuse in care.
- Gary Michael Williams MNZM – of Papanui. For services to survivors of abuse in care.
- Paul Andrew Zentveld – of Mount Roskill. For services to survivors of abuse in care.
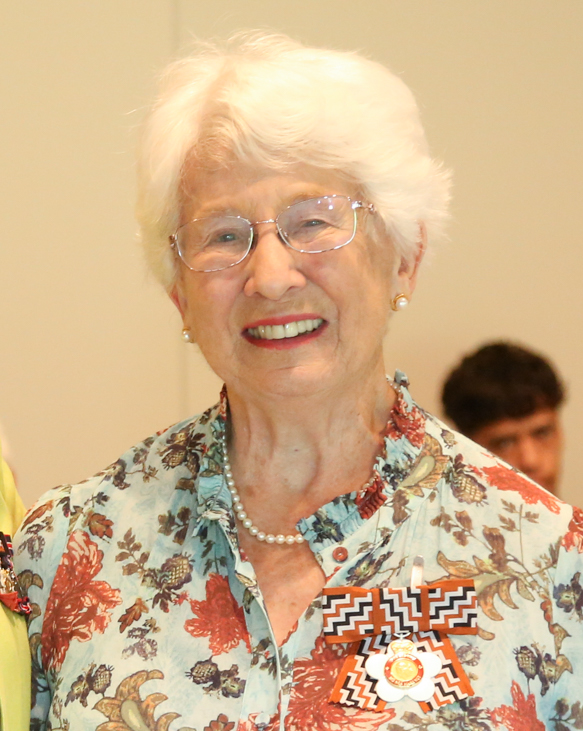
Jocelyn Armstrong

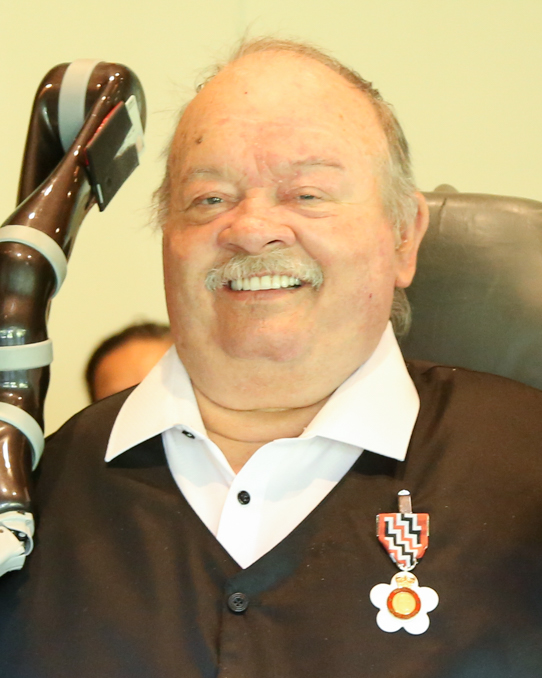
Barry de Geest

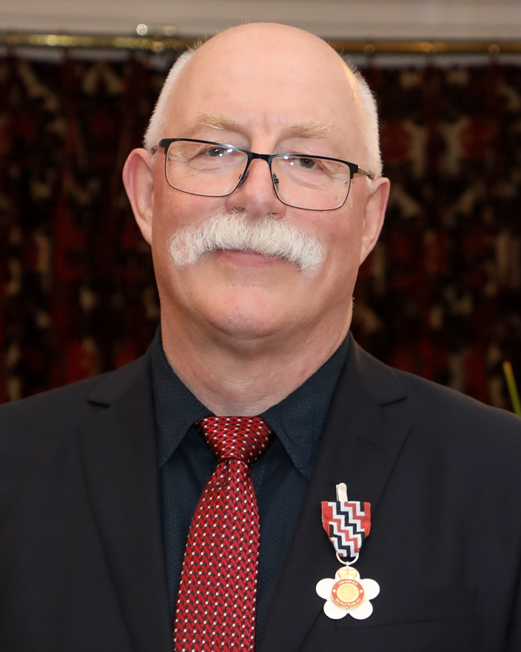
Jim Goodwin

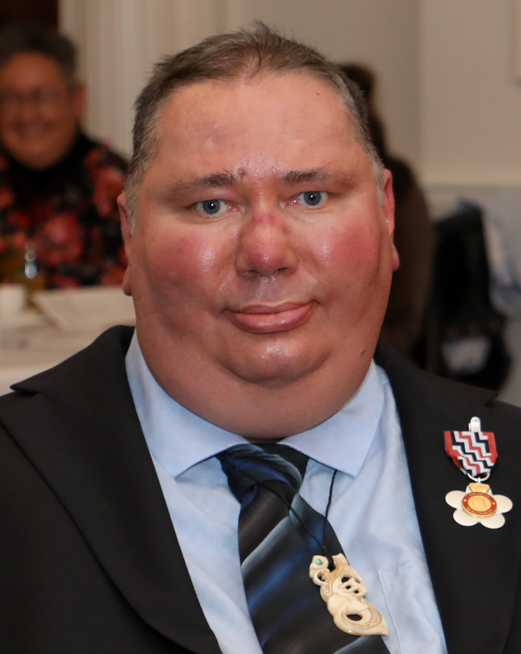
Tristram Ingham

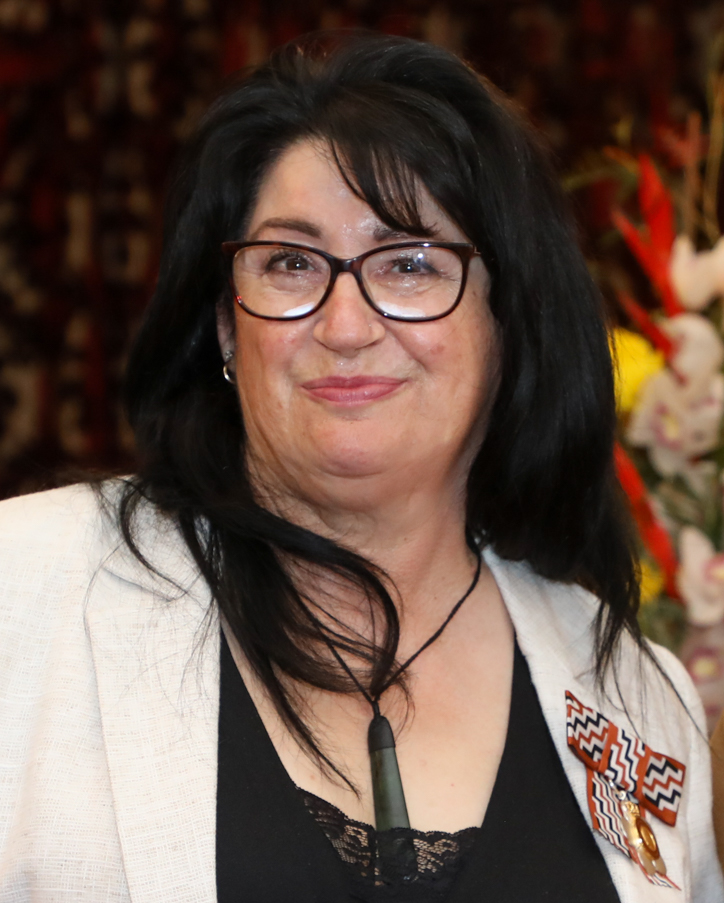
Leoni McInroe

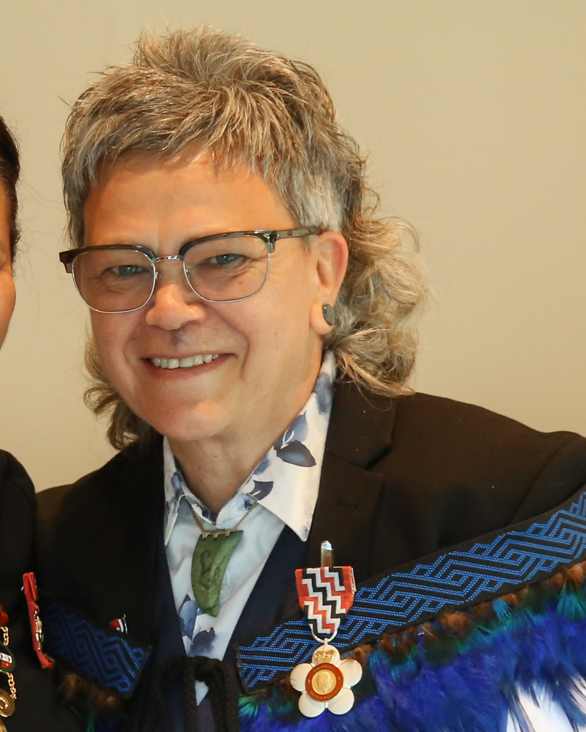
Paora Moyle

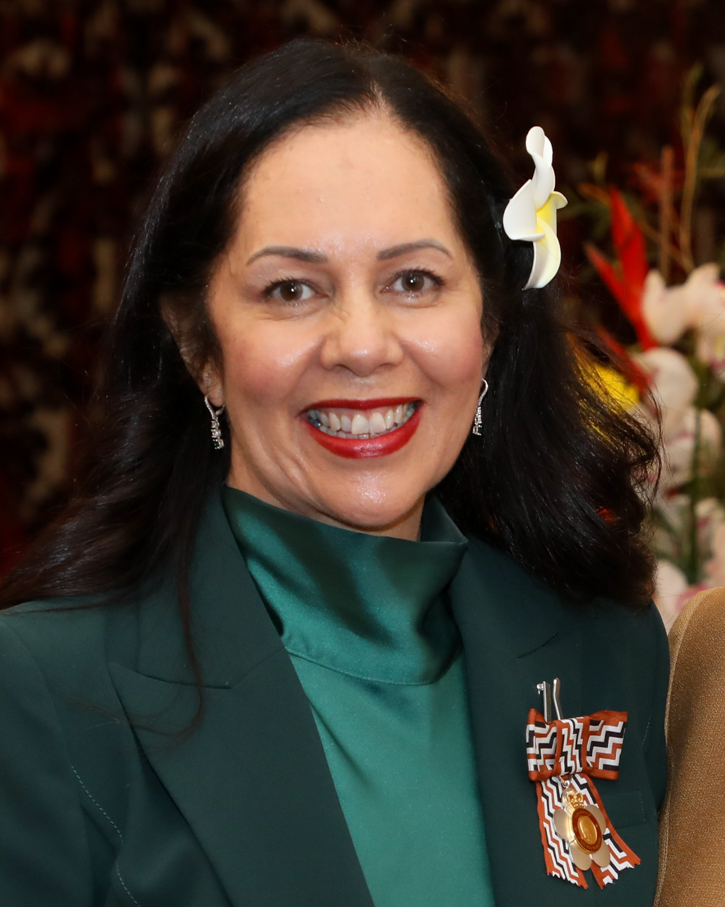
Frances Tagaloa

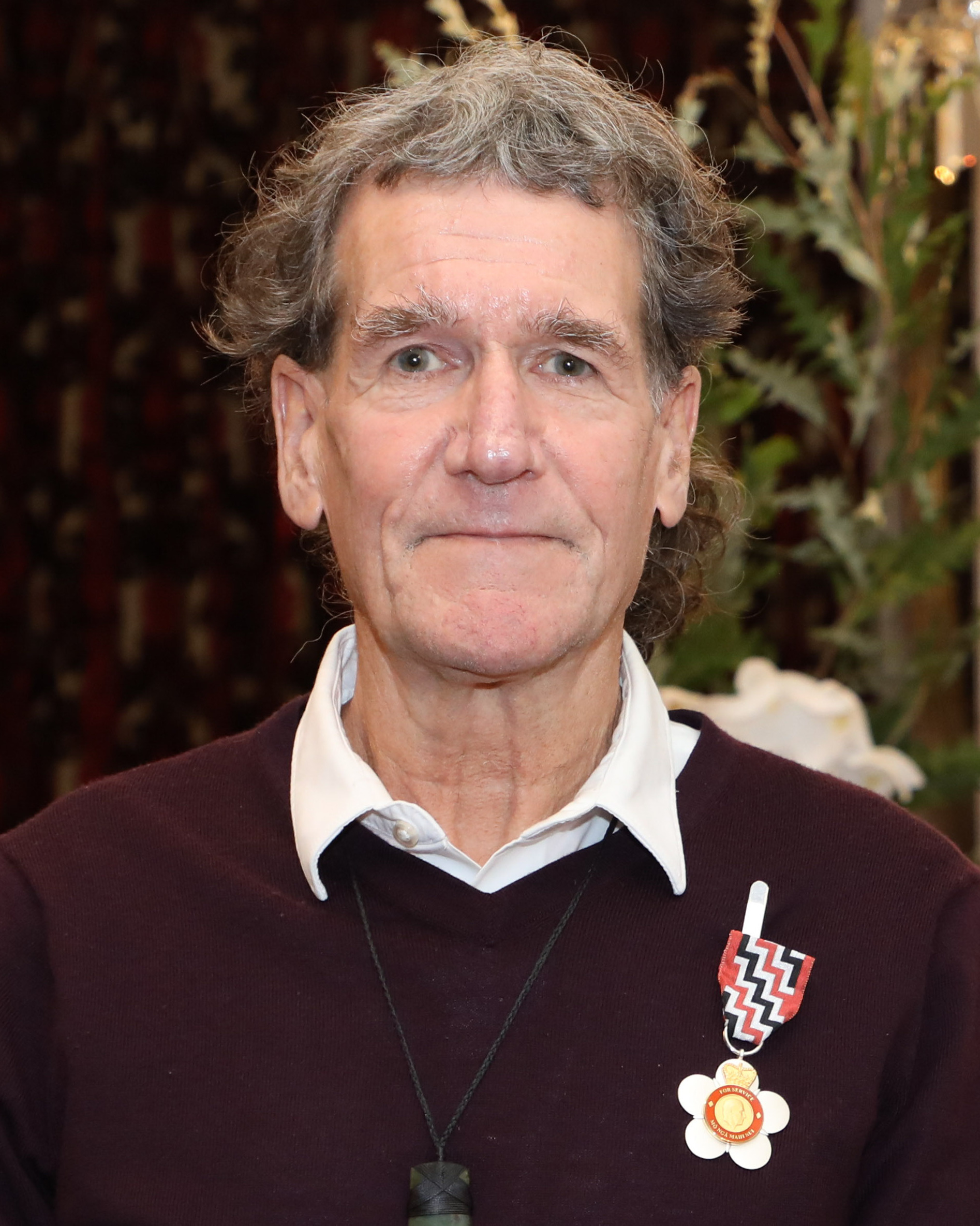
Keith Wiffin

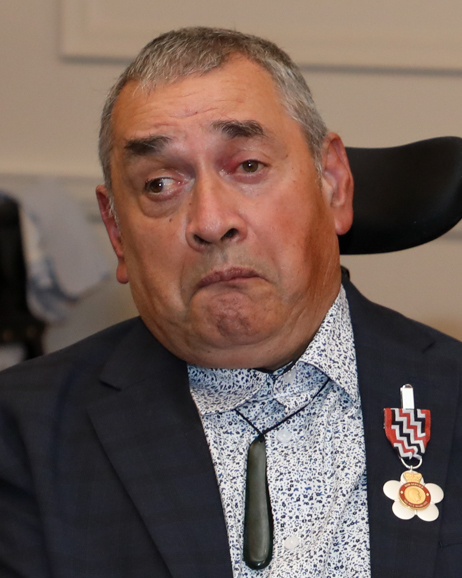
Gary Williams

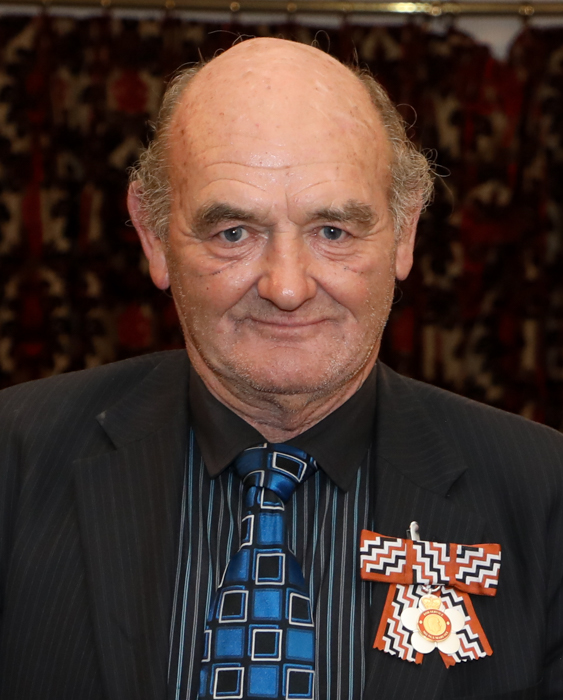
Paul Zentveld

== King's Service Medal (KSM) ==
- Alister David Argyle – of Ashburton. For services to the community.
- Victoria Elizabeth Barnard – of Whakatāne. For services to the RNZSPCA.
- Cynthia Jane Brooks – of Renwick. For services to local government and historical research.
- Michael Russell Buick – of Windsor. For services to the performing arts, particularly musical theatre.
- Colin Terence Campbell – of Rainbow Point. For services to horse racing and governance.
- Ian Peter (Harry) Carter – of Whangārei. For services to Fire and Emergency New Zealand and the community.
- Sergeant Leslie Edward Clarke – of Taihape. For services to the New Zealand Police and the community.
- Kathleen Patricia Coster – of Papanui. For services to survivors of abuse in care.
- Shannel Peter Courtney – of Tākaka. For services to conservation and choral music.
- Sandra Lois May Curd JP – of Ashburton. For services to the community.
- Sally Elizabeth Davies – of Te Awamutu. For services to hockey and nursing.
- Vaine Puapii Elia – of Ōtara. For services to the Cook Islands community.
- Rouruina Emile-Brown – of Kingsland. For services to the Cook Islands community.
- Patricia Mary Anne Eyles JP – of Taradale. For services to the community.
- Hans-Josef Erwin Freller – of Rolleston. For services to survivors of abuse in care.
- Neta Bernadette Gilbert (Neta Kerepeti) – of Whangārei. For services to survivors of abuse in care.
- Reverend Marie Eleanor Gilpin – of Papamoa Beach. For services to the community.
- Thomas Michael Gray – of Greytown. For services to local government and the community.
- Bryan Robert Guy – of Feilding. For services to the community.
- Peter Colin Hensman – of Havelock North. For services to cricket and the community.
- Toni Lee James Jarvis – of Glengarry. For services to survivors of abuse in care.
- Jeremy Wiremu Alexander Johnson – of Saint Marys Bay. For services to the Anglican Church and the LGBTQI+ community.
- Hans Allen Key – of Totara Heights. For services to health and safety and Pacific communities.
- Senior Constable Paul Hendrick Lampe – of New Plymouth. For services to youth.
- Michael Joseph Ledingham – of Te Puke. For services to survivors of abuse in care. (Note: Ledingham relinquished his award of the King's Service Medal in June 2025, and the King directed that the award be cancelled and annulled, and that Ledingham's name be erased from the Register of the King’s Service Order.)
- Peter Fala Aperila Leilua – of Mount Albert. For services to the community, particularly youth and Pacific peoples.
- Tiliilagi Leilua – of Mount Albert. For services to the community, particularly youth and Pacific peoples.
- Valerie Joan Lissette – of Fairfield. For services to dance.
- Moira Catherine Lockington – of Reefton. For services to the community.
- Pamela Anne Logan – of Springlands. For services to theatre.
- Patricia Annette Macaulay – of Mosgiel. For services to the community.
- Carolyn Mayes – of Orewa. For services to conservation.
- Ronald James Moles – of Matamata. For services to education and the community.
- Fiona Mary Murdoch – of Hillcrest. For services to dance.
- Delza Reay Neben – of Half Moon Bay. For services to print media and the community.
- John William Oliver – of Ōtāne. For services to Fire and Emergency New Zealand and the community.
- Jyoti Parashar JP – of Blockhouse Bay. For services to the community.
- Graeme Victor Pearce – of Thames. For services to heritage preservation and the community.
- Marie Teresa Pearce – of Inglewood. For services to the community and local government.
- Neville Gordon Phillips – of Mataura. For services to Fire and Emergency New Zealand and ice sports.
- Peter Herehere Priest – of Whangamatā. For services to Māori and conservation.
- Susan Lyall Priest – of Whangamatā. For services to Māori and conservation.
- David John Ramsay – of Bridge Hill, Alexandra. For services to the community.
- Rangimahora Mokomoko Reddy – of Hillcrest. For services to Māori health.
- David Malcolm James Richmond – of St Clair. For services to sport, particularly athletics and cricket.
- Eugene Shane Te Awamate Ryder – of Khandallah. For services to survivors of abuse in care.
- Barbara Anne Simpson – of Kawarau Falls, Queenstown. For services to conservation and the community.
- Anne Acton Sinclair – of Massey. For services to the community.
- Darryl William Smith – of Rangiora. For services to survivors of abuse in care.
- Richard Antony Dougal Steele JP – of Ōwhango. For services to the rural community.
- Peter David Swain – of Appleby. For services to the community.
- Teremoana Terepai – of Glen Innes. For services to the Pacific community and seniors.
- Margaret Ann Vickers – of Fitzroy. For services to the community.
- Grahame Roy Perry Webber – of Cambridge. For services to local government and farming governance.
- Phyllis Rosemary Weir – of Papatoetoe. For services to cricket and horticulture.
- Craig John Wells – of Te Kamo. For services to business and the community.
- Jennifer Gai Wotten – of Te Puke. For services to the community and squash.
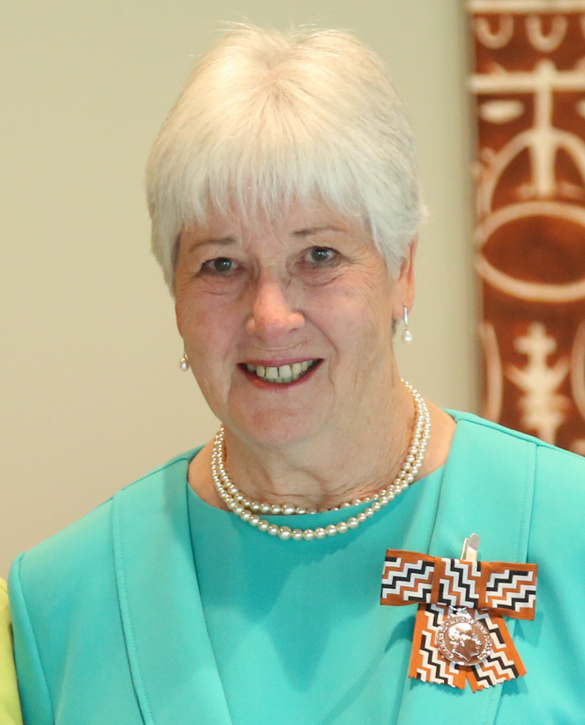
Vicki Barnard

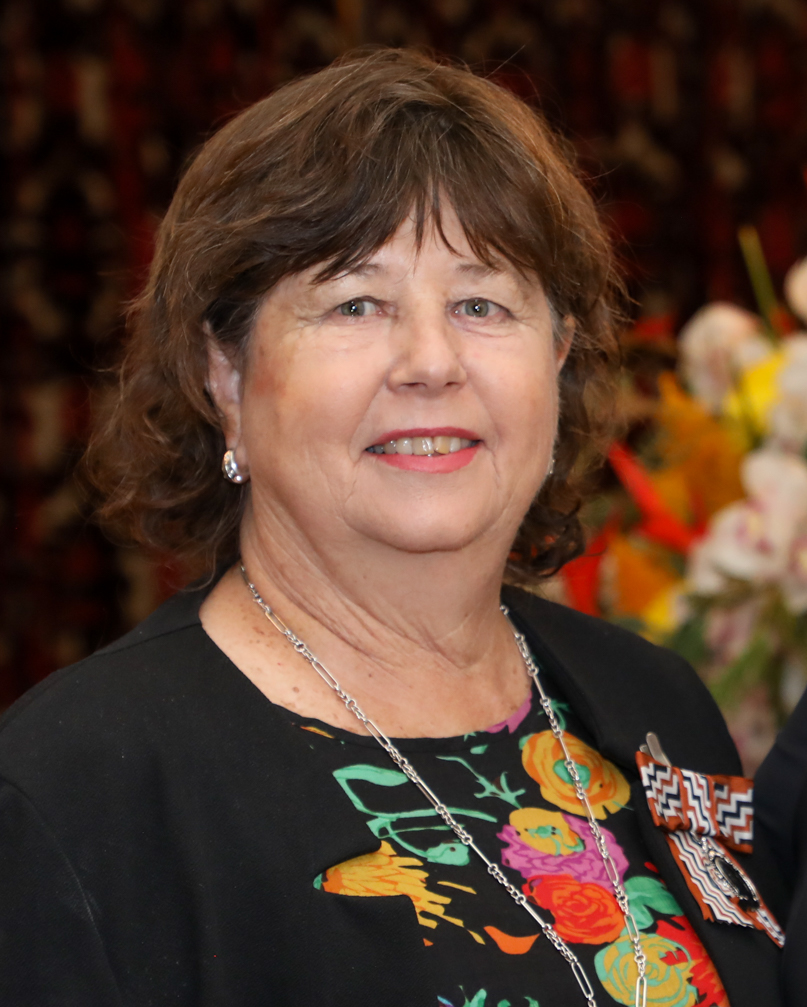
Cynthia Brooks

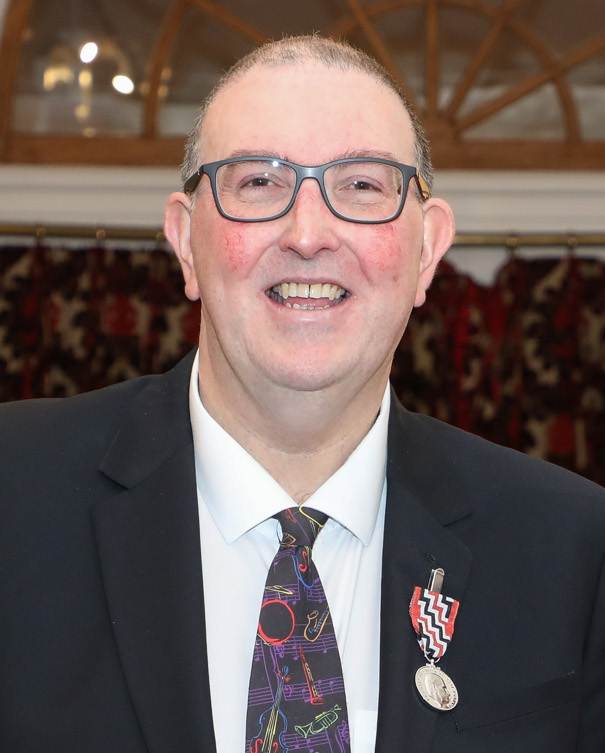
Michael Buick

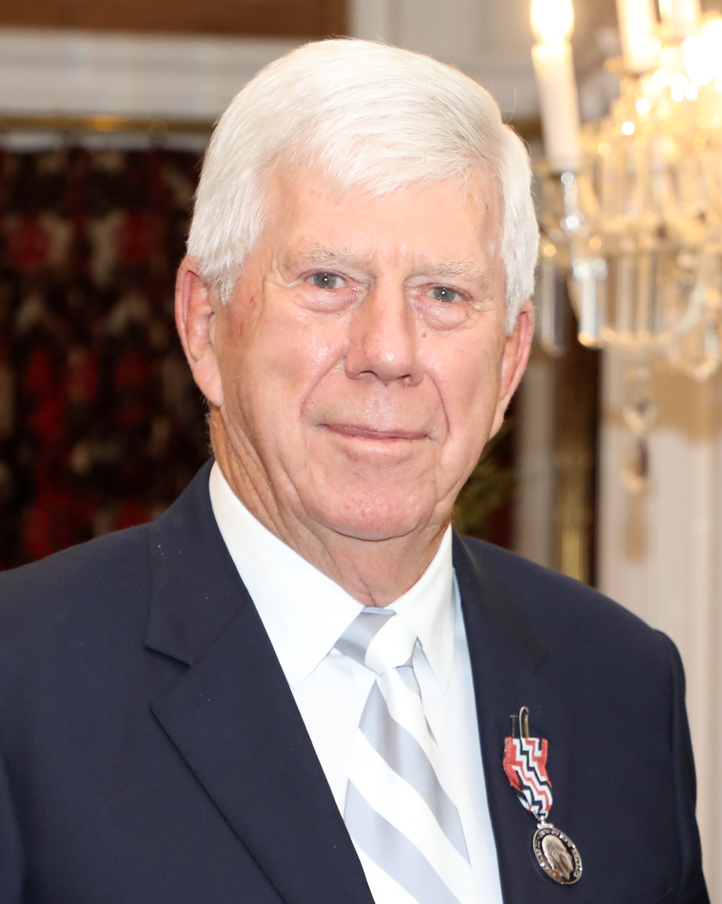
Terry Campbell

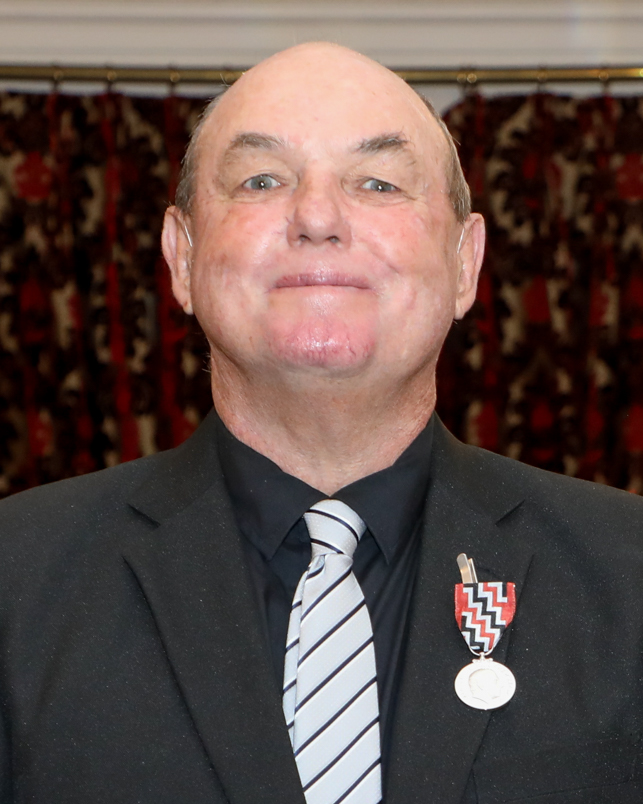
Harry Carter

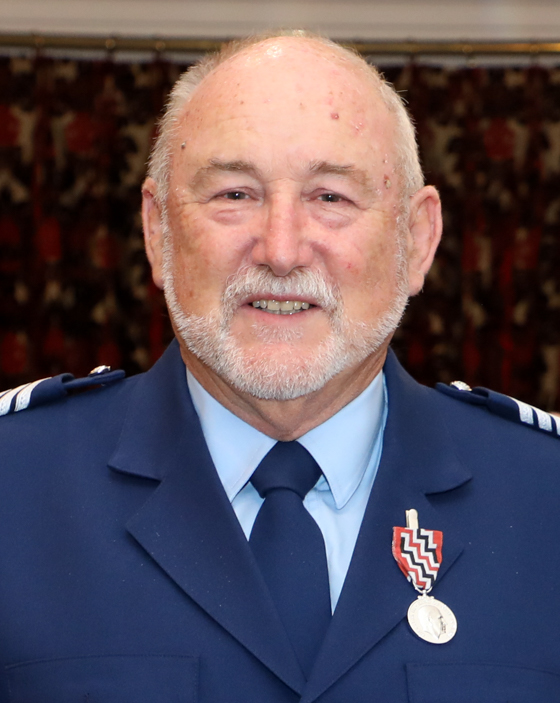
Les Clarke

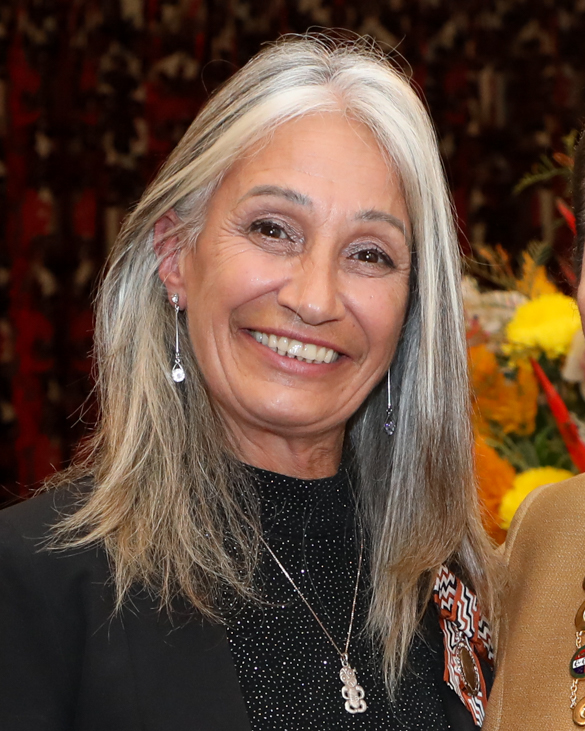
Kath Coster

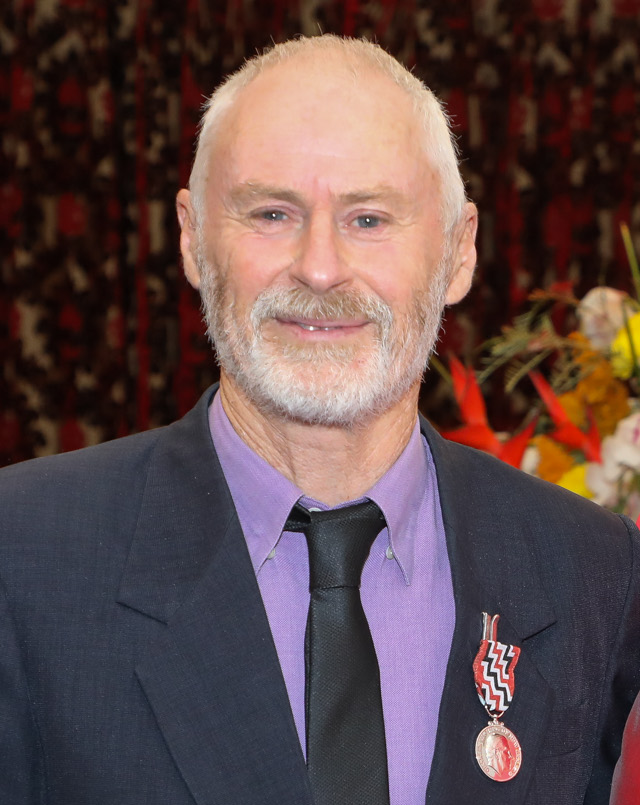
Shannel Courtney

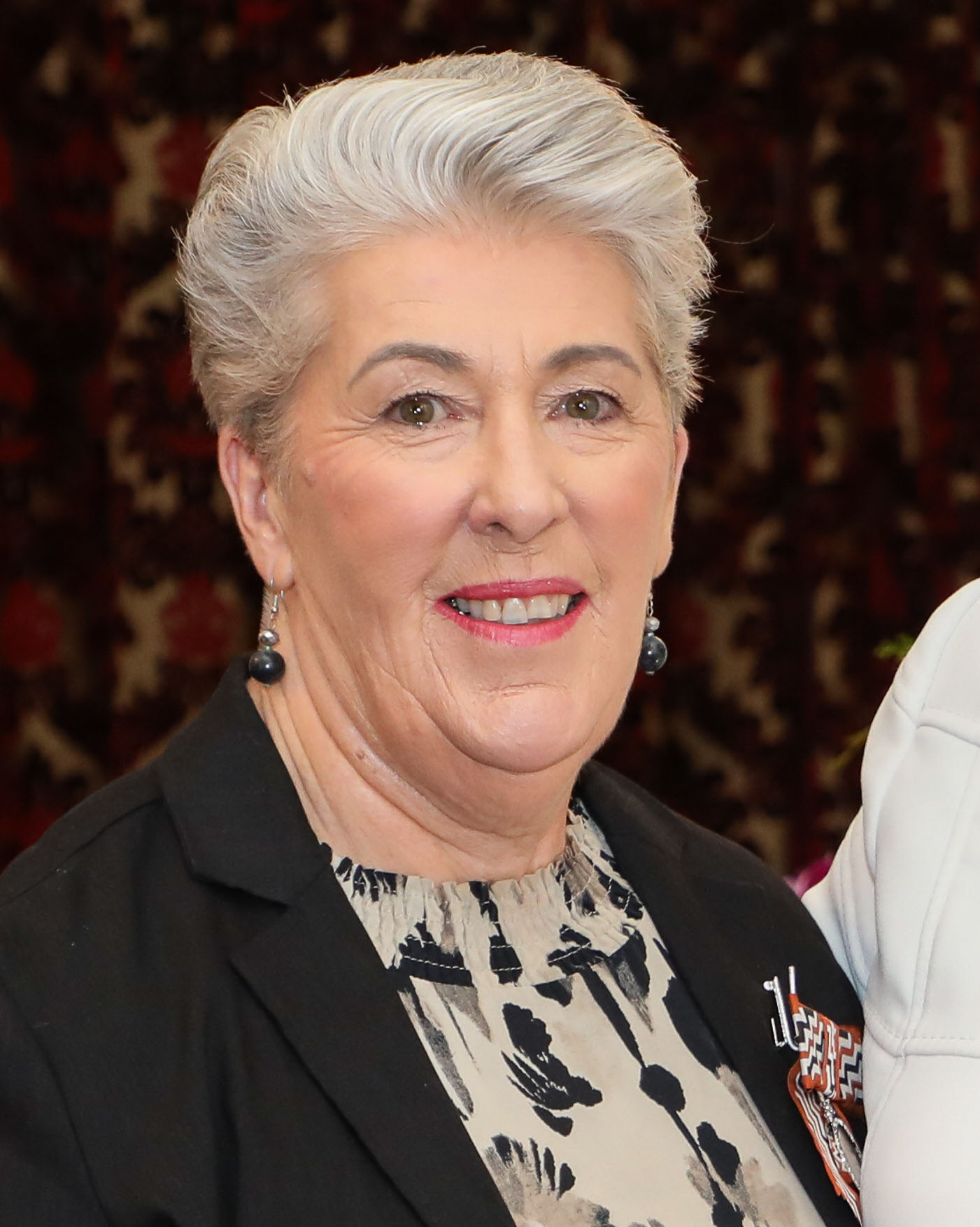
Sandra Curd

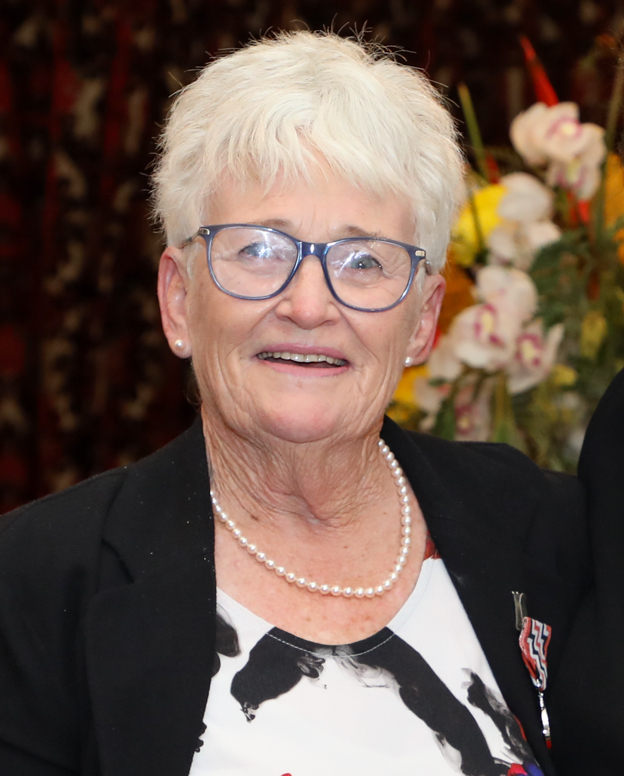
Sally Davies

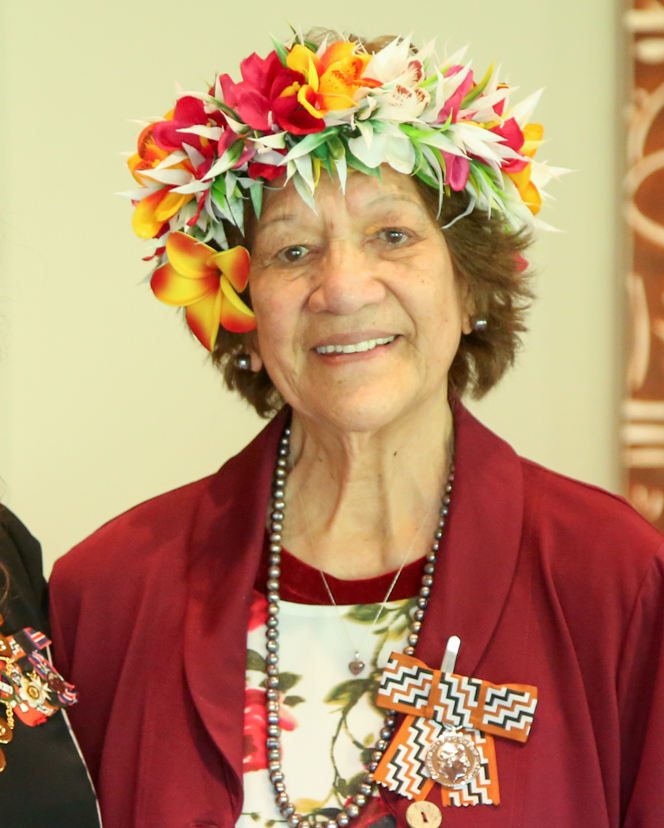
Vaine Elia

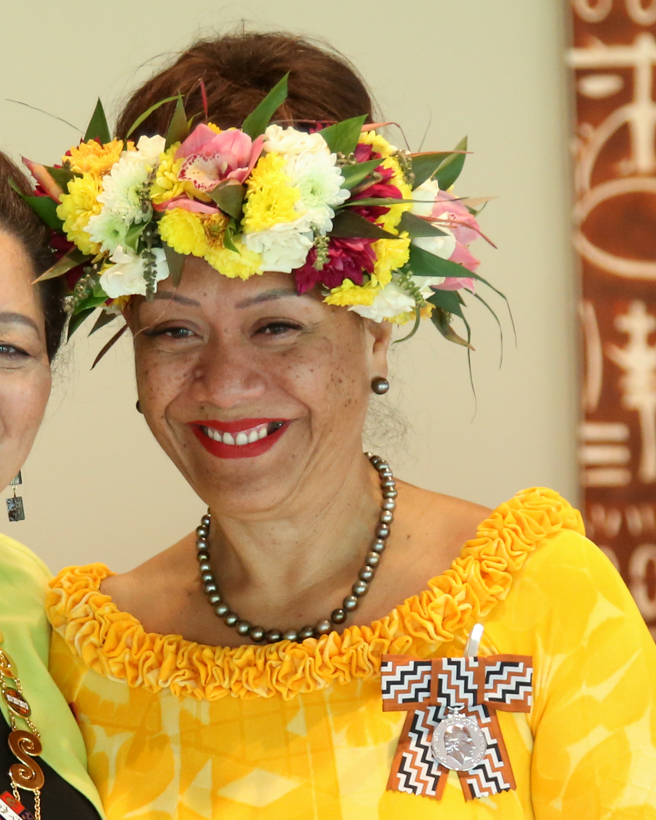
Rouruina Emile‑Brown

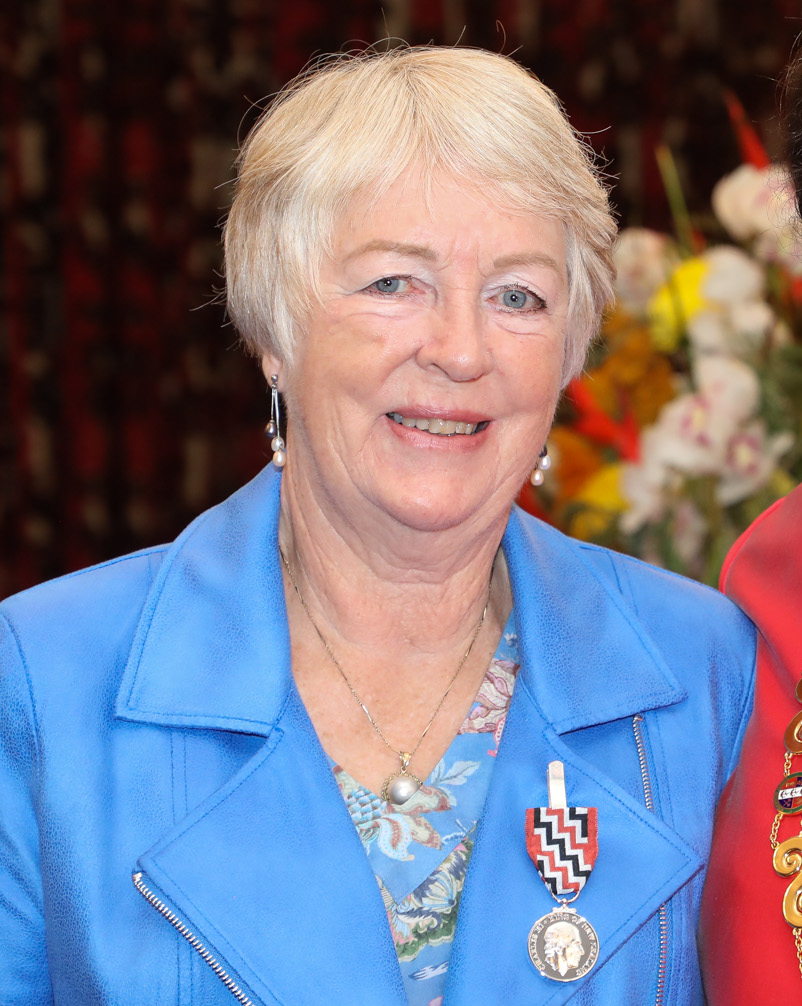
Mary Anne Eyles

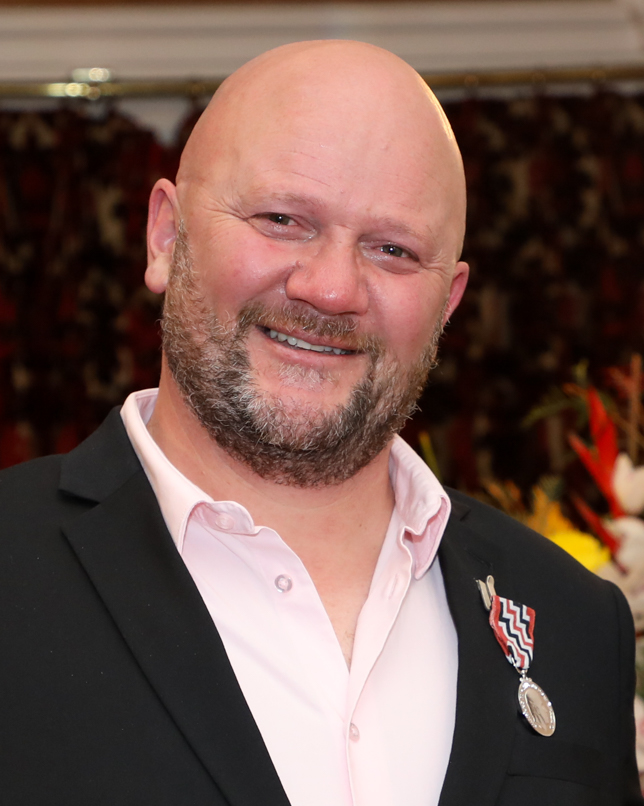
Hanz Freller

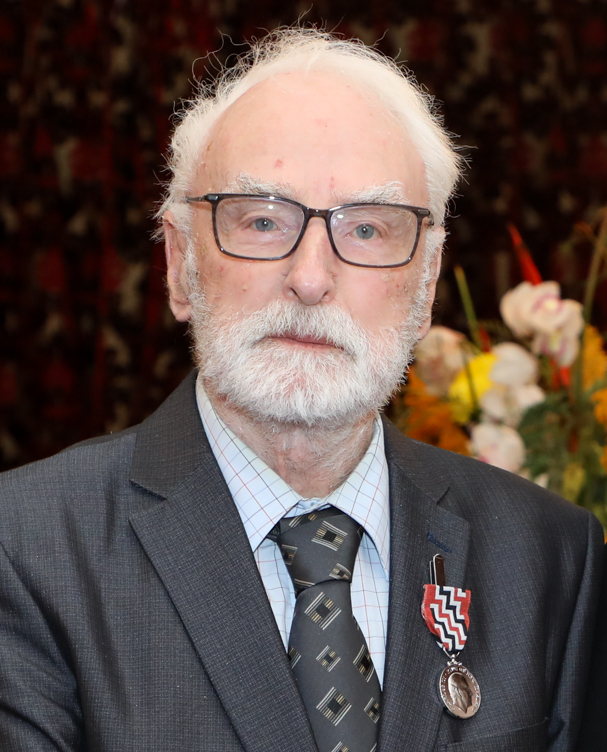
Mike Gray

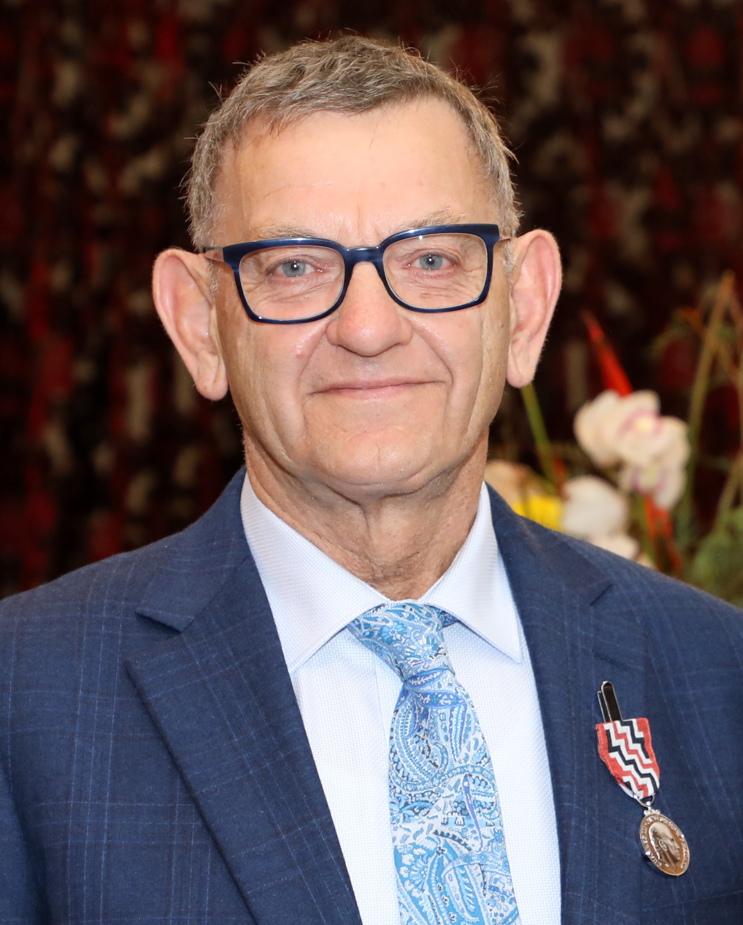
Bryan Guy

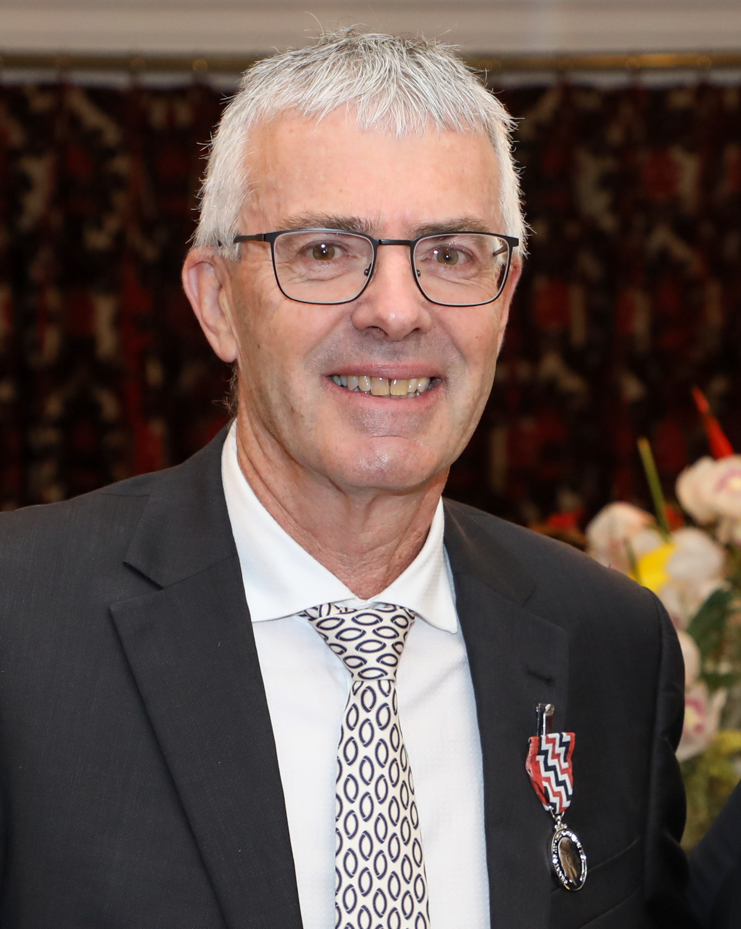
Peter Hensman

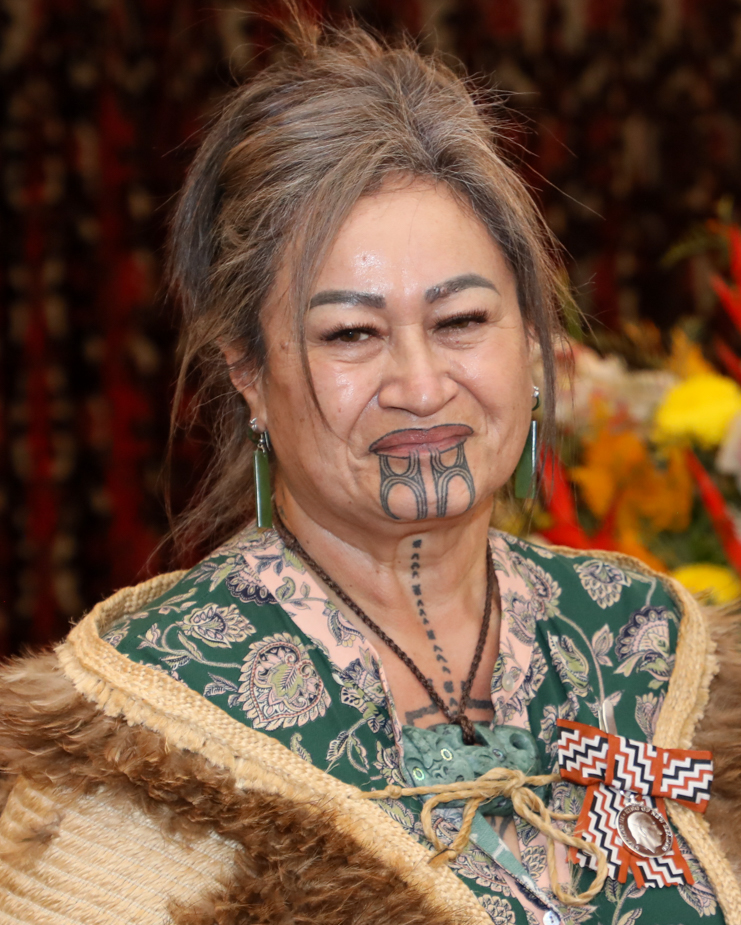
Neta Kerepeti

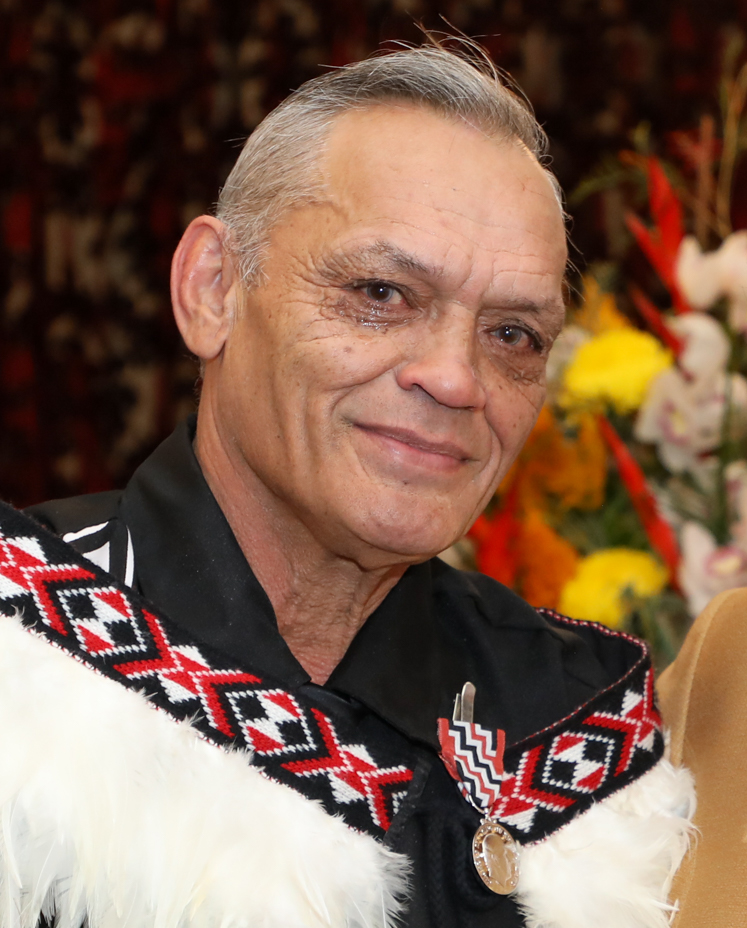
Toni Jarvis

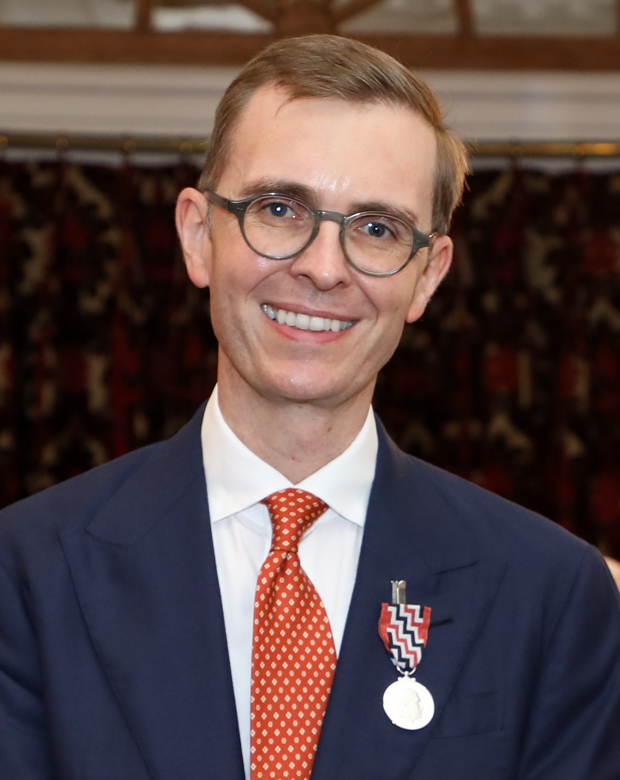
Jeremy Johnson

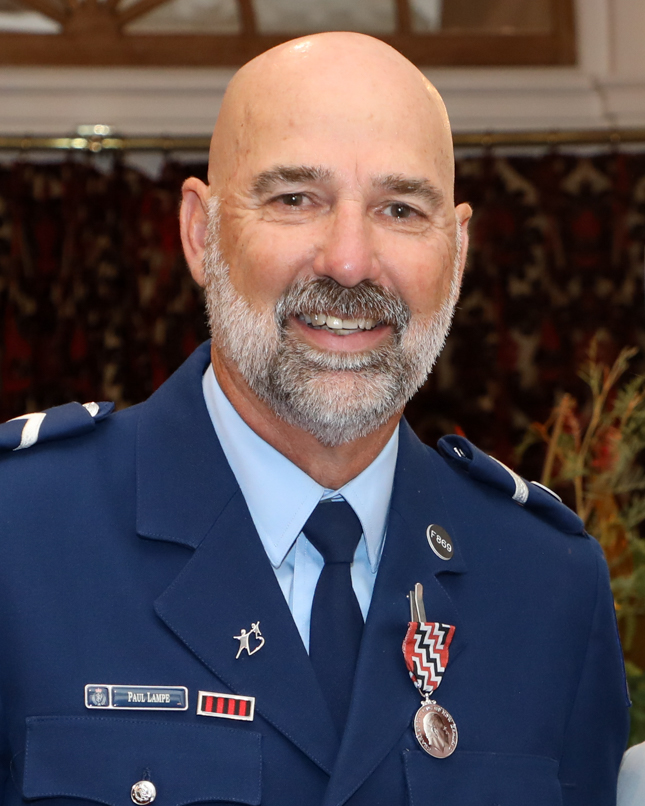
Paul Lampe

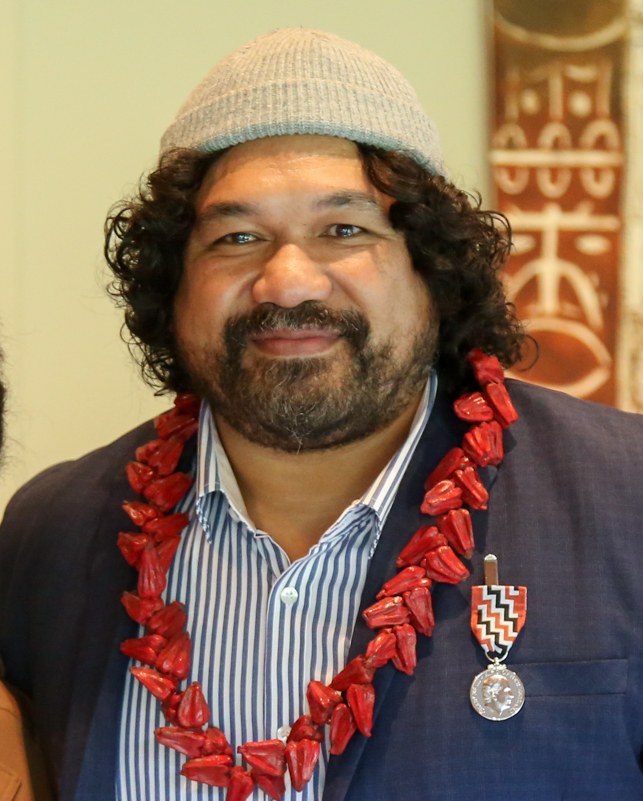
Peter Leilua

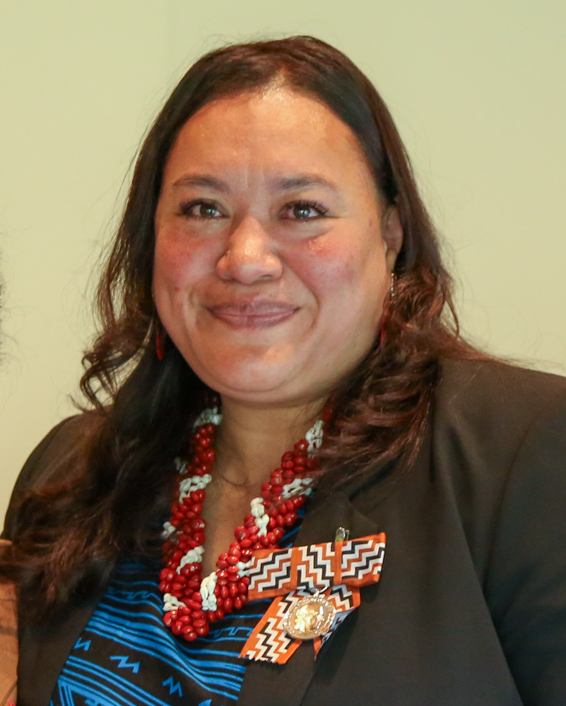
Tili Leilua

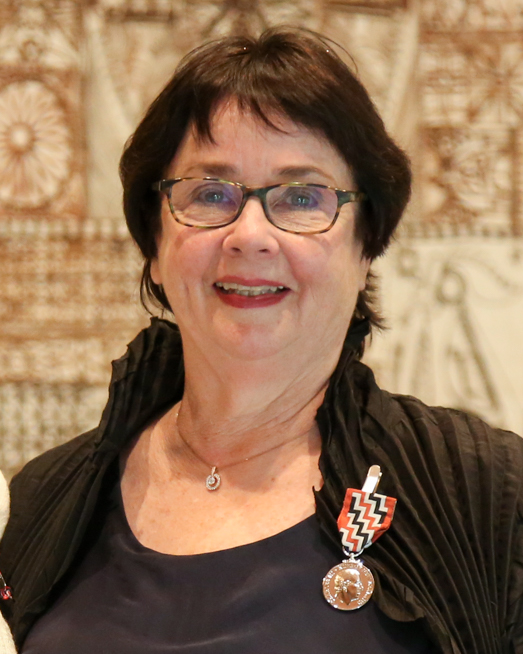
Valerie Lissette

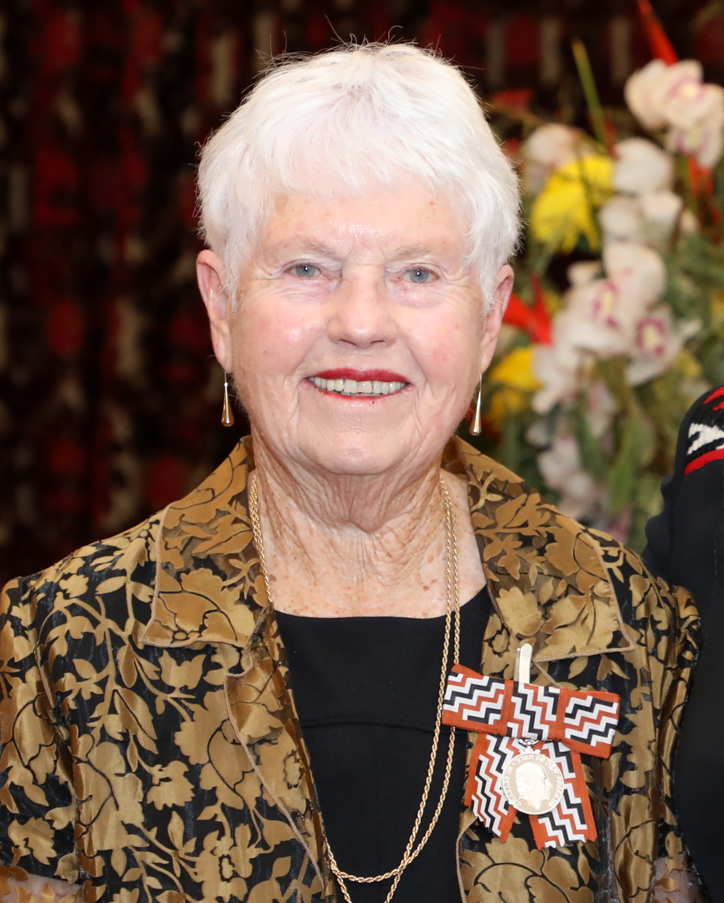
Moira Lockington

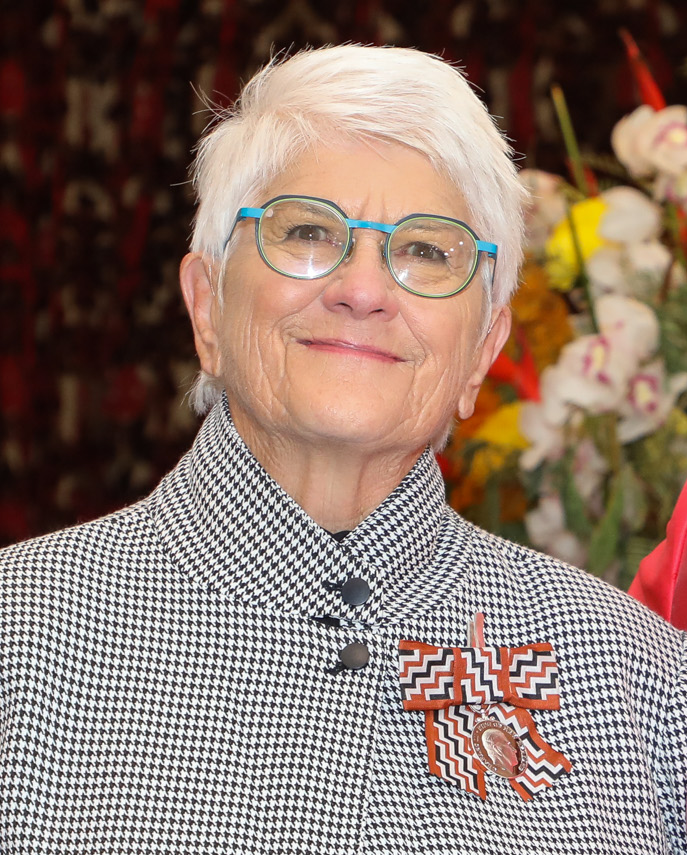
Pam Logan

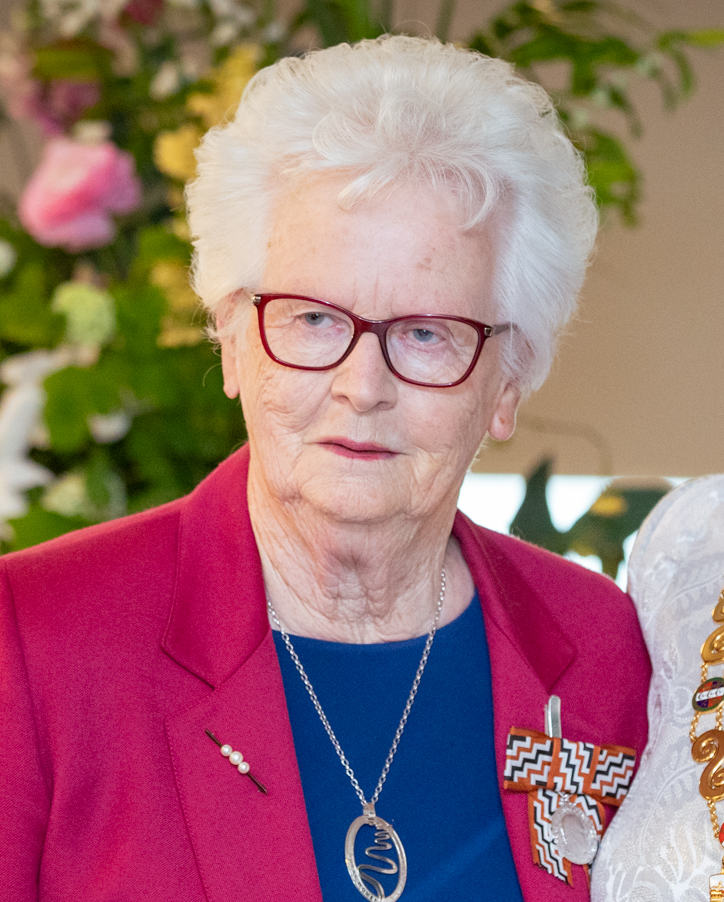
Patricia Macaulay

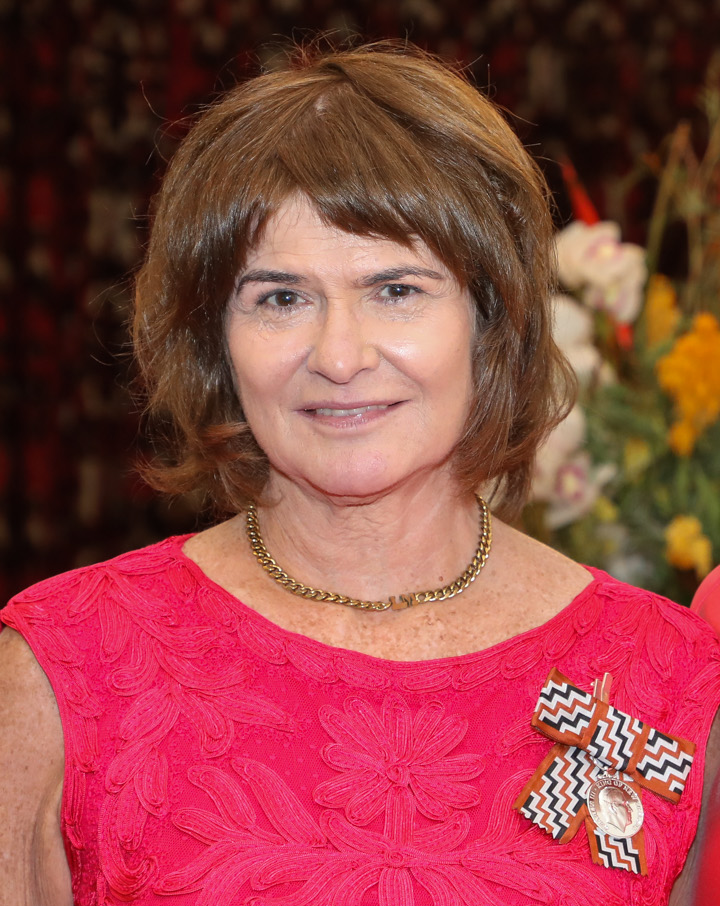
Lyn Mayes

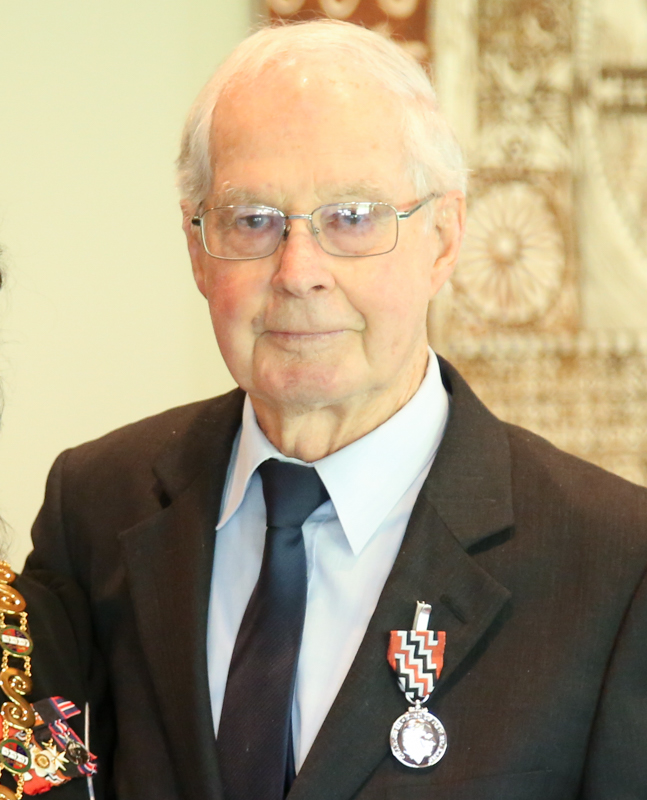
Ron Moles

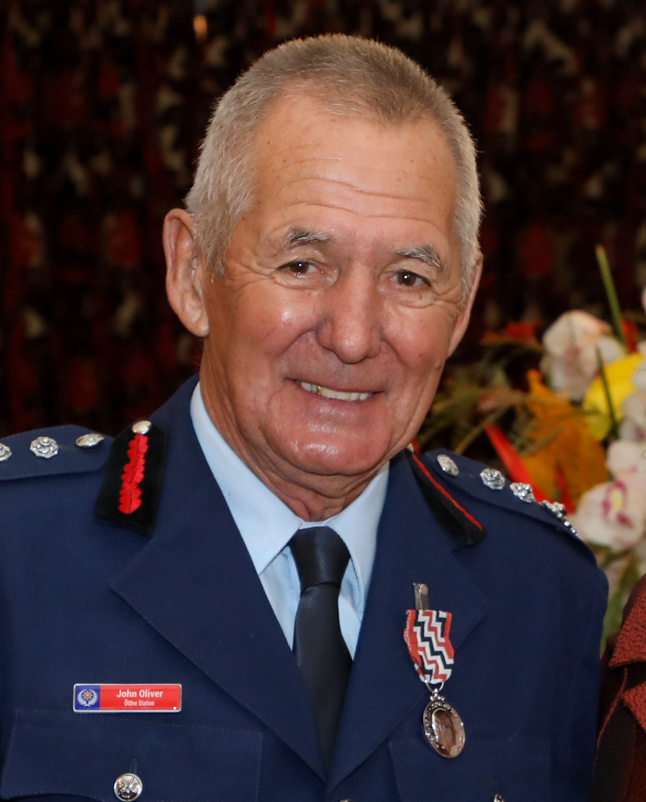
John Oliver

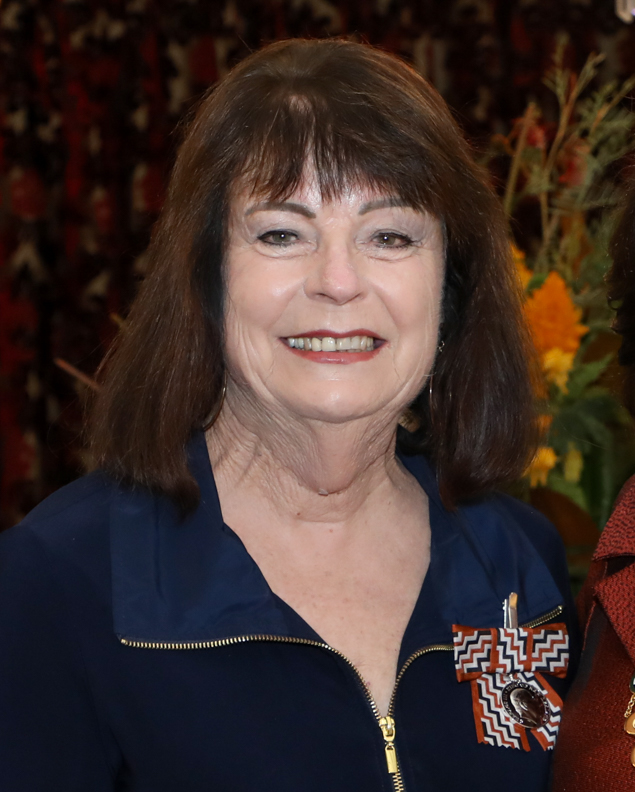
Marie Pearce

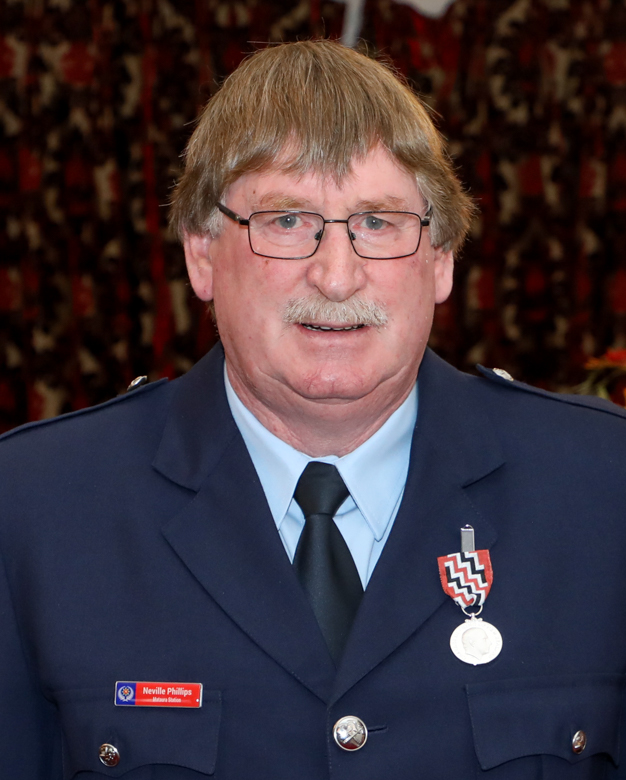
Neville Phillips

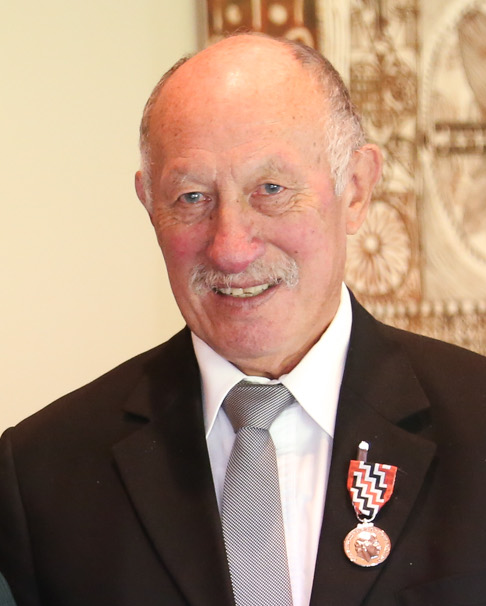
Peter Priest

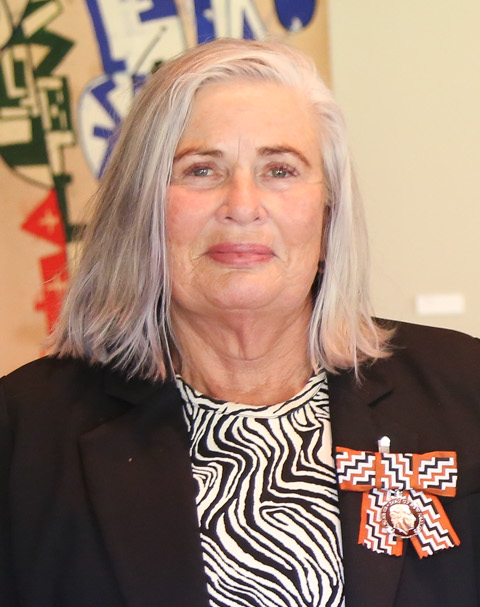
Sue Priest

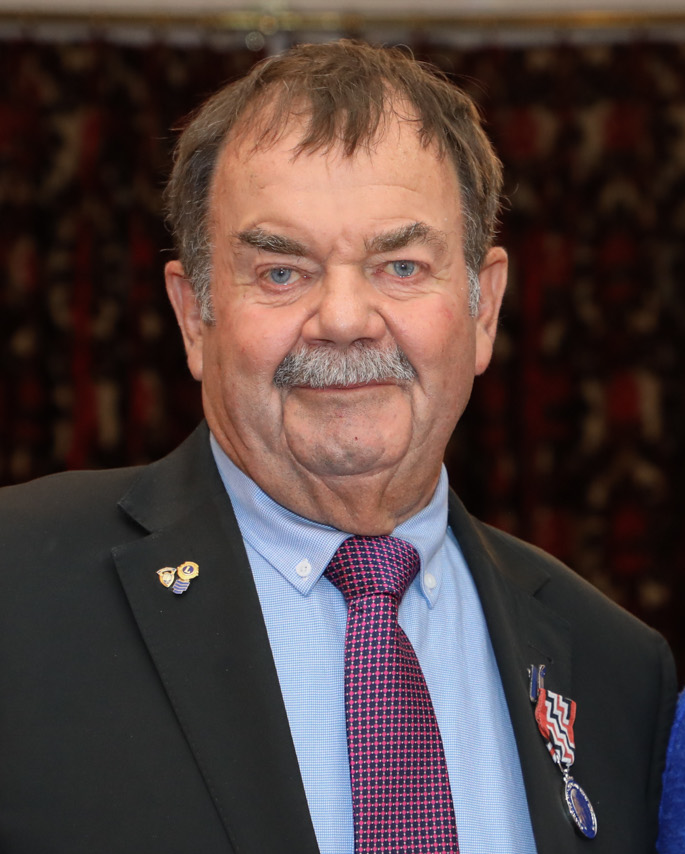
David Ramsay

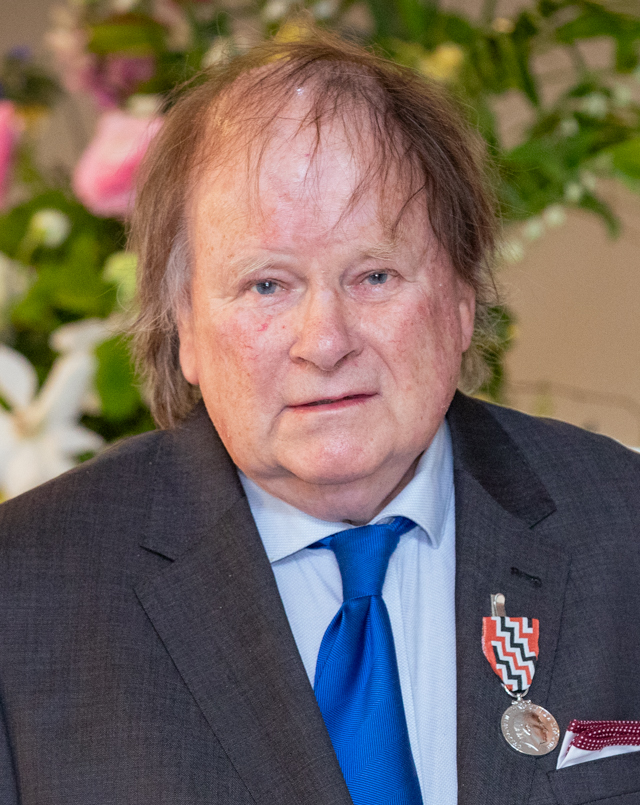
David Richmond

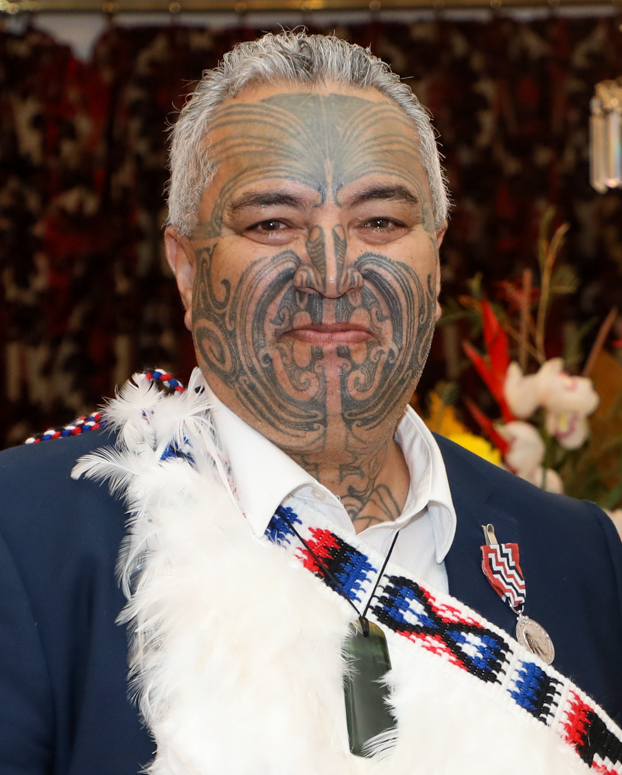
Eugene Ryder

Barb Simpson

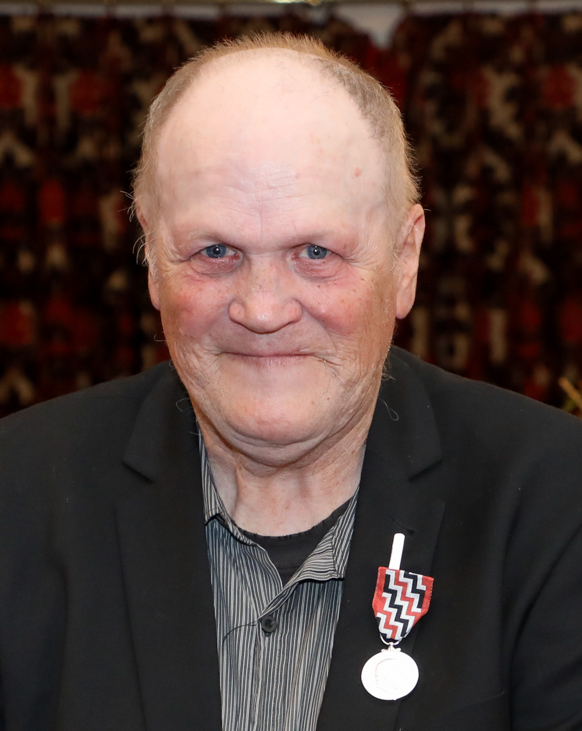
Darryl Smith

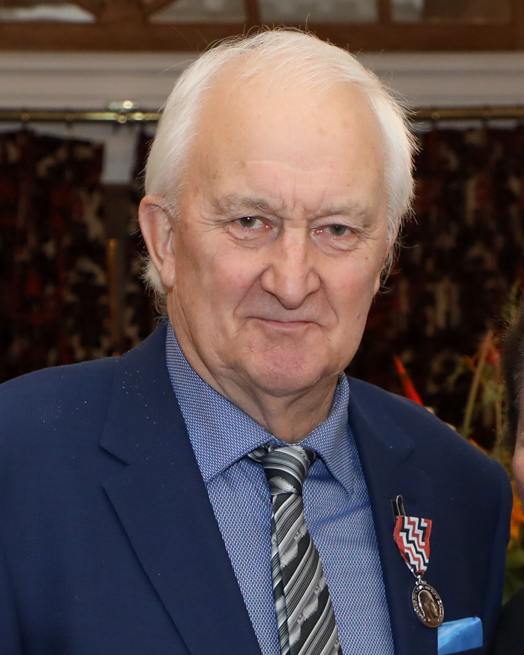
Richard Steele

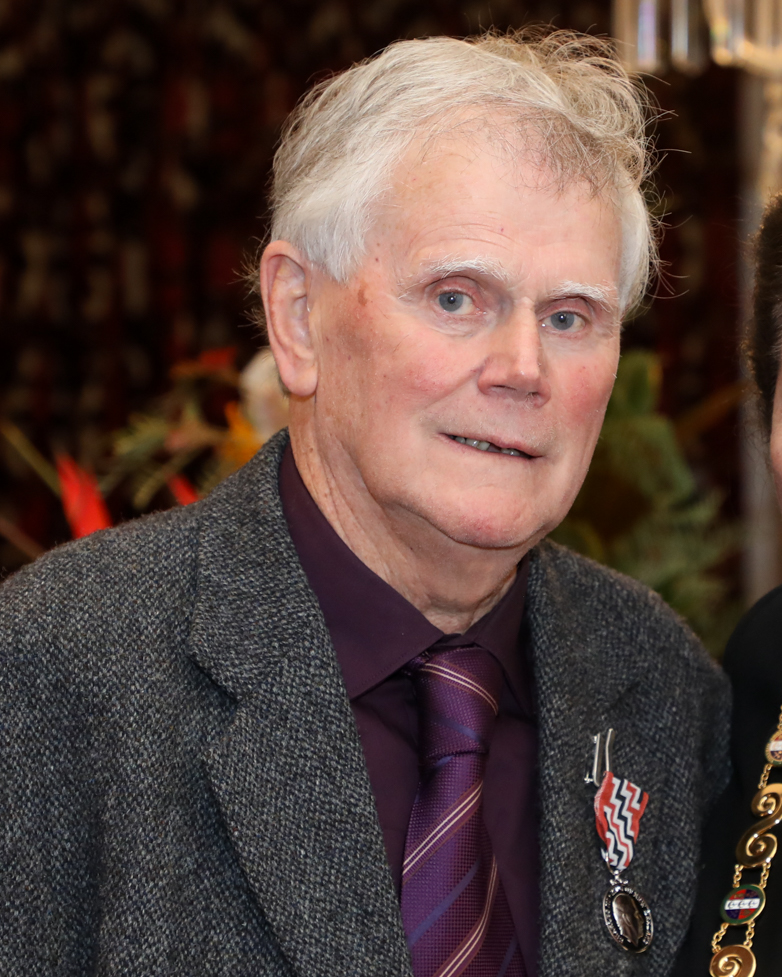
Peter Swain

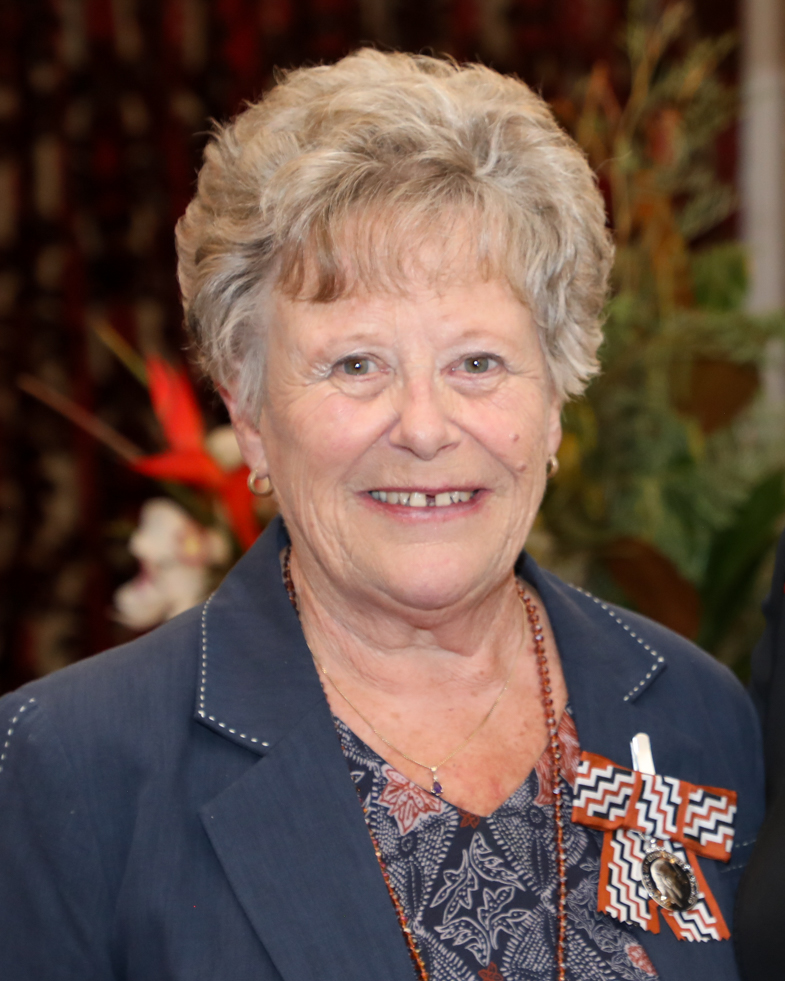
Margaret Vickers

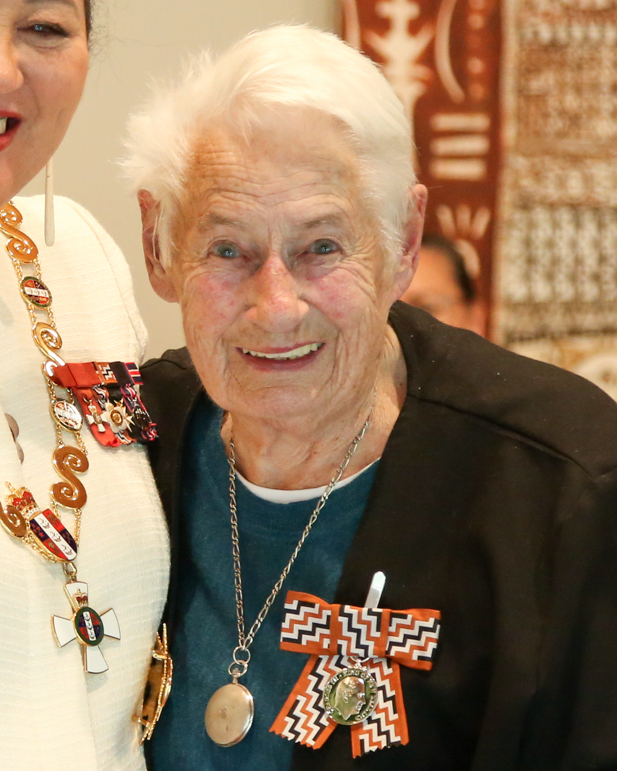
Rose Weir

== New Zealand Antarctic Medal (NZAM) ==
- Alastair Robin Fastier – of Glenorchy. For services to Antarctic heritage conservation.
- Colin Chalmers Monteath QSM – of Cashmere. For services to Antarctic field support, archival preservation, literature and photography.
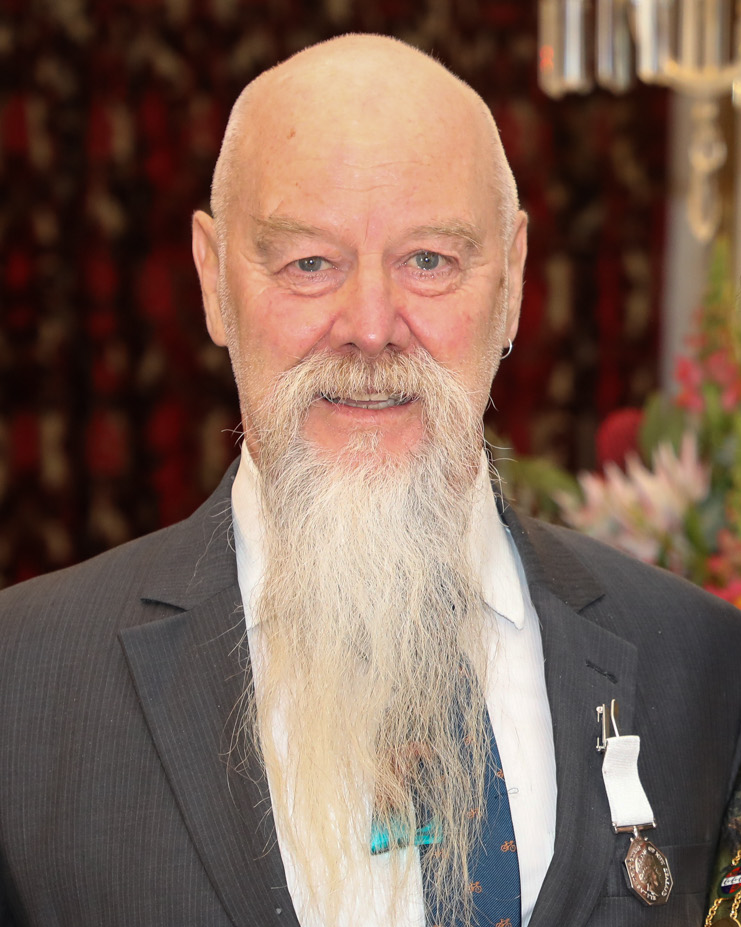
Al Fastier

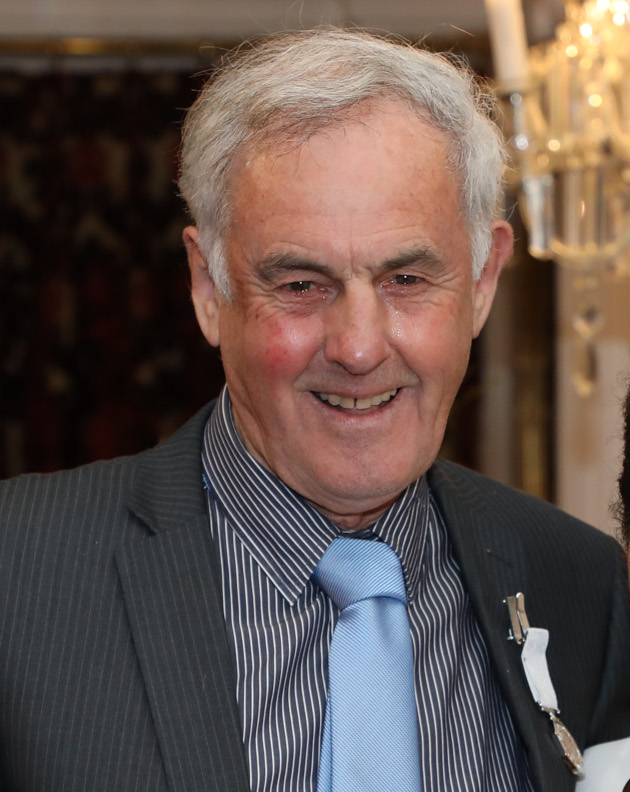
Colin Monteath

== New Zealand Distinguished Service Decoration (DSD) ==
- Squadron Leader Paul Leslie Stockley – of Palmerston North. For services to the New Zealand Defence Force.
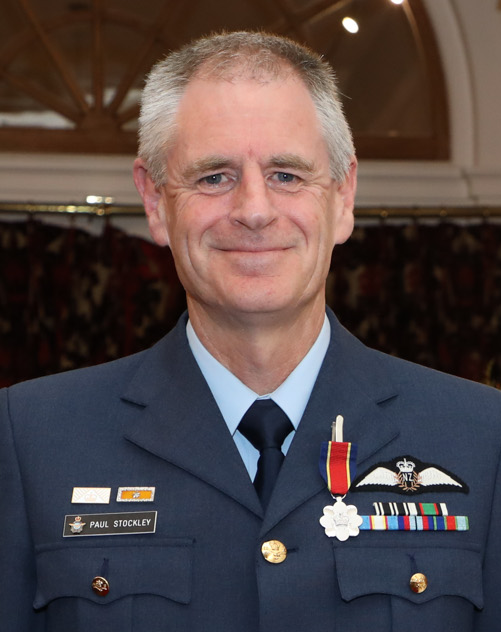
Paul Stockley
