= List of honorary doctors of Auckland University of Technology =

The list of honorary doctors of Auckland University of Technology below shows the recipients of honorary doctorates (HonD) bestowed by Auckland University of Technology (AUT) since it was granted university status in 2000.

| Year | Recipient |
|---|---|
| 2000 | Peter Blake |
| 2002 | Stephen Tindall |
| 2003 | Rongo Wetere |
| 2003 | Kenji Tanaka |
| 2003 | Garry Tee |
| 2004 | Mike Moore |
| 2004 | Grant Major |
| 2006 | John Hinchcliff |
| 2006 | Graeme Avery |
| 2007 | Jim Allen |
| 2008 | Takutai Wikiriwhi |
| 2008 | Arnold Wilson |
| 2010 | Don McKinnon |
| 2013 | Yingluck Shinawatra |
| 2013 | Pauline Kingi |
| 2013 | Ron Carter |
| 2013 | Stephen Jennings |
| 2016 | Adrienne Winkelmann |
| 2018 | Richard Harris |
| 2018 | James Wallace |
| 2019 | Max Gimblett |
| 2019 | Don McGlashan |
| 2021 | Naida Glavish |
| 2021 | Pouroto Ngaropo |
