= 1996 Birthday Honours (New Zealand) =

Awards list for New Zealand

1996 Queen's Birthday Honours
- Previous: 1996 Special Honours; Next: 1996 Special Honours
- Type: New Zealand royal honours: New Zealand Order of Merit; Queen's Service Order; Queen's Service Medal
- Date: 3 June 1996
- Country: New Zealand

Highlights
- Total recipients: 151

The 1996 Queen's Birthday Honours in New Zealand, celebrating the official birthday of Queen Elizabeth II, were appointments made by the Queen in her right as Queen of New Zealand, on the advice of the New Zealand government, to various orders and honours to reward and highlight good works by New Zealanders. They were announced on 3 June 1996.

The recipients of honours are listed here as they were styled before their new honour.

== New Zealand Order of Merit ==
=== Knight Grand Companion (GNZM) ===
Additional

- The Right Honourable Sir Michael Hardie Boys GCMG – Governor-General of New Zealand and chancellor of the New Zealand Order of Merit.
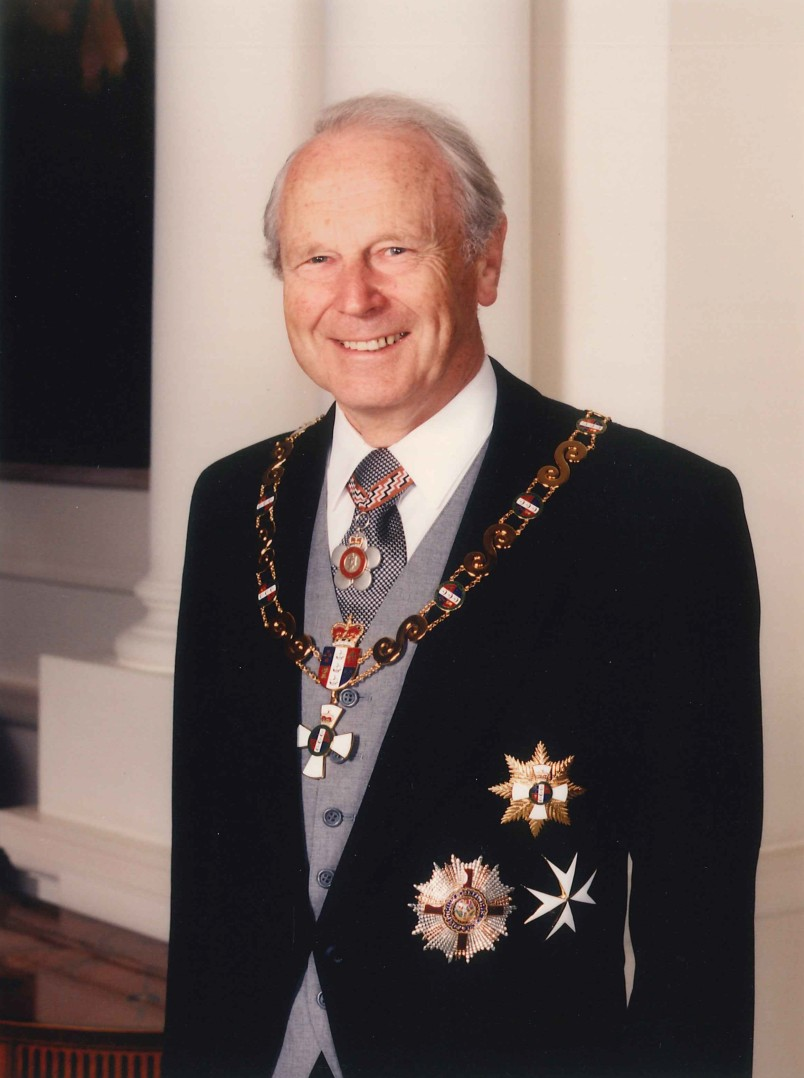
Sir Michael Hardie Boys

=== Dame Companion (DNZM) ===
- Catherine (Kate) Winifred Harcourt JP – of Wellington. For services to the theatre.
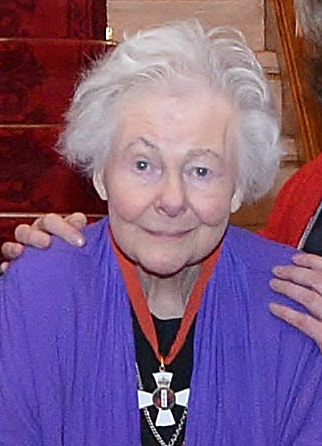
Dame Kate Harcourt

=== Knight Companion (KNZM) ===
- Robert Te Kotahi Mahuta – of Huntly. For services to the Māori people.

=== Companion (CNZM) ===
- Ian Charles Athfield – of Wellington. For services to architecture.
- Professor Philippa Margaret Black – of Auckland. For services to science.
- Michael John Albert Brown – of Auckland. For services to the Youth Court, education, and the community.
- Reginald Graham Calvert JP – of Pukekohe. For services to the dairy industry.
- Eion Sinclair Edgar – of Dunedin. For services to business management and the community.
- Janet May Hesketh QSM – of Wellington. For services to the National Council of Women.
- Anne Kathryn Knowles – of Wellington. For services to women and the community.
- Commodore John Gordon Leonard ADC – Royal New Zealand Navy.
- Richard Norman MacDonald – of Wellington; Commissioner of Police, New Zealand Police.
- Peter Donald McKenzie – of Tawa. For services to the law.
- Professor Bryan William Manktelow – of Palmerston North. For services to veterinary science.
- Dr James Ng MBE – of Dunedin. For services to historical research and the community.
- Judith Catherine Trotter – of Rome, Italy. For services to diplomacy.
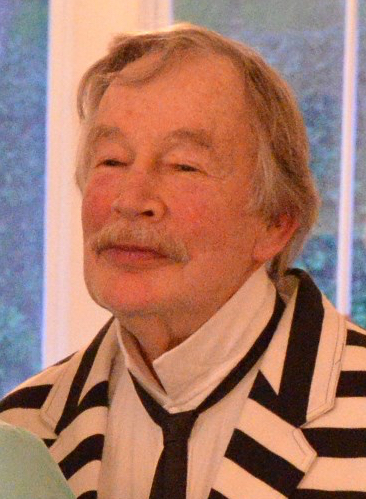
Ian Athfield

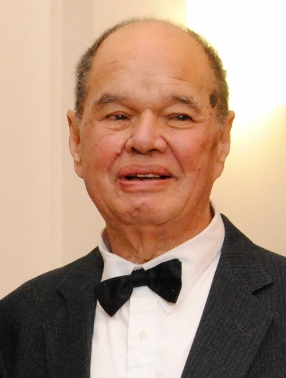
Mick Brown

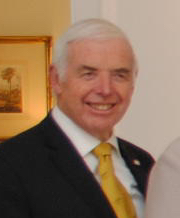
Eion Edgar

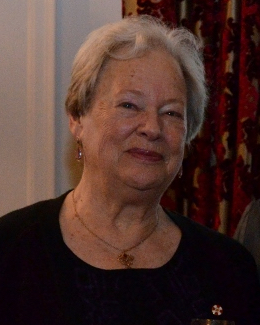
Janet Hesketh

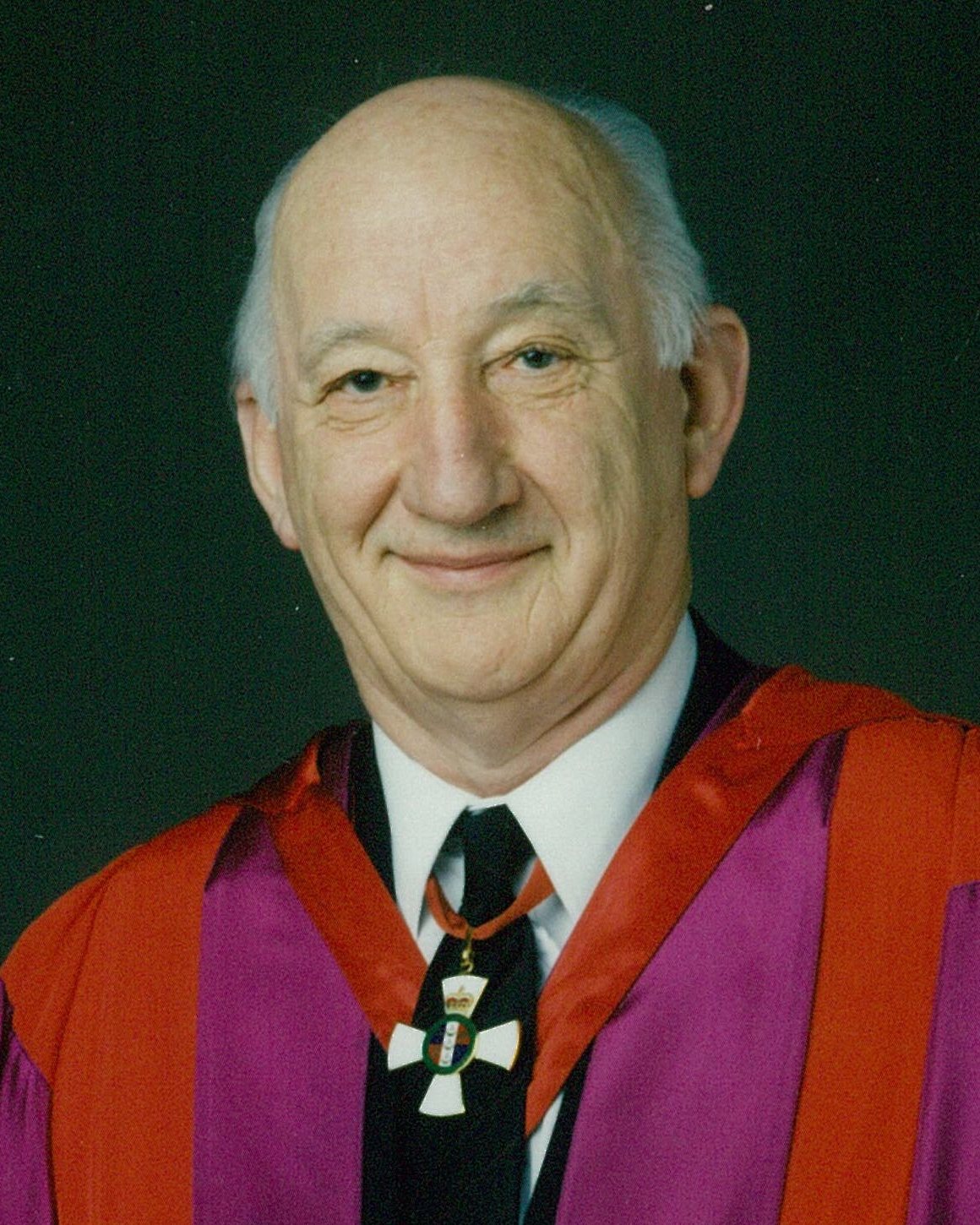
Bill Manktelow

=== Officer (ONZM) ===
- Jane Mary (Molly) Atkinson – of Palmerston North. For services to music.
- Margaret (Maggie) Mary Barry – of Masterton. For services to broadcasting.
- Denis Fergus Black – of Auckland. For services to surf lifesaving and the community.
- Gary Michiel Daverne – of Auckland. For services to music.
- Dr Janet Marjorie Davidson – of Wellington. For services to archaeology.
- Dr Hugh Patrick Dunn – of Auckland. For services to medicine and the community.
- William Harold Eaddy – of Mount Maunganui. For services to rowing.
- Leslie Jean Egnot – of Auckland. For services to yachting.
- Lachlan Ross Griffen – of Lyttelton. For services to the road transport industry and the community.
- Mary Ellen Hartstonge (Sister Mary Lucia) – of Dunedin. For services to health administration.
- Wing Commander Craig Owen Inch – Royal New Zealand Air Force.
- Dr Manying Bess Ip – of Auckland. For services to the Chinese community.
- Dr Thomas Brent Layton – of Christchurch. For services to business management.
- Peter Sidney Plummer JP – of Waipawa. For services to farming and the community.
- Dr Ian Ambury Miller Prior – of Wellington. For services to medicine and environmental issues.
- Lieutenant Colonel Neville John Reilly – Royal New Zealand Armoured Corps.
- John Hamish Roake JP – of Tauranga. For services to gliding.
- Walter Charles Scott JP – of Morrinsville. For services to the community.
- Commander Jack Raymond Steer – Royal New Zealand Navy.
- Margaret Ann McGregor Vennell – of Auckland. For services to the community.
- Rongo Herehere Wetere – of Te Awamutu. For services to the community.
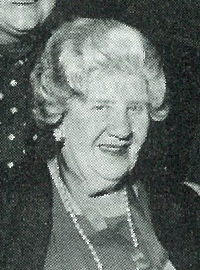
Molly Atkinson

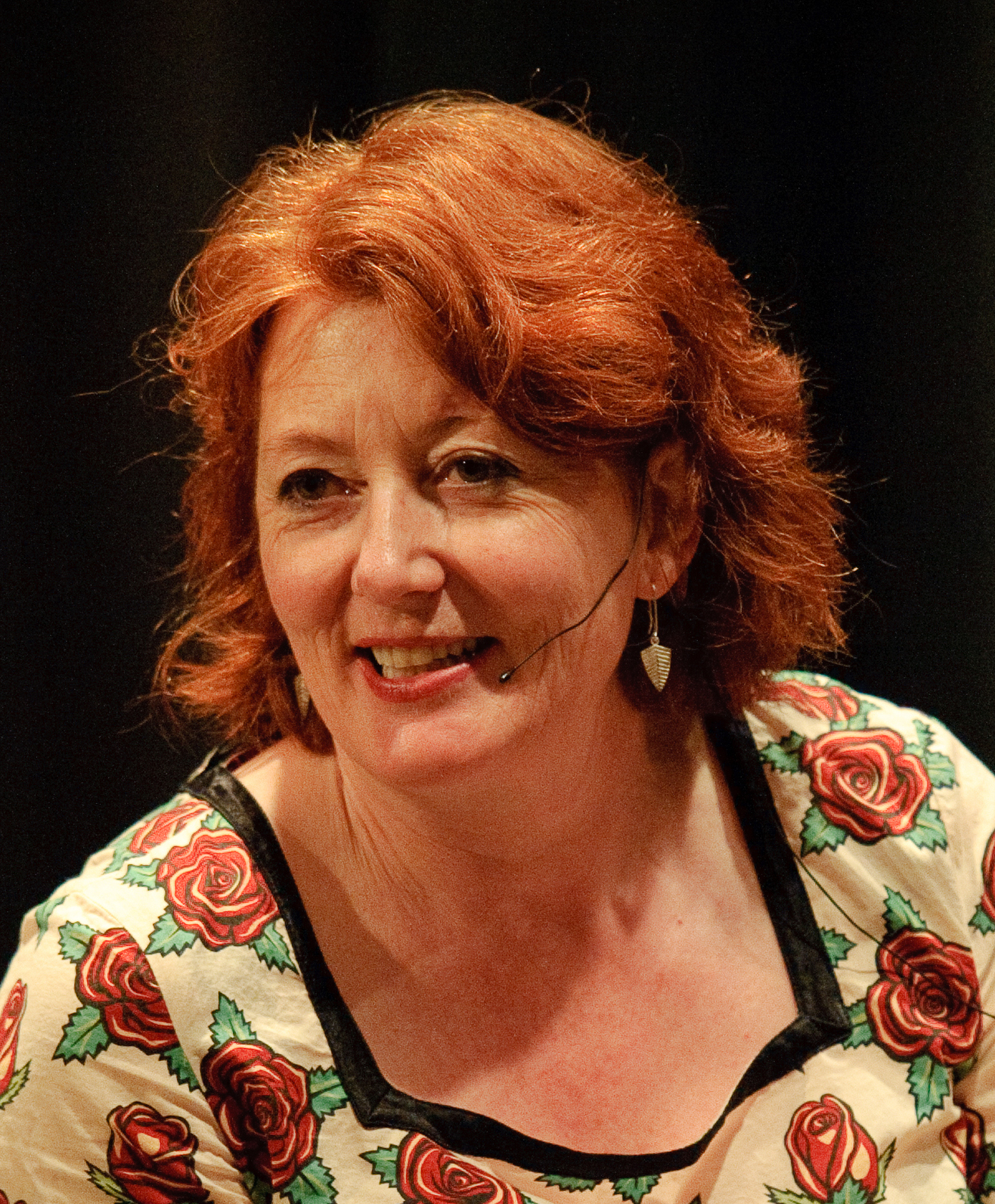
Maggie Barry

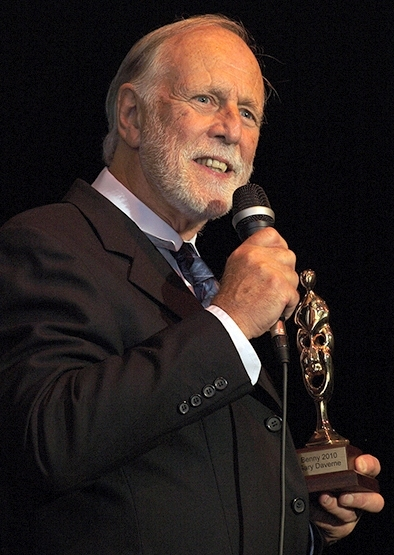
Gary Daverne

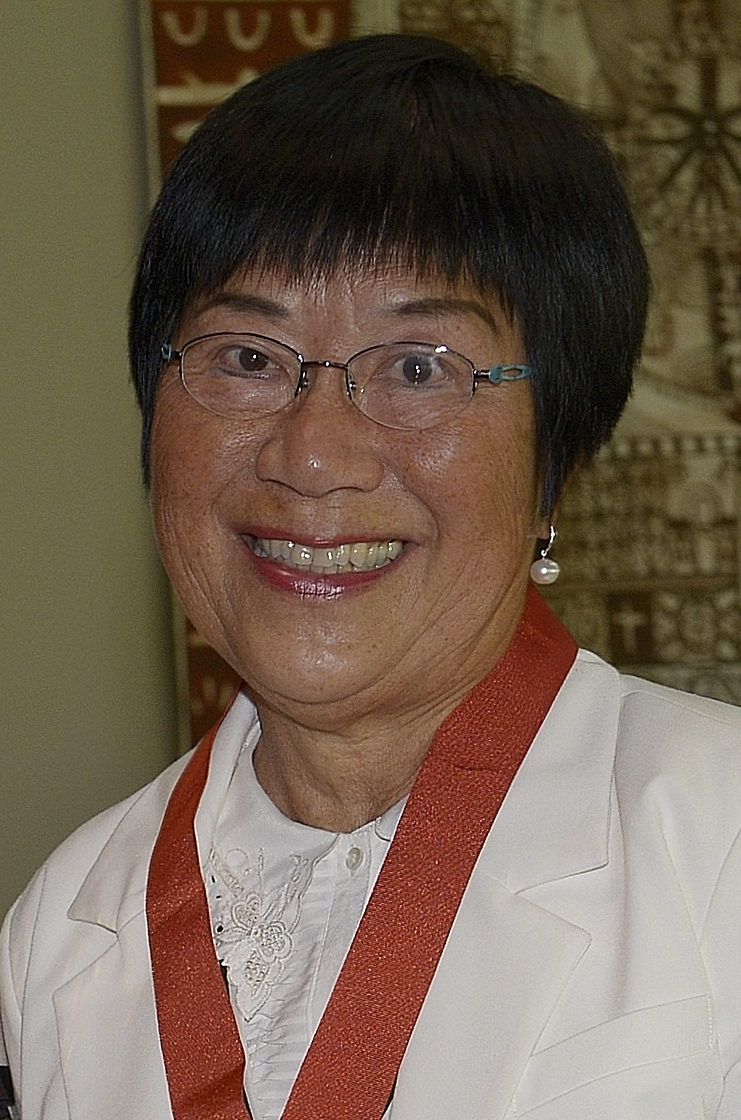
Manying Ip

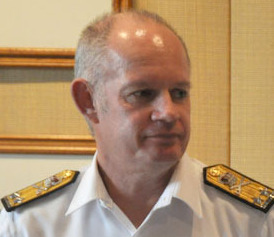
Jack Steer

=== Member (MNZM) ===
- Dr Ronald Thomas Ewen Baker – of Ashburton. For services to the community.
- Elaine Constance Barnett – of Tawa. For services to education.
- Sydney Raymond Bennett JP – of Timaru. For services to local government and the community.
- Major Neil Harry Bleasdale – Royal New Zealand Infantry Regiment.
- Alan Robert Tighe Brady – of Queenstown. For services to the wine industry.
- Karroll Isobel May Brent-Edmondson – of Tuakau. For services to business and the community.
- Edna Maureen Brooker – of Auckland. For services to local-body and community affairs.
- Kingita Te Pohe (Bill) Bush – of Christchurch. For services to rugby.
- Denis Rex Byles – of Ōtorohanga. For services to dairy farming and the community.
- Alfred Richard Davis – of Winton. For services to the community.
- Lewis James Day DFC – of Auckland. For services to aviation.
- Molly Doreen Donald – of Auckland. For services to the theatre.
- Warrant Officer John Hector D'Rose – Royal New Zealand Air Force.
- June Rosalie Ellison – of Paraparaumu Beach. For services to the community.
- Norma May Evans – of Rotorua. For services to the community.
- Sergeant Jodie Kim Ewens (née Boyd) – Royal New Zealand Air Force.
- Peter Momoe Fatialofa – of Auckland. For services to rugby.
- Flora Sarah Grant – of Gore. For services to the community.
- Trevor Joseph Grice – of Waikanae. For services to the community.
- Shirley Margaret Gubb – of Warkworth. For services to the community.
- Edward John Hazlett – of Thornbury. For services to export.
- Michael James Bowie Hobbs – of Wellington. For services to rugby.
- The Reverend Father David Mostyn Jillett – of Auckland. For services to music and the community.
- Elisabeth Leaworthy Maddock – of Auckland. For services to the community.
- Lieutenant Commander Alan John Ogilvie Martin – Royal New Zealand Navy.
- Maureen Frances McMinn – of Napier. For services to the community.
- Ian Jordon Mitchell – of New Plymouth. For services to law and the community.
- Temuera Morrison – of Auckland. For services to drama.
- The Reverend Desmond Ronald Olney – of Ruakākā. For services to the community.
- Aureole Blanche Retter JP – of Auckland. For services to the community.
- Kenneth James Scott – of Oamaru. For services to the community.
- Sister Jean Mary Sinclair – of Auckland. For services to intellectually handicapped.
- John Robert Street – of Auckland. For services to yachting and maritime affairs.
- William Peter Tait JP – of Whakatāne. For services to local government.
- Professor (Peter) Nicholas Tarling – of Auckland. For services to historical research and the arts.
- Leading Marine Mechanic Michael John Walker – Royal New Zealand Navy.
- Donald Bryan Whelan – of Christchurch. For services to music.
- Trooper Damian Hona Te Tokotu White – Royal New Zealand Armoured Corps.
- Duncan Kenneth Bryce Whiting – of Blenheim. For services to the theatre.
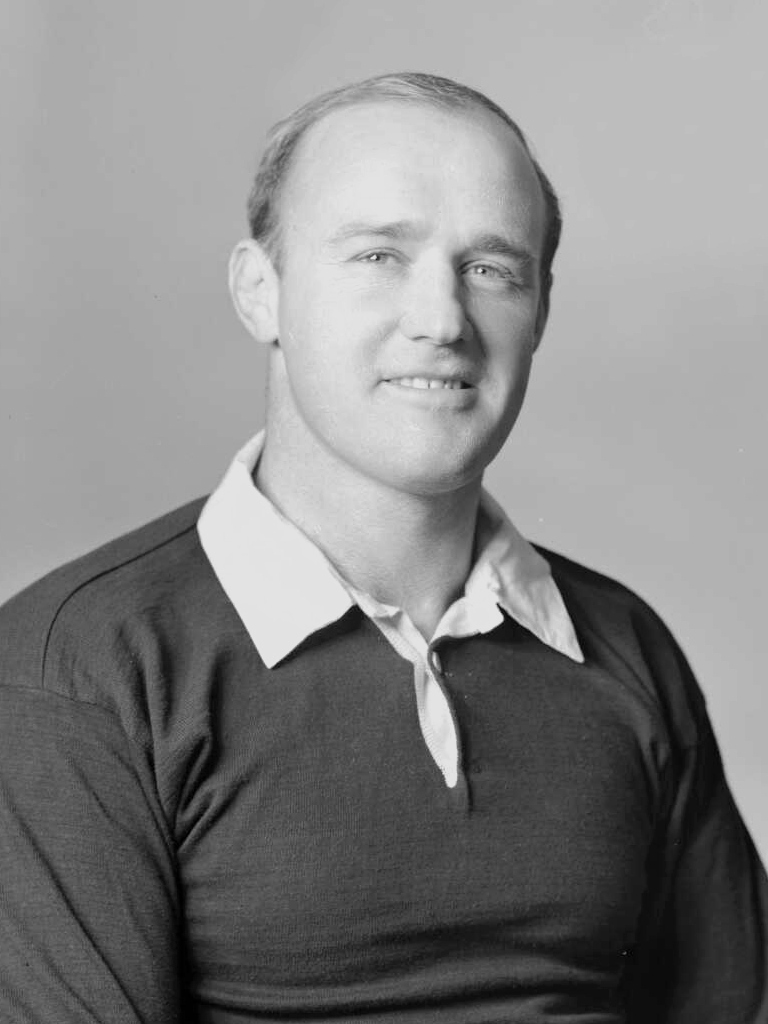
Jack Hazlett

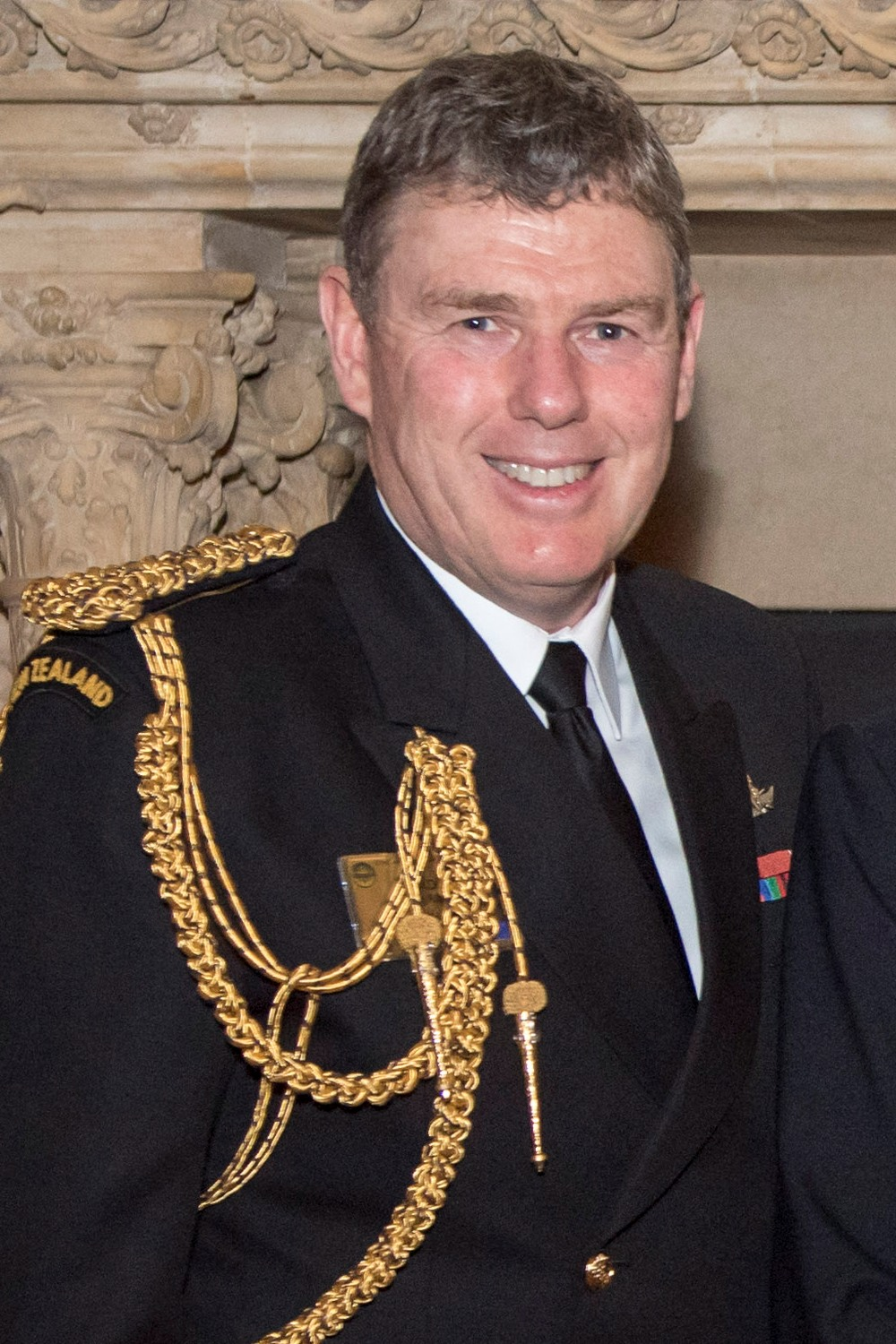
John Martin

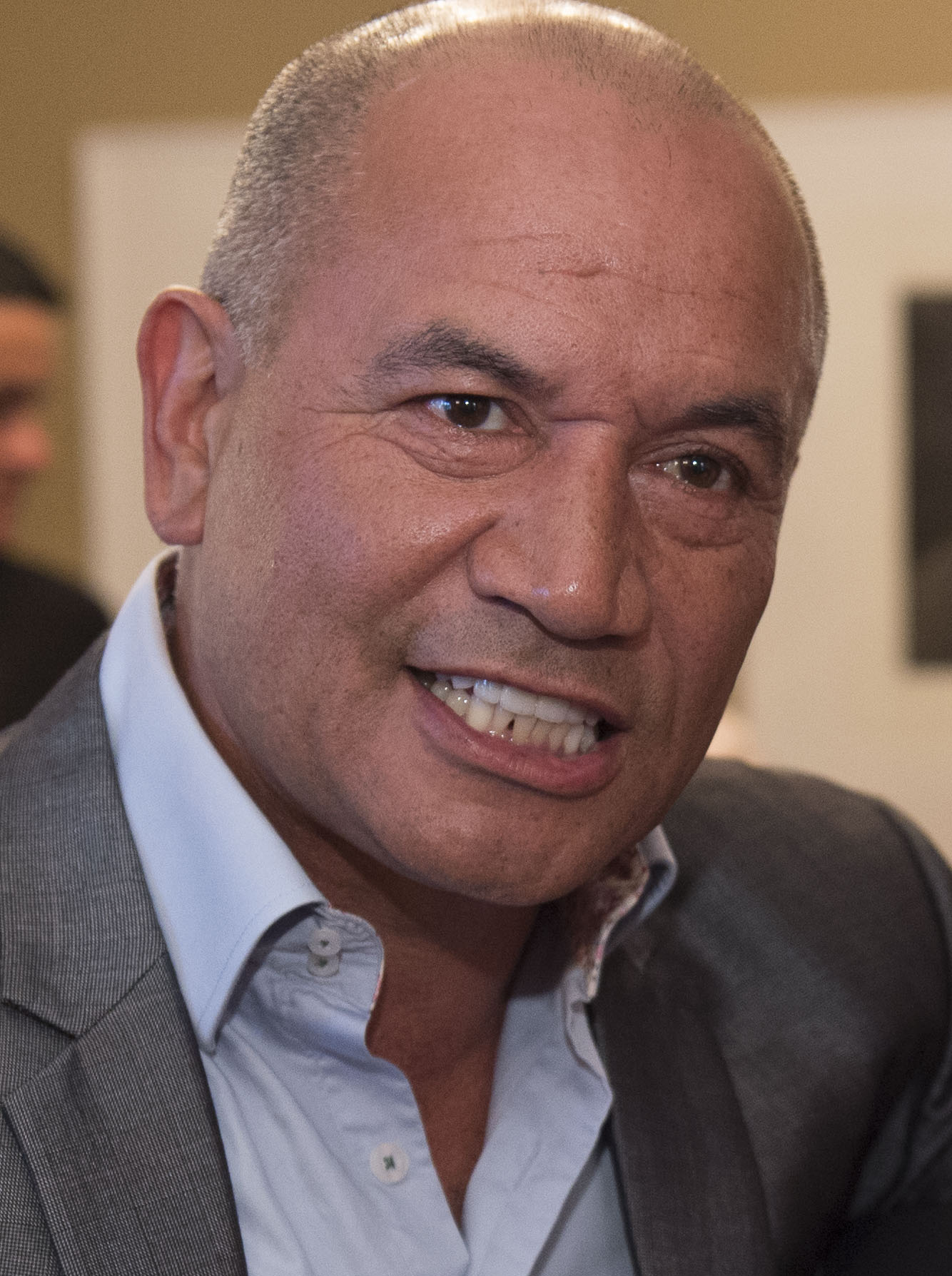
Temuera Morrison

== Companion of the Queen's Service Order (QSO) ==
=== For community service ===
- Pamela Jane Cook – of Lower Hutt.
- Dorothy May Nicholas – of Auckland.
- Margaret Ryan – of Lower Hutt.
- Nana Teahu Smith – of Wairoa.
- Maureen Frances van der Heyden – of Te Aroha.

=== For public services ===
- Douglas Keith Armstrong – of Auckland.
- Keith Clarke – of Mount Manganui.
- John William (Jim) Earwaker JP – of Te Awamutu.
- Michael Roderick Gross – of Kerikeri.
- June Temuranga Jackson – of Auckland.
- Colin Andrew MacIntosh – of Christchurch.
- Juliet Mary Broad McKee – of Wellington.
- The Honourable Margaret Kerslake Shields – of Pukerua Bay.
- Richard Francis Walls JP – of Dunedin.
- Una Florence Wood JP – of Dunedin.
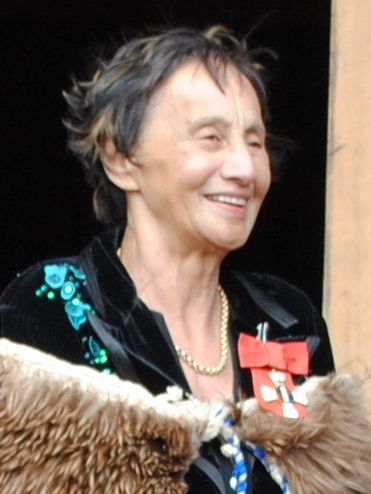
June Jackson

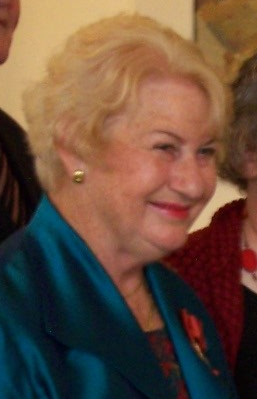
Margaret Shields

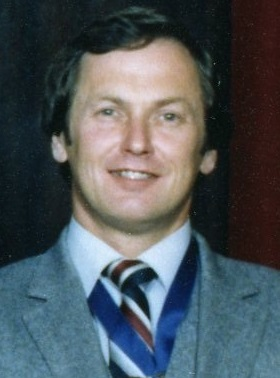
Richard Walls

== Queen's Service Medal (QSM) ==
=== For community service ===
- Archibald Veitch Campbell Austin – of Dunedin.
- Mavis Winnie Barnett – of Dunsandel.
- Suzanne Elizabeth Hone Bason – of Papatoetoe.
- Lynette Nellie Bellamy – of Upper Hutt.
- Joan Bennett – of Auckland.
- Gloria Margaret Campbell – of Greymouth.
- Horace Virgil Carrington – of Waihi.
- Constance Melina Crooks – of Auckland.
- Zena Falk – of Foxton.
- Kennett Beacham Geenty – of Napier.
- Una Fosella Halford – of Norsewood.
- Mary Eliza (Mere) Hamilton – of Manurewa.
- Barbara MacLeod Heasman – of Turua.
- Thomas Kahi – of Christchurch.
- Edward Henry William Kenny – of Tawa.
- Dennis Kirkpatrick – of Roxburgh.
- Gwenda Lilian Kirkwood – of Matamata.
- Joy Patricia McKinnel – of Invercargill.
- Doris Margaret Ogilvie Marshall – of Christchurch.
- Sylvia Mae Pedersen – of Taupō.
- Johanna Margery Raymond – of Cambridge.
- Isabel Ngaio Reeves – of Tokoroa.
- Pamela Reid – of Tākaka.
- Rapiata Darcy Ria – of Gisborne.
- Desma Jessie Riddle – of Auckland.
- Mary Elizabeth Shepherd – of Whakatāne.
- Lyla Ethel Sherriff – of Tuatapere.
- Tira Autahi Moai Tihi – of Tāneatua.
- Dorothy Mary Toomer – of Whangārei.
- Harold Harry Toomer – of Whangārei.
- Lois Beverley Whiting – of Tauranga.
- Rahera Windsor – of London, United Kingdom.

=== For public services ===
- Robert John Alderton – of Auckland.
- Matapaka Tangata Mouauri Arai – of Wellington.
- Ronald Victor Braithwaite – of Warkworth.
- Noel John Charles Byford JP – of Taihape.
- Margaret Christie – of Orewa.
- Lynda Ruth Dowsett – of Dunedin.
- Gerald Joseph Finn – of Dunedin; sergeant, New Zealand Police.
- Raman Diyar Ganda – of Waitakere (West Auckland).
- Gerald Hugh Geddes JP – of Lawrence; lately chief fire officer, Lawrence Volunteer Fire Brigade, New Zealand Fire Service.
- Marie Jean Hallaran – of Reefton.
- Joseph Arthur Heberley – of Picton.
- Elaine Margaret Hills JP – of Te Aroha.
- Lesley Ann Howat – of Mount Maunganui.
- Pauline Jenkins JP – of Blenheim.
- Angela Mary Kearney – of Christchurch.
- Raymond Leslie Kenny JP – of Kaiapoi.
- Olive Gwendolyn McCay – of Auckland.
- Carol Ann Melville – of Dunedin.
- Phillip John Munro – of Auckland.
- Patrick Verdun Neary – of Christchurch.
- Selwyn Roy Pawson – of Masterton.
- David John Te-O-Tane Ratapu – of Russell; constable, New Zealand Police.
- George William Steniford Roberts – of Whangārei.
- Dr Cita Valerie Cross Shanks – of Auckland.
- Te Riutoto Cissy Stafford – of Blenheim.
- Jack Evans Stuart – of Hokitika.
- Althea Rangititiahoa Vercoe JP – of Rotorua.
- William Te Rauna Williams – of Moerewa.
