= Wetere =

Wetere or Wētere is a personal name associated with people from the Ngāti Maniapoto iwi in New Zealand. The name is a transliteration of 'Wesley' into the Māori language. Notable people with that name include:

- Koro Wētere (1935–2018), New Zealand politician
- Rongo Wetere, New Zealand educator
- Wetere Te Rerenga (died 1889), New Zealand tribal leader
