= Pam Williams =

New Zealand businesswoman and philanthropist (1933–2021)

Pam Williams QSO
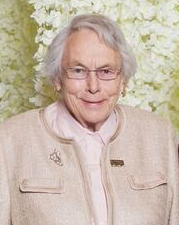
- Williams in 2017
- Born: Pamela Margaret Jean Pearce; 4 July 1933; Whanganui, New Zealand
- Died: 5 October 2021 (aged 88); Whanganui, New Zealand
- Occupation: Businesswoman
- Known for: Founding of Wanganui Seafoods

Pamela Margaret Jean Williams QSO (née Pearce; 4 July 1933 – 5 October 2021) was a New Zealand businesswoman and philanthropist. She was the founder or co-founder of six companies, including Wanganui Seafoods, one of the largest seafood export businesses in New Zealand. She was a benefactor of many organisations in and around her home town of Whanganui, including the Sarjeant Gallery and Bushy Park. In 2017, Williams was inducted into the New Zealand Business Hall of Fame.

== Early life and family ==
Born on 4 July 1933, Williams was raised on a farm in the Waitōtara Valley, north of Whanganui. She was home-schooled until her last two years of secondary education when she boarded at Woodford House. Her father, Frank Pearce, died when she was a teenager, and she and her two brothers took over the running of the farm. She married a local farmer, Evan Williams, and they had two daughters, but the marriage ended in the late 1960s.

== Business career ==
Williams established Wanganui Trawlers with local lawyer Gordon Swan, initially with one trawler fishing inshore waters and supplying local fish and chip shops. When the New Zealand exclusive economic zone was extended to 200 miles in 1977, Williams gained an offshore fishing quota that allowed the business to expand. Joint ventures with Korean, Japanese and Russian fishing companies followed, and the company grew to a peak of 200 full-time staff, exporting to 16 countries. In 1994, she sold the business to Sanford Limited for $36.5 million.

Williams subsequently served as chair of the Fisheries Authority Committee and was on the board of the Accident Compensation Corporation for nine years. In 1993, she was awarded the New Zealand Suffrage Centennial Medal, and in the 1997 New Year Honours, she was appointed a Companion of the Queen's Service Order for public services.

In 2017, Williams was inducted into the New Zealand Business Hall of Fame.

== Philanthropy ==
Following the sale of Wanganui Seafoods, Williams was active in Whanganui community organisations. She was a board member of the Cooks Gardens Trust, and served on local job-creation organisations. She made financial contributions to community groups including the Waimarie Riverboat Trust, Bushy Park, Sport Whanganui, and the Sargeant Gallery, to which she gave $1 million.

== Death ==
Williams died in Whanganui on 5 October 2021.
