= John Martin (New Zealand admiral) =

Royal New Zealand Navy officer

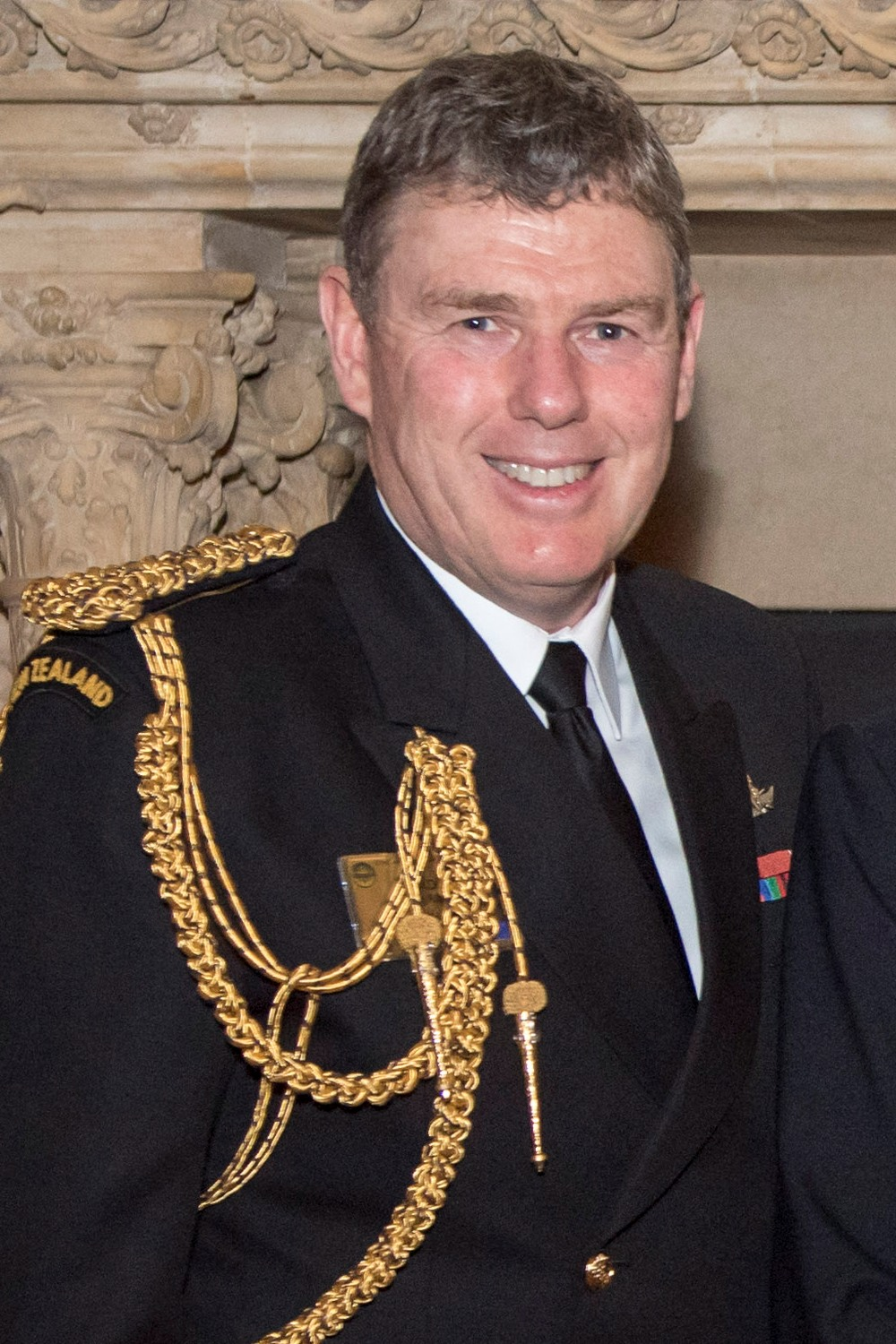
- John Martin in September 2016
- Born: Dunedin, New Zealand
- Military career
- Allegiance: New Zealand
- Branch: Royal New Zealand Navy
- Service years: 1979–2018
- Rank: Rear Admiral
- Commands: Chief of the Navy (2015–18); Maritime Component Commander (2011–13); HMNZS Te Kaha (2001–03)
- Awards: Officer of the New Zealand Order of Merit

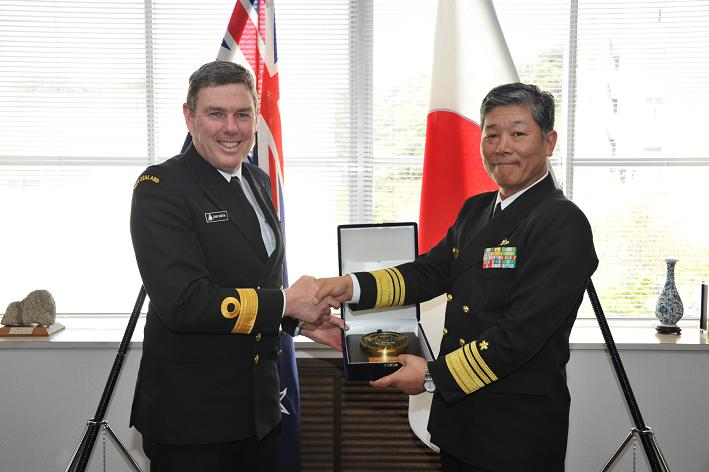
Commodore Martin (left) visits the Japanese Self Defence Fleet Headquarters in Yokosuka, October 2012

Rear Admiral Alan John Ogilvie Martin, ONZM is a retired officer of the Royal New Zealand Navy, who served as Chief of the Navy from 30 November 2015 to 29 November 2018.

Born in Dunedin, Martin joined the navy in 1979. He served as commander of the Royal New Zealand Navy Fleet as the Maritime Component Commander from March 2011 to September 2013. Martin was appointed Member of the New Zealand Order of Merit (MNZM) in the 1996 Queen's Birthday Honours. In the 2003 Queen's Birthday Honours, he was promoted to Officer of the same order.

Military offices
Preceded by Rear Admiral Jack Steer	Chief of Navy; 2015–2018	Succeeded by Rear Admiral David Proctor
