= Jane Evans (artist) =

New Zealand artist (1946–2012)

Jane Evans ONZM
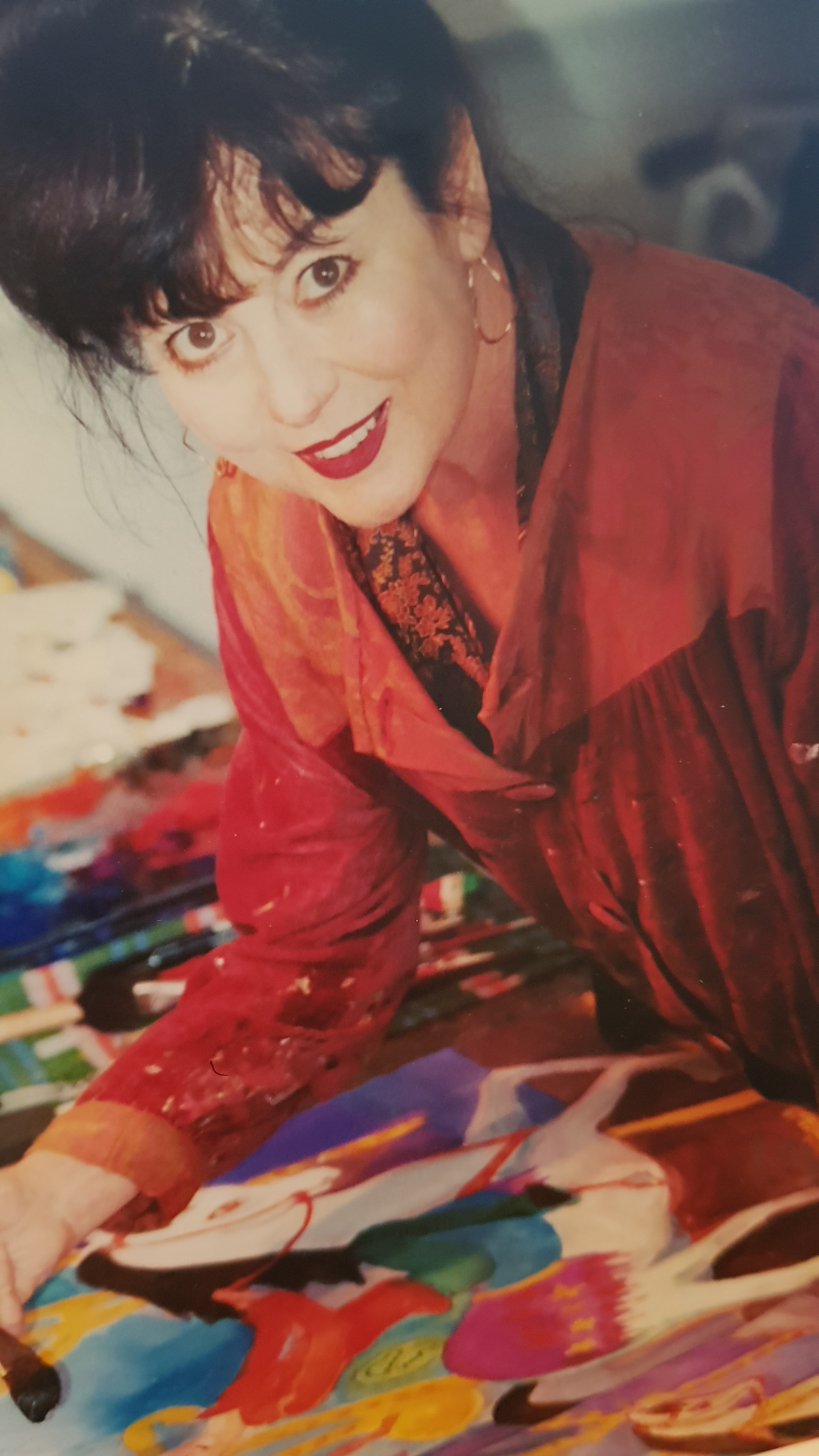
- Born: Elizabeth Jane Evans; 31 December 1946; Nelson, New Zealand
- Died: 8 June 2012 (aged 65); Nelson, New Zealand

Elizabeth Jane Evans ONZM (31 December 1946 – 8 June 2012) was a New Zealand artist.

== Biography ==
Born in Nelson in 1946, Evans was educated at Nelson College for Girls. She enrolled at the Ilam School of Fine Arts in 1965, and the following year began studying at Waltham Forest Art College in northeast London. However, after the first year she left to pursue a programme of self-education.

After an initial diagnosis of rheumatoid arthritis in 1965, Evans was diagnosed with systemic lupus erythematosus, a condition that was to affect her for the rest of her life. She adapted her painting method and media to accommodate her condition. She moved back to New Zealand in late 1967, living first in Christchurch before returning to Nelson in 1971.

In the 1990's Evans, David Furniss and Terence Blyth created a company called Global Internet Systems to design and build coin operated internet kiosks.

In the 1997 New Year Honours, Evans was appointed an Officer of the New Zealand Order of Merit, for services to painting.

Evans died at her home in Nelson in 2012.

The Suter Art Gallery in Nelson holds 11 works by Evans, the largest number by the artist in any public collection.
