= 1997 New Year Honours (New Zealand) =

Annual awards for New Zealanders

- Previous: 1996 Special Honours; Next: 1997 Queen's Birthday Honours
- Type: New Zealand royal honours: New Zealand Order of Merit; Royal Victorian Order; Queen's Service Order; Queen's Service Medal
- Date: 31 December 1996
- Country: New Zealand
- Total recipients: 155

The 1997 New Year Honours in New Zealand were appointments by Elizabeth II in her right as Queen of New Zealand, on the advice of the New Zealand government, to various orders and honours to reward and highlight good works by New Zealanders, and to celebrate the passing of 1996 and the beginning of 1997. They were announced on 31 December 1996.

The recipients of honours are listed here as they were styled before their new honour.

== New Zealand Order of Merit ==
=== Dame Companion (DNZM) ===
- Dr Ella Orr Campbell – of Palmerston North. For services to science.
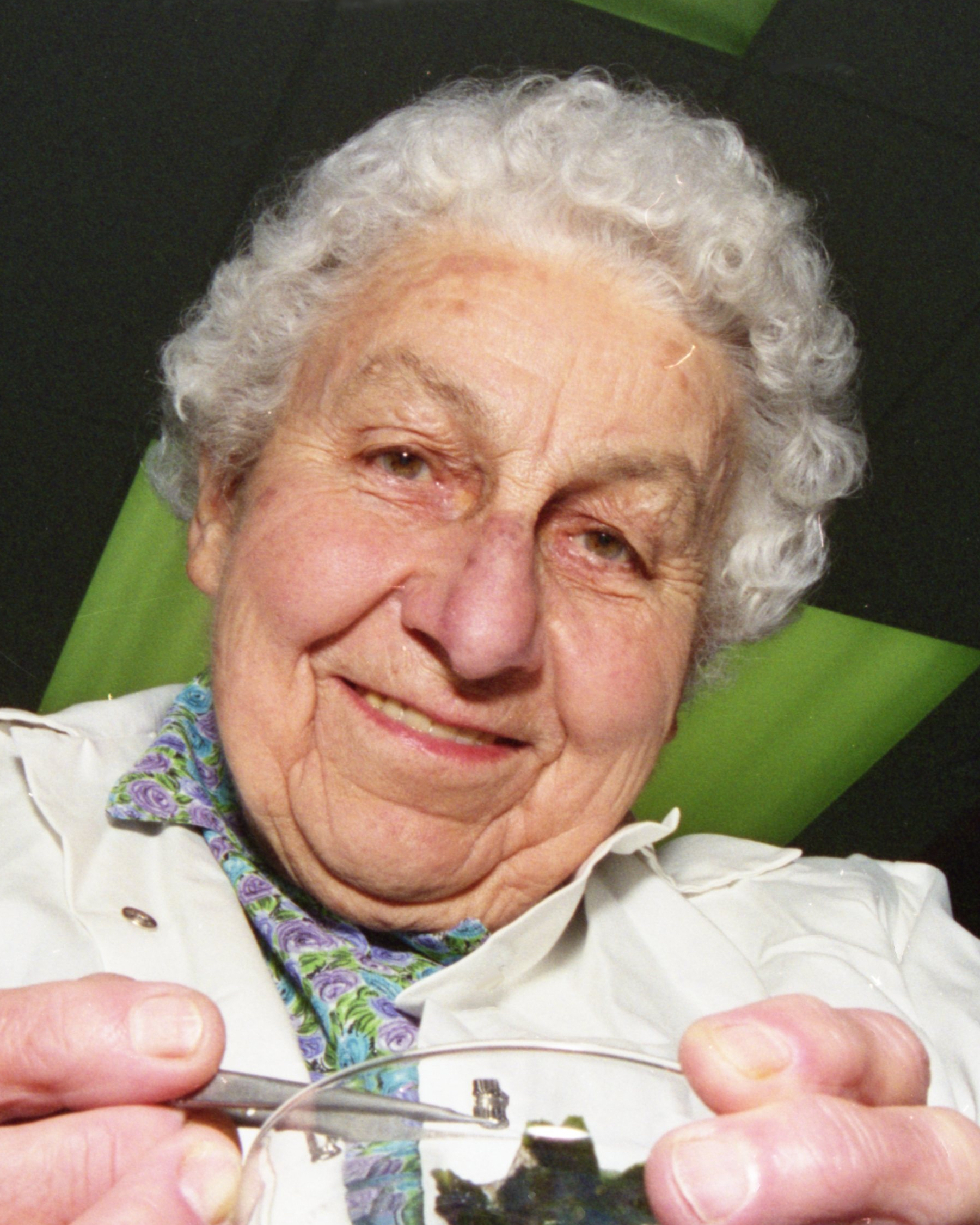
Dame Ella Campbell

=== Knight Companion (KNZM) ===
- Terence Power McLean MBE – of Auckland. For services to sporting journalism.
- The Honourable Peter Wilfred Tapsell MBE – of Rotorua. For public services, lately as Speaker of the House of Representatives.
- The Honourable Thomas Murray Thorp – of Auckland; judge of the High Court 1979–1996.
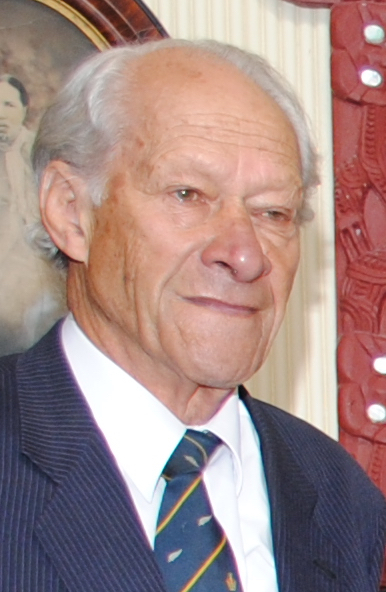
Sir Peter Tapsell

=== Companion (CNZM) ===
- Associate Professor Judith Mary Caroline Binney – of Auckland. For services to historical research.
- The Honourable David Francis Caygill – of Christchurch. For public services.
- The Honourable Warren Ernest Cooper JP – of Queenstown. For public services.
- Brigadier Ian James Duthie – Brigadiers' List, New Zealand Army.
- The Honourable John Howard Falloon – of Bideford. For public services.
- The Honourable Colin Campbell Fraser – of Christchurch; judge of the High Court 1989–1996.
- Ida Margaret Gaskin – of New Plymouth. For services to education and the community.
- Donald Kent Hunn – of Ōtaki. For services as State Services Commissioner.
- Alan Ronald Kerr – of Auckland. For services to cardiothoracic surgery.
- Professor Peggy Gwendoline Koopman-Boyden – of Hamilton. For services to the elderly.
- Charles Seymour Luney QSO – of Christchurch. For services to the building industry and the community.
- Dr Geraldine McDonald – of Wellington. For services to educational research.
- Elizabeth Welch Orr – of Wellington. For services to education and the community.
- Dr Clive Bentley Ross – of Auckland. For services to dental surgery.
- Kuru (Te Kuru-o-Te-Marama) Waaka QSO – of Rotorua. For services to Māori culture.
Judith Binney

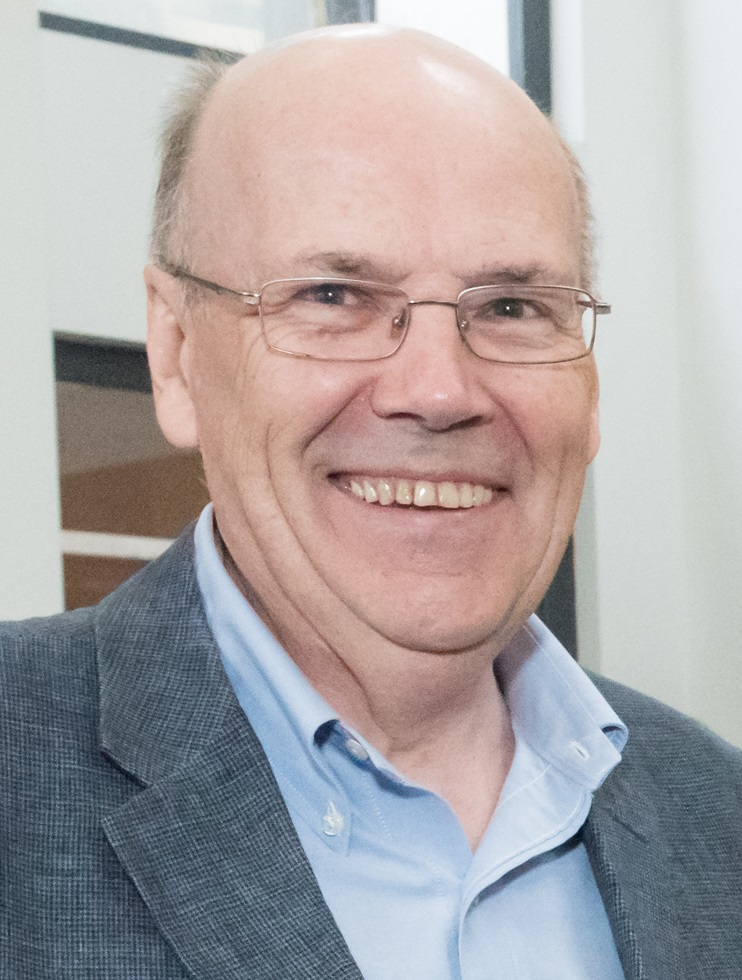
David Caygill

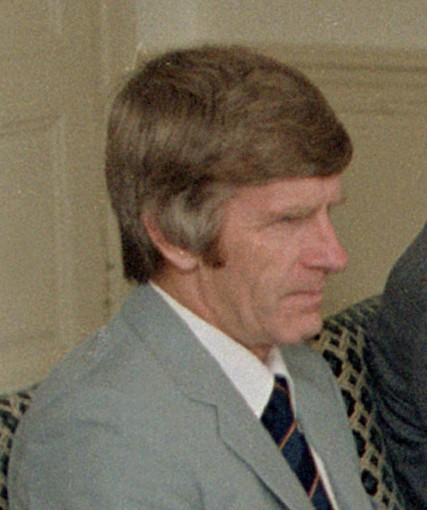
Warren Cooper

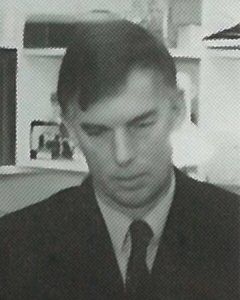
John Falloon

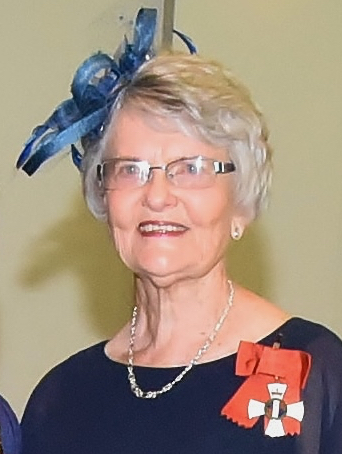
Peggy Koopman-Boyden

=== Officer (ONZM) ===
- Toni-Maria Allwood – of Wellington. For services to women.
- Peter Warwick Averi – of Paraparaumu. For services to music.
- Ian Hugh Boyd – of Levin. For services to athletics.
- Dr Margaret Elaine di Menna – of Hamilton. For services to microbiology.
- Elizabeth Jane Evans – of Nelson. For services to painting.
- Kerry John Everson QFSM – of Torquay, Victoria, Australia; lately chief fire service officer, New Zealand Fire Service.
- Jacqueline Mary Fahey – of Auckland. For services to art.
- Sean Brian Thomas Fitzpatrick – of Auckland. For services to rugby.
- Ross Goodin – of Te Kauwhata. For services to viticulture.
- Elaine Clark Herbert – of Tapanui. For services to floral art.
- Bronwen Scott Holdsworth – of Te Karaka. For services to business, art and the community.
- John Virtue Ilott – of Wellington. For services to the community.
- Duane Paul Kale – of Havelock North. For services to swimming.
- Danyon Joseph Loader – of Dunedin. For services to swimming.
- Neville Epplett Lobb – of Mount Maunganui. For services to the tourism and travel industries.
- Wing Commander John Christopher Mathewson – Royal New Zealand Air Force.
- Mary Elizabeth McGiven – of Christchurch. For services to the National Council of Women.
- Stuart Ross McRobie – of Hamilton. For services to the community.
- Michael Stewart Morris – of Wellington. For services to business and the community.
- Professor George Bouet Petersen – of Dunedin. For services to the community.
- Eric Matahaere Ropiha – of Woodville. For services to racing and equestrian sport.
- Peter Webster Wilson – of Auckland. For services to tennis.

Additional

- Lieutenant Colonel Andrew John Martin – Royal New Zealand Infantry Regiment. For military operations with the United Nations Protection Force in former Yugoslavia.
- Lance Bombardier Leighton Timothy Thompson – Royal Regiment of New Zealand Artillery. For military operations with the United Nations Protection Force in former Yugoslavia.
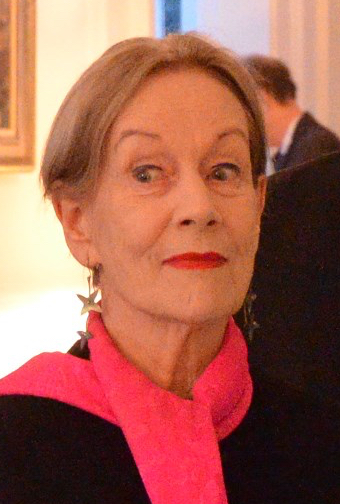
Jacqueline Fahey

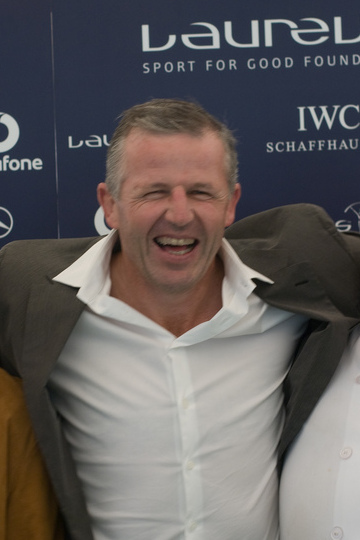
Sean Fitzpatrick

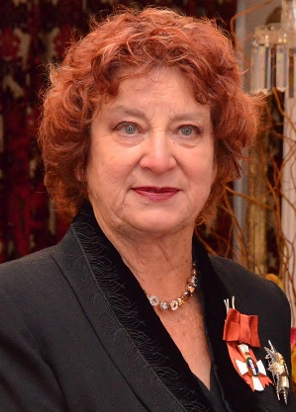
Bronwen Holdsworth

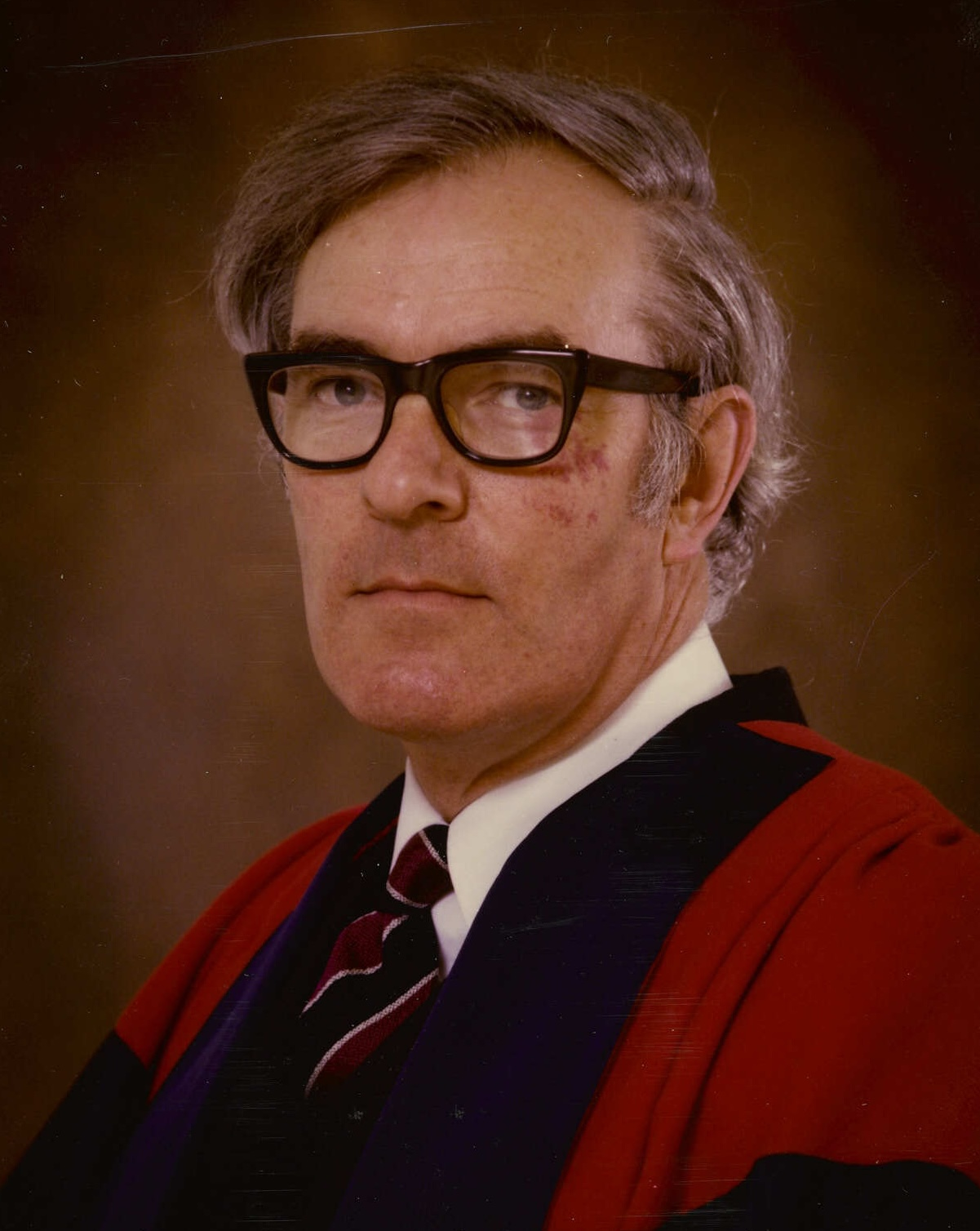
George Petersen

=== Member (MNZM) ===
- Struan Robert Anderson – of Winton. For services to the community.
- Marjorie Roseanne Blythen – of Warkworth. For services to the community.
- Graham Thomas Bone – of Greymouth. For services to sport and the community.
- Zinzan Valentine Brooke – of Auckland. For services to rugby.
- Kevin James Campbell – of Wellington. For services to aircraft safety.
- Joyce Alberta Carmichael – of Riverton. For services to the community.
- Garth McMillan Cassidy – of Waipukurau. For services to transport communication.
- Robert Cooper – of Auckland. For services to the port industry.
- Anthony Robin Thomas Corcoran – of Christchurch. For services to the community.
- Ashley James McLean Crampton JP – of Whangaparāoa. For services to welfare work.
- Victor Bruce Cunningham – of Mount Maunganui. For services to local government and the community.
- Lois Dorothy Daish – of Wellington. For services to the food industry.
- Dr William John Dart – of Auckland. For services to art and music.
- Emeritus Professor Paul Woodford Day – of Hamilton. For services to the community.
- Robert Knox De Castro – of Blenheim. For services to horticulture.
- Lawrence Samuel Dennis JP – of Wellington. For services to tourism and the hospitality industry.
- John Burnett Dodds – of Wellington. For services to music.
- Warrant Officer Kevin John Farley – Royal New Zealand Air Force.
- Rae Margaret Frampton – of Auckland. For services to the community.
- Gary Freeman – of Sydney, Australia. For services to rugby league.
- John Joseph Lawrence Going – of Whangārei. For services to tourism.
- Michael Niko Jones – of Auckland. For services to rugby.
- June Seeta McBride – of Tauranga. For services to education and the community.
- Bernadine Mary Meech – of Pahiatua. For services to the community.
- Francis William Bruce Miller – of Christchurch. For services to the pork industry.
- Dr Peter William Moller – of Christchurch. For services to medicine.
- Dorothy Lillian Nicholls – of Eltham. For services to the community.
- Brendan McPadden O'Connor – of Wellington. For services to public speaking.
- Beryl Emma Jean Paine – of Nelson. For services to the community.
- Tangiia Nooroa Paniora – of Tauranga. For services to the community.
- Rewiti Pomare Kingi Paraone – of Auckland. For services to Māori and the community.
- Apryll Hiria Parata-Blane – of Ruatoria. For services to education.
- Valarie Winnifred Penty – of Timaru. For services to the community.
- Alan David Ralph – of Auckland. For services to the disabled.
- Lieutenant Commander Frank Rands – Royal New Zealand Navy.
- Warrant Officer Paul Andrew Rennie – Royal New Zealand Navy.
- Major David John Houghton Rhodes ED – Royal Regiment of New Zealand Artillery, Territorial Force.
- Kenneth Robert Rutherford – of Alexandra. For services to cricket.
- Kevin Ryan – of Auckland. For services to the community.
- Noma Jeanne Shepherd – of Kawakawa. For services to the community.
- Bruce Cameron Smith – of Ōhaupō. For services to farming.
- John Ru Hoani Tahuri – of Rotorua. For services to the community.
- Squadron Leader Peter Dennis Wooding – Royal New Zealand Air Force.

Additional

- Chief Petty Officer Radio Supervisor Alan Clifford Belcher – Royal New Zealand Navy. For military operations with the United Nations Protection Force in former Yugoslavia.
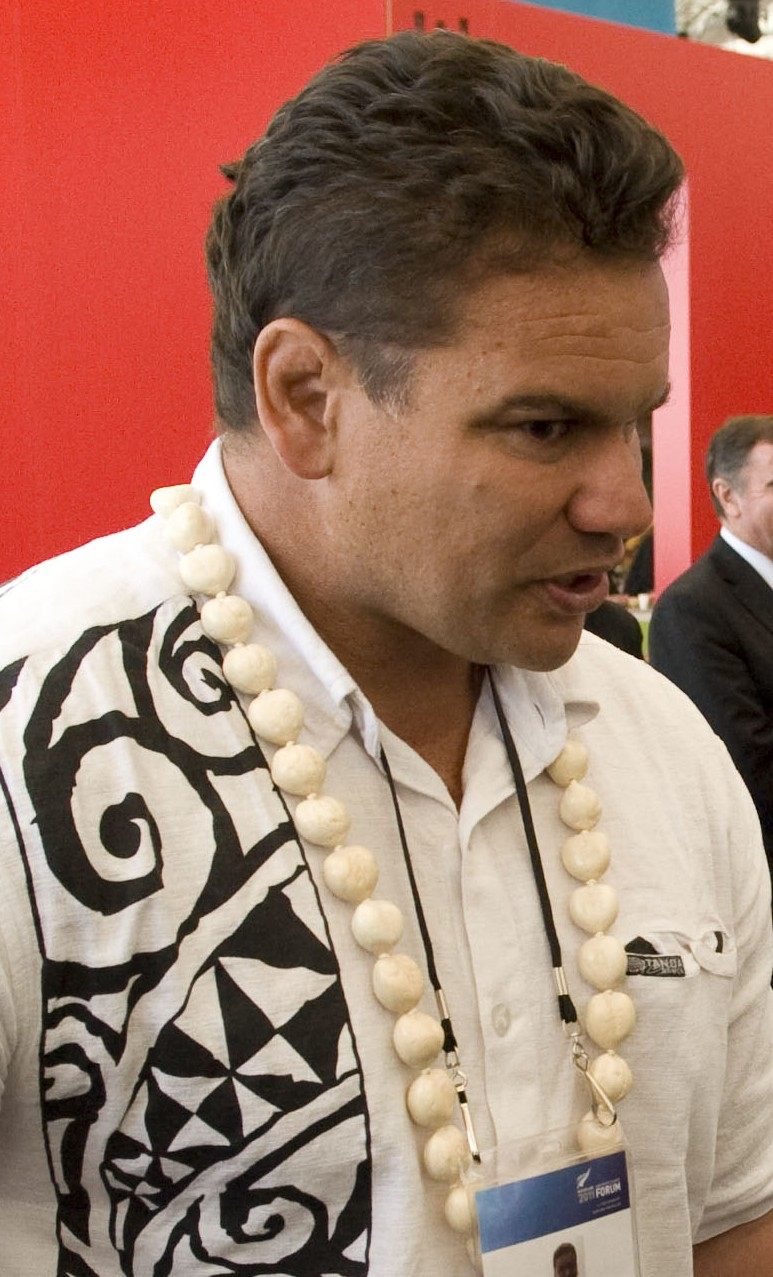
Michael Jones

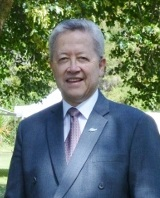
Pita Paraone

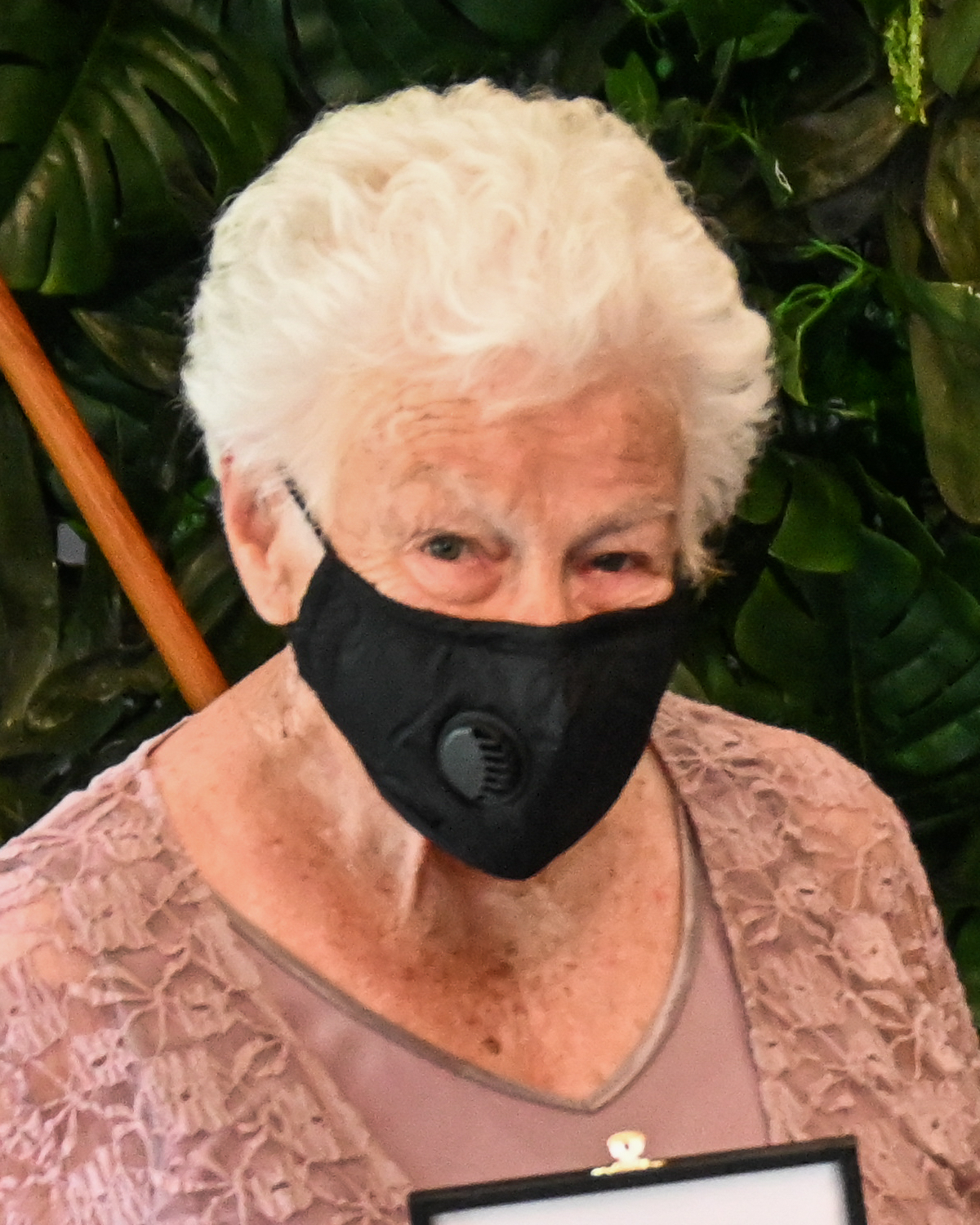
Noma Shepherd

== Royal Victorian Order ==
=== Lieutenant (LVO) ===
Bernard Joseph Frahm MVO – of Wellington.

== Companion of the Queen's Service Order (QSO) ==
=== For community service ===
- Marguerite Brough-Rossiter – of Whakatāne.
- Ruth Catherine Lemin – of Invercargill.
- The Reverend Maliko Setu Masina – of Porirua.
- Virginia (Ginny) Margaret Radford – of Auckland.
- Lorraine Margaret Storey – of Ohinewai.
- John Adam Wilson – of Upper Hutt.
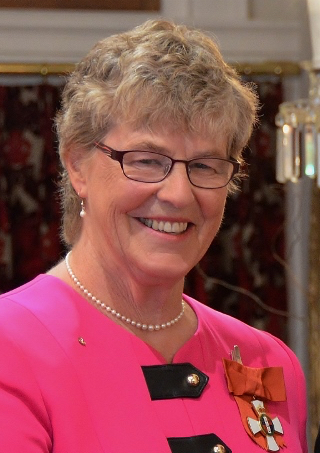
Ginny Radford

=== For public services ===
- Dr Judith Estranna Aitken – of Wellington.
- Louise Marion Carroll JP – of Auckland.
- Harold James Evans JP – of Christchurch.
- Rex Stratton Kirton JP – of Upper Hutt.
- Dr Michael Robert Miles – of Rotorua.
- Keith Hill Mitchell – of Wellington.
- Pamela Margaret Jean Williams – of Wanganui.
- Thomas Coldham Williams JP – of Masterton.
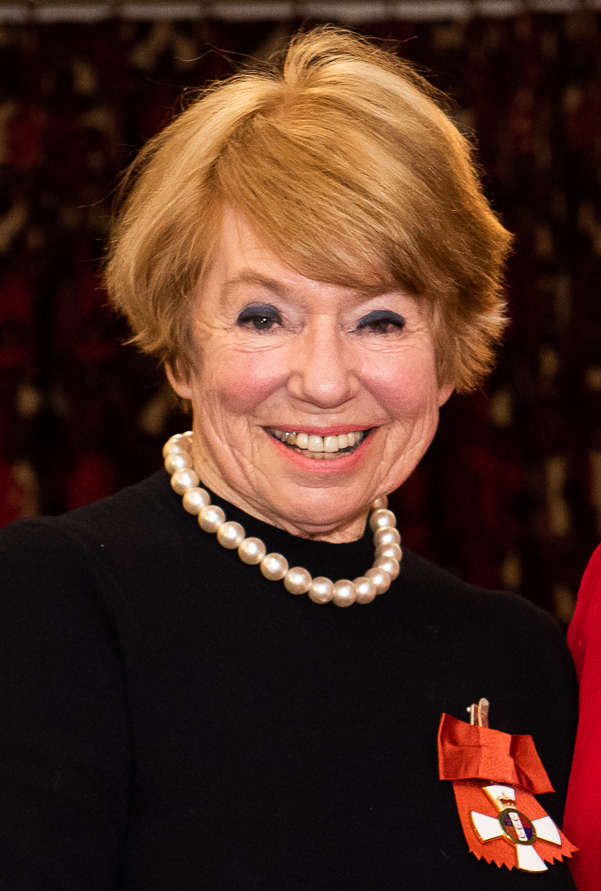
Judith Aitken

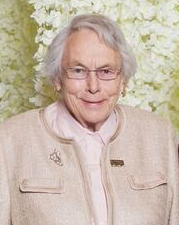
Pam Williams

== Queen's Service Medal (QSM) ==
=== For community service ===
- Dorothy Lila (Bonnie) Aiken – of Auckland.
- Thomas Sydney George Bentley JP – of Christchurch.
- Garry Leslie Brennan JP – of Auckland.
- Neva Yvonne Clarke McKenna – of Mangonui.
- Denis Ian Dove – of Oamaru.
- Grace Harriet Olive Dunsmuir – of Ngāruawāhia.
- Gloria Agnes Grattan – of Wellington.
- Beverley Bryna Holloway – of Auckland.
- Pauline Dalziel MacInnes – of Wellington.
- Tafaeafe A'aone Malifa-Poutoa JP – of Lower Hutt.
- Joan Patricia Morrison – of Christchurch.
- Tui Parsons – of Blenheim.
- Colleen Frances Pobar – of Wellington.
- Hanka (Hana) Pressburg – of Wellington.
- Makerita Samau-Auta JP – of Palmerston North.
- Keith Seyler – of Walton-on-Thames, Surrey, United Kingdom.
- Nita May Shannon – of Whakatāne.
- Kate Shaw – of Rotorua.
- Kathleen Nola Speir – of Tauranga.
- The Reverend Robert Alfred Spence – of Wellington.
- Jewel Sucich JP – of Kaitaia.
- Kina Zoe Tangiwai Dolly Tapper – of Matamata.
- Alison Caresa Underhill – of Carterton.
- Audrey Wilson – of Dunedin.
- Stuart McGregor Wood – of Rangiora.
- The Reverend Cecil Leonard Wright – of Auckland.

=== For public services ===
- John (Jack) Alexander Adam JP – of Waitakere City.
- David Aitken Alexander – of Palmerston North.
- Roger Murray Borlase JP – of Nelson.
- Marilyn Bernadette Bouzaid – of Masterton.
- David Walter Charles Cooper – of Morrinsville.
- William John Deed – of Waiuku.
- Robert James Douglas JP – of Hamilton.
- Ashley Brown Edwards – of North Shore City; inspector, New Zealand Police.
- Margaret Anne Faulkner – of Porirua.
- Dr Ephra Mary Garrett – of Tangimoana.
- Richard Paul Rennie Graham – of Napier; detective sergeant, New Zealand Police.
- Wallace Patrick Haumaha – of Rotorua; sergeant, New Zealand Police.
- Ruth Herbert – of Jakarta, Indonesia.
- Maurice Shaw Jones – of Dunedin.
- Margaret Annette Longuet-Higgins JP – of Wellsford.
- Peter Unwin McLay – of Whakatāne.
- Dr William Grattan O'Connell – of Auckland.
- Noeline Grace Owen – of Ōtorohanga.
- Kelvin Francis (Alby) Pahl – of Murchison; chief fire officer, Murchison Volunteer Fire Brigade, New Zealand Fire Service.
- Joseph Anzac Rewi JP – of Masterton.
- Niall Campbell Shepherd – of Arthur's Pass; senior constable, New Zealand Police.
- Bronte Stuart Sinclair – of Tauranga.
- Shirley Anne Slatter – of Mount Cook.
- Shirley Anne Stevenson – of Mosgiel.
- William Brian Stevenson JP – of Mosgiel.
- Mark Brendan Traynor – of Wellington.
- Charles Lawrence Waters – of Christchurch.
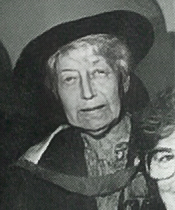
Ephra Garrett
