= Philippa Black =

New Zealand geologist (born 1941)

Philippa Black CNZM
- Born: 26 November 1941 (age 84)
- Education: University of Auckland
- Scientific career
- Fields: Mineralogy and Metamorphic Petrology
- Workplaces: University of Auckland
- Theses: Igneous and metamorphic rocks from Tokatoka, Northland (1964); Petrology of the Cuvier and Paritu Plutons and their metamorphic Aureoles (1967)
- Doctoral students: Bruce Hayward

Philippa Margaret Black CNZM (born 26 November 1941) is a New Zealand academic specialising in geology, specifically mineralogy and metamorphic petrology.

Black was born on 26 November 1941 in Hamilton. She is the daughter of Dorothy May (née Maslen) and James Corbett Black. She received her education at Taupiri Primary School, St Paul's Catholic School (primary school in Ngāruawāhia), and New Plymouth Girls' High School. She studied at the University of Auckland and earned a MSc and PhD in geology. The title of her 1964 master's thesis was Igneous and metamorphic rocks from Tokatoka, Northland. Her PhD focused on the Tokatea Reef in the hills behind Coromandel township and the title of her doctoral thesis was Petrology of the Cuvier and Paritu Plutons and their metamorphic Aureoles. She later got an MA in History. She was appointed a professor at the University of Auckland in 1986 and headed the department for 15 years.

Between 1993 and 1997, Black was president of the Royal Society of New Zealand, the first woman to hold the role. In the 1996 Queen's Birthday Honours, she was appointed a Companion of the New Zealand Order of Merit, for services to science.

In 2013, after her retirement, she was elected Companion to the Institution of Professional Engineers New Zealand (IPENZ). In 2017, she was selected as one of the Royal Society Te Apārangi's 150 women in 150 words, celebrating the contribution of women to knowledge in New Zealand.
