= Te Wānanga o Aotearoa =

New Zealand tertiary institute

- Type: Wānanga
- Established: 1984
- Chief executive: Nepia Winiata
- Students: 35,000
- Location: Factory Rd, Te Awamutu, New Zealand
- Campus: Multiple sites
- Website: www.twoa.ac.nz

Te Wānanga o Aotearoa is a Māori university and tertiary education provider with over 80 campuses throughout New Zealand. The indigenous-led organisation works towards "whānau transformation through education" including the redevelopment of Māori cultural knowledge and breaking inter-generational cycles of non-participation in tertiary education to reduce poverty and associated social issues.

Te Wānanga o Aotearoa is one of three such wānanga organisations in New Zealand and is one of the largest public tertiary education institutions in the nation.

== History ==
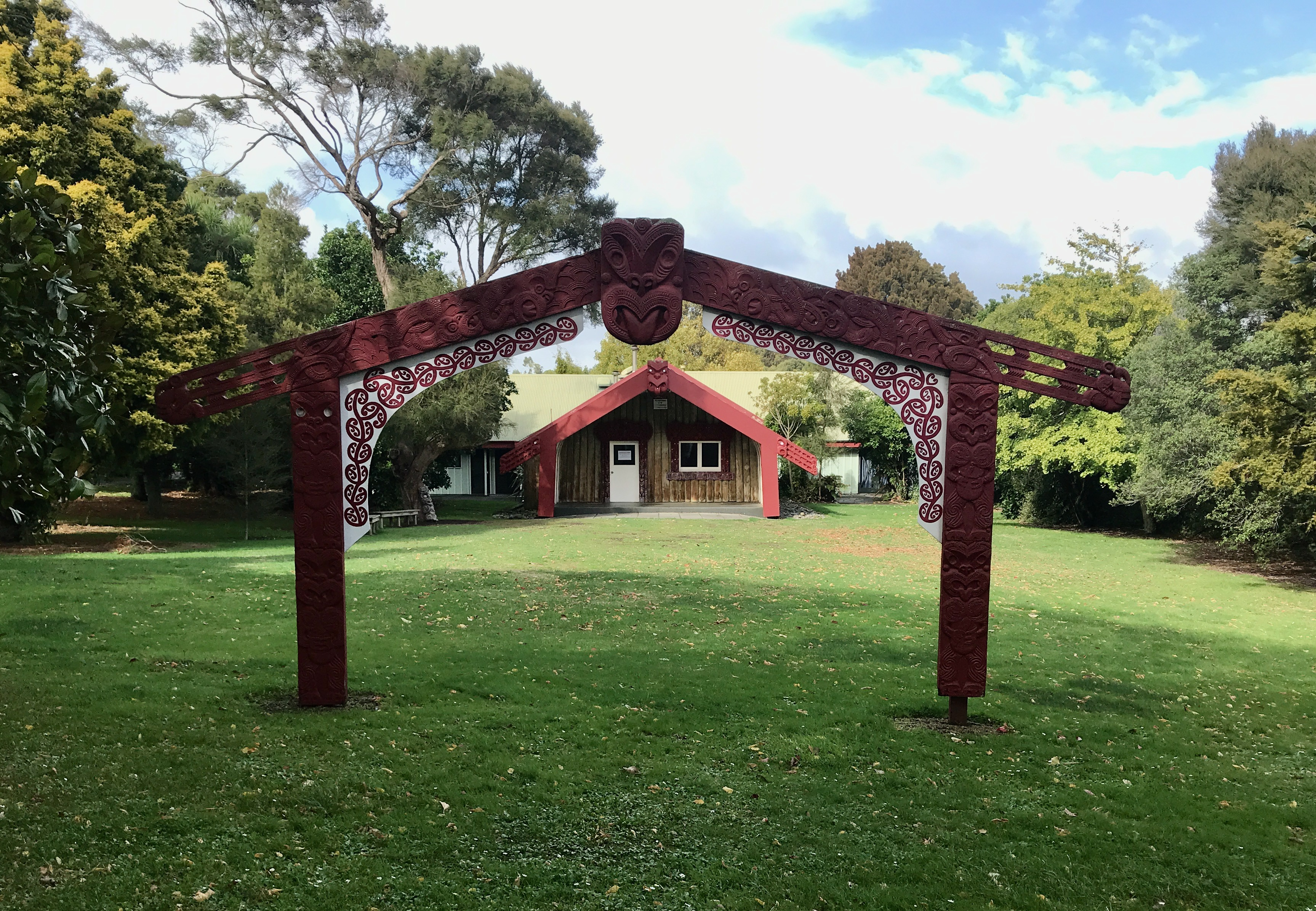
Marae and wharenui

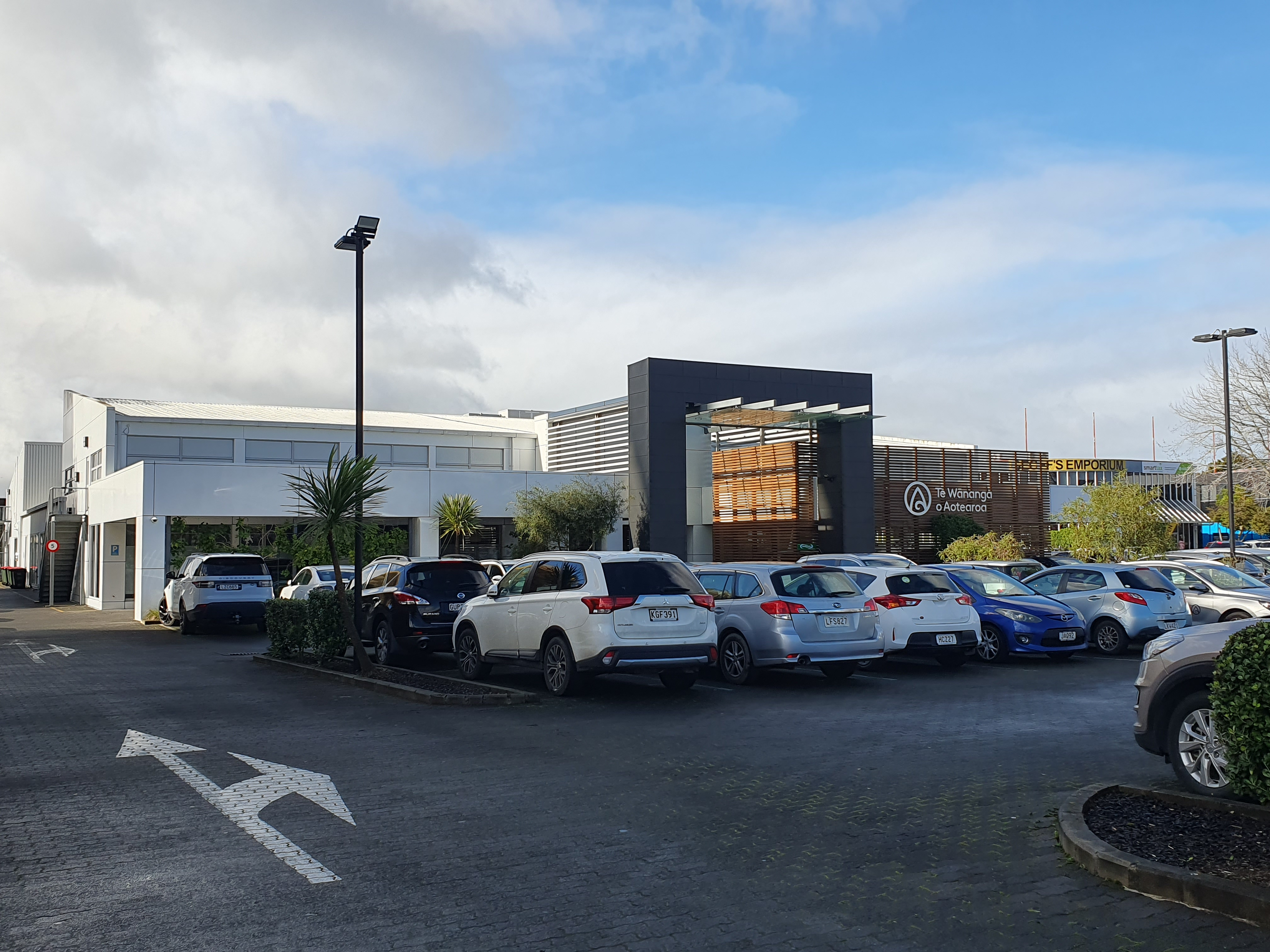
Waitākere Campus in Henderson, West Auckland

Te Wānanga o Aotearoa was founded in 1984 to provide training and education for those whose needs were not being met by the mainstream education system. Te Wānanga o Aotearoa was the brainchild of Te Awamutu College board of governors' member Rongo Wetere and Māori Studies teacher Iwi Kohuru (Boy) Mangu. The two men wanted to provide a "marae of learning" as an educational alternative for the large number of predominantly Māori students who were being expelled from Te Awamutu College.

Their solution was to lead a group of these students to create a wharenui on the college's grounds. The two men were joined in their endeavours by tohunga whakairo (master carvers) Pakariki Harrison and Mac Bell and tohunga raranga (master weaver) Hinemoa Harrison. The resulting structure, O-Tāwhao Marae, was opened on 26 April 1985 and is still used to introduce students to te ao Māori (the world of Māori). Although the project encountered resistance at the time, O-Tāwhao is now recognised as a valuable resource for the college and Te Awamutu community.

In 1984, Mr Wetere led a project to create the Waipā Kōkiri Arts Centre. The centre would provide further educational opportunities for the students who were involved in the O-Tāwhao Marae project and engage others in the community who had no qualifications. The aim was to provide these people with a future beyond the unemployment queues. Although some government funding was available, further fundraising and, in some cases, personal loans from founders were needed to complete the centre. On completion of the centre, new government funding became available that enabled the Waipā Kōkiri Arts Centre to expand its programme portfolio. Office administration, computer technology studies and trades training programmes in building and plumbing were added to the whakairo (carving), raranga (weaving) and Te Reo Māori programmes already running. The centre also became involved in community projects, including renovating marae throughout the country and producing carving and weaving to adorn these buildings.

During the 1980s, a time of high unemployment in New Zealand, the kaupapa (philosophy) of the Waipā Kōkiri Arts Centre was to increase Māori participation in tertiary training by taking education to the people, particularly those without qualifications. With travel being a major barrier for many, the founders began opening campuses in other areas, including Te Kūiti, Hamilton and Manukau.

In 1987, Buck Nin, a leading New Zealand educationalist and artist, and Mr Wetere advanced the concept of creating a tertiary education institute, or wānanga. Dr Nin believed that, by gaining tertiary status, Aotearoa Institute would earn recognition for its qualifications throughout New Zealand and the world. In 1988, the pair submitted an application to the Ministry of Education and the following year the government changed the Education Act to open the way for recognition of wānanga as tertiary education institutions. The same year (1989), Waipā Kōkiri Arts Centre changed its name to Aotearoa Institute and shortly afterwards became the first registered private training establishment (under NZQA) in the country.

The Aotearoa Institute lobbied government for a further five years before being granted tertiary status in 1993. This gave the organisation statutory recognition as a wānanga and placed it alongside universities, polytechnics and teachers' training colleges. In 1994, Aotearoa Institute changed its name to Te Wānanga o Aotearoa to reflect this change in status.

Te Wānanga o Aotearoa experienced growth during the early 2000s (growing from 3,127 students in 2000 to 66,756 students in 2004) and quickly became one of the largest tertiary education institutions in the country. However, there were challenges associated with this rapid expansion. The organisation's internal processes struggled to keep pace with the demand for learning.

In 2005, the government appointed a group of Crown managers to help consolidate the organisation and implement systems and processes befitting a nationwide institution. This work included a nationwide restructure, reorganisation of the executive level, and a curriculum review. Since then, Te Wānanga o Aotearoa has re-established itself as a leading provider of Māori education in New Zealand and has become a model for overseas organisations.

== Wānanga in tertiary education ==
In traditional times, whare wānanga were houses of higher learning dedicated to perpetuating knowledge. Attendance at whare wānanga was a privilege, with stringent selection processes ensuring that only the most capable students were chosen to receive the knowledge that was to be shared. In the modern context, wānanga retain their status as places of higher learning, alongside universities and polytechnics as recognised tertiary institutions in New Zealand.

Te Wānanga o Aotearoa is one of three wānanga that have been given statutory recognition in New Zealand. The three wānanga are represented by the collective national association Te Tauihu o Ngā Wānanga.

Te Wānanga o Aotearoa expresses āhuatanga Māori through its guiding principles, tikanga, staff actions, and programmes. Although operating within te ao Māori (the Māori sphere), Te Wānanga o Aotearoa welcomes all New Zealanders.

== Curriculum ==
Te Wānanga o Aotearoa delivers programmes from certificate through to masters level. Its programme portfolio has been developed over time in consultation with iwi, industry, community and students. Te Wānanga o Aotearoa considers feedback from these groups, the objectives of the Government's Tertiary Education Strategy, organisational objectives and constraints.

A key objective is to remove barriers to tertiary education, including economic, geographical, family and work commitments, and previous negative experiences. To achieve this, Te Wānanga o Aotearoa minimises fees, maximises programme options and locations, offers flexible learning hours and provides student support. The resulting programme mix balances these objectives.

== Student demographics and achievement ==
In 2010, 35,991 students studied at Te Wānanga o Aotearoa. Of these, 18,020 (50.1%) indicated Māori whakapapa and 3,702 (10.3%) indicated Pasifika origins. Sixty-eight per cent of students were women and 52% were over 40.

Thirty-eight per cent of enrolling students in 2010 had no qualifications and 30% were unemployed. Student satisfaction was high in 2010, with 91% satisfied with their tutor and 90% satisfied with their learning environment. Satisfaction was also high with learning resources, programmes, and facilities.

In 2010, Te Wānanga o Aotearoa's overall programme graduation rate was 70%, with course completion and retention rates of 78% and 81% respectively.

== Initiatives ==
=== Mātātahi Mataora ===
Te Wānanga o Aotearoa has increasingly catered to mature students as its reputation for inclusive adult education has grown. While continuing this commitment, the organisation is also focusing on youth.

In response to high youth unemployment, Te Wānanga o Aotearoa introduced youth initiatives to ease the transition from secondary to tertiary education. These include full-time youth learning facilities and day courses for those in mainstream secondary schools.

=== Open Wānanga ===
Open Wānanga, formerly a subsidiary, provided home-based learning. Popular subjects included Māori history and knowledge and English language. It was reintegrated into Te Wānanga o Aotearoa in 2015.
