= David Proctor (admiral) =

New Zealand naval officer (born 1968/1969)

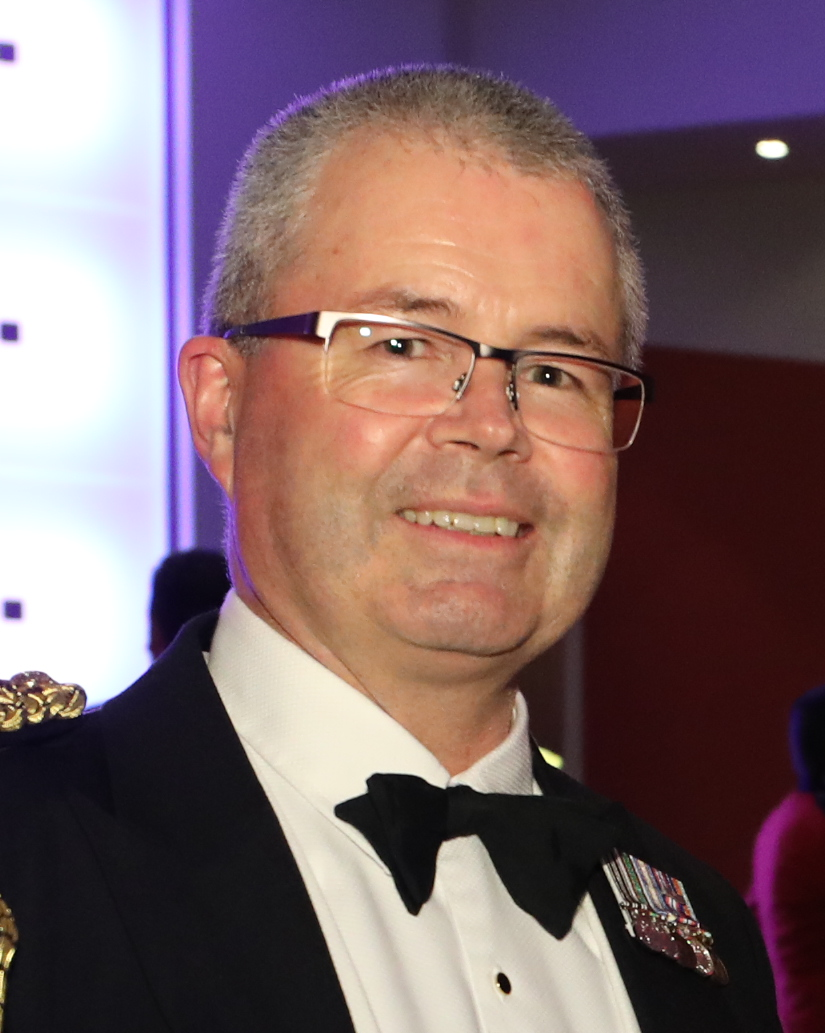
- Proctor in 2019
- Born: David Colin Proctor; 1968 or 1969 (age 57–58); Napier, New Zealand
- Military career
- Allegiance: New Zealand
- Branch: Royal New Zealand Navy
- Service years: 1987–2024
- Rank: Rear Admiral
- Commands: Chief of Navy (2018–2024)
- Conflicts: United Nations Mission of Support to East Timor
- Awards: Officer of the New Zealand Order of Merit

Rear Admiral David Colin Proctor ONZM (born 1968 or 1969) is a retired officer in the Royal New Zealand Navy. He served as Chief of Navy from 2018 to 2024.

== Early life ==
Born in Napier in 1968 or 1969, Proctor grew up in the suburb of Maraenui. He was educated at Colenso High School, where he was head boy in 1986. Of Māori descent, Proctor affiliates to Ngāti Korokī Kahukura.

== Career ==
After leaving school, Proctor joined the Royal New Zealand Navy (RNZN) in January 1987 as a midshipman. Deployments to the Solomon Islands and Timor-Leste followed. He spent most of his naval career in logistics roles.

Proctor succeeded John Martin as Chief of Navy on 29 November 2018. He was the first person with a logistics background to hold this position; all previous heads of the RNZN were from a warfare officer background. Proctor's tenure as Chief of Navy included the delivery of two new ships to the RNZN, the eruption of Whakaari / White Island in 2019 and the response to Cyclone Gabrielle in 2023.

Proctor retired as Chief of Navy on 16 May 2024, and became the deputy executive director at the Australian Civil Military Centre in Canberra.

== Honours and awards ==
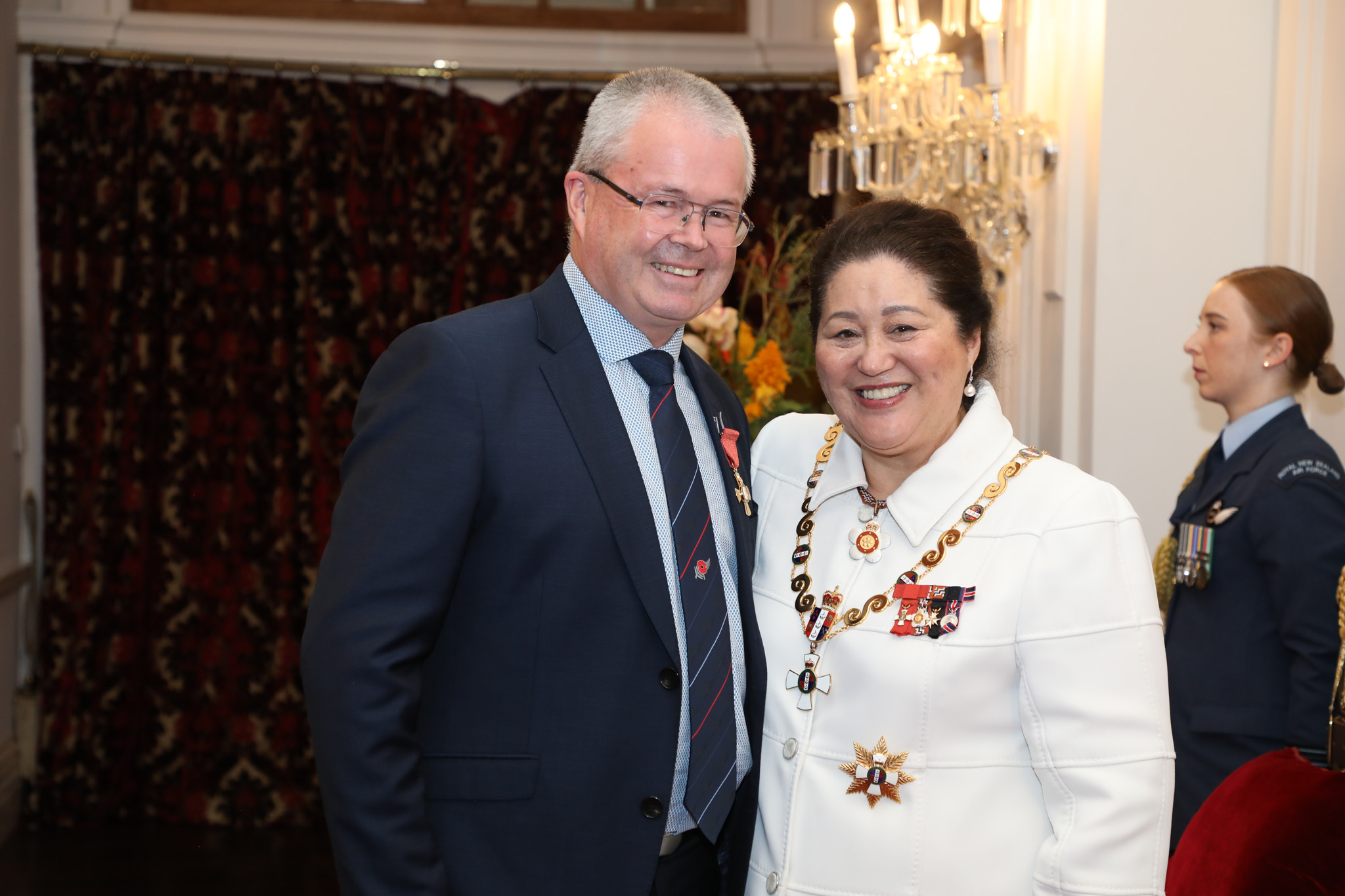
Proctor (left), after his investiture as an Officer of the New Zealand Order of Merit by the governor-general, Dame Cindy Kiro, at Government House, Wellington, on 30 April 2025

In the 2025 New Year Honours, Proctor was appointed an Officer of the New Zealand Order of Merit, for services to the New Zealand Defence Force.

Military offices
Preceded by Rear Admiral John Martin	Chief of Navy; 2018–2024	Succeeded by Garin Golding
