= Ephra Garrett =

New Zealand social work and women's studies academic (1923–2008)

Ephra Garrett QSM
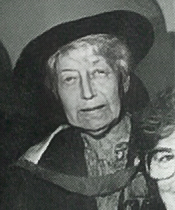
- Born: 20 September 1923; Carterton
- Died: 3 April 2008
- Awards: Queen's Service Medal, honorary doctor of Massey University

Academic background
- Education: Massey University
- Thesis: An exploratory study of the concept of a healthy family (1970)

Academic work
- Doctoral students: Robyn Munford

Ephra Mary Garrett QSM (20 September 1923 – 3 April 2008) was a New Zealand social work and women's studies academic. She was the first Māori woman appointed to the faculty at Massey University. Garrett was awarded an honorary doctorate by Massey University in 1993, and in the 1997 New Year Honours she was awarded the Queen's Service Medal.

== Early life and education ==
Garrett was born in 1923 in Carterton, and affiliated to Te Atiawa and Ngati Mutunga. She grew up in a bicultural home in the Hawke's Bay region of New Zealand, and attended Waipawa High School (now Central Hawke's Bay College). Garrett trained as a teacher at Wellington Teacher's College and then taught in rural schools. She joined the Department of Māori Affairs in 1952, where she was the Māori Welfare Officer for Ikaroa District. Garrett then completed a Bachelor of Arts in psychology and worked with the psychology services in Palmerston North and as an educational psychologist in the United Kingdom.

== Academic career ==
Garrett was appointed to the faculty of Massey University in 1968, and completed a Master of Arts titled An exploratory study of the concept of a healthy family there in 1970. Garrett was the first Māori woman appointed to the university's faculty. With Merv Hancock, she developed the Bachelor of Social Work, a four-year degree programme launched in 1976. Garrett became a founding member of the Social Work Unit within the Department of Sociology. Garrett launched the first women's studies papers two years later. At the 1962 Social Workers’ Study Conference in Dunedin, Garrett called for a code of ethics for social workers.

== Honours and awards ==
In the 1997 New Years Honours Garrett was awarded a Queen's Service Medal. She was awarded an Honorary doctorate from Massey in 1993.

The Centre for Indigenous Psychologies at Massey offers the Whāea Ephra Garrett award in Garrett's memory.

== Personal life ==
Garrett was married to Denny Garrett in August 1945, and they had two children, and also fostered children.
