= Molly Atkinson =

New Zealand singer and teacher (1909–2008)

Molly Atkinson ONZM
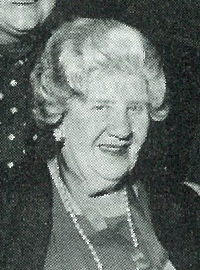
- Atkinson in 1993
- Born: Jane Mary Atkinson; 30 January 1909; Te Awamutu, New Zealand
- Died: 21 February 2008 (aged 99); Palmerston North, New Zealand
- Awards: Massey Medal (1993)

Academic background
- Academic advisor: Astra Desmond

Academic work
- Institutions: Massey University

Jane Mary "Molly" Atkinson ONZM (30 January 1909 – 21 February 2008) was a New Zealand singer and singing teacher. She was one of the first professional full-time classical singers in New Zealand. In 1996, she was appointed an Officer of the New Zealand Order of Merit, for services to music.

== Early life and education ==
Atkinson was born in Te Awamutu on 30 January 1909, of Yorkshire heritage. She was an only child, and her father Karl Atkinson was a journalist, who was involved in setting up a national broadcasting service. Atkinson's parents were both musical. She was taught by Mamie Towsey (also known as Mary Cooper, died 1949), and was a member of the St Mary's Cathedral Choir in Auckland. One of Atkinson's students was bass-baritone Donald Macintyre.

== Career ==
Atkinson sang across New Zealand from 1929 until 1957. Her debut was as a contralto soloist was in Auckland in 1929, singing Rossini's Stabat Mater. Her performances of Bach's Mass in B Minor, St Matthew Passion and Elgar's The Apostles were described as acclaimed. She retired as a performer in 1957 and spent one or two years in England, where she listened to performances and took lessons from Astra Desmond. Returning to New Zealand in 1960, Atkinson took a lecturing position at Victoria University of Wellington and then at Massey University. She retired from the university in 1974.

Atkinson was the founder of the Manawatu Women's Choral Festival, and was the patron of the Palmerston North Choral Society. Atkinson was president of the Music Teachers' Registration Board, and during her term she advocated for higher pay for music teachers, resulting in a change to legislation.

Atkinson adjudicated for many singing competitions, among them the Mobil Song Quest, and she was part of the judging panel in the years that Malvina Major and Kiri Te Kanawa won.

Atkinson established the Molly Atkinson Trust to support young musicians. She died in Palmerston North on 21 February 2008 aged 99. Her funeral was held at St Peter's Anglican Church in Palmerston North, and the Palmerston North Choral Society and the Renaissance Singers performed.

== Honours and awards ==
In 1993 Atkinson was awarded a Massey Medal by Massey University, alongside Win Rockell, in recognition of her service to music education in the community. In the 1996 Queen's Birthday Honours, Atkinson was appointed an Officer of the New Zealand Order of Merit for services to music. Atkinson also was awarded Honorary Life Membership of the Institute of Registered Music Teachers of New Zealand, and of Chamber Music New Zealand.
