= Douglas Armstrong (politician) =

New Zealand engineer and local politician

Douglas Keith Armstrong QSO (born 1941 or 1942) is a former city councillor on the Auckland City Council, New Zealand for the Citizens & Ratepayers ticket. Since 2013, he has been a member of Auckland District Health Board (ADHB).

== Career ==
Armstrong was born in 1941 or 1942. He grew up in the Auckland suburb of Kohimarama and attended Auckland Grammar School. He was trained as a civil engineer (he holds a Bachelor of Engineering (civil)) and is a past president of the Institution of Professional Engineers New Zealand (1995–1996; now Engineering New Zealand Te Ao Rangahau) and former member of the Prime Minister's Enterprise Council. When consultancy work dried up, he turned to teaching at Auckland Technical Institute and rose through the administrative ranks until he became chief executive officer of Unitec, one of Auckland's polytechnical institutes. He retired from Unitec in 1999.

Armstrong was first elected onto Auckland City Council in 2001 for the Citizens & Ratepayers ticket, and served as the chairman of finance at Auckland City from 2001 to 2004 and from 2007 onwards. He was also the deputy leader of the Citizens & Ratepayers ticket from October 2004, serving under the leadership of David Hay.

In October 2010 Armstrong unsuccessfully stood as a Citizens & Ratepayers candidate on the Ōrākei ward of the new Auckland Council: he was defeated by Cameron Brewer, an independent.

In the 2013 Auckland local elections, Armstrong successfully contested a position on the Auckland District Health Board (ADHB). He has been a member of ADHB since.

== Awards and community support ==
In the 1996 Queen's Birthday Honours, Armstrong was appointed a Companion of the Queen's Service Order for public services. He is also a trustee of the Sir Woolf Fisher Trust for excellence in education.

== Private life ==
Since 1976, Armstrong has lived at Karaka Bay. He owns a bach on Rakino Island.
