= Lois Daish =

New Zealand restaurateur, food writer and cookbook author

Lois Dorothy Daish MNZM is a New Zealand restaurateur, food writer, cookbook author and contributor to Radio New Zealand and Newstalk ZB. She is also a judge of food and restaurant awards and is a food commentator.

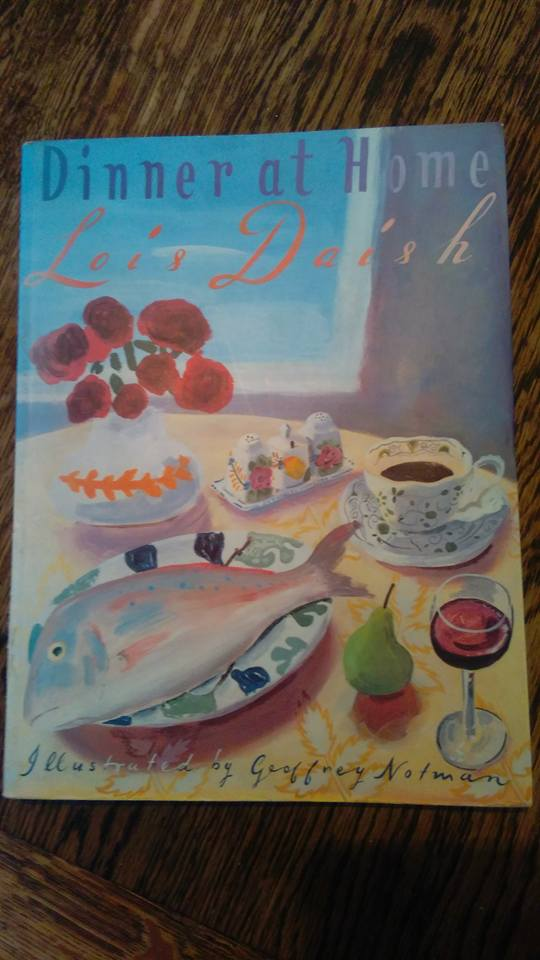
Dinner at Home (1993) by Lois Daish

== Biography ==
Daish was born in Gisborne, and grew up in the Wellington suburb of Roseneath. While young, her family moved to New York for two years as her father had a job at the United Nations. This early exposure to American food influenced her interest and taste in food in later years.

In the 1960s, Daish cooked at the Downstage Theatre, and later worked at a bohemian cafe, The Settlement.

In the 1970s, Daish wrote articles for a friend's newspaper in the western suburbs of Wellington; most were on town planning issues, but Daish convinced her friend to include a food column and she wrote food articles for the newspaper as well.

In the 1980s, Daish owned several Wellington restaurants: Number 9 on Bowen St for four years, followed by the Mount Cook Café from 1984 to 1989, and then the Brooklyn Café & Grill. In 1984 she began writing a food column for the New Zealand Listener magazine. For the first ten years she wrote alternate weeks with Annabel Langbein, and from 1994 she wrote the column every week. She retired from the Listener in 2009. In 1987, she was a founding member of the New Zealand Guild of Food Writers.

== Publications ==
- Good Food: Recipes from the Listener (1989), ISBN 9780908833016
- Dinner at Home (1993), co-written with Geoffrey Notman, Bridget Williams Books, ISBN 9780908912452
- Fuss-Free Food for Two (1997), ISBN 9780908808809
- A Good Year (2005), Random House New Zealand, ISBN 9781869416904

== Honours and awards ==
In the 1997 New Year Honours, Daish was appointed a Member of the New Zealand Order of Merit, for services to the food industry. In 2010, she was elected a life member of the New Zealand Guild of Food Writers.
