= Margaret di Menna =

New Zealand microbiologist

Margaret di Menna ONZM
- Born: Margaret Elaine di Menna; 8 July 1923; Huddersfield, Yorkshire, England
- Died: 24 March 2014 (aged 90); Hamilton, New Zealand
- Education: University of Otago
- Scientific career
- Fields: Microbiology
- Thesis: Yeasts of the human body, their nature and relationship (1954)

Margaret Elaine di Menna ONZM (8 July 1923 – 24 March 2014) was a New Zealand microbiologist. In 1954 she became the first woman to gain a Doctor of Philosophy degree from a New Zealand university. Her doctoral thesis at the University of Otago was entitled Yeasts of the human body, their nature and relationship. She had previously graduated with a MSc(Hons) from the same institution in 1948.

In 1990, di Menna was awarded the New Zealand 1990 Commemoration Medal, and in the 1997 New Year Honours, she was appointed an Officer of the New Zealand Order of Merit, for services to microbiology. In 2011, the reading room at Abbey College at the University of Otago was named in her honour. She was a prominent member of Zonta International.

She died in Hamilton in 2014.
