= Rongo Wetere =

New Zealand chief executive

Rongo Herehere Wetere ONZM of Ngāti Maniapoto descent, founder of the Te Wananga o Aotearoa (TWoA) tertiary institution in New Zealand and an Officer of the Order of New Zealand of Merit. He was previously chair of the Māori Employment and Training Commission. He was the founder and chief executive of the Te Wananga o Aotearoa tertiary institution from 1984 to 2005, the largest post-secondary education institution in New Zealand and the largest Indigenous University in the world.

In 2025, he was awarded a King Charles III coronation medal by the New Zealand High Commission of Canada and the Senate of Canada for his lifelong service for Indigenous culture and language in Canada.

In 1994, Dr. Wetere successfully gained government approval for the establishment of New Zealand's first Maori University known as Te Wananga o Aotearoa (translation: University of New Zealand) and became its founding President/CEO. Within 10 years, Te Wananga o Aotearoa (TWOA) grew to be the largest tertiary education provider in New Zealand with annual enrollments reaching 65,000 students. TWOA also allowed the enrollment of non-Maori people with 52% of its student body being non-Maori.

In 1998 Dr Wetere sued the New Zealand government over inequitable funding for Wananga (Maori universities). Eventually the three Maori Wananga received $150M capital funding from this action and an apology from the government for its refusal to provide funding. When enrollments jumped to 65,000 in the following year, New Zealand universities facing declining rolls sought government action to restrict TWOA. During a heated national election, political parties challenged the government for having allowed the TWOA to grow so large. At the resignation of Dr. Wetere in December 2005, the former Minister of Education and then Chair of the Tertiary Funding Commission (TEC), the Honourable Russell Marshall stated, “Dr. Wetere had made an enormous contribution to education in New Zealand and was deserving of the highest accolades the country could bestow."

He was also a key driver in the establishment of WINHEC (World Indigenous Nations Higher Education Consortium) in Banff in 2002, where he was appointed co-chair. WINHEC groups all the Indigenous universities around the pacific rim for the sharing of ideas as well as certification and establishment of standards.

Dr Wetere resigned from his post of CEO of Te Wananga o Aotearoa in 2005 following government pressure. A subsequent report by the Office of the Auditor-General found that the finances of the TWoA were in order.

Wetere currently works as managing director of ArrowMight Canada, an adult literacy and lifelong learning provider that targets Immigrants and Aboriginal learners.

In the 1996 Queen's Birthday Honours, Wetere was appointed an Officer of the New Zealand Order of Merit, for services to the community.

== Personal life ==
Wetere has three children and is married to Marcia Krawll. He resides in Ottawa, Ontario, Canada.
