= 1996 Special Honours (New Zealand) =

Awards list for New Zealand

- Previous: 1996 New Year Honours; Next: 1997 New Year Honours
- Type: New Zealand royal honours: Queen's Service Order; New Zealand Order of Merit
- Date: 29 February 1996; 23 September 1996
- Country: New Zealand

Highlights
- Total recipients: 3

The 1996 Special Honours in New Zealand were two Special Honours Lists, published on 29 February and 23 September 1996, recognising the outgoing governor-general, and appointing officials within the New Zealand Order of Merit.

== Companion of the Queen's Service Order (QSO) ==
=== Additional, for public services ===
- Her Excellency Dame Catherine Anne Tizard GCMG GCVO DBE – Principal Companion of the Queen's Service Order and Governor-General and Commander-in-Chief in and over New Zealand since 1990.
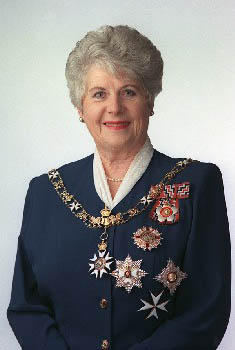
Dame Cath Tizard

== New Zealand Order of Merit ==
=== Appointment of officials ===
- Janet Marie Warren Shroff CVO. To be Secretary and Registrar of the New Zealand Order of Merit.
- Phillippe Patrick O’Shea LVO – New Zealand Herald of Arms Extraordinary. To be Herald of the New Zealand Order of Merit.
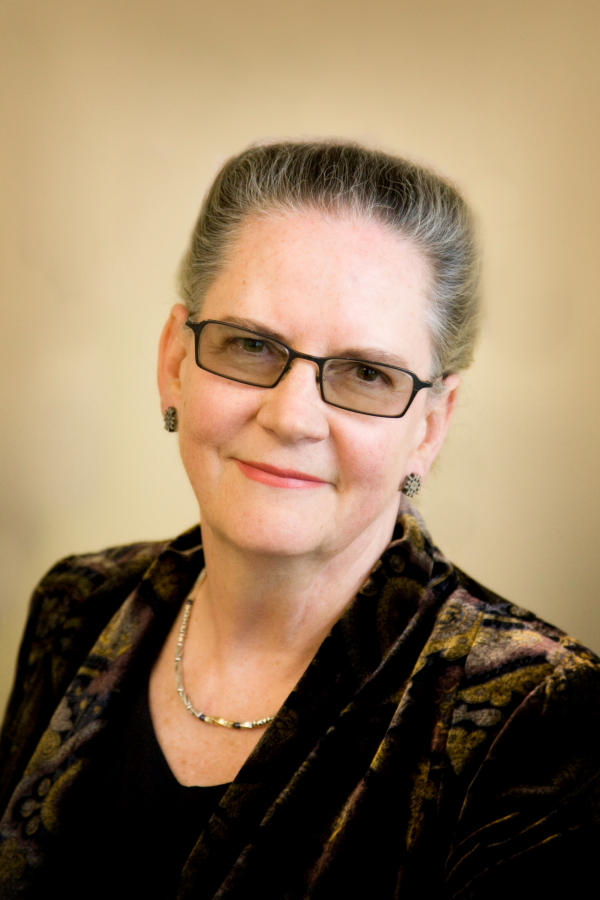
Marie Shroff

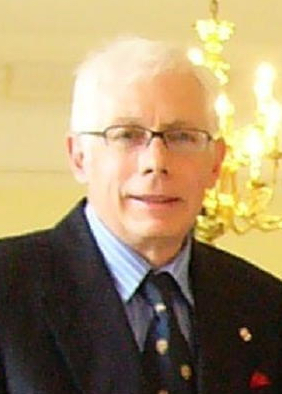
Phillip O'Shea
