= Wānanga =

Type of education institution in New Zealand

In the education system of New Zealand, a wānanga is a publicly-owned tertiary institution or Māori university that provides education in a Māori cultural context. Section 162 of the New Zealand Education Act of 1989 specifies that wānanga resemble mainstream universities in many ways but expects them to be:

... characterised by teaching and research that maintains, advances, and disseminates knowledge and develops intellectual independence, and assists the application of knowledge regarding āhuatanga Māori (Māori tradition) according to tikanga Māori (Māori custom).

Wānanga educational programmes, accredited through the New Zealand Qualifications Authority (NZQA) and through the Ministry of Education, are partly governed by New Zealand's Tertiary Education Commission (TEC). Wānanga offer certificates, diplomas, and bachelor-level degrees, with some wānanga providing programmes in specialised areas up to doctorate level.

Outside the 21st-century formal education system, the word wānanga in the Māori language traditionally conveys meanings related to highly evolved knowledge, lore, occult arts, and also "forum" – in the sense of a discussion to arrive at deeper understanding.

The Education and Training Act 2020 underwent proposed amendments to better recognise the role of wānanga in New Zealand’s tertiary education system. These changes focused on providing a new framework for the country’s three current wānanga: Te Wānanga o Aotearoa, Te Wānanga o Raukawa, and Te Whare Wānanga Awanuiārangi.

The term "Whare Wānanga" is also widely used in the Māori names of New Zealand universities (e.g., Te Whare Wānanga o Waikato/University of Waikato).

== Recognised wānanga ==
There are three official wānanga:

- Te Wānanga o Aotearoa, founded in 1984, operating nationwide and headquartered in Te Awamutu
- Te Wānanga o Raukawa, founded in 1981 and based in Ōtaki
- Te Whare Wānanga o Awanuiārangi, founded in 1991 and based in Whakatāne

== See also ==
- Tribal colleges and universities, United States
