= List of honorary doctors of Massey University =

The list of Honorary Doctors of Massey University below shows the recipients of honorary doctorates conferred by Massey University since 1962.

| Year | Recipient | Degree |
|---|---|---|
| 1964 | Walter Dyer | DSc |
| 1964 | George Petersen | DLit |
| 1964 | Norman Taylor | DSc |
| 1966 | Francis Dry | DSc |
| 1966 | Mac McMeekan | DSc |
| 1968 | Alan Candy | DSc |
| 1968 | Jack Filmer | DSc |
| 1971 | Bill Hamilton | DSc |
| 1971 | Blair Tennent | DSc |
| 1972 | Mac Cooper | DSc |
| 1972 | John Ormond | DSc |
| 1976 | Amy Hodgson | DSc |
| 1977 | Laurie Friis | DSc |
| 1977 | Les Gandar | DSc |
| 1977 | Eric Ojala | DSc |
| 1977 | Geoffrey Peren | DSc |
| 1979 | Lou Fitch | DSc |
| 1981 | Brian Talboys | DSc |
| 1982 | Alan Hellaby | DSc |
| 1984 | Alan Stewart | DSc |
| 1985 | Alan Johns | DSc |
| 1986 | Lindsay Wallace | DSc |
| 1988 | Lauris Edmond | DLit |
| 1988 | Bill Pryor | DSc |
| 1989 | Cliff Irvine | DSc |
| 1990 | Jim Graham | DSc |
| 1990 | Tukawekai Kereama | DLit |
| 1991 | Doug Easton | DSc |
| 1991 | Bob Lockwood | DSc |
| 1991 | Roger Peren | DLit |
| 1991 | Arthur Ward | DSc |
| 1992 | Roy McKenzie | DLit |
| 1992 | Don Merton | DSc |
| 1993 | Joy Cowley | DLit |
| 1993 | Ephra Garrett | DLit |
| 1993 | Bok Yong Kim | DSc |
| 1993 | Malvina Major | DLit |
| 1993 | Campbell Reid | DSc |
| 1993 | Rod Weir | DSc |
| 1994 | Joan Dingley | DSc |
| 1994 | Brian Elwood | DLit |
| 1994 | Joan Wiffen | DSc |
| 1995 | David Levene | DLit |
| 1995 | Philip Yates | DSc |
| 1996 | Kevin Low | DSc |
| 1996 | Sam McGredy | DSc |
| 1996 | Neil Waters | DSc |
| 1996 | Cliff Whiting | DLit |
| 1996 | John Williams | DCom |
| 1997 | Jane Hunter | DSc |
| 1998 | Hugh Williams | DLit |
| 1999 | Garfield Johnson | DLit |
| 1999 | Peter Blake | DLit |
| 1999 | Michael Houstoun | DLit |
| 1999 | Eddie Durie | DLit |
| 1999 | Dick Hubbard | DSc |
| 2000 | Kevin Ireland | DLit |
| 2000 | Piers Reid | DLit |
| 2000 | Stuart McIntyre | DCom |
| 2000 | W. H. Oliver | DLit |
| 2000 | Dryden Spring | DSc |
| 2000 | Pat Goodman | DSc |
| 2001 | Geoff Page | DSc |
| 2001 | Ian Warrington | DLit |
| 2002 | Stephen Tindall | DCom |
| 2002 | Don Selwyn | DLit |
| 2002 | Alan Frampton | DSc |
| 2002 | Tom Scott | DLit |
| 2002 | Jim Bolger | DLit |
| 2002 | John Drawbridge | DLit |
| 2002 | Bhumibol Adulyadej | DSc |
| 2002 | Peter Hubscher | DSc |
| 2003 | C. Wayne McIlwraith | DSc |
| 2003 | John Telfer Reid | DSc |
| 2003 | Jock Macmillan | DSc |
| 2003 | Morva Croxson | DLit |
| 2003 | Kate Coolahan | DLit |
| 2004 | Ian Watson | DSc |
| 2004 | Warren Larsen | DSc |
| 2004 | James McWha | DSc |
| 2005 | Elwyn Richardson | DLit |
| 2005 | Jim Bull | DSc |
| 2005 | Susan Baragwanath | DLit |
| 2005 | Rodger Fox | DMus |
| 2006 | Geoff Baylis | DLit |
| 2006 | John Dunmore | DLit |
| 2007 | Paul Dibble | DFA |
| 2007 | Peter Snell | DSc |
| 2007 | Tumu Te Heuheu | DLit |
| 2008 | Margaret Bazley | DLit |
| 2008 | Grant Davidson | DSc |
| 2008 | David Russell | DCom |
| 2009 | Alison Paterson | DCom |
| 2009 | Tūroa Royal | DLit |
| 2009 | Don Turner | DSc |
| 2010 | Bronwyn Monopoli | DCom |
| 2010 | Nigel Gould | DCom |
| 2010 | Don Bewley | DLit |
| 2010 | Paul Callaghan | DSc |
| 2010 | Peter McLeavey | DFA |
| 2011 | Jerry Mateparae | DLit |
| 2011 | Kate Sylvester | DFA |
| 2011 | Richard Taylor | DFA |
| 2011 | Ian Templeton | DLit |
| 2012 | Rom Harré | DLit |
| 2012 | Ivan Snook | DLit |
| 2012 | Alan Bollard | DCom |
| 2012 | Mervyn Hancock | DLit |
| 2013 | Don McLaren | DSc |
| 2014 | Geoff Murphy | DLit |
| 2014 | Suzie Moncrieff | DFA |
| 2014 | Peng Liyuan | DLit |
| 2015 | Dhanin Chearavanont | DSc |
| 2015 | Gerald Hensley | DLit |
| 2015 | David Moxon | DLit |
| 2015 | Ans Westra | DFA |
| 2016 | Russ Ballard | DSc |
| 2016 | Diana Goodman | DLit |
| 2016 | Dick Scott | DLit |
| 2017 | Kim Workman | DLit |
| 2018 | Sandy Adsett | DFA |
| 2018 | Mary Earle | DSc |
| 2018 | Dick Earle | DSc |
| 2018 | Alex Chu | DSc |
| 2018 | Mason Durie | DH |
| 2019 | Wendy Pye | DEd |
| 2019 | Merrill J. Fernando | DSc |
| 2019 | Michael Ross | DSc |
| 2019 | Jill White | DLit |
| 2020 | Manahi Paewai | DEd |
| 2022 | Karl Pulotu-Endemann | DH |
| 2022 | Bali Haque | DEd |
| 2022 | Cindy Kiro | DH |
| 2022 | Steve Maharey | DLit |
