= Merrill J. Fernando =

Sri Lankan businessman (1930–2023)

Deshamanya Merrill J. Fernando
- මෙරිල් ප්‍රනාන්දු
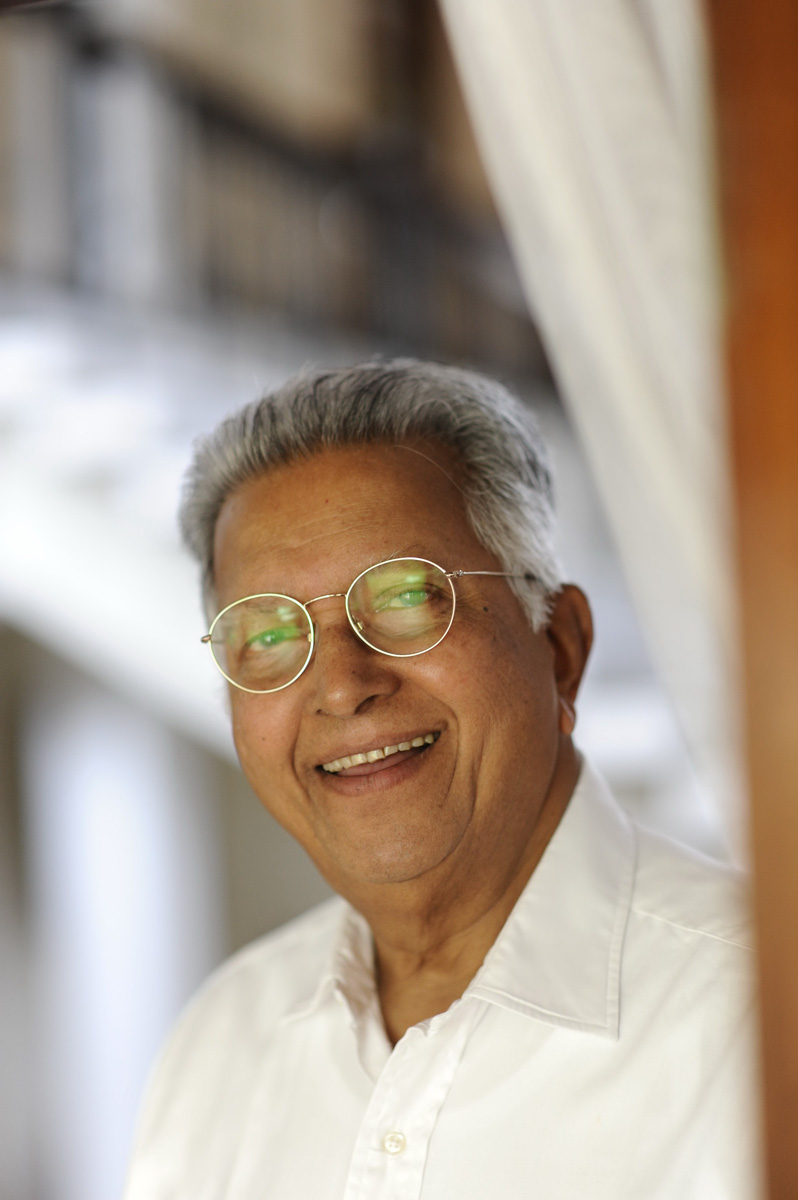
- Born: Merrill Joseph Fernando; 6 May 1930; Negombo, British Ceylon
- Died: 20 July 2023 (aged 93); Colombo, Sri Lanka
- Education: Maris Stella College; St. Joseph's College, Colombo
- Alma mater: Massey University (Sc.D) (honorary)
- Years active: 1950s–2023
- Known for: Founder of Dilmah
- Children: Dilhan Fernando Malik Fernando
- Awards: Business for Peace Award (2015); Global Businessman Award (2016); Award for Responsible Capitalism (2016)
- Website: www.dilmahtea.com

Deshamanya Merrill Joseph Fernando (6 May 1930 – 20 July 2023) was a Sri Lankan businessman who was the founder and chairman of the Ceylon tea company Dilmah. He was known for promoting single-origin tea in the international market, and for conducting his business using the principles of social responsibility.

== Early life and education ==
Merrill Joseph Fernando was born into a Catholic family 6 May 1930 in the village of Pallansena, near Kochchikade, in Negombo, British Ceylon, a village north of Colombo, the capital of Sri Lanka. After beginning at the Pallansena village school, then St Mary's in Negombo, he moved to Colombo, attending Maris Stella College and then St Joseph's College.

He also studied for four years to be a priest, at the St. Aloysius seminary in Borella, but was eventually rejected by the brothers there as a candidate.

He then went to London to train as a tea taster at Mincing Lane. While there, he noticed that tea was being mixed and blended but still marketed as pure Ceylon tea. The tea was bought cheaply, with branding and packaging taking place in Europe and the UK, returning small profits to Sri Lankan tea producers while middlemen (wholesalers and resellers, mainly a few large corporations) reaped the lion's share of the profits.

== Career ==
Fernando started his career in tea when he was just 20 years old as a tea assistant with A. F. Jones and Company, (Note: The company, which was founded in 1912, still exists, branded Jones Tea.) a tea exporting company run by Arthur Frederick Jones and his sons Dennis and Alan Jones, where he was appointed managing director in 1954. In the mid-1950s, the company was in the business of selling tea in bulk to international companies for blending and reselling. Fernando is credited with changing the focus of the company from its Anglocentric market to new markets such as Japan and the USSR. In 1956, when a change in government looked to seize control of some foreign-owned estates, the Jones family left the country, and Fernando acquired their estates via a consortium. In 1962 Fernando established Ceylon Tea Services Company and Merrill J. Fernando Company, which exported loose tea to several countries, including North America and Australasia.

Fernando bought his first few tea estates in the 1970s. After the nationalisation of the plantations in 1971–72, Fernando stepped down to start MJF Exports, and within a few years most Australian retailers sourced their house brands from MJF.

In 1982, Fernando established Ceylon Tea Services Ltd, which became one of the first companies listed as a public company on the Colombo Stock Exchange. In the mid-1980s, he started negotiations with the Australian supermarket retailer Coles, eventually persuading them to stock his tea. He founded Dilmah in 1985, by introducing single-origin tea as competition to blended commodity tea. The tea started with exports to Australia and New Zealand, and in the 1990s to Europe and North America. In 2013, Australia made up 10 percent of Dilmah's global annual retail sales. As of 2016, Dilmah tea was sold in over 100 countries.

Fernando stood down as CEO of Dilmah in 2019 and was succeeded by his son Dilhan Fernando.

== Charitable works ==
In 2007, Fernando founded Dilmah Conservation, "to incorporate environmental and wildlife conservation efforts into the work of the MJF Foundation, which primarily focuses on social justice". One of its main aims was to protect Sri Lankan forests. The MJF charitable foundation uses 15% of the pre-tax profits of Dilmah and related companies to provide nutritional, educational, and other support to disabled children, the elderly, and youth in marginalised communities. It has also supported Indigenous Indian tribes adjust to the 21st century, and survivors of the 2004 tsunami.

== Recognition ==
In 2015, Fernando was honoured by an Oslo Business for Peace award.

In 2016, he was chosen as Sri Lankan of the Year and in the same year he was awarded the FIRST Award for Responsible Capitalism for improving the lives of underprivileged children and deprived communities.

Dilmah was recognised by brand think tank Medinge Group as a Brand with a Conscience.

In 2018, Fernando received a Lifetime Achievement Award from the World Association of Chefs' Societies.

In August 2019, Dilmah's founder was honoured with the second highest Sri Lankan national award, having the title of "Deshamanya" bestowed upon him.

In November 2019, Fernando was awarded an honorary doctorate (Doctor of Science) by Massey University in New Zealand, "in recognition of his leadership in ethical business within the food and beverage industry". He had had an association with the university since the late 1990s, when he worked with Distinguished Professor Paul Moughan at the Riddet Institute.

Upon his death, Hiru News described Fernando as "a legend in the industry".

== Personal life ==
Fernando was married and had two sons, Malik and Dilhan, but split from his wife when their sons were four and two years old respectively, and he brought them up as a single parent.

In May 2023, a biography of Fernando was published, entitled The story of Ceylon Teamaker Merrill J. Fernando; Disruptor, Teamaker, Servant, co-written by Anura Gunasekera, and Fernando.

== In popular culture ==
Fernando became known in New Zealand and Australia for his TV ads in which he urged viewers to "do try it".

== Death and legacy ==
Fernando died in Colombo, Sri Lanka on 20 July 2023, at age 93.

His commitment to maintaining the purity of his product, and educating people about the benefits of drinking single-origin tea, earned him fans around the world, and set a high bar for others in the tea industry.
