= Michael Houstoun =

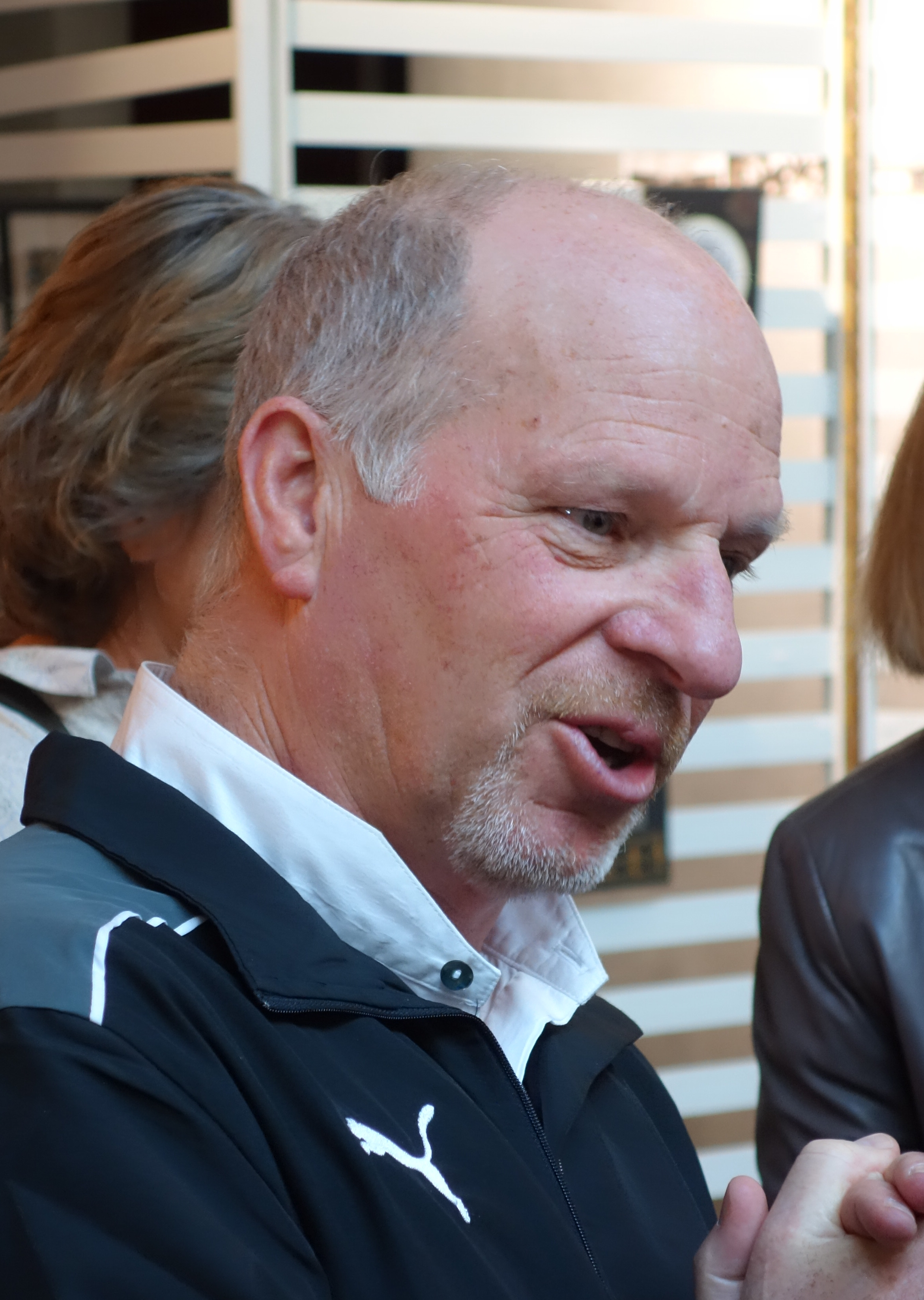
- Michael Houstoun in 2013

Background information
- Born: Michael James Houstoun; 20 October 1952 (age 73); Timaru, New Zealand
- Genres: classical
- Occupation: concert pianist
- Instrument: piano
- Website: www.michaelhoustoun.co.nz

Michael James Houstoun CNZM (born 20 October 1952) is a concert pianist from New Zealand. He has twice in his life performed the complete cycle of Beethoven sonatas and in between these achievements, he overcame focal hand dystonia.

== Early life ==
Houstoun was born in Timaru in 1952. His parents were Archie and Ngaire Houstoun. He received his education at Claremont Primary School and Timaru Boys' High School. Houstoun started playing piano at the age of five and studied under Sister Mary Eulalie in Timaru and, from age 15, Maurice Till in Christchurch.

== Career ==
Having won every New Zealand piano competition and award as a teenager, Houstoun then travelled and entered three major international competitions: Van Cliburn (1973, 3rd place), Leeds (1975, 4th place) and Tchaikovsky (1982, 6th).

From 1974 to 1981, he studied at the Curtis Institute of Music in Philadelphia and London. Houstoun returned to live in New Zealand in 1981; as of 2012 he lived in Feilding. He regularly plays with New Zealand's professional music-ensembles as well as giving solo recitals and recording. Aged 40, he performed and recorded the complete Beethoven-sonata cycle, and collaborated with Tainui Stephens on a television documentary about Franz Liszt entitled Icon in B minor.

In 1987, he launched the Kerikeri competition which became the Kerikeri International Piano Competition in 2012, attracting outstanding pianists and teachers from around the world.

In 1990, Houstoun received the New Zealand 1990 Commemoration Medal.

In 1999, Houstoun received an honorary doctorate in literature from Massey University. Houstoun started suffering from focal hand dystonia, which could easily have ended his career. The condition was treated with physiotherapy and acupuncture, and he had splints made, used rubber bands, and learned braille as sensory retraining, but Houstoun believes that his relaxation technique helped him overcome the condition. In 2001 a documentary was filmed about his condition. After five years he started performing again as a soloist. In the 2012 Queen's Birthday and Diamond Jubilee Honours Houstoun was appointed a Companion of the New Zealand Order of Merit for services as a pianist.

In 2013, he repeated his achievement from 20 years earlier of performing all 32 Beethoven piano-sonatas.
