= Golden Shears =

Sheep shearing event

The Golden Shears International Shearing and Woolhandling Championships is the world's most prestigious sheep shearing event.

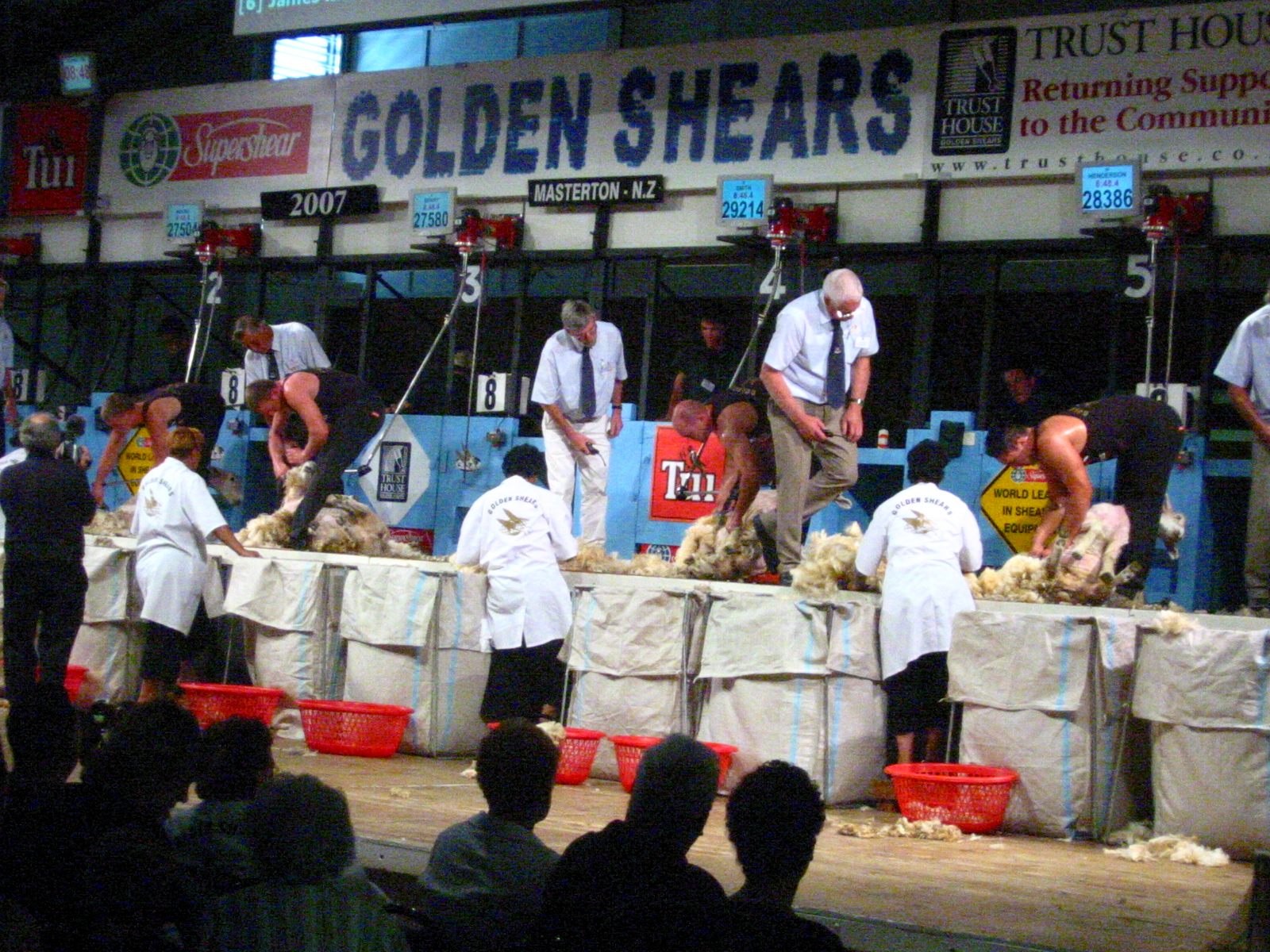
Golden Shears competition 2007

It was founded in Masterton, New Zealand, and been held in the town's War Memorial Stadium each March since 1961. It initially comprised competition in three shearing classes, including the Open championship, which is the most revered of all single shearing titles worldwide. In the final, sometimes referred to as shearing's equivalent of the Wimbledon Open in tennis, six shearers each shear 20 second-shear sheep, for which the fastest time was 15min 27.4sec, shorn in 2003.

But the competition is about more than just the fastest time, and the winner is decided on time and quality penalty points, the winner being the shearer with the lowest score.

Other events have expanded the programme over the years, with competition now held in five shearing classes, four woolhandling classes and three woolpressing classes, along with other events.

The McSkimming Memorial Triple Crown final was added to the programme in 1973, and in various sponsorship guises has become the unofficial New Zealand multiwools national championship. Currently known as the PGG Wrightson National Circuit, it is shorn in five qualifying stages in which points are accrued for shearing finewooled merino sheep, fullwooled strongwool sheep, coarse-wooled Corriedales, lambs and second-shear sheep. In the final, six competitors shear three of each type.

The Golden Shears in Masterton spawned Golden Shears championships in other countries, including the United Kingdom, where a Golden Shears of Great Britain was held at the Royal Bath and West Show, and Australia, which became involved in an annual home-and-away transtasman test series, staged alternately at Masterton, and at Euroa, Vic. Suspended for some years after industrial disturbances in Australia, the Australian legs of the series are now held at differing venues in conjunction with the Australisan national championships.

While machine shearing contests have been held at least since 1902, when an event was held at the Hawke's Bay A and P Show, Hastings, New Zealand, the Golden Shears is credited with the spread of shearing as a world-wide sport, including a Golden Shears World Shearing and Woolhandling Championships, held first in England in 1977. The Golden Shears World championships is a global competition featuring about 30 countries, with Individual and Teams titles in machine shearing, blade shearing and woolhandling. The next World championships are at the Royal Highland Show, Edinburgh, Scotland, on June 22-25, 2023.

Despite the advent of a World Championships every 2–4 years, the Golden Shears in Masterton every year remains the mecca for sheep shearers worldwide, and entries in all classes have in peak years exceeded 600.

New Zealander David Fagan holds the most titles (16), won between 1986 and 2009, including 12 consecutive titles between 1990 and 2001. The championships have been held in Masterton's War Memorial Stadium each March for 60 years consecutively, but were not held in 2021 and 2022 because of the lockdowns and border restrictions in the global pandemic.

== Golden Shears Open Shearing Championship winners ==
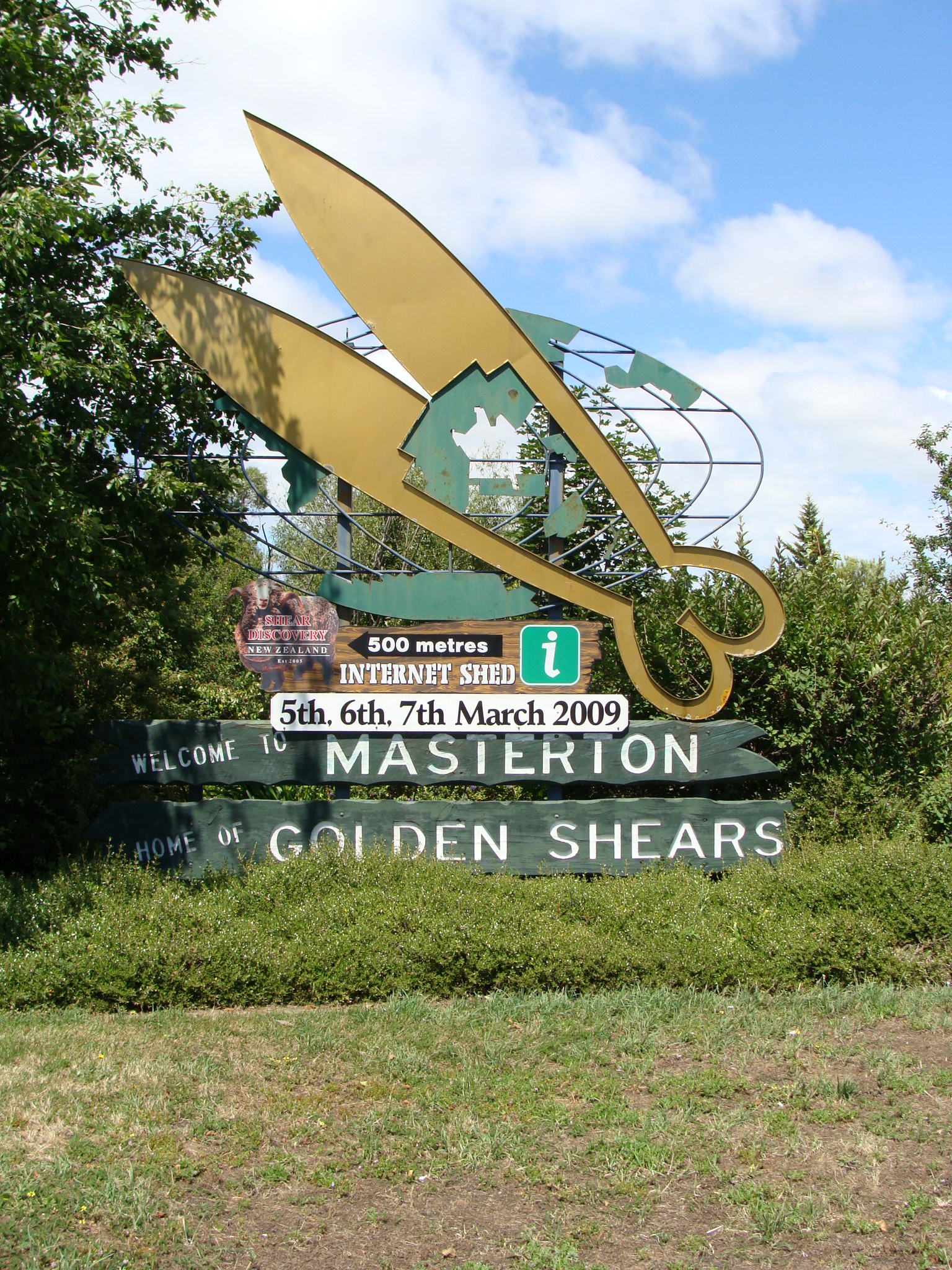

- 1961 Ivan Bowen
- 1962 Bing MacDonald
- 1963 Brian Waterson
- 1964 Stewart Symon
- 1965 Snow Quinn
- 1966 Bing Macdonald
- 1967 Snow Quinn
- 1968 Snow Quinn
- 1969 George Potae
- 1970 Snow Quinn
- 1971 Snow Quinn
- 1972 Snow Quinn
- 1973 Eddie Reidy
- 1974 Norm Blackwell
- 1975 Norm Blackwell
- 1976 Tom Brough
- 1977 Roger Cox
- 1978 Roger Cox
- 1979 Martin Ngataki
- 1980 Roger Cox
- 1981 Ivan Rosandich
- 1982 Colin King
- 1983 Alan Donaldson
- 1984 John Fagan
- 1985 Paul Grainger
- 1986 David Fagan
- 1987 Colin King
- 1988 Colin King
- 1989 Edsel Forde
- 1990 David Fagan
- 1991 David Fagan
- 1992 David Fagan
- 1993 David Fagan
- 1994 David Fagan
- 1995 David Fagan
- 1996 David Fagan
- 1997 David Fagan
- 1998 David Fagan
- 1999 David Fagan
- 2000 David Fagan
- 2001 David Fagan
- 2002 John Kirkpatrick
- 2003 David Fagan
- 2004 David Fagan
- 2005 Paul Avery
- 2006 Dion King
- 2007 Paul Avery
- 2008 John Kirkpatrick
- 2009 David Fagan
- 2010 Cam Ferguson
- 2011 John Kirkpatrick
- 2012 John Kirkpatrick
- 2013 Rowland Smith
- 2014 Rowland Smith
- 2015 Gavin Mutch
- 2016 Rowland Smith
- 2017 Rowland Smith
- 2018 Rowland Smith
- 2019 Rowland Smith
- 2020 Rowland Smith
- 2021 Not held
- 2022 Not held
- 2023 Rowland Smith
- 2024 Leon Samuels
- 2025 Toa Henderson
- 2026 Toa Henderson
