= David Fagan =

New Zealand sheep shearer

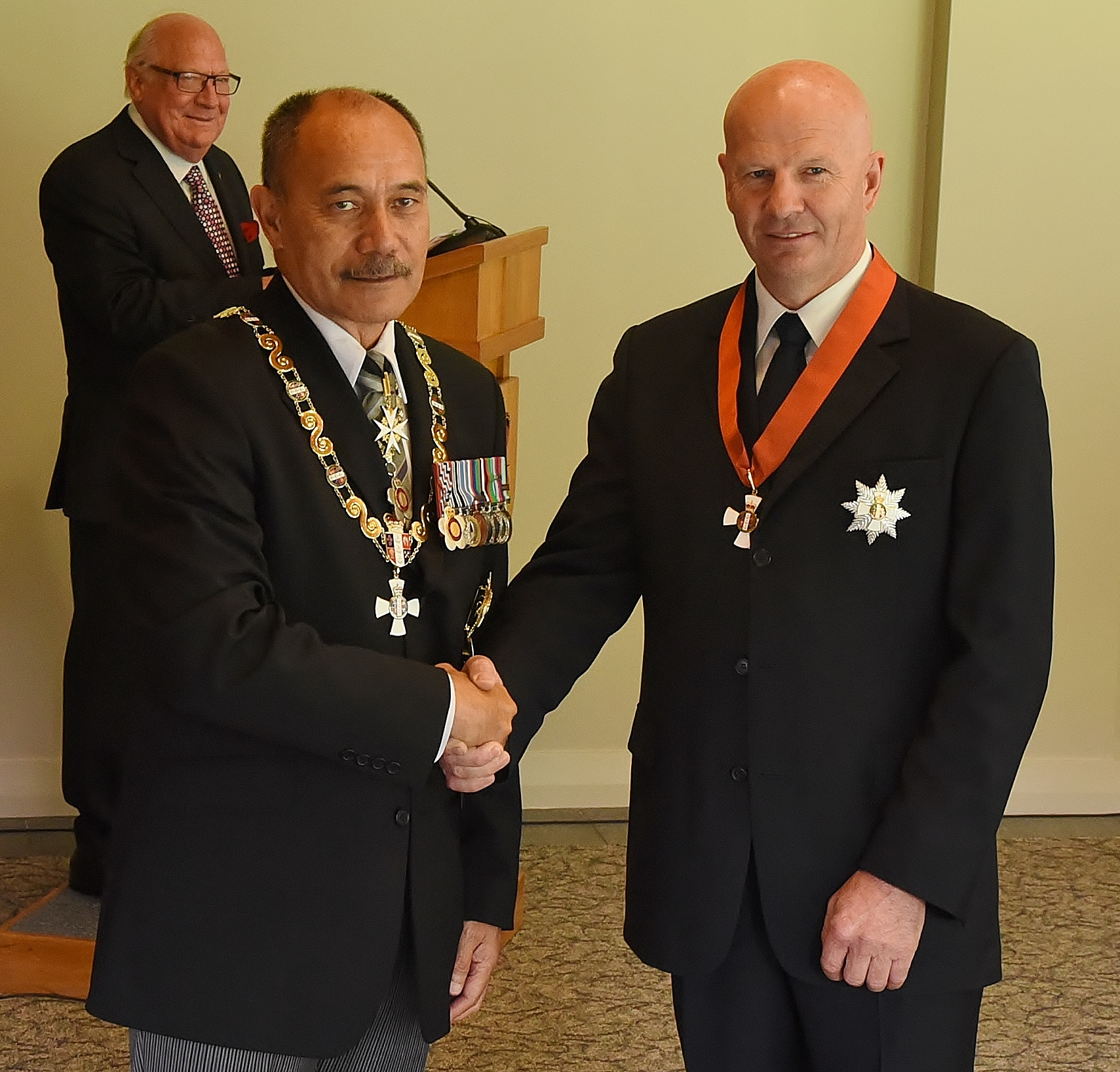
Fagan (right) in 2016, at his investiture as a Knight Companion of the New Zealand Order of Merit, by the governor-general, Sir Jerry Mateparae

Sir David Alexander Fagan KNZM (born 1961) is a New Zealand sheep shearer, who has won the New Zealand Golden Shears contest a record 16 times.

From Te Kūiti, Fagan has set 10 world records, and won five world, six world team, and 16 national titles, making him New Zealand's most successful competition sheep shearer.

== Honours ==
In 1990, Fagan was awarded the New Zealand 1990 Commemoration Medal. In the 1999 Queen's Birthday Honours, he was appointed a Member of the New Zealand Order of Merit, for services to shearing. He was promoted to Officer of the same order in the 2007 Queen’s Birthday Honours, and further promoted to Knight Companion of the New Zealand Order of Merit, also for services to shearing, in the 2016 New Year Honours.
