= Dilmah =

Sri Lankan brand of tea

Dilmah Ceylon Tea Company PLC
- Dilmah logo
- Type: Public
- Traded as: CSE: CTEA.N0000
- ISIN: LK0039N00004
- Industry: Beverage
- Founded: 1985; 41 years ago
- Founder: Merrill J. Fernando
- Headquarters: Peliyagoda, Sri Lanka
- Area served: Globally
- Key people: Dilhan C. Fernando (CEO)
- Products: Ceylon tea; Flavoured tea; Green tea
- Revenue: ▲LKR11,435 million (2022)
- Operating income: ▲LKR5,474 million (2022)
- Net income: ▲LKR5,570 million (2022)
- Total assets: ▲LKR22,923 million (2022)
- Total equity: ▲LKR18,718 million (2022)
- Owners: Ceylon Tea Services (66.61%); MJF Exports (20.53%); Employees' Provident Fund (7.61%)
- Number of employees: 634 (2022)
- Parent: Ceylon Tea Services
- Subsidiaries: MJF Beverages Dilmah Ceylon Cinnamon Company
- Website: www.dilmahtea.com

Dilmah Ceylon Tea Company PLC, trading as Dilmah, is a Sri Lankan beverage company that is headquartered in Peliyagoda, Western Province, Sri Lanka. While MJF Teas is the parent company of Dilmah, MJF Holdings is the ultimate parent. The company is best known for its brand of Ceylon tea, sold internationally. The company was founded in 1985 by Merrill J. Fernando. As of 2023 Dilmah is the 10th largest tea brand in the world.

== History ==
The company's founder, Merrill J. Fernando, was born in 1930 in Negombo in British Ceylon. He moved to Colombo, where he became one of the Ceylonese tea tasters, after doing his training at Mincing Lane in London. While there, he was astonished to see that different teas were mixed and blended but still marketed as pure Ceylon tea. The tea which had been hand-picked and produced according to the Ceylonese traditional process was being used only as a raw material. It was bought cheaply, with branding and packaging taking place in Europe and the UK. This system meant that the tea producers received only tiny amounts of the total profit, with middlemen (wholesalers and resellers, mainly a few large corporations) receiving the greatest share of the profit.

In 1962, he founded Ceylon Tea Services Company and later that year Merrill J. Fernando Company, which exported loose tea across the world, including North America and Australasia. In 1982 Fernando established Ceylon Tea Services Ltd, which became one of the first companies listed as a public company on the Colombo Stock Exchange.

In 1985, Fernando launched the brand name "Dilmah", which was chosen by combining the first names of Fernando's sons, Dilhan and Malik. His aim was to serve the poor and underprivileged through his new company. He took a while to first convince the Australian supermarket retailer Coles to stock his new brand of tea, but eventually won over the Coles buyer, In 1988 the company was established, and a Melbourne Coles store started stocking Dilmah on its shelves. It eventually spread to 35 other Coles stores in Victoria and then Woolworths started selling the product as well. Dilmah later exported the tea to New Zealand, where it was the top-selling brand in 2013, and also to Europe and North America. In 2013, Australia made up 10 percent of Dilmah's global annual retail sales.

== Structure and governance ==
The headquarters of Dilmah Ceylon Tea Company PLC is situated in Peliyagoda, along with associate companies Kahawatte Plantations, MJF Exports, Forbes & Walker Tea Brokers, and others.

MJF Holdings is the parent company of these enterprises, which are listed on the Colombo Stock Exchange. Dilmah is the only fully vertically integrated tea company, which owns tea plantations, factories, printing and packaging facilities, and other investments in all segments of the tea industry.

== Revenue ==
In September 2009 Ceylon Tea Services, Dilmah's parent company, earned US$5.2 million on US$19.7 million in revenue, which was up from profits of US$1.3 million, on US$18.6 million in revenue the year before. As of 2023 Dilmah is the 10th largest tea brand in the world.

== Charity ==
In 2007, Dilmah Conservation was founded, with one of its main aims being to protect Sri Lankan forests.

== In popular culture ==
The company and brand were also well known through its television commercials featuring Fernando himself and his trademark catchphrase "Do Try It". Singer and television personality Kamahl, also featured in the company's Australian television commercials in 1988.
