= 2007 Birthday Honours (New Zealand) =

Awards list for New Zealand

2007 Queen's Birthday Honours
- Previous: 2007 Special Honours; Next: 2007 gallantry awards
- Type: New Zealand royal honours: Order of New Zealand; New Zealand Order of Merit; Queen's Service Order; Queen's Service Medal; New Zealand Antarctic Medal; Distinguished Service Decoration
- Date: 4 June 2007
- Country: New Zealand

Highlights
- Total recipients: 191

The 2007 Queen's Birthday Honours in New Zealand, celebrating the official birthday of Queen Elizabeth II, were appointments made by the Queen in her right as Queen of New Zealand, on the advice of the New Zealand government, to various orders and honours to reward and highlight good works by New Zealanders. They were announced on 4 June 2007.

The recipients of honours are listed here as they were styled before their new honour.

== Order of New Zealand (ONZ) ==
Ordinary member

- The Right Honourable Sir Kenneth James Keith KBE – of The Hague, Netherlands.
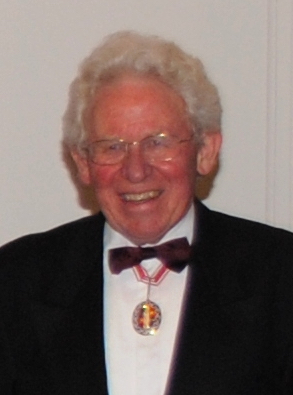
Sir Kenneth Keith

== New Zealand Order of Merit ==
=== Distinguished Companion (DCNZM) ===
- Dr Patricia Frances Grace QSO – of Porirua. For services to literature.
- Alison Burns Quentin-Baxter QSO – of Wellington. For services to the law.
- Stephen Robert Tindall ONZM – of North Shore. For services to business and the community.
- Henry William van der Heyden – of Hamilton. For services to agriculture.
- The Honourable William Gillow Gibbes Austen Young – of Christchurch. For services as president of the Court of Appeal of New Zealand.
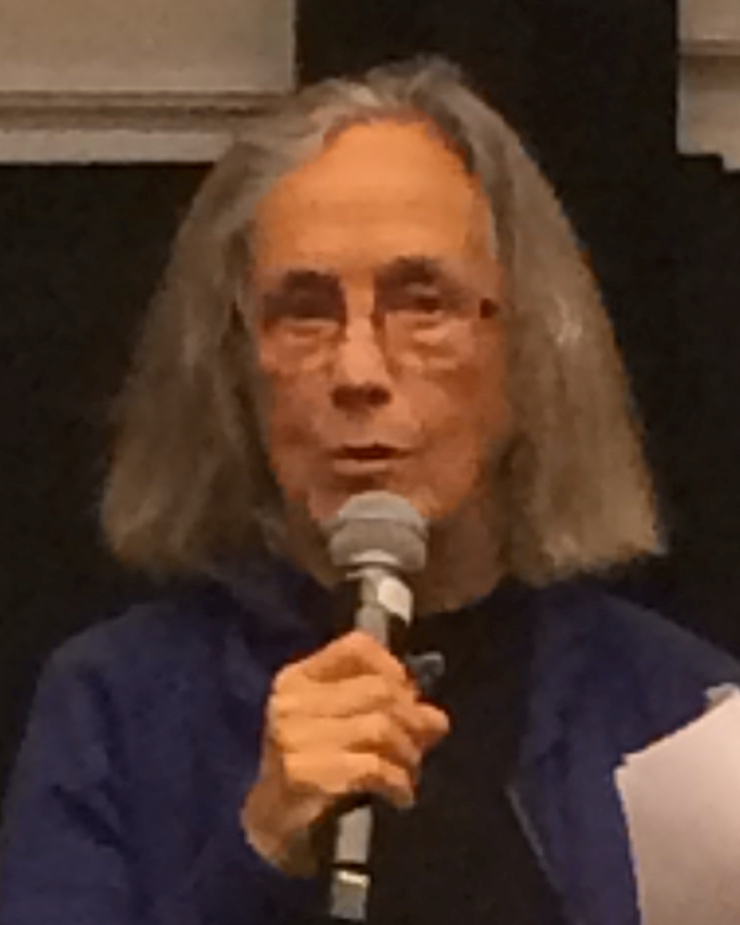
Patricia Grace

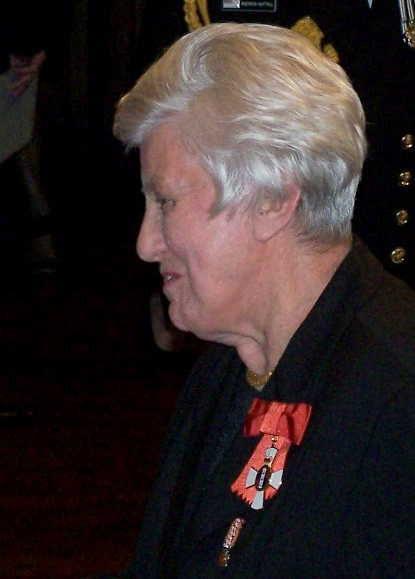
Alison Quentin-Baxter

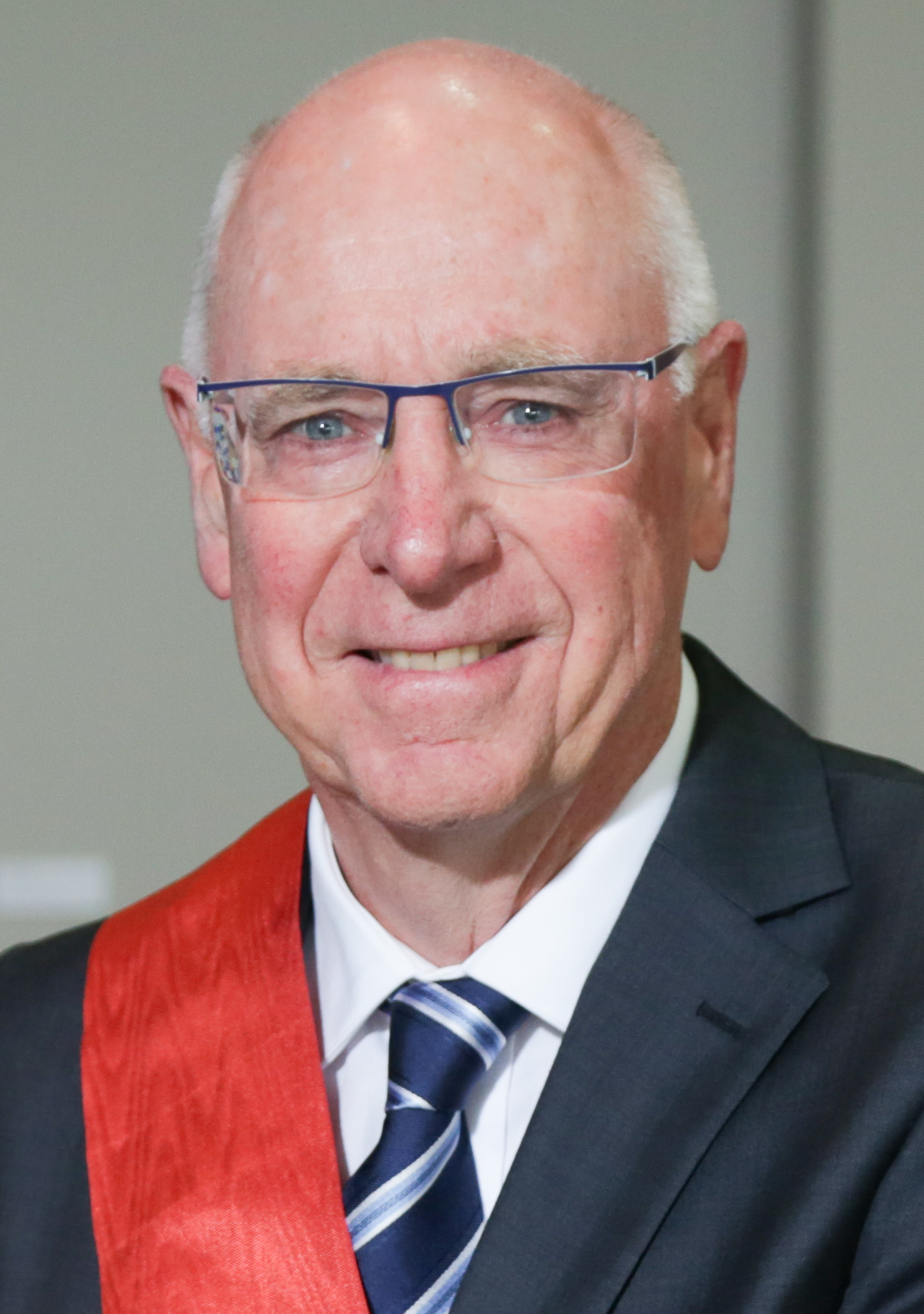
Stephen Tindall

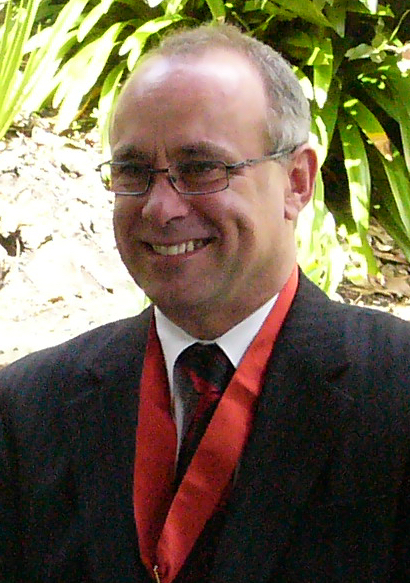
Henry van der Heyden

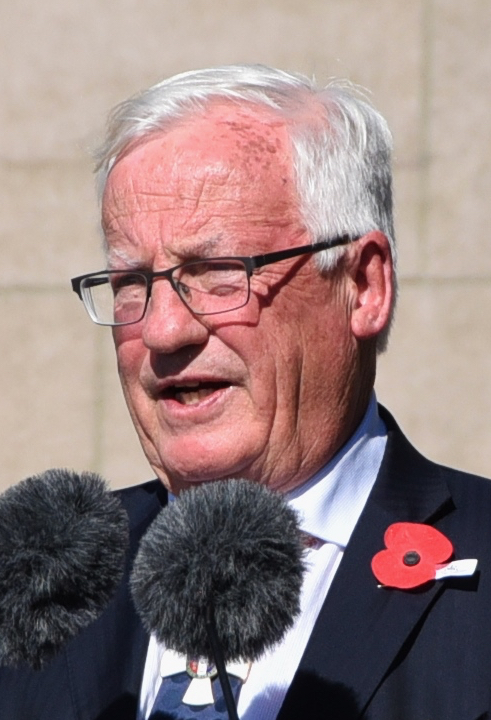
William Young

=== Companion (CNZM) ===
- Professor Edward Neill Baker – of North Shore. For services to science.
- Professor Gregor David Coster – of Auckland. For services to public health.
- James Alexander Douglas – of Hamilton. For services to agricultural science.
- Associate Professor David Francis Gerrard OBE – of Dunedin. For services to sports medicine.
- Kenneth Coulton Gorbey – of Wellington. For services to museums.
- Mita Robert Hoturoa Henare OBE – of Ōtaki. For services to the public health sector.
- The Right Reverend John Robert Osmers – of Kitwe, Zambia. For services to the Anglican Church.
- James Malcolm Ott OBE – of Christchurch. For services to the arts and the community.
- Susan Jane Sheldon – of Christchurch. For services to business.
- Dr Thomas Lance Rodney Wilson – of North Shore. For services to museum and art gallery administration.
- Neville Garde Austen Young – of Wellington. For services to business.
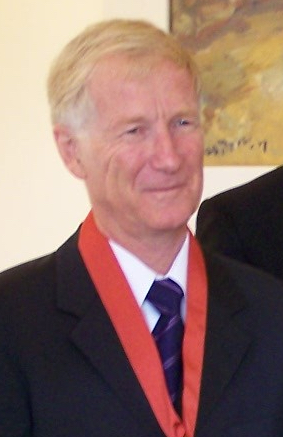
Ted Baker

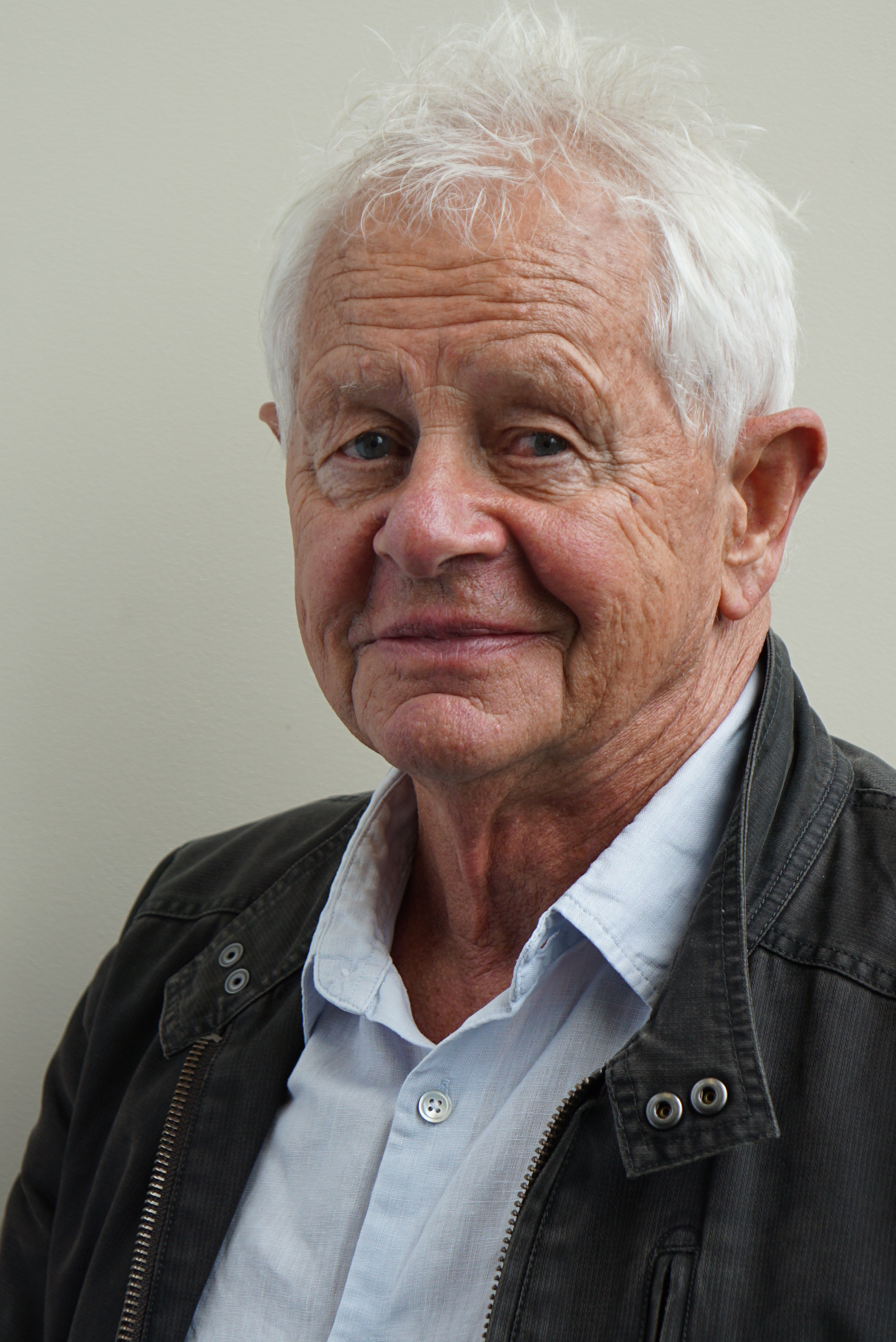
Dave Gerrard

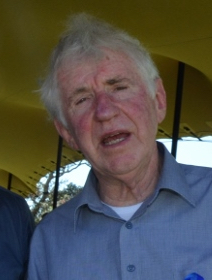
Ken Gorbey

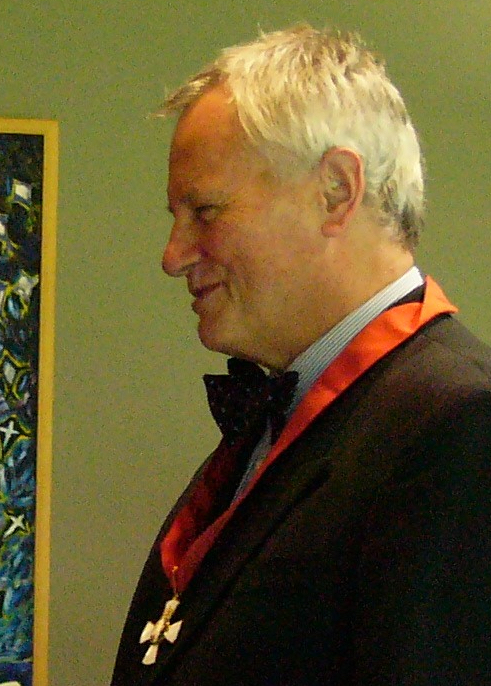
Rodney Wilson

=== Officer (ONZM) ===
- Ruby Alice Aberhart QSM – of Nelson. For services to senior citizens and the community.
- Graeme Seton Avery – of Hastings. For services to business and sport.
- Dr Rosemary Anne Beresford – of Dunedin. For services to medicine.
- Julie Claire Molloy Christie – of North Shore. For services to television.
- Cathrine Anne Coolahan – of Wellington. For services to the arts.
- Constantine Cotsilinis MNZM – of Pikermi, Greece. For services to New Zealand–Greece relations.
- Paul Roger Cressey – of Manukau. For services to the Child Cancer Foundation.
- Tina Marie Cross – of North Shore. For services to the music industry.
- James Robin Musgrave Davidson – of Christchurch. For services to the community.
- Rodney James Peter Davies – of Auckland. For services to planning and tourism.
- David Alexander Fagan MNZM – of Te Kūiti. For services to shearing.
- Dr Allan Ross Ferguson – of Auckland. For services to the kiwifruit industry.
- Professor Emeritus Martin Mitchell Ferguson – of Dunedin. For services to dentistry and palliative care.
- Neville John (Gus) Gale – of Christchurch. For services to mathematics education.
- William James (Jim) Gardner – of Christchurch. For services to historical research.
- Dr Annie Veronica Goldson – of Auckland. For services to film.
- Dr Janet Mary Grieve – of Wellington. For services to marine science.
- Dr Colin Holloway Hooker – of North Shore. For services to orthopaedic surgery.
- John James Patrick Kirwan MBE – of Tokyo, Japan. For services to mental health.
- Ginette Denise McDonald – of Wellington. For services to entertainment.
- Professor David James Mellor – of Palmerston North. For services to education.
- Kevin John Milne – of Waikanae. For services to broadcasting and the community.
- Tanara Whairiri Kitawhiti Ngata – of Auckland. For services to Māori broadcasting and television.
- Rosemary Jessie Stagg – of North Shore. For services to publishing.
- Alwyn Gordon Vette JP – of Manukau. For services to aviation.
- John Wayne Walden – of North Shore. For services to business and the community.
- Ruben James Wiki – of Manukau. For services to rugby league.
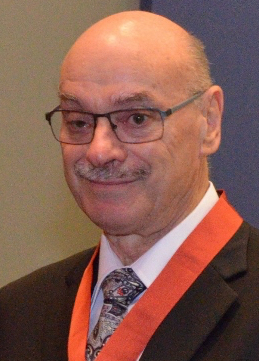
Graeme Avery

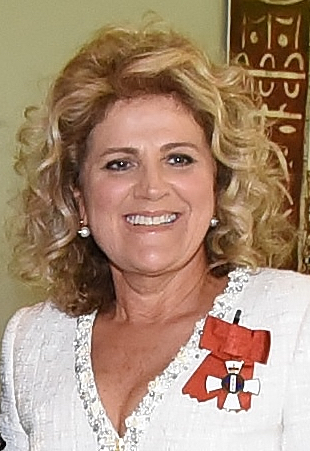
Julie Christie

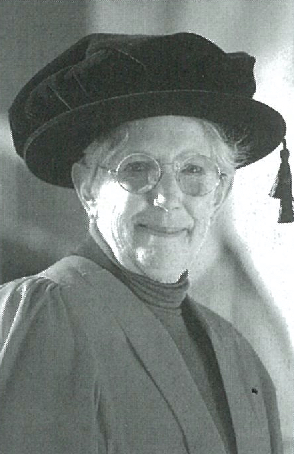
Kate Coolahan

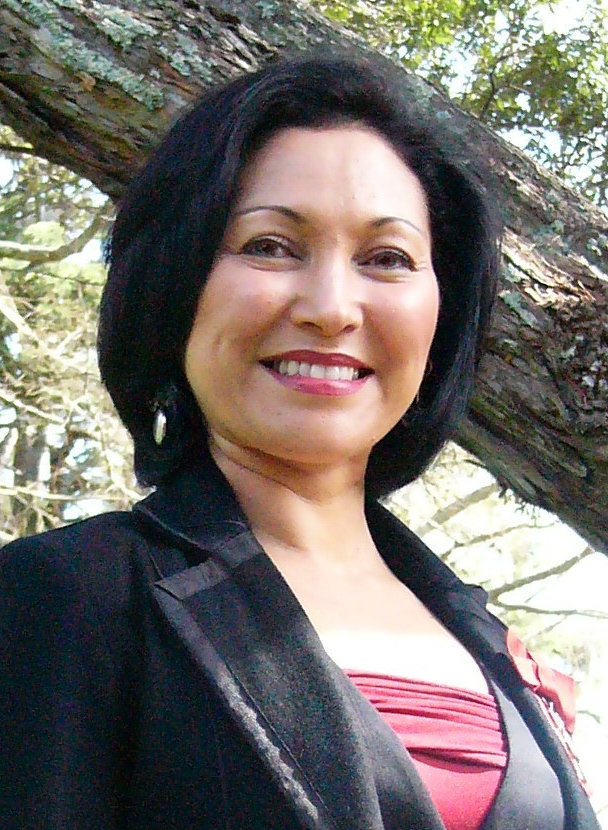
Tina Cross

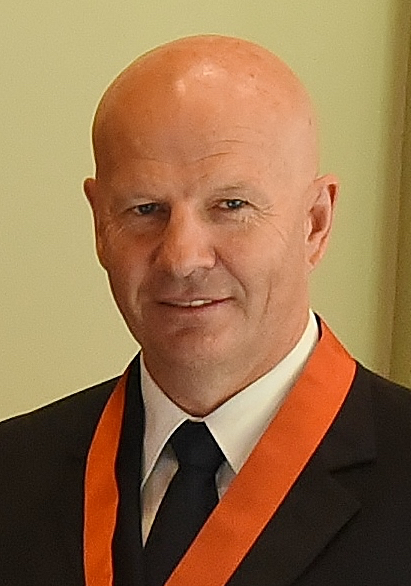
David Fagan

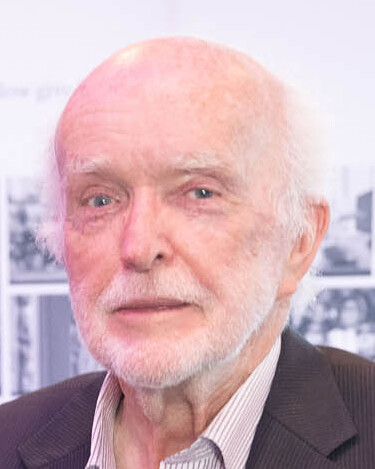
Ross Ferguson

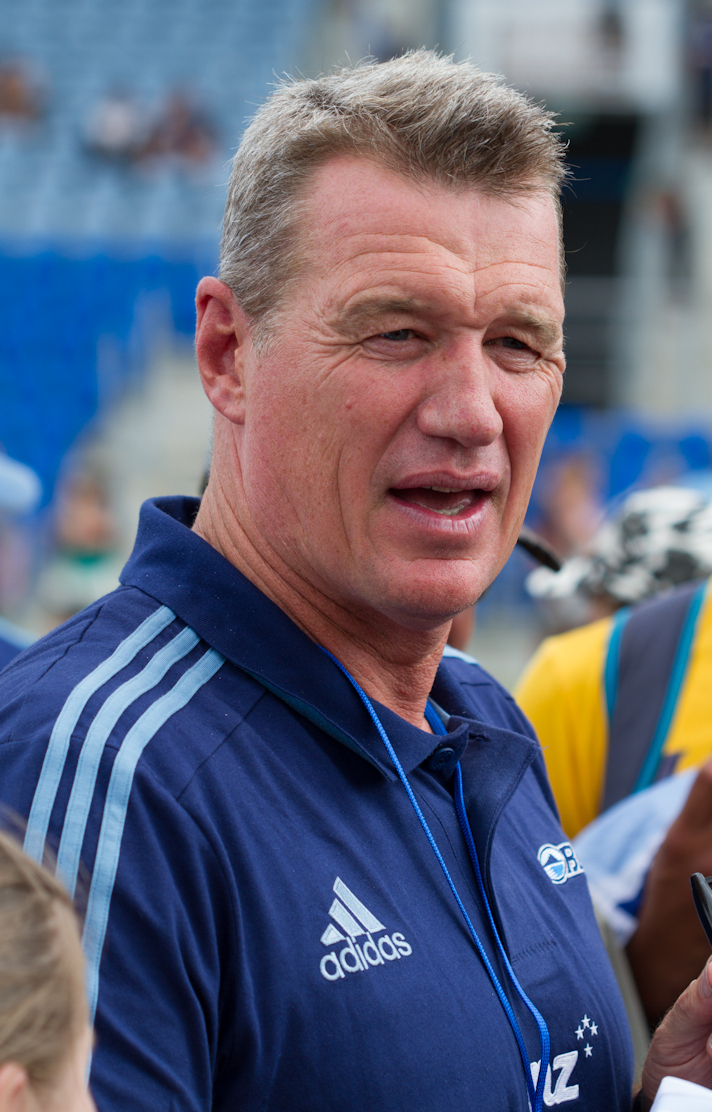
John Kirwan

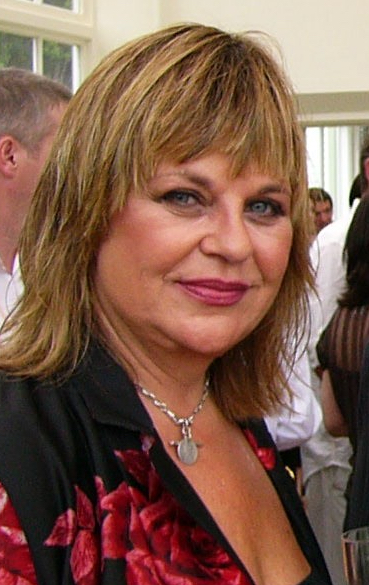
Ginette McDonald

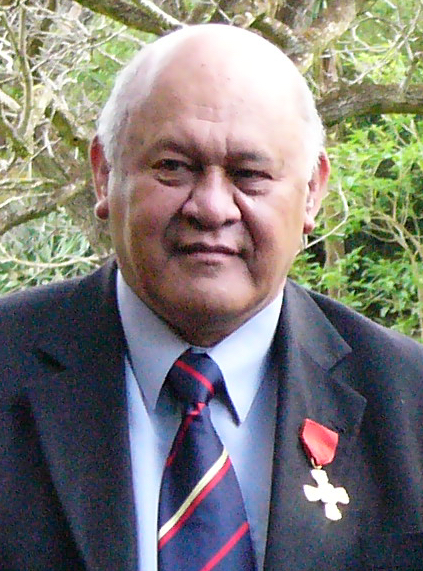
Whai Ngata

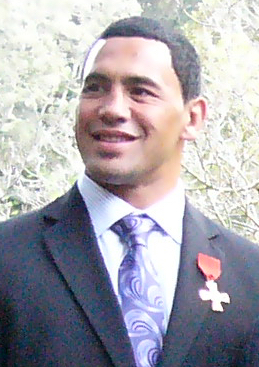
Ruben Wiki

=== Member (MNZM) ===
- Paul Anthony Adams – of Invercargill. For services to business.
- Alipapa Afakasi – of Manukau. For services to sport, in particular boxing.
- Nathan John Astle – of Christchurch. For services to cricket.
- Barry Ronald Barclay – of Ōmāpere. For services to film.
- Helen Margaret Brathwaite – of Dunedin. For services to education.
- Sister Paula Antoinette Brettkelly – of Pukerua Bay. For services to human rights.
- Dorothy Fay Brown – of Auckland. For services to education.
- Susan Mary Bunt – of Auckland. For services to women's golf.
- Brian Stuart Carmody – of Wellington. For services to the arts.
- Rupert Langton Clark – of Whangārei. For services to the community.
- Christopher Charles Cochran – of Wellington. For services to the conservation of historic buildings.
- Emeritus Professor John Albert Codd – of Palmerston North. For services to education.
- Leon Hetherington Crosse – of Wellington. For services to the Government Communications Security Bureau.
- Graham Poutu Emery – of Auckland; superintendent, New Zealand Police. For services to the New Zealand Police.
- William Michael Aicken Evans – of Greymouth. For services to woodchopping.
- Robert James Godderidge – of Urenui. For services to the community.
- Anthony John Hall – of Kaiapoi. For services to the community.
- Judith Robin Halliday – of Wellington. For services to peace and disarmament issues.
- Whai Pooti Hitchiner – of Gisborne. For services to Māori.
- John Lionel Hobson – of Hamilton. For services to caving.
- Marjorie Te Maari Joe JP – of Napier. For services to Māori and the community.
- Victor Ronald Johnson – of Hamilton. For services to returned services personnel and the community.
- Dr Lingappa Bhojappa Kalburgi JP – of Auckland. For services to the Indian community.
- Jonah Tali Lomu – of Auckland. For services to rugby.
- Neil Kevin Mander – of Auckland. For services to engineering and the community.
- Koa Joy Mantell – of Palmerston. For services to the community.
- Hemana Eruera Manuera JP – of Te Teko. For services to the community.
- Albert Edward McConnell – of Auckland. For services to cycling.
- Alexander Bruce Miller JP – of Franz Josef. For services to conservation.
- Grant Charles O'Fee – of Nelson; superintendent, New Zealand Police. For services to the New Zealand Police.
- Roderick James Patterson – of Kaukapakapa. For services to rugby and sports journalism.
- Rodney Horomona Pohio – of Kaiapoi. For services to jet boat sprinting.
- The Reverend Dr Simon Hugh Rae – of Dunedin. For services to the community.
- Maurice Morehu Ngatoko Rahipere JP – of Tauranga. For services to Māori.
- Valerie Pauline Redshaw JP – of Porirua. For services to education.
- Bruce Carlaw Richards, of New Plymouth. For services to the community.
- James Rimene – of Masterton. For services to Māori and the community.
- Ngaire Wilma Shand – of Hastings. For services to music education and sport.
- Cherie Kathryn Shanks – of Whangaparāoa. For services to women's rugby league.
- The Reverend Monsignor James Cornelius Shannahan – of Auckland. For services to the community.
- Sharon Elmar Sims – of Palmerston North. For services to lawn bowls.
- Fergus McLaren Sutherland – of Owaka. For services to conservation and tourism.
- Stuart Walter Thomson – of Manukau. For services to the roofing industry.
- Michael Guy Webber – of Wanganui. For services to optometry and the community.
- Roslein Mary Wilkes – of Blenheim. For services to riding for the disabled.
- Steve Williams – of Kumeū. For services to youth sport and recreation.
- Dr John Malcolm Wilson – of Christchurch. For services to historical research.
- Pamela Rowena Wilson – of Christchurch. For services to heritage conservation.
- Russell Joseph Wiseman – of Feilding. For services to the community.
- Warrant Officer Class One Mark Scott Priestley – Royal New Zealand Army Logistic Regiment (The Duke of York's Own).

Additional

- Corporal Royce Siataga Nelson – Royal New Zealand Infantry Regiment.
- Major Eugene Amorangi Whakahoehoe – Royal New Zealand Infantry Regiment.

Honorary

- Tony Christodoulou – of Nicosia, Cyprus. For services to New Zealand–Cyprus relations.
- Elhamy Mostafa Fahmy Elzayat – of Cairo, Egypt. For services to New Zealand–Egypt relations.
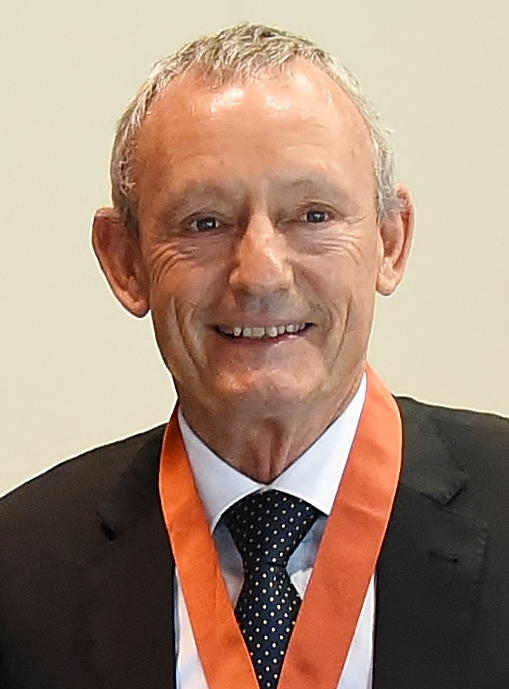
Tony Hall

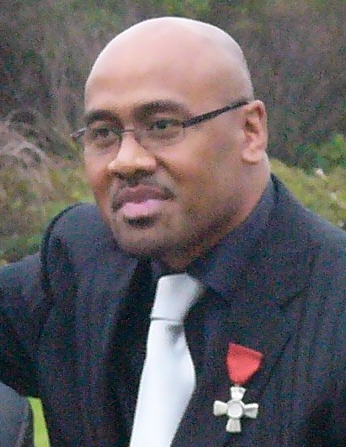
Jonah Lomu

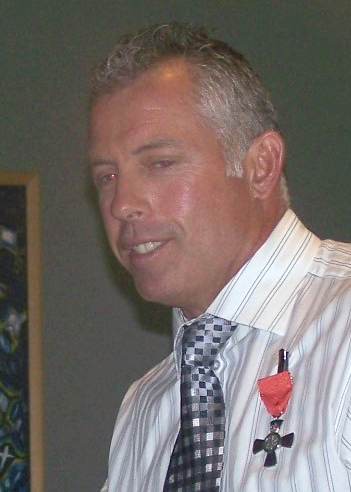
Steve Williams

== Companion of the Queen's Service Order (QSO) ==
- Caroline Bennett – of Rotorua. For services to education.
- Carolynn Michelle Veronica Kahikatea Bull – of Christchurch. For services to the law, Māori and the community.
- Dr Graham William Arthur Bush – of Auckland. For services to historical research, notably local government.
- Professor Carol Cardno – of Auckland. For services to educational administration and management.
- Sharron Mary Cole – of Lower Hutt. For services to health.
- Pamela June Erni JP – of Wanganui. For services to business and local government.
- Waldour Ross Familton JP – of North Shore. For services to education and as a justice of the peace.
- John Collingwood King – of Auckland. For services to business and the community.
- Wikeepa Te Rangipuawhe Maika – of Rotorua. For services to Māori.
- Margaret Dorothy McLeod – of Wellington. For services to education.
- Dr William Henry Robinson – of Masterton. For services to engineering.
- Dr Dianne Rosemary Webster – of Auckland. For services to public health, in particular paediatrics.
- Beryl Merle Wilkinson – of Whangarei. For services to senior citizens.
- Robert Kinsela Workman – of Lower Hutt. For services to prisoner welfare.
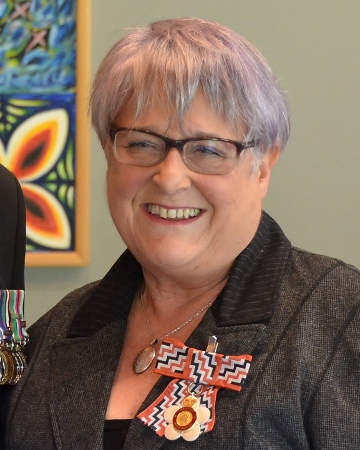
Dianne Webster

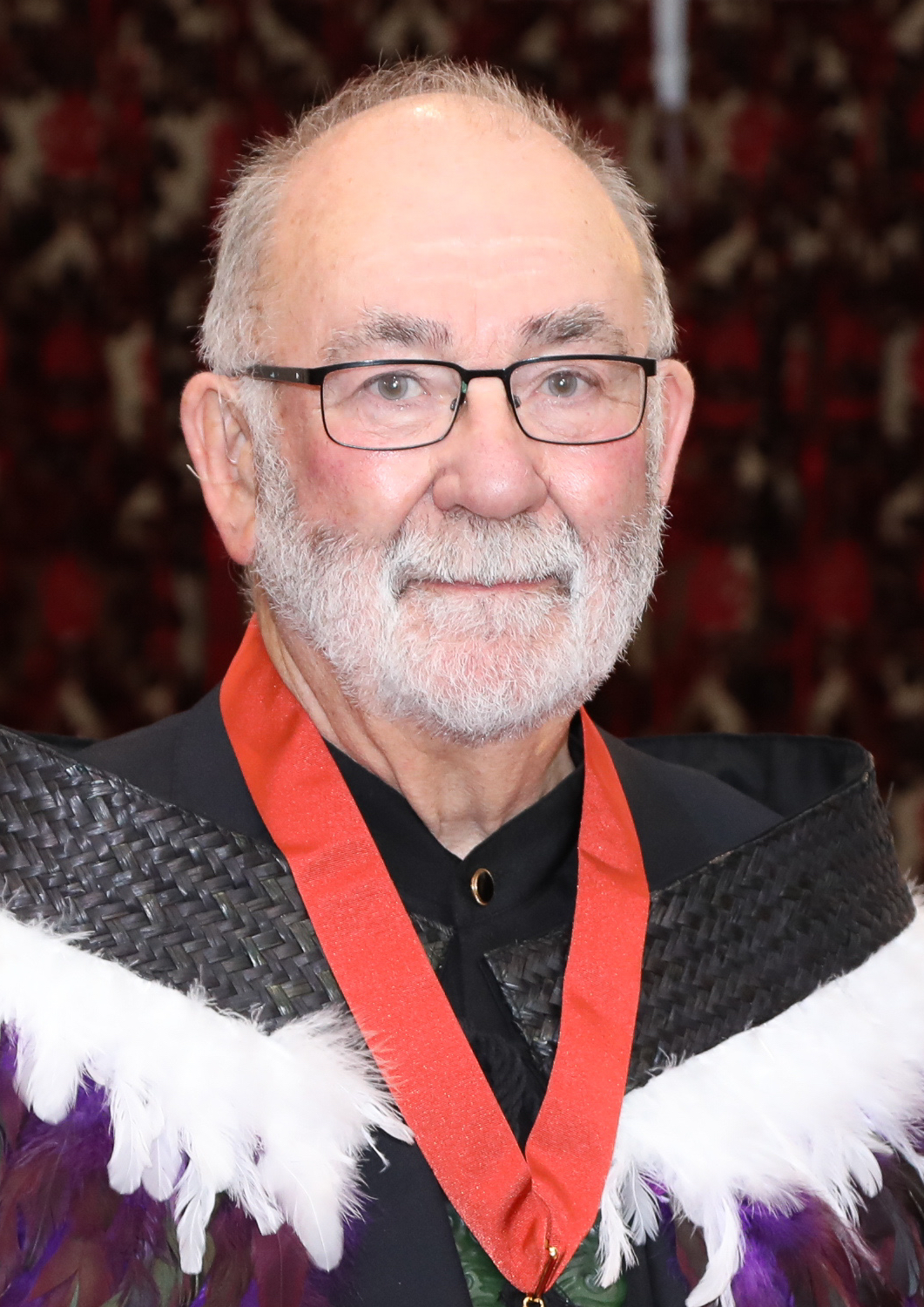
Kim Workman

== Queen's Service Medal (QSM) ==
- Robin Reginald Addison – of Tauranga. For services to education and the community.
- Stanley Noel Allen – of Tūrangi; formerly chief fire officer, Turangi Volunteer Fire Brigade, New Zealand Fire Service. For services to the New Zealand Fire Service.
- Dr John Barr – of Tauranga. For services to the community.
- Vivian Patrick Barrett – of Ashburton. For services to the community.
- Robert Michael Burnett Batten – of Porirua. For services to the Boys’ Brigade.
- Rodger Graeme Beatson – of Kaitaia; chief fire officer, Ahipara Volunteer Fire Brigade, New Zealand Fire Service. For services to the New Zealand Fire Service.
- Peter John Blackwell – of Tauranga; detective, New Zealand Police. For services to the New Zealand Police.
- Raymond Francis Bray – of Tūrangi; chief fire officer, Turangi Volunteer Fire Brigade, New Zealand Fire Service. For services to the community.
- Barry Ronald Browne – of North Shore; formerly station officer, Auckland Region, New Zealand Fire Service. For services to the New Zealand Fire Service.
- Loraine Ellen Bruce – of Dunedin. For services to the community.
- Noel Francis Burns – of Timaru. For services to music and entertainment.
- Lois Isabella Bush – of Manukau. For services to netball.
- Maxwell Charles Carroll – of New Plymouth. For services to education and the community.
- Marie Anne Elizabeth Chirnside – of Christchurch. For services to the community.
- Zina Lilliany Clarke – of Rotorua. For services to the community.
- Joan Isabel Coppell – of Napier. For public services.
- Ronald George Dalley JP – of Kaiapoi. For services to the community.
- John Davis – of Tauranga. For services to the community.
- Frances Joan Dibble – of Palmerston North. For services to art, in particular sculpture.
- Sylvia Durrant – of North Shore. For services to wildlife.
- Colin Campbell Emslie – of Putāruru. For services to the community.
- Grahame Elsbert Felton – of Christchurch. For services to the community.
- Ian Stuart Fox – of Manukau. For services to education.
- Kathleen Joan Gardner – of Taupō. For services to the community.
- Rex Neville Gibson – of Napier. For services to education, Māori, and refugees.
- Constance Hinewai Gilbert – of Napier. For services to the community.
- Jennifer Grant – of Hastings. For services to dance, in particular ballet.
- George Henry Mills Green JP – of Manukau. For services to the community.
- Bruce James Harvey – of Waitakere (West Auckland). For services to conservation and the community.
- Dr Catherine Frances Harvey – of Waitakere. For services to conservation and the community.
- Ann Johnstone Heaphy – of Palmerston North. For services to the community.
- Robyn Higgins – of Palmerston North. For services to the community.
- Patricia Verna Howell – of Te Kūiti. For services to the community.
- Betty Monica Hubbard – of Te Aroha. For services to the community.
- Henry Arthur Hubbert – of Waitakere. For services to the community.
- Leslie John Ingham – of Manukau. For services to the community.
- Nancy Jensen – of Ōtorohanga. For services to conservation.
- John Edwin Jones – of Gisborne. For services to journalism and sport.
- Evan Locksley Kellas ED – of Dunedin; senior constable, New Zealand Police. For services to the New Zealand Police.
- Heather Lillian King – of Manukau. For services to education and the community.
- Beverley Mary Kingston – of Blenheim. For services to recycling and the community.
- Joan Lardner-Rivlin – of North Shore. For services to the community.
- Isla Joyce Leach – of Winton. For services to the community.
- Lieutenant Colonel George Joseph MacLeod ED JP (Retired) – of Rotorua. For services to returned services personnel and the community.
- Barbara Monica Marshall – of Porirua. For services to conservation.
- Beverley Norma McCaw JP – of Oamaru. For services to the community.
- Olive Joyce McEwan – of Mount Louisa, Queensland, Australia. For services to the Office of the Ombudsmen.
- John David McGrail – of Wellington; senior constable, New Zealand Police. For services to the New Zealand Police.
- Nichola Cecile McKinney – of Auckland. For services to the New Zealand Customs Service.
- William Vernon McMinn – of Taumarunui. For services to music.
- Janice Margaret Morison – of Kaiapoi. For services to scouting.
- Hinerangi Elaine Murray – of Kaitaia. For services to Māori.
- Adrienne Ngata – of Tikitiki; firefighter, Tikitiki Volunteer Fire Brigade, New Zealand Fire Service. For services to the New Zealand Fire Service.
- Arii Urirau Oka – of Auckland. For services to the Cook Islands community.
- Janet Mary Owen – of Rotorua. For services to the community.
- Russell Fleming Paul – of Timaru. For services to heritage railways.
- Joseph Francis Cheetham Rodrigues – of New Plymouth. For services to the community.
- Leslie William Rogerson – of Arrowtown. For services to the community.
- Brian James Schaab – of Napier; detective sergeant, New Zealand Police. For services to the New Zealand Police.
- Grant Christopher Smith – of Whangārei; detective sergeant, New Zealand Police. For services to the New Zealand Police.
- Phyllis Hana Smith – of Hamilton. For services to the community.
- Colin Wilson Smithies – of Auckland, manager rural fire, National Rural Fire Authority, New Zealand Fire Service. For services to the New Zealand Fire Service.
- Maureen Ellen Speedy – of Hamilton. For services to families.
- Roopa Suchdev – of North Shore. For services to the Indian community.
- Victor Andrew Talyancich JP – of Waitakere. For services to business and the Croatian community.
- Malcolm Andrew Taylor – of Tauranga. For services to athletics.
- Shona Patricia Thomson – of Invercargill. For services to music administration.
- Moray David Watson – of Lyttelton. For services to business.
- The Reverend Richard James Waugh – of Manukau. For services to aviation history and the community.

== New Zealand Antarctic Medal (NZAM) ==
- Dr Frederick John Davey – of Ōtaki. For services to Antarctic science.

== New Zealand Distinguished Service Decoration (DSD) ==
- Private Jonathon Aaron Ishmael Fatu – Royal New Zealand Infantry Regiment.
- Squadron Leader Shane Andrew Meighan – Royal New Zealand Air Force.
- Lieutenant Commander Robert James Mills VRD – Royal New Zealand Naval Volunteer Reserve.
- Wing Commander Barry John Nelson – Royal New Zealand Air Force.
- Lieutenant Colonel Brett James Rankin – Royal Regiment of New Zealand Artillery.
- Squadron Leader James Patrick Rankin – Royal New Zealand Air Force.
- Corporal Darren Kavan Te Whata – Royal New Zealand Army Logistic Regiment (The Duke York's Own).
- Corporal William Peter Watters – Royal New Zealand Infantry Regiment.
- Group Captain Michael Edward Yardley – Royal New Zealand Air Force.
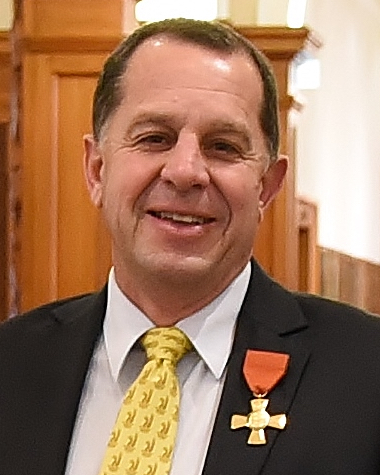
Mike Yardley
