= Kate Sylvester =

New Zealand fashion designer

Kate Sylvester ONZM
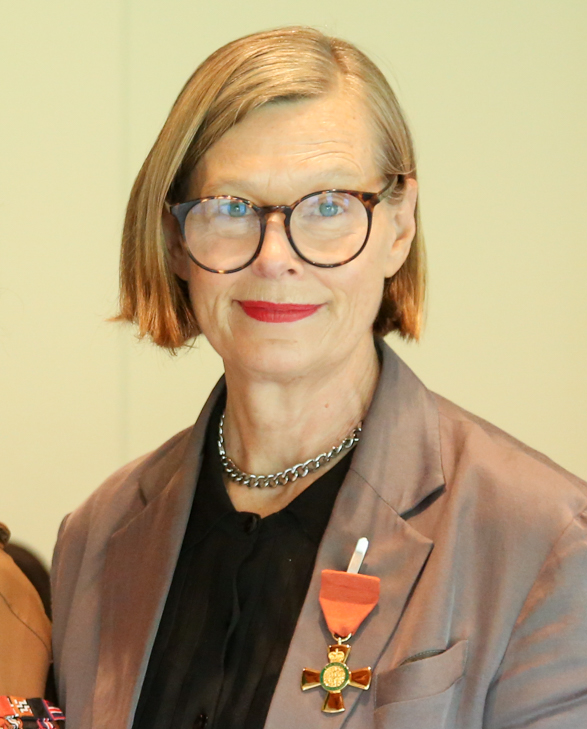
- Sylvester in 2025
- Born: Kate Elizabeth Sylvester; 1966 or 1967 (age 59–60)
- Education: Wellington Polytechnic
- Occupations: Fashion designer; businesswoman
- Label: Kate Sylvester
- Partner: Wayne Conway
- Children: 3

Kate Elizabeth Sylvester ONZM (born 1966 or 1967) is a New Zealand fashion designer known for combining sportswear, lingerie and traditional tailoring. Her designs are often influenced by books or art, and the fashion of the 1930s and 1950s. Former Fashion Quarterly editor Fiona Hawtin has called Sylvester one of the stalwarts of New Zealand fashion. Metro Magazine named her one of New Zealand's top five designers. In 2019 Sylvester co-founded Mindful Fashion, a clothing and textiles collective.

== Biography ==
Sylvester was born in 1966 or 1967. She grew up in Greenhithe on Auckland's North Shore, and was educated at Westlake Girls High School. Her father, Ron, was a lecturer at teachers' college, while her mother, Toni, taught her how to sew.

Sylvester studied textile and clothing design at Wellington Polytechnic from 1985 to 1986, and began her career hand-sewing screen-printed t-shirts. She went to London, and worked in the Liberty department store, for Arabella Pollen as a machinist, and for Corinne Robson in Paris. On her return to New Zealand, Sylvester launched her first label, Sister, with her partner and co-founder Wayne Conway. Their label was advertised with street graffiti. The first Sister store opened in Kitchener Street, Auckland, in 1993.

The couple changed the name of the clothing label to Kate Sylvester in 1997, after a foray into the Australian market met resistance from the Australian label Sista.

Her first fashion show with the new brand name was held in Sydney in 1999, and featured the collection Arts and Crafts. It set off a bidding war between two luxury New York department stores, Barneys and Henri Bendel.

Titles for her collections are often based on literary works or characters, and have included Catcher in the Rye, Love in a Cold Climate, Brighton Rock and This Charming Man, which was inspired by Marcel Proust. Her eyewear collections have included spectacles named Sylvia (Plath), Harper (Lee), Janet (Frame) and Eleanor (Catton). Sylvester's collection Art Groupie referenced the Surrealists, and The Kiss, a painting by Gustav Klimt.

Sylvester has shown collections at iD Dunedin Fashion Week, and has been a judge for its International Emerging Designer Awards.

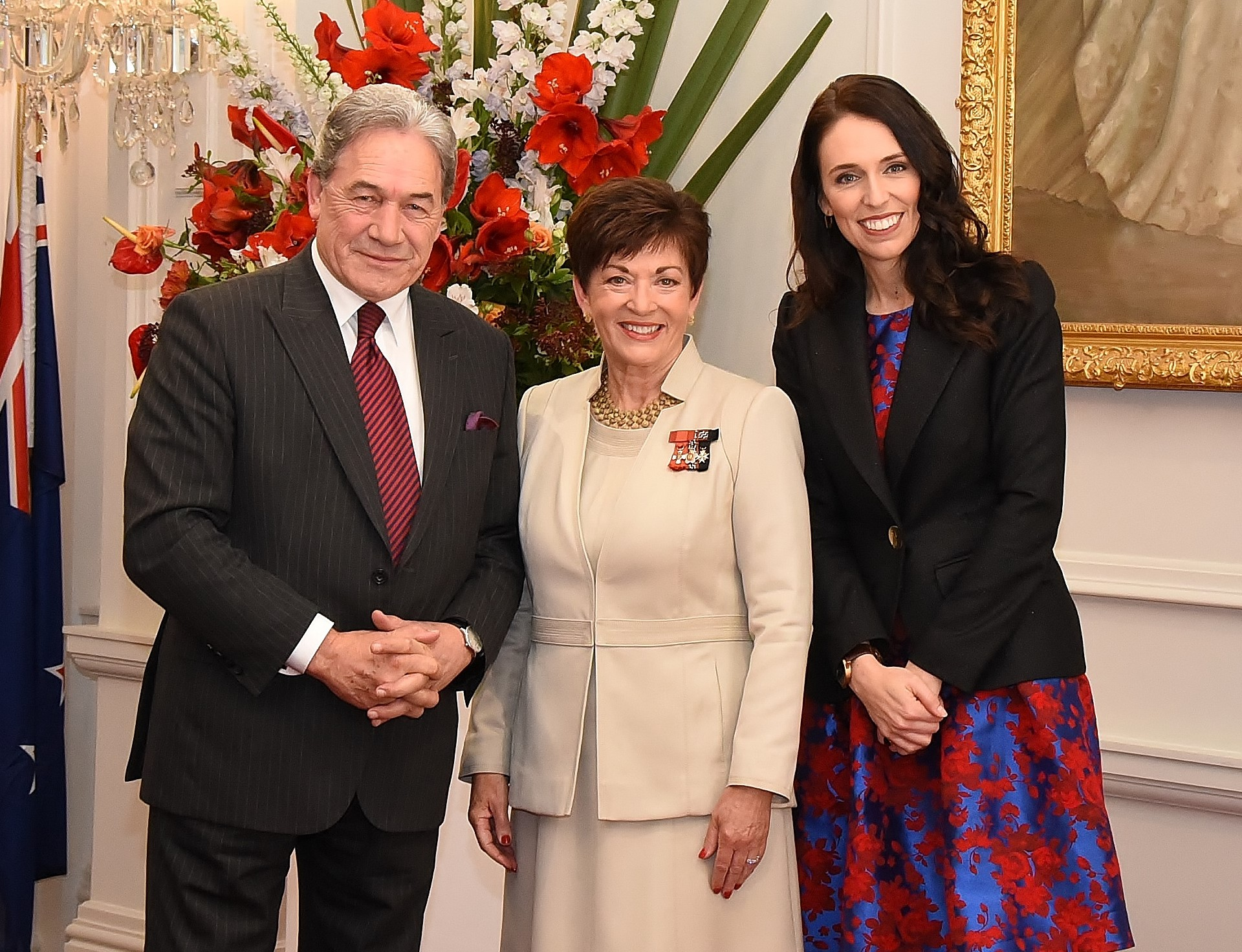
Jacinda Ardern (right), wearing a dress and jacket by Kate Sylvester at the swearing in of Ardern's government in October 2017

When sworn in as New Zealand prime minister in 2017, Jacinda Ardern wore a red and blue floral Kate Sylvester dress and tailored jacket. The outfit is now in the collection of the Museum of New Zealand Te Papa Tongarewa, having been donated by Ardern in 2023.

In 2019, Sylvester co-founded Mindful Fashion, a clothing and textiles collective, with Emily Miller-Sharma from the label Ruby. Mindful Fashion is a not-for-profit organisation aimed at improving sustainable business practices, and strengthening the New Zealand fashion and textile industry. The group is urging the New Zealand government to sponsor a garment manufacturing apprenticeship programme to fill industry skill shortages.

"Having an industry body is so valuable when we were going through [the Covid pandemic] – for example, when the government was outlining the requirements for reopening [after the last lockdown] they originally stipulated no changing rooms. If we weren’t allowed to have them, we may as well not have opened, you can’t sell frocks if you can’t try them on. We lobbied successfully for that, we put the guidelines in as to how stores could utilise the changing rooms safely."

Sylvester owns the diffusion lines Sylvester, Kate Sylvester eyewear, accessories, lingerie, and homeware produced with the Auckland design studio Douglas + Bec.

On 9 April 2024, Sylvester announced the business, with six stores in New Zealand, would close in 2025, after a final Summer 24 collection. The label has three stores in Auckland, two in Christchurch and one in Wellington. However, after the closure her three sons then relaunched the brand as Sylvester and in April three stores (Cashel Street, Cuba Street, Newmarket) were re-opened under the Sylvester label.

== Honours and awards ==
In 2008, Sylvester was inducted into the Massey University College of Creative Arts Hall of Fame. In the same year, she won the Emerging Small-to-Medium Business Award at the NZI National Sustainable Business Awards. In 2011, Sylvester was conferred an honorary doctorate in fine arts by Massey University. In the 2025 New Year Honours, Sylvester was appointed an Officer of the New Zealand Order of Merit, for services to the fashion industry.

== Personal life ==
Sylvester lives in Auckland and has three sons with her partner, Wayne Conway, who she met at a party in Wellington when she was 20 years old. In 2025, her son Tom was paralyzed from the upper chest down while diving into a swimming pool, becoming a quadriplegic and dependant on a wheelchair for mobility.

== See also ==
- List of honorary doctors of Massey University
