= Mac McMeekan =

New Zealand university professor, agricultural scientist and administrator

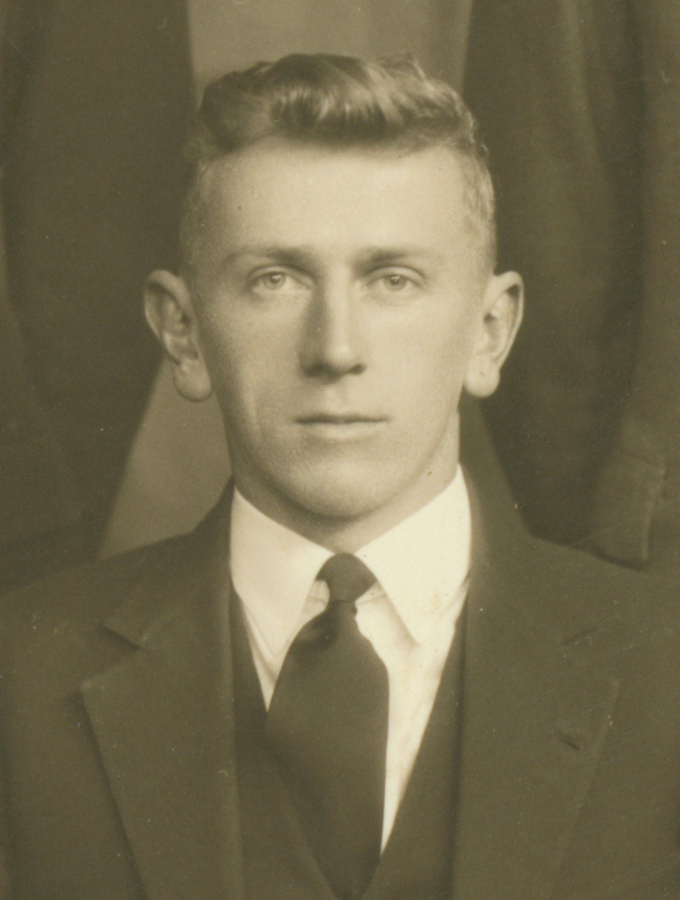
McMeekin while president of the Massey Agricultural College Students' Association in 1930–1931

Campbell Percy "Mac" McMeekan CBE (29 July 1908 – 2 July 1972) was a New Zealand university professor, agricultural scientist and administrator.

McMeekan was born in Otaki, New Zealand, in 1908. He received his secondary education at Midhirst School and then at New Plymouth Boys' High School. He had further training at Stratford Technical High School before starting at Victoria University College in agriculture in 1927. After a merger, he continued at the newly-formed Massey Agricultural College in Palmerston North from the following year, from where he graduated in 1932. He remained as a lecturer at Massey and then did further study at the University of Cambridge where he gained his PhD. He returned to Massey as a lecturer in 1938 and moved to the Canterbury Agricultural College in 1939. He was not a good fit at the conservative college in Lincoln and was attracted to an animal research station at Ruakura in 1943. He lost his job in 1962 and then worked for the World Bank. He returned to New Zealand in 1966.

He was appointed a Commander of the Order of the British Empire in the 1958 Queen's Birthday Honours. He had an honorary doctorate conferred by Massey University in 1966.

On 2 July 1972, he drowned in Auckland Harbour after his boat capsized. At 17 stone (240 lb; 110 kg), he was too heavy to be helped onto another boat. He had drowned after a five-hour rescue mission. McMeekan had been married twice and was survived by his second wife, and two children from his first marriage.
