= Kate Coolahan =

New Zealand commercial artist, fashion illustrator and printmaker (1929–2025)

Kate Coolahan ONZM
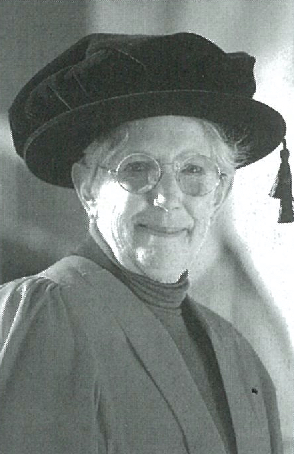
- Coolahan in 2003
- Born: Cathrine Anne Castle; 2 November 1929; Sydney, New South Wales, Australia
- Died: 3 January 2025 (aged 95); Tītahi Bay, New Zealand
- Spouse: Max Coolahan (m. 1951; died 1985)

Cathrine Anne Coolahan ONZM (née Castle; 2 November 1929 – 3 January 2025) was a New Zealand commercial artist, fashion illustrator and printmaker. Her work is held in the permanent collections of the Museum of New Zealand Te Papa Tongarewa, Auckland Art Gallery Toi o Tāmaki and the British Museum.

== Life and career ==
Coolahan was born in Sydney, Australia, to Roderick Castle, a printer, and Dorothy Vera Evans, a homemaker. She attended Neutral Bay Girls Junior High School and then studied art at the East Sydney Technical College from 1945 to 1950, graduating with honours in 1950. She then worked in the art department of Farmer & Co., a Sydney department store, where she designed brochures, wrapping paper, packaging and advertising.

Coolahan met her husband, Max Coolahan, at East Sydney Technical College. They married in Sydney on 5 March 1951.

In 1952, Coolahan took a three-month position in Wellington, New Zealand, with the advertising agency J. Inglis Wright Ltd, which then became a permanent position. In 1954 she moved to a rival Wellington advertising agency, Carlton Carruthers du Chateau and King. One of the agency's key clients was Lane Walker Rudkin, a Christchurch-based clothing manufacturer. Coolahan designed packaging and promotional material for the company's Canterbury label, which included clothing, lingerie, hosiery, children's wear and swim wear. In 1957 she left the agency due to the effects of an accident that had injured her right hand. While recuperating, she worked at the Dominion Museum as an assistant education officer.

In 1959, Coolahan returned to the advertising industry, working for James Smith Ltd, a Wellington department store, where she created a house style for the store's fashion campaigns. She worked again for Carlton Carruthers du Chateau and then at James Smith part-time while she taught design part-time at Wellington Polytechnic. She also studied printmaking and etching under John Drawbridge and became noted for her printwork.

In 1964, she resigned from James Smith and worked as a freelance designer and tutor. Her clients included the New Zealand Broadcasting Association and NZBC Symphony Orchestra. She also painted and exhibited, including in the contemporary New Zealand painting exhibitions at the Auckland City Art Gallery in 1964 and 1965. She continued to teach design at Wellington Polytechnic until 1983.

In 1985 and 1986, a retrospective exhibition of Coolahan's work toured New Zealand.

Coolahan died at Tītahi Bay on 3 January 2025 at the age of 95. She was predeceased by her husband in 1985.

== Recognition ==
In 2003, Coolahan was conferred an honorary doctorate by Massey University. She was appointed an Officer of the New Zealand Order of Merit in the 2007 Queen's Birthday Honours, for services to the arts.
