= Paul Moughan =

Scientist at Massey University

Paul Moughan CNZM
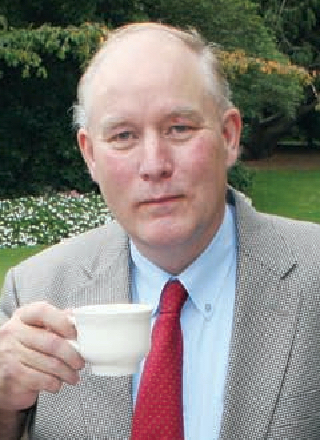
- Moughan in 2008
- Born: Hawke's Bay, New Zealand
- Education: Massey University
- Scientific career
- Fields: Nutrition and food science, digestive physiology, intermediary metabolism
- Workplaces: Massey University
- Thesis: Protein Metabolism in Simple-Stomached Mammals, D.Sc thesis, Massey University. (1996)
- Website: www.riddet.ac.nz/people/dist-prof-paul-j-moughan

Paul James Moughan CNZM is a New Zealand scientist specialising in mammalian protein metabolism and its application to human nutrition and health.

== Scientific career ==
Moughan completed his PhD at Massey University in 1984. He was subsequently appointed as an academic in 1985 at Massey University, with his research focussing on digestive physiology and intermediary metabolism. In 1995, he was awarded Massey University's highest qualification, Doctor of Science (DSc), based on his published works. He was also honoured with the Silver Medal of Honour from Wageningen University

In 1990, Moughan established Massey University's Monogastric Research Centre. He was appointed as Foundation Professor in Monogastric Biology at Massey University, in 1993 and a Personal Chair in 1996. When the University restructured, he formed a new multi-disciplinary Institute of Food, Nutrition and Human Health that spanned the three Massey University campuses. He was the foundation director of the Riddet Institute from 2003 to 2017, a centre of research excellence (CoRE). In 2005, he was appointed Distinguished Professor at Massey University. In 2018, he was appointed as Riddet Institute Fellow Laureate

Moughan has made contributions in the fields of digestive physiology, nutrient metabolism, the development of nutrient bio-availability assays, and food chemistry. His work has found wide application in human and animal nutrition, food science and in matters relevant to global food security and sustainable food production

== Honours and distinctions ==
- New Zealand University (UGC) Scholarship
- BioKyowa Award USA 1993 for “outstanding contributions to amino acid technology.”
- Honorary Research Fellow, New Zealand Dairy Research Institute, 1995
- Fellow of the Royal Society of New Zealand, 1997
- Muriel Bell Lectureship of the New Zealand Nutrition Society, 1997
- All Tech Medal of Excellence, USA 2001
- Massey University Medal for leading research team
- Honorary fellow, Centre for Nutritional Modelling, University of Guelph, Canada, 2006
- JM Bell Distinguished Lecture, University of Saskatchewan, Canada 2008
- Massey University Research Medal, 2011
- Fellow of the Royal Society of Chemistry, Cambridge England 2011
- NZ Prime Minister's Science Prize, 2012
- Honorary Doctor of Science, University of Guelph, Canada, 2014
- Wageningen University, Supreme Silver Medal of Honour, 2019
- Fellow of the New Zealand Institute of Food Science and Technology 2020

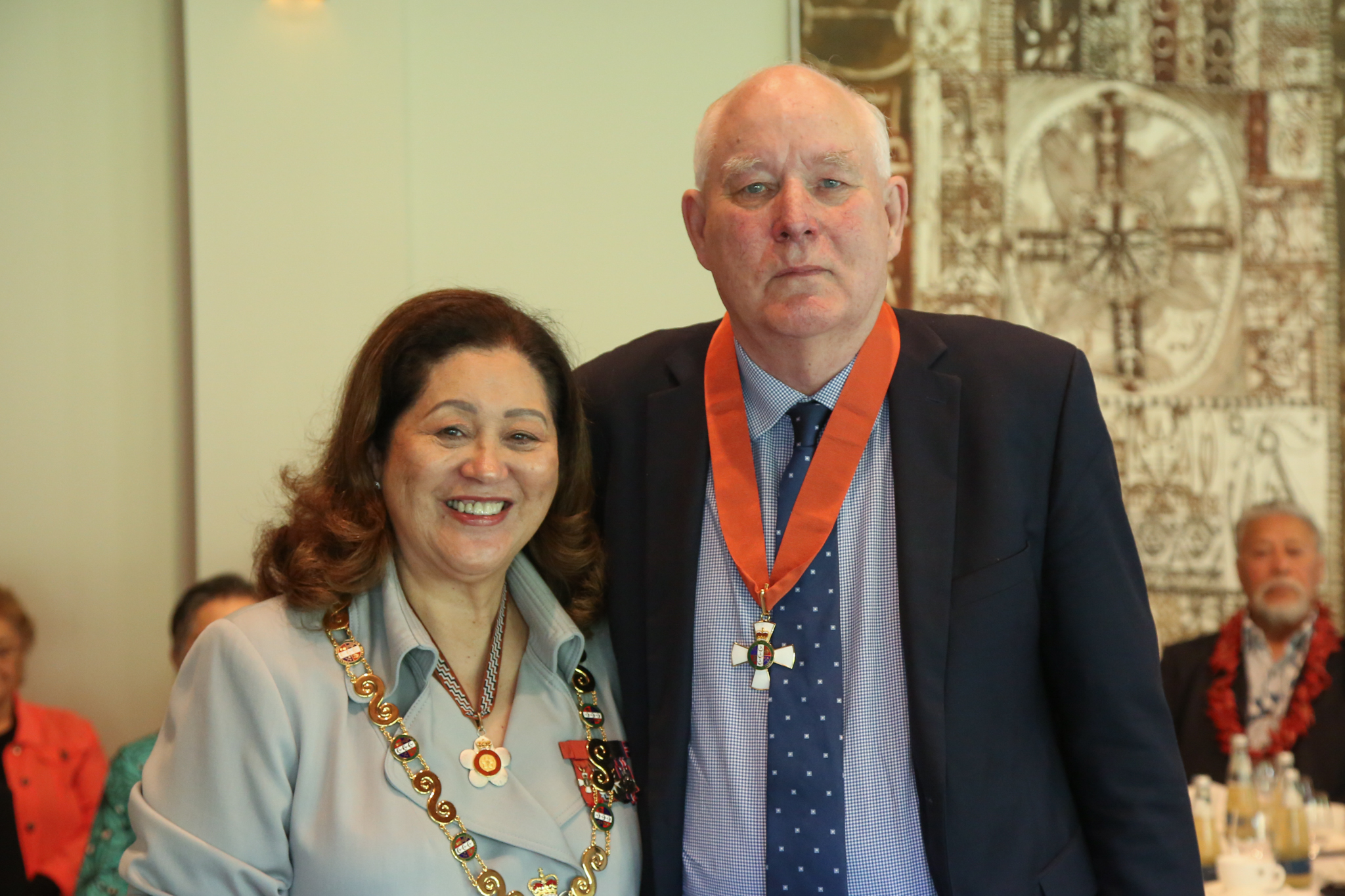
Moughan (right), after his investiture as a Companion of the New Zealand Order of Merit by the governor-general, Dame Cindy Kiro, at Government House, Auckland, on 16 April 2026

In the 2026 New Year Honours, Moughan was appointed a Companion of the New Zealand Order of Merit, for services to science.
