= C. Wayne McIlwraith =

New Zealand and American veterinarian (born 1947)

C. Wayne McIlwraith ONZM
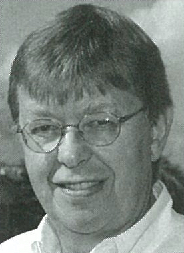
- Born: 12 December 1947 (age 78); Oamaru, New Zealand
- Education: Massey University; Purdue University
- Known for: Pioneering arthroscopic surgery in the horse, elucidation of pathogenesis of equine traumatic arthritis and osteoarthritis including early diagnosis with fluid and imaging biomarkers, validating the value of conventional therapies of joint disease as well as new biologic therapies (including stem cells) in equine joint disease.
- Awards: Marshall R. Urist, MD (2014); Jacob Markowitz (2013); Founders Award (2006)
- Scientific career
- Fields: Equine orthopaedics Translational musculoskeletal research Veterinary medicine
- Workplaces: Colorado State University
- Website: csuequineortho.com

Cyril Wayne McIlwraith ONZM (born 12 December 1947) is the founding director of the Orthopaedic Research Center, a University Distinguished Professor in orthopaedics and holds the Barbara Cox Anthony University Chair in Orthopaedic Research at Colorado State University. He is a New Zealander who has had most of his career in the United States and is an equine orthopaedic surgeon and orthopaedic researcher. He pioneered many of the techniques in equine arthroscopic surgery including writing the textbook “Diagnostic and surgical arthroscopy in the horse” (four editions). He is noted for significant achievements in the fields of osteoarthritis cartilage injury, regenerative therapies and contributions on understanding of joint pathology and repair, the development and validation of equine models of joint diseases, surgical technologies, intra-articular therapies, cartilage resurfacing, tissue engineering and gene therapies for osteoarthritis many of which have been or are translatable to human joint disease. He received the Marshall R. Urist Award for Excellence in Tissue Regeneration Research from the Orthopaedic Research Society in 2014 for these contributions as well as raising many generations of basic and clinical researchers in the field of orthopaedics. In 2025 McIlwraith was appointed an Officer of the New Zealand Order of Merit for services to veterinary medicine and the equine industry.

== Early life and education ==
McIlwraith was born and raised in Oamaru, New Zealand where he attended Waitaki Boys' High School. He then received undergraduate education at Otago University and then his veterinary degree at Massey University in New Zealand (BVSc/DVM). After three years in private practice in New Zealand and the United Kingdom he did a large animal surgery internship at University of Guelph, Canada followed by large animal surgical residency at Purdue University. He completed his PhD in equine arthritis from Purdue University in 1979. He was board certified as a Diplomate of the American College of Veterinary Surgeons in 1979 and board certified as a Diplomate of the American College of Sports Medicine and Rehabilitation in 2010. He is also a Diplomate of the European College of Veterinary Surgeons and is a fellow of the Royal College of Veterinary Surgeons (London).

== Career and impact ==
McIlwraith began work as an assistant professor of surgery in 1979 at Colorado State University with appointments as an equine surgeon in the Veterinary Teaching Hospital as well as researcher and teacher in the Department of Clinical Sciences. Having started doing diagnostic arthroscopy as a resident and graduate student at Purdue he developed techniques of arthroscopic surgery in the early years at Colorado State University including the first descriptions of arthroscopic surgery for osteochondral fragmentation in the carpus and metacarpophalangeal joints, for OCD of the metacarpophalangeal, tarsocrural, femorotibial articulations as well as shoulder. He wrote the first edition of the arthroscopic surgery book in 1984. He developed a referral surgical practice in Orange County, California as well as doing selected arthroscopic surgeries nationally and internationally.

In 1994 he became Director of Equine Sciences at Colorado State University and founded the Orthopaedic Research Laboratory which later became the Orthopaedic Research Center and now is a large, multifaceted program addressing the critical problems both in joint disease in both the horse and more recently translational research to humans. He has focused on his position of Director of the Orthopaedic Research Center from 2000 until 2016. McIlwraith became a university distinguished professor in 2009 and has also been the director of the Musculoskeletal Research Program (which has been a program of research and scholarly excellence at Colorado State University) since 2003. To further the recent escalation of the program in research translatable to humans a 130,000-square-foot building is currently under construction and is to be named the C. Wayne McIlwraith Translational Medicine Institute.

== Awards and honors ==
McIlwraith has been awarded the Tierklinik Hochmoor Prize from Equitana, Germany in 1993 for international contributions to equine orthopaedics, the degree of Dr med vet (honoris causa) from the University of Vienna in 1995 for pioneering arthroscopic surgery in the horse, the Schering-Plough Award for Equine Applied Research from the World Equine Veterinary Association in 1995 for outstanding research work performed over the last five years with respect to equine locomotor disorders, the John Hickman Award for Equine Orthopaedics from the British Equine Veterinary Association and Equine Veterinary Journal for leading work in arthroscopic surgery and equine joint disease research, a Doctor of Science (honoris causa) from Purdue University in 2001, the Barbara Cox Anthony University Endowed Chair in Orthopaedic Research at Colorado State University in 2002, Doctor of Science (honoris causa) in 2003 from Massey University, New Zealand and Laurea Dr. (honoris causa) in 2004 from the University of Turin, Italy. He was inducted into the International Equine Research Hall of Fame, in 2005, was the Frank Milne Lecturer at the American Association of Equine Practitioners in 2005, the Wade O. Brinker Lecturer at Michigan State University in 2006, John Hickman Memorial Lecturer at the British Equine Veterinary Association in 2006 and received the Founders Award for Lifetime Achievement by the American College of Veterinary Surgeons in 2006 (the second person to receive the award). He was made a University Distinguished Professor at Colorado State University in 2009 and received a Dr. vet med (honoris causa) degree from the Royal Veterinary College, University of London, England in 2010 and was made a Distinguished Life Member of the American Association of Equine Practitioners in 2009 and a Life Member of the New Zealand Equine Veterinary Association in 2011.

He received the Markowitz Award from the Academy of Surgical Research for Outstanding Contributions to Medicine through the Arts, Science and Technology of Experimental Surgery in 2013 and the Marshall R. Urist, MD Award for Excellence in Tissue Regeneration Research from the Orthopaedic Research Society in 2014.

In the 2025 New Year Honours McIlwraith was appointed an Officer of the New Zealand Order of Merit for services to veterinary medicine and the equine industry.

== Other activities ==
McIlwraith is a Past President of the American College of Veterinary Surgeons, the and the Veterinary Orthopaedic Society. In addition to his duties leading at Colorado State University he maintains an outside referral and consulting practice in equine orthopaedic surgery in California as well as elsewhere nationally and internationally. He has authored or co-authored five textbooks (all in multiple editions) as well as 470 scientific publications. He also holds honorary doctorates by the Massey University, University of Turin and Royal Veterinary College.
