= Kim Workman =

New Zealand criminal justice advocate

Sir Kim Workman KNZM QSO
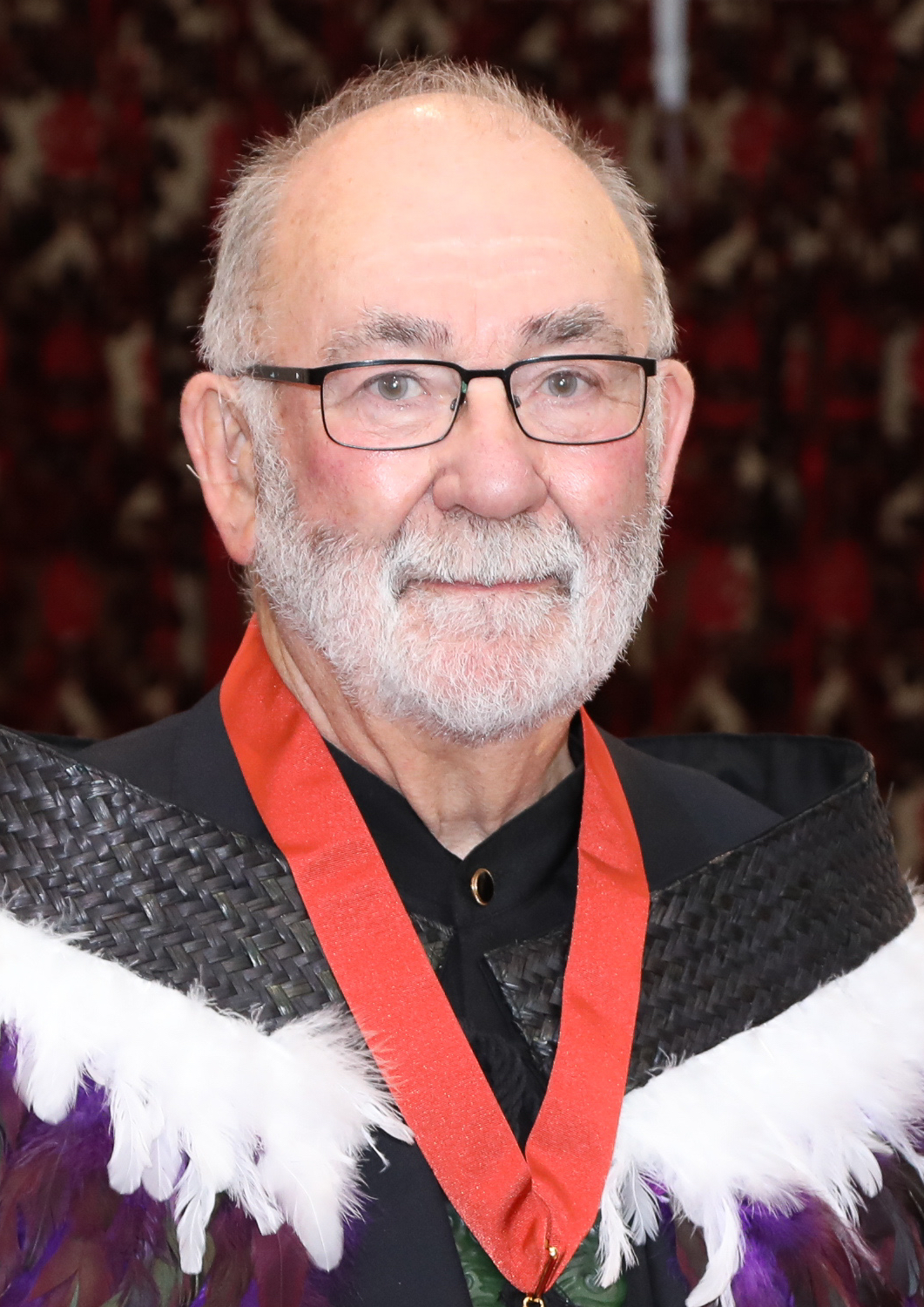
- Workman in 2019

Personal details
- Born: Robert Kinsela Workman; 1940 or 1941 (age 85–86)

Sir Robert Kinsela Workman KNZM QSO (born 1940 or 1941), commonly known as Kim Workman, is a New Zealand criminal justice advocate.

== Career ==
Following the Dawn Raids, Workman resigned as a senior sergeant in Lower Hutt police force over his opposition to the racism displayed in the police response.

He served as Families Commissioner between 2008 and 2011, having previously been the national director of Prison Fellowship New Zealand. Workman has been a long-time advocate of prisoners' rights and for reform in the criminal justice system: he founded the Robson Hanan Trust, which is responsible for the Rethinking Crime and Punishment strategy, and was also the founder of JustSpeak, a youth network seeking changes in the criminal justice system, in 2011. From 2012 to 2013, he was a member of board of the Prisoners Aid and Rehabilitation Trust, and in 2013 he was appointed as an adjunct research fellow at Victoria University of Wellington's Institute of Criminology.

In March 2021, he was appointed chair of an independent research panel investigating unconscious bias in New Zealand Police.

== Honours ==
In the 2007 Queen's Birthday Honours, Workman was named a Companion of the Queen's Service Order, for services to prisoner welfare. In the 2019 New Year Honours, Workman was appointed a Knight Companion of the New Zealand Order of Merit, for services to prisoner welfare and the justice sector.

Workman has been conferred honorary Doctor of Literature degrees by both Victoria University of Wellington (2016) and Massey University (2017). He was named Senior New Zealander of the Year at the 2018 New Zealander of the Year Awards.

== Personal life ==
Of Māori descent, Workman affiliates to Ngāti Kahungunu ki Wairarapa.
